= 2020–21 Northeast Conference men's basketball season =

- League: NCAA Division I
- Sport: Basketball
- Number of teams: 10
- TV partner(s): NEC Front Row, ESPN2, MSG, FCS, Regional Sports Networks

NBA Draft

Regular season
- First place: Wagner
- Runners-up: Bryant
- Season MVP: Alex Morales (Wagner)

NEC tournament
- Champions: Mount St. Mary's
- Runners-up: Bryant
- Finals MVP: Nana Opoku (Mount St. Mary's)

Northeast Conference men's basketball seasons
- ← 2019–20 2021–22 →

2020–21 Northeast Conference men's basketball standings
	Conf.				Overall
Team	W		L	PCT	W		L	PCT
Wagner	13	–	5	.722	13	–	7	.650
Bryant	10	–	4	.714	15	–	7	.682
Sacred Heart	9	–	7	.563	9	–	9	.500
Mount St. Mary's †	9	–	7	.563	12	–	11	.522
Merrimack*	9	–	9	.500	9	–	9	.500
LIU	9	–	9	.500	9	–	9	.500
St. Francis Brooklyn	9	–	9	.500	9	–	10	.474
Fairleigh Dickinson	8	–	10	.444	9	–	15	.375
Saint Francis (PA)	5	–	13	.278	6	–	16	.273
Central Connecticut	5	–	13	.278	5	–	16	.238
* ineligible for the 2021 NCAA tournament due to transition period
† 2021 NEC tournament winner

The 2020–21 Northeast Conference men's basketball season began with practices in October 2020, followed by the start of the 2020–21 NCAA Division I men's basketball season in November. Conference play started in January and ended in March 2021.

The NEC tournament was held in March with the higher-seeded team hosting each game.

== Changes from last season ==
Robert Morris left the conference and joined the Horizon League.

== Head coaches ==
Team	Head coach	Previous position	Year at school	Overall record	NEC record	NEC tournament championships
Bryant	Jared Grasso	Iona (asst.)	3	25–37	14–22	0
Central Connecticut	Donyell Marshall	Buffalo (asst.)	5	35–78	19–53	0
Fairleigh Dickinson	Greg Herenda	UMass Lowell	8	92–127	59–65	2
LIU	Derek Kellogg	UMass	4	49–51	28–26	1
Merrimack	Joe Gallo	Robert Morris (asst.)	5	81–45	14–4	0
Mount St. Mary's	Dan Engelstad	Southern Vermont	3	20–43	13–23	0
Sacred Heart	Anthony Latina	Sacred Heart (asst.)	8	90–131	58–66	0
St. Francis Brooklyn	Glenn Braica	St. John's (asst.)	11	145–170	93–85	0
Saint Francis (PA)	Rob Krimmel	Saint Francis (asst.)	9	119–133	78–64	0
Wagner	Bashir Mason	Wagner (asst.)	9	131–117	83–59	0

Notes:

- All records, appearances, titles, etc. are from time with current school only.
- Year at school includes 2020–21 season.
- Overall and NEC/NCAA records are from time at current school and are before the beginning of the 2020–21 season. Because the current LIU athletic program inherited the athletic history of LIU Brooklyn, Kellogg's record includes his two seasons at LIU Brooklyn before the LIU athletic merger.
- Previous jobs are head coaching jobs unless otherwise noted.

== Preseason ==
=== Preseason coaches poll ===
Rank	Team
1.	Fairleigh Dickinson (6)
2.	LIU (4)
3.	Bryant (tie)
4.	Mount St. Mary's (tie)
5.	St. Francis Brooklyn
6.	St. Francis (PA)
7.	Merrimack
8.	Wagner
9.	Central Connecticut
10.	Sacred Heart

() first place votes

=== Preseason All-NEC team ===
Recipient	School
Damian Chong Qui, (Junior, Guard)	Mount St. Mary's
Ty Flowers (RS-Senior, Forward)	LIU
Chauncey Hawkins (Senior, Guard)	St. Francis Brooklyn
Jahlil Jenkins, (Senior, Guard)	Fairleigh Dickinson
Elyjah Williams, (Senior, Forward)	Fairleigh Dickinson

== NEC regular season ==
=== Player of the week ===
Throughout the regular season, the Northeast Conference offices named player(s) of the week and rookie(s) of the week.

Week	Player of the week	Rookie of the week
November 30, 2020	Mark Flagg, St. Francis (PA)	Pier-Olivier Racine, FDU; Maxwell Land, St. Francis (PA)
December 7, 2020	Peter Kiss, Bryant	Joe Munden Jr., FDU
December 14, 2020	Travis Atson, St. Francis Brooklyn Elyjah Williams, FDU	Joe Munden Jr., FDU
December 23, 2020	Michael Green III, Bryant	Mike Sixsmith, Sacred Heart
January 11, 2021	Peter Kiss (2), Bryant; Tyler Thomas, Sacred Heart	Matas Spokas, Sacred Heart
January 18, 2021	Alex Morales, Wagner; Damian Chong Qui, MSMU	Josh Reaves, MSMU
January 25, 2021	Jordan Minor, Merrimack; Damian Chong Qui (2), MSMU	Maxwell Land (2), St. Francis (PA)
February 2, 2021	Eral Penn, LIU; Jahlil Jenkins, FDU	Bryce Johnson, Sacred Heart
February 8, 2021	Alex Morales (2), Wagner	DeLonnie Hunt, Wagner
February 15, 2021	Alex Morales (3), Wagner; Damian Chong Qui (3), MSMU	DeLonnie Hunt (2), Wagner
February 23, 2021	Ty Flowers, LIU	DeLonnie Hunt (3), Wagner
March 1, 2021	Alex Morales (4), Wagner	Mike Sixsmith (2), Sacred Heart

School	Player of the week Awards	Rookie of the week Awards
Bryant	3	0
Central Connecticut	0	0
Fairleigh Dickinson	2	3
LIU	2	0
Merrimack	1	0
Mount St. Mary's	3	0
Sacred Heart	0	4
St. Francis Brooklyn	1	0
Saint Francis (PA)	1	2
Wagner	4	3

=== Against other conferences ===
**Regular Season**

NEC vs Power Conferences	Record
ACC	1–2
Big East	0–4
Big Ten	0–4
Big 12	0–0
SEC	0–0
NEC vs Power Conferences Total	1–10
Other NCAA Division I Conferences	Record
America East	2–3
AAC	0–0
A-Sun	0–1
Atlantic-10	1–1
Big South	0-0
Big West	0–0
CAA	0–2
C-USA	0–0
Horizon League	0–0
Ivy League	0–0
MAAC	0–2
Mid-American	0–0
MEAC	1–0
OVC	0–0
Patriot League	0–2
SoCon	0–0
Southland	0–0
SWAC	0–0
The Summit	0–0
Sun Belt	0–0
WAC	0–0
WCC	0–0
Other Division I Total	4–11
NCAA Division I Total	5–21
As of December 29, 2019; In bold are the Power Five conferences.

**Postseason**

NEC vs Power Conferences	Record
ACC	0–0
Big East	0–0
Big Ten	0–0
Big 12	0–0
SEC	0–0
NEC vs Power Conferences Total	0–0
Other NCAA Division I Conferences	Record
America East	0–0
AAC	0–0
A-Sun	0–0
Atlantic-10	0–0
Big South	0-0
Big West	0–0
CAA	0–0
C-USA	0–0
Horizon League	0–0
Ivy League	0–0
MAAC	0–0
Mid-American	0–0
MEAC	0-0
OVC	0–0
Patriot League	0–0
SoCon	0–0
Southland	0–0
SWAC	0–1
The Summit	0–0
Sun Belt	0–0
WAC	0–0
WCC	0–0
Other Division I Total	0–1
NCAA Division I Total	0–1

=== Conference matrix ===
This table summarizes the head-to-head results between teams in conference play.

	Bryant	CCSU	FDU	LIU	Merrimack	MSMU	Sacred Heart	SFB	SFU	Wagner
vs. Bryant	–	0–2	2–0	0–2	0–2	0–0	0–0	1–1	1–1	0–2
vs. Central Conn.	2–0	–	1–1	2–0	2–0	1–1	2–0	1–1	1–1	1–1
vs. Fairleigh Dickinson	0–2	1–1	–	0–2	2–0	1–1	1–1	2–0	1–1	2–0
vs. LIU	2–0	0–2	2–0	–	1–1	2–0	1–1	0–2	0–2	1–1
vs. Merrimack	2–0	0–2	0–2	1–1	–	2–0	1–1	1–1	0–2	2–0
vs. Mount St. Mary's	0–0	1–1	1–1	0–2	0–2	–	1–1	2–0	0–2	2–0
vs. Sacred Heart	0–0	0–2	1–1	1–1	1–1	1–1	–	1–1	1–1	1–1
vs. St. Francis Brooklyn	1–1	1–1	0–2	2–0	1–1	0–2	1–1	–	1–1	2–0
vs. Saint Francis (PA)	1–1	1–1	1–1	2–0	2–0	2–0	1–1	1–1	–	2–0
vs. Wagner	2–0	1–1	0–2	1–1	0–2	0–2	1–1	0–2	0–2	–
Total	10–4	5–13	8–10	9–9	9–9	9–7	9–7	9–9	5–13	13–5

=== All-NEC honors and awards ===
At the conclusion of the regular season, the conference selects outstanding performers based on a poll of league coaches, below are the results.

Honor	Recipient
Player of the Year	Alex Morales, Wagner
Coach of the Year	Bashir Mason, Wanger
Defensive Player of the Year	Nana Opoku, Mount St. Mary's
Rookie of the Year	DeLonnie Hunt, Wanger
Most Improved Player of the Year	Tyler Thomas, Sacred Heart
All-NEC First Team	Damian Chong Qui, Mount St. Mary’s
All-NEC First Team	Elijah Ford, Wagner
All-NEC First Team	Peter Kiss, Bryant
All-NEC First Team	Alex Morales, Wagner
All-NEC First Team	Eral Penn, LIU
All-NEC Second Team	Ty Flowers, LIU
All-NEC Second Team	Michael Green III, Bryant
All-NEC Second Team	Chauncey Hawkins, St. Francis Brooklyn
All-NEC Second Team	Jahlil Jenkins, Fairleigh Dickinson
All-NEC Second Team	Tyler Thomas, Sacred Heart
All-NEC Third Team	Travis Atson, St. Francis Brooklyn
All-NEC Third Team	Ramiir Dixon-Conover , Saint Francis (PA)
All-NEC Third Team	Jordan Minor, Merrimack
All-NEC Third Team	Mikey Watkins, Merrimack
All-NEC Third Team	Elyjah Williams, Fairleigh Dickinson
All-NEC Rookie Team	Malik Edmead, Merrimack
All-NEC Rookie Team	DeLonnie Hunt, Wagner
All-NEC Rookie Team	Maxwell Land, Saint Francis (PA)
All-NEC Rookie Team	Joe Munden Jr., Faireigh Dickinson
All-NEC Rookie Team	Mike Sixsmith, Sacred Heart

== Postseason ==
=== NEC tournament ===
Due to complications caused by the COVID-19 pandemic, only the top four teams in the Northeast Conference were eligible to compete in the 2021 NEC tournament. Teams were seeded by record within the conference, with a tiebreaker system to seed teams with identical conference records.

Semifinals; Saturday, March 6, 2021; ESPN3
1	Wagner	60
4	Mount St. Mary's	66
2	Bryant	85
3	Sacred Heart	55

Championship; Tuesday, March 9, 2021; ESPN2
4	Mount St. Mary's	73
2	Bryant	68

=== NCAA tournament ===
Seed	Region	School	First Four
#16	East	Mount St. Mary's	vs Texas Southern, L 52-60

== See also ==
- 2020–21 Northeast Conference women's basketball season
