= Bryant Bulldogs men's basketball =

University team in Rhode Island

2026–27 Bryant Bulldogs men's basketball team
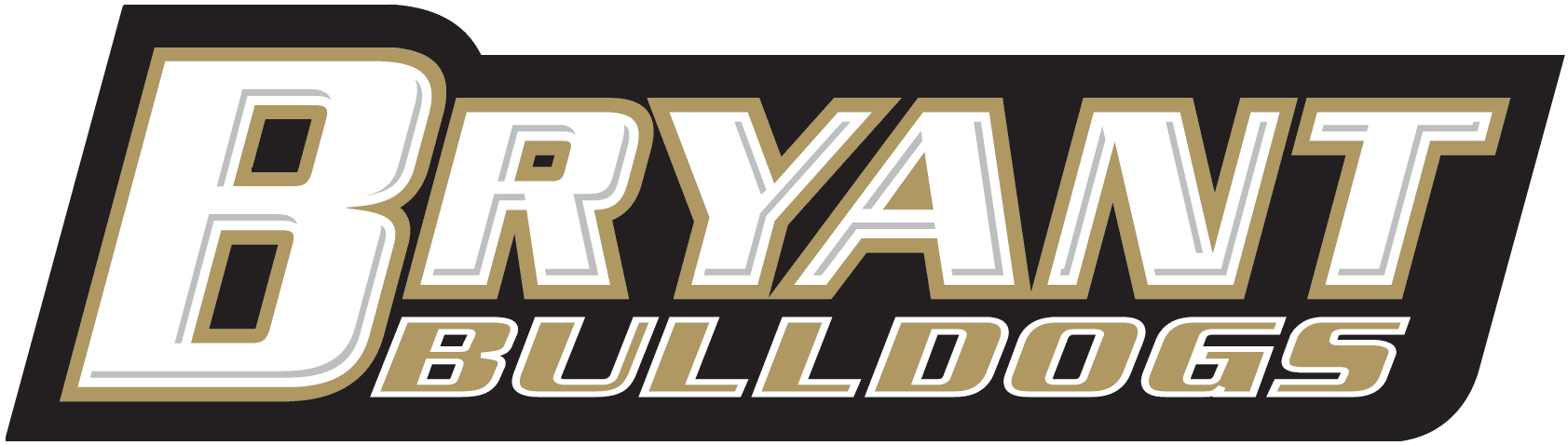
- University: Bryant University
- First season: 1963–64; 63 years ago
- Head coach: Jamion Christian (2nd season)
- Location: Smithfield, Rhode Island
- Arena: Chace Athletic Center (capacity: 2,000)
- Conference: America East
- Nickname: Bulldogs
- Colors: Black and gold
- All-time record: 849–925 (.479)

NCAA Division I tournament runner-up
- 2005*
Other NCAA Division I tournament results
Final Four	2005*
Elite Eight	2005*
Sweet Sixteen	2004*, 2005*, 2007*
Appearances	1978*, 1980*, 2004*, 2005*, 2006*, 2007*, 2008*, 2022, 2025

Conference tournament champions
- Northeast-10 Conference: 1980, 1997, 2004, 2005 Northeast Conference: 2022 America East Conference: 2025

Conference regular-season champions
- Northeast-10 Conference: 1996, 2004 Northeast Conference: 2022 America East Conference: 2025

Uniforms
Home	Away
- * at Division II level

The Bryant Bulldogs men's basketball team represents Bryant University in NCAA Division I men's basketball. The team currently competes in the America East Conference. They are led by head coach Jamion Christian and play their home games at the Chace Athletic Center. The Bulldogs have appeared twice in the NCAA Division I men's basketball tournament, most recently in 2025.

== History ==
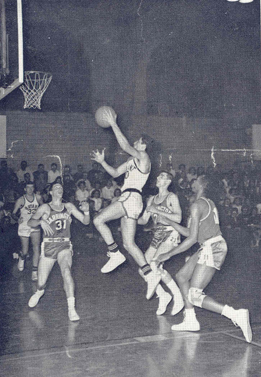
Bryant vs. Salem State in 1966

Bryant vs. Syracuse in 2006

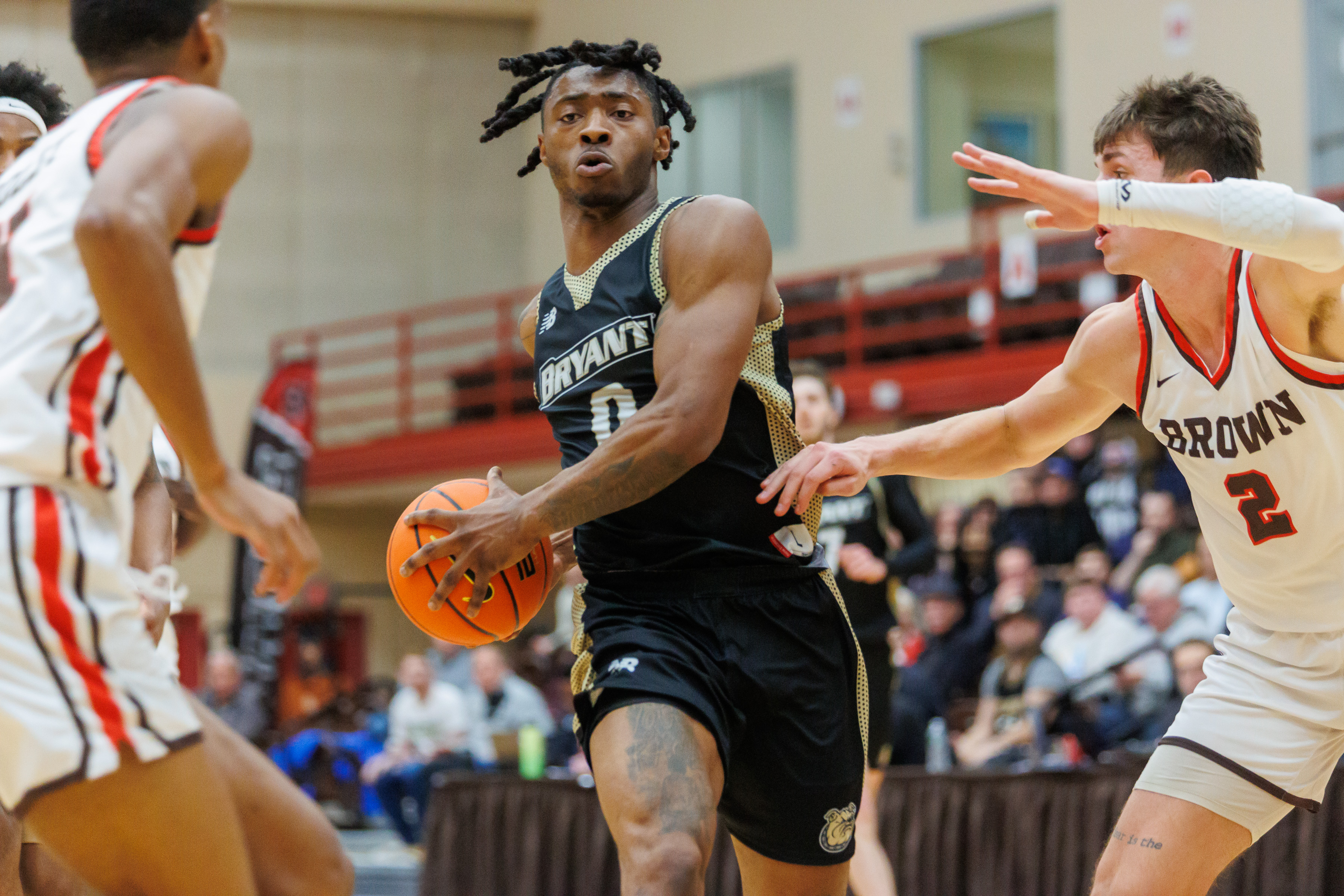
Bryant vs. Brown in 2023. Pictured: Earl Timberlake

Bryant University competed in the NAIA as an NAIA independent program from 1963 until 1976 as the Bryant College Indians before the college became a member of the NCAA Division II level in 1977. Bryant's most successful season during the college's tenure in the NAIA came in the 1966–67 season when the team recorded an undefeated regular season, going 22–0 before losing the final two games of the 1966–67 season in the District 32 Tournament. The 22–2 overall record was the team's best during the NAIA years. The 22 wins set a team high win streak that still stands as a school record as of 2012. And the 22 total wins was not eclipsed until the 2003–04 season.

Within a few seasons of transitioning to NCAA Division II, the college became a charter member of the Northeast-10 Conference in 1980.

In 2008, Bryant began the transition to Division I with former Ohio University coach Tim O'Shea. The 2012–13 season marked the first year Bryant was eligible for the postseason, in which they qualified for the 2013 College Basketball Invitational.

In 2015, Bryant University assistant basketball coach Chris Burns came out as gay, making him the first openly gay coach in Division I men's basketball.

O'Shea retired following the 2017–18 season and Jared Grasso was named head coach on April 2, 2018. Grasso orchestrated one of the nation's best turnarounds in his first season in Smithfield, improving the Bulldogs to a 10-win total after inheriting a squad that went 3–28 the prior season. Grasso was named a finalist for the Joe B. Hall Coach of the Year Award, given to the nation's top first-year head coach. The Bulldogs would continue to improve in 2019–20, rising to 15 victories including a win over Fordham in December. Grasso would then lead the Bulldogs to back-to-back Northeast Conference Championship games in 2020-21 and 2021–22, as well as winning the school's first ever NEC regular season championship in 2022. The 2022 NEC Championship game against Wagner resulted in not only Bryant winning their first ever NEC tournament championship, but they also clinched their first appearance in the NCAA Division I Tournament. This was Bryant's last season in the NEC, as the team moved to the America East Conference.

Bryant won the America East regular season title and America East Playoffs for the first time during the 2024-25 season, taking down Maine 77-59 in the final to clinch an NCAA Tournament berth.

=== Conference affiliations ===
- NAIA Independent – 1963–64 to 1975–76
- NCAA Division II Independent – 1976–77 to 1979–80
- Northeast-10 Conference – 1980–81 to 2007–08
- Northeast Conference – 2008–09 to 2021–22
- America East Conference – 2022–23 to Present

== Postseason ==
=== NCAA Division I Tournament results ===
Bryant has made two appearances in the NCAA Division I men's basketball tournament, with an overall record of 0–2.

Year	Seed	Round	Opponent	Result
2022	16	First Four	No. 16 Wright State	L 82–93
2025	No. 15	First Round	No. 2 Michigan State	L 62–87

=== NCAA Division II Tournament results ===
The Bulldogs have appeared in seven NCAA Division II Tournaments. Their combined record is 10–9.

Year	Round	Opponent	Result
1978	Regional semifinals Regional 3rd-place game	Merrimack; Bridgeport	L 91–116; L 85–89
1980	Regional semifinals Regional 3rd-place game	Springfield; Quinnipiac	L 78–91; L 97–102
2004	Regional Quarterfinals; Regional semifinals Regional Finals	C.W. Post; New York Tech; UMass Lowell	W 65–63; W 64–60; L 62–63
2005	Regional Quarterfinals; Regional semifinals Regional Finals; Elite Eight; Final Four; National Championship Game	Adelphi; Bloomfield; Bentley; Mount Olive; Tarleton State; Virginia Union	W 69–48; W 76–59; W 74–64; W 84–69; W 60–55; L 58–63
2006	Regional Quarterfinals	UMass Lowell	L 67–77
2007	Regional Quarterfinals; Regional semifinals Regional Finals	Adelphi; Saint Rose; Bentley	W 77–55; W 65–62; L 54–63
2008	Regional Quarterfinals; Regional semifinals	C.W. Post; Bentley	W 63–56; L 41–60

=== NAIA Tournament results ===
The Bulldogs have appeared in one NAIA Tournament. Their record is 0–1.

Year	Round	Opponent	Result
1975	First round	Winona State	L 72–93

=== CBI results ===
The Bulldogs have appeared twice in the College Basketball Invitational (CBI). Their record is 0–2.

Year	Round	Opponent	Result
2013	First round	Richmond	L 71–76
2021	First round	Coastal Carolina	L 82–93

== Season by Season Record ==
Season	Coach	Overall	Conference	Standing	Postseason
Earl Shannon (NAIA Independent) (1963–1964)
1963–64	Earl Shannon	12–11			
Earl Shannon:		12–11			
Tom Duffy (NAIA Independent) (1964–1968)
1964–65	Tom Duffy	16–6			
1965–66	Tom Duffy	17–7			
1966–67	Tom Duffy	21–2			NAIA District 32 Tournament
1967–68	Tom Duffy	15–7			
Tom Duffy:		69–22			
Tom Folliard (NAIA Independent) (1968–1977)
1968–69	Tom Folliard	21–5			
1969–70	Tom Folliard	19–7			
1970–71	Tom Folliard	11–14			
1971–72	Tom Folliard	13–10			
1972–73	Tom Folliard	20–6			
1973–74	Tom Folliard	20–8			
1974–75	Tom Folliard	21–8			
1975–76	Tom Folliard	16–11			
(NCAA Division II Independent) (1977–1978)
1976–77	Tom Folliard	13–13			
1977–78	Tom Folliard	20–6			NCAA Division II Regional
Tom Folliard:		174–88			
Leon Drury (NCAA Division II Independent) (1978–1980)
1978–79	Leon Drury	18–10			
1979–80	Leon Drury	20–7			NCAA Division II Regional
(Northeast-10 Conference) (1980–2008)
1980–81	Leon Drury	18–10	4–2		
1981–82	Leon Drury	14–12	5–7		
1982–83	Leon Drury	12–16	6–8		
1983–84	Leon Drury	6–21	2–12		
1984–85	Leon Drury	11–17	5–9		
1985–86	Leon Drury	11–21	4–10		
1986–87	Leon Drury	5–22	3–11		
1987–88	Leon Drury	6–24	3–15		
1988–89	Leon Drury	5–22	1–17		
Leon Drury:		126–182	33–91		
Ed Reilly (Northeast-10 Conference) (1989–2001)
1989–90	Ed Reilly	3–24	2–16		
1990–91	Ed Reilly	8–18	9–9		
1991–92	Ed Reilly	3–24	2–16		
1992–93	Ed Reilly	7–18	4–14		
1993–94	Ed Reilly	15–14	9–9		
1994–95	Ed Reilly	10–16	7–11		
1995–96	Ed Reilly	13–14	8–8		
1996–97	Ed Reilly	18–10	10–8		
1997–98	Ed Reilly	7–19	6–14		
1998–99	Ed Reilly	9–17	5–13		
1999–00	Ed Reilly	8–19	6–12		
2000–01	Ed Reilly	8–18	5–17		
Ed Reilly:		109–211	73–147		
Max Good (Northeast-10 Conference) (2001–2008)
2001–02	Max Good	7–19	4–18		
2002–03	Max Good	17–14	12–10		
2003–04	Max Good	23–10	14–8		NCAA Division II Third Round
2004–05	Max Good	25–9	15–7		NCAA Division II National Finalist
2005–06	Max Good	21–10	14–8		NCAA Division II First Round
2006–07	Max Good	21–11	14–8		NCAA Division II Third Round
2007–08	Max Good	18–13	12–10		NCAA Division II Second Round
Max Good:		132–86	95–69		
Tim O'Shea (Northeast Conference) (2008–2018)
2008–09	Tim O'Shea	8–21			
2009–10	Tim O'Shea	1–29	1–17	12th	
2010–11	Tim O'Shea	9–21	7–11	T–7th	
2011–12	Tim O'Shea	2–28	1–17	12th	
2012–13	Tim O'Shea	19–12	12–6	T–2nd	CBI First Round
2013–14	Tim O'Shea	18–14	10–6	3rd	
2014–15	Tim O'Shea	16–15	12–6	T–2nd	
2015–16	Tim O'Shea	8–23	5–13	9th	
2016–17	Tim O'Shea	12–20	9–9	T–5th	
2017–18	Tim O'Shea	3–28	2–16	10th	
Tim O'Shea:		96–211	59–101		
Jared Grasso (Northeast Conference) (2018–2022)
2018–19	Jared Grasso	10–20	7–11	8th	
2019–20	Jared Grasso	15–17	10–4	T–7th	
2020–21	Jared Grasso	15–7	10–4	2nd	CBI Quarterfinals
2021–22	Jared Grasso	22–10	15–2	1st	NCAA Tournament First Four
(America East Conference) (2022–present)
2022–23	Jared Grasso	17–13	8–8	T–4th	
Jared Grasso:		79–67	47–36		
Phil Martelli Jr. (America East Conference) (2023–2025)
2023–24	Phil Martelli Jr.	20–13	11–5	3rd	
2024–25	Phil Martelli Jr.	23–12	14–2	1st	NCAA Tournament Round of 64
Phil Martelli Jr.:		43–25	25–7		
Jamion Christian (America East Conference) (2025–present)
2025–26	Jamion Christian	9–22	5–11	T–7th	
Jamion Christian:		9–22	5–11		
Total:		849–925			
National champion Postseason invitational champion Conference regular season champion Conference regular season and conference tournament champion Division regular season champion Division regular season and conference tournament champion Conference tournament champion

- Note: From 2008 to 2012 Bryant was ineligible for NCAA post season play during transition to NCAA Division I.
