= 2020–21 LIU Sharks men's basketball team =

American college basketball season

2020–21 LIU Sharks men's basketball
- Conference: Northeast Conference
- Record: 9–9 (9–9 NEC)
- Head coach: Derek Kellogg (4th season)
- Assistant coaches: Jim Mack (6th season); Marlon Williamson (4th season); Ralph Auriantal (4th season)
- Home arena: Steinberg Wellness Center

2020–21 Northeast Conference men's basketball standings
	Conf.				Overall
Team	W		L	PCT	W		L	PCT
Wagner	13	–	5	.722	13	–	7	.650
Bryant	10	–	4	.714	15	–	7	.682
Sacred Heart	9	–	7	.563	9	–	9	.500
Mount St. Mary's †	9	–	7	.563	12	–	11	.522
Merrimack*	9	–	9	.500	9	–	9	.500
LIU	9	–	9	.500	9	–	9	.500
St. Francis Brooklyn	9	–	9	.500	9	–	10	.474
Fairleigh Dickinson	8	–	10	.444	9	–	15	.375
Saint Francis (PA)	5	–	13	.278	6	–	16	.273
Central Connecticut	5	–	13	.278	5	–	16	.238
† 2021 NEC tournament winner * ineligible for the 2021 NCAA tournament due to transition period

The 2020–21 LIU Sharks men's basketball team represented Long Island University during the 2020–21 NCAA Division I men's basketball season. The Sharks are led by fourth-year head coach Derek Kellogg, and play their home games at the Steinberg Wellness Center as members of the Northeast Conference (NEC).

== Previous season ==
The Sharks finished the 2019–20 season 15–18, 9–9 in NEC play to finish in a tie for fifth place. They defeated Fairleigh Dickinson in the quarterfinals of the NEC tournament before losing in the semifinals to Robert Morris.

== Roster ==
2020–21 LIU Sharks men's basketball team
Players
Coaches

Pos.	#	Name	Height	Weight	Year	Hometown
G	0	Virshon Cotton	6 ft 2 in (1.88 m)	165 lb (75 kg)	RS Jr	Milwaukee, Wisconsin
G	1	Jermaine Jackson Jr.	5 ft 10 in (1.78 m)	172 lb (78 kg)	Jr	Shelby Township, Michigan
G	3	Tre Wood	6 ft 1 in (1.85 m)	165 lb (75 kg)	RS So	Upper Marlboro, Maryland
F	3	Anthony Kabala	6 ft 8 in (2.03 m)	—	Fr	Paris, France
G/F	4	Kyndall Davis	6 ft 5 in (1.96 m)	—	Fr	Chicago, Illinois
G	5	Christian Jeanty	6 ft 3 in (1.91 m)	—	Fr	Brooklyn, New York
F	10	Jack Ballantyne	6 ft 9 in (2.06 m)	240 lb (109 kg)	Jr	Shelby Township, Michigan
F	11	Eral Penn	6 ft 7 in (2.01 m)	210 lb (95 kg)	RS Jr	Brooklyn, New York
F	12	Brandon Bridgewater	6 ft 0 in (1.83 m)	163 lb (74 kg)	So	Brooklyn, New York
G/F	13	Noble Crawford	6 ft 5 in (1.96 m)	—	RS Fr	Orlando, Florida
G	15	Devin Nicholson	6 ft 2 in (1.88 m)	180 lb (82 kg)	Jr	Staten Island, New York
F/C	20	Jake Cook	6 ft 9 in (2.06 m)	—	Fr	Watervliet, New York
G	21	James Hand V	5 ft 10 in (1.78 m)	—	Fr	Brooklyn, New York
G	23	Alex Rivera	6 ft 1 in (1.85 m)	185 lb (84 kg)	RS So	Lowell, Massachusetts
F	24	Ty Flowers	6 ft 9 in (2.06 m)	200 lb (91 kg)	RS Sr	Waterbury, Connecticut
G	32	Jonathan Durham	6 ft 3 in (1.91 m)	185 lb (84 kg)	Fr	Hasbrouck Heights, New Jersey
C	45	Ousmane Ndim	7 ft 0 in (2.13 m)	235 lb (107 kg)	Jr	Dakar, Senegal

Head coach

- Derek Kellogg (UMass)

Assistant coach(es)

- Jim Mack (Springfield)
- Marlon Williamson (Youngstown State)
- Ralph Auriantal (St. Francis Brooklyn)

Legend

- (C) Team captain
- (S) Suspended
- (I) Ineligible
- (W) Walk-on
- Injured
- Current redshirt

Roster
Last update: December 29, 2020

== Schedule and results ==
Date time, TV	Rank^{#}	Opponent^{#}	Result	Record	Site (attendance) city, state
Regular season
December 16, 2020; 4:00 pm		at Sacred Heart	W 75–55	1–0 (1–0)	William H. Pitt Center; Fairfield, CT
December 17, 2020; 4:00 pm		at Sacred Heart	L 72–87	1–1 (1–1)	William H. Pitt Center; Fairfield, CT
January 7, 2021; 7:00 pm		Saint Francis (PA)	W 78–75	2–1 (2–1)	Steinberg Wellness Center; Brooklyn, NY
January 8, 2021; 4:00 pm		Saint Francis (PA)	W 71–58	3–1 (3–1)	Steinberg Wellness Center; Brooklyn, NY
January 14, 2021; 7:00 pm		at Wagner	W 77–66	4–1 (4–1)	Spiro Sports Center; Staten Island, NY
January 15, 2021; 7:00 pm		at Wagner	L 74–76	4–2 (4–2)	Spiro Sports Center; Staten Island, NY
January 26, 2021; 7:00 pm		Merrimack	Postponed due to COVID-19		Steinberg Wellness Center; Brooklyn, NY
January 27, 2021; 4:00 pm		Merrimack	L 63–68	4–3 (4–3)	Steinberg Wellness Center; Brooklyn, NY
January 28, 2021; 1:00 pm		Merrimack	W 78–68	5–3 (5–3)	Steinberg Wellness Center; Brooklyn, NY
January 30, 2021; 4:00 pm, ESPN3		at St. Francis Brooklyn; Battle of Brooklyn	W 102–88	6–3 (6–3)	Generoso Pope Athletic Complex; Brooklyn, NY
February 1, 2021; 5:00 pm		St. Francis Brooklyn	Postponed due to snow		Steinberg Wellness Center; Brooklyn, NY
February 4, 2021; 7:00 pm		Fairleigh Dickinson	L 70–78	6–4 (6–4)	Steinberg Wellness Center; Brooklyn, NY
February 5, 2021; 5:00 pm		Fairleigh Dickinson	L 62–77	6–5 (6–5)	Steinberg Wellness Center; Brooklyn, NY
February 8, 2021; 5:00 pm		St. Francis Brooklyn	W 96–84	7–5 (7–5)	Steinberg Wellness Center; Brooklyn, NY
February 11, 2021; 7:00 pm		at Mount St. Mary's	L 60–66	7–6 (7–6)	Knott Arena; Emmitsburg, MD
February 12, 2021; 4:00 pm		at Mount St. Mary's	L 46–64	7–7 (7–7)	Knott Arena; Emmitsburg, MD
February 20, 2021; 7:00 pm		Central Connecticut	W 87–74	8–7 (8–7)	Steinberg Wellness Center; Brooklyn, NY
February 21, 2021; 4:00 pm		Central Connecticut	W 81–79	9–7 (9–7)	Steinberg Wellness Center; Brooklyn, NY
February 25, 2021; 7:00 pm		at Bryant	L 80–87	9–8 (9–8)	Chace Athletic Center; Smithfield, RI
February 26, 2021; 4:00 pm		at Bryant	L 60–63	9–9 (9–9)	Chace Athletic Center; Smithfield, RI
*Non-conference game. ^{#}Rankings from AP Poll. (#) Tournament seedings in parentheses. All times are in Eastern Time.
