= 2020–21 Sacred Heart Pioneers men's basketball team =

American college basketball season

2020–21 Sacred Heart Pioneers men's basketball
- Conference: Northeast Conference
- Record: 9–9 (9–7 NEC)
- Head coach: Anthony Latina (8th season)
- Assistant coaches: Johnny Kidd; Kevin Papacs; Kyle Steinway
- Home arena: William H. Pitt Center

2020–21 Northeast Conference men's basketball standings
	Conf.				Overall
Team	W		L	PCT	W		L	PCT
Wagner	13	–	5	.722	13	–	7	.650
Bryant	10	–	4	.714	15	–	7	.682
Sacred Heart	9	–	7	.563	9	–	9	.500
Mount St. Mary's †	9	–	7	.563	12	–	11	.522
Merrimack*	9	–	9	.500	9	–	9	.500
LIU	9	–	9	.500	9	–	9	.500
St. Francis Brooklyn	9	–	9	.500	9	–	10	.474
Fairleigh Dickinson	8	–	10	.444	9	–	15	.375
Saint Francis (PA)	5	–	13	.278	6	–	16	.273
Central Connecticut	5	–	13	.278	5	–	16	.238
† 2021 NEC tournament winner * ineligible for the 2021 NCAA tournament due to transition period

The 2020–21 Sacred Heart Pioneers men's basketball team represented Sacred Heart University during the 2020–21 NCAA Division I men's basketball season. This was the Pioneers' 22nd season of NCAA Division I basketball, all played in the Northeast Conference. The Pioneers are led by eighth-year head coach Anthony Latina and play their home games at the William H. Pitt Center in Fairfield, Connecticut.

== Previous season ==
The Pioneers finished the 2019–20 season 20–13, 12–6 in NEC play to finish in fourth place. They defeated Mount St. Mary's in the quarterfinals of the NEC tournament before losing in the semifinals to Saint Francis (PA). With 20 wins, they were a candidate for postseason play. However, all postseason tournaments were cancelled amid the COVID-19 pandemic.

== Roster ==
2020–21 Sacred Heart Pioneers men's basketball team
Players
Coaches

Pos.	#	Name	Height	Weight	Year	Hometown
G	0	Aaron Clarke	6 ft 1 in (1.85 m)	185 lb (84 kg)	Jr	Parsippany, New Jersey
F	1	Kasparas Jonauskas	6 ft 6 in (1.98 m)	187 lb (85 kg)	Fr	Kretinga, Lithuania
G	2	Kenneth Womack	5 ft 11 in (1.8 m)	186 lb (84 kg)	Fr	Upper Marlboro, Maryland
G	3	Mike Sixsmith	6 ft 0 in (1.83 m)	170 lb (77 kg)	Fr	Hicksville, New York
G	4	Alex Watson	6 ft 3 in (1.91 m)	170 lb (77 kg)	Sr	Marietta, Georgia
F	5	Zach Pfaffenberger	6 ft 8 in (2.03 m)	215 lb (98 kg)	Jr	Midlothian, Virginia
G	11	Quest Harris	5 ft 11 in (1.8 m)	185 lb (84 kg)	Fr	Lowell, Massachusetts
G	12	Zach Radz	6 ft 2 in (1.88 m)	203 lb (92 kg)	RS Sr	Watervliet, New York
F	21	Bryce Johnson	6 ft 6 in (1.98 m)	210 lb (95 kg)	Fr	Stockton, California
G	22	Tyler Thomas	6 ft 3 in (1.91 m)	195 lb (88 kg)	So	Amity, Connecticut
F	23	Matas Spokas	6 ft 7 in (2.01 m)	195 lb (88 kg)	Fr	Kaunas, Lithuania
G	24	Tommaso Ferraresi	6 ft 4 in (1.93 m)	190 lb (86 kg)	Fr	Venice, Italy
F	30	Cantavio Dutreil	6 ft 7 in (2.01 m)	210 lb (95 kg)	Jr	Gonaïves, Haiti
G	32	Abood Abuissa	6 ft 4 in (1.93 m)	210 lb (95 kg)	So	Doha, Qatar
F	45	Nico Galette	6 ft 6 in (1.98 m)	210 lb (95 kg)	Fr	Rahway, New Jersey

Head coach

- Anthony Latina (Brandeis)

Assistant coach(es)

- Johnny Kidd (Central Connecticut State)
- Kevin Papacs (Central Connecticut State)
- Kyle Steinway (Providence)

Legend

- (C) Team captain
- (S) Suspended
- (I) Ineligible
- (W) Walk-on
- Injured
- Current redshirt

Roster
Last update: December 28, 2020

== Schedule and results ==
Date time, TV	Rank^{#}	Opponent^{#}	Result	Record	Site (attendance) city, state
Regular season
November 25, 2020*; 7:00 pm, BTN+		at No. 24 Rutgers	L 63–86	0–1	The RAC; Piscataway, NJ
December 16, 2020; 4:00 pm		LIU	L 55–75	0–2 (0–1)	William H. Pitt Center; Fairfield, CT
December 17, 2020; 4:00 pm		LIU	W 87–72	1–2 (1–1)	William H. Pitt Center; Fairfield, CT
December 21, 2020; 7:00 pm, ESPN3		at Wagner	L 46–74	1–3 (1–2)	Spiro Sports Center; Staten Island, NY
December 22, 2020; 4:00 pm		at Wagner	W 86–85 ^{2OT}	2–3 (2–2)	Spiro Sports Center; Staten Island, NY
January 7, 2021; 4:00 pm		at Merrimack	L 90–97 ^{OT}	2–4 (2–3)	Hammel Court; North Andover, MA
January 8, 2021; 4:00 pm		at Merrimack	W 68–62	3–4 (3–3)	Hammel Court; North Andover, MA
January 14, 2021; 7:00 pm		Central Connecticut	W 65–48	4–4 (4–3)	William H. Pitt Center; Fairfield, CT
January 21, 2021; 7:00 pm		Saint Francis (PA)	L 58–76	4–5 (4–4)	William H. Pitt Center; Fairfield, CT
January 22, 2021; 4:00 pm		Saint Francis (PA)	W 82–70	5–5 (5–4)	William H. Pitt Center; Fairfield, CT
January 30, 2021; 2:00 pm		at Mount St. Mary's	W 61–58	6–5 (6–4)	Knott Arena; Emmitsburg, MD
January 31, 2021; 2:00 pm		at Mount St. Mary's	L 64–76	6–6 (6–5)	Knott Arena; Emmitsburg, MD
February 11, 2021; 7:00 pm		Bryant	Canceled		William H. Pitt Center; Fairfield, CT
February 12, 2021; 4:00 pm		Bryant	Canceled		William H. Pitt Center; Fairfield, CT
February 17, 2021; 7:00 pm		at Central Connecticut	W 82–70	7–6 (7–5)	William H. Detrick Gymnasium; New Britain, CT
February 20, 2021; 4:00 pm		at St. Francis Brooklyn	L 76–88	7–7 (7–6)	Generoso Pope Athletic Complex; Brooklyn, NY
February 21, 2021; 2:00 pm		at St. Francis Brooklyn	W 88–82	8–7 (8–6)	Generoso Pope Athletic Complex; Brooklyn, NY
February 25, 2021; 7:00 pm		Fairleigh Dickinson	L 69–82	8–8 (8–7)	William H. Pitt Center; Fairfield, CT
February 26, 2021; 7:00 pm		Fairleigh Dickinson	W 70–64	9–8 (9–7)	William H. Pitt Center; Fairfield, CT
NEC tournament
March 6, 2021; 12:00 pm, ESPN3	(3)	at (2) Bryant; Semifinals	L 55–85	9–9	Chace Athletic Center; Smithfield, RI
*Non-conference game. ^{#}Rankings from AP Poll. (#) Tournament seedings in parentheses. All times are in Eastern Time..
