= Jared Grasso =

American basketball coach (born 1980)

Current position
- Title: Assistant coach
- Team: Hampton
- Conference: CAA

Biographical details
- Born: May 11, 1980 (age 46); Syosset, New York, U.S.

Playing career
- 1998–2002: Quinnipiac

Coaching career (HC unless noted)
- 2002–2003: Hofstra (assistant)
- 2003–2005: Hartford (assistant)
- 2005–2006: Quinnipiac (assistant)
- 2006–2009: Fordham (assistant)
- 2009–2010: Fordham (interim HC)
- 2010–2011: Iona (assistant)
- 2011–2018: Iona (associate HC)
- 2018–2023: Bryant
- 2024–2026: The Knox School (NY)
- 2026–present: Hampton (assistant)

Head coaching record
- Overall: 80–89 (.473)
- Tournaments: 0–1 (NCAA Division I); 0–1 (CBI)

Accomplishments and honors

Championships
- NEC regular season (2022); NEC tournament (2022)

Awards
- NEC Coach of the Year (2022)

Jared Keith Grasso (born May 11, 1980) is an American basketball coach who currently is an assistant coach at Hampton University. He was most recently the head coach of Knox School, a private boarding and day school, after serving as head coach of the Bryant Bulldogs men's basketball team from 2018 to 2023.

== Playing career ==
Grasso was a four-year starter and two time captain at Quinnipiac, where he ranks sixth all-time in assists, sixth all-time in three-point field goals, and sixth all-time in minutes played. He graduated in 2002 as Quinnipiac's second 1,000-point scorer in its Division I era and was inducted into the university's Athletics Hall of Fame in 2014.

== Coaching career ==
After graduation, Grasso joined the coaching staff at Hofstra, where he was a graduate assistant for the 2002–03 season before moving on to Hartford for a two-year assistant coaching stint. He returned to his alma mater Quinnipiac for a season as an assistant coach before becoming an assistant coach under Dereck Whittenburg at Fordham.

When Whittenburg was fired on December 3, 2009, Grasso took over head coaching duties on an interim basis for the Rams for the remainder of the season. At 29 years old Grasso was then the youngest Division 1 coach in the country.

Grasso was not retained by Fordham after the 2010 season. He joined Tim Cluess's staff at Iona as the Associate Head Men's Basketball coach for the 2010–2011 season. During his 8 years at Iona the Gaels appeared in five NCAA tournaments, and 3 NITs. In addition, Iona won four MAAC conference tournament titles, along with four MAAC regular season titles.

On April 2, 2018, Grasso was named the 8th head coach in Bryant men's basketball history, and the second in the Division I era, replacing Tim O'Shea.

Grasso led the Bulldogs to one of the nation's biggest turnarounds. The Bulldogs were the only team in the nation to triple its win total. Grasso was recognized as a finalist for the Joe B. Hall Award as the nation's top first-year head coach.

In the 2020–21 season Grasso was named the USBWA District 1 Coach of the Year, while leading Bryant to its best record in the program's D1 history.

In the 2021–2022 season Grasso was named NEC Coach of the Year, while leading Bryant to its best season in program history, winning 22 games and winning the regular season and conference tournament titles.

On September 27, 2023, Bryant University placed Grasso on administrative leave for an undisclosed matter unrelated to subsequent events, which was publicly reported two days later. On October 1, Grasso was charged with a misdemeanor hit-and-run in North Smithfield, Rhode Island. The charge was dismissed on November 8 following a settlement through his insurance, though he remained on leave. Grasso officially resigned as head coach on November 13.

In April 2024, Grasso was named the head coach of varsity and postgraduate basketball at The Knox School, a private boarding and day school in St. James, New York.

In May 2026, Grasso joined Ivan Thomas's staff at Hampton as an assistant coach and recruiting coordinator.

== Head coaching record ==
Record table
Season	Team	Overall	Conference	Standing	Postseason
Fordham Rams (Atlantic 10 Conference) (2009–2010)
2009–10	Fordham*	1-22	0-14	T–14th	
Fordham:		1–22 (.043)	0–14 (.000)		
Bryant Bulldogs (Northeast Conference) (2018–2022)
2018–19	Bryant	10–20	7–11	8th	
2019–20	Bryant	15–17	7–11	T–7th	
2020–21	Bryant	15–7	10–4	2nd	CBI Quarterfinals
2021–22	Bryant	22–10	16–2	1st	NCAA Division I First Four
Bryant Bulldogs (America East Conference) (2022–2023)
2022–23	Bryant	17–13	8–8	T–4th	
Bryant:		79–67 (.541)	49–36 (.576)		
Total:		80–89 (.473)			
National champion Postseason invitational champion Conference regular season champion Conference regular season and conference tournament champion Division regular season champion Division regular season and conference tournament champion Conference tournament champion

*Denotes interim head coach
