= 2020–21 Merrimack Warriors men's basketball team =

American college basketball season

2020–21 Merrimack Warriors men's basketball
- Conference: Northeast Conference
- Record: 9–9 (9–9 NEC)
- Head coach: Joe Gallo (5th season)
- Assistant coaches: Micky Burtnyk (12th season); Phil Gaetano (3rd season)
- Home arena: Hammel Court

2020–21 Northeast Conference men's basketball standings
	Conf.				Overall
Team	W		L	PCT	W		L	PCT
Wagner	13	–	5	.722	13	–	7	.650
Bryant	10	–	4	.714	15	–	7	.682
Sacred Heart	9	–	7	.563	9	–	9	.500
Mount St. Mary's †	9	–	7	.563	12	–	11	.522
Merrimack*	9	–	9	.500	9	–	9	.500
LIU	9	–	9	.500	9	–	9	.500
St. Francis Brooklyn	9	–	9	.500	9	–	10	.474
Fairleigh Dickinson	8	–	10	.444	9	–	15	.375
Saint Francis (PA)	5	–	13	.278	6	–	16	.273
Central Connecticut	5	–	13	.278	5	–	16	.238
† 2021 NEC tournament winner * ineligible for the 2021 NCAA tournament due to transition period

The 2020–21 Merrimack Warriors men's basketball team represented Merrimack College in the 2020–21 NCAA Division I men's basketball season. The Warriors, led by fifth-year head coach Joe Gallo, played their home games at Hammel Court in North Andover, Massachusetts as second-year members of the Northeast Conference (NEC).

== Previous season ==
The Warriors finished the 2019–20 season 20–11, 14–4 in NEC play to finish as NEC regular season champions. In doing so, they became the first program in NCAA men's basketball history to win an outright conference regular season title in its first season of Division I reclassification. However, due to their transition from Division II to Division I, they were ineligible to participate in the NEC tournament, and are not eligible to do so until 2024. They were a candidate for an invitation to the 2020 CollegeInsider.com Postseason Tournament. However, the CIT, and all postseason tournaments, were cancelled amid the COVID-19 pandemic.

== Roster ==
2020–21 Merrimack Warriors men's basketball team
Players
Coaches

Pos.	#	Name	Height	Weight	Year	Previous school	Hometown
G	0	Malik Edmead	5 ft 10 in (1.78 m)	165 lb (75 kg)	Fr	Deer Park High School	Deer Park, New York
G	1	Khalief Crawford	6 ft 1 in (1.85 m)	195 lb (88 kg)	Sr	Linden High School	Linden, New Jersey
G	3	Mykel Derring	6 ft 2 in (1.88 m)	180 lb (82 kg)	So	Proctor Academy	Boston, Massachusetts
G	4	Ethan Helwig	6 ft 4 in (1.93 m)	205 lb (93 kg)	RS Fr	Metea Valley High School	Chicago, Illinois
G	5	Mikey Watkins	5 ft 11 in (1.8 m)	175 lb (79 kg)	Jr	Linden High School	Roselle, New Jersey
G	10	Jaylen Davis	6 ft 3 in (1.91 m)	195 lb (88 kg)	RS Fr	Benjamin N. Cardozo High School	Queens, New York
G	11	Ryan Miller	6 ft 2 in (1.88 m)	195 lb (88 kg)	Jr	IMG Academy	Weston, Massachusetts
G	13	James Berry III	6 ft 5 in (1.96 m)	175 lb (79 kg)	Fr	Bishop Ireton High School	Clinton, Maryland
G/F	14	Devin Jensen	6 ft 5 in (1.96 m)	220 lb (100 kg)	Sr	Manasquan High School	Brielle, New Jersey
F	15	Ryan Isaacson	6 ft 8 in (2.03 m)	200 lb (91 kg)	Fr	Hinsdale Central High School	Willowbrook, Illinois
F	22	Jordan Minor	6 ft 8 in (2.03 m)	240 lb (109 kg)	So	Brimmer and May School	Kingston, Massachusetts
G/F	23	Ziggy Reid	6 ft 6 in (1.98 m)	235 lb (107 kg)	So	St. Paul's School	Baltimore, Maryland
G	24	Jordan McKoy	6 ft 5 in (1.96 m)	180 lb (82 kg)	So	Dwight-Englewood School	Westwood, New Jersey
F	31	Justin Connolly	6 ft 7 in (2.01 m)	210 lb (95 kg)	Jr	Brooks School	Melrose, Massachusetts

Head coach

- Joe Gallo (Merrimack)

Assistant coach(es)

- Micky Burtnyk (Merrimack)
- Phil Gaetano (Sacred Heart)

Legend

- (C) Team captain
- (S) Suspended
- (I) Ineligible
- (W) Walk-on
- Injured
- Current redshirt

Roster
Last update: December 19, 2020

== Schedule and results ==
Date time, TV	Rank^{#}	Opponent^{#}	Result	Record	Site (attendance) city, state
Northeast Conference regular season
January 7, 2021; 7:00 pm		Sacred Heart	W 97–90 ^{OT}	1–0 (1–0)	Hammel Court (0); North Andover, MA
January 8, 2021; 4:00 pm		Sacred Heart	L 62–68	1–1 (1–1)	Hammel Court (0); North Andover, MA
January 14, 2021; 7:00 pm		at Mount St. Mary's	L 57–77	1–2 (1–2)	Knott Arena (0); Emmitsburg, MD
January 15, 2021; 4:00 pm		at Mount St. Mary's	L 52–63	1–3 (1–3)	Knott Arena (0); Emmitsburg, MD
January 21, 2021; 7:00 pm		Fairleigh Dickinson	W 62–51	2–3 (2–3)	Hammel Court (0); North Andover, MA
January 22, 2021; 4:00 pm		Fairleigh Dickinson	W 76–71	3–3 (3–3)	Hammel Court (0); North Andover, MA
January 27, 2021; 4:00 pm		at LIU	W 68–63	4–3 (4–3)	Steinberg Wellness Center (0); Brooklyn, NY
January 28, 2021; 1:00 pm		at LIU	L 68–78	4–4 (4–4)	Steinberg Wellness Center (0); Brooklyn, NY
January 30, 2021; 7:00 pm		at Wagner	Postponed due to COVID-19		Spiro Sports Center; Staten Island, NY
January 31, 2021; 4:00 pm		at Wagner	Postponed due to COVID-19		Spiro Sports Center; Staten Island, NY
February 4, 2021		Saint Francis (PA)	W 68–62	5–4 (5–4)	Hammel Court; North Andover, MA
February 5, 2021		Saint Francis (PA)	W 59–54	6–4 (6–4)	Hammel Court; North Andover, MA
February 11, 2021		at Central Connecticut	W 62–46	7–4 (7–4)	William H. Detrick Gymnasium; New Britain, CT
February 12, 2021		at Central Connecticut	W 72–52	8–4 (8–4)	William H. Detrick Gymnasium; New Britain, CT
February 20, 2021		at Bryant	L 58–60	8–5 (8–5)	Chace Athletic Center; Smithfield, RI
February 21, 2021		Bryant	L 60–76	8–6 (8–6)	Hammel Court; North Andover, MA
February 25, 2021		St. Francis Brooklyn	L 71–84	8–7 (8–7)	Hammel Court; North Andover, MA
February 26, 2021		St. Francis Brooklyn	W 75–67	9–7 (9–7)	Hammel Court; North Andover, MA
March 2, 2021; 7:00 pm		at Wagner	L 67–74	9–8 (9–8)	Spiro Sports Center; Staten Island, NY
March 3, 2021; 4:00 pm		at Wagner	L 59–64	9–9 (9–9)	Spiro Sports Center; Staten Island, NY
*Non-conference game. ^{#}Rankings from AP Poll. (#) Tournament seedings in parentheses. All times are in Eastern.
