= 2020–21 Central Connecticut Blue Devils men's basketball team =

American college basketball season

2020–21 Central Connecticut Blue Devils men's basketball
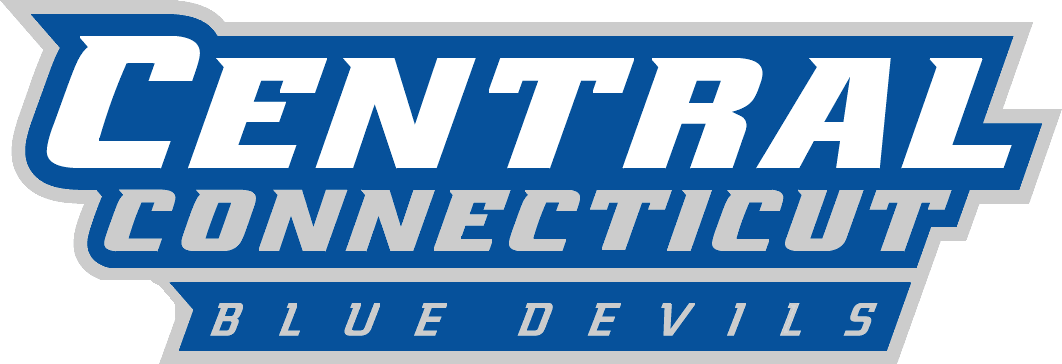
- Conference: Northeast Conference
- Record: 5–16 (5–13 NEC)
- Head coach: Donyell Marshall (5th season)
- Assistant coaches: Mike Witcoskie; Anthony Ross; Baba Diallo
- Home arena: William H. Detrick Gymnasium

2020–21 Northeast Conference men's basketball standings
	Conf.				Overall
Team	W		L	PCT	W		L	PCT
Wagner	13	–	5	.722	13	–	7	.650
Bryant	10	–	4	.714	15	–	7	.682
Sacred Heart	9	–	7	.563	9	–	9	.500
Mount St. Mary's †	9	–	7	.563	12	–	11	.522
Merrimack*	9	–	9	.500	9	–	9	.500
LIU	9	–	9	.500	9	–	9	.500
St. Francis Brooklyn	9	–	9	.500	9	–	10	.474
Fairleigh Dickinson	8	–	10	.444	9	–	15	.375
Saint Francis (PA)	5	–	13	.278	6	–	16	.273
Central Connecticut	5	–	13	.278	5	–	16	.238
† 2021 NEC tournament winner * ineligible for the 2021 NCAA tournament due to transition period

The 2020–21 Central Connecticut Blue Devils men's basketball team represented Central Connecticut State University during the 2020–21 NCAA Division I men's basketball season. The Blue Devils are led by fifth-year head coach Donyell Marshall, and play their home games at the William H. Detrick Gymnasium in New Britain, Connecticut as members of the Northeast Conference.

== Previous season ==
The Blue Devils finished the 2019–20 season, 4–27, 3–15 in NEC play to finish in last place. They failed to qualify for the NEC tournament.

== Roster ==
2020–21 Central Connecticut Blue Devils men's basketball team
Players
Coaches

Pos.	#	Name	Height	Weight	Year	Hometown
G/F	0	Greg Outlaw	6 ft 4 in (1.93 m)	175 lb (79 kg)	So	Chicago, Illinois
G	1	Nigel Scantlebury	6 ft 0 in (1.83 m)	170 lb (77 kg)	Jr	Rochester, New York
G	2	Myles Baker	6 ft 3 in (1.91 m)	195 lb (88 kg)	So	Chicago, Illinois
G	3	Ian Krishnan	6 ft 2 in (1.88 m)	180 lb (82 kg)	Jr	Boyds, Maryland
F	5	Xavier Wilson	6 ft 7 in (2.01 m)	210 lb (95 kg)	So	Spring Valley, New York
G	10	Zach Newkirk	6 ft 1 in (1.85 m)	185 lb (84 kg)	Jr	Raleigh, North Carolina
G	11	Tre Mitchell	6 ft 3 in (1.91 m)	170 lb (77 kg)	Jr	Phoenix, Arizona
G	13	Jamir Reed	6 ft 4 in (1.93 m)	200 lb (91 kg)	So	Philadelphia, Pennsylvania
F	20	Stephane Ayangma	6 ft 6 in (1.98 m)	215 lb (98 kg)	Sr	Yaoundé, Cameroon
F	23	Karrington Wallace	6 ft 8 in (2.03 m)	210 lb (95 kg)	Jr	Philadelphia, Pennsylvania
C	24	Ola Olamuyiwa	6 ft 10 in (2.08 m)	230 lb (104 kg)	So	Lagos, Nigeria

Head coach

- Donyell Marshall (Connecticut)

Assistant coach(es)

- Mike Witcoskie (Susquehanna)
- Anthony Ross (East Stroudsburg)
- Baba Diallo (Baker)

Legend

- (C) Team captain
- (S) Suspended
- (I) Ineligible
- (W) Walk-on
- Injured
- Current redshirt

Roster
Last update: December 28, 2020

== Schedule and results ==
Date time, TV	Rank^{#}	Opponent^{#}	Result	Record	Site (attendance) city, state
Regular season
November 25, 2020*; 8:00 pm, FS1		at UConn	L 75–102	0–1	Gampel Pavilion (125); Storrs, CT
November 27, 2020*; 2:00 pm		vs. Army	L 57–79	0–2	Mohegan Sun Arena; Uncasville, CT
December 4, 2020*; 7:00 pm, ESPN3		at Hartford	L 65–80	0–3	Chase Arena at Reich Family Pavilion; West Hartford, CT
December 8, 2020; 3:00 pm		at Fairleigh Dickinson	W 94–87	1–3 (1–0)	Rothman Center; Hackensack, NJ
December 9, 2020; 12:00 pm		at Fairleigh Dickinson	L 71–79	1–4 (1–1)	Rothman Center; Hackensack, NJ
December 15, 2021; 5:00 pm		St. Francis Brooklyn	L 86–91	1–5 (1–2)	William H. Detrick Gymnasium; New Britain, CT
December 16, 2020; 1:00 pm		St. Francis Brooklyn	W 78–59	2–5 (2–2)	William H. Detrick Gymnasium; New Britain, CT
January 7, 2021; 7:00 pm		at Bryant	L 68–93	2–6 (2–3)	Chace Athletic Center; Smithfield, RI
January 8, 2021; 4:00 pm		at Bryant	L 64–76	2–7 (2–4)	Chace Athletic Center; Smithfield, RI
January 14, 2021; 7:00 pm		at Sacred Heart	L 48–65	2–8 (2–5)	William H. Pitt Center; Fairfield, CT
January 21, 2021; 7:00 pm		Mount St. Mary's	L 57–67	2–9 (2–6)	William H. Detrick Gymnasium; New Britain, CT
January 22, 2020; 4:00 pm		Mount St. Mary's	W 65–64	3–9 (3–6)	William H. Detrick Gymnasium; New Britain, CT
January 30, 2021; 7:00 pm		at Saint Francis (PA)	L 59–62	3–10 (3–7)	DeGol Arena; Loretto, PA
January 31, 2021; 4:00 pm		at Saint Francis (PA)	W 85–77	4–10 (4–7)	DeGol Arena; Loretto, PA
February 4, 2021; 7:00 pm		Sacred Heart	Postponed		William H. Detrick Gymnasium; New Britain, CT
February 11, 2021; 7:00 pm		Merrimack	L 46–62	4–11 (4–8)	William H. Detrick Gymnasium; New Britain, CT
February 12, 2021; 7:00 pm		Merrimack	L 52–72	4–12 (4–9)	William H. Detrick Gymnasium; New Britain, CT
February 17, 2021; 5:00 pm		Sacred Heart	L 70–82	4–13 (4–10)	William H. Detrick Gymnasium; New Britain, CT
February 20, 2021; 7:00 pm		at LIU	L 74–87	4–14 (4–11)	Steinberg Wellness Center; Brooklyn, NY
February 21, 2021; 4:00 pm		at LIU	L 79–81	4–15 (4–12)	Steinberg Wellness Center; Brooklyn, NY
February 25, 2021; 7:00 pm		Wagner	L 63–83	4–16 (4–13)	William H. Detrick Gymnasium; New Britain, CT
February 26, 2021; 4:00 pm		Wagner	W 83–77	5–16 (5–13)	William H. Detrick Gymnasium; New Britain, CT
*Non-conference game. ^{#}Rankings from AP Poll. (#) Tournament seedings in parentheses. All times are in Eastern.
