= 2020–21 Wagner Seahawks men's basketball team =

American college basketball season

2020–21 Wagner Seahawks men's basketball
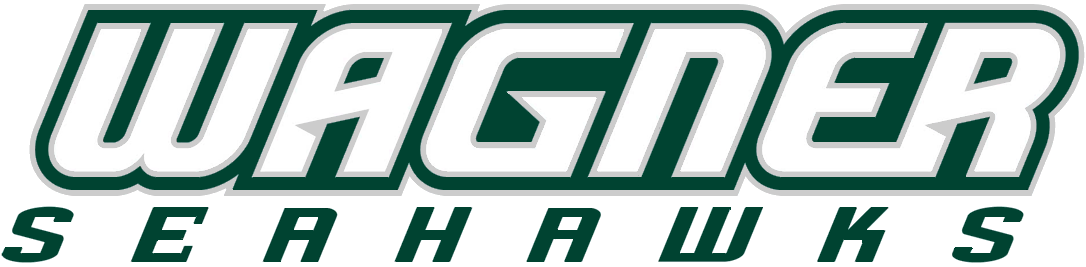

NEC regular-season champions
- Conference: Northeast Conference
- Record: 13–7 (13–5 NEC)
- Head coach: Bashir Mason (9th season)
- Assistant coaches: Donald Copeland; Winston Smith; Bobbyy Jordan
- Home arena: Spiro Sports Center

2020–21 Northeast Conference men's basketball standings
| | Conf. | | | | Overall |
| Team | W | | L | PCT | W | | L | PCT |
|---|---|---|---|---|---|---|---|---|
| Wagner | 13 | – | 5 | .722 | 13 | – | 7 | .650 |
| Bryant | 10 | – | 4 | .714 | 15 | – | 7 | .682 |
| Sacred Heart | 9 | – | 7 | .563 | 9 | – | 9 | .500 |
| Mount St. Mary's † | 9 | – | 7 | .563 | 12 | – | 11 | .522 |
| Merrimack* | 9 | – | 9 | .500 | 9 | – | 9 | .500 |
| LIU | 9 | – | 9 | .500 | 9 | – | 9 | .500 |
| St. Francis Brooklyn | 9 | – | 9 | .500 | 9 | – | 10 | .474 |
| Fairleigh Dickinson | 8 | – | 10 | .444 | 9 | – | 15 | .375 |
| Saint Francis (PA) | 5 | – | 13 | .278 | 6 | – | 16 | .273 |
| Central Connecticut | 5 | – | 13 | .278 | 5 | – | 16 | .238 |
† 2021 NEC tournament winner * ineligible for the 2021 NCAA tournament due to transition period

The 2020–21 Wagner Seahawks men's basketball team represented Wagner College during the 2020–21 NCAA Division I men's basketball season. The Seahawks were led by ninth-year head coach Bashir Mason. They played their home games at Spiro Sports Center on the school's Staten Island campus as members of the Northeast Conference (NEC).

== Previous season ==
The Seahawks finished the 2019–20 season 8–21, 5–13 in NEC play, to finish in tenth place. They failed to qualify for the NEC tournament.

== Roster ==
2020–21 Wagner Seahawks men's basketball team
Players
Coaches

| Pos. | # | Name | Height | Weight | Year | Previous school | Hometown |
|---|---|---|---|---|---|---|---|
| F | 0 | Nigel Jackson | 6 ft 7 in (2.01 m) | 215 lb (98 kg) | Sr | Mount Saint Joseph HS | Baltimore, MD |
| G | 1 | Atiba Taylor | 6 ft 4 in (1.93 m) | 180 lb (82 kg) | Jr | Hackensack HS; Youngstown State | Garfield, NJ |
| G | 2 | Alex Morales | 6 ft 6 in (1.98 m) | 180 lb (82 kg) | Sr | Mainland Regional HS; Prince George's CC | Paterson, NJ |
| G | 3 | Delonnie Hunt | 6 ft 0 in (1.83 m) | 160 lb (73 kg) | Fr | Rock Creek Christian HS | Upper Marlboro, MD |
| G | 4 | Elijah Ford | 6 ft 5 in (1.96 m) | 205 lb (93 kg) | Sr | Weequahic HS; Barton CC | Newark, NJ |
| G | 5 | Jordan Mason | 6 ft 4 in (1.93 m) | 205 lb (93 kg) | So | Dexter Southfield HS | Boston, MA |
| G | 11 | Will Martinez | 6 ft 5 in (1.96 m) | 190 lb (86 kg) | Sr | Wings Academy; Monroe College | The Bronx, NY |
| G | 12 | Chase Freeman | 5 ft 11 in (1.8 m) | 180 lb (82 kg) | Sr | Station Camp HS | Gallatin, TN |
| G | 13 | Ashton Miller | 6 ft 5 in (1.96 m) | 200 lb (91 kg) | So | Seton Hall Prep; Duquesne | Scotch Plains, NJ |
| G | 15 | Elijah Allen | 6 ft 2 in (1.88 m) | 185 lb (84 kg) | Fr | Dover HS | Dover, DE |
| F | 22 | Ja'Mier Fletcher | 6 ft 7 in (2.01 m) | 230 lb (104 kg) | So | Steel Valley HS | Pittsburgh, PA |
| C | 24 | Justin Brown | 6 ft 10 in (2.08 m) | 205 lb (93 kg) | RS Jr | Marist HS; Chattanooga | Chicago, IL |
| C | 25 | DeAndre Wilkins | 6 ft 11 in (2.11 m) | 235 lb (107 kg) | So | Great Bridge Academy | Edenton, NC |

Head coach

- Bashir Mason (Drexel)

Assistant coach(es)

- Donald Copeland (Seton Hall)
- Winston Smith (Massachusetts)
- Bobby Jordan (Drexel)

Legend

- (C) Team captain
- (S) Suspended
- (I) Ineligible
- (W) Walk-on
- Injured
- Current redshirt

Roster
Last update: December 29, 2020

== Schedule and results ==
| Date time, TV | Rank^{#} | Opponent^{#} | Result | Record | Site (attendance) city, state |
Regular season
| December 8, 2020*; 5:00 p.m., FS1 | | at Seton Hall | L 45–78 | 0–1 | Prudential Center; Newark, NJ |
| December 16, 2020; 4:00 p.m. | | at Bryant | L 62–74 | 0–2 (0–1) | Chace Athletic Center; Smithfield, RI |
| December 17, 2020; 4:00 p.m. | | at Bryant | L 75–81 | 0–3 (0–2) | Chase Athletic Center; Smithfield, RI |
| December 21, 2021; 7:00 p.m., SNY/ESPN3 | | Sacred Heart | W 74–46 | 1–3 (1–2) | Spiro Sports Center; Staten Island, NY |
| December 22, 2020; 4:00 p.m. | | Sacred Heart | L 85–86 ^{2OT} | 1–4 (1–3) | Spiro Sports Center; Staten Island, NY |
| January 14, 2021; 7:00 p.m. | | LIU | L 66–77 | 1–5 (1–4) | Spiro Sports Center; Staten Island, NY |
| January 15, 2021; 7:00 p.m. | | LIU | W 76–74 | 2–5 (2–4) | Spiro Sports Center; Staten Island, NY |
| January 30, 2021; 7:00 p.m. | | Merrimack | Postponed due to COVID-19 | | Spiro Sports Center; Staten Island, NY |
| January 31, 2021; 4:00 p.m. | | Merrimack | Postponed due to COVID-19 | | Spiro Sports Center; Staten Island, NY |
| February 4, 2021; 7:00 p.m. | | at St. Francis Brooklyn | W 74–67 | 3–5 (3–4) | Generoso Pope Athletic Complex; Brooklyn, NY |
| February 5, 2021; 4:00 p.m. | | at St. Francis Brooklyn | W 84–81 ^{OT} | 4–5 (4–4) | Generoso Pope Athletic Complex; Brooklyn, NY |
| February 11, 2021; 7:00 p.m. | | Fairleigh Dickinson | W 76–72 | 5–5 (5–4) | Spiro Sports Center; Staten Island, NY |
| February 13, 2021; 7:00 p.m. | | at Fairleigh Dickinson | W 95–86 | 6–5 (6–4) | Rothman Center; Hackensack, NJ |
| February 16, 2021; 7:00 p.m. | | at Mount St. Mary's | W 61–39 | 7–5 (7–4) | Knott Arena; Emmitsburg, MD |
| February 17, 2021; 4:00 p.m. | | at Mount St. Mary's | W 57–55 | 8–5 (8–4) | Knott Arena; Emmitsburg, MD |
| February 20, 2021; 7:00 p.m. | | Saint Francis (PA) | W 67–52 | 9–5 (9–4) | Spiro Sports Center; Staten Island, NY |
| February 21, 2021; 4:00 p.m. | | Saint Francis (PA) | W 70–68 | 10–5 (10–4) | Spiro Sports Center; Staten Island, NY |
| February 25, 2021; 7:00 p.m. | | at Central Connecticut | W 83–63 | 11–5 (11–4) | William H. Detrick Gymnasium; New Britain, CT |
| February 26, 2021; 4:00 p.m. | | at Central Connecticut | L 77–83 | 11–6 (11–5) | William H. Detrick Gymnasium; New Britain, CT |
| March 2, 2021; 4:00 p.m. | | Merrimack; Rescheduled from January 30 | W 74–67 | 12–6 (12–5) | Spiro Sports Center; Staten Island, NY |
| March 3, 2021; 4:00 p.m., NEC Front Row | | Merrimack; Rescheduled from January 31 | W 64–59 | 13–6 (13–5) | Spiro Sports Center; Staten Island, NY |
NEC tournament
| March 6, 2021; 2:00 p.m., NEC Front Row, ESPN3 | (1) | (4) Mount St. Mary's; Semifinals | L 60–66 | 13–7 | Spiro Sports Center; Staten Island, NY |
*Non-conference game. ^{#}Rankings from AP poll. (#) Tournament seedings in parentheses. All times are in Eastern.
