= 2020–21 Saint Francis Red Flash men's basketball team =

American college basketball season

2020–21 Saint Francis Red Flash men's basketball
- Conference: Northeast Conference
- Record: 6–16 (5–13 NEC)
- Head coach: Rob Krimmel (9th season)
- Associate head coach: Andrew Helton
- Assistant coaches: Eric Taylor; Umar Shannon
- Home arena: DeGol Arena

2020–21 Northeast Conference men's basketball standings
| | Conf. | | | | Overall |
| Team | W | | L | PCT | W | | L | PCT |
|---|---|---|---|---|---|---|---|---|
| Wagner | 13 | – | 5 | .722 | 13 | – | 7 | .650 |
| Bryant | 10 | – | 4 | .714 | 15 | – | 7 | .682 |
| Sacred Heart | 9 | – | 7 | .563 | 9 | – | 9 | .500 |
| Mount St. Mary's † | 9 | – | 7 | .563 | 12 | – | 11 | .522 |
| Merrimack* | 9 | – | 9 | .500 | 9 | – | 9 | .500 |
| LIU | 9 | – | 9 | .500 | 9 | – | 9 | .500 |
| St. Francis Brooklyn | 9 | – | 9 | .500 | 9 | – | 10 | .474 |
| Fairleigh Dickinson | 8 | – | 10 | .444 | 9 | – | 15 | .375 |
| Saint Francis (PA) | 5 | – | 13 | .278 | 6 | – | 16 | .273 |
| Central Connecticut | 5 | – | 13 | .278 | 5 | – | 16 | .238 |
† 2021 NEC tournament winner * ineligible for the 2021 NCAA tournament due to transition period

The 2020–21 Saint Francis Red Flash men's basketball team represented Saint Francis University during the 2020–21 NCAA Division I men's basketball season. The Red Flash, led by ninth-year head coach Rob Krimmel, played their home games at the DeGol Arena in Loretto, Pennsylvania as members of the Northeast Conference (NEC).

== Previous season ==
The Red Flash finished the 2019–20 season 22–10, 13–5 in NEC play, to finish in a share for second place. They defeated Bryant and Sacred Heart to reach the championship game of the NEC tournament where they lost to Robert Morris. With 22 wins, they were a candidate for postseason play. However, all postseason tournaments were cancelled amid the COVID-19 pandemic.

== Roster ==
2020–21 Saint Francis Red Flash men's basketball team
Players
Coaches

| Pos. | # | Name | Height | Weight | Year | Previous school | Hometown |
|---|---|---|---|---|---|---|---|
| G | 0 | Justen Anderson | 6 ft 2 in (1.88 m) | 170 lb (77 kg) | RS Fr | La Plata HS | Waldorf, MD |
| G | 1 | Zahree Harrison | 6 ft 0 in (1.83 m) | 190 lb (86 kg) | Fr | Cheltenham HS | West Philadelphia, PA |
| G | 2 | Ramiir Dixon-Conover | 6 ft 3 in (1.91 m) | 185 lb (84 kg) | RS Sr | South Kent School; Southeastern CC | Newark, NJ |
| G | 3 | Luke Ruggery | 5 ft 11 in (1.8 m) | 160 lb (73 kg) | RS Fr | Bishop Guilfoyle HS | Duncansville, PA |
| G | 4 | Ronell Giles Jr. | 6 ft 4 in (1.93 m) | 185 lb (84 kg) | Fr | Charles Herbert Flowers HS | Brandywine, MD |
| F | 5 | Myles Thompson | 6 ft 6 in (1.98 m) | 230 lb (104 kg) | Jr | Camden HS | Camden, NJ |
| G/F | 11 | Maxwell Land | 6 ft 4 in (1.93 m) | 185 lb (84 kg) | RS Fr | Moeller HS | Cincinnati, Ohio |
| F | 13 | Marlon Hargis | 6 ft 7 in (2.01 m) | 205 lb (93 kg) | Jr | St. Augustine Prep; Holy Cross | Mays Landing, NJ |
| G | 14 | A. J. Burch | 5 ft 9 in (1.75 m) | 165 lb (75 kg) | So | Severn School | Annapolis, MD |
| F | 15 | Chukwu Ikediashi | 6 ft 8 in (2.03 m) | 220 lb (100 kg) | RS So | Hudson Catholic HS | Hoboken, NJ |
| G | 20 | Dan Henry | 5 ft 11 in (1.8 m) | 160 lb (73 kg) | Sr | Hamburg HS | Hamburg, NY |
| G | 21 | Ben Seidel | 6 ft 0 in (1.83 m) | 170 lb (77 kg) | So | Bishop McCort HS | Johnstown, PA |
| G/F | 22 | Tyler Stewart | 6 ft 8 in (2.03 m) | 195 lb (88 kg) | RS Jr | Binghamton | Silver Spring, MD |
| G | 23 | A. J. Labriola (W) | 6 ft 2 in (1.88 m) | 185 lb (84 kg) | Jr | Bishop Guilfoyle HS | Altoona, PA |
| G | 24 | Bryce Laskey | 6 ft 4 in (1.93 m) | 190 lb (86 kg) | RS So | Laurel Highlands HS | Uniontown, PA |
| G | 31 | Brad McCabe | 6 ft 6 in (1.98 m) | 185 lb (84 kg) | RS Fr | Manasquan HS | Manasquan, NJ |
| F | 32 | Jeriah Coleman | 7 ft 0 in (2.13 m) | 220 lb (100 kg) | RS Fr | Great Bridge HS | Anchorage, Alaska |
| F | 33 | Josh Cohen | 6 ft 10 in (2.08 m) | 220 lb (100 kg) | RS Fr | Christian Brothers Academy | Lincroft, NJ |
| F | 42 | Mark Flagg | 6 ft 9 in (2.06 m) | 215 lb (98 kg) | Sr | Pennsbury HS | Fairless Hills, PA |

Head coach

- Rob Krimmel (Saint Francis (PA))

Assistant coach(es)

- Andrew Helton (Miami (OH))
- Eric Taylor (Saint Francis (PA))
- Umar Shannon (Saint Francis (PA))

Legend

- (C) Team captain
- (S) Suspended
- (I) Ineligible
- (W) Walk-on
- Injured
- Current redshirt

Roster
Last update: December 30, 2020

== Schedule and results ==
| Date time, TV | Rank^{#} | Opponent^{#} | Result | Record | Site (attendance) city, state |
Non-conference regular season
| November 25, 2020*; 7:00 p.m., ATTSNPT | | at Pittsburgh | W 80–70 | 1–0 | Petersen Events Center (500); Pittsburgh, PA |
| November 28, 2020*; 3:00 p.m., NEC Front Row | | UMBC | L 65–80 | 1–1 | DeGol Arena; Loretto, PA |
| December 1, 2020*; 4:00 p.m., ACCN | | at No. 15 Virginia | L 51–76 | 1–2 | John Paul Jones Arena (250); Charlottesville, VA |
| December 3, 2020*; 7:00 p.m., ESPN+ | | at Liberty | L 62–78 | 1–3 | Liberty Arena (250); Lynchburg, VA |
NEC regular season
| December 8, 2020; 7:00 p.m., NEC Front Row | | at Mount St. Mary's | L 57–75 | 1–4 (0–1) | Knott Arena; Emmitsburg, MD |
| January 7, 2021; 7:00 p.m., NEC Front Row | | at LIU | L 75–78 | 1–5 (0–2) | Steinberg Wellness Center; Brooklyn, NY |
| January 8, 2021; 4:00 p.m., NEC Front Row | | at LIU | L 58–71 | 1–6 (0–3) | Steinberg Wellness Center; Brooklyn, NY |
| January 14, 2021; 7:00 p.m., ESPN+ | | Bryant | W 89–82 | 2–6 (1–3) | DeGol Arena; Loretto, PA |
| January 15, 2021; 4:00 p.m., NEC Front Row | | Bryant | L 63–72 | 2–7 (1–4) | DeGol Arena; Loretto, PA |
| January 21, 2021; 7:00 p.m., NEC Front Row | | at Sacred Heart | W 76–58 | 3–7 (2–4) | William H. Pitt Center; Fairfield, CT |
| January 22, 2021; 4:00 p.m., NEC Front Row | | at Sacred Heart | L 70–82 | 3–8 (2–5) | William H. Pitt Center; Fairfield, CT |
| January 26, 2021; 7:00 p.m., NEC Front Row | | Fairleigh Dickinson | L 92–94 ^{OT} | 3–9 (2–6) | DeGol Arena; Loretto, PA |
| January 27, 2021; 4:00 p.m., NEC Front Row | | Fairleigh Dickinson | W 90–82 | 4–9 (3–6) | DeGol Arena; Loretto, PA |
| January 30, 2021; 7:00 p.m., NEC Front Row | | Central Connecticut | W 62–59 | 5–9 (4–6) | DeGol Arena; Loretto, PA |
| January 31, 2021; 4:00 p.m., NEC Front Row | | Central Connecticut | L 77–85 | 5–10 (4–7) | DeGol Arena; Loretto, PA |
| February 4, 2021; 4:00 p.m., NEC Front Row | | at Merrimack | L 62–68 | 5–11 (4–8) | Hammel Court; North Andover, MA |
| February 5, 2021; 4:00 p.m., NEC Front Row | | at Merrimack | L 54–59 | 5–12 (4–9) | Hammel Court; North Andover, MA |
| February 11, 2021; 7:00 p.m., NEC Front Row | | St. Francis Brooklyn | L 67–70 | 5–13 (4–10) | DeGol Arena; Loretto, PA |
| February 12, 2021; 4:00 p.m., NEC Front Row | | St. Francis Brooklyn | W 80–66 | 6–13 (5–10) | DeGol Arena; Loretto, PA |
| February 20, 2021; 7:00 p.m., NEC Front Row | | at Wagner | L 52–67 | 6–14 (5–11) | Spiro Sports Center; Staten Island, NY |
| February 21, 2021; 4:00 p.m., NEC Front Row | | at Wagner | L 68–70 | 6–15 (5–12) | Spiro Sports Center; Staten Island, NY |
| February 25, 2021; 7:00 p.m., NEC Front Row | | Mount St. Mary's | L 65–72 | 6–16 (5–13) | DeGol Arena; Loretto, PA |
*Non-conference game. ^{#}Rankings from AP poll. (#) Tournament seedings in parentheses. All times are in Eastern Time.
