= 2020–21 Bryant Bulldogs men's basketball team =

American college basketball season

2020–21 Bryant Bulldogs men's basketball
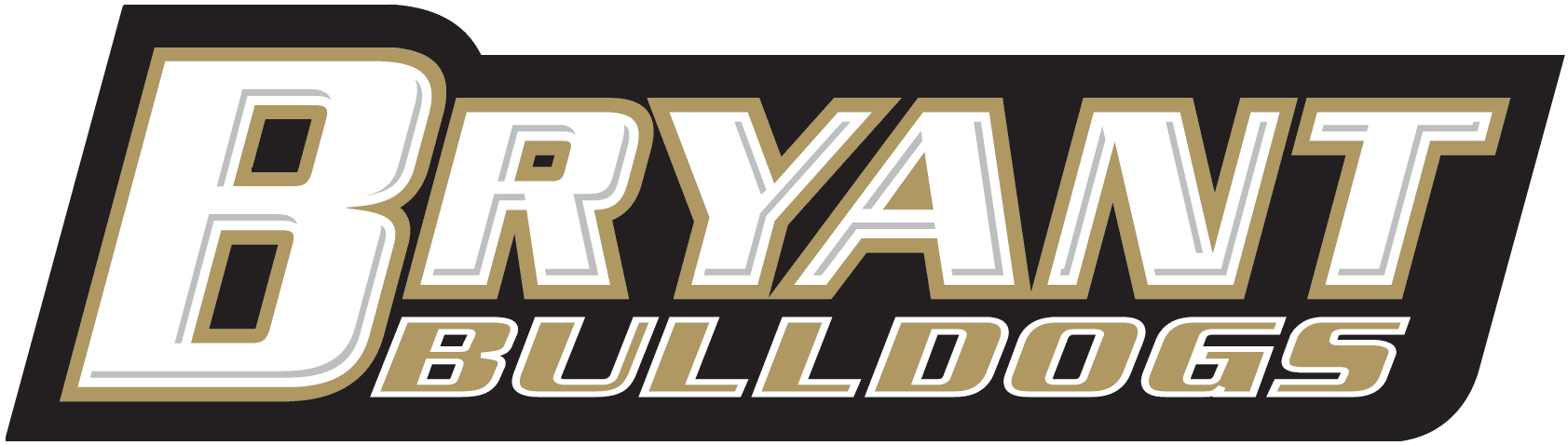

CBI, Quarterfinals
- Conference: Northeast Conference
- Record: 15–7 (10–4 NEC)
- Head coach: Jared Grasso (3rd season)
- Assistant coaches: Phil Martelli, Jr.; Chris Cole; Eamonn Mahar
- Home arena: Chace Athletic Center

2020–21 Northeast Conference men's basketball standings
	Conf.				Overall
Team	W		L	PCT	W		L	PCT
Wagner	13	–	5	.722	13	–	7	.650
Bryant	10	–	4	.714	15	–	7	.682
Sacred Heart	9	–	7	.563	9	–	9	.500
Mount St. Mary's †	9	–	7	.563	12	–	11	.522
Merrimack*	9	–	9	.500	9	–	9	.500
LIU	9	–	9	.500	9	–	9	.500
St. Francis Brooklyn	9	–	9	.500	9	–	10	.474
Fairleigh Dickinson	8	–	10	.444	9	–	15	.375
Saint Francis (PA)	5	–	13	.278	6	–	16	.273
Central Connecticut	5	–	13	.278	5	–	16	.238
† 2021 NEC tournament winner * ineligible for the 2021 NCAA tournament due to transition period

The 2020–21 Bryant Bulldogs men's basketball team represented Bryant University during the 2020–21 NCAA Division I men's basketball season. The Bulldogs are led by third-year head coach Jared Grasso, and play their home games at the Chace Athletic Center in Smithfield, Rhode Island as members of the Northeast Conference. They finished the season 15-7, 10-4 to finish in 2nd place. They defeated Sacred Heart in the semifinals of the NEC tournament before losing in the championship game to Mount St. Mary’s. They received an invitation to the CBI where they lost to Coastal Carolina in the quarterfinals.

== Previous season ==
The Bulldogs finished the 2019–20 season 15–17, 7–11 in NEC play to finish in a three-way tie for seventh place. They lost in the quarterfinals of the NEC tournament to Saint Francis (PA).

== Roster ==
2020–21 Bryant Bulldogs men's basketball team
Players
Coaches

Pos.	#	Name	Height	Weight	Year	Hometown
G	0	Darius Guinn	6 ft 7 in (2.01 m)	195 lb (88 kg)	RS Jr	Portland, Oregon
G	1	Joe Moon IV	6 ft 1 in (1.85 m)	185 lb (84 kg)	Fr	Westland, Michigan
G	2	Erickson Bans	5 ft 11 in (1.8 m)	165 lb (75 kg)	Fr	Pawtucket, Rhode Island
G	3	Michael Green III	5 ft 11 in (1.8 m)	155 lb (70 kg)	So	Bronx, New York
F	4	Nathaniel Stokes	6 ft 8 in (2.03 m)	205 lb (93 kg)	So	Tacoma, Washington
G	5	Charles Pride	6 ft 4 in (1.93 m)	185 lb (84 kg)	So	Syracuse, New York
G	10	Luis Hurtado Jr.	6 ft 6 in (1.98 m)	210 lb (95 kg)	RS Jr	Mérida, Venezuela
G	11	Melo Eggleston	6 ft 8 in (2.03 m)	200 lb (91 kg)	RS Jr	Suitland, Maryland
G	12	Timmy Kiggins	6 ft 0 in (1.83 m)	170 lb (77 kg)	So	Westbury, New York
C	24	Dren Dedushaj	7 ft 2 in (2.18 m)	225 lb (102 kg)	RS Jr	Brooklyn, New York
G	30	Chris Childs	6 ft 2 in (1.88 m)	180 lb (82 kg)	Jr	Bronx, New York
G	32	Peter Kiss	6 ft 5 in (1.96 m)	200 lb (91 kg)	RS Sr	New York, New York
F/C	33	Nick Crocker	6 ft 10 in (2.08 m)	225 lb (102 kg)	RS Jr	East Falmouth, Massachusetts
F	34	Hall Elias	6 ft 8 in (2.03 m)	230 lb (104 kg)	RS Sr	Valley Stream, New York
F	35	Luke Sutherland	6 ft 7 in (2.01 m)	203 lb (92 kg)	RS So	Syracuse, New York
F	55	Kai Kostmayer	6 ft 8 in (2.03 m)	220 lb (100 kg)	Fr	Southbury, Connecticut

Head coach

- Jared Grasso (Quinnipiac)

Assistant coach(es)

- Phil Martelli Jr. (Saint Joseph's)
- Chris Cole (New Mexico State)
- Eamonn Mahar (SUNY Cortland)

Legend

- (C) Team captain
- (S) Suspended
- (I) Ineligible
- (W) Walk-on
- Injured
- Current redshirt

Roster
Last update: December 27, 2020

== Schedule and results ==
Date time, TV	Rank^{#}	Opponent^{#}	Result	Record	Site (attendance) city, state
Non-conference regular season
November 27, 2020*; 3:00 pm, ACCN		at Syracuse	L 84–85	0–1	Carrier Dome; Syracuse, NY
December 1, 2020*; 4:00 pm, ESPN3		at New Hampshire	W 93–85	1–1	Lundholm Gym; Durham, New Hampshire
December 5, 2020*; 3:00 pm		Rhode Island College	W 138–83	2–1	Chace Athletic Center; Smithfield, RI
December 8, 2020; 7:00 pm		at St. Francis Brooklyn	W 101–82	3–1 (1–0)	Generoso Pope Athletic Complex; Brooklyn, NY
December 9, 2020; 4:00 pm		at St. Francis Brooklyn	L 91–93	3–2 (1–1)	Generoso Pope Athletic Complex; Brooklyn, NY
December 12, 2020*; 1:00 pm		Stony Brook	W 81–72	4–2	Chase Athletic Center; Smithfield, RI
December 16, 2020; 4:00 pm		Wagner	W 74–62	5–2 (2–1)	Chase Athletic Center; Smithfield, RI
December 17, 2020; 4:00 pm		Wagner	W 81–75	6–2 (3–1)	Chase Athletic Center; Smithfield, RI
December 21, 2020*; 7:00 pm, ESPN+		at UMass	W 93–88	7–2	Mullins Center; Amherst, MA
January 7, 2021; 7:00 pm		Central Connecticut	W 93–68	8–2 (4–1)	Chace Athletic Center; Smithfield, RI
January 8, 2021; 4:00 pm		Central Connecticut	W 76–64	9–2 (5–1)	Chace Athletic Center; Smithfield, RI
January 14, 2021; 7:00 pm		at Saint Francis (PA)	L 82–89	9–3 (5–2)	DeGol Arena; Loretto, PA
January 15, 2021; 4:00 pm		at Saint Francis (PA)	W 72–63	10–3 (6–2)	DeGol Arena; Loretto, PA
January 30, 2021; 7:00 pm		at Fairleigh Dickinson	L 79–81	10–4 (6–3)	Rothman Center; Hackensack, NJ
January 31, 2021; 4:00 pm		at Fairleigh Dickinson	L 84–95	10–5 (6–4)	Rothman Center; Hackensack, NJ
February 20, 2021; 4:00 pm		Merrimack	W 60–58	11–5 (7–4)	Chase Athletic Center; Smithfield, RI
February 21, 2021; 4:00 pm		at Merrimack	W 76–60	12–5 (8–4)	Hammel Court; North Andover, MA
February 25, 2021; 7:00 pm		LIU	W 87–80	13–5 (9–4)	Chase Athletic Center; Smithfield, RI
February 26, 2021; 4:00 pm		LIU	W 63–60	14–5 (10–4)	Chace Athletic Center; Smithfield, RI
March 2, 2021		Mount St. Mary's	Canceled due to COVID-19		Chase Athletic Center; Smithfield, RI
March 3, 2021		Mount St. Mary's	Canceled due to COVID-19		Chase Athletic Center; Smithfield, RI
NEC tournament
March 6, 2021; 12:00 pm, NEC Front Row	(2)	(3) Sacred Heart; Semifinals	W 85–55	15–5	Chase Athletic Center; Smithfield, RI
March 9, 2021; 7:00 pm, ESPN2	(2)	(4) Mount St. Mary's; Championship	L 68–73	15–6	Chase Athletic Center; Smithfield, RI
CBI
March 22, 2021; 2:30 pm, FloSports		vs. Coastal Carolina; Quarterfinals	L 82–93	15–7	Ocean Center; Daytona Beach, FL
*Non-conference game. ^{#}Rankings from AP Poll. (#) Tournament seedings in parentheses. All times are in Eastern Time.

Schedule source:
