= Tom Folliard =

American basketball coach

Biographical details
- Born: July 30, 1940; Washington, D.C., U.S.
- Died: September 28, 2001 (aged 61); Washington, D.C., U.S.

Playing career
- 1959–1962: Providence
- 1965–1966: Rhode Island Diplomats
- 1966–1967: Terryville Oasis
- Position: Forward

Coaching career (HC unless noted)
- 1967–1968: Bryant (freshmen)
- 1968–1978: Bryant
- 1978–1984: Stonehill
- 1984–1991: Florida Tech

Administrative career (AD unless noted)
- 1968–1978: Bryant
- 1978–1984: Stonehill

Head coaching record
- Overall: 399–212

Accomplishments and honors

Championships
- National Invitation Tournament (1961)

Thomas Joseph Folliard (July 30, 1940 – September 28, 2001) was an American basketball coach who was the head men's basketball coach at Bryant College (1968–1978), Stonehill College (1978–1984), and the Florida Institute of Technology (1984–1991).

== Early life ==
A native of Washington, D.C., Folliard was the nephew of Washington Post reporter Edward T. Folliard. After graduating from Gonzaga High School, he attended Providence College, where he was a member of the Providence Friars men's basketball team. Over three seasons (1959 to 1962), he averaged 3.8 points and 1.7 rebounds per game. He was a member of the Friar team that won the 1961 National Invitation Tournament. After graduating, Folliard served for two years in the United States Army. After his discharge he played two seasons in the New England Basketball Association. He was a member of the Rhode Island Diplomats from 1965 to 1966 and the Terryville Oasis from 1966 to 1967.

== Coaching ==
=== Bryant ===
After spending one season as freshman coach at Bryant College, Folliard was promoted to head coach and athletic director in May 1968. Over ten seasons, he led the Bulldogs to an 174–88 and four postseason appearances, including its first NCAA Division II men's basketball tournament appearance, in 1978. His 174 wins remain the most in school history. Folliard negotiated an agreement for the New England Patriots to use the school as a preseason training base, which it continued to do until 2002. He was inducted into the Bryant Hall of Fame in 1988.

=== Stonehill ===
Folliard left Bryant to become the athletic director and basketball coach at Stonehill College. From 1978 to 1984, he led Stonehill to a 102–68 record, including three straight conference championships and NCAA Division II men's basketball tournament appearances. As athletic director, he played a leading role in the creation the Northeast-7 Conference. He was inducted into the Stonehill Hall of Fame in 2003 and the Northeast-10 Hall of Fame in 2006.

=== Florida Tech ===
From 1984 to 1991, Folliard was the men's basketball coach at the Florida Institute of Technology. He took over a team that went 12–54 and failed to win a Sunshine State Conference game over from 1981 to 1984 and led them to a winning season in 1987–88. The following season, Florida Tech defeated two Division I teams (UMass and Boston College) and made its first NCAA Division II men's basketball tournament appearance. In 1989–90, Florida Tech won a school-record 25 games, captured its first SSC regular season title, and made another NCAA tournament appearance. He resigned in 1991, citing burnout. Folliard was inducted into the Florida Tech Sports Hall of Fame in 2003.

== Personal life ==
Folliard's first marriage ended in divorce. His second wife died in 1994. He had four children from his first marriage. He coached both of his sons, Tom Jr. and Kevin, at Florida Tech. Tom Folliard Jr. is the former president and chief executive officer of CarMax.

== Later life and death ==
After retiring from coaching, Folliard returned to Washington, D.C. He was the director of sales and marketing for Barclay Career School, director of marketing and admissions at the Technical Education Center in Rockville, and a senior loan officer for the Accubanc Mortgage Corporation.

Folliard died of cancer on September 28, 2001 at Georgetown University Hospital. He was interred at Arlington National Cemetery.
