= 2021 Northeast Conference men's basketball tournament =

- Classification: Division I
- Season: 2020–21
- Teams: 4
- Site: Campus sites
- Champions: Mount St. Mary's (6th title)
- Winning coach: Dan Engelstad (1st title)
- MVP: Nana Opoku (Mount St. Mary's)
- Television: NEC Front Row, ESPN3, ESPN2

2020–21 Northeast Conference men's basketball standings
	Conf.				Overall
Team	W		L	PCT	W		L	PCT
Wagner	13	–	5	.722	13	–	7	.650
Bryant	10	–	4	.714	15	–	7	.682
Sacred Heart	9	–	7	.563	9	–	9	.500
Mount St. Mary's †	9	–	7	.563	12	–	11	.522
Merrimack*	9	–	9	.500	9	–	9	.500
LIU	9	–	9	.500	9	–	9	.500
St. Francis Brooklyn	9	–	9	.500	9	–	10	.474
Fairleigh Dickinson	8	–	10	.444	9	–	15	.375
Saint Francis (PA)	5	–	13	.278	6	–	16	.273
Central Connecticut	5	–	13	.278	5	–	16	.238
* ineligible for the 2021 NCAA tournament due to transition period
† 2021 NEC tournament winner

The 2021 Northeast Conference men's basketball tournament was the postseason men's basketball tournament for the Northeast Conference for the 2020–21 NCAA Division I men's basketball season. The tournament took place March 6 and 9, 2021 and all tournament games were played on home arenas of the higher-seeded school. The tournament winner received the automatic bid to the NCAA Tournament.

== Seeds ==
Due to complications caused by the COVID-19 pandemic, only the top four teams in the Northeast Conference were eligible to compete in the conference tournament. Teams were seeded by record within the conference, with a tiebreaker system to seed teams with identical conference records.

- Note: Merrimack College joined the Northeast Conference from Division II Northeast-10 Conference in 2019. At the time, the NEC did not allow transitional D-I members to play in the conference tournament, meaning that Warriors would not have been eligible for the NEC Tournament until 2024. After the 2021–22 season, the NEC presidents voted to allow transitional members to compete in the conference tournament starting with their third transitional seasons, making Merrimack eligible for the tournament starting with the 2023 edition.
- Note: On February 28, Bryant announced they had canceled their final two regular season games against Mount St. Mary's because of positive COVID-19 results within Bryant's Tier 1 personnel and subsequent contact tracing. Bryant's status for the postseason had initially been uncertain, but they established their intent to compete in the tournament after meeting Rhode Island Department of Health guidelines. Bryant competed in its semifinal game with just seven players, one of whom was a walk-on.

Seed	School	Conference	Tiebreaker	Tiebreaker 2
1	Wagner	13–5		
2	Bryant	10–4		
3	Sacred Heart	9–7	.450 strength of wins percentage	
4	Mount St. Mary's	9–7	.425 strength of wins percentage	

== Schedule and results ==
Game	Time	Matchup	Score	Television
Semifinals – Saturday, March 6
1	12:00 pm	No. 3 Sacred Heart at No. 2 Bryant	55–85	ESPN3
2	2:00 pm	No. 4 Mount St. Mary's at No. 1 Wagner	66–60	ESPN3
Final – Tuesday, March 9
3	7:00 pm	No. 4 Mount St. Mary's at No. 2 Bryant	73–68	ESPN2
Game times in EST through Semifinals. Game times in EDT through Finals. Rankings denote tournament seed

== Bracket and results ==
Semifinals; Saturday, March 6, 2021; ESPN3
1	Wagner	60
4	Mount St. Mary's	66
2	Bryant	85
3	Sacred Heart	55

Championship; Tuesday, March 9, 2021; ESPN2
4	Mount St. Mary's	73
2	Bryant	68

== See also ==
- 2021 Northeast Conference women's basketball tournament
