= 2020–21 Fairleigh Dickinson Knights men's basketball team =

American college basketball season

2020–21 Fairleigh Dickinson Knights men's basketball
- Conference: Northeast Conference
- Record: 9–15 (8–10 NEC)
- Head coach: Greg Herenda (8th season)
- Associate head coach: Bruce Hamburger
- Assistant coach: Pete Lappas
- Home arena: Rothman Center

2020–21 Northeast Conference men's basketball standings
	Conf.				Overall
Team	W		L	PCT	W		L	PCT
Wagner	13	–	5	.722	13	–	7	.650
Bryant	10	–	4	.714	15	–	7	.682
Sacred Heart	9	–	7	.563	9	–	9	.500
Mount St. Mary's †	9	–	7	.563	12	–	11	.522
Merrimack*	9	–	9	.500	9	–	9	.500
LIU	9	–	9	.500	9	–	9	.500
St. Francis Brooklyn	9	–	9	.500	9	–	10	.474
Fairleigh Dickinson	8	–	10	.444	9	–	15	.375
Saint Francis (PA)	5	–	13	.278	6	–	16	.273
Central Connecticut	5	–	13	.278	5	–	16	.238
† 2021 NEC tournament winner * ineligible for the 2021 NCAA tournament due to transition period

The 2020–21 Fairleigh Dickinson Knights men's basketball team represented Fairleigh Dickinson University in the 2020–21 NCAA Division I men's basketball season. The Knights, led by eighth-year head coach Greg Herenda, played their home games at the Rothman Center in Hackensack, New Jersey as members of the Northeast Conference. In a season limited due to the ongoing COVID-19 pandemic, the Knights finished the season 9–15, 8–10 in NEC play, to finish eighth place. They failed to qualify for the NEC tournament.

== Previous season ==
The Knights finished the 2019–20 season 11–19, 9–9 in NEC play to finish in a tie for fifth place. They lost in the quarterfinals of the NEC tournament to LIU.

== Roster ==
2020–21 Fairleigh Dickinson Knights men's basketball team
Players
Coaches

Pos.	#	Name	Height	Weight	Year	Previous school	Hometown
G	0	Devon Dunn	6 ft 1 in (1.85 m)	175 lb (79 kg)	So	St. John's College HS	Washington, D.C.
G	1	Joe Munden Jr.	6 ft 4 in (1.93 m)	160 lb (73 kg)	Fr	Monsignor Scanlan HS	The Bronx, NY
G	2	Brandon Rush	6 ft 3 in (1.91 m)	175 lb (79 kg)	So	Warrensville Heights HS	Warrensville Heights, OH
G	3	Jahlil Jenkins	6 ft 0 in (1.83 m)	160 lb (73 kg)	Sr	Virginia Academy	Ranson, WV
G	4	Brandon Powell	6 ft 2 in (1.88 m)	185 lb (84 kg)	Jr	Pine Bush HS	Middletown, NY
G	11	Callum Baker	6 ft 0 in (1.83 m)	160 lb (73 kg)	So	Bishop Walsh School	Oakville, Ontario
G	13	Sal Xheraj	6 ft 0 in (1.83 m)	181 lb (82 kg)	Jr	Hasbrouck Heights HS	Hasbrouck Heights, NJ
F	14	Pier-Olivier Racine	6 ft 8 in (2.03 m)	230 lb (104 kg)	Fr	Vanier College	Montreal, Quebec
C	15	Oscar Okeke	7 ft 0 in (2.13 m)	225 lb (102 kg)	Sr	Gulf Coast State	Abuja, Nigeria
F	21	Elyjah Williams	6 ft 7 in (2.01 m)	220 lb (100 kg)	Sr	Evanston HS	Evanston, IL
F	24	Marc Dadika	6 ft 8 in (2.03 m)	210 lb (95 kg)	RS So	St. Mary HS	Saddle Brook, NJ
F	25	Daniel Rodriguez	6 ft 6 in (1.98 m)	221 lb (100 kg)	So	Hudson Catholic HS	Newark, NJ
F	32	John Square Jr.	6 ft 6 in (1.98 m)	195 lb (88 kg)	Fr	St. John's College HS	North Bethesda, MD

Head coach

- Greg Herenda (Merrimack)

Assistant coach(es)

- Bruce Hamburger (Central Connecticut State)
- Pete Lappas (Boston College)

Legend

- (C) Team captain
- (S) Suspended
- (I) Ineligible
- (W) Walk-on
- Injured
- Current redshirt

Roster
Last update: December 22, 2020

== Schedule and results ==
Date time, TV	Rank^{#}	Opponent^{#}	Result	Record	Site (attendance) city, state
Regular season
November 25, 2020*; 4:30 pm		Quinnipiac	L 66–84	0–1	People's United Center; Hamden, CT
November 27, 2020*; 7:00 pm, BTN		at No. 24 Rutgers; New Jersey Hoop Classic	L 75–96	0–2	Rutgers Athletic Center; Piscataway, NJ
November 30, 2020*		at Rider; New Jersey Hoop Classic	Canceled		Alumni Gymnasium; Lawrenceville, NJ
November 30, 2020*; 7:00 pm, FloHoops		at Hofstra; New Jersey Hoop Classic	L 58–73	0–3	Mack Sports Complex; Hempstead, NY
December 5, 2020*; 4:30 pm, FS2		at Providence	L 67–79	0–4	Alumni Hall; Providence, RI
December 8, 2020; 7:00 pm		Central Connecticut	L 87–94	0–5 (0–1)	Rothman Center; Hackensack, NJ
December 9, 2020; 4:00 pm		Central Connecticut	W 79–71	1–5 (1–1)	Rothman Center; Hackensack, NJ
December 19, 2020*; 2:00 pm		Drexel	L 68–85	1–6	Rothman Center; Hackensack, NJ
December 22, 2020*; 4:00 pm		at Fairfield	W 69–65	2–6	Alumni Hall; Fairfield, CT
January 21, 2021; 7:00 pm, NEC Front Row		at Merrimack	L 51–62	2–7 (1–2)	Hammel Court; North Andover, MA
January 22, 2021; 4:00 pm, NEC Front Row		at Merrimack	L 71–76	2–8 (1–3)	Hammel Court; North Andover, MA
January 26, 2021; 7:00 pm, NEC Front Row		at Saint Francis (PA)	W 94–92 ^{OT}	3–8 (2–3)	DeGol Arena; Loretto, PA
January 27, 2021; 4:00 pm, NEC Front Row		at Saint Francis (PA)	L 82–90	3–9 (2–4)	DeGol Arena; Loretto, PA
January 30, 2021; 7:00 pm, NEC Front Row		Bryant	W 81–79	4–9 (3–4)	Rothman Center; Hackensack, NJ
January 31, 2021; 4:00 pm, NEC Front Row		Bryant	W 95–84	5–9 (4–4)	Rothman Center; Hackensack, NJ
February 4, 2021; NEC Front Row		at LIU	W 78–70	6–9 (5–4)	Steinberg Wellness Center; Brooklyn, NY
February 5, 2021; NEC Front Row		at LIU	W 77–62	7–9 (6–4)	Steinberg Wellness Center; Brooklyn, NY
February 11, 2021; 7:00 pm, NEC Front Row		at Wagner	L 72–76	7–10 (6–5)	Spiro Sports Center; Staten Island, NY
February 13, 2021; 7:00 pm, NEC Front Row		Wagner	L 86–95	7–11 (6–6)	Rothman Center; Hackensack, NJ
January 16, 2021; 7:00 pm, NEC Front Row		St. Francis Brooklyn	L 75–83	7–12 (6–7)	Rothman Center; Hackensack, NJ
January 17, 2021; 7:00 pm, NEC Front Row		St. Francis Brooklyn	L 87–90	7–13 (6–8)	Rothman Center; Hackensack, NJ
February 20, 2021; 2:00 pm, SNY/ESPN3		Mount St. Mary's	W 76–71	8–13 (7–8)	Rothman Center; Hackensack, NJ
February 21, 2021; 2:00 pm, NEC Front Row		Mount St. Mary's	L 61–74	8–14 (7–9)	Rothman Center; Hackensack, NJ
February 25, 2021; 7:00 pm, NEC Front Row		at Sacred Heart	W 82–69	9–14 (8–9)	William H. Pitt Center; Fairfield, CT
February 26, 2021; 7:00 pm, NEC Front Row		at Sacred Heart	L 64–70	9–15 (8–10)	William H. Pitt Center; Fairfield, CT
*Non-conference game. ^{#}Rankings from AP Poll. (#) Tournament seedings in parentheses. All times are in Eastern.
