= 2020–21 St. Francis Brooklyn Terriers men's basketball team =

American college basketball season

2020–21 St. Francis Brooklyn Terriers men's basketball
- Conference: Northeast Conference
- Record: 9–10 (9–9 NEC)
- Head coach: Glenn Braica (11th season)
- Associate head coach: Clive Bentick (2nd season, 14th overall season)
- Assistant coaches: Ron Ganulin (8th season); Jonathan Blount (1st season)
- Home arena: Generoso Pope Athletic Complex

2020–21 Northeast Conference men's basketball standings
	Conf.				Overall
Team	W		L	PCT	W		L	PCT
Wagner	13	–	5	.722	13	–	7	.650
Bryant	10	–	4	.714	15	–	7	.682
Sacred Heart	9	–	7	.563	9	–	9	.500
Mount St. Mary's †	9	–	7	.563	12	–	11	.522
Merrimack*	9	–	9	.500	9	–	9	.500
LIU	9	–	9	.500	9	–	9	.500
St. Francis Brooklyn	9	–	9	.500	9	–	10	.474
Fairleigh Dickinson	8	–	10	.444	9	–	15	.375
Saint Francis (PA)	5	–	13	.278	6	–	16	.273
Central Connecticut	5	–	13	.278	5	–	16	.238
† 2021 NEC tournament winner * ineligible for the 2021 NCAA tournament due to transition period

The 2020–21 St. Francis Brooklyn Terriers men's basketball team represented St. Francis College during the 2020–21 NCAA Division I men's basketball season. The team's head coach was Glenn Braica, who is in his 11th season as the head men's basketball coach. The Terriers play their home games at the Generoso Pope Athletic Complex in Brooklyn Heights, New York as members of the Northeast Conference.

== Previous season ==
The Terriers finished the 2019–20 season 13–18, 7–11 in NEC play to finish in a three-way tie for seventh place. They lost in the quarterfinals of the NEC tournament to Robert Morris.

== Roster ==
2020–21 St. Francis Brooklyn Terriers men's basketball team
Players
Coaches

Pos.	#	Name	Height	Weight	Year	Previous school	Hometown
G	0	Larry Moreno	6 ft 0 in (1.83 m)	176 lb (80 kg)	RS Jr	Brooklyn High School For Law & Technology	Brooklyn, NY
G	1	Stevan Krtinić	6 ft 5 in (1.96 m)	205 lb (93 kg)	Jr	Carnegie Schools Riverside	Novi Sad, Serbia
G	2	Abdallah Wague	6 ft 0 in (1.83 m)	172 lb (78 kg)	So	Benjamin Banneker Academy; VFMAC	Brooklyn, NY
G	3	Rob Higgins	6 ft 1 in (1.85 m)	179 lb (81 kg)	So	Middletown High School North	Middletown, NJ
G	4	Chauncey Hawkins	5 ft 8 in (1.73 m)	172 lb (78 kg)	Sr	Saint Joseph Regional High School	Spring Valley, NY
F	5	Yaradyah Evans	6 ft 6 in (1.98 m)	196 lb (89 kg)	RS Sr	South Shore High School	Brooklyn, NY
F	12	Vuk Stevanic	6 ft 8 in (2.03 m)	228 lb (103 kg)	Jr	Canterbury School; Highland CC	Jagodina, Serbia
G/F	13	Travis Atson	6 ft 5 in (1.96 m)	200 lb (91 kg)	GS	Christ the King High School; Quinnipiac	Brooklyn, NY
G	14	Unique McLean	6 ft 2 in (1.88 m)	182 lb (83 kg)	RS Sr	MacDuffie School; UMass	Brooklyn, New York
G	15	Trey Quartlebaum	6 ft 2 in (1.88 m)	187 lb (85 kg)	So	Lawrence High School	Lawrence, KS
F	20	Elijah Hardison	6 ft 7 in (2.01 m)	225 lb (102 kg)	Fr	Xaverian High School	Brooklyn, NY
F	21	Luka Jaksic	6 ft 6 in (1.98 m)	224 lb (102 kg)	RS So	Furtah Prep; Presbyterian	Woodstock, Georgia
G	30	Alex May (W)	6 ft 1 in (1.85 m)	182 lb (83 kg)	So	Andrews Osborne Academy	Englewood, NJ
G	45	Jordan Williams	6 ft 4 in (1.93 m)	185 lb (84 kg)	Sr	St. Edmund Prep	Brooklyn, NY
F	55	David Muenkat	6 ft 7 in (2.01 m)	221 lb (100 kg)	Jr	The Rise Center; Trinidad State JC	Brampton, Ontario, Canada

Head coach

- Glenn Braica (Queens College '89)

Assistant coach(es)

- Clive Bentick (Canisius '01)
- Ron Ganulin (LIU '68)
- Jonathan Blount (Queens College '16)

Legend

- (C) Team captain
- (S) Suspended
- (I) Ineligible
- (W) Walk-on
- Injured
- Current redshirt

Roster
Last update: December 28, 2020

== Schedule and results ==
Date time, TV	Rank^{#}	Opponent^{#}	Result	Record	High points	High rebounds	High assists	Site (attendance) city, state
Regular Season
December 8, 2020; 7:00 pm, NEC Front Row		Bryant	L 82–101	0–1 (0–1)	19 – Atson	8 – Atson	5 – Higgins	Generoso Pope Athletic Complex; Brooklyn, NY
December 9, 2020; 4:00 pm, NEC Front Row		Bryant	W 93–91	1–1 (1–1)	24 – Higgins	11 – Atson	5 – Atson	Generoso Pope Athletic Complex; Brooklyn, NY
December 15, 2020; 5:00 pm, NEC Front Row		at Central Connecticut	W 91–86	2–1 (2–1)	21 – Atson	8 – Atson	7 – Hawkins	William H. Detrick Gymnasium; New Britain, CT
December 16, 2020; 1:00 pm, NEC Front Row		at Central Connecticut	L 59–78	2–2 (2–2)	10 – Evans	6 – 3 tied	5 – Hawkins	William H. Detrick Gymnasium; New Britain, CT
December 23, 2020*; 2:00 pm, NEC Front Row		Saint Peter's	L 64–70	2–3	17 – Hawkins	12 – Atson	4 – Stevanic	Generoso Pope Athletic Complex; Brooklyn, NY
January 7, 2021; 4:00 pm, NEC Front Row		Mount St. Mary's	W 70–55	3–3 (3–2)	23 – Hawkins	7 – Evans	7 – Hawkins	Generoso Pope Athletic Complex; Brooklyn, NY
January 8, 2021; 4:00 pm, NEC Front Row		Mount St. Mary's	W 67–55	4–3 (4–2)	15 – Tied	14 – McLean	5 – Hawkins	Generoso Pope Athletic Complex; Brooklyn, NY
January 30, 2021; 4:00 pm, ESPN3		LIU; Battle of Brooklyn	L 88–102	4–4 (4–3)	20 – Hawkins	8 – McLean	4 – Tied	Generoso Pope Athletic Complex; Brooklyn, NY
February 4, 2021; 7:00 pm, NEC Front Row		Wagner	L 67–74	4–5 (4–4)	19 – Atson	10 – McLean	5 – McLean	Generoso Pope Athletic Complex; Brooklyn, NY
February 5, 2021; 7:00 pm, NEC Front Row		Wagner	L 81–84 ^{OT}	4–6 (4–5)	21 – Moreno	10 – 2 tied	3 – 2 tied	Generoso Pope Athletic Complex; Brooklyn, NY
February 8, 2021; 7:00 pm, NEC Front Row		at LIU	L 84–96	4–7 (4–6)	24 – Atson	11 – Meunkat	4 – Moreno	Steinberg Wellness Center; Brooklyn, NY
February 11, 2021; 7:00 pm, NEC Front Row		at Saint Francis (PA)	W 70–67	5–7 (5–6)	18 – Atson	6 – Atson	4 – Hawkins	DeGol Arena; Loretto, PA
February 12, 2021; 4:00 pm, NEC Front Row		at Saint Francis (PA)	L 66–80	5–8 (5–7)	12 – Hawkins	6 – 2 tied	3 – Atson	DeGol Arena; Loretto, PA
February 16, 2021; 7:00 pm, NEC Front Row		at Fairleigh Dickinson	W 83–75	6–8 (6–7)	25 – McLean	12 – Evans	6 – 2 tied	Rothman Center; Hackensack, NJ
February 17, 2021; 7:00 pm, NEC Front Row		at Fairleigh Dickinson	W 90–87	7–8 (7–7)	20 – 2 tied	7 – 2 tied	5 – Hawkins	Rothman Center; Hackensack, NJ
February 20, 2020; 4:00 pm, NEC Front Row		Sacred Heart	W 88–76	8–8 (8–7)	22 – Hawkins	9 – 2 tied	4 – 2 tied	Generoso Pope Athletic Complex; Brooklyn, NY
February 21, 2021; 2:00 pm, NEC Front Row		Sacred Heart	L 82–88	8–9 (8–8)	22 – Hawkins	9 – Atson	4 – McLean	Generoso Pope Athletic Complex; Brooklyn, NY
February 25, 2021; 4:00 pm, NEC Front Row		at Merrimack	W 84–71	9–9 (9–8)	19 – Atson	8 – 3 tied	5 – 2 tied	Hammel Court; North Andover, MA
February 26, 2021; 4:00 pm		at Merrimack	L 67–75	9–10 (9–9)	18 – McLean	9 – McLean	2 – 2 tied	Hammel Court; North Andover, MA
*Non-conference game. ^{#}Rankings from AP Poll. (#) Tournament seedings in parentheses. All times are in Eastern Time..
