= 2020–21 Mount St. Mary's Mountaineers men's basketball team =

American college basketball season

2020–21 Mount St. Mary's Mountaineers men's basketball
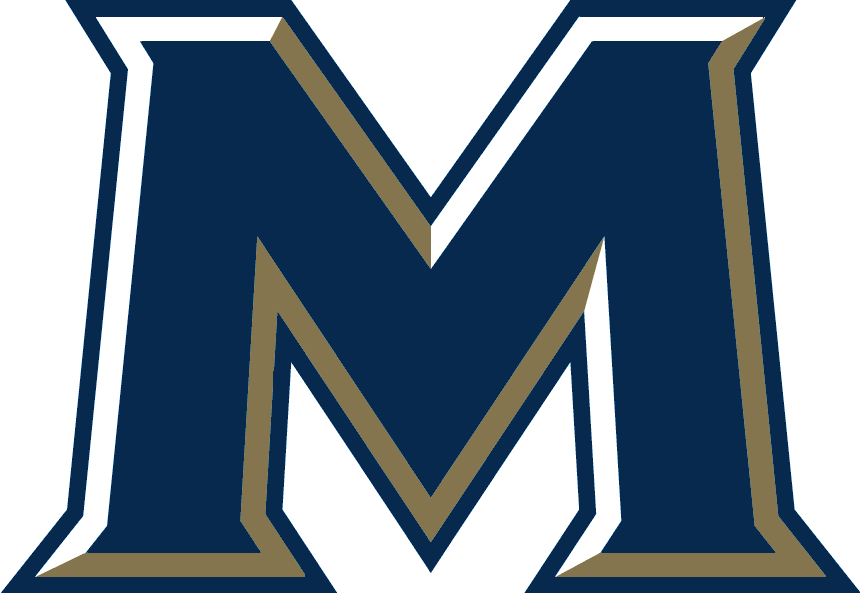

NEC tournament champions

NCAA tournament, First Four
- Conference: Northeast Conference
- Record: 12–11 (9–7 NEC)
- Head coach: Dan Engelstad (3rd season)
- Assistant coaches: Will Holland; Matt Miller; Matt Graves
- Home arena: Knott Arena

2020–21 Northeast Conference men's basketball standings
	Conf.				Overall
Team	W		L	PCT	W		L	PCT
Wagner	13	–	5	.722	13	–	7	.650
Bryant	10	–	4	.714	15	–	7	.682
Sacred Heart	9	–	7	.563	9	–	9	.500
Mount St. Mary's †	9	–	7	.563	12	–	11	.522
Merrimack*	9	–	9	.500	9	–	9	.500
LIU	9	–	9	.500	9	–	9	.500
St. Francis Brooklyn	9	–	9	.500	9	–	10	.474
Fairleigh Dickinson	8	–	10	.444	9	–	15	.375
Saint Francis (PA)	5	–	13	.278	6	–	16	.273
Central Connecticut	5	–	13	.278	5	–	16	.238
† 2021 NEC tournament winner * ineligible for the 2021 NCAA tournament due to transition period

The 2020–21 Mount St. Mary's Mountaineers men's basketball team represented Mount St. Mary's University during the 2020–21 NCAA Division I men's basketball season. The Mountaineers were led by third-year head coach Dan Engelstad, and played their home games at Knott Arena in Emmitsburg, Maryland as members of the Northeast Conference. They finished the season 12-11, 9-7 in NEC Play to finish in 4th place. They defeated Wagner and Bryant to be champions of the NEC tournament. They received the conference's automatic bid to the NCAA tournament where they lost in the First Four to Texas Southern.

== Previous season ==
The Mountaineers finished their previous season 11–21, 7–11 in NEC play to finish in a three-way tie for seventh place. They lost in the quarterfinals of the NEC tournament to Sacred Heart.

== Roster ==
2020–21 Mount St. Mary's Mountaineers men's basketball team
Players
Coaches

Pos.	#	Name	Height	Weight	Year	Previous school	Hometown
G	1	Dakota Leffew	6 ft 5 in (1.96 m)	185 lb (84 kg)	Fr	Jonesboro High SS	Hampton, Georgia
G	3	Naim Miller	6 ft 4 in (1.93 m)	200 lb (91 kg)	So	First Love Christian Academy	Pittsburgh, Pennsylvania
G	4	DeAndre Thomas	6 ft 5 in (1.96 m)	205 lb (93 kg)	Jr	Millwood School	Richmond, Virginia
F	5	Quinton Mincey	6 ft 5 in (1.96 m)	180 lb (82 kg)	Fr	Eleanor Roosevelt HS	Greenbelt, Maryland
G	12	Odri Dedolli	6 ft 3 in (1.91 m)	185 lb (84 kg)	Sr	Montverde Academy	Tirana, Albania
F	13	Mezie Offurum	6 ft 8 in (2.03 m)	230 lb (104 kg)	Jr	Georgetown Prep	Germantown, Virginia
G	15	Damian Chong Qui	5 ft 8 in (1.73 m)	155 lb (70 kg)	Jr	McDonogh School	Baltimore, Maryland
F	21	Chidozie Collin Nnamene	6 ft 9 in (2.06 m)	210 lb (95 kg)	Jr	St. Albans School	Enugu State, Nigeria
F	22	Nana Opoku	6 ft 9 in (2.06 m)	210 lb (95 kg)	RS Jr	Potomac HS	Woodbridge, Virginia
G	23	Josh Reaves	6 ft 4 in (1.93 m)	205 lb (93 kg)	Fr	South Kent School	Hamden, Connecticut
F	24	František Barton	6 ft 7 in (2.01 m)	210 lb (95 kg)	Fr	Get Better Academy	Brno, Czech Republic
F	34	Jalen Jefferson	6 ft 7 in (2.01 m)	200 lb (91 kg)	Jr	Hopewell HS	Hopewell, Virginia
G	35	Winston Moore	6 ft 5 in (1.96 m)	205 lb (93 kg)	Fr	St. John's Prep	Frederick, Maryland
F	42	Malik Jefferson	6 ft 9 in (2.06 m)	230 lb (104 kg)	Jr	Hopewell HS	Hopewell, Virginia

Head coach

- Dan Engelstad (St. Mary's (MD))

Assistant coach(es)

- Will Holland (Mount St. Mary's)
- Matt Miller (St. Mary's (MD))
- Matt Graves (Belmont Abbey)

Legend

- (C) Team captain
- (S) Suspended
- (I) Ineligible
- (W) Walk-on
- Injured
- Current redshirt

Roster
Last update: December 25, 2020

== Schedule and results ==
Date time, TV	Rank^{#}	Opponent^{#}	Result	Record	Site (attendance) city, state
Non-conference regular season
November 25, 2020*; 7:00 pm		at Morgan State	W 62–55	1–0	Talmadge L. Hill Field House (50); Baltimore, MD
November 28, 2020*; 3:00 pm		vs. Navy	L 67–73	1–1	Xfinity Center; College Park, MD
November 29, 2020*; 2:00 pm, BTN		at Maryland	L 61–79	1–2	Xfinity Center; College Park, MD
December 5, 2020*; 2:00 pm, ESPN+		at VCU	L 42–60	1–3	Siegel Center (250); Richmond, VA
December 8, 2020; 7:00 pm		Saint Francis (PA)	W 75–57	2–3 (1–0)	Knott Arena; Emmitsburg, MD
January 7, 2021; 4:00 pm		at St. Francis Brooklyn	L 55–70	2–4 (1–1)	Generoso Pope Athletic Complex; Brooklyn, NY
January 8, 2021; 4:00 pm		at St. Francis Brooklyn	L 55–67	2–5 (1–2)	Generoso Pope Athletic Complex; Brooklyn
January 14, 2021; 7:00 pm		Merrimack	W 77–57	3–5 (2–2)	Knott Arena; Emmitsburg, MD
January 15, 2021; 4:00 pm		Merrimack	W 63–52	4–5 (3–2)	Knott Arena; Emmitsburg, MD
January 21, 2021; 7:00 pm		at Central Connecticut	W 67–57	5–5 (4–2)	William H. Detrick Gymnasium; New Britain, CT
January 22, 2021; 4:00 pm		at Central Connecticut	L 64–65	5–6 (4–3)	William H. Detrick Gymnasium; New Britain, CT
January 30, 2021; 2:00 pm		Sacred Heart	L 58–61	5–7 (4–4)	Knott Arena; Emmitsburg, MD
January 31, 2021; 2:00 pm		Sacred Heart	W 76–64	6–7 (5–4)	Knott Arena; Emmitsburg, MD
February 11, 2021; 7:00 pm		LIU	W 66–60	7–7 (6–4)	Knott Arena; Emmitsburg, MD
February 12, 2021; 4:00 pm		LIU	W 64–46	8–7 (7–4)	Knott Arena; Emmitsburg, MD
February 16, 2021; 7:00 pm		Wagner	L 39–61	8–8 (7–5)	Knott Arena; Emmitsburg, MD
February 17, 2021; 4:00 pm		Wagner	L 55–57	8–9 (7–6)	Knott Arena; Emmitsburg, MD
February 20, 2021; 2:00 pm		at Fairleigh Dickinson	L 71–76	8–10 (7–7)	Rothman Center; Hackensack, NJ
February 21, 2021; 2:00 pm		at Fairleigh Dickinson	W 74–61	9–10 (8–7)	Rothman Center; Hackensack, NJ
February 25, 2021; 7:00 pm		at Saint Francis (PA)	W 72–65	10–10 (9–7)	DeGol Arena; Loretto, PA
March 2, 2021; 7:00 pm		at Bryant	Canceled		Chace Athletic Center; Smithfield, RI
March 3, 2021; 4:00 pm		at Bryant	Canceled		Chace Athletic Center; Smithfield, RI
NEC tournament
March 6, 2021; 2:00 pm, ESPN3	(4)	at (1) Wagner; Semifinals	W 66–60	11–10	Spiro Sports Center; Staten Island, NY
March 9, 2021; 7:00 pm, ESPN2	(4)	at (2) Bryant; Championship	W 73–68	12–10	Chace Athletic Center; Smithfield, RI
NCAA tournament
March 18, 2021*; 5:10 pm, truTV	(16 E)	vs. (16 E) Texas Southern; First Four	L 52–60	12–11	Simon Skjodt Assembly Hall; Bloomington, IN
*Non-conference game. ^{#}Rankings from AP Poll. (#) Tournament seedings in parentheses. All times are in Eastern.
