= Derek Kellogg =

American college basketball coach (born 1973)

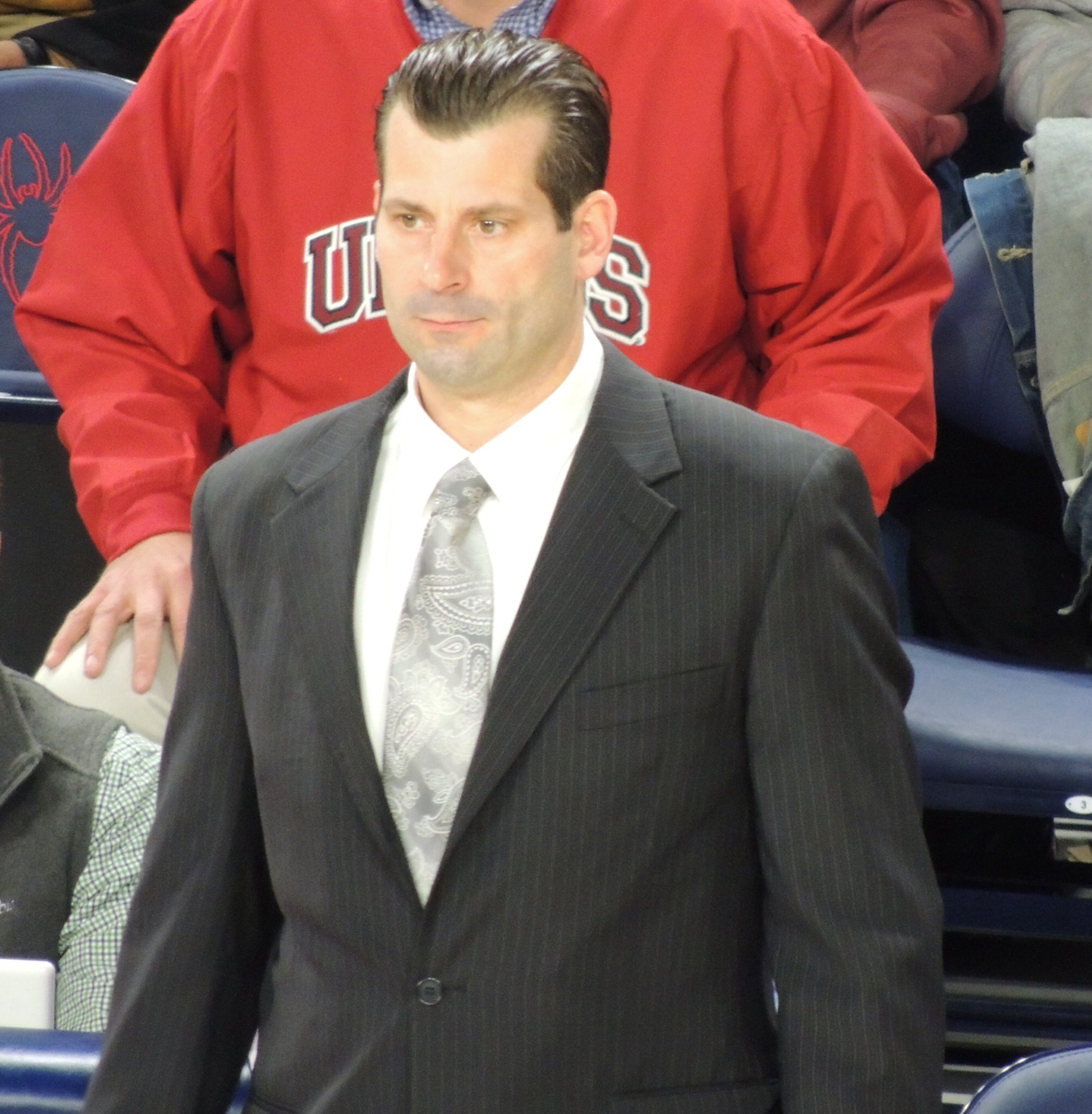
- Kellogg in 2014

Current position
- Title: Assistant coach
- Team: Creighton
- Conference: Big East

Biographical details
- Born: June 20, 1973 (age 53); Springfield, Massachusetts, U.S.

Playing career
- 1991–1995: UMass
- Position: Point guard

Coaching career (HC unless noted)
- 1997–1999: George Mason (assistant)
- 1999–2000: Youngstown State (assistant)
- 2000–2008: Memphis (assistant)
- 2008–2017: UMass
- 2017–2019: LIU Brooklyn
- 2019–2022: LIU
- 2022–2023: UMass (assistant)
- 2023–present: Creighton (assistant)

Head coaching record
- Overall: 229–211 (.520)

Accomplishments and honors

Championships
- NEC tournament (2018)

Derek William Kellogg (born June 20, 1973) is an American college basketball coach who currently serves as an assistant coach for Creighton. Kellogg previously served as head coach of the Massachusetts Minutemen, his alma mater, being named to the position on April 23, 2008, replacing Travis Ford, who left to take the head coaching job at Oklahoma State University. He was removed from the position on March 9, 2017. After being let go by the Minutemen, he was named head coach of the LIU Brooklyn Blackbirds, which represented the school's Brooklyn campus. He was named the first head coach of the current LIU team upon its formation in July 2019 when LIU merged the Brooklyn athletic program with that of its Post campus, creating a new program that now competes as the LIU Sharks, and served in that role until he was fired and replaced by Rod Strickland on June 30, 2022. After his firing from LIU, Kellogg returned to his alma mater UMass as an assistant coach for one season before leaving for Creighton in 2023.

== Early years ==
Kellogg attended Cathedral High School in Springfield, Massachusetts and the University of Massachusetts. He played point guard for the UMass Minutemen from 1991 to 1995 with Marcus Camby, Mike Williams and Lou Roe. Kellogg played on four Atlantic 10 Conference regular season and tournament championship teams. During that span, the Minutemen were just the second team in NCAA history to win four straight outright season and tournament championships. Coached by John Calipari, UMass was 111–24 during Kellogg's career there. He was named captain in both his junior and senior years.

== Playing achievements ==
- Holds the UMass sophomore class record for best free throw percentage (.806) and assists (5.2 per game)*
- Fifth on UMass all-time assist list with 453*
- Seventh on UMass 3-point field goal percentage list (.381)*
- 1994–95 Atlantic 10 Honors: All A-10 Third Team and A-10 Tournament Team
- 3-Time All Atlantic 10 Academic Selection (1992–93 – 1994–95)

(* Records as of UMass 2008–09 season)

== Coaching career ==
Kellogg began his coaching career at George Mason University where he was an assistant for two seasons (1997–99). He then moved to Youngstown State for the 1999–2000 season. From 2000 to 2008, Kellogg was assistant coach of the men's basketball team at the University of Memphis, under John Calipari.

=== UMass ===
In Kellogg's first year as head coach, the UMass Minutemen finished with a 12–18 record. Though disappointing, the season featured wins over three teams that would reach the NCAA tournament: Kansas, Dayton and Temple. UMass also nearly upset Xavier, who also made the NCAA Tournament.

The 2009–10 season for UMass finished with a 12–20 record. Kellogg's squad, with many first-year players for UMass, had notable wins against Memphis and Rhode Island in the regular season's finale, which arguably knocked the Rams off the NCAA tournament bubble. The Minutemen also broke an eight-game losing streak in the Atlantic 10 Tournament, with a first round win over Charlotte. Six of the Minutemen's opponents would go on to the NCAA Tournament, though UMass went 0–7 in games against those teams.

In the 2010–2011 season Kellogg's Minutemen improved to a 15–15 record with a 7–9 regular season conference record in the Atlantic 10. The team started the season 7–0, but faltered down the stretch ending the season 2–8 in their last 10 games. They did have notable wins in the regular season over RPI top 100 teams Rhode Island twice and Dayton. They earned a home Atlantic 10 tournament game at the Mullins Center for the first time since 2003, but this time lost 78–50 to Dayton. After this loss and a previous loss to Fordham, there was talk that Kellogg should be fired after three seasons. However, on March 9, 2011, UMass athletic director John McCutcheon announced that Kellogg would be back for the 2011–2012 season.

In the 2011–12 season, Kellogg's Minutemen won 20 regular season games, then two more by reaching the semifinals of the Atlantic 10 tournament. They defeated the #1-seed Temple in the quarterfinals, but lost to the eventual tournament champion St. Bonaventure. The Minutemen went 15–1 in home games, with the only loss to La Salle by a 72–71 score. The team was selected to participate in the NIT, the school's first postseason appearance since reaching the 2008 NIT Final. With victories at Mississippi State, Seton Hall and Drexel, Kellogg's squad became only the fourth team in NIT history to reach the semifinals by winning three straight road games. By defeating Drexel he notched a win against head coach Bruiser Flint, who as a UMass assistant recruited Kellogg to play for the Minutemen. The Minutemen then lost to Stanford in the NIT Semi-Finals, finishing the season at 25–12.

Under Kellogg, the 2012–13 Minutemen once again enjoyed a 20 win season and for the second straight season reached the semifinals of the Atlantic 10 tournament. They would reach the semifinals by avenging regular season losses to George Washington and Temple before losing to VCU. For the second straight year the Minutemen were invited to play in the NIT. Although seeded second in their region, they would be upset at home by Stony Brook in the first round, finishing the season with a 21–12 record.

The 2013–14 season saw the Minutemen return to the NCAA tournament. The team rushed out to a 16–1 start and a national ranking as high as #12 before fading in the second half of the season and splitting its final 16 games to finish 24–9. Despite the impressive non-conference showing, the Minutemen once again failed to crack the top four of the A10 conference and finished tied for 5th. Receiving a #6 seed in the NCAA tournament, the Minutemen were soundly defeated by 19 points in the second round by the #11 seed Tennessee Volunteers.

The two seasons following the NCAA bid were disappointing for UMass as the team finished with 17–15 and 14–18 records, respectively. The 2014–15 squad dropped six of their final seven games and missed out on the postseason. The 2015–2016 season featured a seven-game losing streak marked by double digit losses and second half collapses. Overall attendance at Mullins dropped to less than 50% capacity for the season.

Despite a talented top 25 recruiting class and key returning players, Kellogg's program struggled again in 2016–17. After starting with a 10–3 non-conference record against a relatively weak schedule, the Minutemen stumbled to a 15–18 finish, including a 4–14 conference record and a 12th-place finish in conference play. Over his 9 years as head coach at UMass, Coach Kellogg's A10 conference record was 67–83 with his best season a T-5th finish.

Kellogg was fired by UMass on March 9, 2017.

=== LIU Brooklyn ===
On April 18, 2017 Kellogg was hired at LIU Brooklyn, replacing Jack Perri to become the 14th head coach in Blackbirds history. In his first season, he led the Blackbirds to a victory in the NEC Tournament finals, sealing a trip to the NCAA First Four of the NCAA Tournament.

=== LIU ===
Kellogg was named head coach of the unified LIU men's basketball team in 2019. On February 8, 2020, Kellogg picked up his 200th coaching win.

=== Return to UMass ===
On August 17, 2022, UMass Men’s Basketball announced Kellogg’s return to Amherst to serve as an assistant coach under Frank Martin.

=== Creighton ===
On April 27, 2023, Creighton men’s Basketball announced Kellogg had been named as an assistant coach under head coach Greg McDermott.

== Head coaching record ==
Record table
| Season | Team | Overall | Conference | Standing | Postseason |
|---|---|---|---|---|---|
UMass Minutemen (Atlantic 10 Conference) (2008–2017)
| 2008–09 | UMass | 12–18 | 7–9 | 10th | |
| 2009–10 | UMass | 12–20 | 5–11 | 11th | |
| 2010–11 | UMass | 15–15 | 7–9 | 8th | |
| 2011–12 | UMass | 25–12 | 9–7 | T–5th | NIT Semifinal |
| 2012–13 | UMass | 21–12 | 9–7 | T–6th | NIT First Round |
| 2013–14 | UMass | 24–9 | 10–6 | T–5th | NCAA Division I Round of 64 |
| 2014–15 | UMass | 17–15 | 10–8 | T–7th | |
| 2015–16 | UMass | 14–18 | 6–12 | T–10th | |
| 2016–17 | UMass | 15–18 | 4–14 | 12th | |
| UMass: | | 155–137 (.531) | 67–83 (.447) | | |
LIU Brooklyn Blackbirds / LIU Sharks (Northeast Conference) (2017–2022)
| 2017–18 | LIU Brooklyn | 18–17 | 10–8 | T–4th | NCAA Division I First Four |
| 2018–19 | LIU Brooklyn | 16–16 | 9–9 | T–5th | |
| 2019–20 | LIU | 15–18 | 9–9 | T–5th | |
| 2020–21 | LIU | 9–9 | 9–9 | 6th | |
| 2021–22 | LIU | 16–14 | 12–6 | 3rd | |
| LIU Brooklyn/LIU: | | 74–74 (.500) | 49–41 (.544) | | |
| Total: | | 229–211 (.520) | | | |
National champion Postseason invitational champion Conference regular season champion Conference regular season and conference tournament champion Division regular season champion Division regular season and conference tournament champion Conference tournament champion
