= Dan Engelstad =

American basketball player and coach (born 1984)

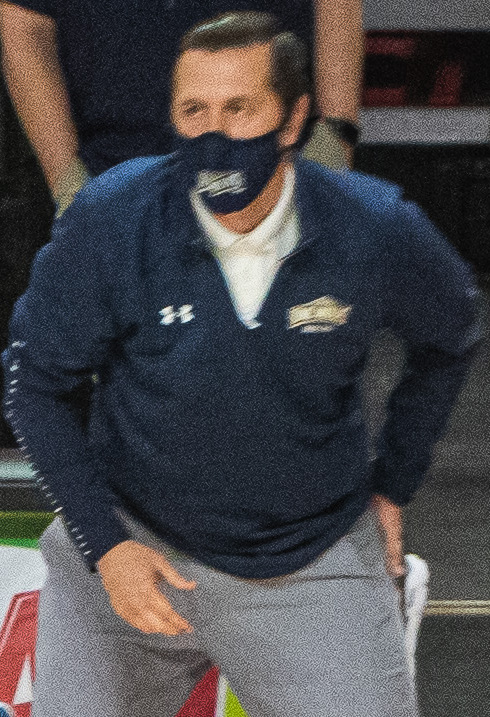
- Engelstad in 2020

Current position
- Title: Associate Head Coach
- Team: Pepperdine

Biographical details
- Born: October 11, 1984 (age 42); Bethesda, Maryland, U.S.

Playing career
- 2003–2007: St. Mary's (MD)

Coaching career (HC unless noted)
- 2007–2010: Mount St. Mary's (assistant)
- 2010–2013: Holy Cross (assistant)
- 2013–2018: Southern Vermont
- 2018–2024: Mount St. Mary's
- 2024–2026: Syracuse (assistant)
- 2026–present: Pepperdine (assistant)

Head coaching record
- Overall: 176–143 (.552)
- Tournaments: 0–1 (NCAA Division I); 0–2 (NCAA Division III)

Accomplishments and honors

Championships
- 4× NECC regular season champion (2015–2018); 2× NECC tournament champion (2016, 2018); NEC tournament champion (2021)

Daniel Engelstad (born October 11, 1984) is an American college basketball coach. Prior to that, he was the head coach of the Mount St. Mary's Mountaineers men's basketball team.

== Playing career ==
Engelstad played college basketball at Division III St. Mary's College of Maryland, where he graduated as the school's all-time leader in assists.

== Coaching career ==
Upon graduation, Engelstad joined Milan Brown's staff at Mount St. Mary's where he was on staff for the Mountaineers' 2008 NCAA tournament team. He followed Brown as an assistant coach at Holy Cross in 2010, where he stayed until 2013 when he accepted the head coaching position at Southern Vermont.

Inheriting a program that was 1–24 before he took over, Engelstad led the Mountaineers to a 16–10 overall record, including wins over a nationally ranked Williams featuring Duncan Robinson. The following season, Engelstad guided Southern Vermont to a NECC regular season title, its best record in program history with a 25–4 record, and its first-ever appearance in the ECAC Division III New England Basketball tournament, capturing the school's first ECAC title of any kind.

The following season, Southern Vermont won both the NECC regular season and tournament title with a perfect 16–0 mark in conference play, and a 24–4 overall record en route to the school's second-ever NCAA Tournament appearance. Following a 17–10 overall record in the 2016–17 season and another NECC regular season title, Engelstad coached the Mountaineers to its fourth-straight NECC regular season title, its second conference tournament title and an appearance in the 2018 NCAA Division III tournament. With a 104–34 overall record in five seasons, Engelstad is the all-time wins leader in Southern Vermont basketball history.

Engelstad also served as the head coach for Armored Athlete in The Basketball Tournament 2017, helping the team reach the West Regional Final.

On May 9, 2018, Engelstad was named the 22nd head coach in Mount St. Mary's history, replacing Jamion Christian who left for the head coaching job at Siena.

On April 10, 2024, Engelstad officially resigned from his post as Mount St. Mary's head coach to join Adrian Autry's staff at Syracuse. After Autry's dismissal at Syracuse, Engelstad joined the coaching staff at Pepperdine.

== Head coaching record ==
=== NCAA DIII ===
Record table
Season	Team	Overall	Conference	Standing	Postseason
Southern Vermont (NECC) (2013–2018)
2013–14	Southern Vermont	16–10	10–6	4th	
2014–15	Southern Vermont	25–4	16–0	1st	ECAC Div. III New England Champions
2015–16	Southern Vermont	24–4	16–0	1st	NCAA Division III First Round
2016–17	Southern Vermont	17–10	14–2	1st	
2017–18	Southern Vermont	22–6	12–2	1st	NCAA Division III First Round
Southern Vermont:		104–34 (.754)	66–10 (.868)		
Total:		104–34 (.754)			
National champion Postseason invitational champion Conference regular season champion Conference regular season and conference tournament champion Division regular season champion Division regular season and conference tournament champion Conference tournament champion

=== NCAA DI ===
Record table
Season	Team	Overall	Conference	Standing	Postseason
Mount St. Mary's Mountaineers (NEC) (2018–2022)
2018–19	Mount St. Mary's	9–22	6–12	9th	
2019–20	Mount St. Mary's	11–21	7–11	T–7th	
2020–21	Mount St. Mary's	12–11	9–7	3rd	NCAA Division I First Four
2021–22	Mount St. Mary's	14–16	9–9	5th	
Mount St. Mary's Mountaineers (MAAC) (2022–2024)
2022–23	Mount St. Mary's	13–20	8–12	T–8th	
2023–24	Mount St. Mary's	13–19	9–11	8th	
Mount St. Mary's:		72–109 (.398)	48–62 (.436)		
Total:		72–109 (.398)			
National champion Postseason invitational champion Conference regular season champion Conference regular season and conference tournament champion Division regular season champion Division regular season and conference tournament champion Conference tournament champion
