= Anthony Latina =

American basketball player and coach

Current position
- Title: Head coach
- Team: Sacred Heart
- Conference: MAAC
- Record: 172–232 (.426)

Biographical details
- Born: December 13, 1973 (age 52)

Playing career
- 1991–1995: Brandeis
- Position: Point guard

Coaching career (HC unless noted)
- 1995–1999: UMass Lowell (asst.)
- 1999–2005: Central Connecticut (asst.)
- 2005–2013: Sacred Heart (asst.)
- 2013–present: Sacred Heart

Head coaching record
- Overall: 172–232 (.426)

Anthony Latina (born December 13, 1973) has been the men's basketball head coach at Sacred Heart University since 2013.

== Sacred Heart ==
Latina is just the third head coach in Sacred Heart University men's basketball program history, succeeding Dave Bike who retired after 35 seasons at the helm. Latina was Bike's assistant coach for 8 seasons.

== Head coaching record ==
Record table
| Season | Team | Overall | Conference | Standing | Postseason |
|---|---|---|---|---|---|
Sacred Heart Pioneers (Northeast Conference) (2013–2024)
| 2013–14 | Sacred Heart | 5–26 | 2–14 | 10th | |
| 2014–15 | Sacred Heart | 15–17 | 9–9 | T–5th | |
| 2015–16 | Sacred Heart | 12–18 | 11–7 | T–2nd | |
| 2016–17 | Sacred Heart | 13–19 | 8–10 | 8th | |
| 2017–18 | Sacred Heart | 10–21 | 5–13 | 9th | |
| 2018–19 | Sacred Heart | 15–17 | 11–7 | T–3rd | |
| 2019–20 | Sacred Heart | 20–13 | 12–6 | 4th | |
| 2020–21 | Sacred Heart | 9–9 | 9–7 | T–3rd | |
| 2021–22 | Sacred Heart | 10–20 | 6–10 | 7th | |
| 2022–23 | Sacred Heart | 16–17 | 8–8 | 5th | |
| 2023–24 | Sacred Heart | 16–16 | 10–6 | 3rd | |
Sacred Heart Pioneers (MAAC) (2024–2026)
| 2024–25 | Sacred Heart | 15–18 | 10–10 | 7th | |
| 2025–26 | Sacred Heart | 14–19 | 9–11 | 9th | |
Sacred Heart Pioneers (Metro Conference) (2026–present)
| 2026–27 | Sacred Heart | 2–2 | 0–0 | | |
| Sacred Heart: | | 172–232 (.426) | 109–118 (.480) | | |
| Total: | | 172–232 (.426) | | | |
National champion Postseason invitational champion Conference regular season champion Conference regular season and conference tournament champion Division regular season champion Division regular season and conference tournament champion Conference tournament champion
