= 2021 College Basketball Invitational =

College basketball tournament

- Teams: 8
- Finals site: Ocean Center, Daytona Beach, Florida
- Champions: Pepperdine Waves (1st title)
- Runner-up: Coastal Carolina Chanticleers (2nd title game)
- Semifinalists: Bellarmine Knights (1st semifinal); Stetson Hatters (1st semifinal)
- Winning coach: Lorenzo Romar (1st title)
- MVP: Kessler Edwards (Pepperdine)
- Attendance: 1,358 (1 game not reported)

The 2021 College Basketball Invitational (CBI) was a single-elimination men's college basketball tournament consisting of eight National Collegiate Athletic Association (NCAA) Division I teams that did not participate in the 2021 NCAA Division I men's basketball tournament or the NIT. It was held from March 22 to 24. This event marked the 13th year the tournament has been held, after the 2020 edition was cancelled due to the COVID-19 pandemic. In February 2021, the CBI was reported to be exploring holding its annual postseason tournament in a neutral site format rather than on campus. Subsequently, the site was announced as being the Ocean Center in Daytona Beach, Florida. Pepperdine won the tournament.

== Participating teams ==
The 2021 bracket was unveiled on March 15. For the 2021 event the championship game was a single game instead of a three game series.

Team	Conference	Overall record	Conference record	Appearances	Last bid
Army	Patriot	12–9	7–7	1st	Never
Bellarmine	A-Sun	13–7	10–3	1st	Never
Bowling Green	MAC	14–11	10–8	1st	Never
Bryant	NEC	15–6	10–4	2nd	2013
Coastal Carolina	Sun Belt	16–7	9–5	3rd	2019
Longwood	Big South	12–16	10–10	2nd	2019
Pepperdine	West Coast	12–12	7–6	3rd	2016
Stetson	A-Sun	11–14	7–9	1st	Never

=== Declined invitations ===
- Marshall
- UTSA
- Washington State

== Schedule ==
Date	Time*	Matchup	Television	Score	Attendance
Quarterfinals
March 22	11:30 am	**Stetson** vs. Bowling Green	FloSports	53–52	101
March 22	2:30 pm	**Coastal Carolina** vs. Bryant	FloSports	93–82	75
March 22	5:30 pm	Longwood vs. **Pepperdine**	FloSports	66–80	102
March 22	8:30 pm	**Bellarmine** vs. Army	FloSports	77–67	601
Semifinals
March 23	5:30 pm	Stetson vs. **Coastal Carolina**	FloSports	72–77^{OT}	
March 23	8:00 pm	**Pepperdine** vs. Bellarmine	FloSports	82–71	286
Championship
March 24	8:00 pm	Coastal Carolina vs. **Pepperdine**	FloSports	61–84	193
*All times are listed as Eastern Daylight Time (UTC-4). Winning team in **bold**.

== Bracket ==
Quarterfinals; March 22
**Stetson**	**53**
Bowling Green	52
**Coastal Carolina**	**93**
Bryant	82
Longwood	66
**Pepperdine**	**80**
**Bellarmine**	**77**
Army	67

Semifinals; March 23
Stetson	72
**Coastal Carolina**	**77***
**Pepperdine**	**82**
Bellarmine	71

Championship; March 24
Coastal Carolina	61
**Pepperdine**	**84**

* Denotes overtime period.
