= 2022–23 Hartford Hawks men's basketball team =

American college basketball season

2022–23 Hartford Hawks men's basketball
- Conference: Independent
- Record: 5–23
- Head coach: Tom Devitt (interim)
- Assistant coaches: Jeff Rafferty (1st season); Paul Harris (1st season)
- Home arena: Chase Arena

2022–23 NCAA Division I men's basketball independents standings
	Conf.				Overall
Team	W		L	PCT	W		L	PCT
Chicago State		–		–	11	–	20	.355
Hartford		–		–	5	–	23	.179

The 2022–23 Hartford Hawks men's basketball team represented the University of Hartford in the 2022–23 NCAA Division I men's basketball season. The Hawks, led by interim head coach Tom Devitt, played their home games at Chase Arena in West Hartford, Connecticut and competed as an independent. They finished the season 5–23.

Hawks head coach John Gallagher resigned one night before the season's first game. This season marked the Hawks' final year as a Division I team as they transitioned to the Division III Commonwealth Coast Conference, now known as the Conference of New England, in July 2023.

== Previous season ==
The Hawks finished the 2021–22 season 12–20, 9–9 in America East play, to finish in a tie for fifth place. As the No. 4 seed in the America East tournament, they defeated Albany before losing to UMBC in the semifinals. This was their last season as a member of the America East Conference.

== Roster ==
2022–23 Hartford Hawks men's basketball team
Players
Coaches

Pos.	#	Name	Height	Weight	Year	Hometown
G/F	0	Matt Hobbs	6 ft 4 in (1.93 m)	200 lb (91 kg)	GS	Anchorage, AK
F	1	Jared Kimbrough	6 ft 8 in (2.03 m)	230 lb (104 kg)	GS	Neptune, NJ
G	2	Lorenzo Washington	6 ft 0 in (1.83 m)	170 lb (77 kg)	Fr	Middletown, NY
G	3	Kurtis Henderson	5 ft 10 in (1.78 m)	180 lb (82 kg)	So	Brockton, MA
G	5	Davon Ellison	6 ft 4 in (1.93 m)	180 lb (82 kg)	Fr	Waterbury, CT
G	11	Briggs McClain	6 ft 4 in (1.93 m)	175 lb (79 kg)	Jr	Martinsburg, WV
F	12	Macahi Nelson	6 ft 5 in (1.96 m)	185 lb (84 kg)	Fr	Hagerstown, MD
G	13	Braxton Jones	6 ft 0 in (1.83 m)	170 lb (77 kg)	Fr	Monroe, NJ
G	14	Isiah Middleton	6 ft 5 in (1.96 m)	200 lb (91 kg)	Fr	Coral Gables, FL
F	15	Thomas Webley	6 ft 10 in (2.08 m)	240 lb (109 kg)	Jr	Christchurch, New Zealand
G	21	Carlos Edmundo	6 ft 2 in (1.88 m)	180 lb (82 kg)	Jr	Piscataway, NJ
G	22	Henry White	6 ft 0 in (1.83 m)	165 lb (75 kg)	Fr	Simsbury, CT
G	23	Michael Dunne	6 ft 4 in (1.93 m)	190 lb (86 kg)	GS	Matawan, NJ
F	24	Pano Pavlidis	6 ft 8 in (2.03 m)	200 lb (91 kg)	GS	College Point, NY
G	25	Isaiah Rice	6 ft 0 in (1.83 m)	180 lb (82 kg)	Jr	Media, PA
C	45	Pierre Sow	7 ft 0 in (2.13 m)	235 lb (107 kg)	Sr	Teaneck, NJ

Head coach

- Tom Devitt (interim; Boston College)

Assistant coach(es)

- Jeff Rafferty (Springfield)
- Paul Harris (Syracuse)

Legend

- (C) Team captain
- (S) Suspended
- (I) Ineligible
- (W) Walk-on
- Injured
- Current redshirt

Roster
Last update: December 17, 2022

== Schedule and results ==
Date time, TV	Rank^{#}	Opponent^{#}	Result	Record	Site (attendance) city, state
Regular season
November 8, 2022*; 7:00 p.m.		Sacred Heart	L 70–77	0–1	Chase Arena (840); West Hartford, CT
November 10, 2022*; 7:00 p.m.		NVU–Lyndon	W 85–43	1–1	Chase Arena (410); West Hartford, CT
November 12, 2022*; 7:00 p.m.		at Saint Francis (PA)	L 53–77	1–2	DeGol Arena (787); Loretto, PA
November 17, 2022*; 7:00 p.m.		at Boston University	L 66–102	1–3	Case Gym (850); Boston, MA
November 19, 2022*; 2:00 p.m.		Houghton	W 98–32	2–3	Chase Arena (147); West Hartford, CT
November 22, 2022*; 6:00 p.m.		FDU–Florham	W 82–45	3–3	Chase Arena (100); West Hartford, CT
November 25, 2022*; 4:30 p.m., ESPN+		at Penn; Cathedral Classic	L 55–75	3–4	The Palestra (1,491); Philadelphia, PA
November 26, 2022*; 2:00 p.m.		vs. Delaware; Cathedral Classic	L 50–78	3–5	The Palestra; Philadelphia, PA
November 27, 2022*; 2:00 p.m.		vs. Colgate; Cathedral Classic	L 58–92	3–6	The Palestra; Philadelphia, PA
November 30, 2022*; 7:00 p.m.		Fairleigh Dickinson	W 74–66	4–6	Chase Arena (288); West Hartford, CT
December 4, 2022*; 2:00 p.m.		Brown	L 51–65	4–7	Chase Arena (319); West Hartford, CT
December 6, 2022*; 7:00 p.m.		at St. Francis Brooklyn	L 50–68	4–8	Pratt ARC (100); Brooklyn, NY
December 13, 2022*; 7:00 p.m.		Saint Peter's	L 57–58	4–9	Chase Arena (200); West Hartford, CT
December 17, 2022*; 4:00 p.m.		St. Francis Brooklyn	L 51–67	4–10	Chase Arena (218); West Hartford, CT
December 22, 2022*; 9:00 p.m.		at San Francisco	L 53–85	4–11	War Memorial Gymnasium (1,833); San Francisco, CA
December 30, 2022*; 6:00 p.m.		Morgan State	L 54–61	4–12	Chase Arena (236); West Hartford, CT
January 7, 2023*; 2:00 p.m.		at Sacred Heart	L 71–78	4–13	William H. Pitt Center (457); Fairfield, CT
January 10, 2023*; 7:00 p.m.		at St. Francis Brooklyn	L 73–78	4–14	Pratt ARC (74); Brooklyn, NY
January 16, 2023*; 5:00 p.m.		at UMBC	L 62–87	4–15	Chesapeake Employers Insurance Arena (1,585); Catonsville, MD
January 18, 2023*; 7:00 p.m.		at Morgan State	L 84–92	4–16	Talmadge L. Hill Field House (1,125); Baltimore, MD
January 23, 2023*; 7:00 p.m.		Penn	L 52–76	4–17	Chase Arena (384); West Hartford, CT
January 25, 2023*; 7:00 p.m.		Stonehill	W 73–56	5–17	Chase Arena (328); West Hartford, CT
February 4, 2023*; 2:00 p.m.		Chicago State	L 49–62	5–18	Chase Arena (389); West Hartford, CT
February 6, 2023*; 6:00 p.m.		UMass Lowell	L 48–70	5–19	Chase Arena (279); West Hartford, CT
February 8, 2023*; 7:00 p.m.		Central Connecticut; Rivalry	L 73–82	5–20	Chase Arena (548); West Hartford, CT
February 13, 2023*; 8:00 p.m.		at South Alabama	L 53–77	5–21	Mitchell Center (1,404); Mobile, AL
February 16, 2023*; 7:00 p.m.		Merrimack	L 59-67	5-22	Chase Arena (521); West Hartford, CT
February 19, 2023*; 2:00 p.m.		at Chicago State	L 53–75	5–23	Jones Convocation Center; Chicago, IL
*Non-conference game. ^{#}Rankings from AP poll. (#) Tournament seedings in parentheses. All times are in Eastern.
