= 2021–22 America East Conference men's basketball season =

2021-22 America East Conference men's basketball season
- League: NCAA Division I
- Sport: Basketball
- Teams: 10

2021–22 NCAA Division I men's basketball season
- Season champions: Vermont Catamounts

America East Conference tournament
- Champions: Vermont Catamounts
- Runners-up: UMBC Retrievers

Seasons
- ← 2020-21 2022-23 →

2021–22 America East Conference men's basketball standings
	Conf.				Overall
Team	W		L	PCT	W		L	PCT
Vermont †	17	–	1	.944	28	–	6	.824
UMBC	11	–	7	.611	18	–	14	.563
Stony Brook*	10	–	8	.556	18	–	13	.581
New Hampshire	10	–	8	.556	15	–	13	.536
Hartford	9	–	9	.500	12	–	20	.375
Albany	9	–	9	.500	13	–	18	.419
Binghamton	8	–	10	.444	12	–	17	.414
UMass Lowell	7	–	11	.389	15	–	16	.484
NJIT	6	–	12	.333	11	–	18	.379
Maine	3	–	15	.167	6	–	23	.207
† 2022 AmEast tournament winner *Ineligible for the 2022 AmEast tournament due to changing conferences in 2022

The 2021–22 America East Conference men's basketball season started non-conference play on November 9, 2021, and began conference play on January 2, 2022. The regular season ended on March 1, 2022, followed by the 2022 America East men's basketball tournament held March 6–12, 2022. The Vermont Catamounts finished atop conference standings and also won the conference tournament.

== Conference Schedule ==
Each team is scheduled to play 18 conference games. Each team will play every team twice, once at home and once on the road.

== Head coaches ==
=== Coach Changes ===
Albany hired Dwayne Killings after Will Brown left to become head coach and general manager of the Albany Patroons.

Binghamton named Levell Sanders interim head coach after Tommy Dempsey's contract was not renewed.

UMBC hired Jim Ferry after Ryan Odom left to become the head coach at Utah State.

=== Coaches ===
Team	Head coach	Previous Job	Years At School	Record at School	America East Record	America East Titles	NCAA Tournaments
Albany	Dwayne Killings	Marquette (Assistant)	1	0-0	0-0	0	0
Binghamton	Levell Sanders*	Binghamton(Assistant)	1	0-0	0-0	0	0
Hartford	John Gallagher	Penn (Assistant)	12	157-187	87-87	1	1
Maine	Richard Barron	Maine (Women's HC)	4	16-55	10-30	0	0
UMBC	Jim Ferry	Penn State (Interim HC)	1	0-0	0-0	0	0
UMass Lowell	Pat Duquette	Northeastern (Assistant)	9	95-139	60-77	0	0
New Hampshire	Bill Herrion	East Carolina	17	197-275	114-148	0	0
NJIT	Brian Kennedy	NJIT (Assistant)	6	63-82	6-10	0	0
Stony Brook	Geno Ford	Stony Brook (Interim HC)	4	29-28	17-15	0	0
Vermont	John Becker	Vermont (Assistant)	11	229-96	131-27	3	3

Notes:

- Year at school includes 2021–22 season.
- Overall and America East records are from the time at current school and are through the end of the 2020–21 season.
- NCAA Tournament appearances are from the time at current school only.

*Interim Head Coach for 2021-22 Season

== Preseason Awards ==
The Preseason America East Conference men's basketball polls was released on October 21, 2021.

=== Preseason men's basketball poll ===
First Place Votes in Parentheses

1. Stony Brook (5) - 77
2. Vermont (4) - 71
3. New Hampshire (1) - 64
4. Hartford - 56
5. UMBC - 49
6. UMass Lowell - 43
7. Albany - 34
8. NJIT - 23
9. Maine - 16
10. Binghamton - 14

=== Preseason Honors ===
Honor	Recipient
Preseason All-America East Conference Team	Ryan Davis, Vermont
Preseason All-America East Conference Team	Nick Guadarrama, New Hampshire
Preseason All-America East Conference Team	Jayden Martinez, New Hampshire
Preseason All-America East Conference Team	Elijah Olaniyi, Stony Brook
Preseason All-America East Conference Team	Ben Shungu, Vermont
Preseason All-America East Conference Team	Austin Williams, Hartford

== Regular season ==
=== Conference standings ===
		Conference		Overall		
Rank	Team	Record	Percent	Record	Percent	Tiebreaker
1	Vermont	17-1	.944	28-5	.848	
2	UMBC	11-7	.611	18-14	.563	
3	Stony Brook	10-8	.556	18-13	.581	
4	New Hampshire	10-8	.556	15-13	.536	
5	Albany	9-9	.500	13-18	.419	
6	Hartford	9-9	.500	12-20	.375	
7	Binghamton	8-10	.444	12-17	.414	
8	UMass Lowell	7-11	.389	15-16	.484	
9	NJIT	6-12	.333	11-18	.379	
10	Maine	3-15	.167	6-23	.207	

=== Conference Matrix ===
	Albany	Binghamton	Hartford	Maine	UMBC	UMass Lowell	New Hampshire	NJIT	Stony Brook	Vermont
vs. Albany	–	1-1	1-1	1-1	1-1	0-2	1-1	0-2	2-0	1-0
vs. Binghamton	1-1	–	1-1	0-2	2-0	0-2	2-0	1-1	1-1	0-2
vs. Hartford			–				0-1			1-0
vs. Maine		1-0		–	1-0	1-0		1-0	1-0	
vs. UMBC	1-0			0-1	–	1-0		0-1	1-0	1-0
vs. UMass Lowell	1-0	1-0		0-1	0-1	–	1-0	1-0		
vs. New Hampshire	0-1		1-0			0-1	–			1-0
vs. NJIT	1-0	1-1		0-1	1-0	0-1		–		1-0
vs. Stony Brook	0-1	0-1		0-1	0-1				–	1-0
vs. Vermont			0-1		0-1		0-1	0-1	0-1	–

=== Players of the Week ===
Week	Player(s) of the Week	School	Rookie of the Week	School
Nov. 15	Ben Shungu	Vermont	Byron Ireland	Maine
Nov. 22	Ryan Davis	Vermont (2)	Justin Neely	Albany
Nov. 29	Jayden Martinez	New Hampshire	Sam Ihekwoaba	Maine (2)
Dec. 6	Dylan O’Hearn	NJIT	Justin Neely (2)	Albany (2)
Dec. 13	Jahlil Jenkins	Stony Brook	Justin Neely (3)	Albany (3)
Dec. 20	Jahlil Jenkins (2)	Stony Brook (2)	Novak Perovic	Maine (3)
Dec. 27	Hunter Marks	Hartford	Justin Neely (4)	Albany (4)
Jan. 3	Miles Coleman	NJIT (2)	Sam Ihekwoaba (2)	Maine (4)
Jan. 10	Miles Coleman (2); Ben Shungu (2)	NJIT (3); Vermont (3)	Sam Ihekwoaba (3)	Maine (5)
Jan. 17	Finn Sullivan	Vermont (4)	Sam Ihekwoaba (4)	Maine (6)
Jan. 24	Anthony Roberts	Stony Brook (3)	Kristians Feierbergs	Maine (7)
Jan. 31	Keondre Kennedy	UMBC	Justin Neely (5)	Albany (5)
Feb. 7	Jacob Falko	Binghamton	Keeshawn Mason	NJIT
Feb. 14	Anthony Roberts (2)	Stony Brook (4)	Justin Neely (6)	Albany (6)
Feb. 21	Austin Williams	Hartford (2)	Sam Ihekwoaba (5)	Maine (8)
Feb. 28	Keondre Kennedy (2)	UMBC (2)	Kristians Feierbergs (2)	Maine (9)

=== Records against other conferences ===
Power 7 Conferences	Record	Power 7 Conferences	Record
ACC	2-1	American	None
Big East	0-6	Big Ten	0-4
Big 12	0-3	Pac-12	0-1
SEC	0-2	Power 7 Total	2-17
Other Division I Conferences	Record	Other Division I Conferences	Record
Atlantic 10	2-6	ASUN	0-1
Big Sky	None	Big South	1-2
Big West	None	Colonial	1-2
Conference USA	None	Horizon League	0-1
Ivy League	6-7	MAAC	2-4
MAC	None	MEAC	None
MVC	2-1	MWC	0-1
NEC	12-9	OVC	1-0
Patriot League	7-5	SoCon	0-3
Southland	None	SWAC	None
Summit League	None	Sun Belt	1-1
WAC	None	WCC	None
Other Division I Total			35-43
NCAA Division I Total			37-60
NCAA Division III Total			11-0
NAIA Total			1-0
USCAA Total			2-0
Total Non-Conference Record			51-60

== Conference tournament ==
The top 8 teams from the America East qualify for the conference tournament. The higher seed hosts each game.

Quarterfinals; Sunday, March 6, 2022; ESPN+
1	Vermont	98
8	NJIT	59
4	Hartford	61
5	Albany	49
(Pairings are reseeded after the first round)
3	New Hampshire	69
6	Binghamton	72
2	UMBC	93*
7	UMass Lowell	85

Semifinals; Wednesday March 9, 2022; ESPN+
1	Vermont	74
6	Binghamton	42
2	UMBC	80
4	Hartford	60

Championship; Saturday, March 12, 2022; ESPN2
1	Vermont	82
2	UMBC	43
