= 2021–22 Binghamton Bearcats men's basketball team =

American college basketball season

2021–22 Binghamton Bearcats men's basketball
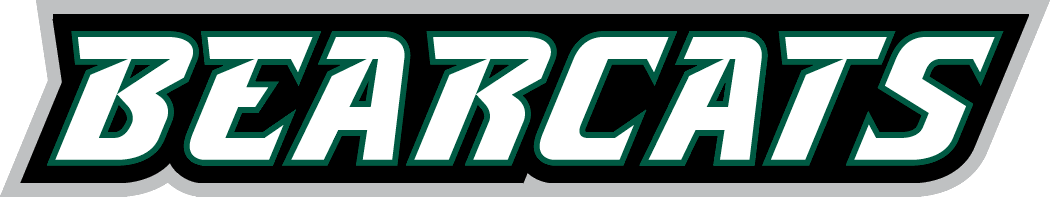
- Conference: America East Conference
- Record: 12–17 (8–10 America East)
- Head coach: Levell Sanders (1st season)
- Assistant coaches: Brian Johnson; Marlon Guild; Patrick Norris
- Home arena: Binghamton University Events Center

2021–22 America East Conference men's basketball standings
	Conf.				Overall
Team	W		L	PCT	W		L	PCT
Vermont †	17	–	1	.944	28	–	6	.824
UMBC	11	–	7	.611	18	–	14	.563
Stony Brook*	10	–	8	.556	18	–	13	.581
New Hampshire	10	–	8	.556	15	–	13	.536
Hartford	9	–	9	.500	12	–	20	.375
Albany	9	–	9	.500	13	–	18	.419
Binghamton	8	–	10	.444	12	–	17	.414
UMass Lowell	7	–	11	.389	15	–	16	.484
NJIT	6	–	12	.333	11	–	18	.379
Maine	3	–	15	.167	6	–	23	.207
† 2022 AmEast tournament winner *Ineligible for the 2022 AmEast tournament due to changing conferences in 2022

The 2021–22 Binghamton Bearcats men's basketball team represented Binghamton University in the 2021–22 NCAA Division I men's basketball season. They played their home games at the Binghamton University Events Center in Vestal, New York and were led by first-year head coach Levell Sanders. They finished the season 12–17, 8–10 in America East play, to finish in sixth place. They defeated New Hampshire in the quarterfinals of the America East tournament before losing in the semifinals to Vermont.

== Previous season ==
In a season limited due to the ongoing COVID-19 pandemic, the Bearcats finished the 2020–21 season 4–14, 4–10 in America East play, to finish in ninth place. As the ninth seed in the America East tournament, they lost to fourth-seeded Hartford 60–77 in the first round.

On March 1, 2021, the school announced that head coach Tommy Dempsey's contract would not be renewed, and named assistant coach Levell Sanders as the interim head coach for the season, while the school will look for a permanent replacement.

== Roster ==
2021–22 Binghamton Bearcats men's basketball team
Players
Coaches

Pos.	#	Name	Height	Weight	Year	Previous school	Hometown
G	0	John McGriff	6 ft 0 in (1.83 m)	185 lb (84 kg)	So	St. John's	Glenn Dale, MD
G	1	Hakon Hjalmarsson	6 ft 3 in (1.91 m)	175 lb (79 kg)	Jr	Menntaskolinn Vid Sunday	Reykjavík, Iceland
F	2	Bryce Beamer	6 ft 6 in (1.98 m)	225 lb (102 kg)	Jr	College of Central Florida	Tampa, FL
G	3	Jacob Falko	6 ft 3 in (1.91 m)	190 lb (86 kg)	Jr	Gardner–Webb	North East, MD
G	4	Kellen Amos	6 ft 7 in (2.01 m)	190 lb (86 kg)	So	St. John XXIII HS	Houston, TX
F	10	George Tinsley	6 ft 6 in (1.98 m)	210 lb (95 kg)	Jr	Abington Heights HS	Clarks Summit, PA
G	11	Dan Petcash	6 ft 4 in (1.93 m)	205 lb (93 kg)	Jr	Pine-Richland HS	Pittsburgh, PA
F	13	Taveion White	6 ft 8 in (2.03 m)	220 lb (100 kg)	Jr	Clarendon College	Prosper, TX
C	15	Ador Athuai	6 ft 11 in (2.11 m)	200 lb (91 kg)	Jr	The Knox School	Twic, South Sudan
F	21	Ogheneyole Akuwovo	6 ft 9 in (2.06 m)	230 lb (104 kg)	So	Howard	Delta State, Nigeria
G	22	Alex Brodsky	6 ft 5 in (1.96 m)	200 lb (91 kg)	Jr	Dwight-Englewood School	Woodcliff Lake, NJ
G	23	Tyler Bertram	6 ft 3 in (1.91 m)	185 lb (84 kg)	So	UNC Charlotte	Cooperstown, NY
G	24	Christian Hinckson	6 ft 7 in (2.01 m)	210 lb (95 kg)	Jr	Manhattan	Queens, NY
F/C	32	Thomas Bruce	6 ft 9 in (2.06 m)	220 lb (100 kg)	Sr	DeMatha Catholic HS	Washington, D.C.
C	44	Yarden Willis	7 ft 0 in (2.13 m)	230 lb (104 kg)	Jr	Seward County CC	Roswell, GA

Head coach

- Levell Sanders (Seton Hall)

Assistant coach(es)

- Brian Johnson (Delaware)
- Marlon Guild (Hartford)
- Patrick Norris (Notre Dame)

Legend

- (C) Team captain
- (S) Suspended
- (I) Ineligible
- (W) Walk-on
- Injured
- Current redshirt

Roster
Last update: October 24, 2021

== Schedule and results ==
Date time, TV	Rank^{#}	Opponent^{#}	Result	Record	Site (attendance) city, state
Non-conference regular season
November 9, 2021*; 7:30 p.m., ESPN3		Cornell	L 69–76	0–1	Binghamton University Events Center (2,141); Vestal, NY
November 14, 2021*; 2:00 p.m.		at Sacred Heart	W 72–60	1–1	William H. Pitt Center (873); Fairfield, CT
November 17, 2021*; 7:00 p.m., ESPN+		at Columbia	L 77–85	1–2	Levien Gymnasium (630); New York City, NY
November 20, 2021*; 12:00 p.m., FS1		at No. 23 UConn	L 63–87	1–3	XL Center; Hartford, CT
November 28, 2021*; 2:00 p.m., ESPN3		Hartwick College	W 110–41	2–3	Binghamton University Events Center; Vestal, NY
December 1, 2021*; 7:00 p.m.		at Saint Joseph's	L 57–79	2–4	Hagan Arena; Philadelphia, PA
December 4, 2021*; 1:00 p.m., ESPN+		at Boston University	L 63–68	2–5	Case Gym (731); Boston, MA
December 8, 2021*; 7:00 p.m., ESPN+		Marist	L 51–64	2–6	Binghamton University Events Center (1,328); Vestal, NY
December 11, 2021*; 2:00 p.m.		Oneonta	W 79–55	3–6	Binghamton University Events Center (1,691); Vestal, NY
December 21, 2021*; 7:00 p.m.		Niagara	Canceled due to COVID-19 issues		Binghamton University Events Center; Vestal, NY
December 29, 2021*; 7:00 p.m.		Elmira College	Canceled due to COVID-19 issues		Binghamton University Events Center; Vestal, NY
America East regular season
January 2, 2022; 2:00 p.m., ESPN+		UMass Lowell	W 68–63	4–6 (1–0)	Binghamton University Events Center (1,202); Vestal, NY
January 6, 2022; 7:00 p.m., ESPN3		at Albany	W 88–79	5–6 (2–0)	SEFCU Arena (1,067); Albany, NY
January 8, 2022; 4:00 p.m., ESPN3		NJIT	L 56–67	5–7 (2–1)	Binghamton University Events Center (1,658); Vestal, NY
January 16, 2022; 1:00 p.m., ESPN3		at Maine	W 73–65	6–7 (3–1)	Cross Insurance Center (575); Bangor, ME
January 19, 2022; 7:00 p.m., ESPN+		Stony Brook	L 71–74	6–8 (3–2)	Binghamton University Events Center (1,201); Vestal, NY
January 22, 2022; 7:00 p.m., ESPN3		at NJIT	W 68–57	7–8 (4–2)	Wellness and Events Center (314); Newark, NJ
January 24, 2022; 7:30 p.m., ESPN+		Hartford; Rescheduled from January 12	W 74–64	8–8 (5–2)	Binghamton University Events Center (1,525); Vestal, NY
January 26, 2022; 7:00 p.m., ESPN+		at Hartford	L 60–72	8–9 (5–3)	Chase Arena (289); West Hartford, CT
January 29, 2022; 2:00 p.m., ESPN3		UMBC	L 68–70	8–10 (5–4)	Binghamton University Events Center (2,113); Vestal, NY
February 2, 2022; 7:00 p.m., ESPN3		at Stony Brook	W 77–61	9–10 (6–4)	Island Federal Arena (2,476); Stony Brook, NY
February 5, 2022; 2:00 p.m., ESPN3		Maine	W 69–60	10–10 (7–4)	Binghamton University Events Center (2,241); Vestal, NY
February 9, 2022; 7:00 p.m., ESPN+		at Vermont	L 51–82	10–11 (7–5)	Patrick Gym (2,124); Burlington, VT
February 12, 2022; 2:00 p.m., ESPN3		New Hampshire	L 60–69	10–12 (7–6)	Binghamton University Events Center (2,581); Vestal, NY
February 16, 2022; 7:00 p.m., ESPN+		Albany	L 67–68	10–13 (7–7)	Binghamton University Events Center (3,835); Vestal, NY
February 19, 2022; 5:00 p.m., ESPN3		at UMass Lowell	W 78–64	11–13 (8–7)	Tsongas Center (1,483); Lowell, MA
February 23, 2022; 7:00 p.m., ESPN+		Vermont	L 49–66	11–14 (8–8)	Binghamton University Events Center (1,855); Vestal, NY
February 26, 2022; 12:00 p.m., ESPN+		at New Hampshire	L 62–66	11–15 (8–9)	Lundholm Gym (747); Durham, NH
March 1, 2022; 7:00 p.m., ESPN+		at UMBC	L 68–78	11–16 (8–10)	Chesapeake Employers Insurance Arena (2,712); Catonsville, MD
America East tournament
March 6, 2022; 1:00 p.m., ESPN+	(6)	at (3) New Hampshire; Quarterfinals	W 72–69	12–16	Lundholm Gym (853); Durham, NH
March 9, 2022; 7:00 p.m., ESPN+	(6)	at (1) Vermont; Semifinals	L 42–74	12–17	Patrick Gym (2,290); Burlington, VT
*Non-conference game. ^{#}Rankings from AP poll. (#) Tournament seedings in parentheses. All times are in Eastern.
