= 2021–22 New Hampshire Wildcats men's basketball team =

American college basketball season

2021–22 New Hampshire Wildcats men's basketball
- Conference: America East Conference
- Record: 15–13 (10–8 America East)
- Head coach: Bill Herrion (17th season)
- Assistant coaches: Chris Mohr; Jordon Bronner; Ryan Herrion
- Home arena: Lundholm Gym

2021–22 America East Conference men's basketball standings
	Conf.				Overall
Team	W		L	PCT	W		L	PCT
Vermont †	17	–	1	.944	28	–	6	.824
UMBC	11	–	7	.611	18	–	14	.563
Stony Brook*	10	–	8	.556	18	–	13	.581
New Hampshire	10	–	8	.556	15	–	13	.536
Hartford	9	–	9	.500	12	–	20	.375
Albany	9	–	9	.500	13	–	18	.419
Binghamton	8	–	10	.444	12	–	17	.414
UMass Lowell	7	–	11	.389	15	–	16	.484
NJIT	6	–	12	.333	11	–	18	.379
Maine	3	–	15	.167	6	–	23	.207
† 2022 AmEast tournament winner *Ineligible for the 2022 AmEast tournament due to changing conferences in 2022

The 2021–22 New Hampshire Wildcats men's basketball team represented the University of New Hampshire in the 2021–22 NCAA Division I men's basketball season. They played their home games at the Lundholm Gym in Durham, New Hampshire and were led by 17th-year head coach Bill Herrion. They finished the season 15-13, 10-8 in America East Play to finish a tie for 2nd place. They lost in the quarterfinals of the America East tournament to Binghamton.

== Previous season ==
In a season limited due to the ongoing COVID-19 pandemic, the Wildcats finished the 2019–20 season 10-9, 9-6 in America East play to finish in third place. They lost in the quarterfinals of the America East tournament to UMass Lowell.

== Roster ==
2021–22 New Hampshire Wildcats men's basketball team
Players
Coaches

Pos.	#	Name	Height	Weight	Year	Previous school	Hometown
G	0	K.J. McClurg	6 ft 4 in (1.93 m)	185 lb (84 kg)	So	University HS	Morgantown, WV
C	1	Tayler Mattos	6 ft 11 in (2.11 m)	240 lb (109 kg)	Sr	Bowling Green	New London, NH
G	2	Qon Murphy	6 ft 5 in (1.96 m)	195 lb (88 kg)	Sr	Houston Baptist	Charlotte, NC
F	3	Nick Guadarrama	6 ft 5 in (1.96 m)	250 lb (113 kg)	Sr	Perkiomen School	Newington, CT
G	4	Jon Willeman	6 ft 2 in (1.88 m)	170 lb (77 kg)	So	Lebanon HS	Lebanon, NH
G	5	Josh Hopkins	6 ft 5 in (1.96 m)	210 lb (95 kg)	GS	James B. Dudley HS	Greensboro, NC
G	10	Nick Johnson	6 ft 4 in (1.93 m)	200 lb (91 kg)	So	All Hallows HS	The Bronx, NY
G	11	Blondeau Tchoukuiegno	6 ft 2 in (1.88 m)	190 lb (86 kg)	Sr	Montmorency School	Montreal, QC
F	12	Sloan Seymour	6 ft 9 in (2.06 m)	225 lb (102 kg)	Jr	George Washington	Albany, NY
G	14	A.J. Lopez	6 ft 5 in (1.96 m)	170 lb (77 kg)	Fr	Mount Zion Prep	Queens, NY
G	22	Marco Foster	6 ft 2 in (1.88 m)	180 lb (82 kg)	So	Sports Management	Chicago, IL
F	23	Chris Lester	6 ft 7 in (2.01 m)	230 lb (104 kg)	GS	Standard of Excellence Academy	Barrington, IL
F	25	Jayden Martinez	6 ft 7 in (2.01 m)	215 lb (98 kg)	Sr	Steele HS	Cibolo, TX

Head coach

- Bill Herrion (Merrimack)

Assistant coach(es)

- Chris Mohr (Merrimack)
- Jordon Bronner (New Hampshire)
- Ryan Herrion (New Hampshire)

Legend

- (C) Team captain
- (S) Suspended
- (I) Ineligible
- (W) Walk-on
- Injured
- Current redshirt

Roster
Last update: January 14, 2022

== Schedule and results ==
Date time, TV	Rank^{#}	Opponent^{#}	Result	Record	Site (attendance) city, state
Non-conference regular season
November 9, 2021*; 7:00 pm		Saint Joseph's (ME)	W 98–53	1–0	Lundholm Gym (603); Durham, NH
November 12, 2021*; 8:30 pm, FS2		at Marquette	L 70–75	1–1	Fiserv Forum (12,004); Milwaukee, WI
November 18, 2021*; 6:30 pm, FS2		at Providence	L 58–69	1–2	Dunkin' Donuts Center (4,872); Providence, RI
November 23, 2021*; 4:00 pm, ESPN3		Quinnipiac	W 84–69	2–2	Lundholm Gym (402); Durham, NH
November 27, 2021*; 2:00 pm, ESPN+		at Holy Cross	W 70–55	3–2	Hart Center (923); Worcester, MA
December 4, 2021*; 4:00 pm		Central Connecticut	W 67–45	4–2	Lundholm Gym (575); Durham, NH
December 8, 2021*; 7:30 pm		at Bryant	L 59–76	4–3	Chace Athletic Center (625); Smithfield, RI
December 11, 2021*; 1:00 pm, ESPN+		at Duquesne	L 62–64	4–4	UPMC Cooper Fieldhouse (1,578); Pittsburgh, PA
December 13, 2021*; 7:00 pm, ESPN3		Keene State	W 92–54	5–4	Lundholm Gym (413); Durham, NH
December 21, 2021*; 7:00 pm, ESPN+		at VCU	Cancelled due to COVID-19 issues		Siegel Center; Richmond, VA
December 29, 2021*; 1:00 pm, ESPN3		at Dartmouth	Postponed due to COVID-19 issues		Leede Arena; Hanover, NH
America East regular season
January 6, 2022; 7:00 pm, ESPNU		at Vermont	L 68–82	5–5 (0–1)	Patrick Gym (1,779); Burlington, VT
January 8, 2022; 12:00 pm, ESPN3		Albany	W 64–62	6–5 (1–1)	Lundholm Gym (339); Durham, NH
January 19, 2022; 7:00 pm, ESPN+		at Hartford	L 57–69	6–6 (1–2)	Chase Arena at Reich Family Pavilion (374); West Hartford, CT
January 22, 2022; 1:00 pm, ESPN3		UMass Lowell	W 67–61	7–6 (2–2)	Lundholm Gym (469); Durham, NH
January 24, 2022; 7:00 pm, ESPN3		at Maine	L 64–71	7–7 (2–3)	Cross Insurance Center (566); Bangor, ME
January 26, 2022; 7:00 pm, ESPN3		Maine; Rescheduled from January 12	W 73–61	8–7 (3–3)	Lundholm Gym (770); Durham, NH
January 28, 2022; 1:00 pm, ESPN3		Stony Brook	L 69–76	8–8 (3–4)	Lundholm Gym (421); Durham, NH
February 2, 2022; 7:00 pm, ESPN+		Hartford	W 70–64	9–8 (4–4)	Lundholm Gym (383); Durham, NH
February 5, 2022; 5:30 pm, ESPN3		at UMBC	L 77–88	9–9 (4–5)	Chesapeake Employers Insurance Arena (1,935); Catonsville, MD
February 7, 2022; 7:00 pm, ESPN3		at Stony Brook; Rescheduled from January 15	W 67–65	10–9 (5–5)	Island Federal Credit Union Arena (1,676); Stony Brook, NY
February 9, 2022; 7:00 pm, ESPN3		NJIT	L 55–60	10–10 (5–6)	Lundholm Gym (425); Durham, NH
February 12, 2022; 2:00 pm, ESPN3		at Binghamton	W 69–60	11–10 (6–6)	Binghamton University Events Center (2,581); Vestal, NY
February 14, 2022; 4:00 pm, ESPN+		UMBC; Rescheduled from January 2	W 68–62	12–10 (7–6)	Lundholm Gym (382); Durham, NH
February 16, 2022; 7:00 pm, ESPN+		Vermont	L 50–71	12–11 (7–7)	Lundholm Gym (791); Durham, NH
February 19, 2022; 4:00 pm, ESPN3		at Albany	L 65–70	12–12 (7–8)	SEFCU Arena (2,208); Albany, NY
February 23, 2022; 7:00 pm, ESPN+		at NJIT	W 83–55	13–12 (8–8)	Wellness and Events Center (341); Newark, NJ
February 26, 2022; 12:00 pm, ESPN+		Binghamton	W 66–62	14–12 (9–8)	Lundholm Gym (747); Durham, NH
March 1, 2022; 7:00 pm, ESPN+		at UMass Lowell	W 64–48	15–12 (10–8)	Costello Athletic Center (1,284); Lowell, MA
America East tournament
March 6, 2022; 1:00 pm, ESPN+	(3)	(6) Binghamton; Quarterfinals	L 69–72	15–13	Lundholm Gym (853); Durham, NH
*Non-conference game. ^{#}Rankings from AP Poll. (#) Tournament seedings in parentheses. All times are in Eastern.
