= 2021–22 NJIT Highlanders men's basketball team =

American college basketball season

2021–22 NJIT Highlanders men's basketball
- Conference: America East Conference
- Record: 11–18 (6–12 America East)
- Head coach: Brian Kennedy (6th season)
- Assistant coaches: Jeff Rafferty; Joe Gutowski; Ricardo Rush Jr.
- Home arena: Wellness and Events Center

2021–22 America East Conference men's basketball standings
	Conf.				Overall
Team	W		L	PCT	W		L	PCT
Vermont †	17	–	1	.944	28	–	6	.824
UMBC	11	–	7	.611	18	–	14	.563
Stony Brook*	10	–	8	.556	18	–	13	.581
New Hampshire	10	–	8	.556	15	–	13	.536
Hartford	9	–	9	.500	12	–	20	.375
Albany	9	–	9	.500	13	–	18	.419
Binghamton	8	–	10	.444	12	–	17	.414
UMass Lowell	7	–	11	.389	15	–	16	.484
NJIT	6	–	12	.333	11	–	18	.379
Maine	3	–	15	.167	6	–	23	.207
† 2022 AmEast tournament winner *Ineligible for the 2022 AmEast tournament due to changing conferences in 2022

The 2021–22 NJIT Highlanders men's basketball team represented the New Jersey Institute of Technology in the 2021–22 NCAA Division I men's basketball season. The Highlanders, led by sixth-year head coach Brian Kennedy, played their home games at the Wellness and Events Center in Newark, New Jersey as second-year members of the America East Conference. They finished the season 11–18, 6–12 in America East play, to finish in eighth place. They lost in the quarterfinals of the America East tournament to Vermont.

== Previous season ==
In a season limited due to the ongoing COVID-19 pandemic, the Highlanders finished the 2020–21 season 7–12, 6–10 in America East play, to finish in eighth place. They lost in the first round of the America East tournament to Albany.

== Roster ==
2021–22 NJIT Highlanders men's basketball team
Players
Coaches

Pos.	#	Name	Height	Weight	Year	Previous school	Hometown
G	0	Chauncey Sterling	6 ft 0 in (1.83 m)	180 lb (82 kg)	Jr	Concordia College (NY)	Willingboro, NJ
G	1	James Lee	6 ft 3 in (1.91 m)	180 lb (82 kg)	Jr	Salt Lake CC	Frederick, MD
G	2	Dylan O'Hearn	6 ft 4 in (1.93 m)	185 lb (84 kg)	Sr	Western Oklahoma State College	Windsor, ON
G	3	Jacob Mansson	6 ft 8 in (2.03 m)	185 lb (84 kg)	Fr	BC Luleå	Malmö, Sweden
F	5	Miles Coleman	6 ft 5 in (1.96 m)	210 lb (95 kg)	Sr	Indian River State College	West Palm Beach, FL
F	10	Eyal Nankin	6 ft 7 in (2.01 m)	210 lb (95 kg)	Fr	Emek Harod	Ra'anana, Israel
F	13	Jason Murphy	6 ft 8 in (2.03 m)	240 lb (109 kg)	RS So	St. Frances Academy	Owings Mills, MD
F	15	Matt Faw	6 ft 9 in (2.06 m)	225 lb (102 kg)	GS	Holy Cross	King of Prussia, PA
F	21	Souleymane Diakite	6 ft 9 in (2.06 m)	230 lb (104 kg)	Sr	St. Benedict's Prep	Bamako, Mali
G	23	Antwuan Butler (injured)	6 ft 0 in (1.83 m)	205 lb (93 kg)	Sr	Austin Peay	Philadelphia, PA
G	24	Mekhi Gray	6 ft 4 in (1.93 m)	190 lb (86 kg)	So	Putnam Science Academy	Montrose, NY
F	25	Keeshawn Mason	6 ft 9 in (2.06 m)	235 lb (107 kg)	Fr	Bella Vista Prep	Shawnee, KS
F	33	Kjell de Graaf	6 ft 10 in (2.08 m)	230 lb (104 kg)	RS Jr	Canarias Basketball Academy	Rotterdam, Netherlands
F	35	Da'mir Faison	6 ft 7 in (2.01 m)	200 lb (91 kg)	RS So	Hazleton Area HS	Philadelphia, PA

Head coach

- Brian Kennedy (Monmouth)

Assistant coach(es)

- Jeff Rafferty (Springfield)
- Joe Gutowski (Roanoke)
- Ricardo Rush Jr. (Maryland)

Legend

- (C) Team captain
- (S) Suspended
- (I) Ineligible
- (W) Walk-on
- Injured
- Current redshirt

Roster
Last update: January 11, 2022

== Schedule and results ==
Date time, TV	Rank^{#}	Opponent^{#}	Result	Record	Site (attendance) city, state
Regular season
November 11, 2021*; 7:00 p.m., ESPN3		Merrimack	L 54–61	0–1	Wellness and Events Center (557); Newark, NJ
November 13, 2021*; 7:00 p.m., ESPN+		at Lehigh	W 73–56	1–1	Stabler Arena (782); Bethlehem, PA
November 16, 2021*; 7:00 p.m., BTN+		at Rutgers	L 61–75	1–2	Jersey Mike's Arena (8,009); Piscataway, NJ
November 20, 2021*; 7:30 p.m.		at Wagner	Postponed due to COVID-19 issues		Spiro Sports Center; Staten Island, NY
November 24, 2021*; 2:00 p.m., ESPN3		Fairleigh Dickinson	W 62–54	2–2	Wellness and Events Center (327); Newark, NJ
November 27, 2021*; 4:00 p.m., FS2		at St. John's	L 68–77 ^{OT}	2–3	Carnesecca Arena (3,243); Queens, NY
November 30, 2021*; 7:00 p.m., ESPN3		Sacred Heart	W 75–70	3–3	Wellness and Events Center (311); Newark, NJ
December 2, 2021*; 7:00 p.m., ESPN3		Saint Elizabeth	W 76–43	4–3	Wellness and Events Center (328); Newark, NJ
December 5, 2021*; 2:00 p.m., ESPN+		at Lafayette	W 90–86 ^{2OT}	5–3	Kirby Sports Center (1,202); Easton, PA
December 10, 2021*; 7:00 p.m., ESPN3		Army	L 49–66	5–4	Wellness and Events Center (478); Newark, NJ
December 12, 2021*; 4:00 p.m., ESPNU		at Northwestern	L 52–70	5–5	Welsh–Ryan Arena (3,392); Evanston, IL
December 22, 2021*; 1:00 p.m., ESPN+		at UMass	Canceled due to COVID-19 protocols		Mullins Center; Amherst, MA
America East regular season
January 2, 2022; 2:00 p.m., ESPN+		Maine	W 69–66	6–5 (1–0)	Wellness and Events Center (228); Newark, NJ
January 6, 2022; 6:00 p.m., ESPN3		at UMass Lowell	W 77–72	7–5 (2–0)	Costello Athletic Center (242); Lowell, MA
January 8, 2022; 4:00 p.m., ESPN3		at Binghamton	W 67–56	8–5 (3–0)	Binghamton University Events Center (1,658); Vestal, NY
January 12, 2022; 7:00 p.m., ESPN+		UMBC	L 56–76	8–6 (3–1)	Wellness and Events Center (278); Newark, NJ
January 15, 2022; 4:00 p.m., ESPN3		at Albany	L 56–71	8–7 (3–2)	SEFCU Arena (1,225); Albany, NY
January 19, 2022; 7:00 p.m., ESPN+		Vermont	L 57–83	8–8 (3–3)	Wellness and Events Center (314); Newark, NJ
January 22, 2022; 7:00 p.m., ESPN3		Binghamton	L 57–68	8–9 (3–4)	Wellness and Events Center (314); Newark, NJ
January 26, 2022; 7:00 p.m., ESPN+		at UMBC	L 69–73	8–10 (3–5)	Chesapeake Employers Insurance Arena (1,207); Catonsville, MD
January 29, 2022; 7:00 p.m., ESPN3		Albany	L 53–64	8–11 (3–6)	Wellness and Events Center (229); Newark, NJ
February 2, 2022; 7:00 p.m., ESPN+		at Vermont	L 67–90	8–12 (3–7)	Patrick Gym (2,036); Burlington, VT
February 5, 2022; 7:00 p.m., ESPN3		Stony Brook	W 65–62	9–12 (4–7)	Wellness and Events Center (335); Newark, NJ
February 9, 2022; 7:00 p.m., ESPN3		at New Hampshire	W 60–55	10–12 (5–7)	Lundholm Gym (425); Durham, NH
February 12, 2022; 7:00 p.m., ESPN3		Hartford	L 49–65	10–13 (5–8)	Wellness and Events Center (541); Newark, NJ
February 16, 2022; 7:00 p.m., ESPN+		UMass Lowell	W 59–55	11–13 (6–8)	Wellness and Events Center (248); Newark, NJ
February 20, 2022; 1:00 p.m., ESPN3		at Maine	L 61–65	11–14 (6–9)	Memorial Gymnasium (564); Orono, ME
February 23, 2022; 7:00 p.m., ESPN+		New Hampshire	L 55–83	11–15 (6–10)	Wellness and Events Center (341); Newark, NJ
February 26, 2022; 2:00 p.m., ESPN3		at Hartford	L 62–83	11–16 (6–11)	Chase Arena (518); West Hartford, CT
March 1, 2022; 6:30 p.m., ESPN+		at Stony Brook	L 68–87	11–17 (6–12)	Island Federal Arena (1,833); Stony Brook, NY
America East tournament
March 6, 2022; 2:00 p.m., ESPN+	(8)	at (1) Vermont; Quarterfinals	L 59–98	11–18	Patrick Gym (2,199); Burlington, VT
*Non-conference game. ^{#}Rankings from AP poll. (#) Tournament seedings in parentheses. All times are in Eastern.
