= 2021–22 Maine Black Bears men's basketball team =

American college basketball season

2021–22 Maine Black Bears men's basketball
- Conference: America East Conference
- Record: 6–23 (3–15 America East)
- Head coach: Richard Barron (resigned 2/17/22) (4th season; 25); Jai Steadman (interim) (remainder)
- Assistant coaches: Michael Strickland; Kyle Drennan
- Home arena: Cross Insurance Center

2021–22 America East Conference men's basketball standings
	Conf.				Overall
Team	W		L	PCT	W		L	PCT
Vermont †	17	–	1	.944	28	–	6	.824
UMBC	11	–	7	.611	18	–	14	.563
Stony Brook*	10	–	8	.556	18	–	13	.581
New Hampshire	10	–	8	.556	15	–	13	.536
Hartford	9	–	9	.500	12	–	20	.375
Albany	9	–	9	.500	13	–	18	.419
Binghamton	8	–	10	.444	12	–	17	.414
UMass Lowell	7	–	11	.389	15	–	16	.484
NJIT	6	–	12	.333	11	–	18	.379
Maine	3	–	15	.167	6	–	23	.207
† 2022 AmEast tournament winner *Ineligible for the 2022 AmEast tournament due to changing conferences in 2022

The 2021–22 Maine Black Bears men's basketball team represented the University of Maine in the 2021–22 NCAA Division I men's basketball season. They played their home games at the Cross Insurance Center in Bangor, Maine and were led by fourth-year head coach Richard Barron until his resignation on February 17, 2022. Assistant coach Jai Steadman was named the interim head coach for the remainder of the season. They were members of the America East Conference. They finished the season 6–23, 3–15 in America East play to finish in last place. They failed to qualify for the America East Tournament.

On March 21, 2022, the school named former Maine player and Boston College assistant coach Chris Markwood the team's new head coach.

== Previous season ==
In a season limited due to the ongoing COVID-19 pandemic, the school opted out of the rest of the season on February 13, 2021, after playing only nine games. The Black Bears finished the 2020–21 season 2–7, 2–6 in America East play to finish in 10th place.

== Roster ==
2021–22 Maine Black Bears men's basketball team
Players
Coaches

Pos.	#	Name	Height	Weight	Year	Previous school	Hometown
G	0	Byron Ireland	6 ft 1 in (1.85 m)	—	Fr	St. Frances Academy	Annapolis, MD
G	1	Vukasin Masic	6 ft 5 in (1.96 m)	—	So	Hofstra	Belgrade, Serbia
G	2	Ja'Shonté Wright-McLeish	6 ft 4 in (1.93 m)	—	Jr	Collège Jean-de-Brébeuf	Montreal, Canada
G	3	Sam Ihekwoaba	6 ft 5 in (1.96 m)	—	Fr	Scotland Campus Prep	Orlando, FL
F	4	Ata Turgut	6 ft 9 in (2.06 m)	—	RS So	TED Ankara Kolejliler	Ankara, Turkey
G	5	Adefolarin Adetogun	6 ft 1 in (1.85 m)	—	So	Athol Murray College of Notre Dame	Regina, SK
F	10	Stephane Ingo (C)	6 ft 9 in (2.06 m)	—	RS Jr	Gould Academy	Mississauga, ON
F	11	Kristians Feierbergs	6 ft 8 in (2.03 m)	—	Fr	GBA Academy	Riga, Latvia
F	12	Milos Nenadic	6 ft 10 in (2.08 m)	—	Fr	Western Reserve Academy	Kitchener, ON
G	13	LeChaun DuHart	5 ft 10 in (1.78 m)	—	Jr	Western Wyoming	Aurora, CO
G	14	Matias Prock	6 ft 2 in (1.88 m)	—	So	Fork Union Military Academy	McLean, VA
G	15	Maks Klanjscek	6 ft 4 in (1.93 m)	—	Jr	Salt Lake CC	Ljubljana, Slovenia
C	21	Chris Efretuei	7 ft 1 in (2.16 m)	—	GS	Louisiana–Monroe	Abuja, Nigeria
G	31	Novak Perovic	6 ft 7 in (2.01 m)	—	Fr	Hoosac School	Belgrade, Serbia
F	44	Peter Filipovity	6 ft 7 in (2.01 m)	—	So	Utah State Eastern	Kaposvár, Hungary

Head coach

- Richard Barron (Kenyon)

Assistant coach(es)

- Jason Steadman (Nebraska)
- Michael Strickland (Randolph–Macon)
- Kyle Drennan (Colorado)

Legend

- (C) Team captain
- (S) Suspended
- (I) Ineligible
- (W) Walk-on
- Injured
- Current redshirt

Roster
Last update: January 14, 2022

== Schedule and results ==
Date time, TV	Rank^{#}	Opponent^{#}	Result	Record	Site (attendance) city, state
Non-conference regular season
November 9, 2021; 8:00 pm, ACC Network Extra		at Virginia Tech	L 47–82	0–1	Cassell Coliseum (6,473); Blacksburg, VA
November 12, 2021; 5:00 pm, ESPN3		UMaine Farmington	W 71–52	1–1	Cross Insurance Center (707); Bangor, ME
November 15, 2021; 8:00 pm, P12N		at Colorado	L 46–90	1–2	CU Events Center (5,633); Boulder, CO
November 19, 2021; 7:00 pm, ESPN+		UMaine Fort Kent	W 75–43	2–2	Memorial Gymnasium (755); Orono, ME
November 23, 2021; 7:00 pm, ESPN+		Central Connecticut	L 56–64	2–3	Cross Insurance Center (672); Bangor, ME
November 27, 2021; 3:00 pm, ESPN3		at Bradley	L 39–71	2–4	Carver Arena (3,515); Peoria, IL
December 4, 2021; 2:00 pm		at Columbia	L 66–77	2–5	Levien Gymnasium (662); New York, NY
December 11, 2021; 2:00 pm, ESPN3		at Quinnipiac	L 47–73	2–6	People's United Center; Hamden, CT
December 18, 2021; 1:00 pm		University of New England	W 86–50	3–6	Memorial Gymnasium (533); Orono, ME
December 21, 2021; 5:00 pm		Merrimack	L 47–49	3–7	Cross Insurance Center (453); Bangor, ME
December 30, 2021; 7:00 pm, BTN		at Rutgers	L 64–80	3–8	Jersey Mike's Arena (7,638); Piscataway, NJ
America East Conference regular season
January 2, 2022; 2:00 pm, ESPN+		at NJIT	L 66–69	3–9 (0–1)	Wellness and Events Center (228); Newark, NJ
January 8, 2022; 2:00 pm, ESPN3		at Stony Brook	L 72–80	3–10 (0–2)	Island Federal Credit Union Arena (1,551); Stony Brook, NY
January 16, 2022; 1:00 pm, ESPN3		Binghamton	L 65–73	3–11 (0–3)	Cross Insurance Center (575); Bangor, ME
January 19, 2022; 7:00 pm, ESPN3		at UMass Lowell	L 62–71	3–12 (0–4)	Costello Athletic Center (605); Lowell, MA
January 22, 2022; 12:00 pm, ESPN3		UMBC	L 46–88	3–13 (0–5)	Cross Insurance Center (656); Bangor, ME
January 24, 2022; 7:00 pm, ESPN3		New Hampshire	W 71–64	4–13 (1–5)	Cross Insurance Center (566); Bangor, ME
January 26, 2022; 7:00 pm, ESPN3		at New Hampshire; Rescheduled from January 12	L 61–73	4–14 (1–6)	Lundholm Gym (770); Durham, NH
January 29, 2022; 1:00 pm, ESPN3		at Vermont	L 68–81	4–15 (1–7)	Patrick Gym (2,452); Burlington, VT
January 31, 2022; 7:00 pm, ESPN+		Hartford; Rescheduled from January 6	L 66–78	4–16 (1–8)	Cross Insurance Center (533); Bangor, ME
February 2, 2022; 7:00 pm, ESPN+		UMass Lowell	L 50–62	4–17 (1–9)	Cross Insurance Center (465); Bangor, ME
February 5, 2022; 2:00 pm, ESPN3		at Binghamton	L 60–69	4–18 (1–10)	Binghamton University Events Center (2,241); Binghamton, NY
February 9, 2022; 7:00 pm, ESPN+		at Albany	W 73–63	5–18 (2–10)	SEFCU Arena (1,544); Albany, NY
February 13, 2022; 1:00 pm, ESPN+		Stony Brook	L 74–85	5–19 (2–11)	Cross Insurance Center (573); Bangor, ME
February 16, 2022; 7:00 pm, ESPN+		at Hartford	L 65–75	5–20 (2–12)	Chase Arena at Reich Family Pavilion (502); West Hartford, CT
February 20, 2022; 1:00 pm, ESPN3		NJIT	W 65–61	6–20 (3–12)	Memorial Gymnasium (564); Orono, ME
February 23, 2022; 7:00 pm, ESPN3		Albany	L 68–72	6–21 (3–13)	Memorial Gymnasium (581); Orono, ME
February 26, 2022; 1:00 pm, ESPN3		at UMBC	L 79–93	6–22 (3–14)	Chesapeake Employers Insurance Arena (1,714); Catonsville, MD
March 1, 2022; 7:00 pm, ESPN+		Vermont	L 56–75	6–23 (3–15)	Cross Insurance Center (697); Bangor, ME
*Non-conference game. ^{#}Rankings from AP Poll. (#) Tournament seedings in parentheses. All times are in Eastern.
