= 2021–22 UMass Lowell River Hawks men's basketball team =

American college basketball season

2021–22 UMass Lowell River Hawks men's basketball
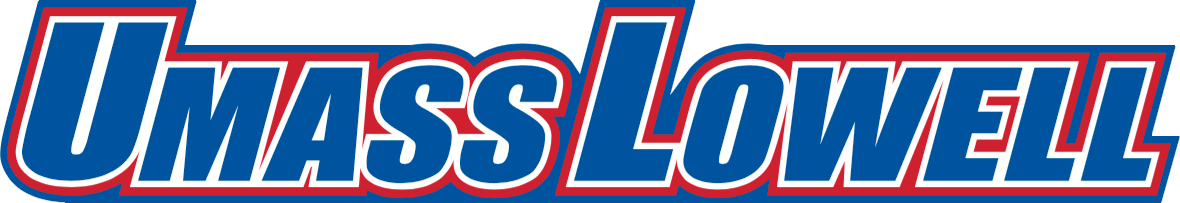
- Conference: America East Conference
- Record: 15–16 (7–11 America East)
- Head coach: Pat Duquette (9th season)
- Assistant coaches: Louis Hinnant; Biko Paris; Jon Iati
- Home arena: Costello Athletic Center

2021–22 America East Conference men's basketball standings
	Conf.				Overall
Team	W		L	PCT	W		L	PCT
Vermont †	17	–	1	.944	28	–	6	.824
UMBC	11	–	7	.611	18	–	14	.563
Stony Brook*	10	–	8	.556	18	–	13	.581
New Hampshire	10	–	8	.556	15	–	13	.536
Hartford	9	–	9	.500	12	–	20	.375
Albany	9	–	9	.500	13	–	18	.419
Binghamton	8	–	10	.444	12	–	17	.414
UMass Lowell	7	–	11	.389	15	–	16	.484
NJIT	6	–	12	.333	11	–	18	.379
Maine	3	–	15	.167	6	–	23	.207
† 2022 AmEast tournament winner *Ineligible for the 2022 AmEast tournament due to changing conferences in 2022

The 2021–22 UMass Lowell River Hawks men's basketball team represented the University of Massachusetts Lowell in the 2021–22 NCAA Division I men's basketball season. They played their home games at the Costello Athletic Center in Lowell, Massachusetts and were led by ninth-year head coach Pat Duquette. They finished the season 15-16, 7-11 in America East Play to finish in 7th place. They lost in the quarterfinals of the America East tournament to UMBC.

== Previous season ==
In a season limited due to the ongoing COVID-19 pandemic, the River Hawks finished the 2020–21 season 11–12, 7–8 in America East play to finish in sixth place. They fell to Hartford in the America East Conference Championship.

== Roster ==
2021–22 UMass Lowell River Hawks men's basketball team
Players
Coaches

Pos.	#	Name	Height	Weight	Year	Previous school	Hometown
G	0	Justin Faison	6 ft 0 in (1.83 m)	175 lb (79 kg)	GS	Elizabeth City State	Prince George's County, MD
G	1	Bryce Daley	6 ft 4 in (1.93 m)	190 lb (86 kg)	RS Jr	Salisbury School	Pittsfield, MA
G	2	Kalil Thomas	6 ft 5 in (1.96 m)	190 lb (86 kg)	Jr	Holy Cross HS	New Orleans, LA
G	3	Gregory Hammond	6 ft 6 in (1.98 m)	210 lb (95 kg)	Jr	Rhode Island	New Orleans, LA
G	4	Ayinde Hikim	5 ft 11 in (1.8 m)	179 lb (81 kg)	So	La Salle	Washington, D.C.
F	5	Connor Withers	6 ft 7 in (2.01 m)	195 lb (88 kg)	Jr	Osbourn HS	Manassas, VA
F	10	Max Brooks	6 ft 7 in (2.01 m)	205 lb (93 kg)	So	St. Charles HS	Waldorf, MD
G	11	Everette Hammond	6 ft 3 in (1.91 m)	—	Sr	USC Upstate	Silver Spring, MD
F	12	Darion Jordan-Thomas	6 ft 7 in (2.01 m)	210 lb (95 kg)	Jr	Wagner	Brockton, MA
G/F	13	Quinton Mincey	6 ft 7 in (2.01 m)	195 lb (88 kg)	So	Mount St. Mary's	Upper Marlboro, MD
G	14	Anthony Blunt	6 ft 2 in (1.88 m)	185 lb (84 kg)	So	St. Vincent Pallotti HS	Crownsville, MD
F	15	Allin Blunt	6 ft 7 in (2.01 m)	205 lb (93 kg)	Sr	Gonzaga College HS	Crownsville, MD
F	22	Caleb Bates	6 ft 7 in (2.01 m)	230 lb (104 kg)	So	Lake Shore HS	Detroit, Michigan
F	23	John Hall	6 ft 7 in (2.01 m)	208 lb (94 kg)	GS	Portland State	Philadelphia, Pennsylvania
F	33	Ephraim Acquah	6 ft 7 in (2.01 m)	192 lb (87 kg)	Fr	Williamsport HS	Hagerstown, MD

Head coach

- Pat Duquette (Williams)

Assistant coach(es)

- Louis Hinnant (Boston College)
- Biko Paris (Boston College)
- Jon Iati (Albany)

Legend

- (C) Team captain
- (S) Suspended
- (I) Ineligible
- (W) Walk-on
- Injured
- Current redshirt

Roster
Last update: January 14, 2022

== Schedule and results ==
Date time, TV	Rank^{#}	Opponent^{#}	Result	Record	Site (attendance) city, state
Non-conference regular season
November 9, 2021*; 7:00 pm, ESPN3		Rivier	W 91–55	1–0	Costello Athletic Center (780); Lowell, MA
November 13, 2021*; 6:00 pm, ESPN+		at Dayton	W 59–58	2–0	UD Arena (13,407); Dayton, OH
November 16, 2021*; 5:00 pm, FloHoops		vs. Oklahoma State; Basketball Hall of Fame Showcase	L 58–80	2–1	Mohegan Sun Arena (0); Uncasville, CT
November 17, 2021*; 5:00 pm, FloHoops		vs. Central Connecticut; Basketball Hall of Fame Showcase	W 77–53	3–1	Mohegan Sun Arena (1,000); Uncasville, CT
November 19, 2021*; 7:00 pm, ESPN+		at George Washington	W 67–56	4–1	Charles E. Smith Center (1,424); Washington, D.C.
November 24, 2021*; 7:00 pm, ESPN+		at UMass	L 81–92	4–2	Mullins Center (1,492); Amherst, MA
November 27, 2021*; 1:00 pm, ESPN3		Fisher	W 101–38	5–2	Costello Athletic Center (469); Lowell, MA
December 1, 2021*; 7:00 pm, ESPN3		Brown	L 63–73	5–3	Costello Athletic Center (900); Lowell, MA
December 4, 2021*; 7:00 pm		at Merrimack	W 61–57	6–3	Hammel Court (2,632); North Andover, MA
December 8, 2021*; 7:00 pm, ESPN+		at Boston University	L 62–72	6–4	Case Gym (914); Boston, MA
December 11, 2021*; 1:00 pm		MCLA	W 109–45	7–4	Costello Athletic Center (225); Lowell, MA
December 19, 2021*; 1:00 pm, ESPN3		vs. Sacred Heart	W 70–62	8–4	Tsongas Center (812); Lowell, MA
December 23, 2021*; 1:00 pm, ESPN3		St. Francis Brooklyn	Canceled due to COVID-19 issues		Costello Athletic Center; Lowell, MA
America East regular season
January 2, 2022; 2:00 pm, ESPN+		at Binghamton	L 63–68	8–5 (0–1)	Binghamton University Events Center (1,202); Binghamton, NY
January 6, 2022; 7:00 pm, ESPN3		NJIT	L 72–77	8–6 (0–2)	Costello Athletic Center (242); Lowell, MA
January 8, 2022; 5:30 pm, ESPN3		at UMBC	W 66–64	9–6 (1–2)	Chesapeake Employers Insurance Arena (923); Catonsville, MD
January 12, 2022; 7:00 pm, ESPN3		at Albany	L 47–57	9–7 (1–3)	SEFCU Arena (1,164); Albany, NY
January 19, 2022; 7:00 pm, ESPN3		Maine	W 71–62	10–7 (2–3)	Costello Athletic Center (605); Lowell, MA
January 22, 2022; 12:00 pm, ESPN3		at New Hampshire	L 61–67	10–8 (2–4)	Lundholm Gym (469); Durham, NH
January 26, 2022; 7:00 pm, ESPN+		Albany	L 62–64 ^{OT}	10–9 (2–5)	Costello Athletic Center (455); Lowell, MA
February 2, 2022; 7:00 pm, ESPN+		at Maine	W 62–50	11–9 (3–5)	Cross Insurance Center (465); Bangor, ME
February 5, 2022; 1:00 pm, ESPN3		Vermont	L 67–78	11–10 (3–6)	Costello Athletic Center (602); Lowell, MA
February 7, 2022; 6:00 pm, ESPN+		Hartford; Rescheduled from January 15	W 85–75	12–10 (4–6)	Costello Athletic Center (397); Lowell, MA
February 9, 2022; 6:30 pm, ESPN+		at Stony Brook	L 85–87	12–11 (4–7)	Island Federal Credit Union Arena (1,850); Stony Brook, NY
February 12, 2022; 5:00 pm, ESPN3		UMBC	W 88–71	13–11 (5–7)	Tsongas Center (2,215); Lowell, MA
February 16, 2022; 7:00 pm, ESPN+		at NJIT	L 55–59	13–12 (5–8)	Wellness and Events Center (248); Newark, NJ
February 19, 2022; 5:00 pm, ESPN3		Binghamton	L 64–78	13–13 (5–9)	Tsongas Center (1,483); Lowell, MA
February 23, 2022; 7:00 pm, ESPN+		Stony Brook	W 67–50	14–13 (6–9)	Costello Athletic Center (501); Lowell, MA
February 26, 2022; 2:00 pm, ESPN3		at Vermont	L 61–62	14–14 (6–10)	Patrick Gym (2,606); Burlington, VT
March 1, 2022; 7:00 pm, ESPN+		New Hampshire	L 48–64	14–15 (6–11)	Tsongas Center (1,284); Lowell, MA
March 3, 2022; 7:00 pm, ESPN3		at Hartford; Rescheduled from January 29	W 83–73	15–15 (7–11)	Chase Arena at Reich Family Pavilion (436); West Hartford, CT
America East tournament
March 6, 2022; 1:00 pm, ESPN+	(7)	at (2) UMBC; Quarterfinals	L 85–93 ^{OT}	15–16	Chesapeake Employers Insurance Arena (1,925); Catonsville, MD
*Non-conference game. ^{#}Rankings from AP Poll. (#) Tournament seedings in parentheses. All times are in Eastern.
