= 2021–22 Vermont Catamounts men's basketball team =

American college basketball season

2021–22 Vermont Catamounts men's basketball

America East regular season and tournament champions

NCAA tournament, First Round
- Conference: America East Conference
- Record: 28–6 (17–1 America East)
- Head coach: John Becker (11th season)
- Associate head coach: Ryan Schneider
- Assistant coaches: Bryson Johnson; Chris Santo
- Home arena: Patrick Gym

2021–22 America East Conference men's basketball standings
	Conf.				Overall
Team	W		L	PCT	W		L	PCT
Vermont †	17	–	1	.944	28	–	6	.824
UMBC	11	–	7	.611	18	–	14	.563
Stony Brook*	10	–	8	.556	18	–	13	.581
New Hampshire	10	–	8	.556	15	–	13	.536
Hartford	9	–	9	.500	12	–	20	.375
Albany	9	–	9	.500	13	–	18	.419
Binghamton	8	–	10	.444	12	–	17	.414
UMass Lowell	7	–	11	.389	15	–	16	.484
NJIT	6	–	12	.333	11	–	18	.379
Maine	3	–	15	.167	6	–	23	.207
† 2022 AmEast tournament winner *Ineligible for the 2022 AmEast tournament due to changing conferences in 2022

The 2021–22 Vermont Catamounts men's basketball team represented the University of Vermont in the 2021–22 NCAA Division I men's basketball season. They played their home games at the Patrick Gym in Burlington, Vermont and were led by eleventh-year head coach John Becker. They finished the season 28–6, 17–1 in America East play, to finish as regular-season champions. They defeated NJIT, Binghamton and UMBC to with the America East tournament. As a result, they received the conference's automatic bid to the NCAA tournament as the No. 13 seed in the West Region where they lost in the first round to Arkansas.

This was to be the team's last season at Patrick Gym, but their new arena, Tarrant Event Center, was put on indefinite hold, due to a combination of the COVID-19 pandemic and rising borrowing costs.

== Previous season ==
In a season limited due to the ongoing COVID-19 pandemic, the Catamounts finished the 2020–21 season 10–5, 10–4 in America East play, to tie the regular-season conference championship with UMBC. They lost to Hartford in the first round of the America East tournament.

== Roster ==
2021–22 Vermont Catamounts men's basketball team
Players
Coaches

Pos.	#	Name	Height	Weight	Year	Previous school	Hometown
G	0	Evan Guillory	6 ft 4 in (1.93 m)	208 lb (94 kg)	Fr	New Hampton School	Springfield, MO
G	1	Aaron Deloney	6 ft 0 in (1.83 m)	165 lb (75 kg)	Jr	Grant HS	Portland, OR
G	2	Sam Alamutu (redshirt)	6 ft 5 in (1.96 m)	215 lb (98 kg)	Fr	Rothesay Netherwood School	Ajax, ON
G	4	Kam Gibson	6 ft 3 in (1.91 m)	190 lb (86 kg)	Sr	Western Carolina	Cincinnati, OH
F	5	Duncan Demuth	6 ft 8 in (2.03 m)	210 lb (95 kg)	Sr	Oklahoma State	Seminole, FL
F	12	Bailey Patella	6 ft 5 in (1.96 m)	185 lb (84 kg)	Sr	Vermont Academy	Lenox, MA
F	14	Isaiah Powell	6 ft 6 in (1.98 m)	220 lb (100 kg)	Sr	Colonie HS	Albany, NY
G	15	Finn Sullivan	6 ft 4 in (1.93 m)	195 lb (88 kg)	Sr	San Diego	San Diego, CA
G	20	Eric Beckett	6 ft 4 in (1.93 m)	225 lb (102 kg)	Jr	Tilton School	Ajax, ON
G	21	Justin Mazzulla	6 ft 3 in (1.91 m)	195 lb (88 kg)	Sr	George Washington	Johnston, RI
G	24	Ben Shungu	6 ft 2 in (1.88 m)	200 lb (91 kg)	GS	Rice Memorial HS	South Burlington, VT
G	25	Michel Ndayishimiye (W) (redshirt)	5 ft 10 in (1.78 m)	180 lb (82 kg)	Fr	Rice Memorial HS	Burlington, VT
F	32	Nick Fiorillo (W)	6 ft 7 in (2.01 m)	210 lb (95 kg)	RS So	Scarborough HS	Scarborough, ME
F	34	Georges Lefebvre	6 ft 9 in (2.06 m)	200 lb (91 kg)	So	Cape Fear Academy	Montreal, QC
F	35	Ryan Davis	6 ft 8 in (2.03 m)	250 lb (113 kg)	Sr	Conant HS	Schaumburg, IL
G	55	Robin Duncan	6 ft 5 in (1.96 m)	190 lb (86 kg)	Sr	Evansville Harrison HS	Evansville, IN

Head coach

- John Becker (Catholic)

Assistant coach(es)

- Ryan Schneider (Marist)
- Bryson Johnson (Bucknell)
- Chris Santo (Saint Anselm)

Legend

- (C) Team captain
- (S) Suspended
- (I) Ineligible
- (W) Walk-on
- Injured
- Current redshirt

Roster
Last update: January 11, 2022

== Schedule and results ==
Date time, TV	Rank^{#}	Opponent^{#}	Result	Record	Site (attendance) city, state
Exhibition
October 30, 2021*; 2:00 p.m.		Saint Michael's	W 105–60		Patrick Gym (2,438); Burlington, VT
November 6, 2021*; 2:00 p.m.		Saint Anselm	W 94–72		Patrick Gym (2,348); Burlington, VT
Non-conference regular season
November 11, 2021*; 6:00 p.m., ESPN+		at Northern Iowa	W 71–57	1–0	McLeod Center (1,773); Cedar Falls, IA
November 13, 2021*; 2:00 p.m., B1G+		at No. 21 Maryland	L 57–68	1–1	Xfinity Center (13,424); College Park, MD
November 16, 2021*; 7:00 p.m., ESPN3		WPI	W 81–48	2–1	Patrick Gym (2,004); Burlington, VT
November 19, 2021*; 4:00 p.m., ESPN+		Yale	W 61–53	3–1	Patrick Gym (2,188); Burlington, VT
November 22, 2021*; 1:30 p.m., FloSports		vs. Oakland; Gulf Coast Showcase	L 61–63	3–2	Hertz Arena (415); Estero, FL
November 23, 2021*; 11:00 a.m., FloSports		vs. Evansville; Gulf Coast Showcase	W 58–49	4–2	Hertz Arena (337); Estero, FL
November 24, 2021*; 1:30 p.m., FloSports		vs. Appalachian State; Gulf Coast Showcase	W 65–63	5–2	Hertz Arena (213); Estero, FL
November 27, 2021*; 5:00 p.m., ESPN+		at UNC Greensboro	L 51–54	5–3	Greensboro Coliseum (1,739); Greensboro, NC
December 1, 2021*; 7:00 p.m., ESPN3		Dartmouth	W 83–65	6–3	Patrick Gym (2,321); Burlington, VT
December 7, 2021*; 6:30 p.m., FS1		at Providence	L 58–68	6–4	Dunkin' Donuts Center (5,087); Providence, RI
December 10, 2021*; 7:00 p.m., ESPN+		at Brown	W 70–65	7–4	Pizzitola Sports Center (1,226); Providence, RI
December 19, 2021*; 1:00 p.m.		at Northeastern	Canceled due to COVID-19 issues		Matthews Arena; Boston, MA
December 22, 2021*; 2:00 p.m., ESPN3		Colgate	W 78–68	8–4	Patrick Gym (1,964); Burlington, VT
America East regular season
January 6, 2022; 7:00 p.m., ESPNU		New Hampshire	W 82–68	9–4 (1–0)	Patrick Gym (1,779); Burlington, VT
January 12, 2022; 7:00 p.m., ESPN3		Stony Brook	W 98–65	10–4 (2–0)	Patrick Gym (1,929); Burlington, VT
January 15, 2022; 1:00 p.m., ESPN3		at UMBC	W 86–69	11–4 (3–0)	Chesapeake Employers Insurance Arena (1,028); Catonsville, MD
January 19, 2022; 7:00 p.m., ESPN+		at NJIT	W 83–57	12–4 (4–0)	Wellness and Events Center (314); Newark, NJ
January 22, 2022; 7:00 p.m., ESPN3		Hartford	W 82–72	13–4 (5–0)	Patrick Gym (2,519); Burlington, VT
January 26, 2022; 6:31 p.m., ESPN+		at Stony Brook	W 80–67	14–4 (6–0)	Island Federal Arena (2,504); Stony Brook, NY
January 29, 2022; 2:00 p.m., ESPN3		Maine	W 81–68	15–4 (7–0)	Patrick Gym (2,452); Burlington, VT
January 31, 2022; 7:00 p.m., ESPN+		Albany; Rescheduled from January 2	W 73–61	16–4 (8–0)	Patrick Gym (2,096); Burlington, VT
February 2, 2022; 7:00 p.m., ESPN+		NJIT	W 90–67	17–4 (9–0)	Patrick Gym (2,036); Burlington, VT
February 5, 2022; 1:00 p.m., ESPN3		at UMass Lowell	W 78–67	18–4 (10–0)	Costello Athletic Center (602); Lowell, MA
February 9, 2022; 7:00 p.m., ESPN+		Binghamton	W 82–51	19–4 (11–0)	Patrick Gym (2,124); Burlington, VT
February 12, 2022; 7:00 p.m., ESPN3		at Albany	W 76–63	20–4 (12–0)	SEFCU Arena (2,403); Albany, NY
February 14, 2022; 7:00 p.m., ESPN3		at Hartford; Rescheduled from January 8	L 74–75 ^{OT}	20–5 (12–1)	Chase Arena (390); West Hartford, CT
February 16, 2022; 7:00 p.m., ESPN+		at New Hampshire	W 71–50	21–5 (13–1)	Lundholm Gym (791); Durham, NH
February 19, 2022; 12:00 p.m., ESPN3		UMBC	W 86–59	22–5 (14–1)	Patrick Gym (2,645); Burlington, VT
February 23, 2022; 7:00 p.m., ESPN+		at Binghamton	W 66–49	23–5 (15–1)	Binghamton University Events Center (1,855); Vestal, NY
February 26, 2022; 2:00 p.m., ESPN3		UMass Lowell	W 62–61	24–5 (16–1)	Patrick Gym (2,606); Burlington, VT
March 1, 2022; 7:00 p.m., ESPN+		at Maine	W 75–56	25–5 (17–1)	Cross Insurance Center (697); Bangor, ME
America East tournament
March 6, 2022; 2:00 p.m., ESPN+	(1)	(8) NJIT; Quarterfinals	W 98–59	26–5	Patrick Gym (2,199); Burlington, VT
March 9, 2022; 7:00 p.m., ESPN+	(1)	(6) Binghamton; Semifinals	W 74–42	27–5	Patrick Gym (2,290); Burlington, VT
March 12, 2022; 11:00 a.m., ESPN2	(1)	(2) UMBC; Championship	W 82–43	28–5	Patrick Gym (3,266); Burlington, VT
NCAA tournament
March 17, 2022; 9:20 p.m., TNT	(13 W)	vs. (4 W) No. 17 Arkansas; First round	L 71–75	28–6	KeyBank Center (16,194); Buffalo, NY
*Non-conference game. ^{#}Rankings from AP poll. (#) Tournament seedings in parentheses. W=West. All times are in Eastern.
