= 2021–22 Stony Brook Seawolves men's basketball team =

American college basketball season

2021–22 Stony Brook Seawolves men's basketball
- Conference: America East Conference
- Record: 18–13 (10–8 America East)
- Head coach: Geno Ford (3rd season)
- Assistant coaches: Bryan Weber; Dan Rickard; Jalen Avery
- Home arena: Island Federal Credit Union Arena

2021–22 America East Conference men's basketball standings
	Conf.				Overall
Team	W		L	PCT	W		L	PCT
Vermont †	17	–	1	.944	28	–	6	.824
UMBC	11	–	7	.611	18	–	14	.563
Stony Brook*	10	–	8	.556	18	–	13	.581
New Hampshire	10	–	8	.556	15	–	13	.536
Hartford	9	–	9	.500	12	–	20	.375
Albany	9	–	9	.500	13	–	18	.419
Binghamton	8	–	10	.444	12	–	17	.414
UMass Lowell	7	–	11	.389	15	–	16	.484
NJIT	6	–	12	.333	11	–	18	.379
Maine	3	–	15	.167	6	–	23	.207
† 2022 AmEast tournament winner *Ineligible for the 2022 AmEast tournament due to changing conferences in 2022

The 2021–22 Stony Brook Seawolves men's basketball team represented Stony Brook University in the 2021–22 NCAA Division I men's basketball season. They played their home games at the Island Federal Credit Union Arena in Stony Brook, New York and were led by third-year head coach Geno Ford. They competed as members of the America East Conference.

The 2021–22 season was the program's last season as an America East member. Stony Brook will join the Colonial Athletic Association on July 1, 2022. However they announced Stony Brook was not eligible for the America East conference tournament that season.

== Previous season ==
In a season limited due to the ongoing COVID-19 pandemic, the Seawolves finished the 2020–21 season 9–14, 7–9 in America East play to finish in seventh place. They lost in the opening round of the America East tournament to UMass Lowell. Mouhamadou Gueye won the America East Defensive Player of the Year award.

== Offseason ==
=== Departures ===
Name	Number	Pos.	Height	Weight	Year	Hometown	Notes
Juwan White	1	G	6'2"	185	Junior	Dacula, GA	Transferred to Texas A&M International
Mouhamadou Gueye	2	F	6'9"	210	Senior	Staten Island, NY	Transferred to Pittsburgh
Leighton Elliott-Sewell	3	F	6'6"	187	Junior	Derby, England	Transferred to St. Thomas Aquinas
Jordan McKenzie	10	G	6'1"	190	Senior	Concord, NC	Graduated
Tavin Pierre Philippe	15	G	6'3"	187	Sophomore	Freeport, NY	Transferred to New Haven
Lenny Kadisha	24	G	6'4"	238	Senior	Corona, NY	Graduated

=== Incoming transfers ===
Name	Number	Pos.	Height	Weight	Year	Hometown	Previous School
Jahlil Jenkins	1	G	6'0"	160	Graduate	Ranson, WV	Transferred from Fairleigh Dickinson
Elijah Olaniyi	3	G	6'5"	205	Graduate	Newark, NJ	Transferred from Miami (FL)
Anthony Roberts	15	G	6'4"	200	R-Junior	Detroit, MI	Transferred from St. Bonaventure
Tanahj Pettway	22	G	6'2"	185	R-Soph.	Worcester, MA	Transferred from Indian River

=== 2021 recruiting class ===
College recruiting information
Name	Hometown	School	Height	Weight	Commit date
Payton Shumpert; SF	Syracuse, NY	Woodstock Academy	6 ft 6 in (1.98 m)	205 lb (93 kg)	Sep 30, 2020
Payton Shumpert; SF	Recruit ratings: Scout: Rivals: (NR)				
Kaine Roberts; SG	Tokyo, Japan	Santa Margarita Catholic High School	6 ft 2 in (1.88 m)	185 lb (84 kg)	Jan 12, 2021
Kaine Roberts; SG	Recruit ratings: Scout: Rivals: (NR)				
Overall recruit ranking:
Note: In many cases, Scout, Rivals, 247Sports, On3, and ESPN may conflict in their listings of height and weight.; In these cases, the average was taken. ESPN grades are on a 100-point scale.; Sources: "2021 Team Ranking". Rivals.

== Roster ==
2021–22 Stony Brook Seawolves men's basketball team
Players
Coaches

Pos.	#	Name	Height	Weight	Year	Previous school	Hometown
G	1	Jahlil Jenkins (injured)	6 ft 0 in (1.83 m)	160 lb (73 kg)	GS	Virginia Academy; Fairleigh Dickinson	Ranson, WV
F	2	Frankie Policelli	6 ft 7 in (2.01 m)	215 lb (98 kg)	RS So	Long Island Lutheran HS; Dayton	New Hartford, NY
G	3	Elijah Olaniyi	6 ft 5 in (1.96 m)	205 lb (93 kg)	GS	Newark East Side	Newark, NJ
G	4	Tykei Greene	6 ft 4 in (1.93 m)	205 lb (93 kg)	RS Jr	Long Island Lutheran HS; Manhattan	Queens, NY
G	5	Juan Felix Rodriguez	6 ft 0 in (1.83 m)	190 lb (86 kg)	RS Jr	Lawrence HS; Monroe JC	Lawrence, MA
G	10	Kaine Roberts	6 ft 2 in (1.88 m)	175 lb (79 kg)	Fr	Santa Margarita Catholic HS	Tokyo, Japan
F	11	Mohamed Diallo	6 ft 6 in (1.98 m)	210 lb (95 kg)	RS Jr	Northeastern JC	Harlem, NY
G	12	Preston Shumpert	6 ft 4 in (1.93 m)	205 lb (93 kg)	Fr	Jamesville-Devitt HS	Syracuse, NY
G	13	Omar Habwe	6 ft 6 in (1.98 m)	225 lb (102 kg)	GS	St. James School; Mount St. Mary's	Lexington, VA
G	14	Tyler Stephenson-Moore	6 ft 3 in (1.91 m)	186 lb (84 kg)	RS So	Long Island Lutheran HS	Jamaica, NY
G	15	Anthony Roberts	6 ft 4 in (1.93 m)	200 lb (91 kg)	RS Jr	Henry Ford HS	Detroit, MI
C	21	Alex Christie	7 ft 0 in (2.13 m)	280 lb (127 kg)	RS Jr	The MacDuffie School	Oakville, Ontario
G	22	Tanahj Pettway	6 ft 2 in (1.88 m)	185 lb (84 kg)	RS So	MacDuffie School; Indian River State College	Worcester, MA
F	23	Jaden Sayles	6 ft 9 in (2.06 m)	235 lb (107 kg)	Sr	Sycamore HS; Akron	Cincinnati, OH
F	24	Payton Shumpert	6 ft 7 in (2.01 m)	205 lb (93 kg)	Fr	Jamesville-Devitt HS	Syracuse, NY

Head coach

- Geno Ford (Ohio)

Assistant coach(es)

- Bryan Weber (Akron)
- Dan Rickard (Stony Brook)
- Jalen Avery (Kent State)

Legend

- (C) Team captain
- (S) Suspended
- (I) Ineligible
- (W) Walk-on
- Injured
- Current redshirt

Roster
Last update: November 16, 2021

== Schedule and results ==
Date time, TV	Rank^{#}	Opponent^{#}	Result	Record	Site (attendance) city, state
Non-conference regular season
November 9, 2021*; 7:00 pm, ESPN+		at George Mason	L 52–74	0–1	EagleBank Arena (4,558); Fairfax, VA
November 18, 2021*; 8:00 pm, ESPN+		at No. 3 Kansas	L 59–88	0–2	Allen Fieldhouse (16,300); Lawrence, KS
November 22, 2021*; 6:30 pm, ESPN3		Sacred Heart; Stony Brook Classic	W 75–72	1–2	Island Federal Credit Union Arena (2,403); Stony Brook, NY
November 24, 2021*; 2:00 pm, ESPN3		at Fairfield; Stony Brook Classic	L 78–83 ^{OT}	1–3	Webster Bank Arena (1,179); Bridgeport, CT
November 28, 2021*; 1:00 pm, NESN		at Yale	W 85–81	2–3	Payne Whitney Gymnasium (568); New Haven, CT
December 1, 2021*; 6:30 pm, ESPN+		American	W 80–57	3–3	Island Federal Credit Union Arena (1,875); Stony Brook, NY
December 4, 2021*; 6:30 pm, SNY		Wagner	L 49–78	3–4	Island Federal Credit Union Arena (2,070); Stony Brook, NY
December 8, 2021*; 6:30 pm, SNY		Hofstra	W 79–62	4–4	Island Federal Credit Union Arena (2,120); Stony Brook, NY
December 11, 2021*; 7:00 pm, SNY		Bryant	W 86–78	5–4	Island Federal Credit Union Arena (1,930); Stony Brook, NY
December 14, 2021*; 6:30 pm, ESPN3		Central Connecticut	W 87–67	6–4	Island Federal Credit Union Arena (1,531); Stony Brook, NY
December 18, 2021*; 6:30 pm, SNY		Saint Peter's	W 64–63	7–4	Island Federal Credit Union Arena (1,539); Stony Brook, NY
December 22, 2021*; 2:00 pm, SECN+		at Florida	L 62–87	7–5	O'Connell Center (8,063); Gainesville, FL
December 29, 2021*; 6:30 pm, SNY		Farmingdale State	W 87–57	8–5	Island Federal Credit Union Arena (1,824); Stony Brook, NY
America East regular season
January 8, 2022; 6:30 pm, ESPN3		Maine	W 80–72	9–5 (1–0)	Island Federal Credit Union Arena (1,551); Stony Brook, NY
January 12, 2022; 7:00 pm, ESPN3		at Vermont	L 65–98	9–6 (1–1)	Patrick Gym (1,929); Burlington, VT
January 17, 2022; 4:00 pm, ESPN3		UMBC; Rescheduled from January 6	W 65–51	10–6 (2–1)	Island Federal Credit Union Arena (1,770); Stony Brook, NY
January 19, 2022; 7:00 pm, ESPN+		at Binghamton	W 74–71	11–6 (3–1)	Binghamton University Events Center (1,201); Vestal, NY
January 22, 2022; 7:00 pm, ESPN3		at Albany	W 86–75	12–6 (4–1)	SEFCU Arena (2,389); Albany, NY
January 26, 2022; 6:30 pm, ESPN+		Vermont	L 67–80	12–7 (4–2)	Island Federal Credit Union Arena (2,504); Stony Brook, NY
January 28, 2022; 5:00 pm, ESPN3		at New Hampshire	W 76–69	13–7 (5–2)	Lundholm Gym (421); Durham, NH
February 2, 2022; 6:30 pm, ESPN3		Binghamton	L 61–77	13–8 (5–3)	Island Federal Credit Union Arena (2,476); Stony Brook, NY
February 5, 2022; 7:00 pm, ESPN3		at NJIT	L 62–65	13–9 (5–4)	Wellness and Events Center (335); Newark, NJ
February 7, 2022; 7:00 pm, ESPN3		New Hampshire; Rescheduled from January 15	L 65–67	13–10 (5–5)	Island Federal Credit Union Arena (1,676); Stony Brook, NY
February 9, 2022; 7:00 pm, ESPN+		UMass Lowell	W 87–85	14–10 (6–5)	Island Federal Credit Union Arena (1,850); Stony Brook, NY
February 13, 2022; 1:00 pm, ESPN+		at Maine	W 85–74	15–10 (7–5)	Cross Insurance Center (573); Bangor, ME
February 16, 2022; 7:00 pm, ESPN+		at UMBC	L 84–95	15–11 (7–6)	Chesapeake Employers Insurance Arena (2,252); Catonsville, MD
February 19, 2022; 6:30 pm, SNY		Hartford	W 88–82	16–11 (8–6)	Island Federal Credit Union Arena (2,471); Stony Brook, NY
February 20, 2022; 2:00 pm, ESPN+		Hartford; Rescheduled from January 2	L 70–74	16–12 (8–7)	Chase Arena at Reich Family Pavilion (342); West Hartford, CT
February 23, 2022; 7:00 pm, ESPN+		at UMass Lowell	L 50–67	16–13 (8–8)	Costello Athletic Center (501); Lowell, MA
February 26, 2022; 6:30 pm, SNY/ESPN3		Albany	W 66–50	17–13 (9–8)	Island Federal Credit Union Arena (3,048); Stony Brook, NY
March 1, 2022; 6:30 pm, ESPN3		NJIT	W 87–68	18–13 (10–8)	Island Federal Credit Union Arena (1,833); Stony Brook, NY
*Non-conference game. ^{#}Rankings from AP Poll. (#) Tournament seedings in parentheses. All times are in Eastern.

== See also ==
- 2021–22 Stony Brook Seawolves women's basketball team
