= 2021–22 UMBC Retrievers men's basketball team =

American college basketball season

2021–22 UMBC Retrievers men's basketball
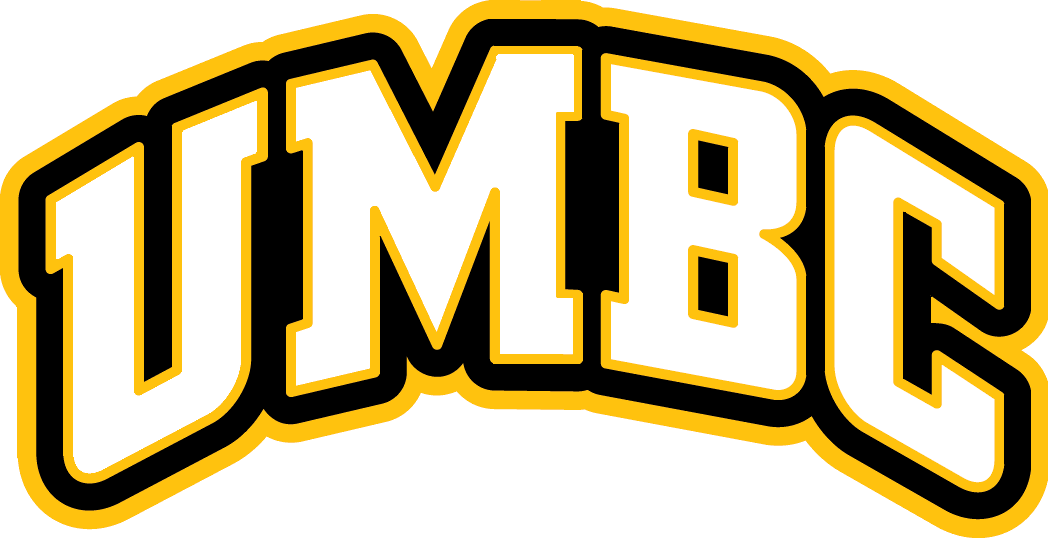

The Basketball Classic, First Round
- Conference: America East Conference
- Record: 18–14 (11–7 America East)
- Head coach: Jim Ferry (1st season)
- Assistant coaches: Danny Lawson; Josh Pelletier; Evann BaKer
- Home arena: Chesapeake Employers Insurance Arena

2021–22 America East Conference men's basketball standings
	Conf.				Overall
Team	W		L	PCT	W		L	PCT
Vermont †	17	–	1	.944	28	–	6	.824
UMBC	11	–	7	.611	18	–	14	.563
Stony Brook*	10	–	8	.556	18	–	13	.581
New Hampshire	10	–	8	.556	15	–	13	.536
Hartford	9	–	9	.500	12	–	20	.375
Albany	9	–	9	.500	13	–	18	.419
Binghamton	8	–	10	.444	12	–	17	.414
UMass Lowell	7	–	11	.389	15	–	16	.484
NJIT	6	–	12	.333	11	–	18	.379
Maine	3	–	15	.167	6	–	23	.207
† 2022 AmEast tournament winner *Ineligible for the 2022 AmEast tournament due to changing conferences in 2022

The 2021–22 UMBC Retrievers men's basketball team represented the University of Maryland, Baltimore County in the 2021–22 NCAA Division I men's basketball season. The Retrievers, led by first-year head coach Jim Ferry, played their home games at the Chesapeake Employers Insurance Arena in Catonsville, Maryland as members of the America East Conference. They finished the season 18–14, 11–7 in America East Play to finish in 2nd place. They defeated UMass Lowell and Hartford to advance to the championship game of the America East tournament where they lost to Vermont. They received an invitation to The Basketball Classic where they withdrew due to UMBC having health concerns.

== Previous season ==
In a season limited due to the ongoing COVID-19 pandemic, the Retrievers finished the 2020–21 season 14–6, 10–4 in America East play to finish in a tie for first place. They lost to UMass Lowell in the semifinals of the America East tournament.

Following the season, head coach Ryan Odom left the school to accept the head coaching position at Utah State. On April 12, 2021, the school named former Duquesne and Penn State head coach Jim Ferry as the team's new head coach.

== Roster ==
2021–22 UMBC Retrievers men's basketball team
Players
Coaches

Pos.	#	Name	Height	Weight	Year	Hometown
G	0	Keondre Kennedy	6 ft 6 in (1.98 m)	180 lb (82 kg)	Sr	Atlanta, Georgia
G	1	L.J. Owens	6 ft 3 in (1.91 m)	165 lb (75 kg)	Sr	Annapolis, Maryland
G/F	2	Tre Edwards	6 ft 7 in (2.01 m)	195 lb (88 kg)	So	Hamilton, Ontario
G	3	Hakim Byrd	5 ft 10 in (1.78 m)	155 lb (70 kg)	So	Philadelphia, Pennsylvania
G	4	Ray Salnave	6 ft 3 in (1.91 m)	210 lb (95 kg)	Sr	Elmont, New York
G	5	Darnell Rogers	5 ft 2 in (1.57 m)	150 lb (68 kg)	Sr	Baltimore, Maryland
F	10	Szymon Wojcik	6 ft 9 in (2.06 m)	220 lb (100 kg)	Sr	Wrocław, Poland
G	14	Kenny Sumpter	6 ft 3 in (1.91 m)	190 lb (86 kg)	Sr	Havre de Grace, Maryland
F	15	Yaw Obeng-Mensah	6 ft 7 in (2.01 m)	207 lb (94 kg)	Jr	Toronto, Ontario
G	20	JC Harris	6 ft 1 in (1.85 m)	170 lb (77 kg)	Fr	Gaithersburg, Maryland
F	21	Anyang Garang	6 ft 9 in (2.06 m)	210 lb (95 kg)	So	Adelaide, Australia
G	24	Brendan Davis	6 ft 0 in (1.83 m)	160 lb (73 kg)	So	Annapolis, Maryland
F	25	Nathan Johnson	6 ft 7 in (2.01 m)	205 lb (93 kg)	Jr	Adel, Iowa
F	32	Dimitrije Spasojevic	6 ft 9 in (2.06 m)	240 lb (109 kg)	Sr	Vršac, Serbia
G	34	Matteo Picarelli	6 ft 2 in (1.88 m)	180 lb (82 kg)	So	Milan, Italy
G	41	Jacob Boonyasith	6 ft 3 in (1.91 m)	215 lb (98 kg)	Sr	Grand Rapids, Michigan

Head coach

- Jim Ferry (Keene State)

Assistant coach(es)

- Danny Lawson (Bentley)
- Josh Pelletier (Saint Rose)
- Evann Baker (Quinnipiac)

Legend

- (C) Team captain
- (S) Suspended
- (I) Ineligible
- (W) Walk-on
- Injured
- Current redshirt

Roster
Last update: January 14, 2022

== Schedule and results ==
Date time, TV	Rank^{#}	Opponent^{#}	Result	Record	Site (attendance) city, state
Non-conference regular season
November 9, 2021*; 7:30 pm, NESN+/ESPN+		at UMass	L 60–77	0–1	Mullins Center (2,903); Amherst, MA
November 15, 2021*; 7:00 pm		Penn State York	W 85–47	1–1	Chesapeake Employers Insurance Arena (1,411); Catonsville, MD
November 19, 2021*; 7:30 pm, ESPN+		vs. Western Carolina; Lancer Classic	W 91–75	2–1	Willett Hall (174); Farmville, VA
November 20, 2021*; 5:00 pm, ESPN+		at Longwood; Lancer Classic	L 55–82	2–2	Willett Hall (1,512); Farmville, VA
November 23, 2021*; 7:00 pm, MASN		American	W 98–67	3–2	Chesapeake Employers Insurance Arena (2,051); Catonsville, MD
November 27, 2021*; 3:00 pm, ACCNX		at Pittsburgh	W 87–77	4–2	Petersen Events Center (7,400); Pittsburgh, PA
December 1, 2021*; 7:00 pm, ESPN3		Columbia	W 98–60	5–2	Chesapeake Employers Insurance Arena (1,813); Catonsville, MD
December 5, 2021*; 2:00 pm, FloSports		at Delaware	L 60–70	5–3	Bob Carpenter Center (1,434); Newark, DE
December 8, 2021*; 8:30 pm, FS1		at Georgetown	L 71–100	5–4	Capital One Arena (3,021); Washington, D.C.
December 13, 2021*; 6:00 pm, ESPN+		at Princeton	L 77–89	5–5	Jadwin Gymnasium (891); Princeton, NJ
December 16, 2021*; 7:00 pm, ESPN3		UNC Greensboro	L 51–62	5–6	Chesapeake Employers Insurance Arena (1,162); Catonsville, MD
December 22, 2021*; 7:00 pm, NEC Front Row		at Mount St. Mary's	Canceled due to COVID-19 issues		Knott Arena; Emmitsburg, MD
December 29, 2021*; 7:00 pm, ESPN3		Radford	Canceled due to COVID-19 issues		Chesapeake Employers Insurance Arena; Catonsville, MD
America East Conference regular season
January 8, 2022; 5:30 pm, ESPN3		UMass Lowell	L 64–66	5–7 (0–1)	Chesapeake Employers Insurance Arena (923); Catonsville, MD
January 12, 2022; 7:00 pm, ESPN+		at NJIT	W 76–56	6–7 (1–1)	Wellness and Events Center (278); Newark, NJ
January 15, 2022; 1:00 pm, ESPN3		Vermont	L 69–86	6–8 (1–2)	Chesapeake Employers Insurance Arena (1,028); Catonsville, MD
January 17, 2022; 4:00 pm, ESPN3		at Stony Brook; Rescheduled from January 6	L 51–65	6–9 (1–3)	Island Federal Credit Union Arena (1,770); Stony Brook, NY
January 19, 2022; 7:00 pm, ESPN3		Albany	L 54–66	6–10 (1–4)	Chesapeake Employers Insurance Arena (817); Catonsville, MD
January 22, 2022; 1:00 pm, ESPN3		at Maine	W 88–46	7–10 (2–4)	Cross Insurance Center (656); Bangor, ME
January 26, 2022; 7:00 pm, ESPN+		NJIT	W 73–69	8–10 (3–4)	Chesapeake Employers Insurance Arena (1,207); Catonsville, MD
January 29, 2022; 2:00 pm, ESPN3		at Binghamton	W 70–68	9–10 (4–4)	Binghamton University Events Center (2,113); Vestal, NY
February 2, 2022; 7:00 pm, ESPN+		at Albany	W 59–53	10–10 (5–4)	SEFCU Arena (1,648); Albany, NY
February 5, 2022; 5:30 pm, ESPN3		New Hampshire	W 88–77	11–10 (6–4)	Chesapeake Employers Insurance Arena (1,935); Catonsville, MD
February 9, 2022; 7:00 pm, ESPN+		Hartford	W 68–64	12–10 (7–4)	Chesapeake Employers Insurance Arena (1,287); Catonsville, MD
February 12, 2022; 5:00 pm, ESPN3		at UMass Lowell	L 71–88	12–11 (7–5)	Tsongas Center (2,215); Lowell, MA
February 14, 2022; 4:00 pm, ESPN+		at New Hampshire; Rescheduled from January 2	L 62–68	12–12 (7–6)	Lundholm Gym (382); Durham, NH
February 16, 2022; 7:00 pm, ESPN+		Stony Brook	W 95–84	13–12 (8–6)	Chesapeake Employers Insurance Arena (2,252); Catonsville, MD
February 19, 2022; 12:00 pm, ESPN3		at Vermont	L 59–86	13–13 (8–7)	Patrick Gym (2,645); Burlington, VT
February 23, 2022; 7:00 pm, ESPN+		at Hartford	W 92–85	14–13 (9–7)	Chase Arena at Reich Family Pavilion (362); West Hartford, CT
February 26, 2022; 1:00 pm, ESPN3		Maine	W 93–79	15–13 (10–7)	Chesapeake Employers Insurance Arena (1,714); Catonsville, MD
March 1, 2022; 7:00 pm, ESPN+		Binghamton	W 78–68	16–13 (11–7)	Chesapeake Employers Insurance Arena (2,712); Catonsville, MD
America East tournament
March 6, 2022; 1:00 pm, ESPN+	(2)	(7) UMass Lowell; Quarterfinals	W 93–85 ^{OT}	17–13	Chesapeake Employers Insurance Arena (1,925); Catonsville, MD
March 9, 2022; 7:00 pm, ESPN+	(2)	(4) Hartford; Semifinals	W 80–60	18–13	Chesapeake Employers Insurance Arena (3,249); Catonsville, MD
March 12, 2022; 11:00 am, ESPN2	(2)	at (1) Vermont; Championship	L 43–82	18–14	Patrick Gym; Burlington, VT
The Basketball Classic
March 16, 2022; 7:30 pm, ESPN+		Merrimack; First Round	Canceled due to UMBC withdrawing for health concerns		Chesapeake Employers Insurance Arena; Catonsville, MD
*Non-conference game. ^{#}Rankings from AP Poll. (#) Tournament seedings in parentheses. All times are in Eastern.
