= 2021–22 Albany Great Danes men's basketball team =

American college basketball season

2021–22 Albany Great Danes men's basketball
- Conference: America East Conference
- Record: 13–18 (9–9 America East)
- Head coach: Dwayne Killings (1st season)
- Assistant coaches: Hamlet Tibbs; Matt Griffin; Dannton Jackson
- Home arena: SEFCU Arena

2021–22 America East Conference men's basketball standings
	Conf.				Overall
Team	W		L	PCT	W		L	PCT
Vermont †	17	–	1	.944	28	–	6	.824
UMBC	11	–	7	.611	18	–	14	.563
Stony Brook*	10	–	8	.556	18	–	13	.581
New Hampshire	10	–	8	.556	15	–	13	.536
Hartford	9	–	9	.500	12	–	20	.375
Albany	9	–	9	.500	13	–	18	.419
Binghamton	8	–	10	.444	12	–	17	.414
UMass Lowell	7	–	11	.389	15	–	16	.484
NJIT	6	–	12	.333	11	–	18	.379
Maine	3	–	15	.167	6	–	23	.207
† 2022 AmEast tournament winner *Ineligible for the 2022 AmEast tournament due to changing conferences in 2022

The 2021–22 Albany Great Danes men's basketball team represented the University at Albany, SUNY in the 2021–22 NCAA Division I men's basketball season. They were led by first-year head coach Dwayne Killings and played their home games at the SEFCU Arena in Albany, New York as members of the America East Conference. They finished 13–18, 9–9 in America East play, to finish a tie for fifth place. They lost in the quarterfinals of the America East tournament to Hartford.

== Previous season ==
In a season limited due to the ongoing COVID-19 pandemic, the Great Danes finished the 2020–21 season 7–9, 6–6 in America East play, to finish in fifth place. They defeated NJIT in the first round of the America East tournament, before losing to Hartford in the quarterfinals.

On March 1, 2021 head coach Will Brown announced in a press release that he and the school agreed to part ways, ending Brown's 20-year tenure with the team. On March 17, the school announced that they had hired Marquette associate head coach Dwayne Killings to be the Great Danes' next head coach.

== Roster ==
2021–22 Albany Great Danes men's basketball team
Players
Coaches

Pos.	#	Name	Height	Weight	Year	Previous school	Hometown
G	0	Ny'Mire Little	6 ft 4 in (1.93 m)	203 lb (92 kg)	Fr	Westtown School	Chester, PA
G	1	Will Amica	6 ft 0 in (1.83 m)	170 lb (77 kg)	So	West Genesee HS	Syracuse, NY
F	2	De'Vondre Perry	6 ft 7 in (2.01 m)	200 lb (91 kg)	GS	Temple	Baltimore, MD
G/F	3	Trey Hutcheson	6 ft 5 in (1.96 m)	195 lb (88 kg)	Jr	Linn-Mar HS	Marion, IA
F	4	Jarvis Doles	6 ft 9 in (2.06 m)	215 lb (98 kg)	GS	Drexel	Baltimore, MD
G	5	Jamel Horton	6 ft 4 in (1.93 m)	190 lb (86 kg)	Sr	Pratt CC	Queens, NY
F	10	Aaron Reddish	6 ft 7 in (2.01 m)	185 lb (84 kg)	Fr	Pebblebrook HS	Norristown, PA
F	11	Tairi Ketner	6 ft 7 in (2.01 m)	263 lb (119 kg)	Fr	Woodstock Academy	South Philadelphia, PA
F	12	Justin Neely	6 ft 5 in (1.96 m)	200 lb (91 kg)	Fr	West Oaks Academy	Miami, FL
G/F	13	Gerald Drumgoole	6 ft 5 in (1.96 m)	214 lb (97 kg)	Jr	Pittsburgh	Rochester, NY
G	20	Matt Cerruti	6 ft 4 in (1.93 m)	190 lb (86 kg)	GS	Lock Haven	Huntingdon Valley, PA
G/F	23	Sam Shafer	6 ft 6 in (1.98 m)	200 lb (91 kg)	RS Jr	Southern Illinois	Frankfort, IL
C	24	Paul Newman	6 ft 9 in (2.06 m)	225 lb (102 kg)	GS	Bucknell	Philadelphia, PA
G	25	Luke Fizulich	6 ft 2 in (1.88 m)	185 lb (84 kg)	So	Marquette	Harrington Park, NJ
G	30	Chuck Champion	6 ft 4 in (1.93 m)	185 lb (84 kg)	GS	Loyola (MD)	Philadelphia, PA

Head coach

- Dwayne Killings (Hampton)

Assistant coach(es)

- Hamlet Tibbs (West Virginia)
- Matt Griffin (Boston University)
- Dannton Jackson (Xavier)

Legend

- (C) Team captain
- (S) Suspended
- (I) Ineligible
- (W) Walk-on
- Injured
- Current redshirt

Roster
Last update: October 24, 2021

== Schedule and results ==
Date time, TV	Rank^{#}	Opponent^{#}	Result	Record	Site (attendance) city, state
Non-conference regular season
November 9, 2021*; 7:00 p.m., ESPN3		Towson	L 56–77	0–1	SEFCU Arena (4,215); Albany, NY
November 13, 2021*; 4:00 p.m., ESPN+		at La Salle	L 64–67	0–2	Tom Gola Arena (3,047); Philadelphia, PA
November 17, 2021*; 7:00 p.m., ESPN+		Harvard	L 53–60	0–3	SEFCU Arena (2,684); Albany, NY
November 20, 2021*; 7:30 p.m., ESPN+		at Eastern Kentucky; Eastern Kentucky Invitational	L 64–77	0–4	McBrayer Arena (2,251); Richmond, KY
November 22, 2021*; 7:00 p.m., ESPN+		at No. 10т Kentucky	L 61–86	0–5	Rupp Arena (18,201); Lexington, KY
November 24, 2021*		vs. Eastern Illinois; Eastern Kentucky Invitational	W 64–62	1–5	McBrayer Arena (100); Richmond, KY
December 1, 2021*; 7:00 p.m.		at Kansas State	L 43–71	1–6	Bramlage Coliseum (5,195); Manhattan, KS
December 7, 2021*		at Yale	L 52–71	1–7	John J. Lee Amphitheater (777); New Haven, CT
December 11, 2021*; 7:00 p.m.		Columbia	W 60–59	2–7	SEFCU Arena (2,245); Albany, NY
December 13, 2021*; 8:00 p.m.		at Boston College	W 61–57	3–7	Conte Forum (3,872); Chestnut Hill, MA
December 18, 2021*; 2:00 p.m.		vs. Niagara	L 58–66	3–8	KeyBank Center; Buffalo, NY
December 21, 2021*; 7:00 p.m.		at Lehigh	W 68–52	4–8	Stabler Arena (602); Bethlehem, PA
December 29, 2021*; 7:00 p.m.		Bucknell	Canceled due to COVID-19 issues		SEFCU Arena; Albany, NY
America East Conference regular season
January 6, 2022; 7:00 p.m., ESPN3		Binghamton	L 79–88	4–9 (0–1)	SEFCU Arena (1,067); Albany, NY
January 8, 2022; 12:00 p.m., ESPN3		at New Hampshire	L 62–64	4–10 (0–2)	Lundholm Gym (339); Durham, NH
January 12, 2022; 7:00 p.m., ESPN3		UMass Lowell	W 57–47	5–10 (1–2)	SEFCU Arena (1,164); Albany, NY
January 15, 2022; 4:00 p.m., ESPN3		NJIT	W 71–56	6–10 (2–2)	SEFCU Arena (1,225); Albany, NY
January 19, 2022; 7:00 p.m., ESPN3		at UMBC	W 66–54	7–10 (3–2)	Chesapeake Employers Insurance Arena (817); Catonsville, MD
January 22, 2022; 7:00 p.m., ESPN3		Stony Brook	L 75–86	7–11 (3–3)	SEFCU Arena (2,389); Albany, NY
January 26, 2022; 7:00 p.m., ESPN+		at UMass Lowell	W 64–62 ^{OT}	8–11 (4–3)	Costello Athletic Center (455); Lowell, MA
January 29, 2022; 7:00 p.m., ESPN3		at NJIT	W 64–53	9–11 (5–3)	Wellness and Events Center (229); Newark, NJ
January 31, 2022; 7:00 p.m., ESPN+		at Vermont; Rescheduled from January 2	L 61–73	9–12 (5–4)	Patrick Gym (2,096); Burlington, VT
February 2, 2022; 7:00 p.m., ESPN+		UMBC	L 53–59	9–13 (5–5)	SEFCU Arena (1,648); Albany, NY
February 5, 2022; 7:00 p.m., ESPN3		at Hartford	W 71–52	10–13 (6–5)	Chase Arena (245); West Hartford, CT
February 9, 2022; 7:00 p.m., ESPN+		Maine	L 63–73	10–14 (6–6)	SEFCU Arena (1,544); Albany, NY
February 12, 2022; 7:00 p.m., ESPN3		Vermont	L 63–76	10–15 (6–7)	SEFCU Arena (2,403); Albany, NY
February 16, 2022; 7:00 p.m., ESPN+		at Binghamton	W 68–67	11–15 (7–7)	Binghamton University Events Center (3,835); Vestal, NY
February 19, 2022; 4:00 p.m., ESPN3		New Hampshire	W 70–65	12–15 (8–7)	SEFCU Arena (2,208); Albany, NY
February 23, 2022; 7:00 p.m., ESPN3		at Maine	W 72–68	13–15 (9–7)	Memorial Gymnasium (581); Orono, ME
February 26, 2022; 6:30 p.m., ESPN3		at Stony Brook	L 50–66	13–16 (9–8)	Island Federal Arena (3,048); Stony Brook, NY
March 1, 2022; 7:00 p.m., ESPN+		Hartford	L 55–67	13–17 (9–9)	SEFCU Arena (1,803); Albany, NY
America East tournament
March 6, 2022; 2:00 p.m., ESPN+	(5)	at (4) Hartford; Quarterfinals	L 49–61	13–18	Chase Arena (663); West Hartford, CT
*Non-conference game. ^{#}Rankings from AP poll. (#) Tournament seedings in parentheses. All times are in Eastern.
