= Jai Steadman =

College basketball coach

Current position
- Team: Independence CC
- Conference: KJCCC
- Record: 0-0

Biographical details
- Education: University of Nebraska–Lincoln

Coaching career (HC unless noted)
- 1999–2002: Tyler JC
- 2002–2003: TCU (asst)
- 2002–2003: McNeese State (asst)
- 2005–2006: North Texas (asst)
- 2006–2007: Fort Worth Flyers
- 2007–2009: Louisiana-Lafayette (asst)
- 2009–2012: Rio Grande Valley Vipers (asst)
- 2012–2013: Bellevue University (asst)
- 2014–2021: UTPA/UTRGV
- 2021: UTRGV (interim)
- 2021–2022: Maine (asst)
- 2022: Maine (interim)
- 2022–2023: Rio Grande Valley Vipers (asst)
- 2023–present: Independence Community College

Jai Steadman is an American college basketball coach. He is the current coach of Independence Community College in Lawrence, Kansas, a position he has held since 2023.

== Early life ==
Jason Steadman was born in Geneva, Nebraska. He went to college at the University of Nebraska–Lincoln, where he was an administrative assistant.

== International career ==
After having coached Tyler Junior College and TCU in 2002, Steadman coached the Randers Cimbria in Denmark, where he went 8th in the Basketligaen, lost in the league semi finals, and coached all league second teamer Mark Collins.

== D-League stint ==
=== Fort Worth Flyers ===
In 2006, Steadman was named assistant coach for the Fort Worth Flyers. There, they made the D-League finals, but lost to the Albuquerque Thunderbirds and coached future Houston Rockets head coach Ime Udoka.

=== Rio Grande Valley Vipers ===
In 2009, Steadman was named assistant coach for the Rio Grande Valley Vipers, the Houston Rockets D-League affiliate. That year, led by D-League MVP Mike Harris, and D-League Coach of the Year Chris Finch, the Vipers won their first D-League championship off of a last-second buzzer-beater. The next year, led by All D-League first teamer Jeff Adrien, made it to the finals, but lost to the Iowa Energy.

Steadman returned to the Vipers in 2022.

== Later career ==
=== University of Texas Rio Grande Valley Vaqueros ===
After parting ways with Bellevue University, Steadman was named assistant head coach of the Vaqueros on Sept. 24, 2014. In the 20-21 season, Steadman was named the best assistant coach of the Western Athletic Conference. Following the death of head coach Lew Hill midway through the season, Steadman became the interim head coach for the remainder of the season.

=== Maine Black Bears ===
Steadman was announced assistant head coach on Feb. 17, 2022. When head coach Richard Barron parted ways with the team midway through the season, he was elevated to interim head coach.

=== Independence CC ===
Steadman was named head coach of the Pirates in 2023.

== Personal life ==
Steadman was adopted early in his life to Caucasian parents. They knew he was Native American, but did not know his tribe. Steadman tried to find out his roots in 2009. There, he found his mother was Ponca, and her brother was first chairman of the restored Ponca tribe. Steadman decided to change his name from Jason to Jai (meaning victory in a native language).

== Head coaching record ==
Record table
Season	Team	Overall	Conference	Standing	Postseason
Texas–Rio Grande Valley Vaqueros (Western Athletic Conference) (2021)
2021–2022	Texas–Rio Grande Valley	1–6	Western Athletic Conference	8th	
Maine Black Bears (America East Conference) (2022)
2020–2021	Maine	1–3	America East Conference	10th	
Total:		2–9 (.182)			
National champion Postseason invitational champion Conference regular season champion Conference regular season and conference tournament champion Division regular season champion Division regular season and conference tournament champion Conference tournament champion
