= 2021–22 Hartford Hawks men's basketball team =

American college basketball season

2021–22 Hartford Hawks men's basketball
- Conference: America East Conference
- Record: 12–20 (9–9 America East)
- Head coach: John Gallagher (12th season)
- Assistant coaches: Tom Devitt; Yolonzo Moore II; Tim Brooks
- Home arena: Chase Arena

2021–22 America East Conference men's basketball standings
	Conf.				Overall
Team	W		L	PCT	W		L	PCT
Vermont †	17	–	1	.944	28	–	6	.824
UMBC	11	–	7	.611	18	–	14	.563
Stony Brook*	10	–	8	.556	18	–	13	.581
New Hampshire	10	–	8	.556	15	–	13	.536
Hartford	9	–	9	.500	12	–	20	.375
Albany	9	–	9	.500	13	–	18	.419
Binghamton	8	–	10	.444	12	–	17	.414
UMass Lowell	7	–	11	.389	15	–	16	.484
NJIT	6	–	12	.333	11	–	18	.379
Maine	3	–	15	.167	6	–	23	.207
† 2022 AmEast tournament winner *Ineligible for the 2022 AmEast tournament due to changing conferences in 2022

The 2021–22 Hartford Hawks men's basketball team represented the University of Hartford in the 2021–22 NCAA Division I men's basketball season. The Hawks, led by 12th-year head coach John Gallagher, played their home games at Chase Arena in West Hartford, Connecticut as members of the America East Conference.

The Hawks finished the season 12–20, 9–9 in America East play, to finish a tie for fifth place. They defeated fellow fifth seed Albany in the quarterfinals of the America East tournament before losing in the semifinals to second seed UMBC.

== Previous season ==
In a season limited due to the ongoing COVID-19 pandemic, the Hawks finished the 2020–21 season 15–9, 8–6 in America East play, to finish in fourth place. They defeated Binghamton, Albany and Vermont to advance to the championship game of the America East tournament. There they defeated UMass Lowell to receive the conference's automatic bid the NCAA tournament, the school's first-ever appearance in the tournament. As the No. 16 seed in the South Region, they lost to eventual national champion Baylor in the first round.

== Roster ==
2021–22 Hartford Hawks men's basketball team
Players
Coaches

Pos.	#	Name	Height	Weight	Year	Previous school	Hometown
F	0	Hunter Marks	6 ft 9 in (2.06 m)	190 lb (86 kg)	GS	Wonthaggi Secondary College	Phillip Island, Australia
G	2	D.J. Mitchell	6 ft 0 in (1.83 m)	160 lb (73 kg)	Sr	St. Thomas More School	Englewood Cliffs, NJ
G/F	3	David Shriver	6 ft 6 in (1.98 m)	220 lb (100 kg)	Sr	Alderson Broaddus	Philippi, WV
G	4	Moses Flowers	6 ft 3 in (1.91 m)	180 lb (82 kg)	Jr	Thayer Academy	Dorchester, MA
G	5	Kurtis Henderson	5 ft 10 in (1.78 m)	180 lb (82 kg)	Fr	Catholic Memorial School	Brockton, MA
G	11	Briggs McClain	6 ft 4 in (1.93 m)	175 lb (79 kg)	So	St. Maria Goretti HS	Martinsburg, WV
G	13	Dejuan Clayton	6 ft 2 in (1.88 m)	185 lb (84 kg)	GS	Coppin State	Bowie, MD
F	15	Thomas Webley	6 ft 10 in (2.08 m)	240 lb (109 kg)	So	Cashmere HS	Christchurch, New Zealand
G	20	Austin Williams	6 ft 4 in (1.93 m)	200 lb (91 kg)	Sr	Marist	Roseland, NJ
G	21	Matt Hobbs	6 ft 4 in (1.93 m)	200 lb (91 kg)	Sr	New England	Anchorage, AK
G	22	Carlos Edmundo	6 ft 2 in (1.88 m)	180 lb (82 kg)	Jr	Piscataway HS	Piscataway, NJ
G	23	Michael Dunne	6 ft 4 in (1.93 m)	190 lb (86 kg)	Sr	Matawan Regional HS	Matawan, NJ
F	24	Jared Kimbrough	6 ft 8 in (2.03 m)	225 lb (102 kg)	Sr	La Salle	Neptune, NJ
C	45	Pierre Sow	7 ft 0 in (2.13 m)	235 lb (107 kg)	Sr	Hampton	Teaneck, NJ

Head coach

- John Gallagher (Saint Joseph's)

Assistant coach(es)

- Tom Devitt (Boston College)
- Yolonzo Moore II (Hartford)
- Tim Brooks (James Madison)

Legend

- (C) Team captain
- (S) Suspended
- (I) Ineligible
- (W) Walk-on
- Injured
- Current redshirt

Roster
Last update: May 28, 2021

== Schedule and results ==
Date time, TV	Rank^{#}	Opponent^{#}	Result	Record	Site (attendance) city, state
Non-conference regular season
November 9, 2021*; 7:00 p.m.		at Wagner	L 59–77	0–1	Spiro Sports Center (1,924); Staten Island, NY
November 11, 2021*; 1:30 p.m., ACCNX		vs. Campbell; Duke Veterans Day Weekend Showcase	L 67–68	0–2	Cameron Indoor Stadium; Durham, NC
November 13, 2021*; 2:30 p.m., ACCNX		vs. Army; Duke Veterans Day Weekend Showcase	L 79–86	0–3	Cameron Indoor Stadium; Durham, NC
November 18, 2021*; 7:00 p.m., ESPN3		Boston University	L 70–75	0–4	Chase Arena (1,208); West Hartford, CT
November 23, 2021*; 7:00 p.m.		at Merrimack	L 60–75	0–5	Hammel Court (575); North Andover, MA
November 29, 2021*; 6:30 p.m., ESPN+		at Appalachian State	L 59–69	0–6	Holmes Center (1,259); Boone, NC
December 1, 2021*; 7:30 p.m., ESPN+		at Winthrop	L 75–82	0–7	Winthrop Coliseum (950); Rock Hill, SC
December 5, 2021*; 2:00 p.m.		at St. Francis Brooklyn	W 68–55	1–7	Daniel J. Lynch Gym (300); Brooklyn, NY
December 11, 2021*; 3:00 p.m.		at UNLV	L 78–95	1–8	Thomas & Mack Center (3,257); Paradise, NV
December 14, 2021*; 7:00 p.m., ESPN3		Saint Francis (PA); Jack Phelan Classic	L 66–81	1–9	Chase Arena (667); West Hartford, CT
December 18, 2021*; 1:00 p.m.		at Central Connecticut; Rivalry	L 65–75	1–10	William H. Detrick Gymnasium (1,218); New Britain, CT
December 22, 2021*; 11:00 a.m.		at Sacred Heart	W 78–71	2–10	William H. Pitt Center (434); Fairfield, CT
December 28, 2021*; 2:00 p.m., ESPN+		at Cornell	Canceled due to COVID-19 issues		Newman Arena; Ithaca, NY
America East regular season
January 19, 2022; 7:00 p.m., ESPN+		New Hampshire	W 69–57	3–10 (1–0)	Chase Arena (374); West Hartford, CT
January 22, 2022; 7:00 p.m., ESPN3		at Vermont	L 72–82	3–11 (1–1)	Patrick Gym (2,519); Burlington, VT
January 24, 2022; 7:30 p.m., ESPN+		at Binghamton; Rescheduled from January 12	L 64–74	3–12 (1–2)	Binghamton University Events Center (1,525); Vestal, NY
January 26, 2022; 7:00 p.m., ESPN+		Binghamton	W 72–60	4–12 (2–2)	Chase Arena (289); West Hartford, CT
January 31, 2022; 7:00 p.m., ESPN+		at Maine; Rescheduled from January 6	W 78–66	5–12 (3–2)	Cross Insurance Center (533); Bangor, ME
February 2, 2022; 7:00 p.m., ESPN+		at New Hampshire	L 64–70	5–13 (3–3)	Lundholm Gym (383); Durham, NH
February 5, 2022; 7:00 p.m., ESPN3		Albany	L 52–71	5–14 (3–4)	Chase Arena (245); West Hartford, CT
February 7, 2022; 6:00 p.m., ESPN3		at UMass Lowell; Rescheduled from January 15	L 75–85	5–15 (3–5)	Costello Athletic Center (397); Lowell, MA
February 9, 2022; 7:00 p.m., ESPN+		at UMBC	L 64–68	5–16 (3–6)	Chesapeake Employers Insurance Arena (1,287); Catonsville, MD
February 12, 2022; 7:00 p.m., ESPN3		at NJIT	W 65–49	6–16 (4–6)	Wellness and Events Center (541); Newark, NJ
February 14, 2022; 7:00 p.m., ESPN3		Vermont; Rescheduled from January 8	W 75–74 ^{OT}	7–16 (5–6)	Chase Arena (390); West Hartford, CT
February 16, 2022; 7:00 p.m., ESPN+		Maine	W 75–65	8–16 (6–6)	Chase Arena (502); West Hartford, CT
February 19, 2022; 6:30 p.m., ESPN3		at Stony Brook	L 82–88	8–17 (6–7)	Island Federal Arena (2,471); Stony Brook, NY
February 20, 2022; 5:00 p.m., ESPN+		Stony Brook; Rescheduled from January 2	W 74–70	9–17 (7–7)	Chase Arena (342); West Hartford, CT
February 23, 2022; 7:00 p.m., ESPN+		UMBC	L 85–92	9–18 (7–8)	Chase Arena (362); West Hartford, CT
February 26, 2022; 2:00 p.m., ESPN3		NJIT	W 83–62	10–18 (8–8)	Chase Arena (518); West Hartford, CT
March 1, 2022; 7:00 p.m., ESPN+		at Albany	W 67–55	11–18 (9–8)	SEFCU Arena (1,803); Albany, NY
March 3, 2022; 7:00 p.m., ESPN3		UMass Lowell; Rescheduled from January 29	L 73–83	11–19 (9–9)	Chase Arena (436); West Hartford, CT
America East tournament
March 6, 2022; 2:00 p.m., ESPN+	(4)	(5) Albany; Quarterfinals	W 61–49	12–19	Chase Arena (663); West Hartford, CT
March 9, 2022; 7:00 p.m., ESPN+	(4)	at (2) UMBC; Semifinals	L 60–80	12–20	Chesapeake Employers Insurance Arena (3,249); Catonsville, MD
*Non-conference game. ^{#}Rankings from AP poll. (#) Tournament seedings in parentheses. All times are in Eastern.
