= Finn Sullivan =

American basketball player

Personal information
- Listed height: 6 ft 4 in (1.93 m)
- Listed weight: 210 lb (95 kg)

Career information
- High school: Torrey Pines (San Diego, California)
- College: San Diego (2018–2021); Vermont (2021–2023)
- NBA draft: 2023: undrafted
- Position: Point guard / shooting guard

Career highlights
- America East Player of the Year (2023); First-team All-America East (2023)

Finn Sullivan is an American basketball player who recently completed his college career for the Vermont Catamounts of the America East Conference. He previously played for the San Diego Toreros. Sullivan played for former NBA player John Olive at Torrey Pines High School in San Diego and committed to the University of San Diego as a part of new coach Sam Scholl's first recruiting class. Sullivan played three seasons for the Toreros. He averaged 6 points in 74 games for the Toreros.

Sullivan then transferred to Vermont where he provided reliable outside shooting to the defense-oriented Catamounts. In taking advantage of an extra year of eligibility offered by the NCAA to athletes playing during the COVID pandemic, Sullivan returned to Vermont for a fifth season. He averaged a career-best 11.7 points per game, displaying a strong overall floor game (4.9 rebounds and 2.4 assists per game) and leading the Catamounts to America East regular-season and tournament championships. At the close of his final year of eligibility, Sullivan was named first-team All-America East Conference and the America East Player of the Year.

== Career statistics ==
Legend
GP	Games played	GS	Games started	MPG	Minutes per game
FG%	Field goal percentage	3P%	3-point field goal percentage	FT%	Free throw percentage
RPG	Rebounds per game	APG	Assists per game	SPG	Steals per game
BPG	Blocks per game	PPG	Points per game	**Bold**	Career high

=== College ===
Year	Team	GP	GS	MPG	FG%	3P%	FT%	RPG	APG	SPG	BPG	PPG
2018–19	San Diego	**32**	1	16.4	.394	.333	**.833**	1.9	.5	.5	.2	4.1
2019–20	San Diego	28	4	23.5	.387	.269	.621	2.4	1.8	1.0	.3	7.6
2020–21	San Diego	14	13	27.2	.391	**.370**	.800	2.3	**2.7**	**1.1**	.4	6.9
2021–22	Vermont	**32**	23	24.3	.415	.346	.788	3.3	2.0	1.0	.5	7.2
2022–23	Vermont	**32**	**32**	**29.1**	**.424**	.319	.727	**4.9**	2.4	1.2	**.8**	**11.7**
Career		138	73	23.7	.407	.321	.727	3.1	1.8	.9	.4	7.6
