= Dwayne Killings =

American basketball coach (born 1981)

Current position
- Title: Head coach
- Team: Albany
- Conference: America East
- Record: 66–100 (.398)

Biographical details
- Born: April 4, 1981 (age 45); Amherst, Massachusetts, U.S.

Playing career
- 1999–2001: UMass
- 2001–2003: Hampton

Coaching career (HC unless noted)
- 2003–2006: Charlotte Hornets (special asst.)
- 2010–2011: Boston University (assistant)
- 2011–2016: Temple (assistant)
- 2016–2018: Connecticut (assistant)
- 2018–2021: Marquette (asst./associate HC)
- 2021–present: Albany

Administrative career (AD unless noted)
- 2003–2006: Charlotte Hornets (VC)
- 2006–2009: Temple (asst. DBO)
- 2009–2010: NBA D-League (admin)

Head coaching record
- Overall: 66–100 (.398)

Dwayne Killings (born April 4, 1981) is an American basketball player and current head coach for the Albany Great Danes men's basketball team.

== Playing career ==
Killings was a walk-on player at UMass from 1999 to 2001, before transferring to Hampton University for his final two years of college.

== Coaching career ==
Killings began coaching right after graduating from college, joining the staff of the NBA's Charlotte Bobcats as a special assistant and video coordinator. In 2006, he became the assistant director of basketball operators at Temple. Following three years with the Owls, Killings started working in the NBA D-League monitoring player development and progress. He began his first job as an assistant coach for college basketball in 2010 at Boston University, where he helped lead the team to a conference championship and an NCAA tournament appearance. In 2011, Killings returned to Temple, this time as an assistant coach helping to lead the team to two regular season conference titles and three NCAA tournament bids. In 2016, Killings was named an assistant coach at Connecticut. However, after two years on the staff, Killings was let go by Connecticut after the firing of head coach Kevin Ollie in March 2018. A few weeks later, on April 12, it was announced that Killings was hired as an assistant at Marquette.

On March 17, 2021, Killings was named the 16th head coach in Albany basketball history, replacing Will Brown. He finished 13–18 in his first season, earning sixth place in the America East Conference.

Killings was suspended for the five games of the 2022–23 season and fined $25,000 for making "inappropriate physical contact" with a player of his.

== Legal issues ==
On March 28, 2022, it was revealed that Killings had been put on leave for the several weeks as Albany investigated an incident where Killings allegedly made incidental contact with a player of his before a game. On April 2, Killings was suspended five games and fined $25,000 by Albany. He claimed the incident occurred in a pregame hype circle in November. In November 2022, Killings was sued by former player Luke Fizulich, who alleged that Killings "violently and viciously grabbed him, threw him up against a locker and struck him in the face, drawing blood." In January 2023, Killings was charged with fourth-degree misdemeanor assault against Fizulich in the state of Kentucky; he pled not guilty. In March 2023, the court resolved the issue by planning to drop the charge in a year if Killings completed a class in "correctional thinking".

== Head coaching record ==
Record table
Season	Team	Overall	Conference	Standing	Postseason
Albany Great Danes (America East) (2021–present)
2021–22	Albany	13–18	9–9	6th	
2022–23	Albany	8–23	3–13	9th	
2023–24	Albany	13–19	5–11	8th	
2024–25	Albany	17–16	8–8	4th	
2025–26	Albany	11–21	7–9	5th	
2026–27	Albany	4–3	0–0		
Albany:		66–100 (.398)	32–50 (.390)		
Total:		66–100 (.398)			
National champion Postseason invitational champion Conference regular season champion Conference regular season and conference tournament champion Division regular season champion Division regular season and conference tournament champion Conference tournament champion
