= 2022 America East men's basketball tournament =

American college basketball postseason tournament

- Classification: Division I
- Season: 2021–22
- Teams: 8
- Site: Campus sites
- Champions: Vermont (8th title)
- Winning coach: John Becker (4th title)
- MVP: Ben Shungu (Vermont)
- Television: ESPN+ ESPN2

The 2022 America East Men's Basketball Conference tournament was the postseason men's basketball tournament for the America East Conference that began on March 6, 2022 and ended on March 12, 2022. All tournament games were played on the home arenas of the higher-seeded school. The winner, Vermont, received the conference's automatic bid to the NCAA tournament.

2021–22 America East Conference men's basketball standings
	Conf.				Overall
Team	W		L	PCT	W		L	PCT
Vermont †	17	–	1	.944	28	–	6	.824
UMBC	11	–	7	.611	18	–	14	.563
Stony Brook*	10	–	8	.556	18	–	13	.581
New Hampshire	10	–	8	.556	15	–	13	.536
Hartford	9	–	9	.500	12	–	20	.375
Albany	9	–	9	.500	13	–	18	.419
Binghamton	8	–	10	.444	12	–	17	.414
UMass Lowell	7	–	11	.389	15	–	16	.484
NJIT	6	–	12	.333	11	–	18	.379
Maine	3	–	15	.167	6	–	23	.207
† 2022 AmEast tournament winner *Ineligible for the 2022 AmEast tournament due to changing conferences in 2022

== Seeds ==
Eight of the ten America East teams qualified for the tournament. Stony Brook was not eligible for the tournament due to a postseason ban imposed by the conference. The teams were seeded by record in conference, with a tiebreaker system to seed teams with identical conference records.

Seed	School	AEC Record	Tiebreaker
1	Vermont	17–1	
2	UMBC	11–7	
3	New Hampshire	10–8	
4	Hartford	9–9	1–1 vs. Vermont
5	Albany	9–9	0–2 vs. Vermont
6	Binghamton	8–10	
7	UMass Lowell	7–11	
8	NJIT	6–12	

== Schedule ==
Game	Time*	Matchup^{#}	Score	Television
Quarterfinals – Sunday, March 6, 2022
1	2:00 pm	No. 8 NJIT at No. 1 Vermont	59–98	ESPN+
2	1:00 pm	No. 7 UMass Lowell at No. 2 UMBC	85–93^{OT}	ESPN+
3	2:00 pm	No. 5 Albany at No. 4 Hartford	49–61	ESPN+
4	1:00 pm	No. 6 Binghamton at No. 3 New Hampshire	72–69	ESPN+
Semifinals – Wednesday, March 9, 2022
5	7:00 pm	No. 6 Binghamton at No. 1 Vermont	42–74	ESPN+
6	7:00 pm	No. 4 Hartford at No. 2 UMBC	60–80	ESPN+
Championship – Saturday, March 12, 2022
7	11:00 am	No. 1 Vermont vs. No.2 UMBC	82–43	ESPN2
*Game times in EST. #-Rankings denote tournament seeding.

== Bracket ==
Quarterfinals; Sunday, March 6, 2022; ESPN+
1	Vermont	98
8	NJIT	59
4	Hartford	61
5	Albany	49
(Pairings are reseeded after the first round)
3	New Hampshire	69
6	Binghamton	72
2	UMBC	93*
7	UMass Lowell	85

Semifinals; Wednesday March 9, 2022; ESPN+
1	Vermont	74
6	Binghamton	42
2	UMBC	80
4	Hartford	60

Championship; Saturday, March 12, 2022; ESPN2
1	Vermont	82
2	UMBC	43

== See also ==
- 2022 America East women's basketball tournament
- America East Conference men's basketball tournament
