= Levell Sanders =

American basketball player and coach

Binghamton Bearcats
- Title: Head coach
- League: America East Conference

Personal information
- Born: December 14, 1975 (age 50) Brooklyn, New York, U.S.
- Listed height: 189 cm (6 ft 2 in)
- Listed weight: 94 kg (207 lb)

Career information
- High school: Jamaica (Queens, New York)
- College: Seton Hall (1994–1998)
- NBA draft: 1998: undrafted
- Playing career: 1999–2014
- Position: Point guard
- Number: 20
- Coaching career: 2014–present

Career history

Playing
- 1998–2001: Mlékárna Kunín
- 2000: Ubizen Echo Hasselt
- 2000–2001: Unia Tarnow
- 2002–2003: Ústí nad Labem
- 2003–2007: Děčín
- 2007–2009: Pardubice
- 2009–2010: Nový Jičín
- 2010–2013: Děčín
- 2013–2014: Pardubice

Coaching
- 2014–2016: Pardubice (assistant)
- 2016–2019: Pardubice
- 2017: Czech Republic U18
- 2019–2021: Binghamton (assistant)
- 2021–present: Binghamton

Career highlights
- Second-team All-Big East (1998)

Levell Leonard Sanders (born December 14, 1975) is an American professional basketball coach and former professional basketball player. He is currently the head coach for the Binghamton Bearcats men's basketball team.

== Playing career ==
A Brooklyn, New York, native, Sanders attended Jamaica High School in Queens, New York, before attending Seton Hall University from 1994 to 1998. After 113 career games played, he posted career game averages of 12.4 points, 3.7 rebounds, 2.5 assists and 1.8 steals. He earned Second team All-BIG East honors as a senior.

Following graduation, he got his first experience as a professional basketball player in the USBL, playing for the New Hampshire Thunder Loons. "I played one game in the USBL and that was in May after my senior season. I left for Europe in August", he said in an interview in April 2009.

Sanders, a 6’3’’ guard, moved to the Czech Republic where he would spend most of his playing career. From 1998 to 2000, he was a member of the Mlekarna Kunin club. In the 2000-01 campaign, he had stints with Ubizen Echo Hasselt of Belgium and Unia Tarnow of Poland. Afterwards, he went back to the Czech Republic. In 2002-03, he played for BK SCP Usti nad Labem, followed by a four-year stint at BK Decin. From 2007 to 2009, Sanders wore BK Pardubice colors and played for Mlekarna Miltra Novy Jicin in 2009-10. He returned to BK Decin, where he spent another three years, before rounding out his playing career with BK Pardubice in the 2013-14 season.

Sanders earned numerous honors in his playing days, including Eurobasket.com All-Czech Republic League Guard of the Year in 2007 as well as Eurobasket.com All-Czech Republic League First Team recognition in both 2006 and 2007.

== Coaching career ==
Sanders began his coaching career as an assistant at BK Pardubice in 2014. In 2016, he was promoted to the head coaching job at the club. He was named Eurobasket.com All-Czech Republic League Coach of the Year in 2017. Sanders was a member of the Czech Republic U18 National Team coaching staff at the 2017 European Championships (Division B) in Estonia.

In June 2019, he was named an assistant coach at Binghamton. On March 1, 2021 Sanders was named as the Interim Head Coach at Binghamton for the 2021–22 season, replacing Tommy Dempsey. After leading the Bearcats to the most league wins since 2010, Sanders was named the permanent head coach at Binghamton, effective in February 2022.

== Head coaching record ==
=== College ===
Record table
Season	Team	Overall	Conference	Standing	Postseason
Binghamton Bearcats (America East) (2021–present)
2021–22	Binghamton	12–17	8–10	7th	
2022–23	Binghamton	13–18	8–8	T–4th	
2023–24	Binghamton	15–15	7–9	T–4th	
2024–25	Binghamton	15–17	7–9	5th	
2025–26	Binghamton	8–23	4–12	9th	
2026–27	Binghamton	4–3	0–0		
Binghamton:		67–93 (.419)	34–48 (.415)		
Total:		67–93 (.419)			
National champion Postseason invitational champion Conference regular season champion Conference regular season and conference tournament champion Division regular season champion Division regular season and conference tournament champion Conference tournament champion

== Personal life ==
He met his wife Pamela in the Czech Republic, in an interview in April 2018, he called the country "a place I call my second home". Sanders is the author of the book "A Guide to Playing Professional Basketball Overseas".
