= Brian Kennedy (basketball) =

American basketball player and coach

Current position
- Title: Assistant coach
- Team: Lehigh
- Conference: Patriot League

Playing career
- 1985–1986: Princeton
- 1988–1990: Monmouth

Coaching career (HC unless noted)
- 1997–2002: DePaul (assistant)
- 2009–2016: NJIT (assistant)
- 2016–2023: NJIT
- 2024–present: Lehigh (assistant)

Head coaching record
- Overall: 81–123 (.397)

Brian Kennedy is an American college basketball coach and former head coach for the NJIT Highlanders men's basketball team.

== Playing career ==
Kennedy grew up in Rumson, New Jersey and attended Christian Brothers Academy. In college, Kennedy his playing career with Princeton before transferring and completing his college career at Monmouth.

== Coaching career ==
Upon graduation, Kennedy took over his family's basketball business, The Hoop Group, one of the largest instructional basketball camps in the United States. He stayed in that role until 1997 when he joined the staff at DePaul as an assistant until 2002. From 2002 to 2009, Kennedy left coaching and worked in the financial sector.

Kennedy returned to coaching in 2009 as an assistant at NJIT under Jim Engles, and upon Engles departure to Columbia, Kennedy was elevated to the head coach.

== Personal life ==
Kennedy's uncle is Pat Kennedy the former head coach at Iona, Florida State, DePaul, Montana and Towson. Kennedy served as an assistant on his uncle's staff at DePaul.

== Head coaching record ==
=== NCAA DI ===
Record table
Season	Team	Overall	Conference	Standing	Postseason
NJIT Highlanders (Atlantic Sun Conference) (2016–2020)
2016–17	NJIT	11–20	3–11	7th	
2017–18	NJIT	14–16	7–7	T–4th	
2018–19	NJIT	22–13	8–8	5th	CIT Second Round
2019–20	NJIT	9–21	6–10	8th	
NJIT Highlanders (America East Conference) (2020–2023)
2020–21	NJIT	7–12	6–10	8th	
2021–22	NJIT	11–18	6–12	9th	
2022–23	NJIT	7–22	4–12	8th	
NJIT:		81–123 (.397)	40–70 (.364)		
Total:		81–123 (.397)			
National champion Postseason invitational champion Conference regular season champion Conference regular season and conference tournament champion Division regular season champion Division regular season and conference tournament champion Conference tournament champion
