= Chesapeake Employers Insurance Arena =

Arena at the University of Maryland, Baltimore County

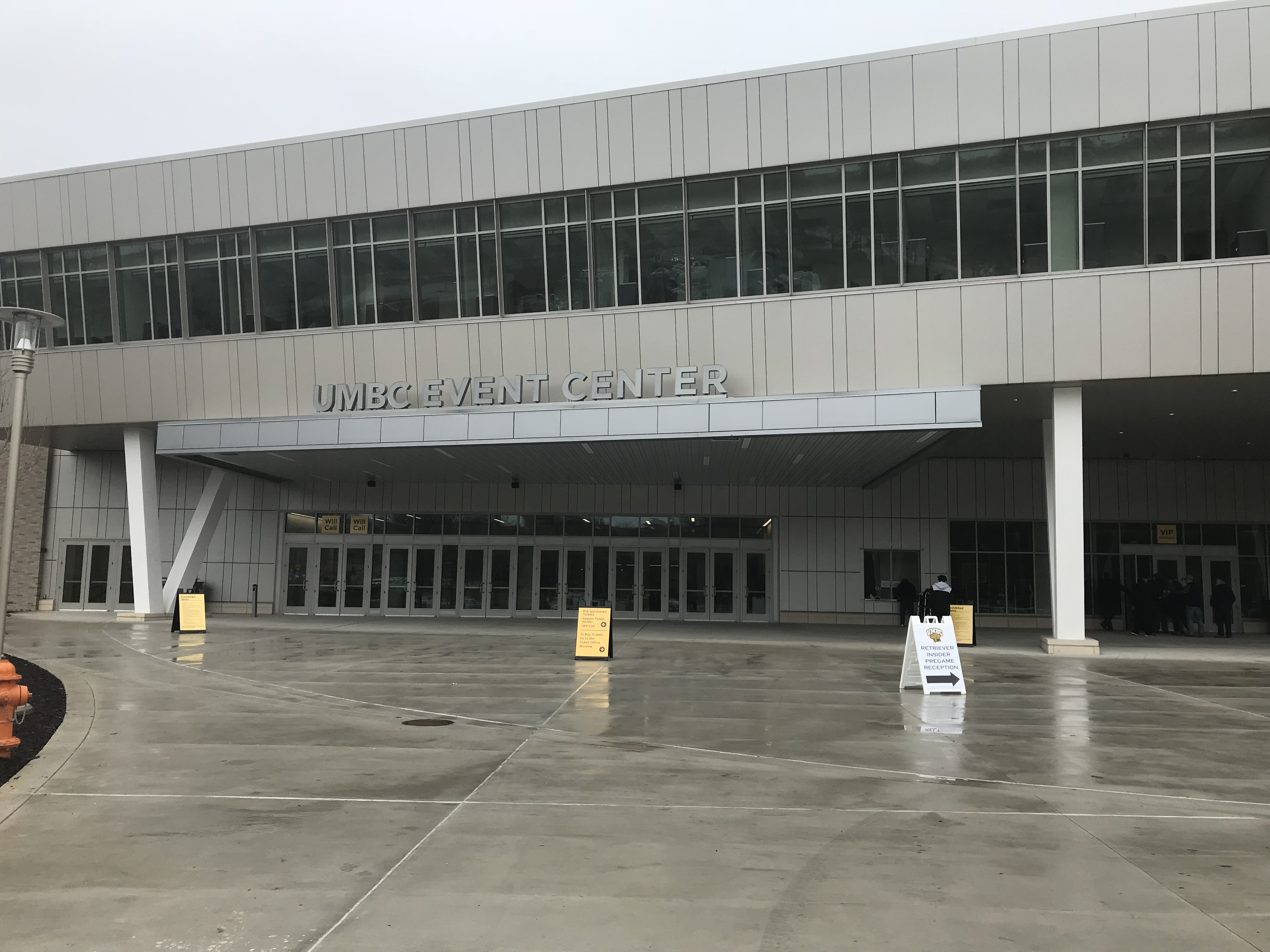
- Interactive map of Chesapeake Employers Insurance Arena
- Former names: UMBC Event Center (2018–2021)
- Address: 1000 Hilltop Circle; Baltimore, MD 21250
- Location: Hilltop Circle & Commons Drive
- Coordinates: 39.2523419°N 76.707431°W
- Owner: University of Maryland, Baltimore County
- Operator: Oak View Group
- Capacity: 4,654 (basketball); 5,500 (concerts)
- Public transit: CityLink Yellow, UMBC Transit

Construction
- Groundbreaking: March 2016
- Opened: February 3, 2018
- Cost: $85 million
- Architect: CannonDesign
- Structural engineer: Providence Engineering Corporation
- General contractor: Barton Malow

Tenants
- UMBC Retrievers; Men's basketball (2018–present); Women's basketball (2018–present); Baltimore Starlings (UpShot League) (2027–)

Website
- www.chesapeakeemployersinsurancearena.com

The Chesapeake Employers Insurance Arena (formerly the UMBC Event Center) is a basketball arena, concert and multi-purpose event venue on the campus of the University of Maryland, Baltimore County (UMBC) in Catonsville, Maryland. It is the home of the UMBC Retrievers men's and women's basketball teams as well as the volleyball team and serves as a replacement to the Retriever Activities Center (RAC). It has a capacity of 5,000 seats, approximately 1,000 more than the RAC, and is the campus venue for all commencements and concerts. Construction began in March 2016, with an estimated cost of $67 million. Although the venue was originally supposed to be completed in time for the beginning of the Fall 2017 semester and the start of the 2017–18 athletic season, due to delays it officially opened for the February 3 men's basketball game against Vermont.

The U.S. professional wrestling promotion Ring of Honor (ROH) frequently used the arena during the period it was owned by Sinclair Broadcasting, which is based in nearby Hunt Valley. This included television tapings during the COVID-19 pandemic, which were held behind closed doors.

On April 19, 2021, the UMBC Events Center rebranded to the Chesapeake Employers Insurance Arena after signing a 15-year deal for arena naming rights.

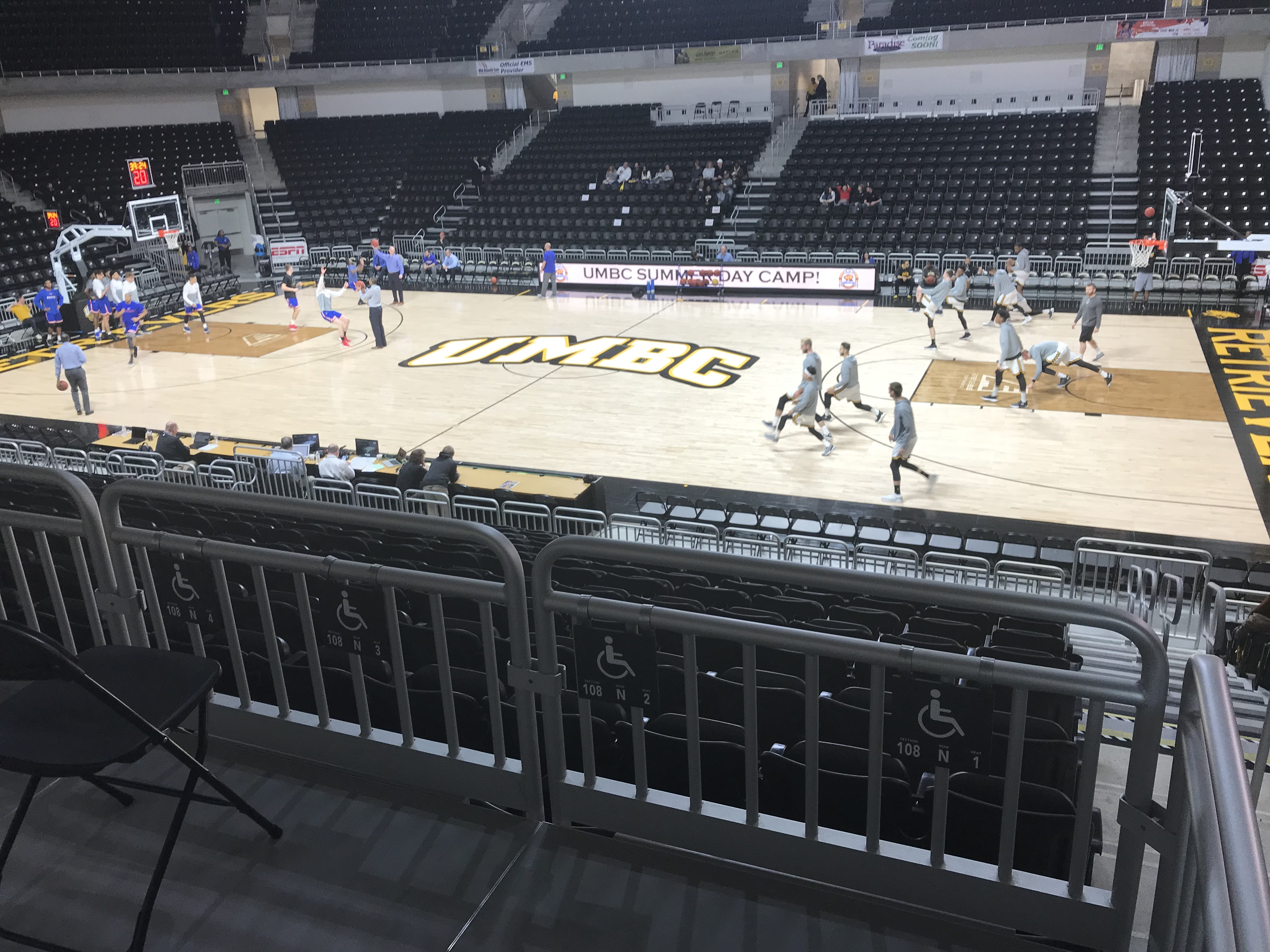
The interior of the center during a game.
