= Peter Kiss (basketball) =

American basketball player

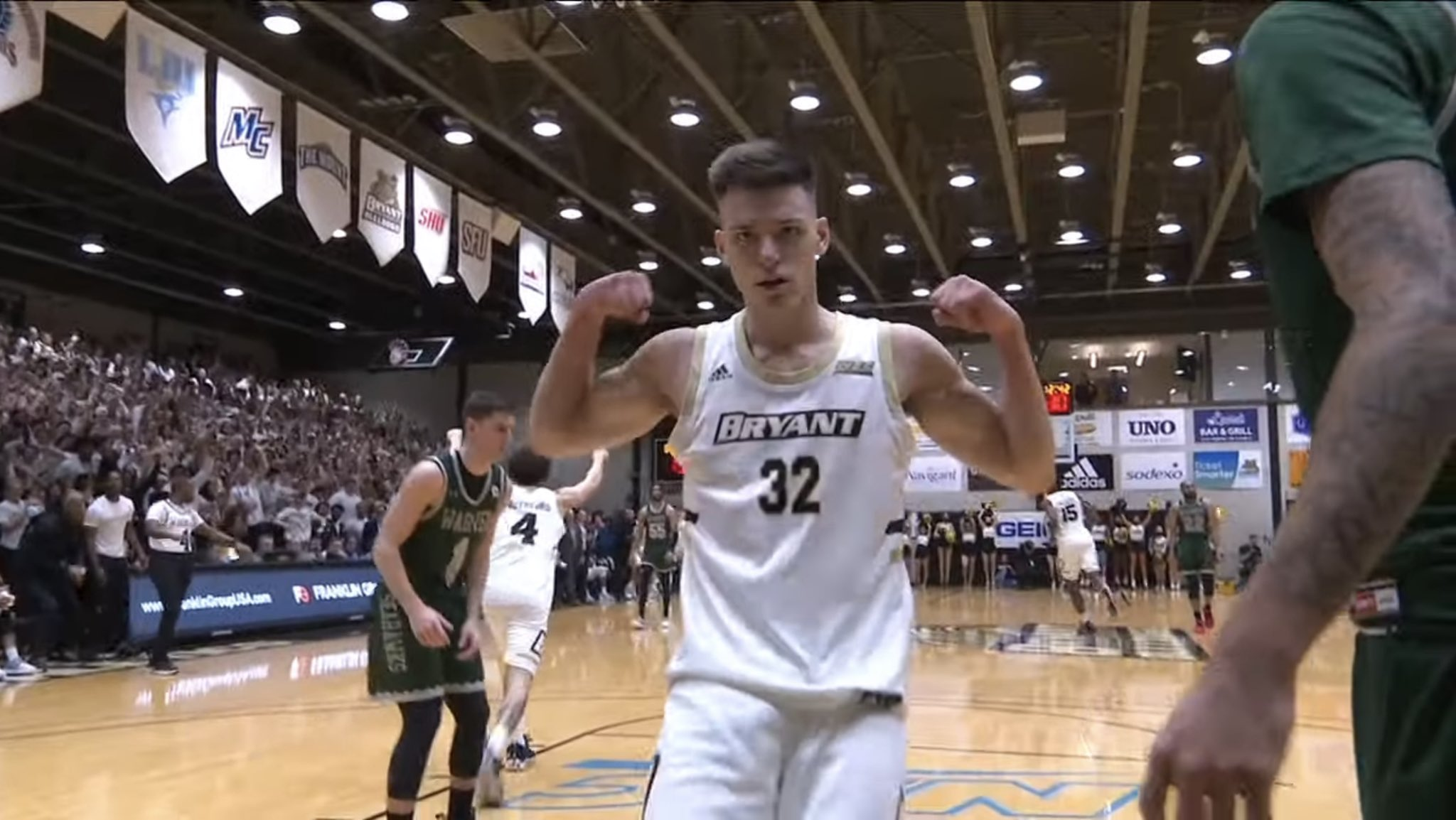

Free agent
- Position: Shooting guard

Personal information
- Born: May 9, 1997 (age 29) Manhattan, New York, U.S.
- Listed height: 6 ft 5 in (1.96 m)
- Listed weight: 200 lb (91 kg)

Career information
- High school: Monsignor Scanlan (The Bronx, New York); Victory Rock Prep (Sarasota, Florida); Notre Dame Prep (Fitchburg, Massachusetts)
- College: Quinnipiac (2016–2017); Rutgers (2018–2020); Bryant (2020–2022)
- NBA draft: 2022: undrafted

Career history
- 2022: Soles de Mexicali
- 2023–2024: Yambol
- 2024: El Calor de Cancún
- 2024–2025: CSM Ploiești
- 2025–: CS Vâlcea 1924

Career highlights
- NCAA scoring champion (2022); 2× First-team All-NEC (2021, 2022); NEC tournament MVP (2022); MAAC All-Rookie Team (2017)

Peter Richard Kiss (born May 9, 1997) is an American professional basketball player who last played for CS Vâlcea 1924 of the Liga Națională. He played college basketball for the Bryant Bulldogs of the Northeast Conference (NEC). He previously played for the Quinnipiac Bobcats and the Rutgers Scarlet Knights. In Kiss' redshirt senior season at Bryant University, he averaged 25.2 points per game leading the NCAA Division I in scoring.

== High school career ==
Kiss started his high school career at Loyola School Manhattan then Monsignor Scanlan High School in The Bronx, New York, and began playing basketball seriously in his sophomore season. He then attended Victory Rock Prep School in Sarasota, Florida before spending his senior year at Notre Dame Preparatory School in Fitchburg, Massachusetts. Kiss committed to playing college basketball for Quinnipiac in October 2015.

== College career ==
=== Quinnipiac ===
Kiss spent one year at Quinnipiac. In his one-season, Kiss became a leader on the team averaging 13.3 points per game. He was named to the MAAC All-Rookie Team including being named the MAAC Rookie of the Week four times and leading Quinnipiac in scoring in eight games. Kiss transferred to Rutgers over the likes of Seton Hall and Auburn.

=== Rutgers ===
In his first year with Rutgers, Kiss redshirted due to not being eligible because of NCAA transfer rules. In his first season playing with Rutgers, Kiss would play in 30 games averaging six points a game. Despite this, there were concerns regarding Kiss' defense. The following season, Kiss would only play in two games and as a result Kiss made the decision to transfer to Bryant.

=== Bryant ===
In Kiss' first year at Bryant, he played in and started in 22 games averaging 16.6 points per game. As a result, Kiss was named to the First-team All-NEC. In Kiss' second season with Bryant, he led the NCAA in scoring. Kiss averaged 25.1 points per game. Kiss became the fastest player in program history to tally 1,000 points, doing so in 48 games. During the season, Kiss was suspended for the first two games by Bryant head coach Jared Grasso for an unspecified violation of team rules. Kiss was suspended for a second time for unsportsmanlike conduct in a game against Long Island. The suspension kept Kiss out for another two games. Throughout the season, Kiss led the NCAA in technical fouls with 9.

Despite being one of the top scorers in Division I basketball, Kiss did not win the NEC Player of the Year Award, and it was believed that Kiss's antics kept him from winning the award. He was named to the First Team All-NEC, however. An assistant coach in the NEC called Kiss "bush league" and recalled how he mocked opposing players after turnovers and blew a kiss at Fairleigh Dickinson head coach Greg Herenda after hitting a 3-pointer, among other incidents.

In the 2022 NEC tournament, Kiss led the Bulldogs to the championship game after wins against Central Connecticut and Mount St. Mary's. Throughout the game, Kiss regularly taunted opposing players and fans by showboating, flexing and doing push-ups after field goals, even screaming "That's for you, bitch!" at a reporter who predicted Bryant would lose. After a brawl and a 30-minute delay, play resumed, and the Bulldogs won 70–43 to clinch their first ever bid to the NCAA tournament. Kiss was named the MVP of the tournament.

In the 2022 NCAA Division I men's basketball tournament, Kiss scored 28 points in the Bulldog's First Four game against Wright State. Bryant lost the game 82–93.

== Professional career ==
In September 2022, Kiss signed with Mexican team Soles de Mexicali. He scored 11 points in his professional debut, an 89–75 loss to the Dorados de Chihuahua. In October 2023, he signed one year deal with the Bulgarian top flight team Yambol

On August 23, 2024, Kiss signed with CSM Ploiești of the Liga Națională. On November 25, he was replaced by Justin Edwards.

== Career statistics ==
Legend
GP	Games played	GS	Games started	MPG	Minutes per game
FG%	Field goal percentage	3P%	3-point field goal percentage	FT%	Free throw percentage
RPG	Rebounds per game	APG	Assists per game	SPG	Steals per game
BPG	Blocks per game	PPG	Points per game	**Bold**	Career high

*	Led NCAA Division I

=== College ===
Year	Team	GP	GS	MPG	FG%	3P%	FT%	RPG	APG	SPG	BPG	PPG
2016–17	Quinnipiac	**31**	20	29.8	.408	.277	.742	5.6	2.8	1.2	.2	13.3
2017–18	Rutgers	Redshirt										
2018–19	Rutgers	30	11	18.1	.384	.302	.581	2.2	.9	.4	.1	6.0
2019–20	Rutgers	2	0	6.5	.000	.000	.000	1.0	.5	.5	.0	.0
2020–21	Bryant	22	22	33.0	**.504**	**.424**	**.851**	**6.5**	**3.2**	**1.9**	**.3**	16.6
2021–22	Bryant	27	**26**	**35.7**	.456	.296	.784	5.8	**3.2**	1.7	**.3**	**25.2***
Career		112	79	28.3	.441	.313	.771	4.8	2.4	1.2	.2	14.6

== Personal life ==
Kiss' parents, Peter and Ida, emigrated from Hungary and Romania. Growing up in Manhattan, Kiss mainly played baseball.
