= 2021–22 Northeast Conference men's basketball season =

- League: NCAA Division I
- Sport: Basketball
- Number of teams: 10
- TV partner(s): NEC Front Row, ESPN2, MSG, FCS, Regional Sports Networks

NBA Draft

Regular season
- First place: Bryant
- Runners-up: Wagner
- Season MVP: Alex Morales (Wagner)
- Top scorer: Peter Kiss (Bryant)

NEC tournament
- Champions: Bryant
- Runners-up: Wagner
- Finals MVP: Peter Kiss (Bryant)

Northeast Conference men's basketball seasons
- ← 2020–21 2022–23 →

2021–22 Northeast Conference men's basketball standings
| | Conf. | | | | Overall |
| Team | W | | L | PCT | W | | L | PCT |
|---|---|---|---|---|---|---|---|---|
| Bryant † | 16 | – | 2 | .889 | 22 | – | 10 | .688 |
| Wagner | 15 | – | 3 | .833 | 21 | – | 6 | .778 |
| LIU | 12 | – | 6 | .667 | 16 | – | 14 | .533 |
| Merrimack* | 10 | – | 8 | .556 | 14 | – | 16 | .467 |
| Mount St. Mary's | 9 | – | 9 | .500 | 14 | – | 16 | .467 |
| St. Francis Brooklyn | 7 | – | 11 | .389 | 10 | – | 20 | .333 |
| Sacred Heart | 6 | – | 12 | .333 | 10 | – | 20 | .333 |
| Saint Francis (PA) | 5 | – | 13 | .278 | 9 | – | 21 | .300 |
| Central Connecticut | 5 | – | 13 | .278 | 8 | – | 24 | .250 |
| Fairleigh Dickinson | 5 | – | 13 | .278 | 4 | – | 22 | .154 |
* ineligible for the 2022 NCAA tournament due to transition period
† 2022 NEC tournament winner

The 2021–22 Northeast Conference men's basketball season began with practices in October 2021, followed by the start of the 2021–22 NCAA Division I men's basketball season in November. Conference play started in January and ended in February 2022.

The NEC tournament was held in March with the higher-seeded team hosting each game.

== Changes from last season ==
On March 5, 2021, it was announced that Central Connecticut head coach Donyell Marshall, was stepping down after five years with the Blue Devils. On May 14, Central Connecticut hired Fairfield assistant coach Patrick Sellers as his replacement.

== Head coaches ==
| Team | Head coach | Previous position | Year at school | Overall record | NEC record | NEC tournament championships |
|---|---|---|---|---|---|---|
| Bryant | Jared Grasso | Iona (asst.) | 4 | 40–44 | 24–26 | 0 |
| Central Connecticut | Patrick Sellers | Fairfield (asst.) | 1 | 0–0 | 0–0 | 0 |
| Fairleigh Dickinson | Greg Herenda | UMass Lowell | 9 | 101–142 | 67–75 | 2 |
| LIU | Derek Kellogg | UMass | 5 | 58–60 | 37–35 | 1 |
| Merrimack | Joe Gallo | Robert Morris (asst.) | 6 | 90–54 | 23–13 | 0 |
| Mount St. Mary's | Dan Engelstad | Southern Vermont | 4 | 32–54 | 31–37 | 0 |
| Sacred Heart | Anthony Latina | Sacred Heart (asst.) | 9 | 99–140 | 67–73 | 0 |
| St. Francis Brooklyn | Glenn Braica | St. John's (asst.) | 12 | 154–180 | 102–94 | 0 |
| Saint Francis (PA) | Rob Krimmel | Saint Francis (asst.) | 10 | 125–149 | 83–77 | 0 |
| Wagner | Bashir Mason | Wagner (asst.) | 10 | 144–124 | 96–64 | 0 |

Notes:

- All records, appearances, titles, etc. are from time with current school only.
- Year at school includes 2021–22 season.
- Overall and NEC/NCAA records are from time at current school and are before the beginning of the 2021–22 season. Because the current LIU athletic program inherited the athletic history of LIU Brooklyn, Kellogg's record includes his two seasons at LIU Brooklyn before the LIU athletic merger.
- Previous jobs are head coaching jobs unless otherwise noted.

== Preseason ==
=== Preseason coaches poll ===
| Rank | Team |
|---|---|
| 1. | Wagner (7) |
| 2. | Bryant (2) |
| 3. | Mount St. Mary's (1) |
| 4. | Long Island |
| 5. | Merrimack |
| 6. | Sacred Heart |
| 7. | St. Francis Brooklyn |
| 8. | Saint Francis (PA) |
| 9. | Fairleigh Dickinson |
| 10. | Central Connecticut |

() first place votes

=== Preseason All-NEC team ===
| Recipient | School |
|---|---|
| Ty Flowers, (Senior, Forward) | LIU |
| Elijah Ford, (Senior, Guard) | Wagner |
| Peter Kiss, (Senior, Guard) | Bryant |
| Alex Morales, (Senior, Guard) | Wagner |
| Eral Penn, (R-Senior, Forward) | LIU |
| Tyler Thomas, (Junior, Guard) | Sacred Heart |

== NEC regular season ==
=== Player of the week ===
Throughout the regular season, the Northeast Conference offices named player(s) of the week and rookie(s) of the week.

| Week | Player of the week | Rookie of the week |
|---|---|---|
| November 15, 2021 | Alex Morales, WAG | Joe Ostrowsky, CCSU |
| November 22, 2021 | Peter Kiss, BRY | Ibrahim Wattara, FDU |
| November 29, 2021 | Josh Cohen, SFPA; Jordan Minor, MER | Jayden Brown, CCSU |
| December 6, 2021 | Nigel Scantlebury, CCSU | Andre Snoddy, CCSU |
| December 13, 2021 | Charles Pride, BRY | Jayden Brown (2), CCSU |
| December 20, 2021 | Eral Penn, LIU | Jaylin Gibson, MSM |
| December 27, 2021 | Alex Morales (2), WAG | Zaire Williams, WAG |
| January 3, 2022 | Jordan Minor (2), MER; Ty Flowers, LIU | Sebastien Lamaute, FDU |
| January 10, 2022 | Alex Morales (3), WAG | Andre Snoddy (2), CCSU |
| January 19, 2022 | Peter Kiss (2), BRY; Ty Flowers (2), LIU | Andre Snoddy (3), CCSU |
| January 25, 2022 | Alex Morales (4), WAG; Ty Flowers (3), LIU | Anquan Hill, FDU |
| February 1, 2022 | Alex Morales (5), WAG; Jalen Benjamin, MSM | Andre Snoddy (4), CCSU |
| February 7, 2022 | Charles Pride (2), BRY | Andre Snoddy (5), CCSU |
| February 14, 2022 | Ty Flowers (4), LIU | Anquan Hill (2), FDU |
| February 21, 2022 | Peter Kiss (3), BRY | Andre Snoddy (6), CCSU; Tanner Thomas, SHU |
| February 28, 2022 | Peter Kiss (4), BRY; Eral Penn (2), LIU | Anquan Hill (3), FDU |

| School | Player of the week Awards | Rookie of the week Awards |
|---|---|---|
| Bryant | 6 | 0 |
| Central Connecticut | 1 | 9 |
| Fairleigh Dickinson | 0 | 5 |
| LIU | 6 | 0 |
| Merrimack | 2 | 0 |
| Mount St. Mary's | 1 | 1 |
| Sacred Heart | 0 | 1 |
| St. Francis Brooklyn | 0 | 0 |
| Saint Francis (PA) | 1 | 0 |
| Wagner | 5 | 1 |

=== Against other conferences ===
Records against non-conference foes for the 2021–22 season. Records shown for regular season only.

| Conference | Outcome |
|---|---|
| America East | 9–12 |
| AAC | 0–3 |
| ACC | 0–4 |
| Atlantic-10 | 2–8 |
| Big East | 0–9 |
| Big South | 0–1 |
| Big Ten | 0–7 |

| Conference | Outcome |
|---|---|
| CAA | 0–3 |
| Horizon League | 1–2 |
| Ivy League | 2–6 |
| MAAC | 2–5 |
| Mid-American | 0–2 |
| MEAC | 5–0 |
| Mountain West Conference | 0–1 |

| Conference | Outcome |
|---|---|
| Patriot League | 7–6 |
| SEC | 0–1 |
| Southland | 0–1 |
| SWAC | 0–1 |
| The Summit | 0–1 |
| WCC | 0–3 |
| Total | 28–76 (.269) |

=== Conference matrix ===
This table summarizes the head-to-head results between teams in conference play.

| | Bryant | CCSU | FDU | LIU | Merrimack | MSMU | Sacred Heart | SFB | SFU | Wagner |
|---|---|---|---|---|---|---|---|---|---|---|
| vs. Bryant | – | 0–2 | 0–2 (Note: One of the losses was by forfeit.) | 1–1 | 0–2 | 0–2 | 0–2 | 0–2 | 0–2 | 1–1 |
| vs. Central Conn. | 2–0 | – | 1–1 | 1–1 | 1–1 | 2–0 | 1–1 (Note: Loss was by forfeit.) | 1–1 | 2–0 | 2–0 |
| vs. Fairleigh Dickinson | 2–0 (Note: One of the wins was by forfeit.) | 1–1 | – | 2–0 | 2–0 | 1–1 | 1–1 | 2–0 | 1–1 | 1–1 |
| vs. LIU | 1–1 | 1–1 | 0–2 | – | 1–1 | 0–2 | 1–1 | 0–2 | 0–2 | 2–0 |
| vs. Merrimack | 2–0 | 1–1 | 0–2 | 1–1 | – | 2–0 | 0–2 | 0–2 | 1–1 | 1–1 |
| vs. Mount St. Mary's | 2–0 | 0–2 | 1–1 (Note: Win was by forfeit.) | 2–0 | 0–2 | – | 1–1 | 1–1 | 0–2 | 2–0 |
| vs. Sacred Heart | 2–0 | 1–1 | 1–1 | 1–1 | 2–0 | 1–1 | – | 1–1 | 1–1 | 2–0 |
| vs. St. Francis Brooklyn | 2–0 | 1–1 | 0–2 | 2–0 | 2–0 | 1–1 | 1–1 | – | 0–2 | 2–0 |
| vs. Saint Francis (PA) | 2–0 | 0–2 | 1–1 | 2–0 | 1–1 | 2–0 | 1–1 | 2–0 | – | 2–0 |
| vs. Wagner | 1–1 | 0–2 | 1–1 | 0–2 | 1–1 | 0–2 | 0–2 | 0–2 | 0–2 | – |
| Total | 16–2 | 5–13 | 5–13 | 12–6 | 10–8 | 9–9 | 6–12 | 7–11 | 5–13 | 15–3 |

=== All-NEC honors and awards ===
At the conclusion of the regular season, the conference selects outstanding performers based on a poll of league coaches, below are the results.

| Honor | Recipient |
|---|---|
| Player of the Year | Alex Morales, WAG |
| Coach of the Year | Jared Grasso, BRY |
| Defensive Player of the Year | Alex Morales, WAG |
| Rookie of the Year | Anquan Hill, FDU |
| Most Improved Player of the Year | Josh Cohen, SFPA |
| All-NEC First Team | Ty Flowers, LIU |
| All-NEC First Team | Peter Kiss, BRY |
| All-NEC First Team | Alex Morales, WAG |
| All-NEC First Team | Eral Penn, LIU |
| All-NEC First Team | Charles Pride, BRY |

| Honor | Recipient |
|---|---|
| All-NEC Second Team | Jalen Benjamin, MSM |
| All-NEC Second Team | Michael Cubbage, SFBK |
| All-NEC Second Team | Will Martinez, WAG |
| All-NEC Second Team | Jordan Minor, MER |
| All-NEC Second Team | Raekwon Rogers, WAG |
| All-NEC Third Team | Aaron Clarke, SHU |
| All-NEC Third Team | Elijah Ford, WAG |
| All-NEC Third Team | Mezie Offurum, MSM |
| All-NEC Third Team | Nana Opoku, MSM |
| All-NEC Third Team | Tyler Thomas, SHU |
| All-NEC Rookie Team | Oscar Berry, FDU |
| All-NEC Rookie Team | Anquan Hill, FDU |
| All-NEC Rookie Team | Sebastien Lamaute, FDU |
| All-NEC Rookie Team | Andre Snoddy, CCSU |
| All-NEC Rookie Team | Zaire Williams, WAG |

== Postseason ==
=== NEC tournament ===
- 2022 Northeast Conference Men's Basketball Tournament, held at higher seed campus sites

Opening Round; Monday, February 28; NEC Front Row
8 | Fairleigh Dickinson | 66
9 | Central Connecticut | 67

Quarterfinals; Wednesday March 2 NEC Front Row
1 | Bryant | 73
9 | Central Connecticut | 59
4 | Mount St. Mary's | 78
5 | St. Francis Brooklyn | 48
2 | Wagner | 82
7 | Saint Francis (PA) | 53
3 | Long Island | 82
6 | Sacred Heart | 75

Semifinals; Saturday, March 5 ESPN3
1 | Bryant | 70
4 | Mount St. Mary's | 69
2 | Wagner | 82
3 | Long Island | 62

Championship; Tuesday, March 8 ESPN2
1 | Bryant | 70
2 | Wagner | 43

* denotes overtime period.

=== NCAA tournament ===
| Seed | Region | School | First Four |
|---|---|---|---|
| 16 | South | Bryant | vs. Wright State, L 82–93 |

== See also ==
- 2021–22 Northeast Conference women's basketball season
