= 2021–22 Wagner Seahawks men's basketball team =

American college basketball season

2021–22 Wagner Seahawks men's basketball
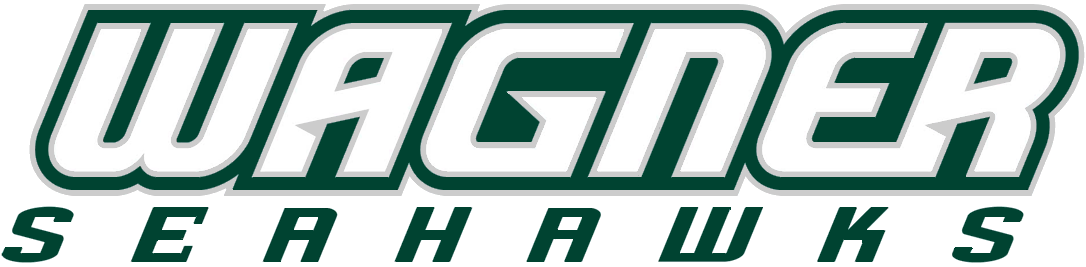
- Conference: Northeast Conference
- Record: 21–6 (15–3 NEC)
- Head coach: Bashir Mason (10th season)
- Assistant coaches: Winston Smith; Bobby Jordan; Pete Gash
- Home arena: Spiro Sports Center

2021–22 Northeast Conference men's basketball standings
	Conf.				Overall
Team	W		L	PCT	W		L	PCT
Bryant †	16	–	2	.889	22	–	10	.688
Wagner	15	–	3	.833	21	–	6	.778
LIU	12	–	6	.667	16	–	14	.533
Merrimack*	10	–	8	.556	14	–	16	.467
Mount St. Mary's	9	–	9	.500	14	–	16	.467
St. Francis Brooklyn	7	–	11	.389	10	–	20	.333
Sacred Heart	6	–	12	.333	10	–	20	.333
Saint Francis (PA)	5	–	13	.278	9	–	21	.300
Central Connecticut	5	–	13	.278	8	–	24	.250
Fairleigh Dickinson	5	–	13	.278	4	–	22	.154
† 2022 NEC tournament winner * ineligible for the 2022 NCAA tournament due to transition period

The 2021–22 Wagner Seahawks men's basketball team represented Wagner College during the 2021–22 NCAA Division I men's basketball season. The Seahawks were led by 10th-year head coach Bashir Mason and they played their home games at Spiro Sports Center on the school's Staten Island campus as members of the Northeast Conference.

== Previous season ==
In a season limited due to the ongoing COVID-19 pandemic, the Seahawks finished the season 13–7, 13–5 in NEC play to win the regular season championship. They lost in the semifinals of the NEC tournament to Mount St. Mary's. Due to the ongoing pandemic, the National Invitation Tournament was modified and, as a result, did not award bids to teams who had won their regular season championship, but failed to qualify for the NCAA tournament. The Seahawks did not receive a bid to the NIT.

== Roster ==
2021–22 Wagner Seahawks men's basketball team
Players
Coaches

Pos.	#	Name	Height	Weight	Year	Previous school	Hometown
F	0	Nigel Jackson	6 ft 7 in (2.01 m)	215 lb (98 kg)	GS	Mount St. Joseph HS	Baltimore, MD
G	1	Javier Ezquerra	6 ft 1 in (1.85 m)	175 lb (79 kg)	Fr	IMG Academy	San Juan, Puerto Rico
G	2	Alex Morales	6 ft 6 in (1.98 m)	195 lb (88 kg)	GS	Prince George's CC	Paterson, NJ
G	3	DeLonnie Hunt	6 ft 0 in (1.83 m)	170 lb (77 kg)	So	Rock Creek Christian Academy	Upper Marlboro, MD
G	4	Elijah Ford	6 ft 5 in (1.96 m)	220 lb (100 kg)	GS	Barton CC	Newark, NJ
G	5	Jordan Mason	6 ft 4 in (1.93 m)	220 lb (100 kg)	Jr	Dexter Southfield	Boston, MA
G	11	Will Martinez	6 ft 5 in (1.96 m)	190 lb (86 kg)	GS	Monroe College	Bronx, NY
G	12	Zaire Williams	6 ft 4 in (1.93 m)	190 lb (86 kg)	Fr	Eagle Academy	Brooklyn, NY
G	13	Ashton Miller	6 ft 5 in (1.96 m)	205 lb (93 kg)	Jr	Duquesne	Scotch Plains, NJ
F	22	Ja'Mier Fletcher	6 ft 7 in (2.01 m)	245 lb (111 kg)	Jr	First Love Christian Academy	Pittsburgh, PA
F	24	Rob Taylor II	6 ft 7 in (2.01 m)	220 lb (100 kg)	Fr	St. Mark's	Brooklyn, NY
F	32	Raekwon Rogers	6 ft 8 in (2.03 m)	240 lb (109 kg)	RS Sr	Henderson State	Little Rock, AR
F	55	Jahbril Price Noel	6 ft 7 in (2.01 m)	215 lb (98 kg)	Sr	Pacific	Scarborough, ON

Head coach

- Bashir Mason (Drexel)

Assistant coach(es)

- Winston Smith (UMass)
- Bobby Jordan (Drexel)
- Pete Gash (Chattanooga)

Legend

- (C) Team captain
- (S) Suspended
- (I) Ineligible
- (W) Walk-on
- Injured
- Current redshirt

Roster
Last update: January 30, 2022

== Schedule and results ==
Following wins in the first two games of the season, the Seahawks were forced to postpone three consecutive non-conference games due to COVID-19 issues within the program. They returned to play on December 1, but were without head coach Mason and two of their leading scorers.

NEC COVID-19 policy provided that if a team could not play a conference game due to COVID-19 issues within its program, the game would be declared a forfeit and the other team would receive a conference win. However, wins related to COVID-19 do not count pursuant to NCAA policy.

Date time, TV	Rank^{#}	Opponent^{#}	Result	Record	High points	High rebounds	High assists	Site (attendance) city, state
Non-conference regular season
November 9, 2021*; 7:00 pm		Hartford	W 77–59	1–0	18 – Martinez	8 – Martinez	5 – Martinez	Spiro Sports Center (1,924); Staten Island, NY
November 13, 2021*; 7:00 pm, ESPN+		at VCU	W 58–44	2–0	20 – Morales	11 – Morales	4 – Martinez	Siegel Center (7,412); Richmond, VA
November 17, 2021*; 7:00 pm		Saint Peter's	Canceled due to COVID-19 issues					Spiro Sports Center; Staten Island, NY
November 20, 2021*; 7:30 pm		NJIT	Canceled due to COVID-19 issues					Spiro Sports Center; Staten Island, NY
November 24, 2021*; 4:00 pm		at Army	Canceled due to COVID-19 issues					Christl Arena; West Point, NY
December 1, 2021*; 7:00 pm, FS2		at No. 25 Seton Hall	L 63–85	2–1	15 – Rogers	5 – Tied	3 – Tied	Prudential Center (8,136); Newark, NJ
December 4, 2021*; 6:30 pm, SNY		at Stony Brook	W 78–49	3–1	19 – Morales	9 – Morales	7 – Ezquerra	IFCU Arena (2,070); Stony Brook, NY
December 8, 2021*; 7:00 pm, BTN+		at Penn State	L 54–74	3–2	11 – Morales	5 – Rogers	5 – Tied	Bryce Jordan Center (7,499); State College, PA
December 16, 2021*; 7:00 pm		Immaculata	W 104–46	4–2	17 – Ford	7 – Miller	5 – Tied	Spiro Sports Center (1,002); Staten Island, NY
December 20, 2021*; 7:00 pm		Delaware State	W 93–51	5–2	17 – Hunt	7 – Tied	5 – Martinez	Spiro Sports Center (959); Staten Island, NY
December 23, 2021*; 2:00 pm, ESPN3		at Fairfield	W 63–50	6–2	15 – Tied	7 – Fletcher	3 – Martinez	Webster Bank Arena (1,285); Fairfield, CT
NEC regular season
December 29, 2021; 7:00 pm		at Saint Francis (PA)	W 72–64	7–2 (1–0)	18 – Rogers	9 – Morales	4 – Ford	DeGol Arena (374); Loretto, PA
December 31, 2021; 2:00 pm		at Mount St. Mary's	W 1–0 (Forfeit)	7–2 (2–0)	–	–	–	Knott Arena; Emmitsburg, MD
January 6, 2022; 7:00 pm, SNY/ESPN3		Bryant	W 84–81 ^{OT}	8–2 (3–0)	24 – Morales	1 – Rogers	6 – Ford	Spiro Sports Center (1,317); Staten Island, NY
January 8, 2022; 1:00 pm		Sacred Heart	W 1–0 (Forfeit)	8–2 (4–0)	–	–	–	Spiro Sports Center; Staten Island, NY
January 15, 2022; 1:00 pm		St. Francis Brooklyn	W 81–76	9–2 (5–0)	22 – Rogers	8 – Ford	4 – Hunt	Spiro Sports Center (1,281); Staten Island, NY
January 17, 2022; 7:00 pm		Fairleigh Dickinson	W 95–64	10–2 (6–0)	19 – Morales	8 – Morales	5 – Morales	Spiro Sports Center (1,228); Staten Island, NY
January 21, 2022; 7:00 pm		at LIU	W 92–85	11–2 (7–0)	35 – Morales	12 – Morales	3 – Morales	Steinberg Wellness Center (232); Brooklyn, NY
January 23, 2022; 3:00 pm		Merrimack	W 71–57	12–2 (8–0)	20 – Ford	6 – Morales	4 – Martinez	Spiro Sports Center (723); Staten Island, NY
January 27, 2022; 7:00 pm		Saint Francis (PA)	W 69–54	13–2 (9–0)	18 – Morales	11 – Rogers	7 – Morales	Spiro Sports Center (1,397); Staten Island, NY
January 30, 2022; 2:00 pm		at St Francis Brooklyn	W 72–69	14–2 (10–0)	21 – Morales	8 – Ford	4 – Hunt	Daniel Lynch Gymnasium (1,193); Brooklyn, NY
February 3, 2022; 7:00 pm		at Central Connecticut	W 54–52	15–2 (11–0)	11 – Morales	7 – Fletcher	2 – Morales	Detrick Gymnasium (1,003); New Britain, CT
February 5, 2022; 1:00 pm		LIU	W 79–64	16–2 (12–0)	28 – Morales	14 – Morales	3 – Morales	Spiro Sports Center (1,617); Staten Island, NY
February 10, 2022; 5:00 pm		Mount St. Mary's	W 69–57	17–2 (13–0)	21 – Morales	10 – Rogers	5 – Morales	Spiro Sports Center (1,944); Staten Island, NY
February 12, 2022; 1:00 pm		Merrimack	L 65–80 ^{OT}	17–3 (13–1)	22 – Martinez	9 – Morales	4 – Hunt	Spiro Sports Center (1,379); Staten Island, NY
February 17, 2022; 7:00 pm, ESPN3		at Sacred Heart	W 76–67	18–3 (14–1)	25 – Martinez	7 – Martinez	4 – Hunt	William H. Pitt Center (583); Fairfield, CT
February 19, 2022; 1:00 pm		Central Connecticut	W 78–68	19–3 (15–1)	26 – Rogers	6 – Morales	6 – Martinez	Spiro Sports Center (1,207); Staten Island, NY
February 24, 2022; 7:00 pm, CBSSN		at Fairleigh Dickinson	L 86–88 ^{OT}	19–4 (15–2)	25 – Morales	9 – Morales	6 – Hunt	Rothman Center (859); Hackensack, NJ
February 26, 2022; 1:00 pm, ESPN3		at Bryant	L 70–78	19–5 (15–3)	24 – Morales	12 – Morales	5 – Morales	Chace Athletic Center (2,650); Smithfield, RI
NEC tournament
March 2, 2022; 7:00 pm, NEC Front Row	(2)	(7) Saint Francis (PA); Quarterfinals	W 82–53	20–5	24 – Hunt	12 – Morales	10 – Morales	Spiro Sports Center (1,811); Staten Island, NY
March 5, 2022; 8:00 pm, ESPN3	(2)	(3) LIU; Semifinals	W 82–62	21–5	19 – Morales	11 – Rogers	4 – Morales	Spiro Sports Center (2,004); Staten Island, NY
March 8, 2022; 7:00 pm, ESPN2	(2)	at (1) Bryant; Championship	L 43–70	21–6	12 – Rogers	8 – Morales	4 – Hunt	Chace Athletic Center (2,650); Smithfield, RI
*Non-conference game. ^{#}Rankings from AP Poll. (#) Tournament seedings in parentheses. All times are in Eastern.
