= 2021–22 Bryant Bulldogs men's basketball team =

American college basketball season

2021–22 Bryant Bulldogs men's basketball
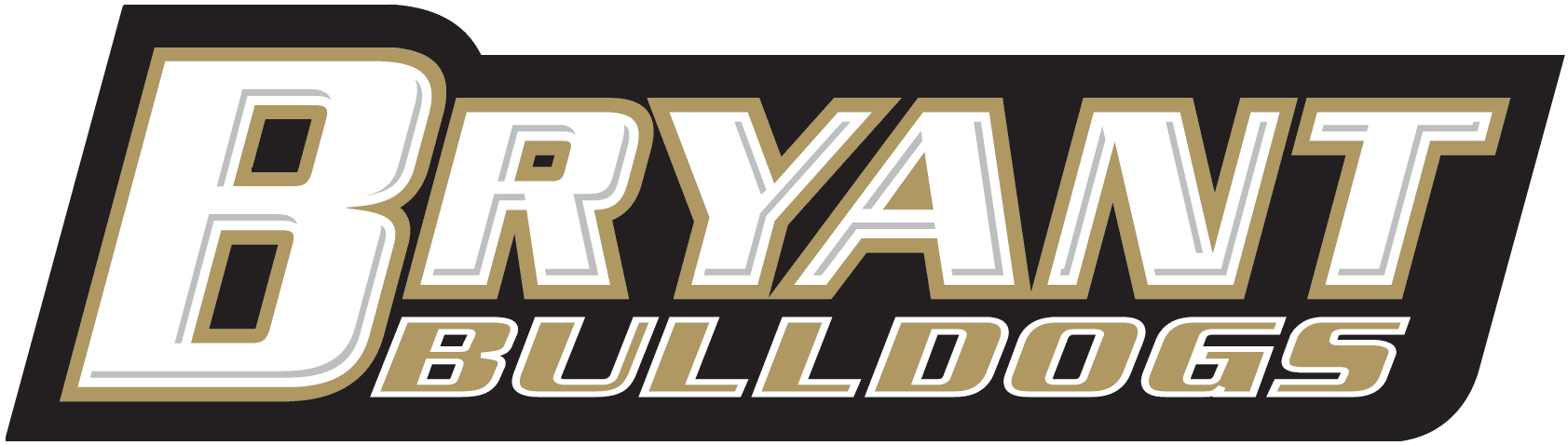

NEC regular season and tournament champions

NCAA tournament, First Four
- Conference: Northeast Conference
- Record: 22–10 (16–2 NEC)
- Head coach: Jared Grasso (4th season)
- Associate head coach: Phil Martelli, Jr.
- Assistant coaches: Chris Cole; Eamonn Mahar
- Home arena: Chace Athletic Center

2021–22 Northeast Conference men's basketball standings
	Conf.				Overall
Team	W		L	PCT	W		L	PCT
Bryant †	16	–	2	.889	22	–	10	.688
Wagner	15	–	3	.833	21	–	6	.778
LIU	12	–	6	.667	16	–	14	.533
Merrimack*	10	–	8	.556	14	–	16	.467
Mount St. Mary's	9	–	9	.500	14	–	16	.467
St. Francis Brooklyn	7	–	11	.389	10	–	20	.333
Sacred Heart	6	–	12	.333	10	–	20	.333
Saint Francis (PA)	5	–	13	.278	9	–	21	.300
Central Connecticut	5	–	13	.278	8	–	24	.250
Fairleigh Dickinson	5	–	13	.278	4	–	22	.154
† 2022 NEC tournament winner * ineligible for the 2022 NCAA tournament due to transition period

The 2021–22 Bryant Bulldogs men's basketball team represented Bryant University in the 2021–22 NCAA Division I men's basketball season. The Bulldogs, led by fourth-year head coach Jared Grasso, played their home games at the Chace Athletic Center in Smithfield, Rhode Island as members of the Northeast Conference. They finished the season 22–10, 16–2 in NEC play to win the regular season championship. They defeated Central Connecticut, Mount St. Mary's, and Wagner to win the NEC tournament championship. As a result, the Bulldogs received the conference's automatic bid to the NCAA tournament, the school's first-ever trip to the tournament, where they lost to Wright State in the First Four.

Senior guard Peter Kiss led NCAA Division I in scoring with a 25.2 points per game average.

On March 29, 2022, the school announced that the season was the last season for the team in the NEC as they would join the America East Conference on July 1, 2022.

== Previous season ==
In a season limited due to the ongoing COVID-19 pandemic, the Bulldogs finished the 2020–21 season 15–7, 10–4 in NEC play to finish in second place. In the NEC tournament, they defeated Sacred Heart in the semifinals before losing to Mount St. Mary's in the championship game. They received an invitation to the College Basketball Invitational, where they lost in the quarterfinals to Coastal Carolina.

== Roster ==
2021–22 Bryant Bulldogs men's basketball team
Players
Coaches

Pos.	#	Name	Height	Weight	Year	Hometown
G	1	Joe Moon IV	6 ft 2 in (1.88 m)	190 lb (86 kg)	So	Westland, MI
G	2	Erickson Bans	5 ft 11 in (1.8 m)	175 lb (79 kg)	So	Pawtucket, RI
G	3	Adham Eleeda	6 ft 5 in (1.96 m)	210 lb (95 kg)	GS	Toronto, Ontario
G	4	Tyler Brelsford	6 ft 4 in (1.93 m)	183 lb (83 kg)	Fr	Ellicott City, MD
G	5	Charles Pride	6 ft 4 in (1.93 m)	200 lb (91 kg)	Jr	Syracuse, NY
G	10	Luis Hurtado Jr.	6 ft 6 in (1.98 m)	215 lb (98 kg)	GS	Mérida, Venezuela
G	11	Max Zakheim	5 ft 11 in (1.8 m)	157 lb (71 kg)	Fr	Bergenfield, NJ
G	12	Timmy Kiggins	6 ft 0 in (1.83 m)	180 lb (82 kg)	Jr	Westbury, NY
F	13	Mike Marshall Jr.	6 ft 3 in (1.91 m)	185 lb (84 kg)	Fr	Weymouth, MA
F	14	Liam Dunfee	6 ft 6 in (1.98 m)	225 lb (102 kg)	Fr	Nahant, MA
F	15	Greg Calixte	6 ft 8 in (2.03 m)	235 lb (107 kg)	GS	Mount Vernon, NY
F	22	Grant Coleman	6 ft 7 in (2.01 m)	220 lb (100 kg)	RS Fr	Mahomet, IL
G	30	Chris Childs	6 ft 2 in (1.88 m)	185 lb (84 kg)	Sr	Bronx, NY
G	32	Peter Kiss	6 ft 5 in (1.96 m)	200 lb (91 kg)	GS	New York, NY
G	33	Mike Iuzzolino	6 ft 3 in (1.91 m)	180 lb (82 kg)	Fr	Pittsburgh, PA
F	34	Hall Elisias	6 ft 8 in (2.03 m)	230 lb (104 kg)	GS	Valley Stream, NY
F	50	Josh Ozabor	6 ft 5 in (1.96 m)	220 lb (100 kg)	Fr	Johannesburg, South Africa

Head coach

- Jared Grasso (Quinnipiac)

Assistant coach(es)

- Phil Martelli, Jr. (Saint Joseph's)
- Chris Cole (New Mexico State)
- Eamonn Mahar (SUNY Cortland)

Legend

- (C) Team captain
- (S) Suspended
- (I) Ineligible
- (W) Walk-on
- Injured
- Current redshirt

Roster
Last update: December 1, 2021

== Schedule and results ==
NEC COVID-19 policy provided that if a team could not play a conference game due to COVID-19 issues within its program, the game would be declared a forfeit and the other team would receive a conference win. However, wins related to COVID-19 do not count pursuant to NCAA policy.

Date time, TV	Rank^{#}	Opponent^{#}	Result	Record	Site (attendance) city, state
Exhibition
October 25, 2021*; 7:00 pm		Nichols	W 107–71	–	Chace Athletic Center (1,400); Smithfield, RI
Non-conference regular season
November 9, 2021*; 7:30 pm		Fisher	W 122–54	1–0	Chase Athletic Center (1,250); Smithfield, RI
November 12, 2021*; 6:00 pm, ESPN+		at Rhode Island; Sunshine Slam campus game	L 64–83	1–1	Ryan Center (5,455); Kingston, RI
November 15, 2021*; 7:00 pm, ACCNX		at Clemson	L 70–93	1–2	Littlejohn Coliseum (5,411); Clemson, SC
November 20, 2021*; 12:00 pm		vs. Bethune–Cookman; Sunshine Slam Bracket B Semifinals	L 75–81	1–3	Ocean Center; Daytona Beach, FL
November 21, 2021*; 12:00 pm		vs. Holy Cross; Sunshine Slam Bracket B Consolation Game	W 78–62	2–3	Ocean Center; Daytona Beach, FL
November 26, 2021*; 2:00 pm, NESN/ESPN+		at Brown	W 65–59	3–3	Pizzitola Sports Center (874); Providence, RI
November 28, 2021*; 4:00 pm		Dartmouth	L 61–63 ^{OT}	3–4	Chase Athletic Center (759); Smithfield, RI
December 3, 2021*; 8:00 pm, ESPN+		at No. 15 Houston	L 44–111	3–5	Fertitta Center (7,051); Houston, TX
December 5, 2021*; 7:00 pm, ESPN+		at Cincinnati	L 58–73	3–6	Fifth Third Arena (7,924); Cincinnati, OH
December 8, 2021*; 7:30 pm		New Hampshire	W 76–59	4–6	Chase Athletic Center (625); Smithfield, RI
December 11, 2021*; 6:31 pm, SNY/ESPN3		at Stony Brook	L 78–86	4–7	Island Federal Arena (1,930); Stony Brook, NY
December 19, 2021*; 5:30 pm		at Cornell	Canceled due to COVID-19 protocols at Cornell		Newman Arena; Ithaca, NY
December 22, 2021*; 11:00 am		Eastern Kentucky	Canceled due to COVID-19 protocols at Bryant		Chase Athletic Center; Smithfield, RI
NEC regular season
December 29, 2021; 7:00 pm		at Central Connecticut	W 80–76	5–7 (1–0)	William H. Detrick Gymnasium (1,658); New Britain, CT
December 31, 2021; 1:00 pm		Sacred Heart	W 85–82	6–7 (2–0)	Chase Athletic Center (503); Smithfield, RI
January 6, 2022; 7:00 pm, ESPN3/SNY		at Wagner	L 81–84 ^{OT}	6–8 (2–1)	Spiro Sports Center (1,317); Staten Island, NY
January 8, 2022; 2:00 pm		at Fairleigh Dickinson	W 1–0 (Forfeit)	6–8 (3–1)	Rothman Center; Hackensack, NJ
January 15, 2022; 1:00 pm		Mount St. Mary's	W 73–66	7–8 (4–1)	Chase Athletic Center (240); Smithfield, RI
January 17, 2022; 7:00 pm		Saint Francis (PA)	W 82–52	8–8 (5–1)	Chase Athletic Center (600); Smithfield, RI
January 21, 2022; 7:00 pm		at Merrimack	W 79–63	9–8 (6–1)	Hammel Court (893); North Andover, MA
January 23, 2022; 1:00 pm		St. Francis Brooklyn	W 85–68	10–8 (7–1)	Chase Athletic Center (985); Smithfield, RI
January 27, 2022; 7:00 pm		Merrimack	W 76–67	11–8 (8–1)	Chase Athletic Center (1,200); Smithfield, RI
January 30, 2022; 1:00 pm, CBSSN		LIU	W 88–81	12–8 (9–1)	Chase Athletic Center (750); Smithfield, RI
February 3, 2022; 7:00 pm		at Saint Francis (PA)	W 89–82	13–8 (10–1)	DeGol Arena (0); Loretto, PA
February 5, 2022; 4:00 pm, ESPN3		at Mount St. Mary's	W 62–61	14–8 (11–1)	Knott Arena (2,784); Emmitsburg, MD
February 10, 2022; 7:00 pm		at Sacred Heart	W 99–86	15–8 (12–1)	William H. Pitt Center (663); Fairfield, CT
February 12, 2022; 2:00 pm		at LIU	L 88–99	15–9 (12–2)	Steinberg Wellness Center (593); Brooklyn, NY
February 17, 2022; 7:00 pm		Central Connecticut	W 75–61	16–9 (13–2)	Chase Athletic Center (1,575); Smithfield, RI
February 19, 2022; 1:00 pm		Fairleigh Dickinson	W 105–93	17–9 (14–2)	Chase Athletic Center (1,805); Smithfield, RI
February 24, 2022; 7:00 pm		at St. Francis Brooklyn	W 86–69	18–9 (15–2)	Daniel J. Lynch Gym (368); Brooklyn, NY
February 26, 2022; 4:00 pm		Wagner	W 78–70	19–9 (16–2)	Chase Athletic Center (2,650); Smithfield, RI
NEC tournament
March 2, 2022; 7:00 pm, NEC Front Row	(1)	(9) Central Connecticut; Quarterfinals	W 73–59	20–9	Chase Athletic Center (2,650); Smithfield, RI
March 5, 2022; 6:00 pm, ESPN3	(1)	(4) Mount St. Mary's; Semifinals	W 70–69	21–9	Chase Athletic Center (2,650); Smithfield, RI
March 8, 2022; 7:00 pm, ESPN2	(1)	(2) Wagner; Championship	W 70–43	22–9	Chase Athletic Center (2,650); Smithfield, RI
NCAA tournament
March 16, 2022*; 6:40 pm, TruTV	(16 S)	vs. (16 S) Wright State; First Four	L 82–93	22–10	UD Arena (9,999); Dayton, OH
*Non-conference game. ^{#}Rankings from AP Poll. (#) Tournament seedings in parentheses. All times are in Eastern.
