= 2021–22 Saint Francis Red Flash men's basketball team =

American college basketball season

2021–22 Saint Francis Red Flash men's basketball
- Conference: Northeast Conference
- Record: 9–21 (5–13 NEC)
- Head coach: Rob Krimmel (10th season)
- Associate head coach: Andrew Helton
- Assistant coaches: Eric Taylor; Luke McConnell
- Home arena: DeGol Arena

2021–22 Northeast Conference men's basketball standings
	Conf.				Overall
Team	W		L	PCT	W		L	PCT
Bryant †	16	–	2	.889	22	–	10	.688
Wagner	15	–	3	.833	21	–	6	.778
LIU	12	–	6	.667	16	–	14	.533
Merrimack*	10	–	8	.556	14	–	16	.467
Mount St. Mary's	9	–	9	.500	14	–	16	.467
St. Francis Brooklyn	7	–	11	.389	10	–	20	.333
Sacred Heart	6	–	12	.333	10	–	20	.333
Saint Francis (PA)	5	–	13	.278	9	–	21	.300
Central Connecticut	5	–	13	.278	8	–	24	.250
Fairleigh Dickinson	5	–	13	.278	4	–	22	.154
† 2022 NEC tournament winner * ineligible for the 2022 NCAA tournament due to transition period

The 2021–22 Saint Francis Red Flash men's basketball team represented Saint Francis University in the 2021–22 NCAA Division I men's basketball season. The Red Flash, led by eleventh-year head coach Rob Krimmel, played their home games at the DeGol Arena in Loretto, Pennsylvania as members of the Northeast Conference.

== Previous season ==
In a season limited due to the ongoing COVID-19 pandemic, the Red Flash finished the 2020–21 season 6–16, 5–13 in NEC play to finish in a tie for ninth place. Due to complications caused by the pandemic, only the top four teams were eligible to participate in the NEC tournament.

== Roster ==
2021–22 Saint Francis Red Flash men's basketball team
Players
Coaches

Pos.	#	Name	Height	Weight	Year	Previous school	Hometown
G	1	Zahree Harrison	6 ft 0 in (1.83 m)	190 lb (86 kg)	So	Cheltenham	West Philadelphia, PA
G	2	Ramiir Dixon-Conover	6 ft 3 in (1.91 m)	185 lb (84 kg)	RS Sr	Southeastern CC	Newark, NJ
G	3	Luke Ruggery	5 ft 11 in (1.8 m)	160 lb (73 kg)	RS So	Bishop Guilfoyle	Duncansville, PA
G	4	Ronell Giles Jr.	6 ft 4 in (1.93 m)	185 lb (84 kg)	So	Charles Herbert Flowers	Brandywine, MD
F	5	Myles Thompson	6 ft 6 in (1.98 m)	230 lb (104 kg)	Sr	Camden	Camden, NJ
F	11	Maxwell Land	6 ft 4 in (1.93 m)	185 lb (84 kg)	So	Archbishop Moeller	Cincinnati, OH
F	13	Marlon Hargis	6 ft 7 in (2.01 m)	205 lb (93 kg)	Sr	Holy Cross	Mays Landing, NJ
F	15	Chukwu Ikediashi	6 ft 8 in (2.03 m)	220 lb (100 kg)	RS Jr	Hudson Catholic	Hoboken, NJ
G	20	Brendan Scanlon	5 ft 8 in (1.73 m)	155 lb (70 kg)	Fr	Saint Joseph's	State College, PA
G	21	Ben Seidel	6 ft 0 in (1.83 m)	170 lb (77 kg)	Jr	Bishop McCort	Johnstown, PA
G/F	22	Tyler Stewart	6 ft 8 in (2.03 m)	195 lb (88 kg)	RS Sr	Binghamton	Silver Spring, MD
G	23	A.J. Labriola	6 ft 2 in (1.88 m)	185 lb (84 kg)	Sr	Bishop Guilfoyle	Altoona, PA
G	31	Brad McCabe	6 ft 6 in (1.98 m)	185 lb (84 kg)	RS So	Manasquan	Manasquan, NJ
F	32	Jeriah Coleman	7 ft 0 in (2.13 m)	220 lb (100 kg)	So	Great Bridge Christian	Anchorage, AK
F	33	Josh Cohen	6 ft 10 in (2.08 m)	220 lb (100 kg)	RS So	Christian Brothers Academy	Lincroft, NJ
F	42	Mark Flagg	6 ft 9 in (2.06 m)	215 lb (98 kg)	RS Sr	Pennsbury	Fairless Hills, PA

Head coach

- Rob Krimmel (Saint Francis (PA))

Assistant coach(es)

- Andrew Helton (Miami (OH))
- Eric Taylor (Saint Francis (PA))
- Luke McConnell (Saint Francis (PA))

Legend

- (C) Team captain
- (S) Suspended
- (I) Ineligible
- (W) Walk-on
- Injured
- Current redshirt

Roster
Last update: November 30, 2021

== Schedule and results ==
NEC COVID-19 policy provided that if a team could not play a conference game due to COVID-19 issues within its program, the game would be declared a forfeit and the other team would receive a conference win. However, wins related to COVID-19 do not count pursuant to NCAA policy.

Date time, TV	Rank^{#}	Opponent^{#}	Result	Record	Site (attendance) city, state
Non-conference regular season
November 9, 2021*; 8:00 pm, ESPN+		at George Washington	L 72–75	0–1	Charles E. Smith Center (1,821); Washington, D.C.
November 15, 2021*; 7:00 pm		Franciscan	W 100–54	1–1	DeGol Arena (898); Loretto, PA
November 18, 2021*; 8:00 pm, ACCN		at Virginia Tech	L 55–85	1–2	Cassell Coliseum (6,437); Blacksburg, VA
November 24, 2021*; 4:00 pm, ESPN+		at Cornell	L 80–93	1–3	Newman Arena (331); Ithaca, NY
November 28, 2021*; 7:00 pm, ESPN+		at Lehigh	W 79–68	2–3	Stabler Arena (593); Bethlehem, PA
December 1, 2021*; 7:00 pm, NEC Front Row		Bucknell	W 93–67	3–3	DeGol Arena (289); Loretto, PA
December 4, 2021*; 3:30 pm, ESPN+		at Ohio	L 75–78	3–4	Convocation Center (4,371); Athens, OH
December 8, 2021*; 7:00 pm, ESPN+		at American	L 73-83	3–5	Bender Arena (992); Washington, D.C.
December 14, 2021*; 7:00 pm, ESPN3		at Hartford	W 81-66	4–5	Chase Arena (667); West Hartford, CT
December 18, 2021*; 1:00 pm, ESPN+		at Illinois	L 48-106	4–6	State Farm Center (12,302); Champaign, IL
December 22, 2021*; 7:00 pm, NEC Front Row		Robert Morris	L 67–75	4–7	DeGol Arena (224); Loretto, PA
NEC regular season
December 29, 2021; 7:00 pm, NEC Front Row		Wagner	L 64–72	4–8 (0–1)	DeGol Arena (374); Loretto, PA
December 31, 2021; 4:00 pm, NEC Front Row		Fairleigh Dickinson	L 62–70	4–9 (0–2)	DeGol Arena (188); Loretto, PA
January 6, 2022; 7:00 pm		at St. Francis Brooklyn	L 53–70	4–10 (0–3)	Daniel J. Lynch Gym (173); Brooklyn, NY
January 8, 2022; 2:00 pm		at LIU	L 70–75 ^{OT}	4–11 (0–4)	Steinberg Wellness Center (113); Brooklyn, NY
January 15, 2022; 3:00 pm		at Merrimack	W 62–46	5–11 (1–4)	Hammel Court (204); North Andover, MA
January 17, 2022; 7:00 pm		at Bryant	L 52–82	5–12 (1–5)	Chace Athletic Center (600); Smithfield, RI
January 21, 2022; 7:00 pm, ESPN+		Central Connecticut	W 68–67	6–12 (2–5)	DeGol Arena (855); Loretto, PA
January 23, 2022; 4:00 pm		Sacred Heart	W 85–74	7–12 (3–5)	DeGol Arena; Loretto, PA
January 27, 2022; 7:00 pm		at Wagner	L 54–69	7–13 (3–6)	Spiro Sports Center (1,397); Staten Island, NY
January 29, 2022; 5:00 pm		at Mount St. Mary's	L 54–71	7–14 (3–7)	Knott Arena (2,154); Emmitsburg, MD
February 3, 2022; 7:00 pm		Bryant	L 82–89	7–15 (3–8)	DeGol Arena (0); Loretto, PA
February 5, 2022; 2:00 pm		Merrimack	L 64–65 ^{OT}	7–16 (3–9)	DeGol Arena (770); Loretto, PA
February 10, 2022; 7:00 pm		at Fairleigh Dickinson	W 78–65	8–16 (4–9)	Rothman Center (0); Hackensack, NJ
February 12, 2022; 4:00 pm		Mount St. Mary's	L 52–54	8–17 (4–10)	DeGol Arena (799); Loretto, PA
February 17, 2022; 7:00 pm		LIU	L 63–81	8–18 (4–11)	DeGol Arena (640); Loretto, PA
February 19, 2022; 4:00 pm		St. Francis Brooklyn	L 72–80 ^{OT}	8–19 (4–12)	DeGol Arena (818); Loretto, PA
February 24, 2022; 7:00 pm		at Central Connecticut	W 79–63	9–19 (5–12)	William H. Detrick Gymnasium (976); New Britain, CT
February 26, 2022; 2:00 pm		at Sacred Heart	L 68–80	9–20 (5–13)	William H. Pitt Center (1,013); Fairfield, CT
NEC tournament
March 2, 2022; 7:00 pm, NEC Front Row	(7)	at (2) Wagner; Quarterfinals	L 53–82	9–21	Spiro Sports Center (1,811); Staten Island, NY
*Non-conference game. ^{#}Rankings from AP Poll. (#) Tournament seedings in parentheses. All times are in Eastern.
