= 2021–22 Fairleigh Dickinson Knights men's basketball team =

American college basketball season

2021–22 Fairleigh Dickinson Knights men's basketball
- Conference: Northeast Conference
- Record: 4–22 (5–13 NEC)
- Head coach: Greg Herenda (9th season)
- Assistant coaches: Pete Lappas; Brandon Hall
- Home arena: Rothman Center

2021–22 Northeast Conference men's basketball standings
	Conf.				Overall
Team	W		L	PCT	W		L	PCT
Bryant †	16	–	2	.889	22	–	10	.688
Wagner	15	–	3	.833	21	–	6	.778
LIU	12	–	6	.667	16	–	14	.533
Merrimack*	10	–	8	.556	14	–	16	.467
Mount St. Mary's	9	–	9	.500	14	–	16	.467
St. Francis Brooklyn	7	–	11	.389	10	–	20	.333
Sacred Heart	6	–	12	.333	10	–	20	.333
Saint Francis (PA)	5	–	13	.278	9	–	21	.300
Central Connecticut	5	–	13	.278	8	–	24	.250
Fairleigh Dickinson	5	–	13	.278	4	–	22	.154
† 2022 NEC tournament winner * ineligible for the 2022 NCAA tournament due to transition period

The 2021–22 Fairleigh Dickinson Knights men's basketball team represented Fairleigh Dickinson University in the 2021–22 NCAA Division I men's basketball season. The Knights, led by ninth-year head coach Greg Herenda, played their home games at the Rothman Center in Hackensack, New Jersey as members of the Northeast Conference (NEC).

The Knights finished the season 4–22, 5–13 in NEC play, to finish tied for last place. As the No. 8 seed, they were defeated by Central Connecticut in the first round of the NEC tournament.

On April 25, 2022, the school announced that they were parting ways with head coach Greg Herenda after nine years at the position. On May 2, Tobin Anderson, head coach at St. Thomas Aquinas, was named as the Knights' newest head coach.

== Previous season ==
In a season limited due to the ongoing COVID-19 pandemic, the Knights finished the 2020–21 season 9–15, 8–10 in NEC play, to finish in eighth place. They failed to qualify for the NEC tournament.

== Roster ==
2021–22 Fairleigh Dickinson Knights men's basketball team
Players
Coaches

Pos.	#	Name	Height	Weight	Year	Hometown
G	0	Devon Dunn	6 ft 1 in (1.85 m)	175 lb (79 kg)	Jr	Washington, D.C.
G	1	Joe Jr. Munden	6 ft 4 in (1.93 m)	190 lb (86 kg)	So	Harlem, NY
G	2	Brandon Rush	6 ft 3 in (1.91 m)	175 lb (79 kg)	Jr	Warrensville Heights, OH
G	3	Antoine Jacks	5 ft 10 in (1.78 m)	165 lb (75 kg)	Fr	Greenbelt, MD
G	4	Ray Jr. Ford	6 ft 2 in (1.88 m)	188 lb (85 kg)	Fr	Jersey City, NJ
F	5	Ansley Almonor	6 ft 7 in (2.01 m)	215 lb (98 kg)	Fr	Spring Valley, NY
G	10	Sébastien Lamaute	6 ft 2 in (1.88 m)	200 lb (91 kg)	So	Saint-Bruno-de-Montarville, QC
F	11	Ibrahim Wattara	6 ft 5 in (1.96 m)	215 lb (98 kg)	Fr	The Bronx, NY
F	12	Robby Phillips	6 ft 5 in (1.96 m)	200 lb (91 kg)	Fr	Ridgewood, NJ
F	14	Pier-Olivier Racine	6 ft 8 in (2.03 m)	230 lb (104 kg)	So	Gatineau, QC
G	15	Sal Xheraj	6 ft 0 in (1.83 m)	181 lb (82 kg)	Sr	Hasbrouck Heights, NJ
G	20	Brandon Upshaw	5 ft 11 in (1.8 m)	165 lb (75 kg)	Fr	Tarrytown, NY
G	24	Oscar Berry	6 ft 4 in (1.93 m)	190 lb (86 kg)	Fr	Melbourne, Australia
F	25	Daniel Rodriguez	6 ft 6 in (1.98 m)	221 lb (100 kg)	Jr	Newark, NJ
F	32	John Jr. Square	6 ft 6 in (1.98 m)	195 lb (88 kg)	So	North Bethesda, MD
F	35	Anquan Hill	6 ft 9 in (2.06 m)	195 lb (88 kg)	Fr	Philadelphia, PA

Head coach

- Greg Herenda (Merrimack)

Assistant coach(es)

- Pete Lappas (Boston College)
- Brandon Hall (Saint Peter's)

Legend

- (C) Team captain
- (S) Suspended
- (I) Ineligible
- (W) Walk-on
- Injured
- Current redshirt

Roster
Last update: November 13, 2021

== Schedule and results ==
The Knights' game against Drexel scheduled for November 12, 2021 was postponed due to their bus breaking down and being unable to make it to the game.

NEC COVID-19 policy provided that if a team could not play a conference game due to COVID-19 issues within its program, the game would be declared a forfeit and the other team would receive a conference win. However, wins related to COVID-19 do not count pursuant to NCAA policy.

Date time, TV	Rank^{#}	Opponent^{#}	Result	Record	Site (attendance) city, state
Exhibition
November 4, 2021*; 7:00 p.m.		Rutgers–Newark	W 86–61	–	Rothman Center; Hackensack, NJ
Non-conference regular season
November 10, 2021*; 7:00 p.m., FS1		at Seton Hall	L 49–93	0–1	Prudential Center (8,223); Newark, NJ
November 12, 2021*; 5:00 p.m.		at Drexel	Postponed due to transportation issues		Daskalakis Athletic Center; Philadelphia, PA
November 18, 2021*; 9:00 p.m., BTN		at Northwestern	L 46–82	0–2	Welsh–Ryan Arena (2,854); Evanston, IL
November 20, 2021*; 6:00 p.m., FS2		at St. John's	L 74–87	0–3	Carnesecca Arena (3,538); Queens, NY
November 24, 2021*; 2:00 p.m., ESPN3		at NJIT	L 54–62	0–4	Wellness and Events Center (327); Newark, NJ
November 28, 2021*; 4:00 p.m., ESPN+		at Princeton	L 79–89	0–5	Jadwin Gymnasium (1,347); Princeton, NJ
November 30, 2021*; 7:00 p.m., ESPN3		at Manhattan	L 73–78	0–6	Draddy Gymnasium (1,264); Riverdale, NY
December 2, 2021*; 7:00 p.m.		at Drexel	L 65–86	0–7	Daskalakis Athletic Center (852); Philadelphia, PA
December 7, 2021*; 7:00 p.m., ESPN+		at La Salle	L 55–81	0–8	Tom Gola Arena (1,172); Philadelphia, PA
December 15, 2021*; 7:00 p.m., NEC Front Row		Fairfield	L 54–72	0–9	Rothman Center (459); Hackensack, NJ
December 18, 2021*; 2:00 p.m., ACCN		at Virginia	L 49–82	0–10	John Paul Jones Arena (13,197); Charlottesville, VA
December 22, 2021*; 3:00 p.m., NEC Front Row		Saint Peter's	Canceled due to COVID-19 issues		Rothman Center; Hackensack, NJ
NEC regular season
December 29, 2021; 7:00 p.m.		at Mount St. Mary's	W 1–0 (Forfeit)	0–10 (1–0)	Knott Arena; Emmitsburg, MD
December 31, 2021; 4:00 p.m.		at Saint Francis (PA)	W 70–62	1–10 (2–0)	DeGol Arena (188); Loretto, PA
January 6, 2022; 7:00 p.m., NEC Front Row		Merrimack	L 0–1 (Forfeit)	1–10 (2–1)	Rothman Center; Hackensack, NJ
January 8, 2022; 2:00 p.m., NEC Front Row		Bryant	L 0–1 (Forfeit)	1–10 (2–2)	Rothman Center; Hackensack, NJ
January 15, 2022; 2:00 p.m.		at Sacred Heart	L 71–77	1–11 (2–3)	William H. Pitt Center (413); Fairfield, CT
January 17, 2022; 7:00 p.m.		at Wagner	L 64–95	1–12 (2–4)	Spiro Sports Center (1,228); Staten Island, NY
January 21, 2022; 7:00 p.m., NEC Front Row		St. Francis Brooklyn	L 78–80	1–13 (2–5)	Rothman Center (140); Hackensack, NJ
January 23, 2022; 7:00 p.m., NEC Front Row		LIU	L 75–79	1–14 (2–6)	Rothman Center (107); Hackensack, NJ
January 27, 2022; 7:00 p.m., NEC Front Row		Mount St. Mary's	L 56–67	1–15 (2–7)	Rothman Center (137); Hackensack, NJ
January 29, 2022; 2:00 p.m., NEC Front Row		Central Connecticut	W 75–55	2–15 (3–7)	Rothman Center (519); Hackensack, NJ
February 3, 2022; 7:00 p.m.		at St. Francis Brooklyn	L 64–81	2–16 (3–8)	Daniel Lynch Gymnasium (346); Brooklyn, NY
February 5, 2022; 1:00 p.m.		at Central Connecticut	L 82–91 ^{OT}	2–17 (3–9)	William H. Detrick Gymnasium (1,021); New Britain, CT
February 10, 2022; 7:00 p.m., NEC Front Row		Saint Francis (PA)	L 65–78	2–18 (3–10)	Rothman Center (321); Hackensack, NJ
February 12, 2022; 1:00 p.m., NEC Front Row		Sacred Heart	W 82–75	3–18 (4–10)	Rothman Center (375); Hackensack, NJ
February 17, 2022; 7:00 p.m.		at Merrimack	L 44–64	3–19 (4–11)	Hammel Court (606); North Andover, MA
February 19, 2022; 1:00 p.m.		at Bryant	L 93–105	3–20 (4–12)	Chace Athletic Center (1,805); Smithfield, RI
February 24, 2022; 7:00 p.m., NEC Front Row		Wagner	W 88–86 ^{OT}	4–20 (5–12)	Rothman Center (859); Hackensack, NJ
February 26, 2022; 2:00 p.m., NEC Front Row		at LIU	L 77–84	4–21 (5–13)	Steinberg Wellness Center (524); Brooklyn, NY
NEC tournament
February 28, 2022; 7:00 p.m., NEC Front Row	(8)	(9) Central Connecticut; Opening round	L 66–67	4–22	Rothman Center; Hackensack, NJ
*Non-conference game. ^{#}Rankings from AP poll. (#) Tournament seedings in parentheses. All times are in Eastern.
