= 2021–22 Merrimack Warriors men's basketball team =

American college basketball season

2021–22 Merrimack Warriors men's basketball

The Basketball Classic, Withdrew
- Conference: Northeast Conference
- Record: 14–16 (10–8 NEC)
- Head coach: Joe Gallo (6th season)
- Assistant coaches: Micky Burtnyk (13th season); Phil Gaetano (4th season)
- Home arena: Hammel Court

2021–22 Northeast Conference men's basketball standings
	Conf.				Overall
Team	W		L	PCT	W		L	PCT
Bryant †	16	–	2	.889	22	–	10	.688
Wagner	15	–	3	.833	21	–	6	.778
LIU	12	–	6	.667	16	–	14	.533
Merrimack*	10	–	8	.556	14	–	16	.467
Mount St. Mary's	9	–	9	.500	14	–	16	.467
St. Francis Brooklyn	7	–	11	.389	10	–	20	.333
Sacred Heart	6	–	12	.333	10	–	20	.333
Saint Francis (PA)	5	–	13	.278	9	–	21	.300
Central Connecticut	5	–	13	.278	8	–	24	.250
Fairleigh Dickinson	5	–	13	.278	4	–	22	.154
† 2022 NEC tournament winner * ineligible for the 2022 NCAA tournament due to transition period

The 2021–22 Merrimack Warriors men's basketball team represented Merrimack College in the 2021–22 NCAA Division I men's basketball season. The Warriors, led by fourth-year head coach Joe Gallo, played their home games at Hammel Court in North Andover, Massachusetts as members of the Northeast Conference. They finished the season 14–16, 10–8 in NEC play to finish in fourth place.

The Warriors, in their third year of a transition to Division I, were ineligible for the NEC tournament and the NCAA tournament. They received an invitation to play in The Basketball Classic, formerly known as the CollegeInsider.com Tournament, but their opponent, UMBC, withdrew from the tournament and the Warriors were unable to play as a result.

== Previous season ==
In a season limited due to the ongoing COVID-19 pandemic, the Warriors finished their conference-only schedule for the 2020–21 season 9–9 in NEC play to finish in a tie for fifth place. As they were in the third year of their four-year transition from Division II to Division I, they were ineligible to participate in the NEC tournament.

== Roster ==
2021–22 Merrimack Warriors men's basketball team
Players
Coaches

Pos.	#	Name	Height	Weight	Year	Hometown
G	0	Malik Edmead	5 ft 10 in (1.78 m)	165 lb (75 kg)	So	Deer Park, New York
G	1	Khalief Crawford	6 ft 1 in (1.85 m)	195 lb (88 kg)	GS	Linden, New Jersey
G	3	Mykel Derring	6 ft 2 in (1.88 m)	180 lb (82 kg)	Jr	Boston, Massachusetts
G	5	Mikey Watkins	5 ft 11 in (1.8 m)	175 lb (79 kg)	Sr	Roselle, New Jersey
G	11	Ryan Miller	6 ft 2 in (1.88 m)	195 lb (88 kg)	Sr	Weston, Massachusetts
G	12	Thomas Hall	6 ft 4 in (1.93 m)	195 lb (88 kg)	Fr	Nanuet, New York
G	13	James Berry III	6 ft 5 in (1.96 m)	175 lb (79 kg)	So	Clinton, Maryland
G/F	14	Devin Jensen	6 ft 5 in (1.96 m)	220 lb (100 kg)	GS	Brielle, New Jersey
F	15	Ryan Isaacson	6 ft 8 in (2.03 m)	200 lb (91 kg)	So	Willowbrook, Illinois
G	20	Nick Filchner	6 ft 7 in (2.01 m)	200 lb (91 kg)	Fr	Northampton, Pennsylvania
F	22	Jordan Minor	6 ft 8 in (2.03 m)	240 lb (109 kg)	Jr	Kingston, Massachusetts
G/F	23	Ziggy Reid	6 ft 6 in (1.98 m)	235 lb (107 kg)	Jr	Baltimore, Maryland
G	24	Jordan McKoy	6 ft 5 in (1.96 m)	180 lb (82 kg)	Jr	Westwood, New Jersey
F	31	Justin Connolly	6 ft 7 in (2.01 m)	210 lb (95 kg)	Sr	Melrose, Massachusetts
F		Joshua Chesney	6 ft 5 in (1.96 m)	190 lb (86 kg)	Fr	Corpus Christi, Texas

Head coach

- Joe Gallo (Merrimack)

Assistant coach(es)

- Micky Burtnyk (Merrimack)
- Phil Gaetano (Sacred Heart)

Legend

- (C) Team captain
- (S) Suspended
- (I) Ineligible
- (W) Walk-on
- Injured
- Current redshirt

Roster
Last update: December 2, 2021

== Schedule and results ==
NEC COVID-19 policy provided that if a team could not play a conference game due to COVID-19 issues within its program, the game would be declared a forfeit and the other team would receive a conference win. However, wins related to COVID-19 do not count pursuant to NCAA policy.

Date time, TV	Rank^{#}	Opponent^{#}	Result	Record	Site (attendance) city, state
Non-conference regular season
November 9, 2021*; 7:00 pm		Emerson	W 77–48	1–0	Hammel Court (1,146); North Andover, MA
November 11, 2021*; 7:00 pm, ESPN3		at NJIT	W 61–54	2–0	Wellness and Events Center (557); Newark, NJ
November 13, 2021*; 2:00 pm, BTN+		at Rutgers	L 35–48	2–1	Jersey Mike's Arena (8,000); Piscataway, NJ
November 17, 2021*; 6:00 pm, ESPN+		at Army	L 51–74	2–2	Christl Arena (527); West Point, NY
November 19, 2021*; 7:00 pm		Lehigh	W 55–45	3–2	Lawler Arena (3,000); North Andover, MA
November 21, 2021*; 4:00 pm, ACCNX		at Virginia Tech	L 43–72	3–3	Cassell Coliseum (4,730); Blacksburg, VA
November 23, 2021*; 7:00 pm		Hartford	W 75–60	4–3	Hammel Court (575); North Andover, MA
November 28, 2021*; 1:00 pm, ESPN+		at Boston University	L 60–61	4–4	Case Gym (548); Boston, MA
December 4, 2021*; 7:00 pm, NEC Front Row		UMass Lowell	L 57–61	4–5	Lawler Arena (2,632); North Andover, MA
December 7, 2021*; 7:00 pm		Brown	L 56–76	4–6	Hammel Court (637); North Andover, MA
December 9, 2021*; 9:00 pm		at No. 5 Gonzaga	L 55–80	4–7	McCarthey Athletic Center (6,000); Spokane, WA
December 12, 2021*; 12:00 pm, BTN		at Indiana	L 49-81	4–8	Simon Skjodt Assembly Hall (17,222); Bloomington, IN
December 21, 2021*; 5:00 pm, ESPN3		at Maine	W 49–47	5–8	Cross Insurance Center (453); Bangor, ME
NEC regular season
December 29, 2021; 7:00 pm		St. Francis Brooklyn	W 74–64	6–8 (1–0)	Hammel Court (282); North Andover, MA
December 31, 2021; 2:00 pm		LIU	W 82–77	7–8 (2–0)	Hammel Court (170); North Andover, MA
January 6, 2022; 7:00 pm		at Fairleigh Dickinson	W 1–0 (Forfeit)	7–8 (3–0)	Rothman Center; Hackensack, NJ
January 8, 2022; 1:00 pm		at Central Connecticut	W 66–57	8–8 (4–0)	William H. Detrick Gymnasium; New Britain, CT
January 15, 2022; 3:00 pm		Saint Francis (PA)	L 46–62	8–9 (4–1)	Hammel Court (204); North Andover, MA
January 17, 2022; 7:00 pm		Mount St. Mary's	L 50–57	8–10 (4–2)	Hammel Court (242); North Andover, MA
January 21, 2022; 7:00 pm		Bryant	L 63–79	8–11 (4–3)	Hammel Court (893); North Andover, MA
January 23, 2022; 3:00 pm		Wagner	L 57–71	8–12 (4–4)	Hammel Court (723); North Andover, MA
January 27, 2022; 7:00 pm		at Bryant	L 67–76	8–13 (4–5)	Chace Athletic Center (1,200); Smithfield, RI
February 3, 2022; 7:00 pm		at Mount St. Mary's	L 53–69	8–14 (4–6)	Knott Arena (1,739); Emmitsburg, MD
February 5, 2022; 2:00 pm		at Saint Francis (PA)	W 65–64 ^{OT}	9–14 (5–6)	DeGol Arena (770); Loretto, PA
February 10, 2022; 7:00 pm		Central Connecticut	L 57–60	9–15 (5–7)	Hammel Court (734); North Andover, MA
February 12, 2022; 1:00 pm		at Wagner	W 80–65 ^{OT}	10–15 (6–7)	Spiro Sports Center (1,379); Staten Island, NY
February 15, 2022; 7:00 pm		at Sacred Heart; Rescheduled from January 29	W 70–63	11–15 (7–7)	William H. Pitt Center (383); Fairfield, CT
February 17, 2022; 7:00 pm		Fairleigh Dickinson	W 64–44	12–15 (8–7)	Hammel Court (606); North Andover, MA
February 19, 2022; 3:00 pm		Sacred Heart	W 80–79	13–15 (9–7)	Hammel Court (1,406); North Andover, MA
February 24, 2022; 7:00 pm		at LIU	L 74–85	13–16 (9–8)	Steinberg Wellness Center (375); Brooklyn, NY
February 26, 2022; 4:00 pm		at St. Francis Brooklyn	W 72–52	14–16 (10–8)	Daniel J. Lynch Gym (305); Brooklyn, NY
The Basketball Classic
March 16, 2022*; 7:00 pm, ESPN+		at UMBC; First Round	Canceled due to UMBC withdrawing for health concerns		Chesapeake Employers Insurance Arena; Catonsville, MD
*Non-conference game. ^{#}Rankings from AP Poll. (#) Tournament seedings in parentheses. All times are in Eastern.
