= 2021–22 St. Francis Brooklyn Terriers men's basketball team =

American college basketball season

2021–22 St. Francis Brooklyn Terriers men's basketball
- Conference: Northeast Conference
- Record: 10–20 (7–11 NEC)
- Head coach: Glenn Braica (12th season)
- Associate head coach: Clive Bentick (3rd season, 15th overall season)
- Assistant coaches: Ron Ganulin (9th season); Jonathan Blount (2nd season)
- Home arena: Daniel Lynch Gymnasium

2021–22 Northeast Conference men's basketball standings
	Conf.				Overall
Team	W		L	PCT	W		L	PCT
Bryant †	16	–	2	.889	22	–	10	.688
Wagner	15	–	3	.833	21	–	6	.778
LIU	12	–	6	.667	16	–	14	.533
Merrimack*	10	–	8	.556	14	–	16	.467
Mount St. Mary's	9	–	9	.500	14	–	16	.467
St. Francis Brooklyn	7	–	11	.389	10	–	20	.333
Sacred Heart	6	–	12	.333	10	–	20	.333
Saint Francis (PA)	5	–	13	.278	9	–	21	.300
Central Connecticut	5	–	13	.278	8	–	24	.250
Fairleigh Dickinson	5	–	13	.278	4	–	22	.154
† 2022 NEC tournament winner * ineligible for the 2022 NCAA tournament due to transition period

The 2021–22 St. Francis Brooklyn Terriers men's basketball team represented St. Francis College in the 2021–22 NCAA Division I men's basketball season. The Terriers, led by 12th-year head coach Glenn Braica, played their home games at Daniel Lynch Gymnasium in Brooklyn Heights, New York as members of the Northeast Conference (NEC).

== Previous season ==
In a season limited due to the ongoing COVID-19 pandemic, the Terriers finished the 2020–21 season 9–10, 9–9 in NEC play, to finish in eighth place. Due to complications caused by the COVID-19 pandemic, only the top four teams were eligible to participate in the NEC tournament. Therefore, they failed to qualify.

== Roster ==
2021–22 St. Francis Brooklyn Terriers men's basketball team
Players
Coaches

Pos.	#	Name	Height	Weight	Year	Previous school	Hometown
G	0	Tedrick Jr. Wilcox	6 ft 6 in (1.98 m)	188 lb (85 kg)	Jr	Dominican	Pawtucket, RI
F	1	Patrick Emilien	6 ft 7 in (2.01 m)	210 lb (95 kg)	GS	Western Michigan	Toronto, ON
G	3	Rob Higgins	6 ft 1 in (1.85 m)	179 lb (81 kg)	Jr	Middletown North	Middletown, NJ
G	5	Larry Moreno	6 ft 0 in (1.83 m)	176 lb (80 kg)	Jr	Brooklyn High School for Law and Technology	Brooklyn, NY
G	10	Di'Andre Howell-South	6 ft 4 in (1.93 m)	200 lb (91 kg)	Fr	Immaculate Conception	Paterson, NJ
G	11	Michael Cubbage	6 ft 4 in (1.93 m)	186 lb (84 kg)	GS	Marist	Sicklerville, NJ
F	12	Vuk Stevanic	6 ft 8 in (2.03 m)	228 lb (103 kg)	Sr	Highland	Jagodina, Serbia
G	13	Nick Folk	6 ft 0 in (1.83 m)	160 lb (73 kg)	Fr	Xaverian	Coney Island, NY
F	14	Max Egner	6 ft 6 in (1.98 m)	209 lb (95 kg)	Fr	Brewster Academy	Woodside, NY
G	15	Trey Quartlebaum	6 ft 2 in (1.88 m)	187 lb (85 kg)	Jr	Lawrence	Lawrence, KS
F	20	Elijah Hardison	6 ft 7 in (2.01 m)	225 lb (102 kg)	So	Xaverian	Brooklyn, NY
G	21	Cameron Jones	6 ft 1 in (1.85 m)	170 lb (77 kg)	Fr	IMG Academy	Hudson, NH
F	23	Michael Parrotta	6 ft 5 in (1.96 m)	200 lb (91 kg)	Fr	St. Thomas More	Armonk, NY
G	24	Bahaïde Haïdara	6 ft 6 in (1.98 m)	200 lb (91 kg)	Jr	George Mason	Montreal, QC
G	25	Matthew Gonzalez	6 ft 2 in (1.88 m)	160 lb (73 kg)	Fr	Xaverian	Brooklyn, NY
G	31	Kasper Suurorg	6 ft 6 in (1.98 m)	181 lb (82 kg)	Fr	Audentese e-gymnasium	Tallinn, Estonia
F	32	Jack Hemphill	6 ft 9 in (2.06 m)	230 lb (104 kg)	GS	Boston University	Raleigh, NC

Head coach

- Glenn Braica (Queens College)

Assistant coach(es)

- Clive Bentick (Canisius)
- Ron Ganulin (LIU)
- Jonathan Blount (Queens College)

Legend

- (C) Team captain
- (S) Suspended
- (I) Ineligible
- (W) Walk-on
- Injured
- Current redshirt

Roster
Last update: December 4, 2021

== Schedule and results ==
NEC COVID-19 policy provided that if a team could not play a conference game due to COVID-19 issues within its program, the game would be declared a forfeit and the other team would receive a conference win. However, wins related to COVID-19 do not count pursuant to NCAA policy.

Date time, TV	Rank^{#}	Opponent^{#}	Result	Record	High points	High rebounds	High assists	Site (attendance) city, state
Non-conference regular season
November 9, 2021*; 7:00 p.m.		at Wisconsin	L 58–81	0–1	18 – Emilien	7 – Cubbage	2 – tied	Kohl Center (15,735); Madison, WI
November 13, 2021*; 2:00 p.m.		St. Thomas	L 73–91	0–2	20 – Cubbage	7 – Cubbage	4 – Higgins	Daniel Lynch Gymnasium (212); Brooklyn Heights, NY
November 18, 2021*; 7:00 p.m., BTN+		at Penn State; Emerald Coast Classic campus-site game	L 59–74	0–3	16 – Emilien	6 – Emilien	3 – Higgins	Bryce Jordan Center (7,769); University Park, PA
November 23, 2021*; 7:00 p.m., FS2		at St. John's	L 70–76	0–4	19 – Wilcox Jr.	12 – Emilien	5 – Cubbage	Carnesecca Arena (3,415); Queens, NY
November 26, 2021*; 12:00 p.m.		vs. McNeese State; Emerald Coast Classic second round	L 59–71	0–5	19 – Cubbage	11 – Wilcox Jr.	5 – Stevanic	Raider Arena (250); Niceville, FL
November 27, 2021*; 11:00 a.m.		vs. North Carolina A&T; Emerald Coast Classic consolation game	L 67–73	0–6	14 – Emilien	7 – Haïdara	3 – Stevanic	Raider Arena (100); Niceville, FL
December 1, 2021*; 7:00 p.m., SNY		at Fordham	L 46–68	0–7	13 – tied	9 – Cubbage	3 – tied	Rose Hill Gymnasium (845); The Bronx, NY
December 5, 2021*; 2:00 p.m., NEC Front Row		Hartford	L 55–68	0–8	13 – Quartlebaum	8 – Emilien	2 – tied	Daniel Lynch Gymnasium; Brooklyn Heights, NY
December 8, 2021*; 7:00 p.m., ESPN+		at Saint Peter's	W 71–60	1–8	18 – Moreno	11 – Cubbage	4 – Higgins	Yanitelli Center (464); Jersey City, NJ
December 11, 2021*; 1:00 p.m.		at Delaware State	W 75–61	2–8	17 – Higgins	7 – Emilien	5 – Stevanic	Memorial Hall (435); Dover, DE
December 14, 2021*; 7:00 p.m., NEC Front Row		Medgar Evers	W 113–51	3–8	19 – tied	14 – Egner	4 – Suurorg	Daniel Lynch Gymnasium (310); Brooklyn Heights, NY
December 19, 2021*; 12:30 p.m., NEC Front Row		Longwood	Postponed due to COVID-19 issues					Daniel Lynch Gymnasium; Brooklyn Heights, NY
December 23, 2021*; 7:00 p.m., ESPN3		at UMass Lowell	Canceled due to COVID-19 issues					Costello Athletic Center; Lowell, MA
NEC regular season
December 29, 2021; 7:00 p.m., NEC Front Row		at Merrimack	L 64–74	3–9 (0–1)	18 – Higgins	12 – Wilcox Jr.	4 – Moreno	Hammel Court (282); North Andover, MA
December 31, 2021; 4:00 p.m., NEC Front Row		Central Connecticut	L 55–67	3–10 (0–2)	27 – Wilcox Jr.	6 – Wilcox Jr.	4 – Haïdara	Daniel Lynch Gymnasium (220); Brooklyn Heights, NY
January 6, 2022; 7:00 p.m., NEC Front Row		Saint Francis (PA)	W 70–53	4–10 (1–2)	19 – Cubbage	11 – Emilen	6 – Cubbage	Daniel Lynch Gymnasium (173); Brooklyn Heights, NY
January 8, 2022; 4:00 p.m., NEC Front Row		Mount St. Mary's	L 61–69	4–11 (1–3)	13 – Higgins	10 – Emilien	2 – Cubbage	Daniel Lynch Gymnasium (187); Brooklyn Heights, NY
January 15, 2022; 1:00 p.m., NEC Front Row		at Wagner	L 76–81	4–12 (1–4)	23 – Emilien	8 – Wilcox Jr.	4 – Hemphill	Spiro Sports Center (1,281); Staten Island, NY
January 17, 2022; NEC Front Row		LIU; Battle of Brooklyn	L 65–80	4–13 (1–5)	13 – Moreno	8 – Wilcox Jr.	5 – Cubbage	Daniel Lynch Gymnasium (325); Brooklyn Heights, NY
January 21, 2022; 7:00 p.m., NEC Front Row		at Fairleigh Dickinson	W 80–78	5–13 (2–5)	15 – Emilien	7 – tied	5 – Higgins	Rothman Center (140); Hackensack, NJ
January 23, 2022; 1:00 p.m., NEC Front Row		at Bryant	L 68–85	5–14 (2–6)	17 – Emilien	13 – Wilcox Jr.	8 – Higgins	Chace Athletic Center (985); Smithfield, RI
January 27, 2022; 7:00 p.m., NEC Front Row		at Sacred Heart	W 71–66	6–14 (3–6)	21 – Cubbage	7 – Hemphill	6 – Higgins	William H. Pitt Center (413); Fairfield, CT
January 29, 2022; 4:00 p.m., NEC Front Row		Wagner	L 69–72	6–15 (3–7)	15 – Wilcox Jr.	8 – Wilcox Jr.	4 – Wilcox Jr.	Daniel Lynch Gymnasium (357); Brooklyn Heights, NY
February 3, 2022; 7:00 p.m., ESPN+		Fairleigh Dickinson	W 81–64	7–15 (4–7)	20 – tied	11 – Cubbage	3 – tied	Daniel Lynch Gymnasium (346); Brooklyn Heights, NY
February 5, 2022; 4:00 p.m., NEC Front Row		Sacred Heart	L 62–66 ^{OT}	7–16 (4–8)	20 – Cubbage	9 – Cubbage	4 – Higgins	Daniel Lynch Gymnasium (357); Brooklyn Heights, NY
February 10, 2022; 7:00 p.m., NEC Front Row		at LIU; Battle of Brooklyn	L 69–74	7–17 (4–9)	10 – Higgins	7 – Wilcox	2 – tied	Steinberg Wellness Center (226); Brooklyn, NY
February 12, 2022; 1:00 p.m., NEC Front Row		at Central Connecticut	W 67–50	8–17 (5–9)	23 – Moreno	7 – Emilien	3 – Higgins	William H. Detrick Gymnasium (825); New Britain, CT
February 17, 2022; 7:00 p.m., NEC Front Row		at Mount St. Mary's	W 64–55	9–17 (6–9)	27 – Higgins	5 – tied	3 – Higgins	Knott Arena (1,792); Emmitsburg, MD
February 19, 2022; 4:00 p.m., NEC Front Row		at Saint Francis (PA)	W 80–72 ^{OT}	10–17 (7–9)	21 – Emilien	10 – Cubbage	4 – Higgins	DeGol Arena (818); Loretto, PA
February 24, 2022; 7:00 p.m., NEC Front Row		Bryant	L 69–86	10–18 (7–10)	16 – tied	4 – tied	3 – Higgins	Daniel Lynch Gymnasium (368); Brooklyn Heights, NY
February 26, 2022; 4:00 p.m., NEC Front Row		Merrimack	L 52–72	10–19 (7–11)	15 – Cubbage	9 – Cubbage	3 – Cubbage	Daniel Lynch Gymnasium (305); Brooklyn Heights, NY
NEC tournament
March 2, 2022; 7:00 p.m., NEC Front Row	(5)	at (4) Mount St. Mary's; Quarterfinals	L 48–78	10–20	12 – Higgins	7 – Cubbage	4 – Higgins	Knott Arena (2,274); Emmitsburg, MD
*Non-conference game. ^{#}Rankings from AP poll. (#) Tournament seedings in parentheses. All times are in Eastern.
