= 2021–22 Sacred Heart Pioneers men's basketball team =

American college basketball season

2021–22 Sacred Heart Pioneers men's basketball
- Conference: Northeast Conference
- Record: 10–20 (6–12 NEC)
- Head coach: Anthony Latina (9th season)
- Assistant coaches: Johnny Kidd; Kevin Papacs; Kyle Steinway
- Home arena: William H. Pitt Center

2021–22 Northeast Conference men's basketball standings
	Conf.				Overall
Team	W		L	PCT	W		L	PCT
Bryant †	16	–	2	.889	22	–	10	.688
Wagner	15	–	3	.833	21	–	6	.778
LIU	12	–	6	.667	16	–	14	.533
Merrimack*	10	–	8	.556	14	–	16	.467
Mount St. Mary's	9	–	9	.500	14	–	16	.467
St. Francis Brooklyn	7	–	11	.389	10	–	20	.333
Sacred Heart	6	–	12	.333	10	–	20	.333
Saint Francis (PA)	5	–	13	.278	9	–	21	.300
Central Connecticut	5	–	13	.278	8	–	24	.250
Fairleigh Dickinson	5	–	13	.278	4	–	22	.154
† 2022 NEC tournament winner * ineligible for the 2022 NCAA tournament due to transition period

The 2021–22 Sacred Heart Pioneers men's basketball team represented Sacred Heart University in the 2021–22 NCAA Division I men's basketball season. The Pioneers, led by ninth-year head coach Anthony Latina, played their home games at the William H. Pitt Center in Fairfield, Connecticut as members of the Northeast Conference (NEC).

The Pioneers finished the season 10–20, 6–12 in NEC play, to finish in seventh place. They lost in the quarterfinals of the NEC tournament to LIU.

== Previous season ==
In a season limited due to the ongoing COVID-19 pandemic, the Pioneers finished the 2020–21 season 9–9, 9–7 in NEC play, to finish in a tie for third place. Due to complications caused by the pandemic, only the top four teams were eligible to participate in the NEC tournament. The Pioneers lost to Bryant in the semifinals.

== Roster ==
2021–22 Sacred Heart Pioneers men's basketball team
Players
Coaches

Pos.	#	Name	Height	Weight	Year	Hometown
G	0	Aaron Clarke	6 ft 1 in (1.85 m)	185 lb (84 kg)	Sr	Parsippany, NJ
F	1	Kasparas Jonauskas	6 ft 6 in (1.98 m)	187 lb (85 kg)	So	Kretinga, Lithuania
G	2	Kenneth Womack	5 ft 11 in (1.8 m)	186 lb (84 kg)	So	Upper Marlboro, MD
G	3	Mike Sixsmith	6 ft 0 in (1.83 m)	170 lb (77 kg)	So	Hicksville, NY
G	4	Alex Watson	6 ft 3 in (1.91 m)	170 lb (77 kg)	GS	Marietta, GA
F	5	Zach Pfaffenberger	6 ft 8 in (2.03 m)	215 lb (98 kg)	Sr	Midlothian, VA
G	10	Dom Mello	6 ft 0 in (1.83 m)	165 lb (75 kg)	Fr	Wareham, MA
G	11	Quest Harris	5 ft 11 in (1.8 m)	185 lb (84 kg)	So	Lowell, MA
G	12	Joey Reilly	6 ft 2 in (1.88 m)	170 lb (77 kg)	So	Cromwell, CT
G	13	Najee Coursey	6 ft 6 in (1.98 m)	175 lb (79 kg)	Fr	Galloway, NJ
F	15	Raymond Espinal-Guzman	6 ft 8 in (2.03 m)	190 lb (86 kg)	Fr	Cranston, RI
F	21	Bryce Johnson	6 ft 6 in (1.98 m)	210 lb (95 kg)	So	Stockton, CA
G	22	Tyler Thomas	6 ft 3 in (1.91 m)	195 lb (88 kg)	Jr	New Haven, CT
F	23	Matas Spokas	6 ft 7 in (2.01 m)	195 lb (88 kg)	So	Kaunas, Lithuania
G	24	Tommaso Ferraresi	6 ft 4 in (1.93 m)	190 lb (86 kg)	So	Venice, Italy
F	25	Tanner Thomas	6 ft 6 in (1.98 m)	205 lb (93 kg)	Fr	Springfield, MA
F	30	Cantavio Dutreil	6 ft 7 in (2.01 m)	210 lb (95 kg)	Sr	Gonaïves, Haiti
F	45	Nico Galette	6 ft 6 in (1.98 m)	210 lb (95 kg)	So	Rahway, NJ

Head coach

- Anthony Latina (Brandeis)

Assistant coach(es)

- Johnny Kidd (Central Connecticut State)
- Kevin Papacs (Central Connecticut State)
- Kyle Steinway (Providence)

Legend

- (C) Team captain
- (S) Suspended
- (I) Ineligible
- (W) Walk-on
- Injured
- Current redshirt

Roster
Last update: November 27, 2021

== Schedule and results ==
NEC COVID-19 policy provided that if a team could not play a conference game due to COVID-19 issues within its program, the game would be declared a forfeit and the other team would receive a conference win. However, wins related to COVID-19 do not count pursuant to NCAA policy.

Date time, TV	Rank^{#}	Opponent^{#}	Result	Record	Site (attendance) city, state
Non-conference regular season
November 9, 2021*; 8:00 p.m., ESPN+		at La Salle	W 86–81 ^{OT}	1–0	Tom Gola Arena (1,637); Philadelphia, PA
November 11, 2021*; 6:30 p.m., FS1		at Providence	L 64–92	1–1	Dunkin' Donuts Center (9,716); Providence, RI
November 14, 2021*; 1:00 p.m.		Binghamton	L 60–72	1–2	William H. Pitt Center (873); Fairfield, CT
November 16, 2021*; 7:00 p.m.		Fisher College	W 109–49	2–2	William H. Pitt Center (813); Fairfield, CT
November 20, 2021*; 8:00 p.m.		Fairfield	L 61–71	2–3	William H. Pitt Center (3,873); Fairfield, CT
November 22, 2021*; 6:31 p.m., ESPN3		at Stony Brook	L 72–75	2–4	Island Federal Arena (2,403); Stony Brook, NY
November 30, 2021*; 7:00 p.m., ESPN3		at NJIT	L 70–75	2–5	Wellness and Events Center (311); Newark, NJ
December 2, 2021*; 7:00 p.m.		at Lafayette	W 74–67	3–5	Kirby Sports Center (1,505); Easton, PA
December 5, 2021*; 2:00 p.m., ESPN+		at Brown	L 66–79	3–6	Pizzitola Sports Center (415); Providence, RI
December 7, 2021*; 6:00 p.m., ESPN+		at Rhode Island	L 62–72	3–7	Ryan Center (4,928); Kingston, RI
December 13, 2021*; 8:00 p.m., ESPN+		at Columbia	W 79–69	4–7	Levien Gymnasium (553); New York, NY
December 19, 2021*; 2:00 p.m., ESPN3		at UMass Lowell	L 62–70	4–8	Tsongas Center (812); Lowell, MA
December 22, 2021*; 11:00 a.m., ESPN+		Hartford	L 71–78	4–9	William H. Pitt Center (434); Fairfield, CT
NEC regular season
December 29, 2021; 7:00 p.m.		LIU	W 69–65	5–9 (1–0)	William H. Pitt Center (504); Fairfield, CT
December 31, 2021; 1:00 p.m.		at Bryant	L 82–85	5–10 (1–1)	Chace Athletic Center (503); Smithfield, RI
January 6, 2022; 7:00 p.m.		at Central Connecticut	L 0–1 (Forfeit)	5–10 (1–2)	William H. Detrick Gymnasium; New Britain, CT
January 8, 2022; 1:00 p.m.		at Wagner	L 0–1 (Forfeit)	5–10 (1–3)	Spiro Sports Center; Staten Island, NY
January 15, 2022; 2:00 p.m.		Fairleigh Dickinson	W 77–71	6–10 (2–3)	William H. Pitt Center (413); Fairfield, CT
January 17, 2022; 7:00 p.m.		Central Connecticut	W 74–66	7–10 (3–3)	William H. Pitt Center (563); Fairfield, CT
January 21, 2022; 7:00 p.m.		at Mount St. Mary's	L 59–98	7–11 (3–4)	Knott Arena (1,864); Emmitsburg, MD
January 23, 2022; 4:00 p.m.		at Saint Francis (PA)	L 74–85	7–12 (3–5)	DeGol Arena (0); Loretto, PA
January 27, 2022; 7:00 p.m.		St. Francis Brooklyn	L 66–71	7–13 (3–6)	William H. Pitt Center (413); Fairfield, CT
February 3, 2022; 7:00 p.m.		at LIU	L 75–79	7–14 (3–7)	Steinberg Wellness Center (164); Brooklyn, NY
February 5, 2022; 3:00 p.m.		at St. Francis Brooklyn	W 66–62 ^{OT}	8–14 (4–7)	Daniel J. Lynch Gym (357); Brooklyn, NY
February 10, 2022; 7:00 p.m.		Bryant	L 86–99	8–15 (4–8)	William H. Pitt Center (663); Fairfield, CT
February 12, 2022; 1:00 p.m.		at Fairleigh Dickinson	L 75–82	8–16 (4–9)	Rothman Center (375); Hackensack, NJ
February 15, 2022; 7:00 p.m.		Merrimack; Rescheduled from January 29	L 63–70	8–17 (4–10)	William H. Pitt Center (383); Fairfield, CT
February 17, 2022; 7:00 p.m.		Wagner	L 67–76	8–18 (4–11)	William H. Pitt Center (583); Fairfield, CT
February 19, 2022; 3:00 p.m.		at Merrimack	L 79–80	8–19 (4–12)	Hammel Court (1,406); North Andover, MA
February 24, 2022; 7:00 p.m.		Mount St. Mary's	W 77–65	9–19 (5–12)	William H. Pitt Center (403); Fairfield, CT
February 26, 2022; 2:00 p.m.		Saint Francis (PA)	W 80–68	10–19 (6–12)	William H. Pitt Center (1,013); Fairfield, CT
NEC tournament
March 2, 2022; 7:00 p.m., NEC Front Row	(6)	at (3) LIU; Quarterfinals	L 75–82	10–20	Steinberg Wellness Center (732); Brooklyn, NY
*Non-conference game. ^{#}Rankings from AP poll. (#) Tournament seedings in parentheses. All times are in Eastern.
