= 2021–22 Central Connecticut Blue Devils men's basketball team =

American college basketball season

2021–22 Central Connecticut Blue Devils men's basketball
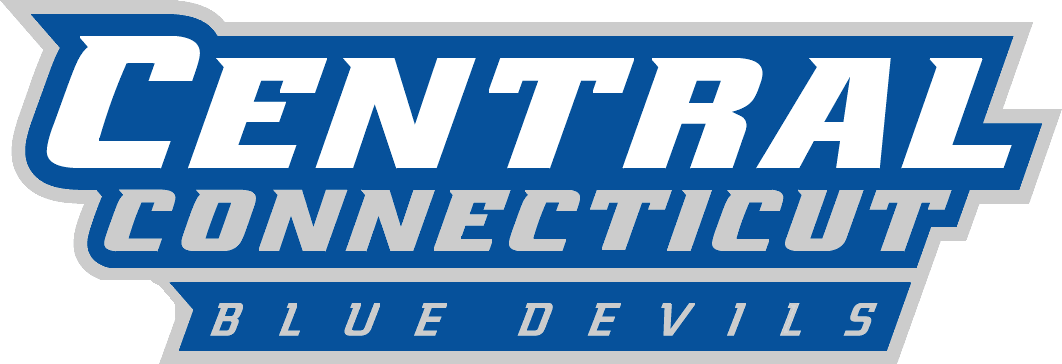
- Conference: Northeast Conference
- Record: 8–24 (5–13 NEC)
- Head coach: Patrick Sellers (1st season)
- Assistant coaches: Lamar Chapman; Ben Wood
- Home arena: William H. Detrick Gymnasium

2021–22 Northeast Conference men's basketball standings
	Conf.				Overall
Team	W		L	PCT	W		L	PCT
Bryant †	16	–	2	.889	22	–	10	.688
Wagner	15	–	3	.833	21	–	6	.778
LIU	12	–	6	.667	16	–	14	.533
Merrimack*	10	–	8	.556	14	–	16	.467
Mount St. Mary's	9	–	9	.500	14	–	16	.467
St. Francis Brooklyn	7	–	11	.389	10	–	20	.333
Sacred Heart	6	–	12	.333	10	–	20	.333
Saint Francis (PA)	5	–	13	.278	9	–	21	.300
Central Connecticut	5	–	13	.278	8	–	24	.250
Fairleigh Dickinson	5	–	13	.278	4	–	22	.154
† 2022 NEC tournament winner * ineligible for the 2022 NCAA tournament due to transition period

The 2021–22 Central Connecticut Blue Devils men's basketball team represented Central Connecticut State University during the 2021–22 NCAA Division I men's basketball season. The Blue Devils were led by first-year head coach Patrick Sellers, and played their home games at the William H. Detrick Gymnasium in New Britain, Connecticut as members of the Northeast Conference.

== Previous season ==
In a season limited due to the ongoing COVID-19 pandemic, the Blue Devils finished the 2020–21 season, 5–16, 5–13 in NEC play to finish in last place. They failed to qualify for the NEC tournament.

== Roster ==
2021–22 Central Connecticut Blue Devils men's basketball team
Players
Coaches

Pos.	#	Name	Height	Weight	Year	Hometown
G	0	Joe Ostrowsky	6 ft 0 in (1.83 m)	175 lb (79 kg)	Fr	Mount Pleasant, Michigan
G	1	Nigel Scantlebury	6 ft 0 in (1.83 m)	170 lb (77 kg)	Jr	Rochester, New York
G	2	Davonte Sweatman	5 ft 8 in (1.73 m)	145 lb (66 kg)	Fr	Boston, Massachusetts
G	3	Ian Krishnan	6 ft 2 in (1.88 m)	180 lb (82 kg)	Jr	Boyds, Maryland
G	5	Hegel Augustin	6 ft 3 in (1.91 m)	205 lb (93 kg)	Sr	Queens, New York
G	10	Zach Newkirk	6 ft 1 in (1.85 m)	185 lb (84 kg)	Jr	Raleigh, North Carolina
G	11	Tre Mitchell	6 ft 3 in (1.91 m)	190 lb (86 kg)	Jr	Phoenix, Arizona
C	12	Arian Dehnavi	6 ft 10 in (2.08 m)	215 lb (98 kg)	So	Montreal, Quebec
F	13	Abdul Momah	6 ft 7 in (2.01 m)	235 lb (107 kg)	Fr	Carteret, New Jersey
G	14	Kyle Rocker	6 ft 2 in (1.88 m)	180 lb (82 kg)	Fr	Lawrence, Massachusetts
F/C	15	Jayden Brown	6 ft 8 in (2.03 m)	215 lb (98 kg)	Fr	Providence, Rhode Island
F	20	Stephane Ayangma	6 ft 6 in (1.98 m)	215 lb (98 kg)	Sr	Yaoundé, Cameroon
G/F	21	Andre Snoddy	6 ft 6 in (1.98 m)	210 lb (95 kg)	Fr	Melville, New York
G/F	22	Trenton McLaughlin	6 ft 6 in (1.98 m)	190 lb (86 kg)	Fr	Chandler, Arizona
F	23	Justice Ellison	6 ft 5 in (1.96 m)	190 lb (86 kg)	Fr	Windsor, Connecticut
C	24	Ola Olamuyiwa	6 ft 10 in (2.08 m)	230 lb (104 kg)	So	Lagos, Nigeria

Head coach

- Patrick Sellers (Central Connecticut)

Assistant coach(es)

- Lamar Chapman (Lane)
- Ben Wood (Connecticut)

Legend

- (C) Team captain
- (S) Suspended
- (I) Ineligible
- (W) Walk-on
- Injured
- Current redshirt

Roster
Last update: November 10, 2021

== Schedule and results ==
NEC COVID-19 policy provided that if a team could not play a conference game due to COVID-19 issues within its program, the game would be declared a forfeit and the other team would receive a conference win. However, wins related to COVID-19 do not count pursuant to NCAA policy.

Date time, TV	Rank^{#}	Opponent^{#}	Result	Record	Site (attendance) city, state
Regular season
November 9, 2021*; 6:30 pm, FS1		at No. 24 UConn	L 48–99	0–1	Gampel Pavilion (10,167); Storrs, CT
November 14, 2021*; 4:00 pm, ESPN+		vs. Brown	L 57–75	0–2	Pizzitola Sports Center (315); Providence, RI
November 16, 2021*; 8:00 pm, FloSports		vs. NC State	L 65–79	0–3	Mohegan Sun Arena (1,000); Uncasville, CT
November 17, 2021*; 5:00 pm, FloSports		UMass Lowell	L 53–77	0–4	Mohegan Sun Arena (1,000); Uncasville, CT
November 20, 2021*; 1:00 pm, ESPN3		at Quinnipiac	L 65–76	0–5	People's United Center (623); Hamden, CT
November 23, 2021*; 7:00 pm, ESPN3		at Maine	W 64–56	1–5	Cross Insurance Center (672); Bangor, ME
November 28, 2021*; 1:00 pm		Fordham	L 83–89 ^{2OT}	1–6	William H. Detrick Gymnasium (1,128); New Britain, CT
December 1, 2021*; 7:00 pm		Holy Cross	W 73–67	2–6	William H. Detrick Gymnasium (1,653); New Britain, CT
December 4, 2021*; 4:00 pm		at New Hampshire	L 45–67	2–7	Lundholm Gym (575); Durham, NH
December 11, 2021*; 2:00 pm, FS1		at Providence	L 53–68	2–8	Dunkin' Donuts Center (5,111); Providence, RI
December 14, 2021*; 6:30 pm, ESPN3		at Stony Brook	L 67–87	2–9	Island Federal Credit Union Arena (1,531); Stony Brook, NY
December 18, 2021*; 1:00 pm		Hartford	W 75–65	3–9	William H. Detrick Gymnasium (1,218); New Britain, CT
December 23, 2021*; 8:30 pm, ESPNU		at Rutgers	Postponed to January 1, 2022 due to COVID-19 issues		Jersey Mike's Arena; Piscataway, NJ
December 29, 2021; 7:00 pm		Bryant	L 76–80	3–10 (0–1)	William H. Detrick Gymnasium (1,658); New Britain, CT
December 31, 2021; 4:00 pm		at St. Francis Brooklyn	W 67–55	4–10 (1–1)	Generoso Pope Athletic Complex (220); Brooklyn, NY
January 1, 2022*; 4:00 pm, BTN		at Rutgers	L 48–79	4–11	Jersey Mike's Arena (7,780); Piscataway, NJ
January 6, 2022; 7:00 pm		Sacred Heart	W 1–0 (Forfeit)	4–11 (2–1)	William H. Detrick Gymnasium; New Britain, CT
January 8, 2022; 1:00 pm		Merrimack	L 57–66	4–12 (2–2)	William H. Detrick Gymnasium (0); New Britain, CT
January 15, 2022; 2:00 pm		at LIU	L 61–83	4–13 (2–3)	Steinberg Wellness Center (145); Brooklyn, NY
January 17, 2022; 7:00 pm		at Sacred Heart	L 66–74	4–14 (2–4)	William H. Pitt Center (563); Fairfield, CT
January 21, 2021; 7:00 pm, ESPN+		at Saint Francis (PA)	L 67—68	4–15 (2–5)	DeGol Arena (855); Loretto, PA
January 23, 2022; 7:00 pm		at Mount St. Mary's	L 50–65	4–16 (2–6)	Knott Arena (1,493); Emmitsburg, MD
January 27, 2022; 7:00 pm		LIU	W 65–62	5–16 (3–6)	William H. Detrick Gymnasium (519); New Britain, CT
January 30, 2022; 1:00 pm		at Fairleigh Dickinson	L 55–75	5–17 (3–7)	Rothman Center (519); Hackensack, NJ
February 3, 2022; 7:00 pm		Wagner	L 52–54	5–18 (3–8)	William H. Detrick Gymnasium (1,003); New Britain, CT
February 5, 2022; 1:00 pm		Fairleigh Dickinson	W 91–82 ^{OT}	6–18 (4–8)	William H. Detrick Gymnasium (1,021); New Britain, CT
February 10, 2021; 4:00 pm		at Merrimack	W 60–57	7–18 (5–8)	Hammel Court (734); North Andover, MA
February 12, 2022; 1:00 pm		St. Francis Brooklyn	L 50–67	7–19 (5–9)	William H. Detrick Gymnasium (825); New Britain, CT
February 17, 2021; 7:00 pm		at Bryant	L 61–75	7–20 (5–10)	Chace Athletic Center (1,575); Smithfield, RI
February 19, 2021; 1:00 pm		at Wagner	L 68–78	7–21 (5–11)	Spiro Sports Center (1,207); Staten Island, NY
February 24, 2022; 7:00 pm		Saint Francis (PA)	L 63–79	7–22 (5–12)	William H. Detrick Gymnasium (976); New Britain, CT
February 26, 2022; 1:00 pm		Mount St. Mary's	L 46–65	7–23 (5–13)	William H. Detrick Gymnasium (1,331); New Britain, CT
NEC tournament
February 28, 2022; 7:00 pm, NEC Front Row	(9)	at (8) Fairleigh Dickinson; Opening round	W 67–66	8–23	Rothman Center (289); Hackensack, NJ
March 2, 2022; 7:00 pm, NEC Front Row	(9)	at (1) Bryant; Quarterfinals	L 59–73	8–24	Chace Athletic Center; Smithfield, RI
*Non-conference game. ^{#}Rankings from AP Poll. (#) Tournament seedings in parentheses. All times are in Eastern.
