= 2021–22 Mount St. Mary's Mountaineers men's basketball team =

American college basketball season

2021–22 Mount St. Mary's Mountaineers men's basketball
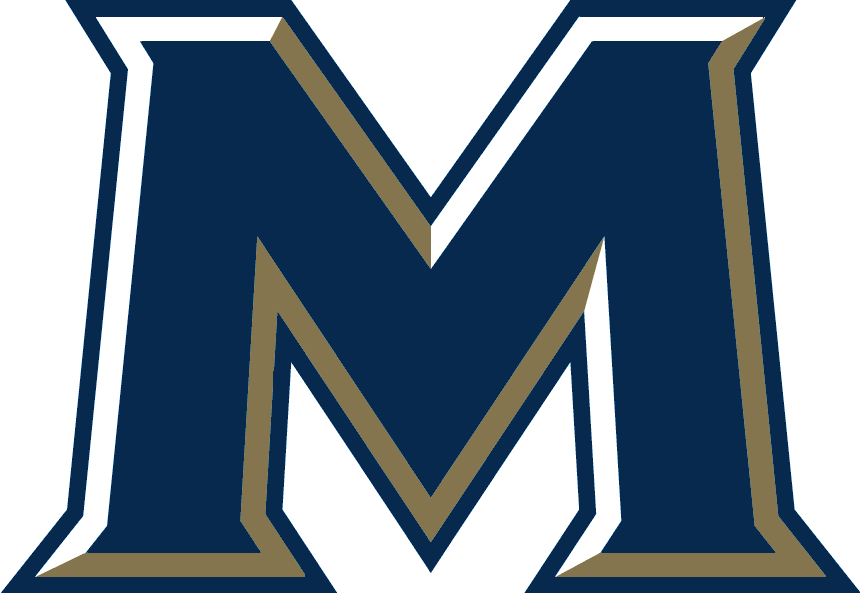
- Conference: Northeast Conference
- Record: 14–16 (9–9 NEC)
- Head coach: Dan Engelstad (4th season)
- Associate head coach: Will Holland
- Assistant coaches: Matt Miller; Justin Burrell
- Home arena: Knott Arena

2021–22 Northeast Conference men's basketball standings
	Conf.				Overall
Team	W		L	PCT	W		L	PCT
Bryant †	16	–	2	.889	22	–	10	.688
Wagner	15	–	3	.833	21	–	6	.778
LIU	12	–	6	.667	16	–	14	.533
Merrimack*	10	–	8	.556	14	–	16	.467
Mount St. Mary's	9	–	9	.500	14	–	16	.467
St. Francis Brooklyn	7	–	11	.389	10	–	20	.333
Sacred Heart	6	–	12	.333	10	–	20	.333
Saint Francis (PA)	5	–	13	.278	9	–	21	.300
Central Connecticut	5	–	13	.278	8	–	24	.250
Fairleigh Dickinson	5	–	13	.278	4	–	22	.154
† 2022 NEC tournament winner * ineligible for the 2022 NCAA tournament due to transition period

The 2021–22 Mount St. Mary's Mountaineers men's basketball team represented Mount St. Mary's University in the 2021–22 NCAA Division I men's basketball season. The Mountaineers, led by fourth-year head coach Dan Engelstad, played their home games at Knott Arena in Emmitsburg, Maryland as members of the Northeast Conference (NEC).

The Mountaineers finished the season 14–16, 9–9 in NEC play, to finish in fifth place. In the NEC tournament, they defeated St. Francis Brooklyn in the quarterfinals before falling to top-seeded and eventual champion Bryant in the semifinals. This was the Mountaineers' last season as members of the Northeast Conference, as they moved to the Metro Atlantic Athletic Conference (MAAC) starting in the 2022–23 season.

On May 2, 2022, it was announced that the Mountaineers will join the MAAC on July 1, 2022, leaving the NEC where they had been members since 1989.

== Previous season ==
In a season limited due to the ongoing COVID-19 pandemic, the Mountaineers finished the 2020–21 season 12–11, 9–7 in NEC play, to finish in fourth place. In the NEC tournament, they defeated Wagner in the semifinals and Bryant in the championship game. As a result, they received the conference's automatic bid to the NCAA tournament as a No. 16 seed in the East region. There they lost in the First Four to Texas Southern.

== Roster ==
2021–22 Mount St. Mary's Mountaineers men's basketball team
Players
Coaches

Pos.	#	Name	Height	Weight	Year	Previous school	Hometown
G	1	Dakota Leffew	6 ft 5 in (1.96 m)	185 lb (84 kg)	So	Jonesboro	Hampton, GA
G	2	Deandre Thomas	6 ft 5 in (1.96 m)	195 lb (88 kg)	Sr	Samford	Inglewood, CA
G	3	Jaylin Gibson	6 ft 3 in (1.91 m)	190 lb (86 kg)	Fr	Legacy of Sport Sciences	Evanston, IL
F	4	Dola Adebayo	6 ft 8 in (2.03 m)	190 lb (86 kg)	Fr	Canterbury School (FL)	Ocala, FL
G	5	Jalen Benjamin	5 ft 10 in (1.78 m)	160 lb (73 kg)	Jr	Meadowcreek	Raleigh, NC
G	10	Dante Bouchard	6 ft 0 in (1.83 m)	175 lb (79 kg)	Fr	IMG Academy	Gloversville, NY
G	11	Elijah Elliott	6 ft 0 in (1.83 m)	165 lb (75 kg)	So	Jack Yates	Houston, TX
F	12	Jedy Cordilia	6 ft 9 in (2.06 m)	210 lb (95 kg)	Fr	West Nottingham Academy	Tilburg, Netherlands
F	13	Mezie Offurum	6 ft 8 in (2.03 m)	230 lb (104 kg)	Sr	George Washington	Germantown, MD
G	15	Bankeys Omari	6 ft 2 in (1.88 m)	165 lb (75 kg)	Fr	Clarksburg	Germantown, MD
F	22	Nana Opoku	6 ft 9 in (2.06 m)	215 lb (98 kg)	RS Sr	Potomac	Woodbridge, VA
G	23	Josh Reaves	6 ft 4 in (1.93 m)	205 lb (93 kg)	So	South Kent School	Hamden, CT
F	24	František Barton	6 ft 7 in (2.01 m)	210 lb (95 kg)	So	Get Better Academy	Brno, Czech Republic
F	34	Jalen Jefferson	6 ft 7 in (2.01 m)	200 lb (91 kg)	Sr	Hopewell	Hopewell, VA
G	35	Winston Moore	6 ft 5 in (1.96 m)	210 lb (95 kg)	So	St. John's Prep	Frederick, MD
F	42	Malik Jefferson	6 ft 9 in (2.06 m)	230 lb (104 kg)	Sr	Hopewell	Hopewell, VA

Head coach

- Dan Engelstad (St. Mary's (MD))

Assistant coach(es)

- Will Holland (Mount St. Mary's)
- Matt Miller (St. Mary's (MD))
- Justin Burrell (Holy Cross)

Legend

- (C) Team captain
- (S) Suspended
- (I) Ineligible
- (W) Walk-on
- Injured
- Current redshirt

Roster
Last update: December 1, 2021

== Schedule and results ==
NEC COVID-19 policy provided that if a team could not play a conference game due to COVID-19 issues within its program, the game would be declared a forfeit and the other team would receive a conference win. However, wins related to COVID-19 do not count pursuant to NCAA policy.

Date time, TV	Rank^{#}	Opponent^{#}	Result	Record	Site (attendance) city, state
Non-conference regular season
November 9, 2021*; 4:30 p.m., FS1		at No. 4 Villanova	L 51–91	0–1	Finneran Pavilion (6,501); Villanova, PA
November 11, 2021*; 7:00 p.m., WDVM		Washington (MD)	W 117–62	1–1	Knott Arena (2,278); Emmitsburg, MD
November 13, 2021*; 1:00 p.m., ESPN+		at Saint Joseph's	L 60–80	1–2	Hagan Arena (1,513); Philadelphia, PA
November 16, 2021*; 7:00 p.m., SECN		at No. 13 Kentucky; Kentucky Classic	L 55–80	1–3	Rupp Arena (18,227); Lexington, KY
November 19, 2021*; 7:00 p.m., ESPN+		at Robert Morris; Kentucky Classic	W 74–70 ^{OT}	2–3	UPMC Events Center (1,589); Moon Township, PA
November 22, 2021*; 7:00 p.m., ESPN+		at Ohio; Kentucky Classic	L 59–73	2–4	Convocation Center (5,178); Athens, OH
November 27, 2021*; 2:00 p.m., WDVM		Navy	L 40–67	2–5	Knott Arena (1,362); Emmitsburg, MD
November 30, 2021*; 7:00 p.m.		Howard	W 72–70	3–5	Knott Arena (1,617); Emmitsburg, MD
December 4, 2021*; 1:00 p.m., ESPN+		at Loyola (MD)	L 55–61	3–6	Reitz Arena (1,121); Baltimore, MD
December 7, 2021*; 9:00 p.m.		at Santa Clara	L 77–88	3–7	Leavey Center (962); Santa Clara, CA
December 11, 2021*; 4:00 p.m., WDVM		American	L 66–72 ^{OT}	3–8	Knott Arena (1,935); Emmitsburg, MD
December 18, 2021*; 4:00 p.m., WDVM		Morgan State	W 74–60	4–8	Knott Arena (1,116); Emmitsburg, MD
December 22, 2021*; 7:00 p.m., WDVM		UMBC	Canceled due to COVID-19 issues		Knott Arena; Emmitsburg, MD
NEC regular season
December 29, 2021; 7:00 p.m., NEC Front Row		Fairleigh Dickinson	L 0–1 (Forfeit)	4–8 (0–1)	Knott Arena; Emmitsburg, MD
December 31, 2021; 2:00 p.m., NEC Front Row		Wagner	L 0–1 (Forfeit)	4–8 (0–2)	Knott Arena; Emmitsburg, MD
January 6, 2022; 7:00 p.m.		at LIU	L 57–74	4–9 (0–3)	Steinberg Wellness Center (84); Brooklyn, NY
January 8, 2022; 4:00 p.m.		at St. Francis Brooklyn	W 69–61	5–9 (1–3)	Daniel J. Lynch Gym (187); Brooklyn, NY
January 15, 2022; 1:00 p.m.		at Bryant	L 66–73	5–10 (1–4)	Chace Athletic Center (240); Smithfield, RI
January 17, 2022; 7:00 p.m.		at Merrimack	W 57–50	6–10 (2–4)	Hammel Court (242); North Andover, MA
January 21, 2022; 7:00 p.m., NEC Front Row		Sacred Heart	W 98–59	7–10 (3–4)	Knott Arena; Emmitsburg, MD
January 23, 2022; 2:00 p.m., NEC Front Row		Central Connecticut	W 65–50	8–10 (4–4)	Knott Arena (1,493); Emmitsburg, MD
January 27, 2022; 7:00 p.m.		at Fairleigh Dickinson	W 67–56	9–10 (5–4)	Rothman Center (137); Hackensack, NJ
January 29, 2022; 5:00 p.m., NEC Front Row		Saint Francis (PA)	W 71–54	10–10 (6–4)	Knott Arena (2,154); Emmitsburg, MD
February 3, 2022; 7:00 p.m., NEC Front Row		Merrimack	W 69–53	11–10 (7–4)	Knott Arena (1,739); Emmitsburg, MD
February 5, 2022; 4:00 p.m., NEC Front Row		Bryant	L 61–62	11–11 (7–5)	Knott Arena (2,784); Emmitsburg, MD
February 10, 2022; 7:00 p.m., ESPNU		at Wagner	L 57–69	11–12 (7–6)	Spiro Sports Center (1,944); Staten Island, NY
February 12, 2022; 4:00 p.m.		at Saint Francis (PA)	W 54–52	12–12 (8–6)	DeGol Arena (799); Loretto, PA
February 17, 2022; 7:00 p.m., NEC Front Row		St. Francis Brooklyn	L 55–64	12–13 (8–7)	Knott Arena (1,792); Emmitsburg, MD
February 19, 2022; 4:00 p.m., NEC Front Row		LIU	L 61–66	12–14 (8–8)	Knott Arena (2,625); Emmitsburg, MD
February 24, 2022; 7:00 p.m.		at Sacred Heart	L 65–77	12–15 (8–9)	William H. Pitt Center (403); Fairfield, CT
February 26, 2022; 1:00 p.m.		at Central Connecticut	W 65–46	13–15 (9–9)	William H. Detrick Gymnasium (1,331); New Britain, CT
NEC tournament
March 2, 2022; 7:00 p.m., NEC Front Row	(4)	(5) St. Francis Brooklyn; Quarterfinals	W 78–48	14–15	Knott Arena (2,274); Emmitsburg, MD
March 5, 2022; 6:00 p.m., ESPN3	(4)	at (1) Bryant; Semifinals	L 69–70	14–16	Chace Athletic Center (2,650); Smithfield, RI
*Non-conference game. ^{#}Rankings from AP poll. (#) Tournament seedings in parentheses. All times are in Eastern.
