= 2021–22 LIU Sharks men's basketball team =

American college basketball season

2021–22 LIU Sharks men's basketball
- Conference: Northeast Conference
- Record: 16–14 (12–6 NEC)
- Head coach: Derek Kellogg (5th season)
- Assistant coaches: Jim Mack (7th season); Ralph Auriantal (5th season); Matthew Vogel (1st season)
- Home arena: Steinberg Wellness Center

2021–22 Northeast Conference men's basketball standings
	Conf.				Overall
Team	W		L	PCT	W		L	PCT
Bryant †	16	–	2	.889	22	–	10	.688
Wagner	15	–	3	.833	21	–	6	.778
LIU	12	–	6	.667	16	–	14	.533
Merrimack*	10	–	8	.556	14	–	16	.467
Mount St. Mary's	9	–	9	.500	14	–	16	.467
St. Francis Brooklyn	7	–	11	.389	10	–	20	.333
Sacred Heart	6	–	12	.333	10	–	20	.333
Saint Francis (PA)	5	–	13	.278	9	–	21	.300
Central Connecticut	5	–	13	.278	8	–	24	.250
Fairleigh Dickinson	5	–	13	.278	4	–	22	.154
† 2022 NEC tournament winner * ineligible for the 2022 NCAA tournament due to transition period

The 2021–22 LIU Sharks men's basketball team represented Long Island University in the 2021–22 NCAA Division I men's basketball season. The Sharks, led by fifth-year head coach Derek Kellogg, played their home games at the Steinberg Wellness Center in Brooklyn, New York as members of the Northeast Conference (NEC).

== Previous season ==
The Sharks finished the 2020–21 season 9–9, 9–9 in NEC play to finish in a three-way tie for fifth place. Due to complications caused by the COVID-19 pandemic, only the top four teams were eligible to participate in the NEC tournament.

== Roster ==
2021–22 LIU Sharks men's basketball team
Players
Coaches

Pos.	#	Name	Height	Weight	Year	Hometown
G	0	Weston Baer	6 ft 2 in (1.88 m)	—	Fr	Pomeroy, OH
G/F	1	Noble Crawford	6 ft 5 in (1.96 m)	—	So	Orlando, FL
G	2	Tre Wood	6 ft 1 in (1.85 m)	—	RS Jr	Upper Marlboro, MD
F	3	Anthony Kabala	6 ft 8 in (2.03 m)	—	So	Paris, France
G/F	4	Kyndall Davis	6 ft 5 in (1.96 m)	—	So	Chicago, IL
G	5	Andre Washington	5 ft 11 in (1.8 m)	—	Fr	Staten Island, NY
G	10	Tyree Pickron	6 ft 3 in (1.91 m)	—	Jr	Philadelphia, PA
F	11	Eral Penn	6 ft 7 in (2.01 m)	—	RS Sr	Brooklyn, NY
G	13	Zaid Wague	6 ft 2 in (1.88 m)	—	So	Brooklyn, NY
G	15	Devin Nicholson	6 ft 2 in (1.88 m)	—	Sr	Staten Island, NY
F/C	20	Jake Cook	6 ft 9 in (2.06 m)	—	So	Watervliet, NY
G	23	Alex Rivera	6 ft 1 in (1.85 m)	—	RS Jr	Lowell, MA
F	24	Ty Flowers	6 ft 9 in (2.06 m)	—	GS	Waterbury, CT
F	32	Isaac Kante	6 ft 8 in (2.03 m)	—	GS	Brooklyn, NY
F	33	James Kamich	6 ft 9 in (2.06 m)	—	So	Tonj, South Sudan
G	44	Quion Burns	6 ft 5 in (1.96 m)	—	Fr	White Plains, NY

Head coach

- Derek Kellogg (UMass)

Assistant coach(es)

- Jim Mack (Springfield)
- Ralph Auriantal (St. Francis Brooklyn)
- Matthew Vogel (UMass)

Legend

- (C) Team captain
- (S) Suspended
- (I) Ineligible
- (W) Walk-on
- Injured
- Current redshirt

Roster
Last update: November 27, 2021

== Schedule and results ==
Date time, TV	Rank^{#}	Opponent^{#}	Result	Record	Site (attendance) city, state
Non-conference regular season
November 9, 2021*; 10:30 pm		at San Francisco	L 64–98	0–1	War Memorial Gymnasium (1,439); San Francisco, CA
November 12, 2021*; 10:00 pm		at Fresno State	L 60–84	0–2	Save Mart Center (3,438); Fresno, CA
November 17, 2021*; 6:30 pm, FS2		at No. 23 UConn	L 40–93	0–3	Harry A. Gampel Pavilion (8,481); Storrs, CT
November 23, 2021*; 7:00 pm, ESPN3		at Saint Peter's	L 62–64	0–4	Yanitelli Center (434); Jersey City, NJ
November 27, 2021*; 2:00 pm		Delaware State	W 99–67	1–4	Steinberg Wellness Center (375); Brooklyn, NY
November 30, 2021*; 7:00 pm		at Delaware	L 67–75	1–5	Bob Carpenter Center (1,451); Newark, DE
December 2, 2021*; 7:00 pm		at Towson	L 63–72	1–6	SECU Arena (1,357); Towson, MD
December 9, 2021*; 7:00 pm, ESPN+		at Fordham	L 57–73	1–7	Rose Hill Gymnasium (690); Bronx, NY
December 13, 2021*; 7:00 pm		Merchant Marine	W 106–48	2–7	Steinberg Wellness Center (127); Brooklyn, NY
December 19, 2021*; 2:00 pm		Army	W 90–65	3–7	Steinberg Wellness Center; Brooklyn, NY
December 21, 2021*; 6:00 pm		UMass Lowell	Canceled		Steinberg Wellness Center; Brooklyn, NY
NEC regular season
December 29, 2021; 7:00 pm		at Sacred Heart	L 65–69	3–8 (0–1)	William H. Pitt Center (504); Fairfield, CT
December 31, 2021; 2:00 pm		at Merrimack	L 77–82	3–9 (0–2)	Hammel Court (170); North Andover, MA
January 6, 2022; 7:00 pm		Mount St. Mary's	W 74–57	4–9 (1–2)	Steinberg Wellness Center (84); Brooklyn, NY
January 8, 2022; 2:00 pm		Saint Francis (PA)	W 75–70 ^{OT}	5–9 (2–2)	Steinberg Wellness Center (113); Brooklyn, NY
January 15, 2022; 2:00 pm		Central Connecticut	W 83–61	6–9 (3–2)	Steinberg Wellness Center (145); Brooklyn, NY
January 17, 2022; 3:00 pm		at St. Francis Brooklyn; Battle of Brooklyn	W 80–65	7–9 (4–2)	Daniel J. Lynch Gym (325); Brooklyn, NY
January 21, 2022; 7:00 pm		Wagner	L 85–92 ^{OT}	7–10 (4–3)	Steinberg Wellness Center (232); Brooklyn, NY
January 23, 2022; 7:00 pm		at Fairleigh Dickinson	W 79–75	8–10 (5–3)	Rothman Center (107); Hackensack, NJ
January 27, 2022; 7:00 pm		at Central Connecticut	L 72–75	8–11 (5–4)	William H. Detrick Gymnasium (519); New Britain, CT
January 30, 2022; 1:00 pm		at Bryant	L 81–88	8–12 (5–5)	Chace Athletic Center (750); Smithfield, RI
February 3, 2022; 7:00 pm		Sacred Heart	W 79–75	9–12 (6–5)	Steinberg Wellness Center (164); Brooklyn, NY
February 5, 2022; 1:00 pm		at Wagner	L 64–79	9–13 (6–6)	Spiro Sports Center (1,617); Staten Island, NY
February 10, 2022; 7:00 pm, ESPN3		St. Francis Brooklyn; Battle of Brooklyn	W 74–69	10–13 (7–6)	Steinberg Wellness Center (226); Brooklyn, NY
February 12, 2022; 2:00 pm		Bryant	W 99–88	11–13 (8–6)	Steinberg Wellness Center (593); Brooklyn, NY
February 17, 2022; 7:00 pm		at Saint Francis (PA)	W 81–63	12–13 (9–6)	DeGol Arena (640); Loretto, PA
February 19, 2022; 4:00 pm		at Mount St. Mary's	W 66–61	13–13 (10–6)	Knott Arena (2,625); Emmitsburg, MD
February 24, 2022; 7:00 pm		Merrimack	W 85–74	14–13 (11–6)	Steinberg Wellness Center (375); Brooklyn, NY
February 26, 2022; 2:00 pm		Fairleigh Dickinson	W 84–77	15–13 (12–6)	Steinberg Wellness Center (524); Brooklyn, NY
NEC tournament
March 2, 2022; 7:00 pm, NEC Front Row	(3)	(6) Sacred Heart; Quarterfinals	W 82–75	16–13	Steinberg Wellness Center (732); Brooklyn, NY
March 5, 2022; 8:00 pm, ESPN3/SNY	(3)	at (2) Wagner; Semifinals	L 62–82	16–14	Spiro Sports Center (2,004); Staten Island, NY
*Non-conference game. ^{#}Rankings from AP Poll. (#) Tournament seedings in parentheses. All times are in Eastern.
