= 2022 Northeast Conference men's basketball tournament =

American college basketball postseason tournament

- Classification: Division I
- Season: 2021–22
- Teams: 9
- Site: Campus sites
- Champions: Bryant (1st title)
- Winning coach: Jared Grasso (1st title)
- MVP: Peter Kiss (Bryant)
- Television: NEC Front Row, ESPN3, ESPN2

2021–22 Northeast Conference men's basketball standings
	Conf.				Overall
Team	W		L	PCT	W		L	PCT
Bryant †	16	–	2	.889	22	–	10	.688
Wagner	15	–	3	.833	21	–	6	.778
LIU	12	–	6	.667	16	–	14	.533
Merrimack*	10	–	8	.556	14	–	16	.467
Mount St. Mary's	9	–	9	.500	14	–	16	.467
St. Francis Brooklyn	7	–	11	.389	10	–	20	.333
Sacred Heart	6	–	12	.333	10	–	20	.333
Saint Francis (PA)	5	–	13	.278	9	–	21	.300
Central Connecticut	5	–	13	.278	8	–	24	.250
Fairleigh Dickinson	5	–	13	.278	4	–	22	.154
* ineligible for the 2022 NCAA tournament due to transition period
† 2022 NEC tournament winner

The 2022 Northeast Conference men's basketball tournament was the postseason men's basketball tournament for the Northeast Conference (NEC) for the 2021–22 NCAA Division I men's basketball season. The tournament took place on four dates between February 28 and March 8, 2022, with each game hosted by the higher-seeded school. The tournament winner, the Bryant Bulldogs, received the conference's automatic bid to the NCAA tournament, the first for the Bulldogs. This was also Bryant's final season in the NEC, as the school joined the America East Conference that July.

== Seeds ==
All nine of the eligible teams in the conference qualified for the tournament. Teams were seeded by record within the conference, with a tiebreaker system to seed teams with identical conference records.

The tiebreakers used by the NEC are 1) head-to-head records of teams with identical records, 2) comparison of records against individual teams in the conference starting with the top-ranked team(s) and working down and 3) NCAA NET Rankings available on day following the conclusion of Northeast Conference regular-season play. The round-robin record tiebreaker was used to place Saint Francis (PA), Fairleigh Dickinson, and Central Connecticut in that order for the last three seeds.

- Note: Merrimack College joined the Northeast Conference from the Division II Northeast-10 Conference in 2019. At the time, the NEC did not allow transitional members to play in the conference tournament, making the Warriors ineligible until 2024. After the 2021–22 season, the NEC presidents voted to allow transitional members to compete in the conference tournament starting with their third transitional seasons, making Merrimack eligible for the tournament starting with the 2023 edition.

Seed	School	Conf.	NET ranking (February 27, 2021)
1	Bryant	16–2	218th
2	Wagner	15–3	132nd
3	LIU	12–6	243rd
4	Mount St. Mary's	9–9	267th
5	St. Francis Brooklyn	7–11	314th
6	Sacred Heart	6–12	325th
7	Saint Francis (PA)	5–13	329th
8	Fairleigh Dickinson	5–13	348th
9	Central Connecticut	5–13	345th

== Schedule ==
Session	Game	Time*	Matchup	Score	Television
Opening Round – Monday, February 28
1	1	7:00 pm	No. 9 Central Connecticut at No. 8 Fairleigh Dickinson	67–66	NEC Front Row
Quarterfinals – Wednesday March 2
2	2	7:00 pm	No. 9 Central Connecticut at No. 1 Bryant	59–73	NEC Front Row
2	3	7:00 pm	No. 5 St. Francis Brooklyn at No. 4 Mount St. Mary's	48–78	NEC Front Row
3	4	7:00 pm	No. 7 Saint Francis (PA) at No. 2 Wagner	53–82	NEC Front Row
3	5	7:00 pm	No. 6 Sacred Heart at No. 3 LIU	75–82	NEC Front Row
Semifinals – Saturday, March 5
4	6	6:00 pm	No. 4 Mount St. Mary's at No. 1 Bryant	69–70	ESPN3
4	7	8:00 pm	No. 3 LIU at No. 2 Wagner	62–82	ESPN3
Championship – Tuesday, March 8
5	8	7:00 pm	No. 2 Wagner at No. 1 Bryant	43–70	ESPN2
*Game times in ET. Rankings denote tournament seed

== Bracket ==
Opening Round; Monday, February 28; NEC Front Row
8	Fairleigh Dickinson	66
9	Central Connecticut	67

Quarterfinals; Wednesday March 2 NEC Front Row
1	Bryant	73
9	Central Connecticut	59
4	Mount St. Mary's	78
5	St. Francis Brooklyn	48
2	Wagner	82
7	Saint Francis (PA)	53
3	Long Island	82
6	Sacred Heart	75

Semifinals; Saturday, March 5 ESPN3
1	Bryant	70
4	Mount St. Mary's	69
2	Wagner	82
3	Long Island	62

Championship; Tuesday, March 8 ESPN2
1	Bryant	70
2	Wagner	43

* denotes overtime period.

== Awards and honors ==
Tournament MVP: Peter Kiss

First Team
- Alex Morales, Wagner
- Tyrn FLowers, Long Island
- Peter Kiss, Bryant
- Charles Pride, Bryant
- Hall Elisias, Bryant

== Championship game brawl ==
During the Championship game between Bryant and Wagner, a fight between fans of both teams broke out with 4:37 left in the second half. The altercation lasted almost half an hour resulting in many fans being escorted out in addition to Wagner guard Will Martinez being ejected from the game. The game was later resumed resulting in a 70–43 Bryant victory. Before the Bryant fans would be able to storm the court, Wagner had to exit the floor to prevent any more conflict. After the game, 20-year-old Bryant student Connor Gleim was arrested by the Rhode Island State Police. Gleim was charged with disorderly conduct and obstructing an officer in execution of duty.

== See also ==
- 2022 Northeast Conference women's basketball tournament
