= Patrick Sellers =

American basketball coach (born 1968)

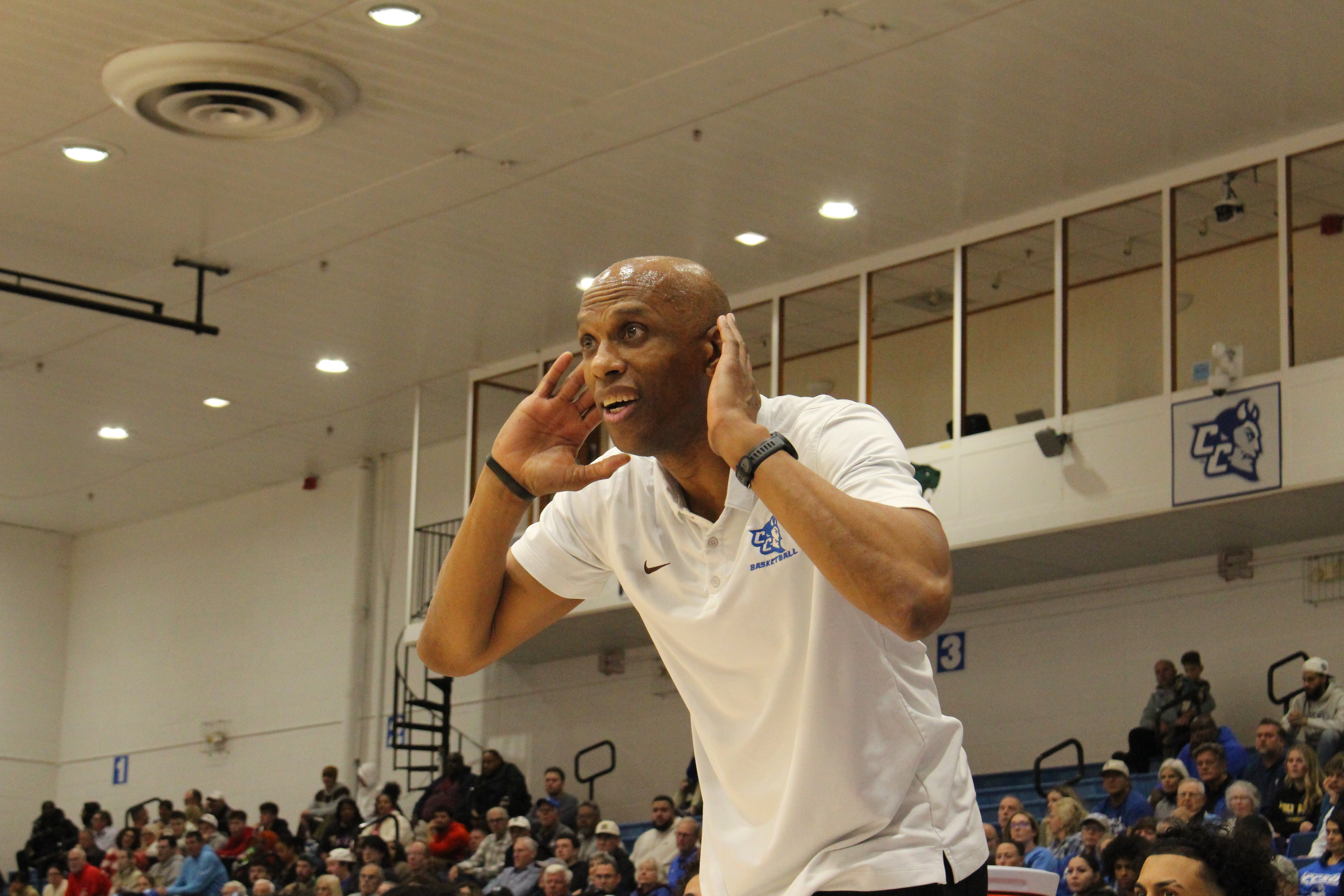
- Sellers as head coach for Central Connecticut in 2025

Central Connecticut Blue Devils
- Title: Head coach
- League: Northeast Conference

Personal information
- Born: December 28, 1968 (age 57) Florence, South Carolina, U.S.
- Listed height: 6 ft 6 in (1.98 m)

Career information
- High school: Wilson (Florence, South Carolina)
- College: Central Connecticut (1987–1991)
- NBA draft: 1991: undrafted
- Playing career: 1991–1993
- Position: Shooting guard
- Coaching career: 1994–present

Career history

Playing
- 1991–1993: Middlesbrough Mohawks

Coaching
- 1994–1997: St. Thomas Aquinas HS (assistant)
- 1997–1999: St. Thomas Aquinas HS
- 1999–2003: Central Connecticut (assistant)
- 2003–2004: UMass (assistant)
- 2004–2007: Connecticut (DBO)
- 2007–2010: Connecticut (associate HC)
- 2010–2011: Shanxi Zhongyu (assistant)
- 2011–2013: Hofstra (assistant)
- 2013–2015: Creighton (assistant)
- 2015–2017: DePaul (assistant)
- 2017–2019: Fairleigh Dickinson (assistant)
- 2019–2021: Fairfield (assistant)
- 2021–present: Central Connecticut

Career highlights
- As player: ECC Defensive Player of the Year (1991); As coach: 2× NEC regular season champion (2024, 2025); 2× NEC Coach of the Year (2024, 2025)

Patrick Sellers (born December 28, 1968) is an American basketball coach and former player who is currently the head coach at Central Connecticut State University.

== Head coaching record ==
Record table
Season	Team	Overall	Conference	Standing	Postseason
Central Connecticut Blue Devils (Northeast Conference) (2021–present)
2021–22	Central Connecticut	8–24	5–13	T–8th	
2022–23	Central Connecticut	10–22	7–9	T–7th	
2023–24	Central Connecticut	20–11	13–3	T–1st	
2024–25	Central Connecticut	25–7	14–2	1st	
2025–26	Central Connecticut	18–12	12–6	2nd	
2026–27	Central Connecticut	3–2	0–0		
Central Connecticut:		84–78 (.519)	51–33 (.607)		
Total:		82–78 (.513)			
National champion Postseason invitational champion Conference regular season champion Conference regular season and conference tournament champion Division regular season champion Division regular season and conference tournament champion Conference tournament champion
