= Chace Athletic Center =

Multi-purpose arena in Rhode Island, US

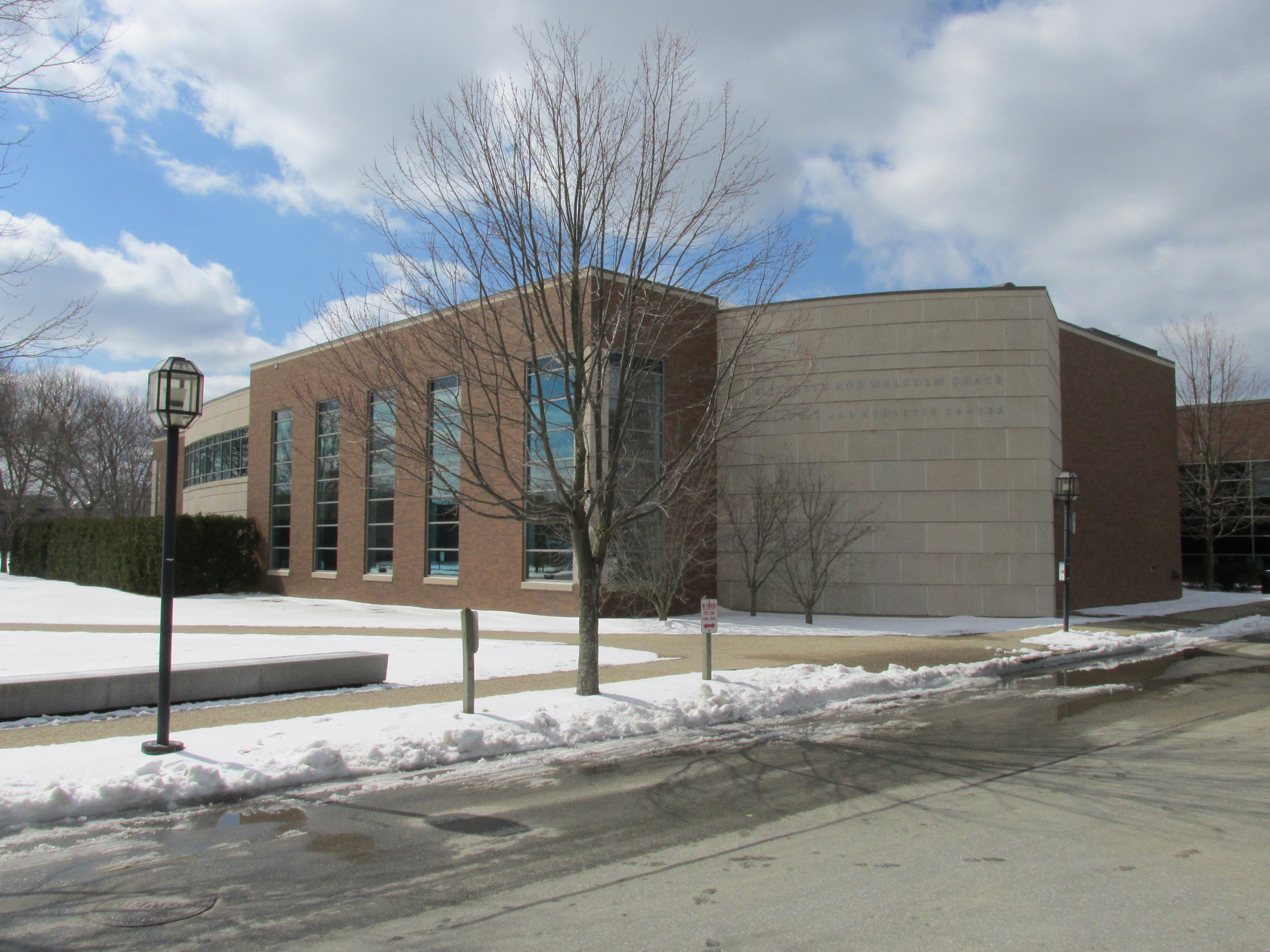
- Interactive map of Chace Athletic Center
- Full name: Elizabeth and Malcolm Chace Wellness and Athletic Center
- Location: Smithfield, Rhode Island
- Coordinates: 41°55′15.63″N 71°32′22.7″W
- Owner: Bryant University
- Operator: Bryant University
- Capacity: 2,650
- Surface: Hardwood

Construction
- Opened: November 2001
- Architects: Thurlow Small Architecture, Inc.

Tenant
- Bryant Bulldogs

Elizabeth and Malcolm Chace Wellness and Athletic Center is a multi-purpose arena in Smithfield, Rhode Island. It is home to the Bryant University Bulldogs men's and women's basketball teams as well as the women's volleyball team.

The venue received additions in the 2000s and 2010s under Bryant President Ronald Machtley and athletic director Bill Smith. Its current capacity is 2,000 with upgrades that include over 650 chairback seats opposite the team benches in 2018.

The 2018 upgrades also included new basketball locker rooms, a press conference room, and improved locker rooms for Bryant's swimming & diving programs, whose pool is connected to the original structure with the Chace gym.

The Chace became infamous following a brawl between fans of Wagner College and Bryant in the 2022 Northeast Conference men's basketball tournament championship game. The fight resulted in a 30 minute suspension of play during the game.

== See also ==
- List of NCAA Division I basketball arenas
