= 2019–20 Wagner Seahawks men's basketball team =

American college basketball season

2019–20 Wagner Seahawks men's basketball
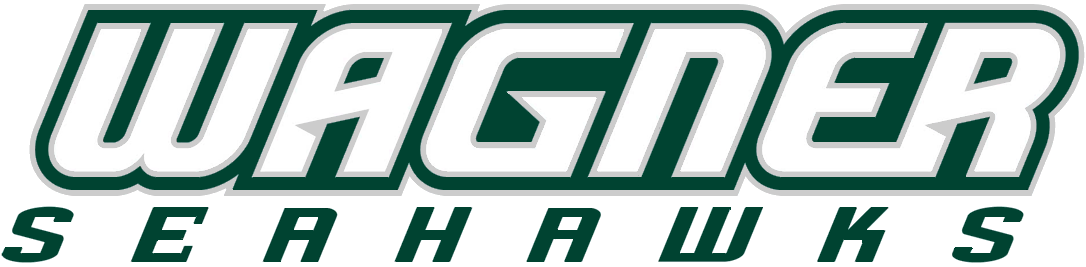
- Conference: Northeast Conference
- Record: 8–21 (5–13 NEC)
- Head coach: Bashir Mason (8th season)
- Assistant coaches: Mike Babul; Donald Copeland; Winston Smith
- Home arena: Spiro Sports Center

2019–20 Northeast Conference men's basketball standings
	Conf.				Overall
Team	W		L	PCT	W		L	PCT
Merrimack*	14	–	4	.778	20	–	11	.645
Robert Morris †	13	–	5	.722	20	–	14	.588
Saint Francis (PA)	13	–	5	.722	22	–	10	.688
Sacred Heart	12	–	6	.667	20	–	13	.606
LIU	9	–	9	.500	15	–	18	.455
Fairleigh Dickinson	9	–	9	.500	11	–	19	.367
Mount St. Mary's	7	–	11	.389	11	–	21	.344
Bryant	7	–	11	.389	15	–	17	.469
St. Francis Brooklyn	7	–	11	.389	13	–	18	.419
Wagner	5	–	13	.278	8	–	21	.276
Central Connecticut	3	–	15	.167	4	–	27	.129
† 2020 NEC tournament winner * Ineligible for NEC championship (reclassification from Division II)

The 2019–20 Wagner Seahawks men's basketball team represented Wagner College during the 2019–20 NCAA Division I men's basketball season. The Seahawks were led by eight-year head coach Bashir Mason. They played their home games at Spiro Sports Center on the school's Staten Island campus as members of the Northeast Conference. They finished the season 8–21, 5–13 in NEC play to finish in tenth place. They failed to qualify for the NEC tournament.

== Previous season ==
The Seahawks finished the 2018–19 season 13–17 overall, 8–10 in NEC play to finish in seventh place. As the No. 7 seed in the NEC tournament, they were defeated in the quarterfinals by the eventual tournament champion, Fairleigh Dickinson.

== Roster ==
2019–20 Wagner Seahawks men's basketball team
Players
Coaches

Pos.	#	Name	Height	Weight	Year	Previous school	Hometown
F	0	Nigel Jackson	6 ft 7 in (2.01 m)	215 lb (98 kg)	Jr	Mount Saint Joseph	Baltimore, MD
G	1	Atiba Taylor	6 ft 4 in (1.93 m)	180 lb (82 kg)	So	Hackensack	Garfield, NJ
G	2	Alex Morales	6 ft 6 in (1.98 m)	180 lb (82 kg)	Jr	Mainland Regional	Paterson, NJ
G	3	Jordan Mason	6 ft 4 in (1.93 m)	190 lb (86 kg)	Fr	Dexter Southfield	Hanson, MA
G	4	Elijah Ford	6 ft 5 in (1.96 m)	190 lb (86 kg)	Jr	Weequahic	Newark, NJ
G	11	Will Martinez	6 ft 5 in (1.96 m)	190 lb (86 kg)	Jr	Wings Academy	Bronx, NY
G	12	Chase Freeman	5 ft 11 in (1.8 m)	165 lb (75 kg)	Jr	Station Camp	Gallatin, TN
G	13	Tyrone Nesby IV	6 ft 5 in (1.96 m)	180 lb (82 kg)	So	Scotland Campus Prep	Reading, PA
F	22	Ja'Mier Fletcher	6 ft 4 in (1.93 m)	215 lb (98 kg)	Fr	Steel Valley	Pittsburgh, PA
F	23	Darion Jordan-Thomas	6 ft 3 in (1.91 m)	190 lb (86 kg)	Fr	Woodstock Academy	Brockton, MA
C	25	Deandre Wilkins	6 ft 11 in (2.11 m)	190 lb (86 kg)	Fr	Great Bridge Academy	Edenton, NC
G	33	Curtis Cobb III	6 ft 3 in (1.91 m)	190 lb (86 kg)	GS	UMass	Fall River, MA

Head coach

- Bashir Mason (Drexel)

Assistant coach(es)

- Mike Babul (Massachusetts)
- Donald Copeland (Seton Hall)
- Winston Smith (Massachusetts)

Legend

- (C) Team captain
- (S) Suspended
- (I) Ineligible
- (W) Walk-on
- Injured
- Current redshirt

Roster
Last update: September 5, 2019

== Schedule and results ==
Date time, TV	Opponent	Result	Record	Site (attendance) city, state
Non-conference regular season
November 5, 2019*; 7:00 pm	at No. 12 Seton Hall	L 71–105	0–1	Walsh Gymnasium (1,655); South Orange, NJ
November 9, 2019*; 4:00 pm	at Penn State	L 64–91	0–2	Bryce Jordan Center (6,372); University Park, PA
November 12, 2019*; 7:00 pm	Wesley	W 97–67	1–2	Spiro Sports Center (1,231); Staten Island, NY
November 16, 2019*; 2:00 pm, ESPN+	at NJIT	L 69–88	1–3	Wellness and Events Center (1,255); Newark, NJ
November 20, 2019*; 7:00 pm	at Saint Peter's	W 81–77 ^{OT}	2–3	Yanitelli Center (520); Jersey City, NJ
November 23, 2019*; 3:00 pm	Stony Brook	L 84–87 ^{OT}	2–4	Spiro Sports Center (1,266); Staten Island, NY
November 30, 2018*; 12:00 pm, FS2	at St. John's	L 63–86	2–5	Carnesecca Arena (3,253); Queens, NY
December 14, 2019*; 2:00 pm, ESPN3	at Hartford	L 63–71	2–6	Chase Arena at Reich Family Pavilion (698); Hartford, CT
December 18, 2019*; 7:00 pm, ESPN+	at La Salle	L 60–74	2–7	Tom Gola Arena (1,074); Philadelphia, PA
December 21, 2019*; 2:00 pm	Army	W 82–62	3–7	Spiro Sports Center (1,119); Staten Island, NY
December 28, 2019*; 4:00 pm	Fairfield	L 54–66	3–8	Spiro Sports Center (1,203); Staten Island, NY
NEC regular season
January 2, 2020; 7:00 pm	at Mount St. Mary's	W 66–47	4–8 (1–0)	Knott Arena (1,267); Emmitsburg, MD
January 4, 2020; 7:00 pm, SNY	Sacred Heart	L 74–81	4–9 (1–1)	Spiro Sports Center (1,804); Staten Island, NY
January 9, 2020; 7:00 pm	at Saint Francis (PA)	L 62–80	4–10 (1–2)	DeGol Arena (537); Loretto, PA
January 11, 2020; 1:00 pm	at Robert Morris	L 62–94	4–11 (1–3)	UPMC Events Center (1,097); Moon Township, PA
January 18, 2020; 4:00 pm	St. Francis Brooklyn	L 64–69	4–12 (1–4)	Spiro Sports Center (1,127); Staten Island, NY
January 20, 2020; 4:00 pm	LIU	W 72–64	5–12 (2–4)	Spiro Sports Center (1,373); Staten Island, NY
January 23, 2020; 7:00 pm	at Bryant	L 58–79	5–13 (2–5)	Chace Athletic Center (917); Smithfield, RI
January 25, 2020; 3:30 pm	at Central Connecticut	L 76–86	5–14 (2–6)	William H. Detrick Gymnasium (1,084); New Britain, CT
January 30, 2020; 7:00 pm	Fairleigh Dickinson	L 63–68	5–15 (2–7)	Spiro Sports Center (1,183); Staten Island, NY
February 6, 2020; 7:00 pm	Robert Morris	L 62–67	5–16 (2–8)	Spiro Sports Center (1,253); Staten Island, NY
February 8, 2020; 4:00 pm	Saint Francis (PA)	L 68–85	5–17 (2–9)	Spiro Sports Center (1,531); Staten Island, NY
February 13, 2020; 7:00 pm	at Fairleigh Dickinson	L 73–106	5–18 (2–10)	Rothman Center (537); Hackensack, NJ
February 15, 2020; 4:00 pm, ESPN+	at Merrimack	L 59–68	5–19 (2–11)	Merrimack Athletics Complex (1,500); North Andover, MA
February 18, 2020; 7:00 pm	Mount St. Mary's	W 67–61	6–19 (3–11)	Spiro Sports Center (1,039); Staten Island, NY
February 21, 2020; 7:30 pm	Central Connecticut	W 68–56	7–19 (4–11)	Spiro Sports Center (1,009); Staten Island, NY
February 23, 2020; 4:00 pm	at St. Francis Brooklyn	W 75–71 ^{OT}	8–19 (5–11)	Generoso Pope Athletic Complex (513); Brooklyn, NY
February 27, 2020; 7:00 pm	at LIU	L 66–74	8–20 (5–12)	Steinberg Wellness Center (763); Brooklyn, NY
February 29, 2020; 2:00 pm	Bryant	L 59–80	8–21 (5–13)	Spiro Sports Center (1,614); Staten Island, NY
*Non-conference game. ^{#}Rankings from AP Poll. (#) Tournament seedings in parentheses. All times are in Eastern.
