= 2019–20 Central Connecticut Blue Devils men's basketball team =

American college basketball season

2019–20 Central Connecticut Blue Devils men's basketball
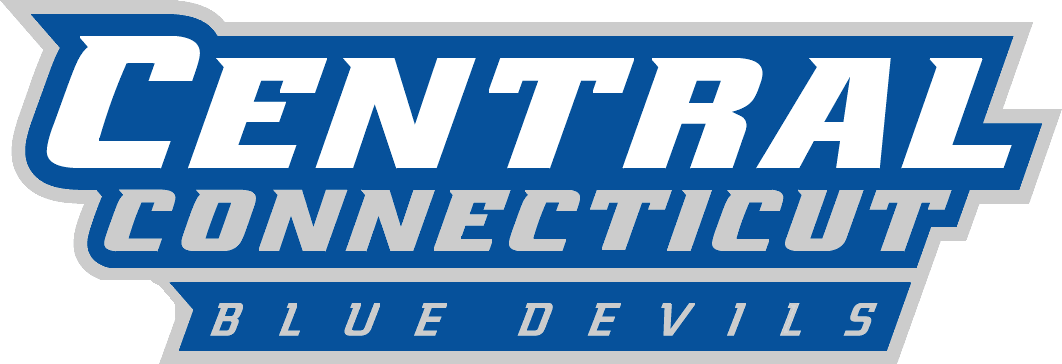
- Conference: Northeast Conference
- Record: 4–27 (3–15 NEC)
- Head coach: Donyell Marshall (4th season)
- Assistant coaches: Mike Witcoskie; Anthony Ross; Baba Diallo
- Home arena: William H. Detrick Gymnasium

2019–20 Northeast Conference men's basketball standings
| | Conf. | | | | Overall |
| Team | W | | L | PCT | W | | L | PCT |
|---|---|---|---|---|---|---|---|---|
| Merrimack* | 14 | – | 4 | .778 | 20 | – | 11 | .645 |
| Robert Morris † | 13 | – | 5 | .722 | 20 | – | 14 | .588 |
| Saint Francis (PA) | 13 | – | 5 | .722 | 22 | – | 10 | .688 |
| Sacred Heart | 12 | – | 6 | .667 | 20 | – | 13 | .606 |
| LIU | 9 | – | 9 | .500 | 15 | – | 18 | .455 |
| Fairleigh Dickinson | 9 | – | 9 | .500 | 11 | – | 19 | .367 |
| Mount St. Mary's | 7 | – | 11 | .389 | 11 | – | 21 | .344 |
| Bryant | 7 | – | 11 | .389 | 15 | – | 17 | .469 |
| St. Francis Brooklyn | 7 | – | 11 | .389 | 13 | – | 18 | .419 |
| Wagner | 5 | – | 13 | .278 | 8 | – | 21 | .276 |
| Central Connecticut | 3 | – | 15 | .167 | 4 | – | 27 | .129 |
† 2020 NEC tournament winner * Ineligible for NEC championship (reclassification from Division II)

The 2019–20 Central Connecticut Blue Devils men's basketball team represented Central Connecticut State University during the 2019–20 NCAA Division I men's basketball season. The Blue Devils were led by fourth-year head coach Donyell Marshall, and played their home games at the William H. Detrick Gymnasium in New Britain, Connecticut as members of the Northeast Conference. They finished the season 4–27, 3–15 in NEC play to finish in last place. They failed to qualify for the NEC tournament.

== Previous season ==
The Blue Devils finished the 2018–19 season, 11–20 overall, 5–13 in NEC play to finish in last place. They failed to qualify for the NEC tournament.

== Roster ==
2019–20 Central Connecticut Blue Devils men's basketball team
Players
Coaches

| Pos. | # | Name | Height | Weight | Year | Hometown |
|---|---|---|---|---|---|---|
| G/F | 0 | Greg Outlaw | 6 ft 4 in (1.93 m) | 175 lb (79 kg) | Fr | Chicago, Illinois |
| G | 1 | Trey Tennyson | 6 ft 4 in (1.93 m) | 170 lb (77 kg) | Fr | Mansfield, Texas |
| G | 2 | Myles Baker | 6 ft 2 in (1.88 m) | 170 lb (77 kg) | Fr | Chicago, Illinois |
| G | 3 | Ian Krishnan | 6 ft 2 in (1.88 m) | 180 lb (82 kg) | So | Boyds, Maryland |
| F | 5 | Xavier Wilson | 6 ft 7 in (2.01 m) | 210 lb (95 kg) | Fr | Spring Valley, New York |
| G | 10 | Zach Newkirk | 6 ft 1 in (1.85 m) | 185 lb (84 kg) | So | Raleigh, North Carolina |
| G | 11 | Thai Segwai | 6 ft 2 in (1.88 m) | 185 lb (84 kg) | So | London, England |
| G | 13 | Jamir Reed | 6 ft 4 in (1.93 m) | 200 lb (91 kg) | Fr | Philadelphia, Pennsylvania |
| G/F | 15 | Jamir Coleman | 6 ft 7 in (2.01 m) | 215 lb (98 kg) | Sr | San Antonio, Texas |
| F | 20 | Stephane Ayangma | 6 ft 6 in (1.98 m) | 215 lb (98 kg) | Jr | Yaoundé, Cameroon |
| F | 23 | Karrington Wallace | 6 ft 7 in (2.01 m) | 200 lb (91 kg) | So | Philadelphia, Pennsylvania |
| C | 24 | Ola Olamuyiwa | 6 ft 9 in (2.06 m) | 220 lb (100 kg) | Fr | Lagos, Nigeria |
| F | 30 | Donyell Marshall, Jr. | 6 ft 6 in (1.98 m) | 175 lb (79 kg) | Sr | Pepper Pike, Ohio |
| G | 40 | Tyler Rowe | 5 ft 9 in (1.75 m) | 160 lb (73 kg) | Sr | East Hartford, Connecticut |

Head coach

- Donyell Marshall (Connecticut)

Assistant coach(es)

- Mike Witcoskie (Susquehanna)
- Anthony Ross (East Stroudsburg)
- Baba Diallo (Baker)

Legend

- (C) Team captain
- (S) Suspended
- (I) Ineligible
- (W) Walk-on
- Injured
- Current redshirt

Roster
Last update: August 29, 2019

== Schedule and results ==
| Date time, TV | Opponent | Result | Record | Site (attendance) city, state |
Exhibition
| October 28, 2019* | Coast Guard | W 104–64 | | William H. Detrick Gymnasium; New Britain, CT |
Non-conference regular season
| November 5, 2019*; 7:00 pm | Hartford; Rivalry | L 59–74 | 0–1 | William H. Detrick Gymnasium (2,115); New Britain, CT |
| November 9, 2019*; 4:00 pm | at St. John's | L 57–87 | 0–2 | Carnesecca Arena (3,582); Queens, NY |
| November 14, 2019*; 10:00 pm | at Arizona State; Air Force Reserve Tip Off | L 49–90 | 0–3 | Desert Financial Arena (7,496); Tempe, AZ |
| November 16, 2019*; 1:00 pm | at UMass; Air Force Reserve Tip Off | L 43–89 | 0–4 | Mullins Center (2,873); Amherst, MA |
| November 19, 2019*; 7:00 pm | New Hampshire | L 63–77 | 0–5 | William H. Detrick Gymnasium (1,274); New Britain, CT |
| November 23, 2019*; 7:30 pm, ESPN3 | vs. Vermont; Air Force Reserve Tip Off semifinals | L 49–81 | 0–6 | Mohegan Sun Arena; Uncasville, CT |
| November 24, 2019*; 6:00 pm, ESPN3 | vs. Columbia; Air Force Reserve Tip Off semifinals | L 52–82 | 0–7 | Mohegan Sun Arena; Uncasville, CT |
| December 1, 2019*; 1:00 pm | at UMass Lowell | L 71–73 | 0–8 | Tsongas Center (779); Lowell, MA |
| December 7, 2019*; 1:00 pm | Maine | L 64–66 | 0–9 | William H. Detrick Gymnasium (1,107); New Britain, CT |
| December 15, 2019*; 1:00 pm | at Boston College | L 55–74 | 0–10 | Conte Forum (3,963); Chestnut Hill, MA |
| December 18, 2019*; 11:00 am | at Dartmouth | L 60–76 | 0–11 | Leede Arena (1,007); Hanover, NH |
| December 20, 2019*; 6:00 pm | at No. 23 Penn State | L 58–87 | 0–12 | Bryce Jordan Center (6,404); University Park, PA |
| December 29, 2019*; 1:00 pm | Connecticut College | W 89–55 | 1–12 | William H. Detrick Gymnasium (821); New Britain, CT |
NEC regular season
| January 2, 2020; 7:30 pm | Robert Morris | L 78–89 | 1–13 (0–1) | William H. Detrick Gymnasium (1,096); New Britain, CT |
| January 4, 2020; 3:30 pm | Saint Francis (PA) | L 69–93 | 1–14 (0–2) | William H. Detrick Gymnasium (1,026); New Britain, CT |
| January 9, 2020; 7:00 pm | at LIU | L 78–90 | 1–15 (0–3) | Steinberg Wellness Center (382); Brooklyn, NY |
| January 11, 2020; 3:30 pm | Merrimack | L 46–58 | 1–16 (0–4) | William H. Detrick Gymnasium (1,126); New Britain, CT |
| January 15, 2020; 6:00 pm | at Sacred Heart | L 55–66 | 1–17 (0–5) | William H. Pitt Center (651); Fairfield, CT |
| January 18, 2020; 4:00 pm | at Mount St. Mary's | L 52–79 | 1–18 (0–6) | Knott Arena (1,426); Emmitsburg, MD |
| January 20, 2020; 3:30 pm | at Fairleigh Dickinson | L 60–83 | 1–19 (0–7) | Rothman Center (667); Hackensack, NJ |
| January 23, 2020; 7:00 pm | Sacred Heart | L 54–82 | 1–20 (0–8) | William H. Detrick Gymnasium (1,021); New Britain, CT |
| January 25, 2020; 3:30 pm | Wagner | W 86–76 | 2–20 (1–8) | William H. Detrick Gymnasium (1,084); New Britain, CT |
| January 30, 2020; 7:00 pm | at Saint Francis (PA) | L 77–84 | 2–21 (1–9) | DeGol Arena (1,008); Loretto, PA |
| February 1, 2020; 1:00 pm | at Robert Morris | L 57–64 | 2–22 (1–10) | UPMC Events Center (2,353); Moon Township, PA |
| February 8, 2020; 4:00 pm, ESPN+ | at Bryant | L 60–64 | 2–23 (1–11) | Chace Athletic Center (1,662); Smithfield, RI |
| February 13, 2020; 7:00 pm | LIU | L 74–90 | 2–24 (1–12) | William H. Detrick Gymnasium (1,032); New Britain, CT |
| February 15, 2020; 3:30 pm | Bryant | W 75–70 | 3–24 (2–12) | William H. Detrick Gymnasium (1,289); New Britain, CT |
| February 18, 2020; 7:00 pm, ESPN3 | Fairleigh Dickinson | W 76–75 | 4–24 (3–12) | William H. Detrick Gymnasium (1,192); New Britain, CT |
| February 21, 2020; 7:30 pm | at Wagner | L 56–68 | 4–25 (3–13) | Spiro Sports Center (1,009); Staten Island, NY |
| February 27, 2020; 7:00 pm | at Merrimack | L 58–69 | 4–26 (3–14) | Merrimack Athletics Complex (1,404); North Andover, MA |
| February 29, 2020; 1:00 pm | St. Francis Brooklyn | L 79–85 | 4–27 (3–15) | William H. Detrick Gymnasium (1,372); New Britain, CT |
*Non-conference game. ^{#}Rankings from AP Poll. (#) Tournament seedings in parentheses. All times are in Eastern.
