= 2019–20 Fairleigh Dickinson Knights men's basketball team =

American college basketball season

2019–20 Fairleigh Dickinson Knights men's basketball
- Conference: Northeast Conference
- Record: 11–19 (9–9 NEC)
- Head coach: Greg Herenda (7th season)
- Assistant coaches: Bruce Hamburger; Patrick Sellers; Pete Lappas
- Home arena: Rothman Center

2019–20 Northeast Conference men's basketball standings
	Conf.				Overall
Team	W		L	PCT	W		L	PCT
Merrimack*	14	–	4	.778	20	–	11	.645
Robert Morris †	13	–	5	.722	20	–	14	.588
Saint Francis (PA)	13	–	5	.722	22	–	10	.688
Sacred Heart	12	–	6	.667	20	–	13	.606
LIU	9	–	9	.500	15	–	18	.455
Fairleigh Dickinson	9	–	9	.500	11	–	19	.367
Mount St. Mary's	7	–	11	.389	11	–	21	.344
Bryant	7	–	11	.389	15	–	17	.469
St. Francis Brooklyn	7	–	11	.389	13	–	18	.419
Wagner	5	–	13	.278	8	–	21	.276
Central Connecticut	3	–	15	.167	4	–	27	.129
† 2020 NEC tournament winner * Ineligible for NEC championship (reclassification from Division II)

The 2019–20 Fairleigh Dickinson Knights men's basketball team represented Fairleigh Dickinson University during the 2019–20 NCAA Division I men's basketball season. The team was led by seventh-year head coach Greg Herenda. The Knights played their home games at the Rothman Center in Hackensack, New Jersey as members of the Northeast Conference (NEC). They finished the season 11–19, 9–9 in NEC play, to finish in a tie for fifth place. They lost in the quarterfinals of the NEC tournament to LIU.

== Previous season ==
The Knights finished the 2018–19 season 21–14, 12–6 in NEC play, to finish in a tie for first place. They defeated Wagner, Robert Morris and Saint Francis (PA) to capture the NEC tournament championship as the 2-seed. By winning the NEC tournament, the Knights received the conference's automatic bid and defeated Prairie View A&M in the First Four round of the NCAA tournament in Dayton, Ohio. The Knights then lost to 1-seed Gonzaga.

== Roster ==
2019–20 Fairleigh Dickinson Knights men's basketball team
Players
Coaches

Pos.	#	Name	Height	Weight	Year	Hometown
G	0	Devon Dunn	6 ft 1 in (1.85 m)	175 lb (79 kg)	Fr	Washington, D.C.
G	1	Bassel Jr. Saliba	6 ft 4 in (1.93 m)	190 lb (86 kg)	So	Hackensack, NJ
G	2	Brandon Rush	6 ft 3 in (1.91 m)	175 lb (79 kg)	Fr	Warrensville Heights, OH
G	3	Jahlil Jenkins	6 ft 0 in (1.83 m)	160 lb (73 kg)	Jr	Ranson, WV
G	4	Brandon Powell	6 ft 2 in (1.88 m)	185 lb (84 kg)	So	Middletown, NY
G	5	Xzavier Malone-Key	6 ft 4 in (1.93 m)	186 lb (84 kg)	RS Jr	Philadelphia, PA
G	11	Callum Baker	6 ft 0 in (1.83 m)	160 lb (73 kg)	Fr	Oakville, ON
F	12	Kaleb Bishop	6 ft 8 in (2.03 m)	195 lb (88 kg)	Sr	Paterson, NJ
C	15	Oscar Okeke	6 ft 11 in (2.11 m)	225 lb (102 kg)	Jr	Abuja, Nigeria
F	21	Elyjah Williams	6 ft 7 in (2.01 m)	220 lb (100 kg)	Jr	Evanston, IL
F	24	Marc Dadika	6 ft 8 in (2.03 m)	210 lb (95 kg)	RS Fr	Saddle Brook, NJ
F	25	Daniel Rodriguez	6 ft 6 in (1.98 m)	250 lb (113 kg)	Fr	Newark, NJ
C	44	Collin McManus	6 ft 10 in (2.08 m)	240 lb (109 kg)	Fr	Bedford, NH

Head coach

- Greg Herenda (Merrimack)

Assistant coach(es)

- Bruce Hamburger (Central Connecticut State)
- Patrick Sellers (Central Connecticut State)
- Pete Lappas (Boston College)

Legend

- (C) Team captain
- (S) Suspended
- (I) Ineligible
- (W) Walk-on
- Injured
- Current redshirt

Roster
Last update: March 22, 2024

== Schedule and results ==
Date time, TV	Rank^{#}	Opponent^{#}	Result	Record	Site (attendance) city, state
Exhibition
October 31, 2019*; 10:00 a.m.		Georgian Court	W 88–69		Rothman Center (201); Hackensack, NJ
Non-conference regular season
November 5, 2019*; 7:00 p.m.		FDU–Florham	W 101–52	1–0	Rothman Center (518); Hackensack, NJ
November 8, 2019*; 8:00 p.m.		at DePaul	L 59–70	1–1	Wintrust Arena (3,945); Chicago, IL
November 13, 2019*; 7:00 p.m.		at Fordham	L 50–53	1–2	Rose Hill Gymnasium (1,463); The Bronx, NY
November 18, 2019*; 7:00 p.m.		at Army	L 65–81	1–3	Christl Arena (484); West Point, NY
November 24, 2019*; 1:00 p.m.		at Lafayette	L 75–80	1–4	Kirby Sports Center (1,000); Easton, PA
November 26, 2019*; 7:00 p.m.		at Notre Dame	L 66–91	1–5	Edmund P. Joyce Center (6,166); South Bend, IN
December 3, 2019*; 7:00 p.m.		Quinnipiac	W 78–77	2–5	Rothman Center (652); Hackensack, NJ
December 7, 2019*; 4:00 p.m.		at No. 8 Kentucky	L 52–83	2–6	Rupp Arena (20,080); Lexington, KY
December 11, 2019*; 7:00 p.m.		at Saint Peter's	L 70–86	2–7	Yanitelli Center (586); Jersey City, NJ
December 14, 2019*; 1:00 p.m.		Princeton	L 65–80	2–8	Rothman Center (611); Hackensack, NJ
December 22, 2019*; 12:00 p.m.		at La Salle	L 58–66	2–9	Tom Gola Arena (1,411); Philadelphia, PA
NEC regular season
January 2, 2020; 7:30 p.m.		at St. Francis Brooklyn	L 63–79	2–10 (0–1)	Generoso Pope Athletic Complex (464); Brooklyn, NY
January 4, 2020; 1:00 p.m.		at Bryant	W 77–73	3–10 (1–1)	Chace Athletic Center (860); Smithfield, RI
January 9, 2020; 7:00 p.m.		Sacred Heart	L 75–77	3–11 (1–2)	Rothman Center (711); Hackensack, NJ
January 11, 2020; 4:30 p.m.		at LIU	L 70–84	3–12 (1–3)	Steinberg Wellness Center (538); Brooklyn, NY
January 15, 2020; 5:00 p.m., ESPNU		Saint Francis (PA)	L 85–100	3–13 (1–4)	Rothman Center (486); Hackensack, NJ
January 20, 2020; 3:30 p.m.		Central Connecticut	W 83–60	4–13 (2–4)	Rothman Center (667); Hackensack, NJ
January 23, 2020; 7:00 p.m.		at Merrimack	L 71–74 ^{2OT}	4–14 (2–5)	Merrimack Athletics Complex (955); North Andover, MA
January 25, 2020; 3:30 p.m.		at Sacred Heart	L 60–77	4–15 (2–6)	William H. Pitt Center (686); Fairfield, CT
January 30, 2020; 7:00 p.m.		at Wagner	W 68–63	5–15 (3–6)	Spiro Sports Center (1,183); Staten Island, NY
February 1, 2020; 3:30 p.m.		Mount St. Mary's	W 85–75	6–15 (4–6)	Rothman Center (452); Hackensack, NJ
February 6, 2020; 7:00 p.m., ESPN3		Merrimack	L 53–57	6–16 (4–7)	Rothman Center (1,046); Hackensack, NJ
February 13, 2020; 7:00 p.m.		Wagner	W 106–73	7–16 (5–7)	Rothman Center (537); Hackensack, NJ
February 15, 2020; 1:00 p.m.		at Robert Morris	W 72–71	8–16 (6–7)	UPMC Events Center (1,794); Moon Township, PA
February 18, 2020; 7:00 p.m., ESPN3		at Central Connecticut	L 75–76	8–17 (6–8)	William H. Detrick Gymnasium (1,192); New Britain, CT
February 21, 2020; 8:00 p.m.		LIU	L 81–86	8–18 (6–9)	Rothman Center (712); Hackensack, NJ
February 23, 2020; 3:30 p.m.		Robert Morris	W 75–70	9–18 (7–9)	Rothman Center (1,010); Hackensack, NJ
February 27, 2020; 7:00 p.m.		Bryant	W 74–72	10–18 (8–9)	Rothman Center (627); Hackensack, NJ
February 29, 2020; 4:00 p.m.		at Mount St. Mary's	W 83–77	11–18 (9–9)	Knott Arena (1,860); Emmitsburg, MD
NEC tournament
March 4, 2020; 7:00 p.m., NEC Front Row	(5)	at (4) LIU; Quarterfinals	L 72–73	11–19	Steinberg Wellness Center (1,432); Brooklyn, NY
*Non-conference game. ^{#}Rankings from AP poll. (#) Tournament seedings in parentheses. All times are in Eastern.
