= 2019–20 Sacred Heart Pioneers men's basketball team =

American college basketball season

2019–20 Sacred Heart Pioneers men's basketball
- Conference: Northeast Conference
- Record: 20–13 (12–6 NEC)
- Head coach: Anthony Latina (7th season)
- Assistant coaches: Johnny Kidd; Kevin Papacs; Kyle Steinway
- Home arena: William H. Pitt Center

2019–20 Northeast Conference men's basketball standings
	Conf.				Overall
Team	W		L	PCT	W		L	PCT
Merrimack*	14	–	4	.778	20	–	11	.645
Robert Morris †	13	–	5	.722	20	–	14	.588
Saint Francis (PA)	13	–	5	.722	22	–	10	.688
Sacred Heart	12	–	6	.667	20	–	13	.606
LIU	9	–	9	.500	15	–	18	.455
Fairleigh Dickinson	9	–	9	.500	11	–	19	.367
Mount St. Mary's	7	–	11	.389	11	–	21	.344
Bryant	7	–	11	.389	15	–	17	.469
St. Francis Brooklyn	7	–	11	.389	13	–	18	.419
Wagner	5	–	13	.278	8	–	21	.276
Central Connecticut	3	–	15	.167	4	–	27	.129
† 2020 NEC tournament winner * Ineligible for NEC championship (reclassification from Division II)

The 2019–20 Sacred Heart Pioneers men's basketball team represented Sacred Heart University during the 2019–20 NCAA Division I men's basketball season. This was the Pioneers' 21st season of NCAA Division I basketball, all played in the Northeast Conference. The Pioneers were led by seventh-year head coach Anthony Latina and played their home games at the William H. Pitt Center in Fairfield, Connecticut. They finished the season 20–13, 12–6 in NEC play to finish in fourth place. They defeated Mount St. Mary's in the quarterfinals of the NEC tournament before losing in the semifinals to Saint Francis (PA). With 20 wins, they were a candidate for postseason play. However, all postseason tournaments were cancelled amid the COVID-19 pandemic.

== Previous season ==
The Pioneers finished the 2018–19 season 15–17, 11–7 in NEC play to finish in third place. As the 3-seed they lost to 6-seed LIU Brooklyn in the quarterfinals of the NEC tournament.

== Roster ==
2019–20 Sacred Heart Pioneers men's basketball team
Players
Coaches

Pos.	#	Name	Height	Weight	Year	Hometown
F	25	Jare'l Spellman	6 ft 10 in (2.08 m)	205 lb (93 kg)	RS Sr	Glen Allen, Virginia
G	30	Kinnon LaRose	6 ft 3 in (1.91 m)	185 lb (84 kg)	RS Sr	Ogdensburg, New York
G	12	Zach Radz	6 ft 2 in (1.88 m)	203 lb (92 kg)	Sr	Watervliet, New York
G/F	24	E.J. Anosike	6 ft 8 in (2.03 m)	245 lb (111 kg)	Jr	East Orange, New Jersey
G	4	Alex Watson	6 ft 3 in (1.91 m)	170 lb (77 kg)	Jr	Marietta, Georgia
G	0	Aaron Clarke	6 ft 1 in (1.85 m)	185 lb (84 kg)	So	Parsippany, New Jersey
G	2	Koreem Ozier	6 ft 1 in (1.85 m)	180 lb (82 kg)	So	Racine, Wisconsin
F	3	Myles Cephas	6 ft 7 in (2.01 m)	215 lb (98 kg)	So	Chicago, Illinois
F	5	Zach Pfaffenberger	6 ft 8 in (2.03 m)	215 lb (98 kg)	So	Midlothian, Virginia
G	11	Cameron Parker	6 ft 2 in (1.88 m)	170 lb (77 kg)	So	Beaverton, Oregon
G	13	Chaylyn Martin	6 ft 0 in (1.83 m)	160 lb (73 kg)	So	Hartford, Connecticut
G	22	Tyler Thomas	6 ft 3 in (1.91 m)	195 lb (88 kg)	Fr	Amity, Connecticut
G	32	Abood Abuissa	6 ft 4 in (1.93 m)	210 lb (95 kg)	Fr	Doha, Qatar

Head coach

- Anthony Latina (Brandeis)

Assistant coach(es)

- Johnny Kidd (Central Connecticut State)
- Kevin Papacs (Central Connecticut State)
- Kyle Steinway (Providence)

Legend

- (C) Team captain
- (S) Suspended
- (I) Ineligible
- (W) Walk-on
- Injured
- Current redshirt

Roster
Last update: August 30, 2019

== Schedule and results ==
Date time, TV	Rank^{#}	Opponent^{#}	Result	Record	Site (attendance) city, state
Non-conference regular season
November 5, 2019*; 7:00 pm		at Providence	L 60–106	0–1	Dunkin' Donuts Center (8,103); Providence, RI
November 8, 2019*; 7:00 pm, SNY		at UConn	L 67–89	0–2	Harry A. Gampel Pavilion (10,167); Storrs, CT
November 16, 2019*; 4:00 pm		at Binghamton	L 72–76	0–3	Binghamton University Events Center (2,510); Vestal, NY
November 19, 2019*; 7:00 pm		Brown	W 84–63	1–3	William H. Pitt Center (804); Fairfield, CT
November 22, 2019*; 5:00 pm		vs. Presbyterian; Bobcats Invitational	W 83–57	2–3	TD Bank Sports Center (0); Hamden, CT
November 23, 2019*; 4:00 pm		vs. Albany; Bobcats Invitational	L 65–72	2–4	TD Bank Sports Center; Hamden, CT
November 24, 2019*; 3:30 pm, ESPN+		at Quinnipiac; Bobcats Invitational	W 97–80	3–4	TD Bank Sports Center (883); Hamden, CT
December 1, 2019*; 2:00 pm		Pine Manor	W 101–57	4–4	William H. Pitt Center (114); Fairfield, CT
December 4, 2019*; 7:00 pm, ESPN+		at UMass Lowell	W 89–86	5–4	Tsongas Center (554); Lowell, MA
December 8, 2019*; 2:00 pm		at Hartford	W 79–62	6–4	Chase Arena at Reich Family Pavilion (845); Hartford, CT
December 15, 2019*; 2:00 pm		at UCF	L 65–76	6–5	Addition Financial Arena (3,994); Orlando, FL
December 22, 2019*; 12:00 pm, NESN		at Holy Cross	W 89–68	7–5	Hart Center (1,013); Worcester, MA
December 29, 2019*; 2:00 pm		Lafayette	L 66–67	7–6	William H. Pitt Center (357); Fairfield, CT
NEC Regular season
January 2, 2020; 7:30 pm		Merrimack	L 57–65	7–7 (0–1)	William H. Pitt Center (376); Fairfield, CT
January 4, 2020; 7:00 pm, SNY		at Wagner	W 81–74	8–7 (1–1)	Spiro Sports Center (1,804); Staten Island, NY
January 9, 2020; 7:00 pm		at Fairleigh Dickinson	W 77–75	9–7 (2–1)	Rothman Center (711); Hackensack, NJ
January 15, 2020; 6:00 pm		Central Connecticut	W 66–55	10–7 (3–1)	William H. Pitt Center (651); Fairfield, CT
January 18, 2020; 7:00 pm		at Saint Francis (PA)	L 65–72	10–8 (3–2)	DeGol Arena (1,270); Loretto, PA
January 20, 2020; 5:00 pm, CBSSN		at Robert Morris	L 55–67	10–9 (3–3)	UPMC Events Center (1,572); Moon Township, PA
January 23, 2020; 7:00 pm		at Central Connecticut	W 82–54	11–9 (4–3)	William H. Detrick Gymnasium (1,021); New Britain, CT
January 25, 2020; 3:30 pm		Fairleigh Dickinson	W 77–60	12–9 (5–3)	William H. Pitt Center (686); Fairfield, CT
January 30, 2020; 11:00 am		Mount St. Mary's	W 58–53	13–9 (6–3)	William H. Pitt Center (1,504); Fairfield, CT
February 1, 2020; 4:00 pm		at St. Francis Brooklyn	W 83–76	14–9 (7–3)	Generoso Pope Athletic Complex (428); Brooklyn, NY
February 6, 2020; 7:00 pm		Saint Francis (PA)	L 68–70	14–10 (7–4)	William H. Pitt Center (401); Fairfield, CT
February 8, 2020; 3:00 pm		Robert Morris	L 58–61	14–11 (7–5)	William H. Pitt Center (1,008); Fairfield, CT
February 13, 2020; 5:00 pm, CBSSN		Bryant	W 74–65	15–11 (8–5)	William H. Pitt Center (755); Fairfield, CT
February 15, 2020; 4:30 pm		at LIU	W 80–72	16–11 (9–5)	Steinberg Wellness Center (749); Brooklyn, NY
February 21, 2020; 7:00 pm		at Merrimack	L 57–64	16–12 (9–6)	Merrimack Athletics Complex (1,500); North Andover, MA
February 23, 2020; 1:00 pm		at Bryant	W 83–76	17–12 (10–6)	Chace Athletic Center (914); Smithfield, RI
February 27, 2020; 7:00 pm		St. Francis Brooklyn	W 73–63	18–12 (11–6)	William H. Pitt Center (331); Fairfield, CT
February 29, 2020; 3:30 pm		LIU	W 76–67	19–12 (12–6)	William H. Pitt Center (651); Fairfield, CT
NEC tournament
March 4, 2020; 7:00 pm, NEC Front Row	(3)	(6) Mount St. Mary's; Quarterfinals	W 61–59	20–12	William H. Pitt Center (502); Fairfield, CT
March 7, 2020; 12:00 pm, ESPN3	(3)	at (2) Saint Francis (PA); Semifinals	L 72–84	20–13	DeGol Arena (1,423); Loretto, PA
*Non-conference game. ^{#}Rankings from AP Poll. (#) Tournament seedings in parentheses. All times are in Eastern Time..
