= 2019–20 Mount St. Mary's Mountaineers men's basketball team =

American college basketball season

2019–20 Mount St. Mary's Mountaineers men's basketball
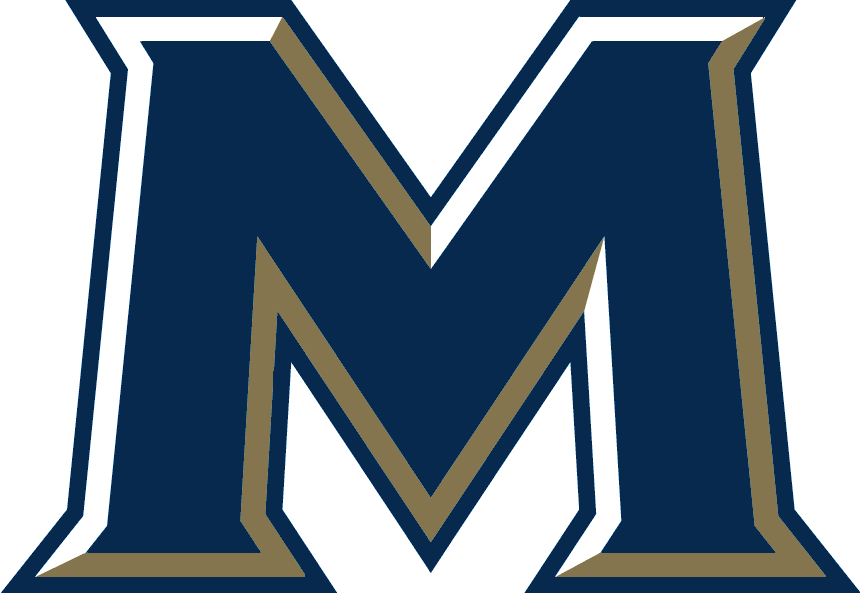
- Conference: Northeast Conference
- Record: 11–21 (7–11 NEC)
- Head coach: Dan Engelstad (2nd season)
- Assistant coaches: Will Holland; Xavier Joyner; Matt Miller
- Home arena: Knott Arena

2019–20 Northeast Conference men's basketball standings
| | Conf. | | | | Overall |
| Team | W | | L | PCT | W | | L | PCT |
|---|---|---|---|---|---|---|---|---|
| Merrimack* | 14 | – | 4 | .778 | 20 | – | 11 | .645 |
| Robert Morris † | 13 | – | 5 | .722 | 20 | – | 14 | .588 |
| Saint Francis (PA) | 13 | – | 5 | .722 | 22 | – | 10 | .688 |
| Sacred Heart | 12 | – | 6 | .667 | 20 | – | 13 | .606 |
| LIU | 9 | – | 9 | .500 | 15 | – | 18 | .455 |
| Fairleigh Dickinson | 9 | – | 9 | .500 | 11 | – | 19 | .367 |
| Mount St. Mary's | 7 | – | 11 | .389 | 11 | – | 21 | .344 |
| Bryant | 7 | – | 11 | .389 | 15 | – | 17 | .469 |
| St. Francis Brooklyn | 7 | – | 11 | .389 | 13 | – | 18 | .419 |
| Wagner | 5 | – | 13 | .278 | 8 | – | 21 | .276 |
| Central Connecticut | 3 | – | 15 | .167 | 4 | – | 27 | .129 |
† 2020 NEC tournament winner * Ineligible for NEC championship (reclassification from Division II)

The 2019–20 Mount St. Mary's Mountaineers men's basketball team represented Mount St. Mary's University during the 2019–20 NCAA Division I men's basketball season. The Mountaineers were led by second-year head coach Dan Engelstad, and played their home games at Knott Arena in Emmitsburg, Maryland as members of the Northeast Conference (NEC). They finished the season 11–21, 7–11 in NEC play, to finish in a three-way tie for seventh place. They lost in the quarterfinals of the NEC tournament to Sacred Heart.

== Previous season ==
The Mountaineers finished the 2018–19 season 9–22 overall, 6–12 in NEC play, to finish in ninth place. They failed to qualify for the NEC tournament.

== Roster ==
2019–20 Mount St. Mary's Mountaineers men's basketball team
Players
Coaches

| Pos. | # | Name | Height | Weight | Year | Previous school | Hometown |
|---|---|---|---|---|---|---|---|
| G | 0 | Vado Morse | 6 ft 0 in (1.83 m) | 155 lb (70 kg) | So | Bullis School | Suitland, MD |
| G | 1 | Dee Barnes | 6 ft 4 in (1.93 m) | 180 lb (82 kg) | So | Great Mills | Great Mills, MD |
| G | 2 | Jalen Gibbs | 6 ft 3 in (1.91 m) | 180 lb (82 kg) | Jr | North Point | Indian Head, MD |
| G | 3 | Matt Becht | 6 ft 2 in (1.88 m) | 175 lb (79 kg) | RS Fr | Bishop O'Connell | Arlington County, VA |
| G | 4 | James IV West | 6 ft 1 in (1.85 m) | 165 lb (75 kg) | Jr | Freedom | Woodbridge, VA |
| G | 5 | Ayan Teel | 5 ft 8 in (1.73 m) | 160 lb (73 kg) | Fr | Bishop O'Connell | Bowie, Maryland |
| G | 11 | Naim Miller | 6 ft 4 in (1.93 m) | 205 lb (93 kg) | Fr | First Love Christian Academy | Pittsburgh, PA |
| G | 12 | Odri Dedolli | 6 ft 3 in (1.91 m) | 177 lb (80 kg) | Jr | Montverde Academy | Tirana, Albania |
| F | 13 | Omar Habwe | 6 ft 6 in (1.98 m) | 225 lb (102 kg) | Jr | St. James School, Maryland | Lexington, VA |
| G | 15 | Damian Chong Qui | 5 ft 8 in (1.73 m) | 145 lb (66 kg) | So | McDonogh School | Baltimore, MD |
| F | 21 | Collin Nnamene | 6 ft 8 in (2.03 m) | 210 lb (95 kg) | So | St. Albans School | Enugu State, Nigeria |
| F | 22 | Nana Opoku | 6 ft 8 in (2.03 m) | 186 lb (84 kg) | RS So | Potomac | Woodbridge, VA |
| G | 23 | Brandon Leftwich | 6 ft 4 in (1.93 m) | 180 lb (82 kg) | RS Jr | Xaverian | Brooklyn, NY |
| F | 34 | Jalen Jefferson | 6 ft 7 in (2.01 m) | 190 lb (86 kg) | So | Hopewell | Hopewell, VA |
| F | 42 | Malik Jefferson | 6 ft 9 in (2.06 m) | 230 lb (104 kg) | So | Hopewell | Hopewell, VA |

Head coach

- Dan Engelstad (St. Mary's College (MD))

Assistant coach(es)

- Will Holland (Mount St. Mary's)
- Xavier Joyner (Husson)
- Matt Miller (St. Mary's College (MD))

Legend

- (C) Team captain
- (S) Suspended
- (I) Ineligible
- (W) Walk-on
- Injured
- Current redshirt

Roster
Last update: October 9, 2024

== Schedule and results ==
| Date time, TV | Rank^{#} | Opponent^{#} | Result | Record | Site (attendance) city, state |
Non-conference regular season
| November 6, 2019*; 7:00 p.m., CBSSN | | at Georgetown | L 68–81 | 0–1 | Capital One Arena (5,214); Washington, DC |
| November 9, 2019*; 7:00 p.m. | | Gettysburg | W 75–58 | 1–1 | Knott Arena (2,062); Emmitsburg, MD |
| November 12, 2019*; 9:00 p.m., P12N | | at No. 20 Washington | L 46–56 | 1–2 | Hec Edmundson Pavilion (7,480); Seattle, WA |
| November 15, 2019*; 8:00 p.m., ESPN3 | | at Lamar; Big Blue Nation Showcase | L 61–76 | 1–3 | Montagne Center (1,590); Beaumont, TX |
| November 20, 2019*; 7:00 p.m. | | at UAB; Big Blue Nation Showcase | L 51–58 | 1–4 | Bartow Arena (2,667); Birmingham, AL |
| November 22, 2019*; 7:00 p.m., SECN | | at No. 9 Kentucky; Big Blue Nation Showcase | L 62–82 | 1–5 | Rupp Arena (20,351); Lexington, KY |
| November 26, 2019*; 7:00 p.m. | | Utah Valley; Big Blue Nation Showcase | W 64–61 | 2–5 | Knott Arena (1,405); Emmitsburg, MD |
| November 30, 2019*; 6:00 p.m. | | at Howard | W 73–56 | 3–5 | Burr Gymnasium (875); Washington, D.C. |
| December 3, 2019*; 10:00 p.m. | | at Grand Canyon | L 67–75 ^{OT} | 3–6 | GCU Arena (6,785); Phoenix, AZ |
| December 7, 2019*; 4:00 p.m. | | Loyola (MD) | L 48–64 | 3–7 | Knott Arena (1,811); Emmitsburg, MD |
| December 17, 2019*; 7:00 p.m. | | American | L 76–82 | 3–8 | Knott Arena (1,206); Emmitsburg, MD |
| December 20, 2019*; 1:00 p.m. | | at Navy | L 48–59 | 3–9 | Alumni Hall (921); Annapolis, MD |
| December 28, 2019*; 7:00 p.m. | | Coppin State | W 79–55 | 4–9 | Knott Arena (1,703); Emmitsburg, MD |
NEC regular season
| January 2, 2020; 7:00 p.m. | | Wagner | L 47–66 | 4–10 (0–1) | Knott Arena (1,267); Emmitsburg, MD |
| January 4, 2020; 2:00 p.m., CBSSN | | LIU | W 82–73 ^{2OT} | 5–10 (1–1) | Knott Arena (1,401); Emmitsburg, MD |
| January 9, 2020; 7:00 p.m. | | at Merrimack | L 61–64 | 5–11 (1–2) | Merrimack Athletics Complex (245); North Andover, MA |
| January 11, 2020; 4:00 p.m. | | at Bryant | W 67–65 | 6–11 (2–2) | Chace Athletic Center (1,151); Smithfield, RI |
| January 18, 2020; 4:00 p.m. | | Central Connecticut | W 79–52 | 7–11 (3–2) | Knott Arena (1,426); Emmitsburg, MD |
| January 20, 2020; 7:00 p.m. | | St. Francis Brooklyn | W 59–39 | 8–11 (4–2) | Knott Arena (1,726); Emmitsburg, MD |
| January 25, 2020; 5:00 p.m. | | Bryant | W 79–76 | 9–11 (5–2) | Knott Arena (3,121); Emmitsburg, MD |
| January 30, 2020; 11:00 a.m. | | at Sacred Heart | L 53–58 | 9–12 (5–3) | William H. Pitt Center (1,504); Fairfield, CT |
| February 1, 2020; 3:30 p.m. | | at Fairleigh Dickinson | L 75–85 | 9–13 (5–4) | Rothman Center (452); Hackensack, NJ |
| February 6, 2020; 7:00 p.m. | | at LIU | W 67–63 | 10–13 (6–4) | Steinberg Wellness Center (418); Brooklyn, NY |
| February 8, 2020; 4:00 p.m. | | at St. Francis Brooklyn | L 67–70 | 10–14 (6–5) | Generoso Pope Athletic Complex (607); Brooklyn, NY |
| February 13, 2020; 7:00 p.m., ESPN3/MASN | | Robert Morris | L 60–77 | 10–15 (6–6) | Knott Arena (1,754); Emmitsburg, MD |
| February 15, 2020; 4:00 p.m. | | Saint Francis (PA) | L 55–70 | 10–16 (6–7) | Knott Arena (2,724); Emmitsburg, MD |
| February 18, 2019; 7:00 p.m. | | at Wagner | L 61–67 | 10–17 (6–8) | Spiro Sports Center (1,039); Staten Island, NY |
| February 21, 2020; 7:00 p.m. | | at Robert Morris | L 60–68 | 10–18 (6–9) | UPMC Events Center (2,018); Moon Township, PA |
| February 23, 2020; 3:00 p.m. | | Merrimack | W 65–57 | 11–18 (7–9) | Knott Arena (2,078); Emmitsburg, MD |
| February 27, 2020; 7:00 p.m. | | at Saint Francis (PA) | L 62–75 | 11–19 (7–10) | DeGol Arena (726); Loretto, PA |
| February 29, 2020; 4:00 p.m. | | Fairleigh Dickinson | L 77–83 | 11–20 (7–11) | Knott Arena (1,860); Emmitsburg, MD |
NEC tournament
| March 4, 2020; 7:00 p.m., NEC Front Row | (6) | at (3) Sacred Heart; Quarterfinals | L 59–61 | 11–21 | William H. Pitt Center (502); Fairfield, CT |
*Non-conference game. ^{#}Rankings from AP poll. (#) Tournament seedings in parentheses. All times are in Eastern.
