= Isaiah Blackmon =

American basketball player (born 1996)

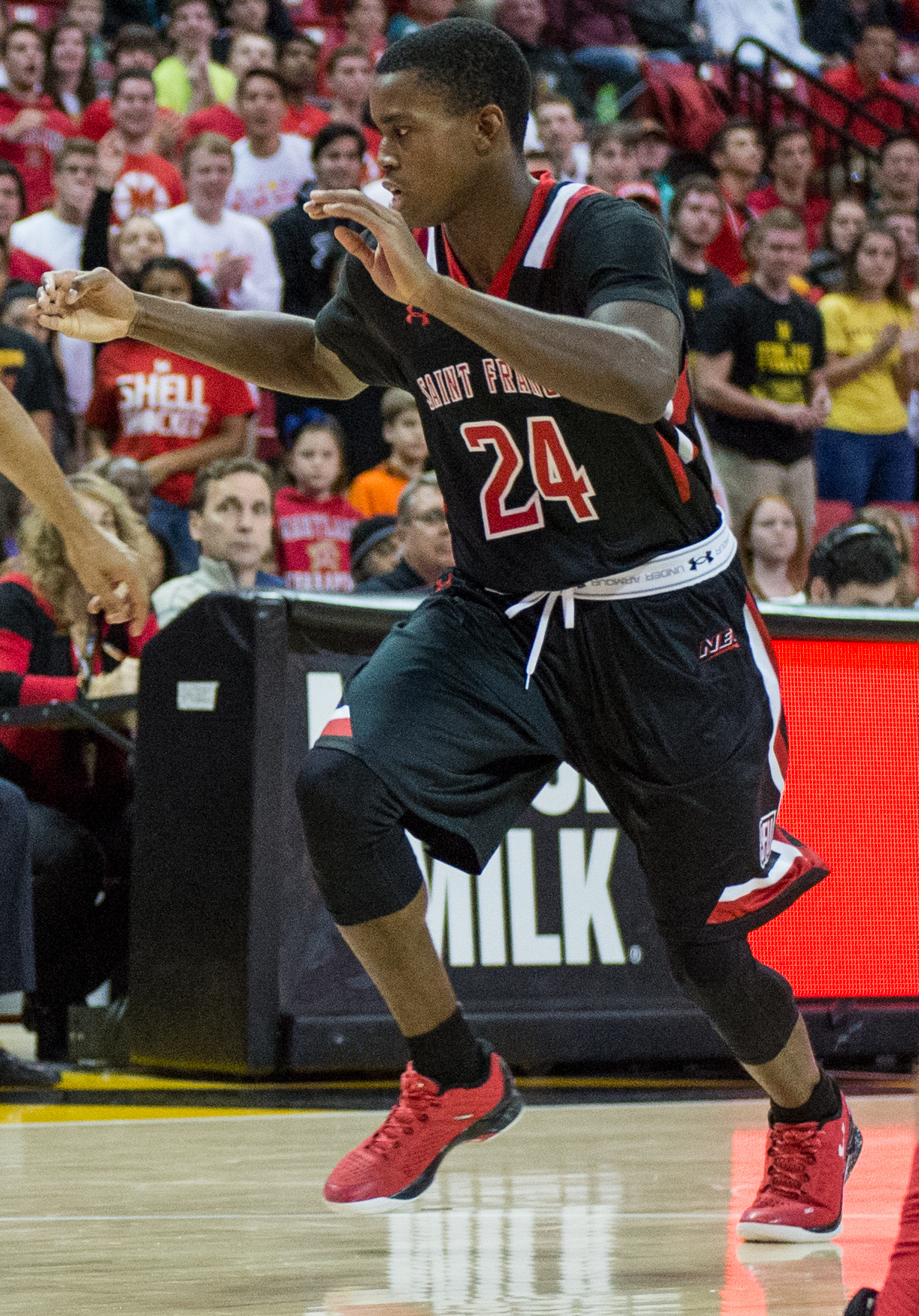

Personal information
- Born: March 8, 1996 (age 30)
- Listed height: 6 ft 1 in (1.85 m)
- Listed weight: 170 lb (77 kg)

Career information
- High school: West Charlotte (Charlotte, North Carolina)
- College: Saint Francis (PA) (2015–2020)
- NBA draft: 2020: undrafted
- Playing career: 2020–present
- Position: Shooting guard / small forward

Career history
- 2020: Beşiktaş

Career highlights
- NEC Player of the Year (2020); First-team All-NEC (2020); Third-team All-NEC (2017)

Isaiah Michael Blackmon (born March 8, 1996) is an American former basketball player. He played college basketball for the Saint Francis Red Flash and professionally for Beşiktaş of the Basketball Super League (BSL).

== Early life ==
Blackmon grew up in Charlotte, North Carolina and attended West Charlotte High School. He averaged 17 points and seven rebounds per game as a senior. Despite drawing some interest from Old Dominion, he was not offered a scholarship. Blackmon committed to play college basketball at Saint Francis University, his only Division I offer.

== College career ==
Blackmon served as a key reserve and occasional starter as a true freshman, averaging 9.7 points per game before missing the final eight games of the season due to a knee injury. As a sophomore, he became the team's starting shooting guard and was named third team All-Northeast Conference after averaging 13.7 points per game. Blackmon suffered another knee injury three games into his junior year and was forced to use a medical redshirt. He was averaging 14.3 points per game in three games. He returned to the starting lineup as a redshirt junior and averaged 12.2 points per game. On February 18, 2020, Blackmon scored a career-high 30 points in addition to seven rebounds and four steals in a win over Robert Morris. As a redshirt senior, Blackmon was named the Northeast Conference Player of the Year. Blackmon averaged 18.8 points, 5.3 rebounds, and 1.7 steals on 45% shooting from the field and 41% shooting from three-point range.

== Professional career ==
On July 3, 2020, Blackmon signed with Beşiktaş of the Turkish Basketball Super League (BSL).

== Career statistics ==
Legend
GP	Games played	GS	Games started	MPG	Minutes per game
FG%	Field goal percentage	3P%	3-point field goal percentage	FT%	Free throw percentage
RPG	Rebounds per game	APG	Assists per game	SPG	Steals per game
BPG	Blocks per game	PPG	Points per game	**Bold**	Career high

=== College ===
Year	Team	GP	GS	MPG	FG%	3P%	FT%	RPG	APG	SPG	BPG	PPG
2015–16	Saint Francis	19	4	22.6	**.538**	.400	.711	3.4	1.3	1.0	**.3**	9.7
2016–17	Saint Francis	31	21	27.3	.478	**.500**	.735	4.4	1.4	1.0	.1	13.7
2017–18	Saint Francis	3	3	28.0	.432	.300	.727	3.0	1.0	**1.7**	**.3**	14.3
2018–19	Saint Francis	**32**	19	29.0	.406	.380	.726	4.8	.9	1.1	**.3**	12.2
2019–20	Saint Francis	30	**30**	**34.1**	.449	.412	**.832**	**5.3**	**1.5**	**1.7**	**.3**	**18.8**
Career		115	77	28.8	.454	.420	.762	4.5	1.3	1.2	.3	14.0
