= 2020 Northeast Conference men's basketball tournament =

- Classification: Division I
- Season: 2019–20
- Teams: 8
- Site: Campus sites Moon Township, PA
- Champions: Robert Morris (9th title)
- Winning coach: Andrew Toole (2nd title)
- MVP: Dante Treacy (RMU)
- Television: NEC Front Row, ESPN3, ESPN2

2019–20 Northeast Conference men's basketball standings
	Conf.				Overall
Team	W		L	PCT	W		L	PCT
Merrimack*	14	–	4	.778	20	–	11	.645
Robert Morris †	13	–	5	.722	20	–	14	.588
Saint Francis (PA)	13	–	5	.722	22	–	10	.688
Sacred Heart	12	–	6	.667	20	–	13	.606
LIU	9	–	9	.500	15	–	18	.455
Fairleigh Dickinson	9	–	9	.500	11	–	19	.367
Mount St. Mary's	7	–	11	.389	11	–	21	.344
Bryant	7	–	11	.389	15	–	17	.469
St. Francis Brooklyn	7	–	11	.389	13	–	18	.419
Wagner	5	–	13	.278	8	–	21	.276
Central Connecticut	3	–	15	.167	4	–	27	.129
† 2020 NEC tournament winner * Ineligible for NEC championship (reclassification from Division II)

The 2020 Northeast Conference men's basketball tournament was the postseason men's basketball tournament for the Northeast Conference for the 2019–20 NCAA Division I men's basketball season. All tournament games are played at the home arena of the highest seed. The tournament took place March 4–10, 2020.

== Seeds ==
The top eight postseason-eligible teams in the Northeast Conference will compete in the conference tournament. Teams will be seeded by record within the conference, with a tiebreaker system to seed teams with identical conference records.

- Note: Merrimack College joined the Northeast Conference from Division II Northeast-10 Conference. The Warriors will not be eligible for the NEC Tournament until 2024.

Seed	School	Conference	Tiebreaker	Tiebreaker 2
DNQ	Merrimack	14–4		
1	Robert Morris	13–5	1–1 vs. Saint Francis (PA)	1–1 vs. Merrimack
2	Saint Francis (PA)	13–5	1–1 vs. Robert Morris	0–1 vs. Merrimack
3	Sacred Heart	12–6		
4	LIU	9–9	2–0 vs Fairleigh Dickinson	
5	Fairleigh Dickinson	9–9	0–2 vs LIU	
6	Mount St. Mary's	7–11	3–1 vs. Bryant/St. Francis Brooklyn	
7	Bryant	7–11	2–2 vs. Mount St. Mary's/St. Francis Brooklyn	
8	St. Francis Brooklyn	7–11	1–3 vs. Mount St. Mary's/Bryant	
DNQ	Wagner	5–13		
DNQ	Central Connecticut	3–15		

== Schedule and results ==
Game	Time	Matchup	Score	Television
Quarterfinals – Wednesday, March 4
1	7:00 pm	No. 1 Robert Morris vs. No. 8 St. Francis Brooklyn	59–58	NEC Front Row
2	7:00 pm	No. 4 LIU vs. No. 5 Fairleigh Dickinson	73–72	NEC Front Row
3	7:00 pm	No. 3 Sacred Heart vs. No. 6 Mount St. Mary's	61–59	NEC Front Row
4	7:00 pm	No. 2 Saint Francis (PA) vs. No. 7 Bryant	87–61	NEC Front Row
Semifinals – Saturday, March 7
5	12:00 pm	No. 3 Sacred Heart vs No. 2 Saint Francis (PA)	72–84	ESPN3
6	2:00 pm	No. 1 Robert Morris vs No. 4 LIU	86–66	ESPN3
Final – Tuesday, March 10
7	7:00 pm	No. 2 Saint Francis (PA) vs No. 1 Robert Morris	67–77	ESPN2
Game times in EST through Semifinals. Game times in EDT through Finals. Rankings denote tournament seed

Note: Bracket is re-seeded after quarterfinal matchups, with highest remaining seed playing the lowest remaining seed in the semifinals.

== Bracket and results ==
Teams are reseeded after each round with highest remaining seeds receiving home court advantage.

Quarterfinals; Wednesday, March 4, 2020; NEC Front Row
1	Robert Morris	59
8	St. Francis Brooklyn	58
4	LIU	73
5	Fairleigh Dickinson	72
(Pairings are reseeded after the first round)
3	Sacred Heart	61
6	Mount St. Mary's	59
2	Saint Francis (PA)	87
7	Bryant	61

Semifinals; Saturday, March 7, 2020; ESPN3
1	Robert Morris	86
4	LIU	66
3	Sacred Heart	72
2	Saint Francis (PA)	84

Championship; Tuesday, March 10, 2020; ESPN2
1	Robert Morris	77
2	Saint Francis (PA)	67

== All-tournament team ==
Tournament MVP in bold.

Name	School
**Dante Treacy**	Robert Morris
Josh Williams	Robert Morris
Keith Braxton	Saint Francis (PA)
AJ Bramah	Robert Morris
Isaiah Blackmon	Saint Francis (PA)

== See also ==
- 2020 Northeast Conference women's basketball tournament
