= 2019–20 Merrimack Warriors men's basketball team =

American college basketball season

2019–20 Merrimack Warriors men's basketball

NEC regular-season champions
- Conference: Northeast Conference
- Record: 20–11 (14–4 NEC)
- Head coach: Joe Gallo (4th season)
- Assistant coaches: Micky Burtnyk (11th season); Phil Gaetano (2nd season)
- Home arena: Merrimack Athletics Complex

2019–20 Northeast Conference men's basketball standings
	Conf.				Overall
Team	W		L	PCT	W		L	PCT
Merrimack*	14	–	4	.778	20	–	11	.645
Robert Morris †	13	–	5	.722	20	–	14	.588
Saint Francis (PA)	13	–	5	.722	22	–	10	.688
Sacred Heart	12	–	6	.667	20	–	13	.606
LIU	9	–	9	.500	15	–	18	.455
Fairleigh Dickinson	9	–	9	.500	11	–	19	.367
Mount St. Mary's	7	–	11	.389	11	–	21	.344
Bryant	7	–	11	.389	15	–	17	.469
St. Francis Brooklyn	7	–	11	.389	13	–	18	.419
Wagner	5	–	13	.278	8	–	21	.276
Central Connecticut	3	–	15	.167	4	–	27	.129
† 2020 NEC tournament winner * Ineligible for NEC championship (reclassification from Division II)

The 2019–20 Merrimack Warriors men's basketball team represented Merrimack College during the 2019–20 NCAA Division I men's basketball season. The Warriors were led by fourth-year head coach Joe Gallo, and played their home games at Hammel Court in North Andover, Massachusetts as first-year members of the Northeast Conference (NEC).

The season marked the school's first season in NCAA Division I. The Warriors previously participated in Division II's Northeast-10 Conference (NE10). As part of their transition to Division I, the Warriors were not eligible for postseason play, including the NEC tournament, until 2024.

On February 27, 2020, Merrimack defeated Central Connecticut 69–58 to clinch at least a share of the Northeast Conference regular-season title. The Warriors became the first men's basketball team to record a 20-win season in its first Division I season. Due to NCAA rules for schools transitioning to D-I, the Warriors were ineligible to play in NCAA-sponsored postseason events (the NCAA tournament and the NIT), and under NEC rules were ineligible for the conference tournament. Two days later, Robert Morris's 78–68 win over Saint Francis (PA) gave the Warriors the outright regular-season NEC title, making them the first men's basketball program to win an outright conference title in its first D-I season. Contrary to an Associated Press report, the Warriors were eligible for non-NCAA postseason events. They were a candidate for an invitation to the 2020 CollegeInsider.com Postseason Tournament. However, the CIT and all postseason tournaments were cancelled amid the COVID-19 pandemic.

== Previous season ==
The Warriors finished the 2018–19 season 22–10, 14–7 in conference play, to finish in second place in the Northeast Division of the NE10. They won the NE10 tournament championship to earn the conference's automatic bid to the NCAA Division II tournament. As the No. 2 seed in the East Regional, they lost in the first round to Dominican (NY).

== Roster ==
2019–20 Merrimack Warriors men's basketball team
Players
Coaches

Pos.	#	Name	Height	Weight	Year	Hometown
G	0	Juvaris Hayes	6 ft 0 in (1.83 m)	185 lb (84 kg)	Sr	Paterson, NJ
G	1	Khalief Crawford	6 ft 1 in (1.85 m)	190 lb (86 kg)	Jr	Linden, NJ
G	3	Mykel Derring	6 ft 2 in (1.88 m)	170 lb (77 kg)	Fr	Boston, MA
G	4	Ethan Helwig	6 ft 4 in (1.93 m)	180 lb (82 kg)	Fr	Aurora, IL
G	5	Mikey Watkins	5 ft 11 in (1.8 m)	175 lb (79 kg)	So	Roselle, NJ
G	10	Jaylen Davis	6 ft 3 in (1.91 m)	193 lb (88 kg)	Fr	Deer Park, NY
G	11	Ryan Miller	6 ft 2 in (1.88 m)	195 lb (88 kg)	So	Weston, MA
G	13	Jaleel Lord	6 ft 4 in (1.93 m)	170 lb (77 kg)	Sr	Jersey City, NJ
G/F	14	Devin Jensen	6 ft 5 in (1.96 m)	195 lb (88 kg)	Jr	Brielle, NJ
F	15	Idris Joyner	6 ft 5 in (1.96 m)	215 lb (98 kg)	Sr	Plainfield, NJ
F	22	Jordan Minor	6 ft 8 in (2.03 m)	220 lb (100 kg)	Fr	Kingston, MA
G/F	23	Ziggy Reid	6 ft 5 in (1.96 m)	235 lb (107 kg)	Fr	Baltimore, MD
G/F	24	Jordan McKoy	6 ft 5 in (1.96 m)	170 lb (77 kg)	Fr	Westwood, NJ
F	31	Justin Connolly	6 ft 7 in (2.01 m)	200 lb (91 kg)	So	Melrose, MA
F	34	Aaron Jaynes	6 ft 6 in (1.98 m)	220 lb (100 kg)	So	Framingham, MA

Head coach

- Joe Gallo (Merrimack)

Assistant coach(es)

- Micky Burtnyk (Merrimack)
- Phil Gaetano (Sacred Heart)

Legend

- (C) Team captain
- (S) Suspended
- (I) Ineligible
- (W) Walk-on
- Injured
- Current redshirt

Roster
Last update: October 25, 2024

== Schedule and results ==
Date time, TV	Opponent	Result	Record	Site (attendance) city, state
Exhibition
October 31, 2019*; 7:00 p.m.	Maine–Fort Kent	W 87–26		Hammel Court; North Andover, MA
Non-conference regular season
November 6, 2019*; 7:00 p.m.	at Maine	L 64–84	0–1	Cross Insurance Center (1,089); Bangor, ME
November 8, 2018*; 7:00 p.m., BTN Plus	at Northwestern	W 71–61	1–1	Welsh-Ryan Arena (5,014); Evanston, IL
November 15, 2019*; 4:30 p.m.	vs. Dartmouth; River Hawk Invitational	L 46–56	1–2	Costello Athletic Center (1,166); Lowell, MA
November 16, 2019*; 4:00 p.m., ESPN3	at UMass Lowell; River Hawk Invitational	W 60–58	2–2	Costello Athletic Center (696); Lowell, MA
November 17, 2019*; 1:00 p.m.	vs. Jacksonville; River Hawk Invitational	W 54–44	3–2	Costello Athletic Center (534); Lowell, MA
November 19, 2019*; 7:00 p.m., FSN	at Providence	L 56–93	3–3	Dunkin' Donuts Center (7,251); Providence, RI
November 22, 2019*; 7:00 p.m.	Lesley	W 110-16	4-3	Hammel Court (617); North Andover, MA
November 24, 2019*; 2:00 p.m., ESPN3	at Hartford	W 62–58	5–3	Reich Family Pavilion (599); West Hartford, CT
November 29, 2019*; 7:00 p.m.	at Akron	L 47–64	5–4	James A. Rhodes Arena (2,028); Akron, OH
December 4, 2019*; 7:00 p.m., ESPN+	at Brown	L 55–82	5–5	Pizzitola Sports Center (786); Providence, RI
December 11, 2019*; 7:00 p.m.	Army	W 69–60	6–5	Hammel Court (1,500); North Andover, MA
December 22, 2019*; 11:00 a.m.	at UC Santa Barbara	L 50–68	6–6	UC Santa Barbara Events Center (749); Santa Barbara, CA
December 29, 2019*; 6:00 p.m.	Boston University	L 67–69	6–7	Hammel Court (867); North Andover, MA
Northeast Conference regular season
January 2, 2020; 7:30 p.m.	at Sacred Heart	W 65–57	7–7 (1–0)	William H. Pitt Center (376); Fairfield, CT
January 4, 2020; 4:00 p.m.	Robert Morris	L 58–69	7–8 (1–1)	Hammel Court (603); North Andover, MA
January 9, 2020; 7:00 p.m.	Mount St. Mary's	W 64–61	8–8 (2–1)	Hammel Court (245); North Andover, MA
January 11, 2020; 3:30 p.m.	at Central Connecticut	W 58–46	9–8 (3–1)	William H. Detrick Gymnasium (1,126); New Britain, CT
January 15, 2020; 7:00 p.m.	Bryant	W 71–67	10–8 (4–1)	Hammel Court (827); North Andover, MA
January 18, 2020; 4:00 p.m.	at Robert Morris	W 53–49	11–8 (5–1)	UPMC Events Center (1,605); Moon Township, PA
January 20, 2020; 4:00 p.m.	at Saint Francis (PA)	W 72–55	12–8 (6–1)	DeGol Arena (1,080); Loretto, PA
January 23, 2020; 7:00 p.m.	Fairleigh Dickinson	W 74–71 ^{2OT}	13–8 (7–1)	Hammel Court (955); North Andover, MA
January 30, 2020; 7:00 p.m.	St. Francis Brooklyn	W 61–50	14–8 (8–1)	Hammel Court (984); North Andover, MA
February 1, 2020; 4:00 p.m.	LIU	W 70–59	15–8 (9–1)	Hammel Court (1,471); North Andover, MA
February 6, 2020; 7:00 p.m., ESPN3	at Fairleigh Dickinson	W 57–53	16–8 (10–1)	Rothman Center (1,046); Hackensack, NJ
February 8, 2020; 4:30 p.m.	at LIU	L 64–67 ^{OT}	16–9 (10–2)	Steinberg Wellness Center (826); Brooklyn, NY
February 13, 2020; 7:00 p.m.	at St. Francis Brooklyn	W 60–50	17–9 (11–2)	Generoso Pope Athletic Complex (608); Brooklyn, NY
February 15, 2020; 4:00 p.m., ESPN+	Wagner	W 68–59	18–9 (12–2)	Hammel Court (1,500); North Andover, MA
February 18, 2020; 7:00 p.m.	at Bryant	L 52–61	18–10 (12–3)	Chace Athletic Center (1,482); Smithfield, RI
February 21, 2020; 7:30 p.m.	Sacred Heart	W 64–57	19–10 (13–3)	Hammel Court (1,500); North Andover, MA
February 23, 2020; 3:00 p.m.	at Mount St. Mary's	L 57–65	19–11 (13–4)	Knott Arena (2,078); Emmitsburg, MD
February 27, 2020; 7:00 p.m.	Central Connecticut	W 69–58	20–11 (14–4)	Hammel Court (1,404); North Andover, MA
*Non-conference game. ^{#}Rankings from AP poll. (#) Tournament seedings in parentheses. All times are in Eastern.
