= 2019–20 Robert Morris Colonials men's basketball team =

American college basketball season

2019–20 Robert Morris Colonials men's basketball

NEC tournament champions
- Conference: Northeast Conference
- Record: 20–14 (13–5 NEC)
- Head coach: Andrew Toole (10th season)
- Assistant coaches: Dave Fedor; Tray Woodall; Mike Iuzzolino
- Home arena: UPMC Events Center

2019–20 Northeast Conference men's basketball standings
	Conf.				Overall
Team	W		L	PCT	W		L	PCT
Merrimack*	14	–	4	.778	20	–	11	.645
Robert Morris †	13	–	5	.722	20	–	14	.588
Saint Francis (PA)	13	–	5	.722	22	–	10	.688
Sacred Heart	12	–	6	.667	20	–	13	.606
LIU	9	–	9	.500	15	–	18	.455
Fairleigh Dickinson	9	–	9	.500	11	–	19	.367
Mount St. Mary's	7	–	11	.389	11	–	21	.344
Bryant	7	–	11	.389	15	–	17	.469
St. Francis Brooklyn	7	–	11	.389	13	–	18	.419
Wagner	5	–	13	.278	8	–	21	.276
Central Connecticut	3	–	15	.167	4	–	27	.129
† 2020 NEC tournament winner * Ineligible for NEC championship (reclassification from Division II)

The 2019–20 Robert Morris Colonials men's basketball team represented Robert Morris University during the 2019–20 NCAA Division I men's basketball season. The Colonials, led by tenth-year head coach Andrew Toole, played their home games at the UPMC Events Center in Moon Township, Pennsylvania as members of the Northeast Conference. They finished the season 20–15, 13–5 in NEC play to finish in a tie for second place. They defeated St. Francis Brooklyn, LIU and Saint Francis (PA) to be champions of the NEC tournament. They earned the NEC's automatic bid before the tournament was cancelled due to the COVID-19 pandemic.

On June 15, 2020, Robert Morris announced that this would be the last season for the team in the NEC as they will join the Horizon League on July 1, 2020.

== Previous season ==
The Colonials finished the 2018–19 season 18–17, 11–7 in NEC play to finish in fourth place. As the No. 4 seed in the NEC tournament, they defeated No. 5 seed St. Francis Brooklyn in the quarterfinals before losing in the semifinals to No. 2 seed Fairleigh Dickinson. They were invited to the 2019 CollegeInsider.com Postseason Tournament where they defeated Cornell in the first round before falling to Presbyterian College in the second round.

== Roster ==
2019–20 Robert Morris Colonials men's basketball team
Players
Coaches

Pos.	#	Name	Height	Weight	Year	Previous school	Hometown
G	0	Josh Williams	6 ft 2 in (1.88 m)	195 lb (88 kg)	RS Sr	St. Vincent–St. Mary	Akron, OH
G	1	Jon Williams	6 ft 1 in (1.85 m)	175 lb (79 kg)	Jr	St. Vincent–St. Mary	Akron, OH
F	2	DJ Russell	6 ft 7 in (2.01 m)	210 lb (95 kg)	Jr	Potter's House Christian Academy	Jacksonville, FL
G	3	Dante Treacy	6 ft 0 in (1.83 m)	170 lb (77 kg)	So	Central Florida Christian Academy	Orlando, FL
G	4	Jalen Hawkins	6 ft 3 in (1.91 m)	185 lb (84 kg)	So	Proctor	Utica, NY
G/F	5	AJ Bramah	6 ft 7 in (2.01 m)	185 lb (84 kg)	So	San Leandro	San Leandro, CA
G	12	Sayveon McEwen	6 ft 0 in (1.83 m)	185 lb (84 kg)	Sr	Paducah Tilghman	Paducah, KY
G	13	Terrell Brown	6 ft 2 in (1.88 m)	185 lb (84 kg)	Fr	Proctor Academy	Lowell, MA
F	15	Yannis Mendy	6 ft 8 in (2.03 m)	240 lb (109 kg)	Sr	Lycee Saint John Perse	Metting, France
F	20	Charles Bain	6 ft 8 in (2.03 m)	200 lb (91 kg)	Jr	St. John's Northwestern Military Academy	Freeport, Bahamas
G	22	Cameron Wilbon	6 ft 5 in (1.96 m)	200 lb (91 kg)	So	Merrillville	Merrillville, IN
F	23	Olisa Ngonadi	6 ft 8 in (2.03 m)	185 lb (84 kg)	Fr	National Christian Academy	Fort Washington, MD
G/F	24	Deshawndre Washington	6 ft 7 in (2.01 m)	180 lb (82 kg)	Fr	Morgan Park	Chicago, IL

Head coach

- Andrew Toole (Pennsylvania)

Assistant coach(es)

- Dave Fedor (Rutgers)
- Tray Woodall (Pittsburgh)
- Mike Iuzzolino (Saint Francis (PA))

Legend

- (C) Team captain
- (S) Suspended
- (I) Ineligible
- (W) Walk-on
- Injured
- Current redshirt

Roster
Last update: October 16, 2019

== Schedule and results ==
Date time, TV	Rank^{#}	Opponent^{#}	Result	Record	Site (attendance) city, state
Non-conference regular season
November 7, 2019*; 7:00 pm		at Marshall; MABC Invitational	L 60–67	0–1	Cam Henderson Center (5,530); Huntington, WV
November 9, 2019*; 12:00 pm, ACCNX		at Notre Dame; MABC Invitational	L 57–92	0–2	Edmund P. Joyce Center (6,422); South Bend, IN
November 12, 2019*; 6:00 pm, ESPNU		Pittsburgh	L 57–71	0–3	UPMC Events Center (4,034); Moon Township, PA
November 15, 2019*; 2:00 pm		vs. Howard; MABC Invitational	W 85–65	1–3	Savage Arena (75); Toledo, OH
November 16, 2019*; 2:00 pm		at Toledo; MABC Invitational	L 56–70	1–4	Savage Arena (4,231); Toledo, OH
November 21, 2019*; 7:00 pm		at UIC	L 62–72	1–5	Credit Union 1 Arena (1,766); Chicago, IL
November 23, 2019*; 2:00 pm, FS2		at Marquette	L 62–66	1–6	Fiserv Forum (14,136); Milwaukee, WI
November 27, 2019*; 7:00 pm		Geneva	W 102–62	2–6	UPMC Events Center (1,053); Moon Township, PA
November 30, 2019*; 6:00 pm		at Cleveland State	L 59–70	2–7	Wolstein Center (1,031); Cleveland, OH
December 4, 2019*; 7:00 pm, ESPN3		at Youngstown State	L 70–81	2–8	Beeghly Center (1,417); Youngstown, OH
December 7, 2019*; 7:00 pm		at Florida Gulf Coast	W 64–59	3–8	Alico Arena (2,341); Fort Myers, FL
December 17, 2019*; 7:00 pm		Central Michigan	W 83–79	4–8	UPMC Events Center (689); Moon Township, PA
December 21, 2019*; 3:00 pm		at UNLV	L 69–81	4–9	Thomas & Mack Center (6,910); Las Vegas, NV
NEC regular season
January 2, 2020; 7:00 pm		at Central Connecticut	W 89–78	5–9 (1–0)	William H. Detrick Gymnasium (1,096); New Britain, CT
January 4, 2020; 4:00 pm		at Merrimack	W 69–58	6–9 (2–0)	Merrimack Athletics Complex (603); North Andover, MA
January 9, 2020; 7:00 pm		St. Francis Brooklyn	W 78–52	7–9 (3–0)	UPMC Events Center (611); Moon Township, PA
January 11, 2020; 1:00 pm		Wagner	W 94–62	8–9 (4–0)	UPMC Events Center (1,097); Moon Township, PA
January 18, 2020; 1:00 pm		Merrimack	L 49–53	8–10 (4–1)	UPMC Events Center (1,605); Moon Township, PA
January 20, 2020; 5:00 pm, CBSSN		Sacred Heart	W 67–55	9–10 (5–1)	UPMC Events Center (1,572); Moon Township, PA
January 23, 2020; 7:00 pm		at St. Francis Brooklyn	L 57–78	9–11 (5–2)	Generoso Pope Athletic Complex (676); Brooklyn, NY
January 25, 2020; 4:30 pm		at LIU	W 71–66	10–11 (6–2)	Steinberg Wellness Center (634); Brooklyn, NY
January 30, 2020; 7:00 pm		Bryant	W 64–54	11–11 (7–2)	UPMC Events Center (1,513); Moon Township, PA
February 1, 2020; 1:00 pm		Central Connecticut	W 64–57	12–11 (8–2)	UPMC Events Center (2,353); Moon Township, PA
February 6, 2020; 7:00 pm		at Wagner	W 67–62	13–11 (9–2)	Spiro Sports Center (1,253); Staten Island, NY
February 8, 2020; 3:00 pm		at Sacred Heart	W 61–58	14–11 (10–2)	William H. Pitt Center (1,008); Fairfield, CT
February 13, 2020; 7:00 pm, ESPN3/MASN		at Mount St. Mary's	W 77–60	15–11 (11–2)	Knott Arena (1,754); Emmitsburg, MD
February 15, 2020; 1:00 pm		Fairleigh Dickinson	L 71–72	15–12 (11–3)	UPMC Events Center (1,794); Moon Township, PA
February 18, 2020; 7:00 pm		at Saint Francis (PA)	L 71–86	15–13 (11–4)	DeGol Arena (1,410); Loretto, PA
February 21, 2020; 7:00 pm		Mount St. Mary's	W 68–60	16–13 (12–4)	UPMC Events Center (2,018); Moon Township, PA
February 23, 2020; 3:30 pm		at Fairleigh Dickinson	L 70–75	16–14 (12–5)	Rothman Center (1,010); Teaneck, NJ
February 29, 2020; 1:00 pm		Saint Francis (PA)	W 78–68	17–14 (13–5)	UPMC Events Center (2,174); Moon Township, PA
NEC tournament
March 4, 2020; 7:00 pm, NEC Front Row	(1)	(8) St. Francis Brooklyn; Quarterfinals	W 59–58	18–14	UPMC Events Center (659); Moon Township, PA
March 7, 2020; 2:00 pm, ESPN3	(1)	(4) LIU; Semifinals	W 86–66	19–14	UPMC Events Center (1,342); Moon Township, PA
March 10, 2020; 7:00 pm, ESPN2	(1)	(2) Saint Francis (PA); Championship	W 77–67	20–14	UPMC Events Center (4,034); Moon Township, PA
NCAA tournament
			Cancelled due to the COVID-19 pandemic		
*Non-conference game. ^{#}Rankings from AP Poll. (#) Tournament seedings in parentheses. All times are in Eastern.
