= 2019–20 Saint Francis Red Flash men's basketball team =

American college basketball season

2019–20 Saint Francis Red Flash men's basketball
- Conference: Northeast Conference
- Record: 22–10 (13–5 NEC)
- Head coach: Rob Krimmel (8th season)
- Associate head coach: Andrew Helton
- Assistant coaches: Eric Taylor; Umar Shannon
- Home arena: DeGol Arena

2019–20 Northeast Conference men's basketball standings
	Conf.				Overall
Team	W		L	PCT	W		L	PCT
Merrimack*	14	–	4	.778	20	–	11	.645
Robert Morris †	13	–	5	.722	20	–	14	.588
Saint Francis (PA)	13	–	5	.722	22	–	10	.688
Sacred Heart	12	–	6	.667	20	–	13	.606
LIU	9	–	9	.500	15	–	18	.455
Fairleigh Dickinson	9	–	9	.500	11	–	19	.367
Mount St. Mary's	7	–	11	.389	11	–	21	.344
Bryant	7	–	11	.389	15	–	17	.469
St. Francis Brooklyn	7	–	11	.389	13	–	18	.419
Wagner	5	–	13	.278	8	–	21	.276
Central Connecticut	3	–	15	.167	4	–	27	.129
† 2020 NEC tournament winner * Ineligible for NEC championship (reclassification from Division II)

The 2019–20 Saint Francis Red Flash men's basketball team represented Saint Francis University during the 2019–20 NCAA Division I men's basketball season. The Red Flash, led by eighth-year head coach Rob Krimmel, played their home games at the DeGol Arena in Loretto, Pennsylvania as members of the Northeast Conference. They finished the season 22–10, 13–5 in NEC play to finish in a share for second place. They defeated Bryant and Sacred Heart to reach the championship game of the NEC tournament where they lost to Robert Morris. With 22 wins, they were a candidate for postseason play. However, all postseason tournaments were cancelled amid the COVID-19 pandemic.

== Previous season ==
The Red Flash finished the 2018–19 season at 18–15, 12–6 in NEC play to finish in a tie for first place. Due to tiebreakers, they were the 1-seed in the 2019 Northeast Conference men's basketball tournament. The Red Flash defeated Bryant in the quarterfinals and LIU Brooklyn in the semifinals, yet lost in the championship game to Fairleigh Dickinson. As Regular Season co-champions they received an NIT bid. Saint Francis lost to 1-seed Indiana in the first round.

== Roster ==
2019–20 Saint Francis Red Flash men's basketball team
Players
Coaches

Pos.	#	Name	Height	Weight	Year	Previous school	Hometown
G	0	Justen Anderson	6 ft 2 in (1.88 m)	170 lb (77 kg)	Fr	La Plata HS	Waldorf, MD
G	1	Ramiir Dixon-Conover	6 ft 3 in (1.91 m)	185 lb (84 kg)	Jr	Southeastern CC	Newark, NJ
G	2	Scott Meredith	6 ft 2 in (1.88 m)	180 lb (82 kg)	RS Sr	Hargrave Military Academy	Pilot Mountain, NC
G	3	Luke Ruggery	5 ft 11 in (1.8 m)	160 lb (73 kg)	Fr	Bishop Guilfoyle HS	Duncansville, PA
G	4	Randall Gaskins Jr.	6 ft 3 in (1.91 m)	195 lb (88 kg)	Sr	Bishop O'Connell HS	Woodbridge, VA
F	5	Myles Thompson	6 ft 6 in (1.98 m)	230 lb (104 kg)	So	Camden HS	Camden, NJ
G	11	Isaiah Blackmon	6 ft 1 in (1.85 m)	170 lb (77 kg)	RS Sr	West Charlotte HS	Charlotte, NC
G	13	Keith Braxton	6 ft 5 in (1.96 m)	210 lb (95 kg)	Sr	Lawrenceville School	Glassboro, NJ
G	14	A. J. Burch	5 ft 9 in (1.75 m)	165 lb (75 kg)	Fr	Severn School	Annapolis, MD
F	15	Precious Ikediashi	6 ft 8 in (2.03 m)	220 lb (100 kg)	RS Fr	Hudson Catholic HS	Hoboken, NJ
G	20	Dan Henry	5 ft 11 in (1.8 m)	160 lb (73 kg)	Jr	Hamburg HS	Hamburg, NY
G	21	Ben Seidel	6 ft 0 in (1.83 m)	170 lb (77 kg)	Fr	Bishop McCort HS	Johnstown, PA
G/F	22	Tyler Stewart	6 ft 8 in (2.03 m)	195 lb (88 kg)	RS So	Binghamton	Silver Spring, MD
G	23	A. J. Labriola (W)	6 ft 2 in (1.88 m)	185 lb (84 kg)	So	Bishop Guilfoyle HS	Altoona, PA
G	24	Bryce Laskey	6 ft 4 in (1.93 m)	190 lb (86 kg)	RS Fr	Laurel Highlands HS	Uniontown, PA
F/C	30	Deivydas Kuzavas	6 ft 10 in (2.08 m)	230 lb (104 kg)	Sr	St. Mary's Ryken HS	Kretinga, Lithuania
G	31	Brad McCabe	6 ft 6 in (1.98 m)	185 lb (84 kg)	Fr	Manasquan HS	Manasquan, NJ
F	33	Josh Cohen	6 ft 10 in (2.08 m)	220 lb (100 kg)	Fr	Christian Brothers Academy	Lincroft, NJ
F	42	Mark Flagg	6 ft 9 in (2.06 m)	215 lb (98 kg)	Jr	Pennsbury HS	Fairless Hills, PA

Head coach

- Rob Krimmel (Saint Francis (PA))

Assistant coach(es)

- Andrew Helton (Miami (OH))
- Eric Taylor (Saint Francis (PA))
- Umar Shannon (Saint Francis (PA))

Legend

- (C) Team captain
- (S) Suspended
- (I) Ineligible
- (W) Walk-on
- Injured
- Current redshirt

Roster
Last update: August 30, 2019

== Schedule and results ==
Date time, TV	Rank^{#}	Opponent^{#}	Result	Record	Site (attendance) city, state
Non-conference regular season
November 5, 2019*; 7:00 pm		at No. 25 VCU	L 58–72	0–1	Siegel Center (7,637); Richmond, VA
November 8, 2019*; 7:00 pm, ESPN+		at Richmond	L 98–100 ^{OT}	0–2	Robins Center (6,602); Richmond, VA
November 13, 2019*; 7:00 pm		at Morgan State	W 71–65	1–2	Talmadge L. Hill Field House (1,578); Baltimore, MD
November 16, 2019*; 7:00 pm, ESPN3		American	W 79–76	2–2	DeGol Arena (1,308); Loretto, PA
November 19, 2019*; 7:00 pm		Delaware	L 64–79	2–3	DeGol Arena (901); Loretto, PA
November 23, 2019*; 2:00 pm, ACCN		at Florida State	L 65–80	2–4	Donald L. Tucker Center (7,595); Tallahassee, FL
November 30, 2019*; 7:00 pm, ESPN3		at Saint Joseph's	W 79–63	3–4	Hagan Arena (2,124); Philadelphia, PA
December 4, 2019*; 7:00 pm		Lehigh	W 77–69	4–4	DeGol Arena (915); Loretto, PA
December 7, 2019*; 1:00 pm		at UMBC	W 63–60	5–4	UMBC Event Center (913); Baltimore, MD
December 17, 2019*; 7:00 pm		Franciscan	W 115–66	6–4	DeGol Arena (505); Loretto, PA
December 22, 2019*; 1:00 pm, FloSports		vs. William & Mary; D.C. Holiday Hoops fest Showcase	W 78–72	7–4	Entertainment and Sports Arena; Washington, DC
NEC regular season
January 2, 2020; 4:00 pm		at Bryant	L 63–67	7–5 (0–1)	Chace Athletic Center (408); Smithfield, RI
January 4, 2020; 3:30 pm		at Central Connecticut	W 93–69	8–5 (1–1)	William H. Detrick Gymnasium (1,026); New Britain, CT
January 9, 2020; 7:00 pm		Wagner	W 80–62	9–5 (2–1)	DeGol Arena (537); Loretto, PA
January 11, 2020; 7:00 pm		St. Francis Brooklyn	W 81–80	10–5 (3–1)	DeGol Arena (1,327); Loretto, PA
January 15, 2020; 5:00 pm, ESPNU		at Fairleigh Dickinson	W 100–85	11–5 (4–1)	Rothman Center (486); Hackensack, NJ
January 18, 2020; 7:00 pm		Sacred Heart	W 72–65	12–5 (5–1)	DeGol Arena (1,270); Loretto, PA
January 20, 2020; 4:00 pm		Merrimack	L 55–72	12–6 (5–2)	DeGol Arena (1,080); Loretto, PA
January 23, 2020; 7:00 pm		at LIU	L 81–86	12–7 (5–3)	Steinberg Wellness Center (452); Brooklyn, NY
January 25, 2020; 4:00 pm		at St. Francis Brooklyn	L 79–86	12–8 (5–4)	Generoso Pope Athletic Complex (598); Brooklyn, NY
January 30, 2020; 7:00 pm		Central Connecticut	W 84–77	13–8 (6–4)	DeGol Arena (1,008); Loretto, PA
February 1, 2020; 12:00 pm, CBSSN		Bryant	W 84–64	14–8 (7–4)	DeGol Arena (1,101); Loretto, PA
February 6, 2020; 7:00 pm		at Sacred Heart	W 70–68	15–8 (8–4)	William H. Pitt Center (401); Fairfield, CT
February 8, 2020; 4:00 pm		at Wagner	W 85–68	16–8 (9–4)	Spiro Sports Center (1,531); Staten Island, NY
February 15, 2020; 4:00 pm		at Mount St. Mary's	W 70–55	17–8 (10–4)	Knott Arena (2,724); Emmitsburg, MD
February 18, 2020; 7:00 pm		Robert Morris	W 86–71	18–8 (11–4)	DeGol Arena (1,410); Loretto, PA
February 23, 2020; 7:00 pm		LIU	W 74–71	19–8 (12–4)	DeGol Arena (1,628); Loretto, PA
February 27, 2020; 7:00 pm		Mount St. Mary's	W 75–62	20–8 (13–4)	DeGol Arena (726); Loretto, PA
February 29, 2020; 1:00 pm		at Robert Morris	L 68–78	20–9 (13–5)	UPMC Events Center (2,174); Moon Township, PA
NEC tournament
March 4, 2020; 7:00 pm, NEC Front Row	(2)	(7) Bryant; Quarterfinals	W 87–61	21–9	DeGol Arena (1,025); Loretto, PA
March 7, 2020; 12:00 pm, ESPN3	(2)	(3) Sacred Heart; Semifinals	W 84–72	22–9	DeGol Arena (1,423); Loretto, PA
March 10, 2020; 7:00 pm, ESPN2	(2)	at (1) Robert Morris; Championship	L 67–77	22–10	UPMC Events Center (4,034); Moon Township, PA
*Non-conference game. ^{#}Rankings from AP Poll. (#) Tournament seedings in parentheses. All times are in Eastern Time. Source.
