= 2019–20 Bryant Bulldogs men's basketball team =

American college basketball season

2019–20 Bryant Bulldogs men's basketball
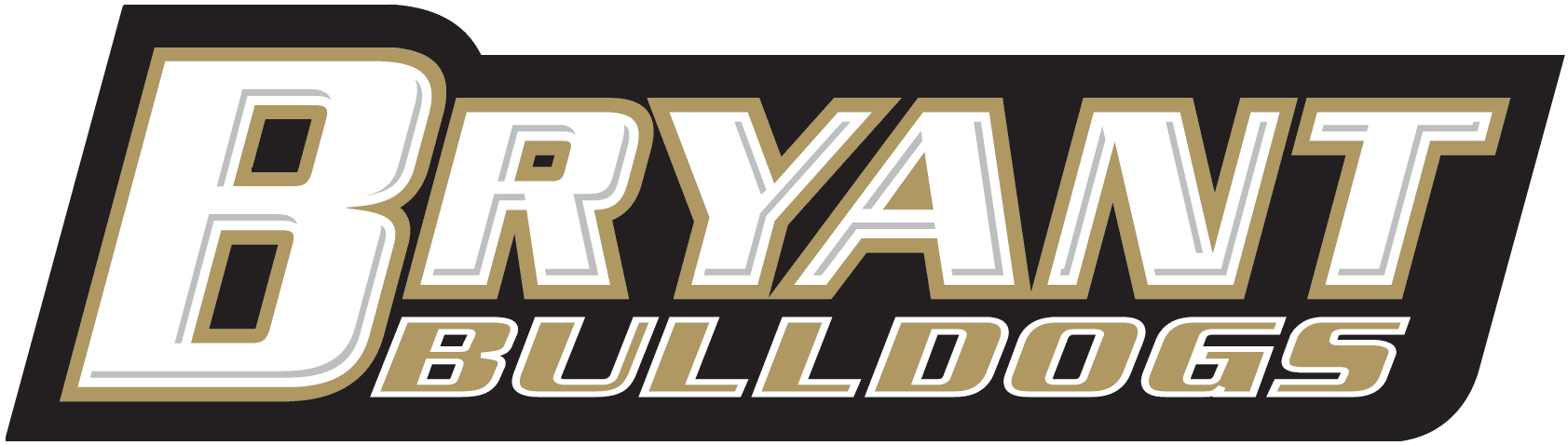
- Conference: Northeast Conference
- Record: 15–17 (7–11 NEC)
- Head coach: Jared Grasso (2nd season)
- Assistant coaches: Brock Erickson; Phil Martelli, Jr.; Chris Cole
- Home arena: Chace Athletic Center

2019–20 Northeast Conference men's basketball standings
	Conf.				Overall
Team	W		L	PCT	W		L	PCT
Merrimack*	14	–	4	.778	20	–	11	.645
Robert Morris †	13	–	5	.722	20	–	14	.588
Saint Francis (PA)	13	–	5	.722	22	–	10	.688
Sacred Heart	12	–	6	.667	20	–	13	.606
LIU	9	–	9	.500	15	–	18	.455
Fairleigh Dickinson	9	–	9	.500	11	–	19	.367
Mount St. Mary's	7	–	11	.389	11	–	21	.344
Bryant	7	–	11	.389	15	–	17	.469
St. Francis Brooklyn	7	–	11	.389	13	–	18	.419
Wagner	5	–	13	.278	8	–	21	.276
Central Connecticut	3	–	15	.167	4	–	27	.129
† 2020 NEC tournament winner * Ineligible for NEC championship (reclassification from Division II)

The 2019–2020 Bryant Bulldogs men's basketball team represented Bryant University during the 2019–20 NCAA Division I men's basketball season. The Bulldogs were led by second-year head coach Jared Grasso, and played their home games at the Chace Athletic Center in Smithfield, Rhode Island as members of the Northeast Conference. They finished the season 15–17, 7–11 in NEC play to finish in a three-way tie for seventh place. They lost in the quarterfinals of the NEC tournament to Saint Francis (PA).

== Previous season ==
The Bulldogs finished the 2018–19 season 10–20, 7–11 in NEC play to finish in eight place. As the No. 8 seed in the NEC tournament, they lost in the quarterfinals to Saint Francis (PA).

== Roster ==
2019–20 Bryant Bulldogs men's basketball team
Players
Coaches

Pos.	#	Name	Height	Weight	Year	Hometown
G	0	Ikenna Ndugba	6 ft 0 in (1.83 m)	185 lb (84 kg)	RS Jr	Boston, Massachusetts
F	1	Juan Cardenas	6 ft 7 in (2.01 m)	200 lb (91 kg)	Sr	Medellín, Colombia
G	2	Ayo Dada	6 ft 2 in (1.88 m)	185 lb (84 kg)	Jr	Houston, Texas
G	3	Michael Green III	5 ft 11 in (1.8 m)	155 lb (70 kg)	Fr	Bronx, New York
F	4	Nathaniel Stokes	6 ft 8 in (2.03 m)	205 lb (93 kg)	Fr	Tacoma, Washington
G	5	Charles Pride	6 ft 4 in (1.93 m)	180 lb (82 kg)	Fr	Syracuse, New York
G	10	Timmy Kiggins	6 ft 0 in (1.83 m)	165 lb (75 kg)	Fr	Westbury, New York
G	11	Adam Grant	6 ft 1 in (1.85 m)	180 lb (82 kg)	Sr	Franklin, Virginia
F	13	Mikail Simmons	6 ft 9 in (2.06 m)	220 lb (100 kg)	Jr	Plano, Texas
G	14	Benson Lin	6 ft 4 in (1.93 m)	180 lb (82 kg)	Fr	New Taipei City, Taiwan
G	21	Tanner Johnson	6 ft 5 in (1.96 m)	205 lb (93 kg)	Sr	Lexington, Kentucky
C	24	Dren Dedushaj	7 ft 2 in (2.18 m)	245 lb (111 kg)	RS So	Brooklyn, New York
F	25	Patrick Harding	6 ft 9 in (2.06 m)	230 lb (104 kg)	So	Fairfield, Connecticut
F	34	Hall Elias	6 ft 7 in (2.01 m)	220 lb (100 kg)	RS Jr	Valley Stream, New York
F	54	Sabastian Townes	6 ft 5 in (1.96 m)	260 lb (118 kg)	Sr	Chesapeake, Virginia

Head coach

- Jared Grasso (Quinnipiac)

Assistant coach(es)

- Brock Erickson (Rhode Island)
- Phil Martelli, Jr. (Saint Joseph's)
- Chris Cole (New Mexico State)

Legend

- (C) Team captain
- (S) Suspended
- (I) Ineligible
- (W) Walk-on
- Injured
- Current redshirt

Roster
Last update: August 29, 2019

== Schedule and results ==
Date time, TV	Rank^{#}	Opponent^{#}	Result	Record	Site (attendance) city, state
Non-conference regular season
November 5, 2019*; 7:00 pm		Brown	L 71-73	0–1	Chace Athletic Center (1,417); Smithfield, RI
November 7, 2019*; 7:00 pm, BTN		at Rutgers; Garden State Showcase	L 71–73	0–2	Louis Brown Athletic Center (5,692); Piscataway, NJ
November 10, 2019*; 1:00 pm		Cornell	W 82–81	1–2	Chace Athletic Center (1,182); Smithfield, RI
November 13, 2019*; 7:00 pm		at Saint Peter's	W 69–44	2–2	Yanitelli Center (728); Jersey City, NJ
November 15, 2019*; 7:00 pm		Northern Vermont-Lyndon; Garden State Showcase	W 116–67	3–2	Chace Athletic Center (654); Smithfield, RI
November 18, 2019*; 7:00 pm		at Niagara; Garden State Showcase	W 73–62	4–2	Gallagher Center (1,251); Lewiston, NY
November 20, 2019*; 7:00 pm		at Drexel; Garden State Showcase	L 74–86	4–3	Daskalakis Athletic Center (882); Philadelphia, PA
November 26, 2019*; 7:00 pm, ESPN3		at New Hampshire	L 76–87	4–4	Lundholm Gym (422); Durham, NH
December 2, 2019*; 7:30 pm		Navy	W 60–45	5–4	Chace Athletic Center (604); Smithfield, RI
December 6, 2019*; 7:00 pm		Columbia	W 67–65	6–4	Chace Athletic Center; Smithfield, RI
December 10, 2019*; 12:00 pm, ESPN+		at Fordham	W 69–61	7–4	Rose Hill Gymnasium (3,200); Bronx, NY
December 21, 2019*; 12:00 pm		at Dartmouth	W 64–60	8–4	Leede Arena (609); Hanover, NH
December 29, 2019*; 12:00 pm, BTN		at No. 13 Maryland	L 70–84	8–5	Xfinity Center (14,777); College Park, MD
Northeast Conference regular season
January 2, 2020; 4:00 pm		Saint Francis (PA)	W 67–63	9–5 (1–0)	Chace Athletic Center (408); Smithfield, RI
January 4, 2020; 1:00 pm		Fairleigh Dickinson	L 73–77	9–6 (1–1)	Chace Athletic Center (860); Smithfield, RI
January 11, 2020; 4:00 pm		Mount St. Mary's	L 65–67	9–7 (1–2)	Chace Athletic Center (1,151); Smithfield, RI
January 15, 2020; 7:00 pm		at Merrimack	L 67–71	9–8 (1–3)	Merrimack Athletics Complex (827); North Andover, MA
January 18, 2020; 4:00 pm		LIU	L 60–74	9–9 (1–4)	Chace Athletic Center (782); Smithfield, RI
January 23, 2020; 7:00 pm		Wagner	W 79–58	10–9 (2–4)	Chace Athletic Center (917); Smithfield, RI
January 25, 2020; 5:00 pm		at Mount St. Mary's	L 76–79	10–10 (2–5)	Knott Arena (3,121); Emmitsburg, MD
January 30, 2020; 7:00 pm		at Robert Morris	L 54–64	10–11 (2–6)	UPMC Events Center (1,513); Moon Township, PA
February 1, 2020; 12:00 pm, CBSSN		at Saint Francis (PA)	L 64–84	10–12 (2–7)	DeGol Arena (1,101); Loretto, PA
February 6, 2020; 7:00 pm		St. Francis Brooklyn	W 73–60	11–12 (3–7)	Chace Athletic Center (758); Smithfield, RI
February 8, 2020; 4:00 pm, ESPN+		Central Connecticut	W 64–60	12–12 (4–7)	Chace Athletic Center (1,662); Smithfield, RI
February 13, 2020; 5:00 pm, CBSSN		at Sacred Heart	L 65–74	12–13 (4–8)	William H. Pitt Center (755); Fairfield, CT
February 15, 2020; 3:30 pm		at Central Connecticut	L 70–75	12–14 (4–9)	William H. Detrick Gymnasium (1,289); New Britain, CT
February 18, 2020; 7:00 pm		Merrimack	W 61–52	13–14 (5–9)	Chace Athletic Center (1,482); Smithfield, RI
February 21, 2020; 7:30 pm		at St. Francis Brooklyn	W 82–74	14–14 (6–9)	Generoso Pope Athletic Complex (1,500); Brooklyn, NY
February 23, 2020; 1:00 pm		Sacred Heart	L 76–83	14–15 (6–10)	Chace Athletic Center (914); Smithfield, RI
February 27, 2020; 7:00 pm		at Fairleigh Dickinson	L 72–74	14–16 (6–11)	Rothman Center (627); Hackensack, NJ
February 29, 2020; 4:00 pm		at Wagner	W 80–59	15–16 (7–11)	Spiro Sports Center (1,614); Staten Island, NY
NEC tournament
March 4, 2020; 7:00 pm, NEC Front Row	(7)	at (2) Saint Francis (PA); Quarterfinals	L 61–87	15–17	DeGol Arena (1,025); Loretto, PA
*Non-conference game. ^{#}Rankings from AP Poll. (#) Tournament seedings in parentheses. All times are in Eastern Time.

Schedule source:
