= 2019–20 LIU Sharks men's basketball team =

American college basketball season

2019–20 LIU Sharks men's basketball
- Conference: Northeast Conference
- Record: 15–18 (9–9 NEC)
- Head coach: Derek Kellogg (3rd season)
- Assistant coaches: Jim Mack (5th season); Marlon Williamson (3rd season); Ralph Auriantal (3rd season)
- Home arena: Steinberg Wellness Center; Barclays Center

2019–20 Northeast Conference men's basketball standings
	Conf.				Overall
Team	W		L	PCT	W		L	PCT
Merrimack*	14	–	4	.778	20	–	11	.645
Robert Morris †	13	–	5	.722	20	–	14	.588
Saint Francis (PA)	13	–	5	.722	22	–	10	.688
Sacred Heart	12	–	6	.667	20	–	13	.606
LIU	9	–	9	.500	15	–	18	.455
Fairleigh Dickinson	9	–	9	.500	11	–	19	.367
Mount St. Mary's	7	–	11	.389	11	–	21	.344
Bryant	7	–	11	.389	15	–	17	.469
St. Francis Brooklyn	7	–	11	.389	13	–	18	.419
Wagner	5	–	13	.278	8	–	21	.276
Central Connecticut	3	–	15	.167	4	–	27	.129
† 2020 NEC tournament winner * Ineligible for NEC championship (reclassification from Division II)

The 2019–20 LIU Sharks men's basketball team represented Long Island University during the 2019–20 NCAA Division I men's basketball season. The Sharks were led by third-year head coach Derek Kellogg, and played their home games at the Steinberg Wellness Center, with some home games at the Barclays Center, as members of the Northeast Conference (NEC).

This was the first season for the LIU Sharks, which is a consolidation of the two athletic programs, the Division I LIU Brooklyn Blackbirds and Division II LIU Post Pioneers.

They finished the season 15–18, 9–9 in NEC play to finish in a tie for fifth place. They defeated Fairleigh Dickinson in the quarterfinals of the NEC tournament before losing in the semifinals to Robert Morris.

== Previous season ==
In the final year as the LIU Brooklyn, the Blackbirds finished the 2018–19 season 16–16 overall, 9–9 in NEC play to finish in a tie for fifth place. As the No. 6 seed in the NEC tournament, they advanced to the semifinals, where they lost to Saint Francis (PA).

== Roster ==
2019–20 LIU Sharks men's basketball team
Players
Coaches

Pos.	#	Name	Height	Weight	Year	Hometown
G	0	Virshon Cotton	6 ft 2 in (1.88 m)	165 lb (75 kg)	RS So	Milwaukee, WI
G	1	Julian Batts	6 ft 0 in (1.83 m)	175 lb (79 kg)	Sr	Pittsburgh, PA
G	3	Jashaun Agosto	6 ft 0 in (1.83 m)	165 lb (75 kg)	Sr	Seattle, WA
F	4	Jack Ballantyne	6 ft 9 in (2.06 m)	240 lb (109 kg)	So	Shelby Township, MI
G	5	Tre Wood	6 ft 1 in (1.85 m)	165 lb (75 kg)	So	Upper Marlboro, MD
G	10	Jermaine Jackson Jr.	5 ft 10 in (1.78 m)	185 lb (84 kg)	So	Shelby Township, MI
F	11	Eral Penn	6 ft 7 in (2.01 m)	185 lb (84 kg)	Jr	Brooklyn, NY
F	12	Brandon Bridgewater	6 ft 0 in (1.83 m)	163 lb (74 kg)	Fr	Brooklyn, NY
F	13	Gankandou Cissé	6 ft 9 in (2.06 m)	215 lb (98 kg)	RS Sr	Dakar, Senegal
G	15	Devin Nicholson	6 ft 2 in (1.88 m)	180 lb (82 kg)	So	Staten Island, NY
C	21	Ousmane Ndim	7 ft 0 in (2.13 m)	235 lb (107 kg)	So	Dakar, Senegal
F	23	Raiquan Clark	6 ft 6 in (1.98 m)	195 lb (88 kg)	RS Sr	New Haven, CT
F	24	Ty Flowers	6 ft 9 in (2.06 m)	200 lb (91 kg)	RS Jr	Waterbury, CT
G	30	Ashtyn Bradley	6 ft 4 in (1.93 m)	185 lb (84 kg)	Sr	Fresno, TX

Head coach

- Derek Kellogg (UMass)

Assistant coach(es)

- Jim Mack (Springfield)
- Marlon Williamson (Youngstown State)
- Ralph Auriantal (St. Francis Brooklyn)

Legend

- (C) Team captain
- (S) Suspended
- (I) Ineligible
- (W) Walk-on
- Injured
- Current redshirt

Roster
Last update: April 17, 2020

== Schedule and results ==
Date time, TV	Rank^{#}	Opponent^{#}	Result	Record	Site (attendance) city, state
Non-conference regular season
November 5, 2019*; 7:00 pm		at Rhode Island	L 65–76	0–1	Ryan Center (4,258); Kingston, RI
November 8, 2019*; 7:00 pm		UMass Lowell	L 74–87	0–2	Steinberg Wellness Center (681); Brooklyn, NY
November 13, 2019*; 7:00 pm		at George Mason	L 74–80	0–3	EagleBank Arena (2,432); Fairfax, VA
November 18, 2019*; 7:00 pm		at Delaware State	W 92–84	1–3	Memorial Hall (840); Dover, DE
November 22, 2019*; 7:00 pm		at San Diego State; Las Vegas Invitational campus site game	L 64–81	1–4	Viejas Arena (10,243); San Diego, CA
November 24, 2019*; 2:00 pm		at No. 12 Texas Tech; Las Vegas Invitational campus site game	L 66–96	1–5	United Supermarkets Arena (13,286); Lubbock, TX
November 28, 2019*; 4:30 pm		vs. North Florida; Las Vegas Invitational	L 92–95	1–6	Orleans Arena; Paradise, NV
November 28, 2019*; 4:30 pm		vs. Cal Poly; Las Vegas Invitational	W 82–69	2–6	Orleans Arena; Paradise, NV
December 7, 2019*; 1:00 pm		at Army	W 85–72	3–6	Christl Arena (532); West Point, NY
December 14, 2019*; 2:00 pm		at Rider	L 74–89	3–7	Alumni Gymnasium (1,231); Lawrenceville, NJ
December 20, 2019*; 2:00 pm		Delaware	W 82–75 ^{OT}	4–7	Steinberg Wellness Center (649); Brooklyn, NY
December 22, 2019*; 12:00 pm		Saint Peter's	L 58–69	4–8	Barclays Center (681); Brooklyn, NY
December 28, 2019*; 4:30 pm		Centenary (NJ)	W 125–84	5–8	Steinberg Wellness Center (313); Brooklyn, NY
Northeast Conference regular season
January 4, 2020; 2:00 pm, CBSSN		at Mount St. Mary's	L 73–82 ^{2OT}	5–9 (0–1)	Knott Arena (1,401); Emmitsburg, MD
January 9, 2020; 7:00 pm		Central Connecticut	W 90–78	6–9 (1–1)	Steinberg Wellness Center (382); Brooklyn, NY
January 11, 2020; 4:30 pm		Fairleigh Dickinson	W 84–70	7–9 (2–1)	Steinberg Wellness Center (538); Brooklyn, NY
January 15, 2020; 7:00 pm, SNY		at St. Francis Brooklyn	W 69–66	8–9 (3–1)	Generoso Pope Athletic Complex (817); Brooklyn, NY
January 18, 2020; 4:00 pm		at Bryant	W 74–60	9–9 (4–1)	Chace Athletic Center (782); Smithfield, RI
January 20, 2020; 4:00 pm		at Wagner	L 64–72	9–10 (4–2)	Spiro Sports Center (1,373); Staten Island, NY
January 23, 2020; 7:00 pm		Saint Francis (PA)	W 86–81	10–10 (5–2)	Steinberg Wellness Center (452); Brooklyn, NY
January 25, 2020; 4:30 pm		Robert Morris	L 66–71	10–11 (5–3)	Steinberg Wellness Center (634); Brooklyn, NY
February 1, 2020; 4:00 pm		at Merrimack	L 59–70	10–12 (5–4)	Hammel Court (1,471); North Andover, MA
February 6, 2020; 7:00 pm		Mount St. Mary's	L 63–67	10–13 (5–5)	Steinberg Wellness Center (418); Brooklyn, NY
February 8, 2020; 4:30 pm		Merrimack	W 67–64 ^{OT}	11–13 (6–5)	Steinberg Wellness Center (826); Brooklyn, NY
February 13, 2020; 7:00 pm		at Central Connecticut	W 90–74	12–13 (7–5)	William H. Detrick Gymnasium (1,032); New Britain, CT
February 15, 2020; 4:30 pm		Sacred Heart	L 72–80	12–14 (7–6)	Steinberg Wellness Center (749); Brooklyn, NY
February 18, 2020; 5:00 pm, ESPNU		St. Francis Brooklyn; Battle of Brooklyn	L 77–87	12–15 (7–7)	Steinberg Wellness Center (1,227); Brooklyn, NY
February 21, 2020; 8:00 pm		at Fairleigh Dickinson	W 86–81	13–15 (8–7)	Rothman Center (712); Hackensack, NJ
February 23, 2020; 4:00 pm		at Saint Francis (PA)	L 71–74	13–16 (8–8)	DeGol Arena (1,628); Loretto, PA
February 27, 2020; 7:00 pm		Wagner	W 74–66	14–16 (9–8)	Steinberg Wellness Center (763); Brooklyn, NY
February 29, 2020; 3:30 pm		at Sacred Heart	L 67–76	14–17 (9–9)	William H. Pitt Center (651); Fairfield, CT
NEC tournament
March 4, 2020; 7:00 pm, NEC Front Row	(4)	(5) Fairleigh Dickinson; Quarterfinals	W 73–72	15–17	Steinberg Wellness Center (1,432); Brooklyn, NY
March 7, 2020; 2:00 pm, ESPN3	(4)	at (1) Robert Morris; Semifinals	L 66-86	15-18	UPMC Events Center (1,342); Moon Township, PA
*Non-conference game. ^{#}Rankings from AP Poll. (#) Tournament seedings in parentheses. All times are in Eastern Time.
