= 2019–20 St. Francis Brooklyn Terriers men's basketball team =

American college basketball season

2019–20 St. Francis Brooklyn Terriers men's basketball
- Conference: Northeast Conference
- Record: 13–18 (7–11 NEC)
- Head coach: Glenn Braica (10th season)
- Associate head coach: Clive Bentick (1st season, 13th overall season)
- Assistant coaches: Ron Ganulin (7th season); Jamaal Womack (7th season)
- Home arena: Generoso Pope Athletic Complex

2019–20 Northeast Conference men's basketball standings
	Conf.				Overall
Team	W		L	PCT	W		L	PCT
Merrimack*	14	–	4	.778	20	–	11	.645
Robert Morris †	13	–	5	.722	20	–	14	.588
Saint Francis (PA)	13	–	5	.722	22	–	10	.688
Sacred Heart	12	–	6	.667	20	–	13	.606
LIU	9	–	9	.500	15	–	18	.455
Fairleigh Dickinson	9	–	9	.500	11	–	19	.367
Mount St. Mary's	7	–	11	.389	11	–	21	.344
Bryant	7	–	11	.389	15	–	17	.469
St. Francis Brooklyn	7	–	11	.389	13	–	18	.419
Wagner	5	–	13	.278	8	–	21	.276
Central Connecticut	3	–	15	.167	4	–	27	.129
† 2020 NEC tournament winner * Ineligible for NEC championship (reclassification from Division II)

The 2019–20 St. Francis Brooklyn Terriers men's basketball team represented St. Francis College during the 2019–20 NCAA Division I men's basketball season. The team's head coach was Glenn Braica, who was in his 10th season as the head men's basketball coach. The Terriers played their home games at the Generoso Pope Athletic Complex in Brooklyn Heights, New York as members of the Northeast Conference. They finished the season 13–18, 7–11 in NEC play to finish in a three-way tie for seventh place. They lost in the quarterfinals of the NEC tournament to Robert Morris.

== Previous season ==
The Terriers finished the 2018–19 season 17–16, 9–9 in NEC play. The Terriers proceeded to lose in the first round of the NEC tournament to Robert Morris in overtime. After the NEC Tournament the Terriers were invited to the 2019 CollegeInsider.com Postseason Tournament. They lost in the first round to Hampton.

== Offseason ==
=== Departures ===
Name	Number	Pos.	Height	Weight	Year	Hometown	Notes
Glenn Sanabria	10	G	5' 11"	180	RS-Senior	Staten Island, NY	Graduated
Keon Williams	13	F	6' 4"	185	RS-Senior	Atlanta, GA	Graduated
Jalen Jordan	14	G	6' 3"	160	Junior	Conyers, GA	Transferred to Middle Tennessee

=== Class of 2019 signees ===
College recruiting information
Name	Hometown	School	Height	Weight	Commit date
Trey Quartlebaum; PG	Lawrence, Kansas	Lawrence High School	6 ft 1 in (1.85 m)	170 lb (77 kg)	November 16, 2018
Trey Quartlebaum; PG	Recruit ratings: No ratings found				
Rob Higgins; PG	Middletown, New Jersey	Middletown High School North	6 ft 1 in (1.85 m)	175 lb (79 kg)	May 8, 2019
Rob Higgins; PG	Recruit ratings: No ratings found				
Overall recruit ranking:
Note: In many cases, Scout, Rivals, 247Sports, On3, and ESPN may conflict in their listings of height and weight.; In these cases, the average was taken. ESPN grades are on a 100-point scale.; Sources: "2019 St. Francis Brooklyn Signees". Rivals.; "2019 St. Francis Brooklyn Signees". Scout.; "2019 St. Francis Brooklyn Signees". ESPN.; "Scout.com Team Recruiting Rankings". Scout.; "2019 Team Ranking". Rivals.; "2019 St. Francis Brooklyn Signees". 247Sports.

=== Incoming transfers ===
Name	Number	Pos.	Height	Weight	Year	Hometown	Previous School
Unique McLean	14	SG	6' 2"	175	Graduate/RS-Jr	Brooklyn, New York	Graduated from UMass with 2 years of eligibility.

== Roster ==
2019–20 St. Francis Brooklyn Terriers men's basketball team
Players
Coaches

Pos.	#	Name	Height	Weight	Year	Previous school	Hometown
F	11	Joshua Nurse	6 ft 9 in (2.06 m)	210 lb (95 kg)	RS Sr	Queens High School of Teaching	Laurelton, New York
F	21	Milija Čosić	6 ft 6 in (1.98 m)	220 lb (100 kg)	RS Sr	Frank Phillips College	Belgrade, Serbia
C	20	Cori Johnson	6 ft 9 in (2.06 m)	270 lb (122 kg)	RS Sr	South Shore High School	Brooklyn, NY
G	2	Rosel Hurley	6 ft 5 in (1.96 m)	191 lb (87 kg)	Sr	Shaker Heights High School	Cleveland, OH
F	33	Deniz Celen	6 ft 8 in (2.03 m)	234 lb (106 kg)	Sr	Harcum College	Ankara, Turkey
C	41	Christian Rohlehr	6 ft 9 in (2.06 m)	228 lb (103 kg)	Sr	Notre Dame High School; Jefferson CC (NY)	Ajax, ON, Canada
G	14	Unique McLean	6 ft 2 in (1.88 m)	175 lb (79 kg)	RS Jr	UMass	Brooklyn, New York
G	4	Chauncey Hawkins	5 ft 8 in (1.73 m)	140 lb (64 kg)	Jr	Saint Joseph Regional High School	Spring Valley, NY
F	5	Yaradyah Evans	6 ft 6 in (1.98 m)	190 lb (86 kg)	RS Jr	South Shore High School	Brooklyn, NY
G	45	Jordan Williams	6 ft 4 in (1.93 m)	185 lb (84 kg)	Jr	St. Edmund Prep	Brooklyn, NY
G	1	Stevan Krtinić	6 ft 5 in (1.96 m)	193 lb (88 kg)	So	Carnegie Schools Riverside	Novi Sad, Serbia
G	0	Larry Moreno	5 ft 11 in (1.8 m)	148 lb (67 kg)	RS Fr	Brooklyn High School For Law & Technology	Brooklyn, NY
G	15	Trey Quartlebaum	6 ft 1 in (1.85 m)	170 lb (77 kg)	Fr	Lawrence High School	Lawrence, KS
G	3	Rob Higgins	6 ft 1 in (1.85 m)	175 lb (79 kg)	Fr	Middletown High School North	Middletown, NJ
G	30	Alex May (W)	6 ft 1 in (1.85 m)	170 lb (77 kg)	Fr	Andrews Osborne Academy	Englewood, NJ

Head coach

- Glenn Braica (Queens College '89)

Assistant coach(es)

- Clive Bentick (Canisius '01)
- Ron Ganulin (LIU '68)
- Jamaal Womack (St. Francis '09)

Legend

- (C) Team captain
- (S) Suspended
- (I) Ineligible
- (W) Walk-on
- Injured
- Current redshirt

Roster
Last update: September 13, 2019

== Regular season ==
=== Non-conference games ===
The Terriers finished non-conference play at 6–6. Their most striking statistic was their 5–0 record at home and 1–6 record on the road, their lone road win came against Hartford. Since the start of the 2017–18 season, the Terriers have produced a 27-6 record at home (as of December 23, 2019). Their largest margin of victory was against Division III opponent Medgar Evers, 122–58. Against a Division I opponent the largest margin was 81–61 versus Delaware State. The Terriers largest margin of defeat was 31 points, which occurred twice, first at NC State then at UMass Lowell. The Terriers ended their non-conference portion of the schedule with a three-game win streak.

=== Conference games ===
In their first NEC game, the Terriers extended their win streak to 4 games and improved to 6–0 at home against reigning NEC champions, Fairleigh Dickinson. The Terriers proceeded to lose two consecutive games on their western Pennsylvania road trip: they were blown out by Robert Morris, and then lost a close game against Saint Francis (PA) in the final second, 80–81. The Terriers losing streak extended to three games after losing another close game to LIU, 66–69, which was televised on SNY. The loss to LIU also ended the Terriers 6-game home win streak for the season. The Terriers then snapped their 3-game losing streak by defeating the Wagner Seahawks behind exceptional performances by Chauncey Hawkins (20 pts, 3 ast, 4 stl) and Unique McLean (18 pts, 12 reb, 3 ast, 2 stl, 2 blk). The Terriers then traveled to Mount St. Mary's and were stifled by the Mountaineers defense, losing 39–59, a season low in points for the Terriers. The Terriers next hosted then NEC leading Robert Morris and upset the Colonials, 78–57. Five Terriers scored more than ten points, and McLean recorded his fourth double-double of the season. St. Francis Brooklyn leveled their season (10–10) and conference (4–4) records by defeating Saint Francis (PA) 86–79 at home. In the game, Deniz Celen (22 pts) and Chauncey Hawkins (21 pts) led the Terriers in scoring.

In their next 10 games, the Terriers produced a 3-7 record, nonetheless they were in a three-way tie for 6th place. Due to NEC tiebreaker rules, the Terriers had the 8th seed heading into the NEC Tournament. At the end of their conference schedule it was announced that Deniz Celen and Chauncey Hawkins were selected Third Team All-Conference, and Rob Higgins was selected to the All-Rookie Team.

== Schedule and results ==
Date time, TV	Rank^{#}	Opponent^{#}	Result	Record	High points	High rebounds	High assists	Site (attendance) city, state
Non-conference regular season
November 5, 2019*; 9:30 pm, ESPN+		at Fordham	L 59–68	0–1	13 – McLean	8 – McLean	3 – 3 tied	Rose Hill Gymnasium (3,200); Bronx, NY
November 9, 2019*; 2:00 pm		Lafayette	W 73–72	1–1	24 – Hawkins	10 – McLean	3 – Krtinic	Generoso Pope Athletic Complex (528); Brooklyn, NY
November 14, 2019*; 6:00 pm		at Longwood	L 77–86	1–2	13 – 3 tied	7 – McLean, Hurley	4 – Hawkins	Willett Hall (1,250); Farmville, VA
November 16, 2019*; 12:00 pm, ACCN		at NC State; Barclays Center Classic	L 64–95	1–3	16 – Hawkins	8 – Hawkins, Evans	3 – Higgins	PNC Arena (4,774); Raleigh, NC
November 21, 2019*; 7:00 pm		Medgar Evers	W 122–58	2–3	20 – Quartlebaum	13 – Evans	5 – Krtinic	Generoso Pope Athletic Complex (504); Brooklyn, NY
November 26, 2019*; 7:30 pm		at Little Rock; Barclays Center Classic	L 56–67	2–4	13 – McLean	7 – McLean, Celen	2 – 3 tied	Jack Stephens Center (783); Little Rock, AR
November 30, 2019*; 1:00 pm, ESPN+		at Saint Peter's	L 59–67	2–5	21 – Celen	8 – Evans	2 – 3 tied	Yanitelli Center (569); Jersey City, NJ
December 5, 2019*; 7:00 pm, ESPN+		at Hartford	W 84–78	3–5	23 – Hawkins	10 – Celen	4 – Hawkins, Celen	Chase Arena at Reich Family Pavilion (577); Hartford, CT
December 7, 2019*; 1:00 pm		at UMass Lowell	L 63–94	3–6	15 – Celen	8 – Celen	4 – Krtinic	Tsongas Center (443); Lowell, MA
December 10, 2019*; 3:00 pm		Presbyterian	W 64–63	4–6	19 – McLean	8 – McLean	2 – 3 tied	Generoso Pope Athletic Complex (264); Brooklyn, NY
December 14, 2019*; 2:00 pm		NJIT	W 73–71	5–6	21 – Hawkins	9 – Hurley	3 – Higgins	Generoso Pope Athletic Complex (418); Brooklyn, NY
December 22, 2019*; 2:00 pm		Delaware State	W 81–62	6–6	27 – Celen	11 – Celen	4 – Hawkins	Generoso Pope Athletic Complex (513); Brooklyn, NY
Northeast Conference Regular Season
January 2, 2020; 7:30 pm		Fairleigh Dickinson	W 79–63	7–6 (1–0)	16 – Hawkins	10 – McLean	5 – Hawkins	Generoso Pope Athletic Complex (464); Brooklyn, NY
January 9, 2020; 7:00 pm		at Robert Morris	L 52–78	7–7 (1–1)	11 – Higgins, McLean	7 – McLean	2 – 3 tied	UPMC Events Center (611); Moon Township, PA
January 11, 2020; 7:00 pm		at Saint Francis (PA)	L 80–81	7–8 (1–2)	16 – Hawkins	7 – McLean	5 – Hawkins	DeGol Arena (1,327); Loretto, PA
January 15, 2020; 7:00 pm, SNY		LIU	L 66–69	7–9 (1–3)	20 – Celen; Higgins	13 – McLean	6 – Hawkins, McLean	Generoso Pope Athletic Complex (817); Brooklyn, NY
January 18, 2020; 4:00 pm		at Wagner	W 69–64	8–9 (2–3)	20 – Hawkins	12 – McLean	3 – 3 tied	Spiro Sports Center (1,127); Staten Island, NY
January 20, 2020; 7:00 pm		at Mount St. Mary's	L 39–59	8–10 (2–4)	13 – Higgins	10 – McLean	4 – Hawkins	Knott Arena (1,726); Emmitsburg, MD
January 23, 2020; 7:00 pm		Robert Morris	W 78–57	9–10 (3–4)	15 – Hawkins, Celen	10 – McLean	5 – Hawkins	Generoso Pope Athletic Complex (676); Brooklyn, NY
January 25, 2020; 4:00 pm		Saint Francis (PA)	W 86–79	10–10 (4–4)	22 – Celen	7 – Celen, McLean	4 – Hawkins	Generoso Pope Athletic Complex (598); Brooklyn, NY
January 30, 2020; 7:00 pm		at Merrimack	L 50–61	10–11 (4–5)	13 – Krtinic	12 – McLean	3 – Hawkins, Higgins	Merrimack Athletics Complex (984); North Andover, MA
February 1, 2020; 4:00 pm		Sacred Heart	L 76–83	10–12 (4–6)	17 – Celen	8 – McLean	7 – Hawkins	Generoso Pope Athletic Complex (428); Brooklyn, NY
February 6, 2020; 7:00 pm		at Bryant	L 60–79	10–13 (4–7)	15 – McLean	6 – Rohlehr	7 – Higgins	Chace Athletic Center (758); Smithfield, RI
February 8, 2020; 4:00 pm		Mount St. Mary's	W 70–67	11–13 (5–7)	21 – McLean	7 – Hawkins, Evans	4 – Hawkins, McLean	Generoso Pope Athletic Complex (607); Brooklyn, NY
February 13, 2020; 7:00 pm		Merrimack	L 50–60	11–14 (5–8)	15 – McLean	13 – McLean	5 – Celen	Generoso Pope Athletic Complex (608); Brooklyn, NY
February 18, 2020; 5:00 pm, ESPNU		at LIU; Battle of Brooklyn	W 87–77	12–14 (6–8)	19 – Higgins	12 – McLean	5 – Hawkins	Steinberg Wellness Center (1,227); Brooklyn, NY
February 21, 2020; 7:30 pm		Bryant	L 74–82	12–15 (6–9)	27 – Hawkins	7 – Rohlehr	2 – 3 tied	Generoso Pope Athletic Complex (488); Brooklyn, NY
February 23, 2020; 4:00 pm		Wagner	L 71–75 ^{OT}	12–16 (6–10)	22 – Hawkins	12 – Celen	6 – Hawkins	Generoso Pope Athletic Complex (513); Brooklyn, NY
February 27, 2020; 7:00 pm		at Sacred Heart	L 63–73	12–17 (6–11)	16 – Hawkins	11 – McLean	4 – Hawkins	William H. Pitt Center (331); Fairfield, CT
February 29, 2020; 1:00 pm		at Central Connecticut	W 85–79	13–17 (7–11)	38 – Hawkins	12 – McLean	4 – McLean	William H. Detrick Gymnasium (1,372); New Britain, CT
Northeast Conference tournament
March 4, 2020; 7:00 pm, ESPN+	(8)	at (1) Robert Morris; Quarterfinals	L 58–59	13–18	23 – Hawkins	8 – Celen	2 – Hawkins	UPMC Events Center (659); Moon Township, PA
*Non-conference game. ^{#}Rankings from AP Poll. (#) Tournament seedings in parentheses. All times are in Eastern Time..

== Awards ==
- Deniz Celen

1x NEC Player of the Week
Selected Northeast Conference Men’s Basketball Third Team All-Conference

- Chauncey Hawkins

1x NEC Player of the Week
1x College Sports Madness NEC Player of the Week
Selected Northeast Conference Men’s Basketball Third Team All-Conference

- Rob Higgins

1x NEC Rookie of the Week
Selected to the Northeast Conference Men’s Basketball All-Rookie Team

- Larry Moreno

1x NEC Rookie of the Week

== See also ==
- 2019–20 St. Francis Brooklyn Terriers women's basketball team
