= 2019–20 Northeast Conference men's basketball season =

- League: NCAA Division I
- Sport: Basketball
- Number of teams: 11
- TV partner(s): NEC Front Row, ESPN2, MSG, FCS, Regional Sports Networks

NBA Draft

Regular season
- First place: Merrimack
- Season MVP: Isaiah Blackmon (SFPA)
- Top scorer: Raiquan Clark (LIU)

NEC tournament
- Champions: Robert Morris
- Runners-up: Saint Francis (PA)
- Finals MVP: Dante Treacy (RMU)

Northeast Conference men's basketball seasons
- ← 2018–19 2020–21 →

2019–20 Northeast Conference men's basketball standings
	Conf.				Overall
Team	W		L	PCT	W		L	PCT
Merrimack*	14	–	4	.778	20	–	11	.645
Robert Morris †	13	–	5	.722	20	–	14	.588
Saint Francis (PA)	13	–	5	.722	22	–	10	.688
Sacred Heart	12	–	6	.667	20	–	13	.606
LIU	9	–	9	.500	15	–	18	.455
Fairleigh Dickinson	9	–	9	.500	11	–	19	.367
Mount St. Mary's	7	–	11	.389	11	–	21	.344
Bryant	7	–	11	.389	15	–	17	.469
St. Francis Brooklyn	7	–	11	.389	13	–	18	.419
Wagner	5	–	13	.278	8	–	21	.276
Central Connecticut	3	–	15	.167	4	–	27	.129
† 2020 NEC tournament winner * Ineligible for NEC championship (reclassification from Division II)

The 2019–20 Northeast Conference men's basketball season began with practices in October 2019, followed by the start of the 2019–20 NCAA Division I men's basketball season in November. Conference play started in January and ended in February 2020.

The NEC tournament was held in March with the higher-seeded team hosting each game. The quarterfinals were played on March 4, the semifinals on March 7, and the championship game on March 10.

== Changes from last season ==
Merrimack College joined the Northeast Conference from Division II Northeast-10 Conference. They are not eligible this year for the NEC tournament.

On October 3, 2018 Long Island University announced that it would combine its two existing athletic programs—NEC member LIU Brooklyn and the Division II program at LIU Post—into a single Division I program under the LIU name. The new LIU program, nicknamed Sharks, maintained LIU Brooklyn's existing memberships in Division I and the NEC.

== Head coaches ==
Team	Head coach	Previous position	Year at school	Overall record	NEC record	NEC tournament championships
Bryant	Jared Grasso	Iona (asst.)	2	10–20	7–11	0
Central Connecticut	Donyell Marshall	Buffalo (asst.)	4	31–61	16–38	0
Fairleigh Dickinson	Greg Herenda	UMass Lowell	7	81–108	50–56	2
LIU	Derek Kellogg	UMass	3	34–33	19–17	1
Merrimack	Joe Gallo	Robert Morris (asst.)	4	61–34	0–0	0
Mount St. Mary's	Dan Engelstad	Southern Vermont	2	9–22	6–12	0
Robert Morris	Andrew Toole	Robert Morris (asst.)	10	168–140	102–58	1
Sacred Heart	Anthony Latina	Sacred Heart (asst.)	7	70–118	46–60	0
St. Francis Brooklyn	Glenn Braica	St. John's (asst.)	10	132–152	86–74	0
Saint Francis (PA)	Rob Krimmel	Saint Francis (asst.)	8	97–123	65–59	0
Wagner	Bashir Mason	Wagner (asst.)	8	123–96	78–46	0

Notes:

- All records, appearances, titles, etc. are from time with current school only.
- Year at school includes 2019–20 season.
- Overall and NEC/NCAA records are from time at current school and are before the beginning of the 2019–20 season. Because the current LIU athletic program inherited the athletic history of LIU Brooklyn, Kellogg's record includes his two seasons at LIU Brooklyn before the LIU athletic merger.
- Previous jobs are head coaching jobs unless otherwise noted.

== Preseason ==
=== Preseason coaches poll ===
Rank	Team
1.	LIU (5)
2.	Sacred Heart (3)
3.	Saint Francis (PA) (1)
4.	Fairleigh Dickinson (2)
5.	Robert Morris
6.	Bryant
7.	Mount St. Mary's
8.	St. Francis Brooklyn
9.	Wagner
10.	Central Connecticut
11.	Merrimack

() first place votes

=== Preseason All-NEC team ===
Recipient	School
Keith Braxton, (Senior, Guard)	Saint Francis (PA)
Raiquan Clark, (R-Senior, Swingman)	LIU
E.J. Anosike, (Junior, Swingman)	Sacred Heart
Adam Grant, (Senior, Guard)	Bryant
Jahlil Jenkins, (Junior, Guard)	Fairleigh Dickinson

== NEC regular season ==
=== Player of the week ===
Throughout the regular season, the Northeast Conference offices named player(s) of the week and rookie(s) of the week.

Week	Player of the week	Rookie of the week
November 11, 2019	Juvaris Hayes, MC	Charles Pride, BRY
November 18, 2019	Keith Braxton, SFPA	Jordan Minor, MC
November 25, 2019	E.J. Anosike, SHU	Charles Pride (2), BRY
December 2, 2019	Raiquan Clark, LIU	Greg Outlaw, CCSU
December 9, 2019	E.J. Anosike (2), SHU; Jermaine Jackson Jr., LIU	Benson Lin, BRY
December 16, 2019	Chauncey Hawkins, SFBK	Benson Lin (2), BRY
December 23, 2019	E.J. Anosike (3), SHU; Deniz Celen, SFBK	Tyler Thomas, SHU
December 30, 2019	Jalen Gibbs, MSM	Jordan Minor (2), MC
January 6, 2020	Isaiah Blackmon, SFPA	Tyler Thomas (2), SHU
January 13, 2020	Josh Williams, RMU	Mykel Derring, MC
January 22, 2020	A.J. Bramah, RMU	Rob Higgins, SFBK; Benson Lin (3), BRY
January 27, 2020	Jaleel Lord, MC	Charles Pride (3), BRY
February 3, 2020	Juvaris Hayes (2), MC	Devon Dunn, FDU
February 10, 2020	Keith Braxton (2), SFU; Ty Flowers, LIU	Larry Moreno, SFBK
February 17, 2020	E.J. Anosike (4), SHU; Jahlil Jenkins, FDU	Larry Green III, BRY
February 25, 2020	Isaiah Blackmon (2), SFU	Larry Green III (2), BRY
March 2, 2020	E.J. Anosike (5), SHU; Keith Braxton (3), SFU	Charles Pride (4), BRY

School	Player of the week Awards	Rookie of the week Awards
Bryant	0	9
Central Connecticut	0	1
Fairleigh Dickinson	1	1
LIU	3	0
Merrimack	3	3
Mount St. Mary's	1	0
Robert Morris	2	0
Sacred Heart	5	2
St. Francis Brooklyn	2	2
Saint Francis (PA)	5	0
Wagner	0	0

=== Against other conferences ===
Conference newcomer Merrimack produced the biggest upset of the season for an NEC team when they defeated the Northwestern Wildcats, 71–61. For Merrimack, it was just their second Division I game since moving up from Division II this past season. It was the lone victory for an NEC team against a Power Five conference team; NEC teams produced a 1–15 overall record against that group of schools.

**NEC versus other Division I conferences**
Conference	Outcome
America East Conference	6–13
American Athletic Conference	0–1
**Atlantic Coast Conference**	0–6
Atlantic Sun Conference	**3–2**
Atlantic 10 Conference	2–9
Big East Conference	0–9
Big South Conference	**2–1**
**Big Ten Conference**	1–4
Big West Conference	1–1

**NEC versus other Division I conferences**
Conference	Outcome
**Big 12 Conference**	0–1
Colonial Athletic Association	2–2
Conference USA	0–2
Horizon League	0–3
Ivy League	4–6
Metro Atlantic Athletic Conference	5–5
Mid-American Conference	1–2
Mid-Eastern Athletic Conference	**6–0**
Mountain West Conference	0–2

**NEC versus other Division I conferences**
Conference	Outcome
**Pac-12 Conference**	0–2
Patriot League	**8–7**
**Southeastern Conference**	0–2
Southland Conference	0–1
Sun Belt Conference	0–1
Western Athletic Conference	1–1
**Total**	42–83 (.336)
As of December 29, 2019; In bold are the Power Five conferences.

=== Conference matrix ===
This table summarizes the head-to-head results between teams in conference play.

	Bryant	Central Conn.	Fairleigh Dickinson	LIU	Merrimack	Mount St. Mary's	Robert Morris	Sacred Heart	St. Francis Brooklyn	Saint Francis (PA)	Wagner
vs. Bryant	–	1–1	2–0	1–0	1–1	2–0	1–0	2–0	0–2	1–1	0–2
vs. Central Conn.	1–1	–	1–1	2–0	2–0	1–0	2–0	2–0	1–0	2–0	1–1
vs. Fairleigh Dickinson	0–2	1–1	–	2–0	2–0	0–2	0–2	2–0	1–0	1–0	0–2
vs. LIU	0–1	0–2	0–2	–	1–1	2–0	1–0	2–0	1–1	1–1	1–1
vs. Merrimack	1–1	0–2	0–2	1–1	–	1–1	1–1	0–2	0–2	0–1	0–1
vs. Mount St. Mary's	0–2	0–1	2–0	0–2	1–1	–	2–0	1–0	1–1	2–0	2–0
vs. Robert Morris	0–1	0–2	2–0	0–1	1–1	0–2	–	0–2	1–1	1–1	0–2
vs. Sacred Heart	0–2	0–2	0–2	0–2	2–0	0–1	2–0	–	0–2	2–0	0–1
vs. St. Francis Brooklyn	2–0	0–1	0–1	1–1	2–0	1–1	1–1	2–0	–	1–1	1–1
vs. Saint Francis (PA)	1–1	0–2	0–1	1–1	1–0	0–2	1–1	0–2	1–1	–	0–2
vs. Wagner	2–0	1–1	2–0	1–1	1–0	0–2	2–0	1–0	1–1	2–0	–
Total	7–11	3–15	9–9	9–9	14–4	7–11	13–5	12–6	7–11	13–5	5–13

=== All-NEC honors and awards ===
At the conclusion of the regular season, the conference selects outstanding performers based on a poll of league coaches, below are the results.

Honor	Recipient
Player of the Year	Isaiah Blackmon, SFPA
Coach of the Year	Joe Gallo, MER
Defensive Player of the Year	Juvaris Hayes, MER
Rookie of the Year	Michael Green III, BRY
Most Improved Player of the Year	Damian Chong Qui, MSM
All-NEC First Team	Keith Braxton, SFPA
All-NEC First Team	Raiquan Clark, LIU
All-NEC First Team	E.J. Anosike, SHU
All-NEC First Team	Juvaris Hayes, MER
All-NEC First Team	Isaiah Blackmon, SFPA

Honor	Recipient
All-NEC Second Team	AJ Bramah, RMU
All-NEC Second Team	Ty Flowers, LIU
All-NEC Second Team	Adam Grant, BRY
All-NEC Second Team	Jahlil Jenkins, FDU
All-NEC Second Team	Josh Williams, RMU
All-NEC Third Team	Chauncey Hawkins, SFBK
All-NEC Third Team	Deniz Celen, SFBK
All-NEC Third Team	Kaleb Bishop, FDU
All-NEC Third Team	Damian Chong Qui, MSM
All-NEC Third Team	Koreem Ozier, SHU
All-NEC Rookie Team	Rob Higgins, SFBK
All-NEC Rookie Team	Benson Lin, BRY
All-NEC Rookie Team	Michael Green III, BRY
All-NEC Rookie Team	Devon Dunn, FDU
All-NEC Rookie Team	Myles Baker, CCSU

== Postseason ==
=== NEC tournament ===
The NEC tournament features the top eight eligible teams from the field of eleven participate. The teams are seeded according to their conference records, and when there are similar records between teams, tie-breakers are applied. After the first round, teams are reseeded after each round, with highest remaining seeds receiving home court advantage.

Regular-season champion Merrimack was ineligible under NEC rules as a transitional D-I school. #1 Seed Robert Morris won the NEC tournament for a NEC record 9th time.

Quarterfinals; Wednesday, March 4, 2020; NEC Front Row
1	Robert Morris	59
8	St. Francis (NY)	58
4	LIU	73
5	Fairleigh Dickinson	72
(Pairings are reseeded after the first round)
3	Sacred Heart	61
6	Mount St. Mary's	59
2	St. Francis (PA)	87
7	Bryant	61

Semifinals; Saturday, March 7, 2020; ESPN3
1	Robert Morris	86
4	LIU	66
3	Sacred Heart	72
2	St. Francis (PA)	84

Championship; Tuesday, March 10, 2020; ESPN2
1	Robert Morris	77
2	St. Francis (PA)	67

=== NCAA tournament ===
Seed	Region	School	First Four	1st round	2nd round	Sweet 16	Elite Eight	Final Four	Championship
		Robert Morris							

== See also ==
- 2019–20 Northeast Conference women's basketball season
