= 2022–23 Ivy League men's basketball season =

- League: NCAA Division I
- Sport: Basketball
- Teams: 8
- TV partner: Ivy League Digital Network

Regular season
- Champions: Princeton
- Season MVP: Jordan Dingle, Penn

2023 Ivy League men's basketball tournament
- Champions: Princeton
- Runners-up: Yale

Basketball seasons
- ← 2021–22 2023–24 →

2022–23 Ivy League men's basketball standings
	Conf.				Overall
Team	W		L	PCT	W		L	PCT
Yale	10	–	4	.714	21	–	9	.700
Princeton †	10	–	4	.714	23	–	9	.719
Penn	9	–	5	.643	17	–	13	.567
Cornell	7	–	7	.500	17	–	11	.607
Brown	7	–	7	.500	14	–	13	.519
Dartmouth	6	–	8	.429	10	–	18	.357
Harvard	5	–	9	.357	14	–	14	.500
Columbia	2	–	12	.143	7	–	22	.241
† 2023 Ivy League tournament winner

The 2022–23 Ivy League men's basketball season marked the continuation of the annual tradition of competitive basketball among Ivy League members. The tradition began when the league was formed during the 1956–57 season and its history extends to the predecessor Eastern Intercollegiate Basketball League, which was formed in 1902.

Princeton and Yale co-earned the league title after finishing the regular season 10–4 within the Ivy League. Princeton earned the league's bid to the 2023 NCAA Division I men's basketball tournament after defeating Penn, 77–70, in the semifinals and Yale, 74–65, in the finals of the conference tournament.

Jordan Dingle of Penn was named Ivy League Men's Basketball Player of the Year.

== All-Ivy Teams ==
First Team All-Ivy
	School	Class	Position
Jordan Dingle*	Penn	Junior	Guard
Chris Ledlum*	Harvard	Senior	Forward
Tosan Evbuomwan*	Princeton	Senior	Forward
Matt Knowling*	Yale	Junior	Forward
Kino Lilly*	Brown	Sophomore	Guard

*Unanimous

Second Team All-Ivy
	School	Class	Position
Paxson Wojcik	Brown	Senior	Guard
Greg Dolan	Cornell	Senior	Guard
Dame Adelekun	Dartmouth	Senior	Forward
Matt Allocco	Princeton	Junior	Guard
EJ Jarvis	Yale	Senior	Forward

== NCAA tournament ==
Seed	Region	School	First Four	Round of 64	Round of 32	Sweet 16	Elite Eight	Final Four	Championship
13	West	Princeton	n/a	Defeated Arizona, 59–55	Defeated Missouri, 78–63	Eliminated by Creighton, 86–75			
		W–L (%):	0–0 –	1–0 1.000	1–0 1.000	0–1 .000	0–0 –	0–0 –	0–0 –Total:2-1 .667
