= Isiaih Mosley =

American basketball player (born 2000)

No. 32 – KB Bora
- Position: Shooting guard
- League: Kosovo Superleague

Personal information
- Born: May 3, 2000 (age 26) Macon, Missouri, U.S.
- Listed height: 6 ft 5 in (1.96 m)
- Listed weight: 194 lb (88 kg)

Career information
- High school: Rock Bridge (Columbia, Missouri)
- College: Missouri State (2019–2022); Missouri (2022–2023)
- NBA draft: 2023: undrafted
- Playing career: 2023–present

Career history
- 2023: Greensboro Swarm
- 2023–2024: Wisconsin Herd
- 2024: Rip City Remix
- 2024–present: Bora

Career highlights
- 2× First-team All-MVC (2021, 2022); Mr. Show-Me Basketball (2019)

Isiaih Latrell Mosley (born May 3, 2000) is an American basketball player for Bora of the Kosovo Superleague. He played college basketball for the Missouri Tigers and Missouri State Bears.

== High school career ==
Mosley attended Rock Bridge High School in Columbia, Missouri. As a senior, he averaged 23.2 points and 6.9 rebounds per game, leading his team to the Class 5 state championship, its first-ever state title. He was named Mr. Show-Me Basketball as the top high school player in Missouri. Mosley competed for MOKAN Elite on the Amateur Athletic Union circuit. He committed to playing college basketball for Missouri State over offers from Bradley, Mississippi State, Missouri and SMU. He joined the team with his high school teammate Ja'Monta Black.

== College career ==
On January 18, 2020, Mosley had a freshman season-high 23 points and eight rebounds in a 68–58 win over Evansville. As a freshman, he averaged 8.3 points and 3.6 rebounds per game. On January 3, 2021, Mosley scored 29 points, including 23 in the second half, in a 77–60 win over Indiana State. He became the first Missouri State player to score 20-plus points in five straight games since Johnny Murdock in 1995. In his next game, on January 9, Mosley recorded 29 points, eight rebounds and five assists in an 81–68 victory over Valparaiso. As a sophomore, he averaged 19.8 points, 6.3 rebounds and 3.1 assists per game. Mosley was named to the First Team All-Missouri Valley Conference as well as conference Most Improved Player. On January 8, 2022, he scored a career-high 43 points in a 85–84 loss to Northern Iowa. On January 22, Mosley scored 40 points in a 79–69 upset of Loyola–Chicago. He repeated on the First Team All-Missouri Valley Conference as a junior. For the season, Mosley averaged 20.4 points, 6.2 rebounds, and 2.3 assists per game. On April 6, 2022, he declared for the 2022 NBA draft while maintaining his college eligibility. He withdrew from the NBA draft on May 28, 2022, officially returning to college for his senior season. He visited Mississippi State, and also received interest from Kansas, Kansas State, and Texas Tech. On June 6, 2022, Mosley announced on his Instagram page that he had committed to transfer to Missouri, headlining the first recruiting class for new coach Dennis Gates.

== Professional career ==
=== Greensboro Swarm (2023) ===
On October 29, 2023, Mosley was drafted in the first round of the 2023 NBA G League draft by the Greensboro Swarm.

=== Wisconsin Herd (2023–2024) ===
On December 8, 2023, Mosley was traded to the Wisconsin Herd. However, he was waived on February 2, 2024. On February 5, he joined the Windy City Bulls, but was waived the next day.

=== Rip City Remix (2024) ===
On March 18, 2024, Mosley joined the Rip City Remix.

=== KB Bora (2024–present) ===
On August 8, 2024, Mosley signed with KB Bora of the Kosovo Superleague.

== Career statistics ==
Legend
GP	Games played	GS	Games started	MPG	Minutes per game
FG%	Field goal percentage	3P%	3-point field goal percentage	FT%	Free throw percentage
RPG	Rebounds per game	APG	Assists per game	SPG	Steals per game
BPG	Blocks per game	PPG	Points per game	**Bold**	Career high

=== College ===
Year	Team	GP	GS	MPG	FG%	3P%	FT%	RPG	APG	SPG	BPG	PPG
2019–20	Missouri State	32	10	21.9	.472	.403	.865	3.6	1.1	.6	.3	8.3
2020–21	Missouri State	24	24	**33.7**	**.505**	.386	.847	**6.3**	**3.1**	1.0	.1	19.8
2021–22	Missouri State	**34**	**32**	31.6	.504	**.427**	**.902**	6.2	2.3	**1.2**	.2	**20.4**
2022–23	Missouri	14	3	19.7	.463	.306	.750	2.0	2.5	1.1	**.4**	9.6
Career		104	69	27.5	.494	.397	.871	4.8	2.1	1.0	.2	15.1
