= 2022–23 Drexel Dragons men's basketball team =

American college basketball season

2022–23 Drexel Dragons men's basketball
- Conference: Colonial Athletic Association
- Record: 17–15 (10–8 CAA)
- Head coach: Zach Spiker (7th season)
- Assistant coaches: Paul Fortier (7th season); Justin Jennings (7th season); Will Chavis (2nd season)
- MVP: Amari Williams
- Home arena: Daskalakis Athletic Center

2022–23 CAA men's basketball standings
	Conf.				Overall
Team	W		L	PCT	W		L	PCT
Hofstra	16	–	2	.889	25	–	10	.714
Charleston †	16	–	2	.889	31	–	4	.886
Towson	12	–	6	.667	21	–	12	.636
UNC Wilmington	12	–	6	.667	24	–	10	.706
Drexel	10	–	8	.556	17	–	15	.531
Delaware	8	–	10	.444	17	–	16	.515
North Carolina A&T	8	–	10	.444	13	–	19	.406
William & Mary	7	–	11	.389	13	–	20	.394
Elon	6	–	12	.333	8	–	24	.250
Stony Brook	6	–	12	.333	11	–	22	.333
Northeastern	6	–	12	.333	10	–	20	.333
Hampton	5	–	13	.278	8	–	24	.250
Monmouth	5	–	13	.278	7	–	26	.212
† 2023 CAA tournament winner

The 2022–23 Drexel Dragons men's basketball team represented Drexel University during the 2022–23 NCAA Division I men's basketball season. The Dragons, led by seventh-year head coach Zach Spiker, played their home games at the Daskalakis Athletic Center in Philadelphia, Pennsylvania as members of the Colonial Athletic Association.

== Previous season ==
The Dragons finished the 2021–22 season 15–14, 10–8 in CAA play to finish in sixth place. They lost to Delaware in the CAA tournament quarterfinals.

On May 10, 2022, following the end of the season, it was announced that assistant coach Rob O'Driscoll would be leaving Drexel after seven seasons to become an assistant basketball coach at Maine.

== Offseason ==
=== Departures ===
Name	Number	Pos.	Height	Weight	Year	Hometown	Notes
Melik Martin	2	G/F	6'6"	220	RS Senior	York, PA	Graduated
Trevion Brown	3	G	6'2"	173	RS Junior	Tacoma, WA	Transferred to Old Dominion
Xavier Bell	4	G	6'3"	185	Sophomore	Wichita, KS	Transferred to Wichita State
Camren Wynter	11	G	6'2"	185	Senior	Hempstead, NY	Transferred to Penn State
Matej Juric	15	G	5'11"	190	RS Senior	Toronto, ON, Canada	Graduated
Ata Can Atsüren	23	G	6'3"	192	Freshman	Nilüfer, Turkey	Transferred to Salem
James Butler	51	F	6'8"	235	6th Year Sr	Fairfax Station, VA	Graduated

=== Incoming transfers ===
College recruiting information
Name	Hometown	School	Height	Weight	Commit date
Garfield Turner; PF	Gaithersburg, MD	Odessa	6 ft 8 in (2.03 m)	210 lb (95 kg)	May 20, 2022
Garfield Turner; PF	Recruit ratings: No ratings found				
Yame Butler; SG	Greenbelt, MD	Fordham	6 ft 5 in (1.96 m)	190 lb (86 kg)	Jun 10, 2022
Yame Butler; SG	Recruit ratings: No ratings found				
Jamie Bergens; PG	Almere, Netherlands	Oral Roberts	6 ft 2 in (1.88 m)	180 lb (82 kg)	Jun 12, 2022
Jamie Bergens; PG	Recruit ratings: 247Sports:				
Overall recruit ranking:
Note: In many cases, Scout, Rivals, 247Sports, On3, and ESPN may conflict in their listings of height and weight.; In these cases, the average was taken. ESPN grades are on a 100-point scale.; Sources: "Drexel 2022 Basketball Commitments". Rivals.; "Drexel Dragons". ESPN.; "2022 Team Ranking". Rivals.; "Drexel 2022 Basketball Commits". 247Sports.

=== Recruiting classes ===
==== 2022 recruiting class ====
College recruiting information
Name	Hometown	School	Height	Weight	Commit date
Kobe Magee; SG	Allentown, PA	Executive Education Academy Charter School	6 ft 5 in (1.96 m)	N/A	Jun 23, 2021
Kobe Magee; SG	Recruit ratings: No ratings found				
Justin Moore; PG	Wyncote, PA	Archbishop Wood	6 ft 3 in (1.91 m)	170 lb (77 kg)	Sep 28, 2021
Justin Moore; PG	Recruit ratings: No ratings found				
Shane Blakeney; PG	Rock Hill, SC	Legion Collegiate Academy	6 ft 4 in (1.93 m)	170 lb (77 kg)	Oct 1, 2021
Shane Blakeney; PG	Recruit ratings: No ratings found				
Maximus Fuentes; SG	Boca Raton, FL	North Broward Preparatory School	6 ft 3 in (1.91 m)	180 lb (82 kg)	Apr 17, 2022
Maximus Fuentes; SG	Recruit ratings: No ratings found				
Cole Hargrove; SF	Norristown, PA	Methacton High School	6 ft 8 in (2.03 m)	190 lb (86 kg)	May 22, 2022
Cole Hargrove; SF	Recruit ratings: No ratings found				
Overall recruit ranking:
Note: In many cases, Scout, Rivals, 247Sports, On3, and ESPN may conflict in their listings of height and weight.; In these cases, the average was taken. ESPN grades are on a 100-point scale.; Sources: "Drexel 2022 Basketball Commitments". Rivals.; "Drexel Dragons". ESPN.; "2022 Team Ranking". Rivals.; "Drexel 2022 Basketball Commits". 247Sports.

==== 2023 recruiting class ====
College recruiting information (2023)
Name	Hometown	School	Height	Weight	Commit date
Horace Simmons; SF	Wyndmoor, PA	La Salle College High School	6 ft 6 in (1.98 m)	180 lb (82 kg)	Aug 25, 2022
Horace Simmons; SF	Recruit ratings: 247Sports: ESPN: (77)				
Overall recruit ranking:
Note: In many cases, Scout, Rivals, 247Sports, On3, and ESPN may conflict in their listings of height and weight.; In these cases, the average was taken. ESPN grades are on a 100-point scale.; Sources: "Drexel 2023 Basketball Commitments". Rivals.; "Drexel Dragons". ESPN.; "2023 Team Ranking". Rivals.; "Drexel 2023 Basketball Commits". 247Sports.

== Preseason ==
In a poll of the league coaches at the CAA's media day, Drexel was picked to finish in seventh place in the CAA. Junior Amari Williams was selected to the Preseason CAA All-Conference Second Team.

== Roster ==
2022–23 Drexel Dragons men's basketball team
Players
Coaches

Pos.	#	Name	Height	Weight	Year	Previous school	Hometown
G	0	Coletrane Washington	6 ft 4 in (1.93 m)	190 lb (86 kg)	RS Sr	Quaker Valley HS	Sewickley, PA
G/F	1	Lamar Oden Jr	6 ft 6 in (1.98 m)	215 lb (98 kg)	Jr	Greenforest McCalep	Atlanta, GA
G	2	Hubert Bayigamba (W)	6 ft 2 in (1.88 m)	182 lb (83 kg)	Jr	Wootton HS	Gaithersburg, MD
G	3	Jamie Bergens	6 ft 2 in (1.88 m)	185 lb (84 kg)	Jr	West Nottingham/Oral Roberts	Almere, Netherlands
G	4	Shane Blakeney (redshirt)	6 ft 5 in (1.96 m)	175 lb (79 kg)	Fr	Legion Collegiate Academy	Rock Hill, SC
G	5	Kobe Magee	6 ft 6 in (1.98 m)	180 lb (82 kg)	Fr	Executive Education Academy	Allentown, PA
G	11	Justin Moore	6 ft 3 in (1.91 m)	170 lb (77 kg)	Fr	Archbishop Wood	Wyncote, PA
G	12	Dean Wang (W)	6 ft 1 in (1.85 m)	190 lb (86 kg)	Jr	Friends Select School	Philadelphia, PA
F	13	Garfield Turner	6 ft 8 in (2.03 m)	225 lb (102 kg)	So	Mt. Zion Prep/Odessa	Gaithersburg, MD
F	14	Luke House	6 ft 4 in (1.93 m)	210 lb (95 kg)	Sr	Archbishop John Carroll HS/Cal (PA)	Norristown, PA
F	15	Cole Hargrove	6 ft 8 in (2.03 m)	210 lb (95 kg)	Fr	Methacton High School	Norristown, PA
F	21	Mate Okros	6 ft 6 in (1.98 m)	215 lb (98 kg)	Sr	Myerscough	Debrecen, Hungary
C	22	Amari Williams	6 ft 10 in (2.08 m)	250 lb (113 kg)	Jr	Myerscough	Nottingham, United Kingdom
F	23	Yame Butler	6 ft 5 in (1.96 m)	205 lb (93 kg)	Jr	Fork Union/Fordham	Greenbelt, MD
F	24	Terrence Butler Jr	6 ft 7 in (2.01 m)	235 lb (107 kg)	RS Fr	Bishop McNamara HS	Upper Marlboro, MD
G	25	Max Davis (W)	6 ft 4 in (1.93 m)	200 lb (91 kg)	Fr	IMG Academy	New York, NY
G	30	Maximus Fuentes (W)	6 ft 3 in (1.91 m)	180 lb (82 kg)	Fr	North Broward Prep	Boca Raton, FL

Head coach

- Zach Spiker (Ithaca)

Assistant coach(es)

- Paul Fortier (Washington)
- Justin Jennings (Penn State Behrend)
- Will Chavis (Texas Tech)

Legend

- (C) Team captain
- (S) Suspended
- (I) Ineligible
- (W) Walk-on
- Injured
- Current redshirt

Roster
Last update: October 17, 2022

== Schedule and results ==
Date time, TV	Rank^{#}	Opponent^{#}	Result	Record	High points	High rebounds	High assists	Site (attendance) city, state
Exhibition
August 9, 2022; 12:30 pm		at A.S. Stella Azzurra	W 78–47		19 – Tied	–	–	Arena Altero Felici; Rome, Italy
August 11, 2022; 12:30 pm		at Orange1 Basket Bassano U19	W 84–52		19 – Turner	–	–	Palazzetto Sandro Pertini; Ponte Buggianese, Italy
August 13, 2022		at Bakken						Palasampietro; Casnate, Italy
August 14, 2022; 1:00 pm		at Lombardia All Stars						Costa Masnaga, Italy
Non-conference regular season
November 11, 2022*; 7:00 pm, NBCSPHI		Old Dominion	W 71–59	1–0	16 – Williams	11 – Williams	5 – Moore	Daskalakis Athletic Center (1,919); Philadelphia, PA
November 15, 2022*; 7:00 pm, NBCSPHI		Penn; Battle of 33rd Street	L 59–64	1–1	20 – Williams	7 – Williams	3 – Moore	Daskalakis Athletic Center (2,324); Philadelphia, PA
November 18, 2022*; 6:00 pm		Arcadia	W 85–45	2–1	13 – Oden Jr.	10 – 3 Tied	5 – Okros	Daskalakis Athletic Center (1,007); Philadelphia, PA
November 21, 2022*; 5:00 pm		vs. UT Arlington; Gulf Coast Showcase quarterfinal	W 59–38	3–1	22 – Washington	10 – Williams	4 – Williams	Hertz Arena (654); Estero, FL
November 22, 2022*; 7:30 pm		vs. Florida Gulf Coast; Gulf Coast Showcase semifinal	L 59–67	3–2	20 – Williams	9 – Williams	2 – Okros	Hertz Arena (952); Estero, FL
November 23, 2022*; 5:00 pm		vs. Indiana State; Gulf Coast Showcase 3rd place game	L 81–85	3–3	16 – Oden Jr.	9 – Turner	3 – Moore	Hertz Arena (265); Estero, FL
November 27, 2022*; 2:00 pm, ESPN+		at Temple; City 6	L 61–73	3–4	18 – Williams	6 – Williams	3 – Moore	Liacouras Center (4,102); Philadelphia, PA
November 30, 2022*; 7:00 pm		Lafayette	W 64–56	4–4	18 – Washington	7 – Williams	2 – Oden Jr.	Daskalakis Athletic Center (1,346); Philadelphia, PA
December 3, 2022*; 2:00 pm, NBCSPHI+		Princeton	L 63–83	4–5	16 – Oden Jr.	3 – 4 Tied	4 – Bergens	Daskalakis Athletic Center (1,412); Philadelphia, PA
December 10, 2022*; 12:00 pm, USA		at La Salle; City 6	W 65–58 ^{OT}	5–5	21 – Washington	11 – Williams	4 – Williams	Tom Gola Arena (1,781); Philadelphia, PA
December 14, 2022*; 7:00 pm, FS1		at Seton Hall	L 49–66	5–6	14 – Williams	11 – Williams	3 – 2 Tied	Prudential Center (8,433); Newark, NJ
December 17, 2022*; 2:00 pm		Delaware State	W 85–52	6–6	25 – House	12 – Williams	6 – 2 Tied	Daskalakis Athletic Center (977); Philadelphia, PA
December 22, 2022*; 7:00 pm, ESPN+		at Fairfield	Postponed due to COVID-19					Leo D. Mahoney Arena; Fairfield, CT
CAA regular season
December 29, 2022; 4:00 pm		Elon	W 62–50	7–6 (1–0)	12 – Washington	14 – Williams	6 – Williams	Daskalakis Athletic Center (1,033); Philadelphia, PA
December 31, 2022; 2:00 pm		William & Mary	W 66–56	8–6 (2–0)	18 – Williams	9 – Williams	4 – Moore	Daskalakis Athletic Center (1,002); Philadelphia, PA
January 5, 2023; 7:00 pm, CBSSN		at Towson	L 58–64	8–7 (2–1)	14 – Okros	6 – Turner	3 – Washington	SECU Arena (1,265); Towson, MD
January 7, 2023; 2:00 pm		Monmouth	W 67–35	9–7 (3–1)	13 – Williams	8 – Williams	4 – 2 Tied	Daskalakis Athletic Center (984); Philadelphia, PA
January 12, 2023; 7:00 pm, CBSSN		at Stony Brook	L 66–67	9–8 (3–2)	14 – Williams	6 – Williams	5 – Moore	Island Federal Arena (2,840); Stony Brook, NY
January 14, 2023; 12:00 pm		at Northeastern	W 76–55	10–8 (4–2)	12 – 2 Tied	6 – 2 Tied	5 – Bergens	Matthews Arena (912); Boston, MA
January 19, 2023; 7:00 pm, NBSPHI+		Hampton	W 79–73	11–8 (5–2)	19 – Oden Jr.	11 – Williams	7 – Moore	Daskalakis Athletic Center (1,173); Philadelphia, PA
January 21, 2023; 2:00 pm, NBCSPHI+		Delaware	W 77–74 ^{OT}	12–8 (6–2)	21 – Moore	6 – Williams	3 – 2 Tied	Daskalakis Athletic Center (2,407); Philadelphia, PA
January 26, 2023; 7:00 pm		at North Carolina A&T	L 55–68	12–9 (6–3)	14 – 2 Tied	9 – 2 Tied	6 – Oden Jr.	Corbett Sports Center (2,456); Greensboro, NC
January 28, 2023; 4:00 pm		at Elon	L 58–72	12–10 (6–4)	23 – Williams	8 – Williams	3 – 3 Tied	Schar Center (1,911); Elon, NC
February 2, 2023; 7:00 pm, NBCSPHI		College of Charleston	W 70–69	13–10 (7–4)	19 – Williams	12 – Williams	4 – Moore	Daskalakis Athletic Center (2,009); Philadelphia, PA
February 4, 2023; 2:00 pm, NBCSPHI/SNY		at Monmouth	L 67–69	13–11 (7–5)	18 – House	16 – Williams	5 – Moore	OceanFirst Bank Center (1,562); West Long Branch, NJ
February 8, 2023; 7:00 pm, NBCSPHI		at Delaware	W 58–54	14–11 (8–5)	17 – Y. Butler	9 – Williams	3 – 2 Tied	Bob Carpenter Center (2,685); Newark, DE
February 11, 2023; 2:00 pm		Towson	W 73–66 ^{OT}	15–11 (9–5)	19 – Oden Jr.	12 – Oden Jr.	4 – Williams	Daskalakis Athletic Center (1,448); Philadelphia, PA
February 13, 2023; 7:00 pm		at Hofstra	L 52–66	15–12 (9–6)	13 – Williams	8 – Tied	3 – Tied	Mack Sports Complex (1,784); Hempstead, NY
February 16, 2023; 7:00 pm, NBCSPHI		UNC Wilmington	L 71–72 ^{2OT}	15–13 (9–7)	25 – Y. Butler	9 – Tied	2 – House	Daskalakis Athletic Center (1,118); Philadelphia, PA
February 18, 2023; 4:00 pm		at Hampton	L 72–75	15–14 (9–8)	30 – Y. Butler	10 – Oden Jr.	3 – Washington	Hampton Convocation Center; Hampton, VA
February 23, 2023; 7:00 pm, NBCSPHI		Northeastern	W 75–48	16–14 (10–8)	22 – Y. Butler	11 – Williams	5 – Tied	Daskalakis Athletic Center (1,410); Philadelphia, PA
CAA Tournament
March 4, 2023; 2:30 pm, FloHoops	(5)	vs. (13) Monmouth; Second Round	W 64–45	17–14	16 – Williams	11 – Williams	8 – Moore	Entertainment and Sports Arena (2,031); Washington, D.C.
March 5, 2023; 2:30 pm, FloHoops	(5)	vs. (4) UNC Wilmington; Quarterfinals	L 68–73	17–15	16 – Moore	7 – Williams	4 – Moore	Entertainment and Sports Arena (1,821); Washington, D.C.
*Non-conference game. ^{#}Rankings from AP. (#) Tournament seedings in parentheses. All times are in Eastern Time.

== Awards ==
Yame Butler

- Samuel D. Cozen Award (team's most improved player)

Luke House

- Donald Shank Spirit & Dedication Award

Justin Moore

- CAA All-Rookie Team
- CAA Rookie of the Week
- Assist Award (team leader in assists)

Mate Okros

- Team Academic Award

Amari Williams

- Lefty Driesell Award Finalist
- CAA Defensive Player of the Year
- CAA All-Conference First Team
- CAA All-Defensive Team
- CAA Player of the Week
- Preseason CAA All-Conference Second Team
- Team Most Valuable Player
- Dragon "D" Award (team's top defensive player)
- "Sweep" Award (team leader in rebounds)

== See also ==
- 2022–23 Drexel Dragons women's basketball team
