= 2022–23 Dartmouth Big Green men's basketball team =

American college basketball season

2022–23 Dartmouth Big Green men's basketball
- Conference: Ivy League
- Record: 10–18 (6–8 Ivy)
- Head coach: David McLaughlin (6th season)
- Assistant coaches: Jabari Trotter; Josh Einhorn; Dan Ryan
- Home arena: Leede Arena

2022–23 Ivy League men's basketball standings
	Conf.				Overall
Team	W		L	PCT	W		L	PCT
Yale	10	–	4	.714	21	–	9	.700
Princeton †	10	–	4	.714	23	–	9	.719
Penn	9	–	5	.643	17	–	13	.567
Cornell	7	–	7	.500	17	–	11	.607
Brown	7	–	7	.500	14	–	13	.519
Dartmouth	6	–	8	.429	10	–	18	.357
Harvard	5	–	9	.357	14	–	14	.500
Columbia	2	–	12	.143	7	–	22	.241
† 2023 Ivy League tournament winner

The 2022–23 Dartmouth Big Green men's basketball team represented Dartmouth College in the 2022–23 NCAA Division I men's basketball season. The Big Green, led by sixth-year head coach David McLaughlin, played their home games at Leede Arena in Hanover, New Hampshire as members of the Ivy League.

The Big Green finished the season 10–18, 6–8 in Ivy League play, to finish in sixth place. They failed to qualify for the Ivy League tournament.

== Previous season ==
The Big Green finished the 2021–22 season 9–16, 6–8 in Ivy League play, to finish in fifth place. Since only the top four teams qualify for the Ivy League tournament, they failed to qualify.

== Roster ==
2022–23 Dartmouth Big Green men's basketball team
Players
Coaches

Pos.	#	Name	Height	Weight	Year	Hometown
F	1	Nate Ogbu	6 ft 7 in (2.01 m)	220 lb (100 kg)	Sr	Stone Mountain, GA
F	2	Cade Haskins	6 ft 6 in (1.98 m)	200 lb (91 kg)	So	Minneapolis, MN
F	3	Dusan Neskovic	6 ft 7 in (2.01 m)	205 lb (93 kg)	Jr	Banja Luka, Bosnia and Herzegovina
G	4	Izaiah Robinson	6 ft 3 in (1.91 m)	200 lb (91 kg)	Jr	Montclair, NJ
G	5	Jaren Johnson	6 ft 5 in (1.96 m)	185 lb (84 kg)	Jr	Lynwood, CA
G	10	Ryan Cornish	6 ft 3 in (1.91 m)	170 lb (77 kg)	So	Potomac, MD
F	11	Connor Christensen	6 ft 6 in (1.98 m)	195 lb (88 kg)	So	Eden Prairie, MN
F	12	Paul Hudson	6 ft 6 in (1.98 m)	230 lb (104 kg)	Sr	Charlotte, NC
G	14	Jackson Blaufeld	6 ft 4 in (1.93 m)	195 lb (88 kg)	Sr	Pittsburgh, PA
F	15	Nikola Dimitrijevic	6 ft 10 in (2.08 m)	225 lb (102 kg)	So	Belgrade, Serbia
G	20	Romeo Myrthil	6 ft 2 in (1.88 m)	185 lb (84 kg)	So	Solna, Sweden
F	21	Brandon Mitchell-Day	6 ft 8 in (2.03 m)	205 lb (93 kg)	Fr	Creve Coeur, MO
F	22	Jayden Williams	6 ft 6 in (1.98 m)	185 lb (84 kg)	Fr	Windermere, FL
G	23	Robert III McRae	6 ft 3 in (1.91 m)	200 lb (91 kg)	Jr	Inglewood, CA
F	24	Cam Krystkowiak	6 ft 9 in (2.06 m)	210 lb (95 kg)	Sr	San Diego, CA
F	32	Dame Adelekun	6 ft 8 in (2.03 m)	220 lb (100 kg)	Sr	Gastonia, NC
F	33	Jackson Munro	6 ft 8 in (2.03 m)	220 lb (100 kg)	Fr	Wilmette, IL

Head coach

- David McLaughlin (Colby)

Assistant coach(es)

- Jabari Trotter (Dartmouth)
- Josh Einhorn (Pittsburgh)
- Dan Ryan (Illinois State)

Legend

- (C) Team captain
- (S) Suspended
- (I) Ineligible
- (W) Walk-on
- Injured
- Current redshirt

Roster
Last update: November 14, 2022

== Schedule and results ==
Date time, TV	Rank^{#}	Opponent^{#}	Result	Record	Site (attendance) city, state
Non-conference regular season
November 7, 2022*; 7:30 p.m., ESPN+		at Fordham	L 74–88	0–1	Rose Hill Gymnasium (752); The Bronx, NY
November 11, 2022*; 7:00 p.m., ESPN+		Bryant	L 70–89	0–2	Leede Arena (688); Hanover, NH
November 12, 2022*; 7:00 p.m., ESPN+		MCLA	W 107–52	1–2	Leede Arena (451); Hanover, NH
November 15, 2022*; 7:00 p.m., ESPN+		at Quinnipiac	L 72–81	1–3	M&T Bank Arena; Hamden, CT
November 25, 2022*; 1:00 p.m.		vs. Incarnate Word; San Antonio Shootout	L 64–69	1–4	Convocation Center (265); San Antonio, TX
November 27, 2022*; 8:30 p.m., CUSA.tv		at UTSA; San Antonio Shootout	W 78–77 ^{OT}	2–4	Convocation Center (813); San Antonio, TX
November 28, 2022*; 1:00 p.m.		vs. Grambling State; San Antonio Shootout	L 49–73	2–5	Convocation Center (196); San Antonio, TX
November 30, 2022*; 7:00 p.m., ESPN+		NVU–Johnson	W 99–41	3–5	Leede Arena (331); Hanover, NH
December 3, 2022*; 2:00 p.m., ESPN+		Cal State Bakersfield	W 79–54	4–5	Leede Arena (558); Hanover, NH
December 6, 2022*; 7:00 p.m., ESPN+		Vermont	L 52–68	4–6	Leede Arena (590); Hanover, NH
December 9, 2022*; 7:00 p.m.		at Central Connecticut	L 50–59	4–7	William H. Detrick Gymnasium (1,007); New Britain, CT
December 13, 2022*; 7:00 p.m., ESPN+		at Boston University	L 59–67	4–8	Case Gym (655); Boston, MA
December 16, 2022*; 7:00 p.m., ESPN+		at South Florida	L 55–59	4–9	Yuengling Center (2,606); Tampa, FL
December 20, 2022*; 7:00 p.m., NESN		at UMass	L 57–68	4–10	Mullins Center (2,232); Amherst, MA
December 29, 2022*; 7:00 p.m., ESPN+		New Hampshire	Postponed		Leede Arena; Hanover, NH
Ivy League regular season
January 1, 2023; 2:00 p.m., ESPN+		Cornell	L 63–74	4–11 (0–1)	Leede Arena (645); Hanover, NH
January 6, 2023; 7:00 p.m., ESPN+		at Yale	W 81–77	5–11 (1–1)	John J. Lee Amphitheater (662); New Haven, CT
January 7, 2023; 7:00 p.m., ESPN+		at Brown	L 70–77	5–12 (1–2)	Pizzitola Sports Center (691); Providence, RI
January 14, 2023; 2:00 p.m., ESPN+		Penn	W 75–71	6–12 (2–2)	Leede Arena (855); Hanover, NH
January 16, 2023; 2:00 p.m., ESPN+		at Harvard	W 60–59	7–12 (3–2)	Lavietes Pavilion (1,486); Cambridge, MA
January 21, 2023; 2:00 p.m., ESPN+		at Princeton	L 90–93 ^{OT}	7–13 (3–3)	Jadwin Gymnasium (1,678); Princeton, NJ
January 28, 2023; 2:00 p.m., ESPN+		Columbia	W 83–73	8–13 (4–3)	Leede Arena (951); Hanover, NH
February 3, 2023; 6:00 p.m., ESPN+		Brown	L 61-73	8–14 (4–4)	Leede Arena (667); Hanover, NH
February 4, 2023; 6:00 p.m., ESPN+		Yale	L 53–72	8–15 (4–5)	Leede Arena (806); Hanover, NH
February 11, 2023; 2:00 p.m., ESPN+		Princeton	W 83–76	9–15 (5–5)	Leede Arena (887); Hanover, NH
February 17, 2023; 6:00 p.m., ESPN+		at Cornell	L 83–95 ^{OT}	9–16 (5–6)	Newman Arena (877); Ithaca, NY
February 18, 2023; 7:00 p.m., ESPN+		at Columbia	L 65–71	9–17 (5–7)	Levien Gymnasium (1,201); New York, NY
February 25, 2023; 2:00 p.m., ESPN+		at Penn	L 79–89	9–18 (5–8)	The Palestra (3,382); Philadelphia, PA
March 4, 2023; 2:00 p.m., ESPN+		Harvard	W 87–82	10–18 (6–8)	Leede Arena (884); Hanover, NH
*Non-conference game. ^{#}Rankings from AP poll. (#) Tournament seedings in parentheses. All times are in Eastern.
