= 2022–23 Penn Quakers men's basketball team =

American college basketball season

2022–23 Penn Quakers men's basketball
- Conference: Ivy League
- Record: 17–13 (9–5 Ivy)
- Head coach: Steve Donahue (7th season)
- Associate head coach: Nat Graham
- Assistant coaches: Joe Mihalich; Kris Saulny
- Home arena: The Palestra

2022–23 Ivy League men's basketball standings
	Conf.				Overall
Team	W		L	PCT	W		L	PCT
Yale	10	–	4	.714	21	–	9	.700
Princeton †	10	–	4	.714	23	–	9	.719
Penn	9	–	5	.643	17	–	13	.567
Cornell	7	–	7	.500	17	–	11	.607
Brown	7	–	7	.500	14	–	13	.519
Dartmouth	6	–	8	.429	10	–	18	.357
Harvard	5	–	9	.357	14	–	14	.500
Columbia	2	–	12	.143	7	–	22	.241
† 2023 Ivy League tournament winner

The 2022–23 Penn Quakers men's basketball team represented the University of Pennsylvania in the 2022–23 NCAA Division I men's basketball season. The Quakers, led by seventh-year head coach Steve Donahue, played their home games at The Palestra in Philadelphia, Pennsylvania as members of the Ivy League.

The Quakers finished the season 17–13, 9–5 in Ivy League play, to finish in third place. They were defeated by eventual champions Princeton in the semifinals of the Ivy League tournament.

== Previous season ==
The Quakers finished the 2021–22 season 12–16, 9–5 in Ivy League play, to finish in third place. As the No. 3 seed, they were defeated by No. 2 seed Yale in the semifinals of the Ivy League tournament.

== Roster ==
2022–23 Penn Quakers men's basketball team
Players
Coaches

Pos.	#	Name	Height	Weight	Year	Hometown
G	0	Clark Slajchert	6 ft 1 in (1.85 m)	170 lb (77 kg)	Jr	Los Angeles, CA
G	1	Colin Chambers	6 ft 0 in (1.83 m)	195 lb (88 kg)	Jr	Malvern, PA
G	2	Jonah Charles	6 ft 4 in (1.93 m)	200 lb (91 kg)	Sr	Roselle, NJ
G	3	Jordan Dingle	6 ft 3 in (1.91 m)	195 lb (88 kg)	Jr	Valley Stream, NY
G	4	Cam Thrower	6 ft 3 in (1.91 m)	190 lb (86 kg)	Fr	Manhattan Beach, CA
C	5	Max Lorca-Lloyd	6 ft 9 in (2.06 m)	225 lb (102 kg)	Sr	Melbourne, FL
G/F	10	Eddie III Holland	6 ft 6 in (1.98 m)	210 lb (95 kg)	So	Philadelphia, PA
F	11	Michael Moshkovitz	6 ft 7 in (2.01 m)	230 lb (104 kg)	Sr	Jerusalem, Israel
F/C	12	Gus Larson	6 ft 10 in (2.08 m)	210 lb (95 kg)	So	New Canaan, CT
F/C	13	Nick Spinoso	6 ft 9 in (2.06 m)	240 lb (109 kg)	So	Port Washington, NY
G/F	14	Max Martz	6 ft 6 in (1.98 m)	215 lb (98 kg)	Jr	Upper Arlington, OH
G	15	Andrew Laczkowski	6 ft 6 in (1.98 m)	200 lb (91 kg)	Jr	Dallas, TX
G	22	Lucas Monroe	6 ft 6 in (1.98 m)	200 lb (91 kg)	Sr	Abington, PA
G	24	Reese McMullen	6 ft 3 in (1.91 m)	185 lb (84 kg)	So	Memphis, TN
F/C	34	Chris Ubochi	6 ft 9 in (2.06 m)	215 lb (98 kg)	Fr	Lagos, Nigeria
G	40	George Smith	6 ft 4 in (1.93 m)	205 lb (93 kg)	So	Salem, NH

Head coach

- Steve Donahue (Ursinus)

Assistant coach(es)

- Nat Graham (Penn)
- Joe Mihalich (Nazareth)
- Kris Saulny (Widener)

Legend

- (C) Team captain
- (S) Suspended
- (I) Ineligible
- (W) Walk-on
- Injured
- Current redshirt

Roster
Last update: November 10, 2022

== Schedule and results ==
Date time, TV	Rank^{#}	Opponent^{#}	Result	Record	Site (attendance) city, state
Regular season
November 7, 2022*; 7:00 p.m., ESPN+		at Iona	L 50–78	0–1	Hynes Athletic Center (2,654); New Rochelle, NY
November 11, 2022*; 8:00 p.m., SECN+/ESPN+		at Missouri	L 85–92	0–2	Mizzou Arena (8,483); Columbia, MO
November 13, 2022*; 4:00 p.m., ESPN+		Towson	L 74–80	0–3	The Palestra (1,539); Philadelphia, PA
November 15, 2022*; 7:00 p.m., NBCSPHI/FloHoops		at Drexel; Battle of 33rd Street	W 64–59	1–3	Daskalakis Athletic Center (2,324); Philadelphia, PA
November 18, 2022*; 7:00 p.m., ESPN+		at West Virginia	L 58–92	1–4	WVU Coliseum (9,875); Morgantown, WV
November 22, 2022*; 8:30 p.m., ESPN+		at Lafayette	W 74–68 ^{OT}	2–4	Kirby Sports Center (1,364); Easton, PA
November 25, 2022*; 4:30 p.m., ESPN+		Hartford; Cathedral Classic	W 75–55	3–4	The Palestra (1,491); Philadelphia, PA
November 26, 2022*; 4:30 p.m., ESPN+		Colgate; Cathedral Classic	W 81–69	4–4	The Palestra (1,782); Philadelphia, PA
November 27, 2022*; 4:30 p.m., ESPN+		Delaware; Cathedral Classic	W 86–73	5–4	The Palestra (1,586); Philadelphia, PA
November 30, 2022*; 8:30 p.m., NBCSPHI+/ESPN+		Saint Joseph's; Philadelphia Big 5	L 80–85 ^{OT}	5–5	The Palestra (3,246); Philadelphia, PA
December 3, 2022*; 2:00 p.m., ESPN+		La Salle; Philadelphia Big 5	L 81–84 ^{OT}	5–6	The Palestra (1,739); Philadelphia, PA
December 7, 2022*; 7:00 p.m., CBSSN		at Villanova; Philadelphia Big 5	L 59–70	5–7	Finneran Pavilion (6,501); Villanova, PA
December 10, 2022*; 1:00 p.m., NBCSPHI/ESPN+		Temple; Philadelphia Big 5	W 77–57	6–7	The Palestra (3,252); Philadelphia, PA
December 28, 2022*; 2:00 p.m., ESPN+		Wilkes	W 93–61	7–7	The Palestra (1,786); Philadelphia, PA
Ivy League regular season
January 2, 2023; 7:00 p.m., ESPN+		at Brown	W 76–68	8–7 (1–0)	Pizzitola Sports Center (740); Providence, RI
January 6, 2023; 7:00 p.m., ESPN+		at Cornell	L 69–88	8–8 (1–1)	Newman Arena (655); Ithaca, NY
January 7, 2023; 7:00 p.m., ESPN+		at Columbia	W 84–55	9–8 (2–1)	Levien Gymnasium (1,963); New York, NY
January 14, 2023; 2:00 p.m., ESPN+		at Dartmouth	L 71–75	9–9 (2–2)	Leede Arena (855); Hanover, NH
January 16, 2023; 7:00 p.m., NBCSPHI/ESPN+		Princeton; Rivalry	L 60–72	9–10 (2–3)	The Palestra (3,861); Philadelphia, PA
January 21, 2023; 6:00 p.m., ESPN+		at Yale	L 63–70	9–11 (2–4)	John J. Lee Amphitheater (1,922); New Haven, CT
January 23, 2023*; 7:00 p.m., HH All-Access		at Hartford	W 76–52	10–11	Chase Arena (384); West Hartford, CT
January 28, 2023; 2:00 p.m., ESPN+		Harvard	W 83–68	11–11 (3–4)	The Palestra (3,408); Philadelphia, PA
February 3, 2023; 7:00 p.m., ESPN+		Columbia	W 74–65	12–11 (4–4)	The Palestra (1,423); Philadelphia, PA
February 4, 2023; 6:00 p.m., ESPN+		Cornell	W 92–86	13–11 (5–4)	The Palestra (2,521); Philadelphia, PA
February 11, 2023; 2:00 p.m., ESPN+		at Harvard	W 80–72	14–11 (6–4)	Lavietes Pavilion (1,636); Cambridge, MA
February 17, 2023; 7:00 p.m., ESPNews		Yale	W 66–64	15–11 (7–4)	The Palestra (2,685); Philadelphia, PA
February 18, 2023; 6:00 p.m., ESPN+		Brown	W 90–69	16–11 (8–4)	The Palestra (3,523); Philadelphia, PA
February 25, 2023; 2:00 p.m., ESPN+		Dartmouth	W 89–79	17–11 (9–4)	The Palestra (3,382); Philadelphia, PA
March 4, 2023; 4:00 p.m., ESPN+		at Princeton; Rivalry	L 69–77 ^{OT}	17–12 (9–5)	Jadwin Gymnasium (3,243); Princeton, NJ
Ivy League tournament
March 11, 2023; 1:30 p.m., ESPNU	(3)	vs. (2) Princeton; Semifinals	L 70–77	17–13	Jadwin Gymnasium; Princeton, NJ
*Non-conference game. ^{#}Rankings from AP poll. (#) Tournament seedings in parentheses. All times are in Eastern.
