= 2022–23 Missouri Tigers men's basketball team =

American college basketball season

2022–23 Missouri Tigers men's basketball

NCAA tournament, Second Round
- Conference: Southeastern Conference

Ranking
- AP: No. 23
- Record: 25–10 (11–7 SEC)
- Head coach: Dennis Gates (1st season)
- Associate head coach: Charlton Young (1st season)
- Assistant coaches: Dickey Nutt (1st season); Kyle Smithpeters (1st season)
- Home arena: Mizzou Arena

2022–23 Southeastern Conference men's basketball standings
	Conf.				Overall
Team	W		L	PCT	W		L	PCT
No. 1 Alabama†	16	–	2	.889	31	–	6	.838
No. 17 Texas A&M	15	–	3	.833	25	–	10	.714
Kentucky	12	–	6	.667	22	–	12	.647
No. 23 Missouri	11	–	7	.611	25	–	10	.714
No. 20 Tennessee	11	–	7	.611	25	–	11	.694
Vanderbilt	11	–	7	.611	22	–	15	.595
Auburn	10	–	8	.556	21	–	13	.618
Florida	9	–	9	.500	16	–	17	.485
Mississippi State	8	–	10	.444	21	–	13	.618
Arkansas	8	–	10	.444	22	–	14	.611
Georgia	6	–	12	.333	16	–	16	.500
South Carolina	4	–	14	.222	11	–	21	.344
Ole Miss	3	–	15	.167	12	–	21	.364
LSU	2	–	16	.111	14	–	19	.424
† 2023 SEC tournament winner Rankings from AP poll

The 2022–23 Missouri Tigers men's basketball team represented the University of Missouri in the 2022–23 NCAA Division I men's basketball season and is led by first-year head coach Dennis Gates. The team plays its home games at Mizzou Arena in Columbia, Missouri as an eleventh-year members of the Southeastern Conference. They finished the season 23–8, 11-7 in SEC play to finish in 4th place. They defeated Tennessee in the first round of the SEC tournament before losing to Alabama in the second round. Tigers received an at-large bid to the NCAA tournament, where they were awarded a No. 7 seed in the South Region. They defeated Utah State in the first round before suffering an upset defeat by 15th-seeded Princeton in the second round.

== Previous season ==
The Tigers finished the season 12–21, 5–13 in SEC play to finish in 12th place. They defeated Ole Miss in the first round of the SEC tournament before losing to LSU in the second round.

Following the season, the school fired head coach Cuonzo Martin. On March 22, 2022, the school named Cleveland State head coach Dennis Gates the new head coach of the Tigers.

== Offseason ==
=== Departures ===
Name	Number	Pos.	Height	Weight	Year	Hometown	Reason for departure
Anton Brookshire	0	G	6'1"	175	Freshman	Springfield, MO	Transferred to Iona
Amari Davis	1	G	6'2"	175	Senior	Trotwood, OH	Transferred to Wright State
Sean Durugordon	2	F	6'5"	175	RS-Freshman	Queens, NY	Transferred to Austin Peay
Javon Pickett	4	G	6'5"	215	Senior	Belleville, IL	Transferred to St. Louis
Jarron Coleman	5	G	6'5"	210	RS-Senior	Indianapolis, IN	Transferred to Ball State
Yaya Keita	11	F	6'8"	240	Sophomore	St. Louis, MO	Transferred to Oklahoma
DaJuan Gordon	12	G	6'3"	190	Junior	Chicago, IL	Transferred to New Mexico State
Trevon Brazile	23	F	6'9"	215	Freshman	Springfield, MO	Transferred to Arkansas
Jordan Wilmore	32	C	7'3"	300	Sophomore	Laurel, MD	Transferred to Northwestern State

=== Incoming transfers ===
Name	Number	Pos.	Height	Weight	Year	Hometown	Previous school
Mohamed Diarra	0	F/C	6'10"	215	Sophomore	Paris, France	Transfer from Garden City Broncbusters. He will have three years of eligibility left.
Tre Gomillion	2	G	6'4"	215	Senior	Augusta, GA	Transfer from Cleveland State. He will have one year of eligibility left.
DeAndre Gholston	4	G	6'2"	215	Redshirt-Senior	Gary, IN	Transfer from Milwaukee. He will have one year of eligibility left.
D'Moi Hodge	5	G	6'4"	180	Senior	Tortola, British Virgin Islands	Transfer from Cleveland State. He will have one year of eligibility left.
Nick Honor	10	G	5'10"	195	Senior	Orlando, FL	Transfer from Clemson. He will have two years of eligibility left.
Isiaih Mosley	11	G	6'5"	194	Senior	Macon, MO	Transfer from Missouri State. He will have two years of eligibility left.
Noah Carter	35	F	6'6"	225	Sophomore	Dubuque, IA	Transfer from Northern Iowa. He will have three years of eligibility left.
Mabor Majak	45	C	7'2"	230	Sophomore	Biemnon, South Sudan	Transfer from Cleveland State.
Sean East II	55	G	6'3"	185	Junior	Louisville, KY	Transfer from John A. Logan College. He will have two years of eligibility left.

=== Recruiting classes ===
==== 2022 recruiting class ====
College recruiting information
Name	Hometown	School	Height	Weight	Commit date
Aidan Shaw; F	Stillwell, KS	Blue Valley High School	6 ft 8 in (2.03 m)	195 lb (88 kg)	
Aidan Shaw; F	Recruit ratings: Scout: Rivals: 247Sports: ESPN: (83)				
Overall recruit ranking:
Note: In many cases, Scout, Rivals, 247Sports, On3, and ESPN may conflict in their listings of height and weight.; In these cases, the average was taken. ESPN grades are on a 100-point scale.; Sources:

==== 2023 recruiting class ====
College recruiting information (2023)
Name	Hometown	School	Height	Weight	Commit date
Anthony Robinson; G	Tallahassee, FL	Florida State University School	6 ft 2 in (1.88 m)	175 lb (79 kg)	
Anthony Robinson; G	Recruit ratings: Rivals: 247Sports: ESPN: (81)				
Trent Pierce; F	Tulsa, OK	Union High School	6 ft 8 in (2.03 m)	185 lb (84 kg)	
Trent Pierce; F	Recruit ratings: Rivals: 247Sports: ESPN: (84)				
Jordan Butler; C	Mauldin, SC	Christ Church Episcopal School	6 ft 10 in (2.08 m)	220 lb (100 kg)	
Jordan Butler; C	Recruit ratings: Rivals: 247Sports: ESPN: (82)				
Overall recruit ranking: Rivals: 18
Note: In many cases, Scout, Rivals, 247Sports, On3, and ESPN may conflict in their listings of height and weight.; In these cases, the average was taken. ESPN grades are on a 100-point scale.; Sources:

== Roster ==
2022–23 Missouri Tigers men's basketball team
Players
Coaches

Pos.	#	Name	Height	Weight	Year	Previous school	Hometown
F	0	Mohamed Diarra	6 ft 10 in (2.08 m)	215 lb (98 kg)	Jr	Garden City CC	Paris, France
G	1	Kaleb Brown	6 ft 6 in (1.98 m)	250 lb (113 kg)	So	Lee High School	Huntsville, AL
G	2	Tre Gomillion	6 ft 4 in (1.93 m)	215 lb (98 kg)	Sr	Aquinas High School; Cleveland State	Augusta, GA
G	4	Deandre Gholston	6 ft 5 in (1.96 m)	215 lb (98 kg)	RS Sr	21st Century; Milwaukee	Gary, IN
G	5	D'Moi Hodge	6 ft 4 in (1.93 m)	188 lb (85 kg)	Sr	Faith Baptist Academy; Cleveland State	Tortola, British Virgin Islands
G	10	Nick Honor	5 ft 10 in (1.78 m)	200 lb (91 kg)	RS Sr	Lake Highland Preparatory School; Clemson	Orlando, FL
G	11	Isiaih Mosley	6 ft 5 in (1.96 m)	205 lb (93 kg)	Sr	Rock Bridge High School; Missouri State	Macon, MO
G	12	Jackson Francois (W)	6 ft 4 in (1.93 m)	155 lb (70 kg)	Fr	Bishop Gorman High School	Las Vegas, NV
F	13	Ronnie DeGray III	6 ft 6 in (1.98 m)	225 lb (102 kg)	Jr	Woodstock Academy; UMass	Parker, CO
F	23	Aidan Shaw	6 ft 8 in (2.03 m)	195 lb (88 kg)	Fr	Blue Valley High School	Stillwell, KS
G/F	24	Kobe Brown	6 ft 8 in (2.03 m)	250 lb (113 kg)	Sr	Lee High School	Huntsville, AL
G	31	Ben Sternberg (W)	6 ft 0 in (1.83 m)	165 lb (75 kg)	GS	Beachwood High School; Cleveland State	Cleveland, OH
F	35	Noah Carter	6 ft 6 in (1.98 m)	235 lb (107 kg)	Jr	Dubuque Senior High School; Northern Iowa	Dubuque, IA
C	45	Mabor Majak (W)	7 ft 2 in (2.18 m)	245 lb (111 kg)	Jr	Hamilton Southeastern High School; Cleveland State	Biemnon, South Sudan
G	55	Sean East II	6 ft 3 in (1.91 m)	180 lb (82 kg)	Jr	New Albany High School; John A. Logan College	Louisville, KY

Head coach

- Dennis Gates (California)

Assistant coach(es)

- Charlton Young (Georgia Southern)
- Dickey Nutt (Oklahoma State)
- Kyle Smithpeters (Southern Illinois)

Legend

- (C) Team captain
- (S) Suspended
- (I) Ineligible
- (W) Walk-on
- Injured
- Current redshirt

Roster

== Schedule and results ==
Date time, TV	Rank^{#}	Opponent^{#}	Result	Record	High points	High rebounds	High assists	Site (attendance) city, state
Exhibition
November 3, 2022*; 7:00 p.m.		Washington University	W 89–61	0–0	25 – Ko. Brown	11 – Ko. Brown	4 – Mosley	Mizzou Arena; Columbia, MO
Regular Season
November 7, 2022*; 7:00 p.m., SECN+/ESPN+		Southern Indiana	W 97–91	1–0	20 – Ko. Brown	14 – Ko. Brown	5 – East II	Mizzou Arena (10,723); Columbia, MO
November 11, 2022*; 7:00 p.m., SECN+/ESPN+		Penn	W 92–85	2–0	28 – Carter	8 – Carter	5 – Gomillion	Mizzou Arena (8,483); Columbia, MO
November 13, 2022*; 5:00 p.m., SECN+/ESPN+		Lindenwood	W 82–53	3–0	14 – Carter	9 – Ko. Brown	7 – Ko. Brown	Mizzou Arena (7,914); Columbia, MO
November 15, 2022*; 7:00 p.m., SECN+/ESPN+		SIU Edwardsville	W 105–80	4–0	30 – Hodge	7 – Hodge	5 – East II	Mizzou Arena (8,241); Columbia, MO
November 20, 2022*; 6:30 p.m., SECN+/ESPN+		Mississippi Valley State; Collegiate Hoops Roadshow	W 83–62	5–0	18 – Hodge	6 – Ko. Brown	6 – Honor	Mizzou Arena (7,052); Columbia, MO
November 23, 2022*; 6:00 p.m., SECN+/ESPN+		Coastal Carolina; Collegiate Hoops Roadshow	W 89–51	6–0	23 – Mosley	7 – Ko. Brown	7 – Hodge	Mizzou Arena (7,459); Columbia, MO
November 26, 2022*; 11:00 a.m., SECN		Houston Christian	W 105–69	7–0	22 – Gholston	3 – Gholston	5 – Carter	Mizzou Arena (7,610); Columbia, MO
November 29, 2022*; 7:00 p.m., ESPN+		at Wichita State	W 88–84 ^{OT}	8–0	20 – Carter	8 – Carter	4 – Tied	Charles Koch Arena (7,401); Wichita, KS
December 4, 2022*; 3:00 p.m., SECN+/ESPN+		Southeast Missouri State	W 96–89	9–0	25 – Ko. Brown	8 – Ko. Brown	6 – East II	Mizzou Arena (8,873); Columbia, MO
December 10, 2022*; 4:15 p.m., ESPN		No. 6 Kansas; Border War	L 67–95	9–1	15 – Tied	7 – Tied	5 – Honor	Mizzou Arena (15,061); Columbia, MO
December 17, 2022*; 11:00 a.m., BSMW		vs. UCF; Orange Bowl Basketball Classic	W 68–66	10–1	17 – Honor	5 – Tied	4 – Mosley	FLA Live Arena (6897); Sunrise, FL
December 22, 2022*; 8:00 p.m., SECN		vs. No. 16 Illinois; Braggin' Rights	W 93–71	11–1	31 – Ko. Brown	8 – Ko. Brown	8 – Ko. Brown	Enterprise Center (18,452); St. Louis, MO
December 28, 2022; 6:00 p.m., SECN		No. 19 Kentucky	W 89–75	12–1 (1–0)	30 – Ko. Brown	6 – Ko. Brown	6 – Honor	Mizzou Arena (15,061); Columbia, MO
January 4, 2023; 7:30 p.m., SECN	No. 20	at No. 13 Arkansas; Battle Line	L 68–74	12–2 (1–1)	13 – East II	4 – Tied	4 – Honor	Bud Walton Arena (19,200); Fayetteville, AR
January 7, 2023; 11:00 a.m., CBS	No. 20	Vanderbilt	W 85–83	13–2 (2–1)	18 – Tied	8 – Ko. Brown	7 – East II	Mizzou Arena (15,061); Columbia, MO
January 11, 2023; 7:30 p.m., SECN	No. 20	at Texas A&M	L 64–82	13–3 (2–2)	12 – Ko. Brown	6 – Hodge	3 – East II	Reed Arena (6,916); College Station, TX
January 14, 2023; 2:30 p.m., SECN	No. 20	at Florida	L 64–73	13–4 (2–3)	21 – Ko. Brown	6 – Tied	3 – Honor	O'Connell Center (9,301); Gainesville, FL
January 18, 2023; 8:00 p.m., SECN		No. 25 Arkansas; Battle Line	W 79–76	14–4 (3–3)	17 – Ko. Brown	6 – Ko. Brown	3 – Gholston	Mizzou Arena (14,448); Columbia, MO
January 21, 2023; 5:00 p.m., SECN		No. 4 Alabama	L 64–85	14–5 (3–4)	19 – Mosley	12 – Diarra	4 – East II	Mizzou Arena (15,061); Columbia, MO
January 24, 2023; 6:00 p.m., SECN		at Ole Miss	W 89–77	15–5 (4–4)	24 – Hodge	6 – Diarra	5 – Tied	SJB Pavilion (6,260); Oxford, MS
January 28, 2023*; 1:00 p.m., ESPN2		No. 12 Iowa State; Big 12/SEC Challenge	W 78–61	16–5	20 – Ko. Brown	12 – Ko. Brown	4 – Tied	Mizzou Arena (15,061); Columbia, MO
February 1, 2023; 8:00 p.m., SECN		LSU	W 87–77	17–5 (5–4)	26 – Ko. Brown	10 – Diarra	6 – East II	Mizzou Arena (12,769); Columbia, MO
February 4, 2023; 5:00 p.m., SECN		at Mississippi State	L 52–63	17–6 (5–5)	12 – Gholston	10 – Diarra	5 – Gholston	Humphrey Coliseum (8,494); Starkville, MS
February 7, 2023; 8:00 p.m., SECN		South Carolina	W 83–74	18–6 (6–5)	19 – Ko. Brown	8 – Ko. Brown	6 – Ko. Brown	Mizzou Arena (8,830); Columbia, MO
February 11, 2023; 5:00 p.m., SECN		at No. 6 Tennessee	W 86–85	19–6 (7–5)	21 – Ko. Brown	5 – Ko. Brown	4 – East II	Thompson–Boling Arena (21,678); Knoxville, TN
February 14, 2023; 6:00 p.m., ESPN2		at Auburn	L 56–89	19–7 (7–6)	14 – East II	5 – Tied	5 – Ko. Brown	Neville Arena (9,121); Auburn, AL
February 18, 2023; 5:00 p.m., ESPN2		Texas A&M	L 60–69	19–8 (7–7)	24 – Ko. Brown	7 – Diarra	3 – Tied	Mizzou Arena (15,061); Columbia, MO
February 21, 2023; 6:00 p.m., SECN		Mississippi State	W 66–64 ^{OT}	20–8 (8–7)	17 – Ko. Brown	10 – Gomillion	5 – Honor	Mizzou Arena (12,041); Columbia, MO
February 25, 2023; 1:00 p.m., SECN		at Georgia	W 85–63	21–8 (9–7)	18 – Hodge	9 – Ko. Brown	4 – Tied	Stegeman Coliseum (10,523); Athens, GA
March 1, 2023; 8:00 p.m., SECN		at LSU	W 81–76	22–8 (10–7)	23 – Hodge	7 – Carter	6 – East II	Pete Maravich Assembly Center (8,453); Baton Rouge, LA
March 4, 2023; 2:30 p.m., SECN		Ole Miss; Senior Day	W 82–77	23–8 (11–7)	18 – Ko. Brown	11 – Ko. Brown	4 – Honor	Mizzou Arena (15,061); Columbia, Missouri
SEC Tournament
March 10, 2023; 2:00 p.m., ESPN	(4) No. 25	vs. (5) No. 17 Tennessee; Quarterfinals	W 79–71	24–8	26 – Hodge	9 – Ko. Brown	4 – Honor	Bridgestone Arena (16,107); Nashville, TN
March 11, 2023; 12:00 p.m., ESPN	(4) No. 25	vs. (1) No. 4 Alabama; Semifinals	L 61–72	24–9	21 – Hodge	9 – Hodge	2 – Tied	Bridgestone Arena (19,395); Nashville, TN
NCAA Tournament
March 16, 2023; 12:40 p.m., TNT	(7 S) No. 23	vs. (10 S) Utah State; First Round	W 76–65	25–9	23 – Hodge	8 – Ko. Brown	8 – Ko. Brown	Golden 1 Center (14896); Sacramento, CA
March 18, 2023; 5:10 p.m., TNT	(7 S) No. 23	vs. (15 S) Princeton; Second Round	L 63–78	25–10	19 – Gholston	7 – Ko. Brown	3 – Tied	Golden 1 Center; Sacramento, CA
*Non-conference game. ^{#}Rankings from AP Poll. (#) Tournament seedings in parentheses. S=South. All times are in Central Time.

== Rankings ==
Ranking movements Legend: ██ Increase in ranking ██ Decrease in ranking — = Not ranked RV = Received votes
	Week																				
Poll	Pre	1	2	3	4	5	6	7	8	9	10	11	12	13	14	15	16	17	18	19	Final
AP	—	—	—	—	—	—	—	—	RV	20	20	RV	RV	RV	RV	RV	RV	RV	25	23	Not released
Coaches	—	—*	—	—	—	RV	—	—	RV	21	20	RV	RV	RV	RV	RV	—	—	—	24	RV

*Coaches did not release a week 1 poll.
