= Jordan Dingle =

American basketball player

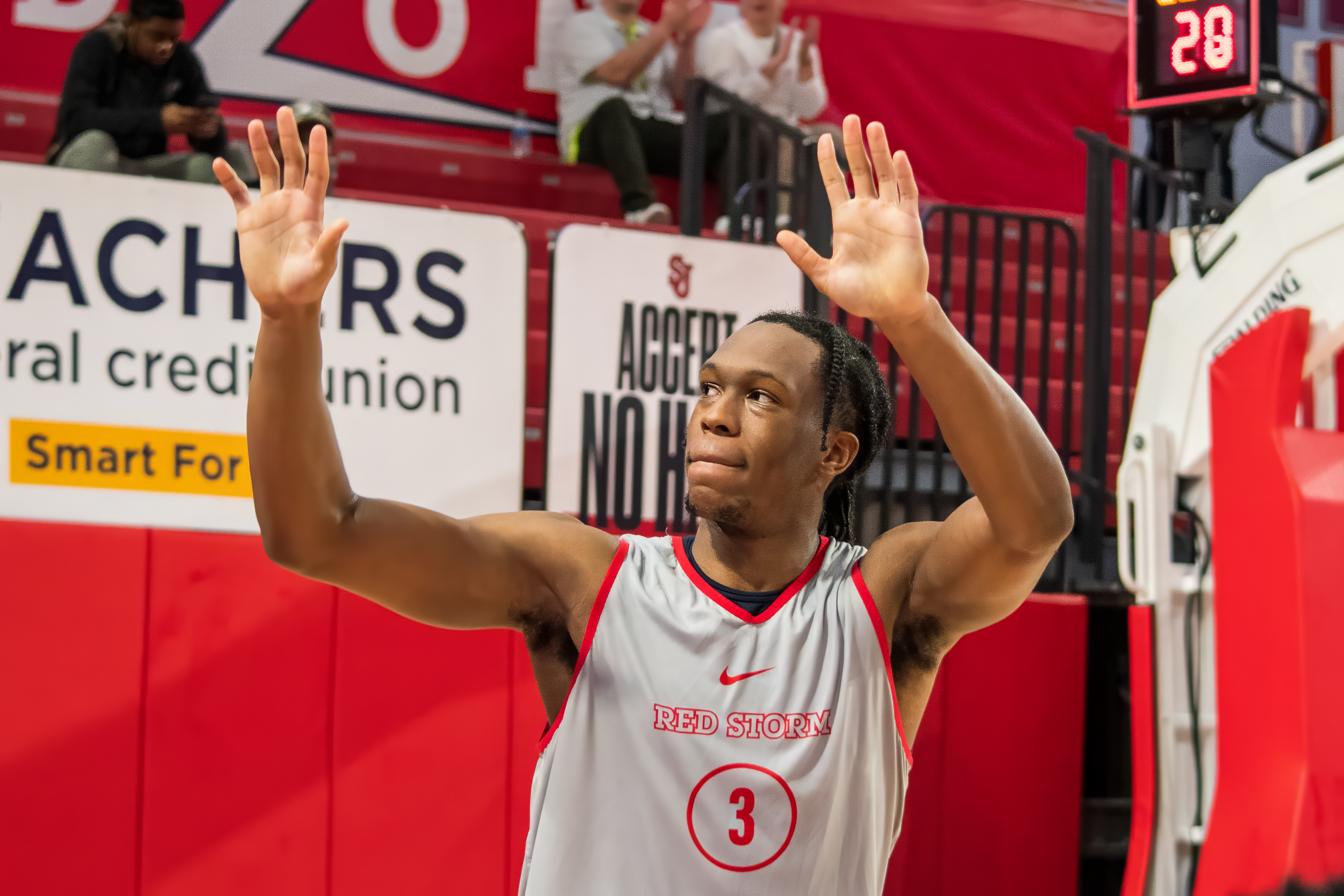
- Dingle with the St. John's Red Storm

No. 25 – Long Island Nets
- Position: Shooting guard
- League: NBA G League

Personal information
- Born: July 14, 2000 (age 26) Valley Stream, New York, U.S.
- Listed height: 6 ft 3 in (1.91 m)
- Listed weight: 190 lb (86 kg)

Career information
- High school: Lawrence Woodmere Academy (Woodmere, New York); Blair Academy (Blairstown, New Jersey)
- College: Penn (2019–2023); St. John's (2023–2024)
- NBA draft: 2024: undrafted
- Playing career: 2024–present

Career history
- 2024–2025: Vojvodina
- 2026: Bora
- 2026–present: Long Island Nets

Career highlights
- Ivy League Player of the Year (2023); 2× First-team All-Ivy League (2022, 2023); Ivy League Rookie of the Year (2020); Robert V. Geasey Trophy (2023)

Jordan Dingle (born July 14, 2000) is an American professional basketball player for the Long Island Nets of the NBA G League. He played college basketball for the St. John's Red Storm and Penn Quakers, where he was a two-time All-Ivy League selection and the 2023 Ivy League Player of the Year.

== Early life and high school career ==
Dingle grew up in Valley Stream, New York and initially attended Lawrence Woodmere Academy. Before the start of his junior year, he transferred to Blair Academy, a boarding school in Blairstown, New Jersey.

== College career ==
Dingle became a starter during his freshman season and was named the Ivy League Rookie of the Year after averaging 13.5 points, 2.3 assists, and 3.4 rebounds per game. He took a leave of absence from Penn during his true sophomore year after the 2020–21 season was canceled in the Ivy League due to the COVID-19 pandemic. Dingle was named first-team All-Ivy League in 2022 after he averaged 20.9 points, 2.4 assists, and 3.6 rebounds over 26 games. Dingle finished second in the nation with 23.4 points per game and was named the Ivy League Player of the Year and won the Robert V. Geasey Trophy as the top player in the Philadelphia Big 5 as a junior. After the season he entered the NCAA transfer portal.

Dingle committed to St. John's and newly-hired head coach Rick Pitino. He averaged 11.6 points and 1.7 assists per game. Following the season he applied for a fifth-year waiver but was rejected by the NCAA.

== Professional career ==
=== Vojvodina (2024–2025) ===
On August 6, 2024, Dingle signed with Vojvodina of the Basketball League of Serbia (KLS) to begin his professional career. In 30 games, he averaged 11.1 points, 1.2 rebounds, and 1.7 assists per game.

=== Bora (2026) ===
On March 5, 2026, Dingle signed with Bora of the Kosovo Basketball Superleague.

=== Long Island Nets (2026–present) ===
On October 28, 2026, Dingle joined the Long Island Nets of the NBA G League.

== Career statistics ==
Legend
GP	Games played	GS	Games started	MPG	Minutes per game
FG%	Field goal percentage	3P%	3-point field goal percentage	FT%	Free throw percentage
RPG	Rebounds per game	APG	Assists per game	SPG	Steals per game
BPG	Blocks per game	PPG	Points per game	**Bold**	Career high

=== College ===
Year	Team	GP	GS	MPG	FG%	3P%	FT%	RPG	APG	SPG	BPG	PPG
2019–20	Penn	25	20	31.3	.416	.339	.583	3.4	2.3	.8	.0	13.5
2020–21	Penn	The Ivy League canceled the season due to COVID-19 pandemic concerns.										
2021–22	Penn	26	**26**	31.8	.446	.335	.810	**3.6**	**2.4**	.8	.0	20.9
2022–23	Penn	28	**26**	**33.5**	**.464**	**.356**	**.856**	**3.6**	2.3	**1.1**	**.1**	**23.4**
2023–24	St. John's	**31**	23	25.1	.440	.311	.745	2.0	1.7	0.8	**.1**	11.6
Career		110	95	30.3	.444	.337	.785	3.1	2.1	.9	.1	17.2

== Personal life ==
Dingle's father, Dana Dingle, played college basketball at UMass and was a starter for the Minutemen in the 1996 Final Four.
