= 2022–23 Harvard Crimson men's basketball team =

American college basketball season

2022–23 Harvard Crimson men's basketball
- Conference: Ivy League
- Record: 14–14 (5–9 Ivy)
- Head coach: Tommy Amaker (15th season)
- Assistant coaches: Mike Sotsky; Larry Farmer; Matt Fraschilla
- Home arena: Lavietes Pavilion

2022–23 Ivy League men's basketball standings
	Conf.				Overall
Team	W		L	PCT	W		L	PCT
Yale	10	–	4	.714	21	–	9	.700
Princeton †	10	–	4	.714	23	–	9	.719
Penn	9	–	5	.643	17	–	13	.567
Cornell	7	–	7	.500	17	–	11	.607
Brown	7	–	7	.500	14	–	13	.519
Dartmouth	6	–	8	.429	10	–	18	.357
Harvard	5	–	9	.357	14	–	14	.500
Columbia	2	–	12	.143	7	–	22	.241
† 2023 Ivy League tournament winner

The 2022–23 Harvard Crimson men's basketball team represented Harvard University in the 2022–23 NCAA Division I men's basketball season. The Crimson, led by 15th-year head coach Tommy Amaker, played their home games at the Lavietes Pavilion in Boston, Massachusetts as members of the Ivy League. They finished the season with a record of 14–14, 5–9 in Ivy League play to place seventh. They failed to qualify for the Ivy League tournament.

== Previous season ==
The Crimson finished the 2021–22 season 13–13, 5–9 in Ivy League play to finish in a tie for sixth place. They failed to qualify for the Ivy League tournament, as only the top 4 teams qualify.

== Roster ==
2022–23 Harvard Crimson men's basketball team
Players
Coaches

Pos.	#	Name	Height	Weight	Year	Hometown
G	0	Tyler Simon	6 ft 5 in (1.96 m)	187 lb (85 kg)	So	Houston, Texas
F	1	Josh Hemmings	6 ft 9 in (2.06 m)	230 lb (104 kg)	Jr	Toronto, Ontario
G	2	Luka Sakota	6 ft 6 in (1.98 m)	195 lb (88 kg)	Sr	Etobicoke, Ontario
G	3	Idan Tretout	6 ft 4 in (1.93 m)	200 lb (91 kg)	Sr	Brooklyn, New York
G/F	4	Chris Ledlum	6 ft 6 in (1.98 m)	225 lb (102 kg)	Sr	Brooklyn, New York
F	10	Chisom Okpara	6 ft 8 in (2.03 m)	225 lb (102 kg)	Fr	Bronxville, New York
G	11	Evan Nelson	6 ft 2 in (1.88 m)	170 lb (77 kg)	So	Tucson, Arizona
G	13	Chandler Piggé	6 ft 5 in (1.96 m)	210 lb (95 kg)	Fr	Houston, Texas
G	14	Greg Cooper	6 ft 0 in (1.83 m)	160 lb (73 kg)	Fr	Cambridge, Massachusetts
G	20	Sam Silverstein	6 ft 6 in (1.98 m)	195 lb (88 kg)	Jr	Glencoe, Illinois
F	22	Justice Ajogbor	6 ft 10 in (2.08 m)	255 lb (116 kg)	Jr	Benin City, Nigeria
G	23	Louis Lesmond	6 ft 6 in (1.98 m)	190 lb (86 kg)	So	Paris, France
G	25	Christian Rich	6 ft 3 in (1.91 m)	190 lb (86 kg)	Jr	Holladay, Utah
F	32	Tommy O'Neil	6 ft 8 in (2.03 m)	210 lb (95 kg)	Sr	Lexington, Massachusetts
F	42	Bennett Pitcher	6 ft 9 in (2.06 m)	285 lb (129 kg)	So	Deerfield, Massachusetts
C	54	Matt Filipowski	7 ft 0 in (2.13 m)	240 lb (109 kg)	Fr	Westtown, New York
G	55	Denham Wojcik	6 ft 2 in (1.88 m)	178 lb (81 kg)	So	Charleston, South Carolina

Head coach

- Tommy Amaker (Duke)

Assistant coach(es)

- Mike Sotsky (Harvard)
- Larry Farmer (Denison)
- Matt Fraschilla (Harvard)

Legend

- (C) Team captain
- (S) Suspended
- (I) Ineligible
- (W) Walk-on
- Injured
- Current redshirt

Roster
Last update: November 25, 2022

== Schedule and results ==
Date time, TV	Rank^{#}	Opponent^{#}	Result	Record	Site (attendance) city, state
Non-conference regular season
November 7, 2022*; 5:00 pm		at Morehouse	W 68–63	1–0	Forbes Arena (1,050); Atlanta, GA
November 11, 2022*; 6:00 pm, ESPN+		vs. Louisiana; Asheville Championship semifinals	L 61–75	1–1	Harrah's Cherokee Center (565); Asheville, NC
November 13, 2022*; 2:00 pm, ESPNU		vs. Elon; Asheville Championship third-place game	W 92–77	2–1	Harrah's Cherokee Center (1,221); Asheville, NC
November 16, 2022*; 7:00 pm, NESN/FloHoops		at Northeastern	W 70–69	3–1	Matthews Arena (1,339); Boston, MA
November 20, 2022*; 2:00 pm, ESPN+		Siena	W 69–59	4–1	Lavietes Pavilion (1,142); Boston, MA
November 25, 2022*; 2:00 pm, ESPN+		Loyola–Chicago	W 61–55	5–1	Lavietes Pavilion (1,138); Boston, MA
November 27, 2022*; 1:30 pm, ESPN+/SNY		at Fordham	L 60–68	5–2	Rose Hill Gymnasium; Bronx, NY
November 30, 2022*; 7:00 pm, ESPN+		at Holy Cross	W 72–38	6–2	Hart Center (1,117); Worcester, MA
December 2, 2022*; 7:00 pm, ESPN+		UMass	L 68–71	6–3	Lavietes Pavilion (1,636); Boston, MA
December 4, 2022*; 2:00 pm, ESPN+		Tufts	W 76–59	7–3	Lavietes Pavilion (1,017); Boston, MA
December 18, 2022*; 12:00 pm, ESPN+		Howard	L 54–66	7–4	Lavietes Pavilion (1,473); Boston, MA
December 20, 2022*; 10:00 pm, ESPN+		at UC Irvine	W 62–57	8–4	Bren Events Center (2,466); Irvine, CA
December 22, 2022*; 7:00 pm, ESPN2		at No. 4 Kansas	L 54–68	8–5	Allen Fieldhouse (16,300); Lawrence, KS
December 28, 2022*; 7:00 pm, ESPN+		at Maine	W 74–73 ^{OT}	9–5	Cross Insurance Center (994); Bangor, ME
Ivy League regular season
December 31, 2022; 1:00 pm, ESPN+		at Princeton	L 66–69	9–6 (0–1)	Jadwin Gymnasium (2,866); Princeton, NJ
January 6, 2023; 7:00 pm, ESPN+		at Brown	W 70–68	10–6 (1–1)	Pizzitola Sports Center (852); Providence, RI
January 7, 2023; 7:00 pm, ESPN+		at Yale	L 54–58	10–7 (1–2)	John J. Lee Amphitheater (1,894); New Haven, CT
January 14, 2023; 1:00 pm, ESPN+/NESN		Columbia	W 73–51	11–7 (2–2)	Lavietes Pavilion (1,288); Boston, MA
January 16, 2023; 2:00 pm, ESPN+		Dartmouth	L 59–60	11–8 (2–3)	Lavietes Pavilion (1,486); Boston, MA
January 21, 2023; 2:00 pm, ESPN+		Cornell	W 95–89	12–8 (3–3)	Lavietes Pavilion (1,636); Boston, MA
January 28, 2023; 2:00 pm, ESPN+		at Penn	L 68–83	12–9 (3–4)	The Palestra (3,408); Philadelphia, PA
February 3, 2023; 5:00 pm, ESPNU		Yale	L 57–68	12–10 (3–5)	Lavietes Pavilion (1,636); Boston, MA
February 4, 2023; 6:00 pm, ESPN+/NESN		Brown	L 65–68	12–11 (3–6)	Lavietes Pavilion (1,582); Boston, MA
February 11, 2023; 2:00 pm, ESPN+		Penn	L 72–80	12–12 (3–7)	Lavietes Pavilion (1,636); Boston, MA
February 17, 2023; 7:00 pm, ESPN+		at Columbia	W 83–65	13–12 (4–7)	Levien Gymnasium (1,957); New York, NY
February 18, 2023; 6:00 pm, ESPN+		at Cornell	W 73–56	14–12 (5–7)	Newman Arena (1,112); Ithaca, NY
February 25, 2023; 2:00 pm, ESPN+		Princeton	L 56–58	14–13 (5–8)	Lavietes Pavilion (1,636); Boston, MA
March 4, 2023; 2:00 pm, ESPN+		at Dartmouth	L 82–87	14–14 (5–9)	Leede Arena (884); Hanover, NH
*Non-conference game. ^{#}Rankings from AP Poll. (#) Tournament seedings in parentheses. All times are in Eastern.
