= 2023 Ivy League men's basketball tournament =

American collegiate basketball tournament

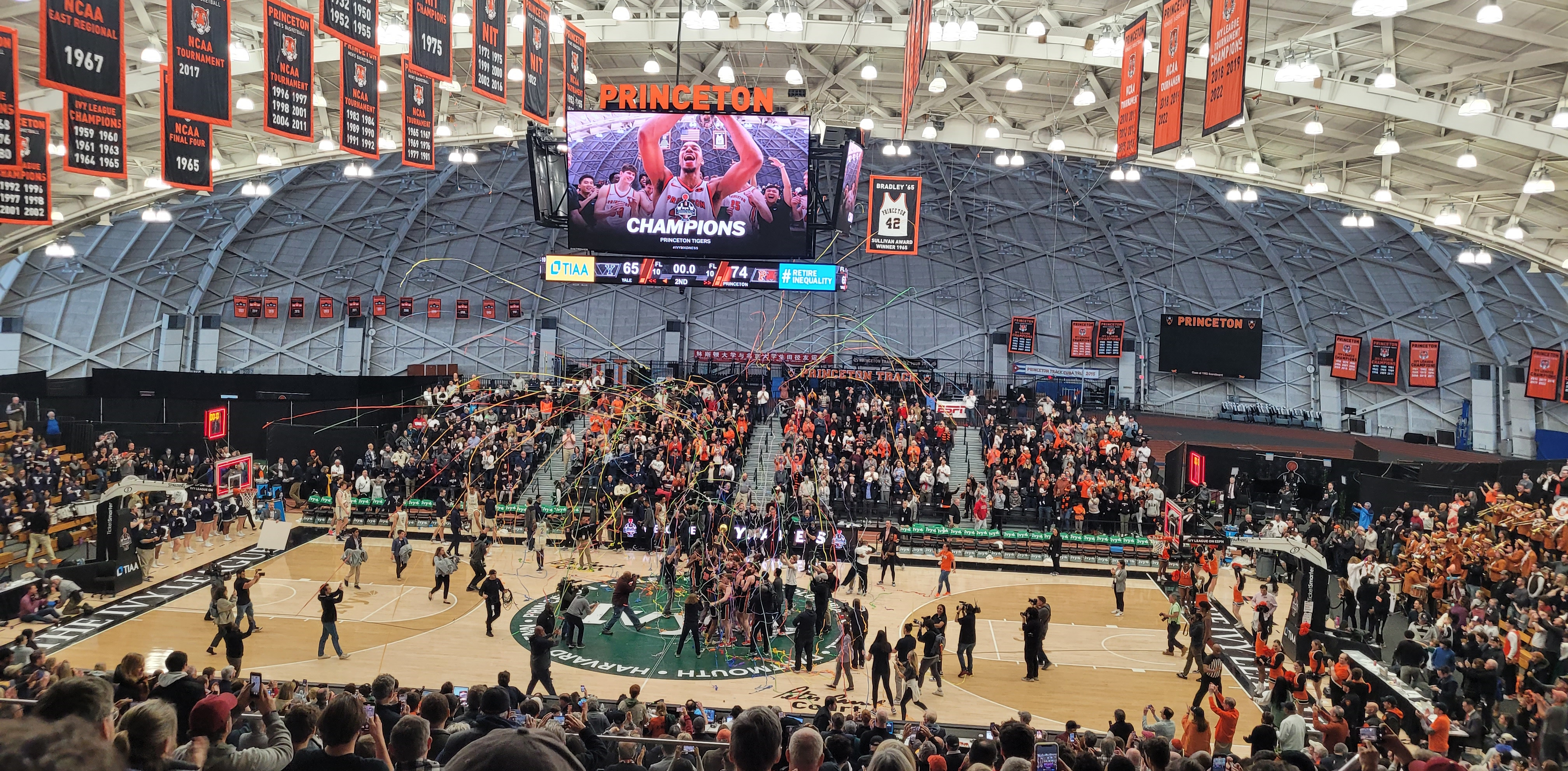
- Postgame celebration after Princeton won the title
- Classification: Division I
- Season: 2022–23
- Teams: 4
- Site: Jadwin Gymnasium; Princeton, NJ
- Champions: Princeton (2nd title)
- Winning coach: Mitch Henderson (2nd title)
- MVP: Tosan Evbuomwan (Princeton)
- Attendance: 12,276
- Television: ESPNU, ESPN2

The 2023 Ivy League men's basketball tournament, popularly referred to as "Ivy Madness", was the postseason men's basketball tournament for the Ivy League of the 2022–23 NCAA Division I men's basketball season. It was held on March 11 and 12, 2023, at the Jadwin Gymnasium on the campus of Princeton University in Princeton, New Jersey. The winner, the Princeton Tigers, received the Ivy League's automatic bid to the 2023 NCAA Tournament.

2022–23 Ivy League men's basketball standings
	Conf.				Overall
Team	W		L	PCT	W		L	PCT
Yale	10	–	4	.714	21	–	9	.700
Princeton †	10	–	4	.714	23	–	9	.719
Penn	9	–	5	.643	17	–	13	.567
Cornell	7	–	7	.500	17	–	11	.607
Brown	7	–	7	.500	14	–	13	.519
Dartmouth	6	–	8	.429	10	–	18	.357
Harvard	5	–	9	.357	14	–	14	.500
Columbia	2	–	12	.143	7	–	22	.241
† 2023 Ivy League tournament winner

== Seeds ==
The top four teams in the Ivy League regular-season standings qualify for the tournament and are seeded according to their records in conference play, resulting in a Shaughnessy playoff. If a tie for any of the top four positions exists, tiebreakers are applied in the following order:

- Head-to-head record between teams involved in the tie.
- Record against the top team(s) not involved in the tie in order of conference record, going down through the seedings until the tie is broken.
- Average of the teams' ranking in the following computer systems: NCAA NET, Sagarin, KenPom, and ESPN Basketball Percentage Index.

Seed	School	Record	Tiebreaker
1	Yale	10–4	2–0 vs Princeton
2	Princeton	10–4	0–2 vs Yale
3	Penn	9–5	
4	Cornell	7–7	1–1 vs Yale
DNQ	Brown	7–7	0–2 vs Yale
DNQ	Dartmouth	6–8	
DNQ	Harvard	5–9	
DNQ	Columbia	2–12	

== Schedule ==
Session	Game	Time	Matchup	Score	Television	Attendance
Semifinals – Saturday, March 11
1	1	11:00 am	No. 1 Yale vs. No. 4 Cornell	80–60	ESPNU	4,160
1	2	1:30 pm	No. 2 Princeton vs. No. 3 Penn	77–70	ESPNU	4,509
Championship – Sunday, March 12
2	3	12:00 pm	No. 1 Yale vs. No. 2 Princeton	65–74	ESPN2	3,607
Game times in Eastern Time. Rankings denote tournament seeding.

== Bracket ==
Semifinals; Saturday, March 11; ESPNU
1	Yale	80
4	Cornell	60
2	Princeton	77
3	Penn	70

Championship; Sunday, March 12; ESPN2
1	Yale	65
2	Princeton	74

== See also ==
- 2023 Ivy League women's basketball tournament
