= 2022–23 Princeton Tigers men's basketball team =

American college basketball season

2022–23 Princeton Tigers men's basketball

Ivy League regular season co-champions Ivy League Tournament champions

NCAA tournament, Sweet Sixteen
- Conference: Ivy League
- Record: 23–9 (10–4 Ivy)
- Head coach: Mitch Henderson (11th season)
- Associate head coach: Brett MacConnell
- Assistant coaches: Skye Ettin; Lawrence Rowley
- Home arena: Jadwin Gymnasium

2022–23 Ivy League men's basketball standings
	Conf.				Overall
Team	W		L	PCT	W		L	PCT
Yale	10	–	4	.714	21	–	9	.700
Princeton †	10	–	4	.714	23	–	9	.719
Penn	9	–	5	.643	17	–	13	.567
Cornell	7	–	7	.500	17	–	11	.607
Brown	7	–	7	.500	14	–	13	.519
Dartmouth	6	–	8	.429	10	–	18	.357
Harvard	5	–	9	.357	14	–	14	.500
Columbia	2	–	12	.143	7	–	22	.241
† 2023 Ivy League tournament winner

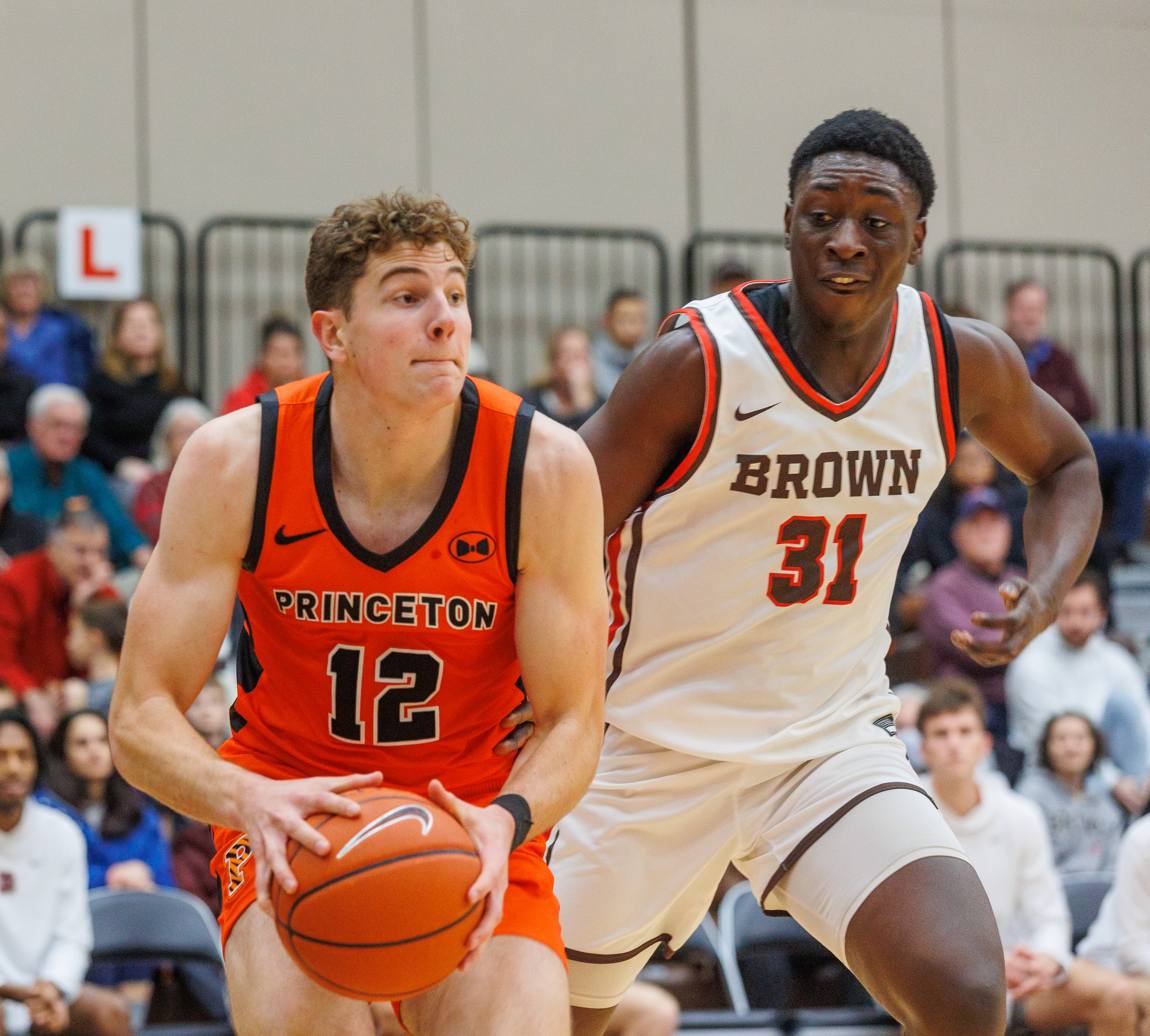
Princeton's Caden Pierce and Brown's Nana Owusu-Anane

The 2022–23 Princeton Tigers men's basketball team represented Princeton University in the 2022–23 NCAA Division I men's basketball season. The Tigers, led by 11th-year head coach Mitch Henderson, played their home games at Jadwin Gymnasium in Princeton, New Jersey as members of the Ivy League.

The Tigers defeated No. 2 seed Arizona to become the eleventh No. 15 seed to upset a No. 2 seed in the Tournament's history. They then defeated No. 7 seed Missouri to become the fourth No. 15 seed to advance to the Sweet Sixteen, making it three consecutive years a No. 15 seed has accomplished the feat. Princeton's Cinderella run came to an end with a 75–86 loss to Creighton in the Sweet Sixteen, marking the Tigers' farthest advance in the NCAA Tournament since 1967.

== Previous season ==
The Tigers finished the 2021–22 season 23–7, 12–2 in Ivy League play to finish as Ivy League regular season champions. They defeated Cornell in the semifinals of the Ivy League tournament before losing to Yale in the championship game. As a regular season champion who failed to win their conference tournament, the Tigers received an automatic bid to the National Invitation Tournament. There they lost to VCU in the first round.

== Roster ==
2022–23 Princeton Tigers men's basketball team
Players
Coaches

Pos.	#	Name	Height	Weight	Year	Hometown
G	0	Darius Gakwasi	6 ft 6 in (1.98 m)	208 lb (94 kg)	So	Portland, Oregon
F	2	Leyi Adebayo	6 ft 7 in (2.01 m)	207 lb (94 kg)	Jr	Melbourne, Australia
G	3	Ryan Langborg	6 ft 4 in (1.93 m)	196 lb (89 kg)	Sr	San Diego, California
G	4	Xaivian Lee	6 ft 3 in (1.91 m)	167 lb (76 kg)	Fr	Toronto, Canada
G	5	Jack Scott	6 ft 6 in (1.98 m)	197 lb (89 kg)	Fr	Denver, Colorado
G	11	Konrad Kiszka	6 ft 7 in (2.01 m)	205 lb (93 kg)	Sr	Newtown, Pennsylvania
F	12	Caden Pierce	6 ft 6 in (1.98 m)	210 lb (95 kg)	Fr	Glen Ellyn, Illinois
G	13	Deven Austin	6 ft 6 in (1.98 m)	180 lb (82 kg)	Fr	Vernon, Connecticut
G	14	Matt Allocco	6 ft 4 in (1.93 m)	193 lb (88 kg)	Jr	Hilliard, Ohio
F	20	Tosan Evbuomwan	6 ft 8 in (2.03 m)	219 lb (99 kg)	Sr	Newcastle, England
G	24	Blake Peters	6 ft 1 in (1.85 m)	190 lb (86 kg)	So	Evanston, Illinois
F	25	Jacob O'Connell	6 ft 11 in (2.11 m)	245 lb (111 kg)	Sr	Voorhees, New Jersey
F	32	Keeshawn Kellman	6 ft 9 in (2.06 m)	240 lb (109 kg)	Sr	Allentown, Pennsylvania
F	33	Vernon Collins	6 ft 10 in (2.08 m)	223 lb (101 kg)	Fr	Chocowinity, North Carolina
F	43	Philip Byriel	6 ft 9 in (2.06 m)	245 lb (111 kg)	So	Drums, Pennsylvania
F	54	Zach Martini	6 ft 7 in (2.01 m)	235 lb (107 kg)	Jr	Warren, New Jersey

Head coach

- Mitch Henderson (Princeton)

Assistant coach(es)

- Brett MacConnell (Rutgers)
- Skye Ettin (TCNJ)
- Lawrence Rowley (Emory)

Legend

- (C) Team captain
- (S) Suspended
- (I) Ineligible
- (W) Walk-on
- Injured
- Current redshirt

Roster
Last update: November 29, 2022

== Schedule and results ==
Date time, TV	Rank^{#}	Opponent^{#}	Result	Record	Site (attendance) city, state
Non-conference regular season
November 7, 2022*; 7:30 pm, ESPN+		Hofstra	L 77–83	0–1	Jadwin Gymnasium (1,112); Princeton, NJ
November 11, 2022*; 8:30 pm, CBSSN		at Navy; Veteran's Classic	L 73–74	0–2	Alumni Hall (2,889); Annapolis, MD
November 14, 2022*; 6:00 pm, ESPN+		at UMBC	W 94–64	1–2	Chesapeake Employers Insurance Arena (2,097); Catonsville, MD
November 19, 2022*; 7:00 pm, ESPN3		at Marist	W 62–55	2–2	McCann Arena (823); Poughkeepsie, NY
November 24, 2022*; 2:30 pm, Hoopsfix		vs. Army; London Basketball Classic	W 74–66	3–2	Copper Box Arena; London, England
November 26, 2022*; 12:00 pm, Hoopsfix		vs. Northeastern; London Basketball Classic	W 56–54	4–2	Copper Box Arena (2,074); London, England
November 30, 2022*; 7:00 pm, ESPN+		Cairn	W 92–58	5–2	Jadwin Gymnasium (742); Princeton, NJ
December 3, 2022*; 2:00 pm, FloHoops		at Drexel	W 83–63	6–2	Daskalakis Athletic Center (1,412); Philadelphia, PA
December 6, 2022*; 7:00 pm, ESPN+		Lafayette	W 69–58	7–2	Jadwin Gymnasium (920); Princeton, NJ
December 10, 2022*; 7:00 pm, ESPN+		Monmouth	W 91–54	8–2	Jadwin Gymnasium (1,372); Princeton, NJ
December 13, 2022*; 7:00 pm, SNY/ESPN+		vs. Iona	L 64–70	8–3	Harwood Arena (496); Union, NJ
December 16, 2022*; 7:00 pm, ESPN+		Delaware	L 69–76	8–4	Jadwin Gymnasium (1,599); Princeton, NJ
December 23, 2022*; 2:00 pm, ESPN+		Kean	W 88–70	9–4	Jadwin Gymnasium (832); Princeton, NJ
Ivy League regular season
December 31, 2022; 1:00 pm, ESPN+		Harvard	W 69–66	10–4 (1–0)	Jadwin Gymnasium (2,866); Princeton, NJ
January 6, 2022; 7:00 pm, ESPN+		at Columbia	W 68–49	11–4 (2–0)	Levien Gymnasium (1,027); New York, NY
January 7, 2023; 6:00 pm, ESPN+		at Cornell	W 75–68	12–4 (3–0)	Newman Arena (554); Ithaca, NY
January 14, 2023; 2:00 pm, ESPN+		at Brown	L 70–72	12–5 (3–1)	Pizzitola Sports Center (1,030); Providence, RI
January 16, 2023; 7:00 pm, ESPN+		at Penn; Rivalry	W 72–60	13–5 (4–1)	The Palestra (3,861); Philadelphia, PA
January 21, 2023; 2:00 pm, ESPN+		Dartmouth	W 93–90 ^{OT}	14–5 (5–1)	Jadwin Gymnasium (1,678); Princeton, NJ
January 28, 2023; 7:00 pm, ESPN+		at Yale	L 65–87	14–6 (5–2)	John J. Lee Amphitheater (2,041); New Haven, CT
February 3, 2023; 7:00 pm, ESPN+		Cornell	W 89–82	15–6 (6–2)	Jadwin Gymnasium (2,241); Princeton, NJ
February 4, 2023; 6:00 pm, ESPN+		Columbia	W 88–66	16–6 (7–2)	Jadwin Gymnasium (2,686); Princeton, NJ
February 11, 2023; 2:00 pm, ESPN+		at Dartmouth	L 76–83	16–7 (7–3)	Leede Arena (887); Hanover, NH
February 17, 2023; 7:00 pm, ESPN+		Brown	W 78–67	17–7 (8–3)	Jadwin Gymnasium (1,750); Princeton, NJ
February 18, 2023; 6:00 pm, ESPN+		Yale	L 83–93 ^{OT}	17–8 (8–4)	Jadwin Gymnasium (2,629); Princeton, NJ
February 25, 2023; 2:00 pm, ESPN+		at Harvard	W 58–56	18–8 (9–4)	Lavietes Pavilion (1,636); Cambridge, MA
March 4, 2023; 4:00 pm, ESPN+		Penn; Rivalry + Title Decider	W 77–69 ^{OT}	19–8 (10–4)	Jadwin Gymnasium (3,243); Princeton, NJ
Ivy League Tournament
March 11, 2023; 1:30pm, ESPNU	(2)	(3) Penn; Semifinals	W 77–70	20–8	Jadwin Gymnasium (4,509); Princeton, NJ
March 12, 2023; 12:00pm, ESPN2	(2)	(1) Yale; Championship	W 74–65	21–8	Jadwin Gymnasium (3,607); Princeton, NJ
NCAA tournament
March 16, 2023*; 4:10 pm, TNT	(15 S)	vs. (2 S) No. 8 Arizona; First Round	W 59–55	22–8	Golden 1 Center (14,896); Sacramento, CA
March 18, 2023*; 6:10 pm, TNT	(15 S)	vs. (7 S) No. 23 Missouri; Second Round	W 78–63	23–8	Golden 1 Center; Sacramento, CA
March 24, 2023*; 9:00 p.m., TBS	(15 S)	vs. (6 S) Creighton; Sweet Sixteen	L 75–86	23–9	KFC Yum! Center (20,289); Louisville, KY
*Non-conference game. ^{#}Rankings from AP Poll. (#) Tournament seedings in parentheses. S=South. All times are in Eastern.
