= 2022–23 Brown Bears men's basketball team =

American college basketball season

2022–23 Brown Bears men's basketball
- Conference: Ivy League
- Record: 14–13 (7–7 Ivy)
- Head coach: Mike Martin (10th season)
- Associate head coach: T. J. Sorrentine
- Assistant coaches: Tyson Wheeler; Sam Hershberger
- Home arena: Pizzitola Sports Center (Capacity: 2,800)

2022–23 Ivy League men's basketball standings
| | Conf. | | | | Overall |
| Team | W | | L | PCT | W | | L | PCT |
|---|---|---|---|---|---|---|---|---|
| Yale | 10 | – | 4 | .714 | 21 | – | 9 | .700 |
| Princeton † | 10 | – | 4 | .714 | 23 | – | 9 | .719 |
| Penn | 9 | – | 5 | .643 | 17 | – | 13 | .567 |
| Cornell | 7 | – | 7 | .500 | 17 | – | 11 | .607 |
| Brown | 7 | – | 7 | .500 | 14 | – | 13 | .519 |
| Dartmouth | 6 | – | 8 | .429 | 10 | – | 18 | .357 |
| Harvard | 5 | – | 9 | .357 | 14 | – | 14 | .500 |
| Columbia | 2 | – | 12 | .143 | 7 | – | 22 | .241 |
† 2023 Ivy League tournament winner

2022-2023

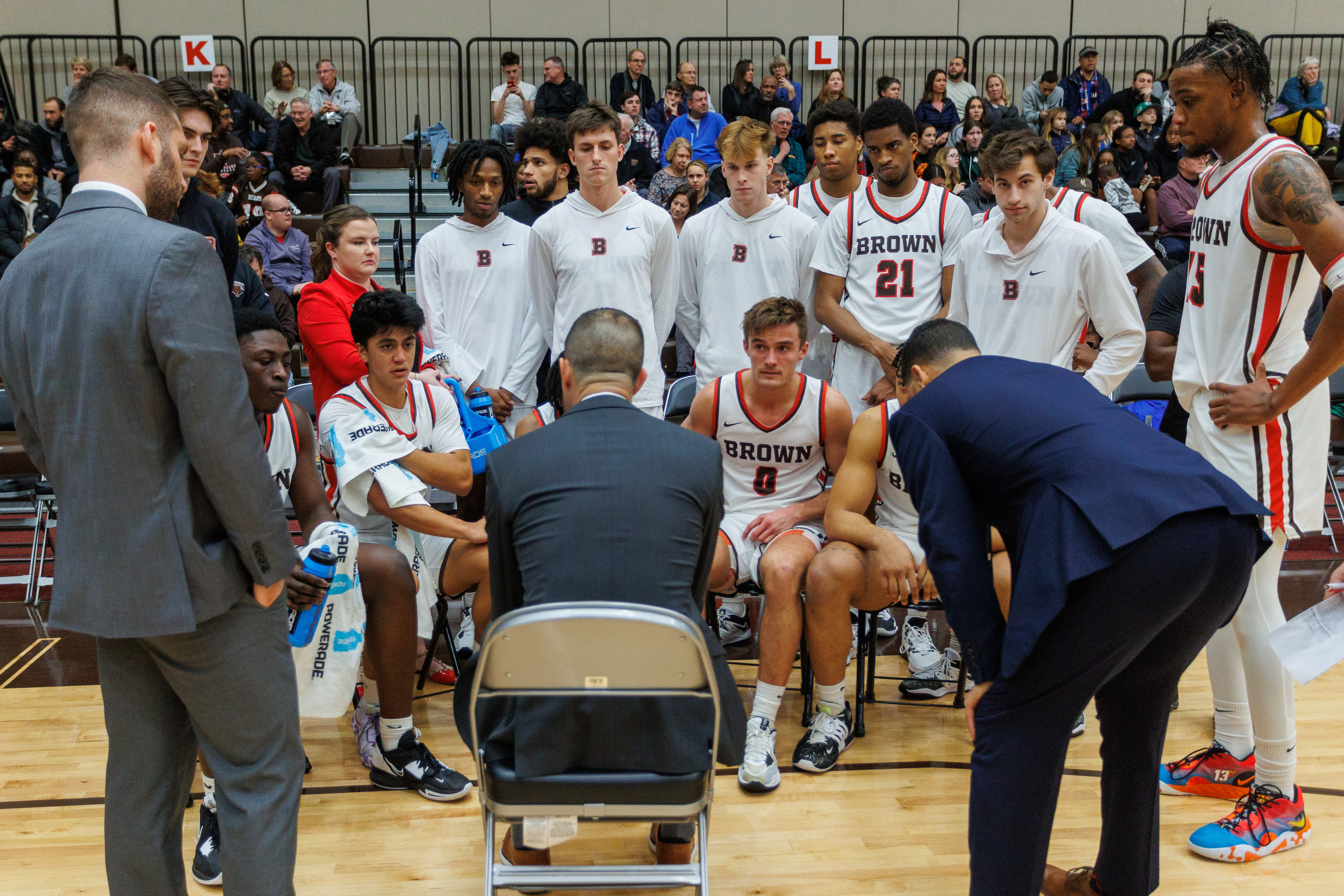
Team huddle

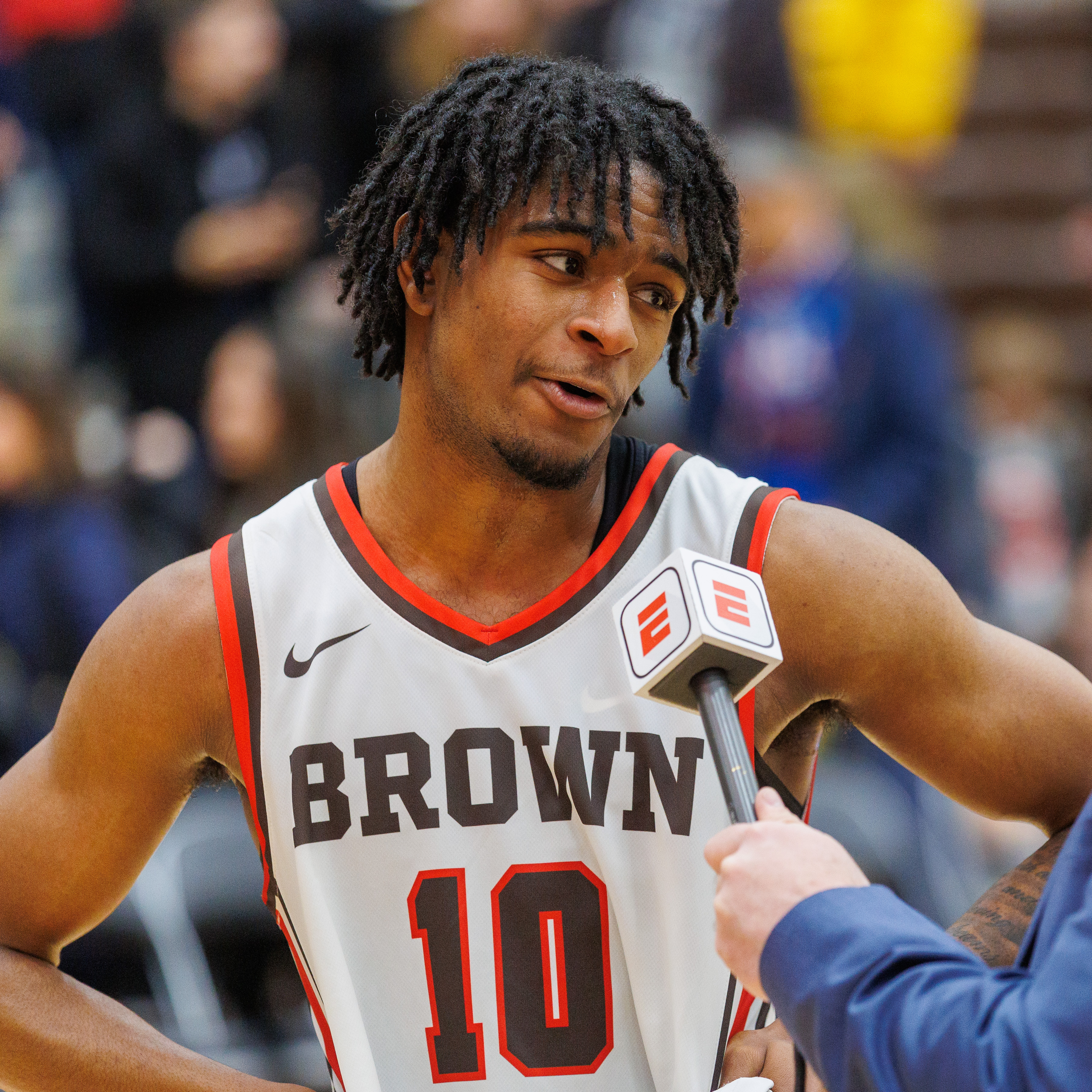
Kino Lilly Jr. scored 26 points against Princeton

The 2022–23 Brown Bears men's basketball team represented Brown University in the 2022–23 NCAA Division I men's basketball season. The Bears, led by 10th-year head coach Mike Martin, played their home games at the Pizzitola Sports Center in Providence, Rhode Island, as members of the Ivy League. They finished the season with a record of 14–13, 7–7 in Ivy League play, tying for fourth place. They failed to qualify for the Ivy League tournament.

== Previous season ==
The Bears finished the 2021–22 season 13–16, 5–9 in Ivy League play to finish in seventh place. Since only the top four teams qualify for the Ivy League tournament, they failed to qualify.

== Description ==
On February 11, Martin won his 134th game with the Bears, making him the "winningest" coach in the history of the Brown Bears basketball program.

== Roster ==
2022–23 Brown Bears men's basketball team
Players
Coaches

| Pos. | # | Name | Height | Weight | Year | Previous school | Hometown |
|---|---|---|---|---|---|---|---|
| G | 0 | Paxson Wojcik | 6 ft 5 in (1.96 m) | 205 lb (93 kg) | Sr | La Lumiere School | Charleston, South Carolina |
| G | 1 | Dan Friday | 6 ft 4 in (1.93 m) | 225 lb (102 kg) | Jr | University of Detroit Jesuit HS | Detroit, Michigan |
| G | 2 | Felix Kloman | 6 ft 5 in (1.96 m) | 190 lb (86 kg) | Jr | Pingree School | Ipswich, Massachusetts |
| G | 3 | Perry Cowan | 6 ft 4 in (1.93 m) | 205 lb (93 kg) | Sr | DePaul College Prep | Chicago, Illinois |
| G | 4 | Lyndel Erold | 6 ft 3 in (1.91 m) | 170 lb (77 kg) | So | Saint Sebastian's School | Boston, Massachusetts |
| G | 5 | Sam Klores | 6 ft 1 in (1.85 m) | 180 lb (82 kg) | So | Riverdale Country School | New York, New York |
| G | 10 | Kino Lilly Jr. | 6 ft 0 in (1.83 m) | 165 lb (75 kg) | So | Landon School | Glenn Dale, Maryland |
| F | 11 | Malachi Ndur | 6 ft 8 in (2.03 m) | 215 lb (98 kg) | Jr | Cushing Academy | St. Thomas, Ontario |
| F | 15 | Kalu Anya | 6 ft 8 in (2.03 m) | 215 lb (98 kg) | Fr | IMG Academy | Worcester, Massachusetts |
| G/F | 21 | Aaron Cooley | 6 ft 5 in (1.96 m) | 185 lb (84 kg) | So | Newton North HS | Roxbury, Massachusetts |
| F | 22 | Landon Lewis | 6 ft 7 in (2.01 m) | 215 lb (98 kg) | Fr | Harvard-Westlake School | Los Angeles, California |
| G | 23 | Kimo Ferrari | 6 ft 0 in (1.83 m) | 185 lb (84 kg) | Jr | Francis Parker School | San Diego, California |
| F | 24 | Drew Kania | 6 ft 8 in (2.03 m) | 215 lb (98 kg) | Fr | Gill St. Bernard's School | Chatham, New Jersey |
| F | 31 | Nana Owusu-Anane | 6 ft 8 in (2.03 m) | 220 lb (100 kg) | So | Putnam Science Academy | Burlington, Ontario |
| G | 33 | AJ Lesburt Jr. | 6 ft 5 in (1.96 m) | 197 lb (89 kg) | Fr | Bradford Christian Academy | Derry, New Hampshire |

Head coach

- Mike Martin (Brown)

Assistant coach(es)

- T. J. Sorrentine (Vermont)
- Tyson Wheeler (Fairfield)
- Sam Hershberger (Elon)

Legend

- (C) Team captain
- (S) Suspended
- (I) Ineligible
- (W) Walk-on
- Injured
- Current redshirt

Roster
Last update: November 29, 2022

== Schedule and results ==
| Date time, TV | Rank^{#} | Opponent^{#} | Result | Record | High points | High rebounds | High assists | Site (attendance) city, state |
Exhibition
| November 2, 2022*; 7:30 pm | | New Haven | W 74–66 | – | 19 – Wojcik | 10 – Owusu-Anane | 4 – 3 Tied | Pizzitola Sports Center (150); Providence, RI |
Non-conference regular season
| November 7, 2022*; 7:00 pm, ESPN+ | | at Vermont | L 65–80 | 0–1 | 18 – Lilly Jr. | 10 – Wojcik | 3 – Owusu-Anane | Patrick Gym (2,296); Burlington, VT |
| November 10, 2022*; 7:00 pm, ESPN+ | | Colgate | L 68–77 | 0–2 | 13 – Owusu-Anane | 7 – 2 Tied | 4 – Lilly Jr. | Pizzitola Sports Center (716); Providence, RI |
| November 13, 2022*; 5:00 pm, ESPN+ | | at Loyola (MD) | L 70–75 | 0–3 | 15 – Friday | 10 – Wojcik | 5 – 2 Tied | Reitz Arena (1,079); Baltimore, MD |
| November 17, 2022*; 7:00 pm, ESPN+ | | Stony Brook | W 64–53 | 1–3 | 19 – Lilly Jr. | 10 – Anya | 5 – Owusu-Anane | Pizzitola Sports Center (408); Providence, RI |
| November 23, 2022*; 7:00 pm, ESPN+ | | UMass Lowell | L 62–73 | 1–4 | 17 – Wojcik | 9 – Owusu-Anane | 4 – Anya | Pizzitola Sports Center (497); Providence, RI |
| November 27, 2022*; 2:00 pm, ESPN+ | | Maine | W 70–63 | 2–4 | 32 – Lilly Jr. | 10 – Anya | 5 – Cooley | Pizzitola Sports Center (490); Providence, RI |
| November 29, 2022*; 7:00 pm, NEC Front Row | | Central Connecticut | W 59–51 | 3–4 | 16 – Lily Jr. | 8 – Owusu-Anane | 3 – Ndur | Pizzitola Sports Center (843); Providence, RI |
| December 2, 2022*; 6:00 pm, ESPN+ | | at Bryant; Ocean State Cup | W 72–60 | 4–4 | 18 – Wojcik | 9 – Ndur | 5 – Lilly Jr. | Chace Athletic Center (1,585); Smithfield, RI |
| December 4, 2022*; 2:00 pm | | at Hartford | W 65–51 | 5–4 | 19 – Wojcik | 5 – 3 Tied | 6 – Wojcik | Chase Arena (319); West Hartford, CT |
| December 7, 2022*; 7:00 pm, ESPN+ | | at Rhode Island; Ocean State Cup | W 59–58 | 6–4 | 14 – Lilly Jr. | 14 – Anya | 4 – Anya | Ryan Center (4,476); Kingston, RI |
| December 10, 2022*; 4:30 pm, BTN | | at Michigan State | L 50–68 | 6–5 | 10 – 2 Tied | 13 – Wojcik | 4 – Wojcik | Breslin Center (14,797); East Lansing, MI |
| December 21, 2022*; 7:00 pm, ESPN+ | | New Hampshire | W 67–51 | 7–5 | 16 – Owusu-Anane | 9 – Anya | 4 – 2 Tied | Pizzitola Sports Center (548); Providence, RI |
| December 29, 2022*; 1:00 pm, BTN | | at Northwestern | L 58–63 | 7–6 | 17 – Lilly Jr. | 8 – Wojcik | 4 – Wojcik | Welsh–Ryan Arena (3,730); Evanston, IL |
Ivy League regular season
| January 2, 2023; 7:00 pm, ESPN+ | | Penn | L 68–76 | 7–7 (0–1) | 28 – Lilly Jr. | 16 – Owusu-Anane | 3 – Wojcik | Pizzitola Sports Center (740); Providence, RI |
| January 6, 2023; 7:00 pm, ESPN+ | | Harvard | L 68–70 ^{OT} | 7–8 (0–2) | 17 – Wojcik | 7 – Anya | 4 – Anya | Pizzitola Sports Center (852); Providence, RI |
| January 7, 2023; 6:00 pm, ESPN+ | | Dartmouth | W 77–70 | 8–8 (1–2) | 16 – Owusu-Anane | 10 – Owusu-Anane | 5 – Friday | Pizzitola Sports Center (691); Providence, RI |
| January 14, 2023; 2:00 pm, ESPN+ | | Princeton | W 72–70 | 9–8 (2–2) | 26 – Lilly Jr. | 8 – Owusu-Anane | 5 – Owusu-Anane | Pizzitola Sports Center (1,030); Providence, RI |
| January 16, 2023; 5:00 pm, ESPN+ | | at Yale | L 78–81 | 9–9 (2–3) | 25 – Lilly Jr. | 9 – Wojcik | 5 – Friday | John J. Lee Amphitheater (1,144); New Haven, CT |
| January 21, 2023; 4:00 pm, NESN/ESPN+ | | Columbia | W 97–85 | 10–9 (3–3) | 27 – Owusu-Anane | 18 – Owusu-Anane | 5 – Friday | Pizzitola Sports Center (907); Providence, RI |
| January 28, 2023; 2:00 pm, ESPN+ | | at Cornell | L 73–80 | 10–10 (3–4) | 22 – Wojcik | 12 – Owusu-Anane | 4 – 2 Tied | Newman Arena (2,216); Ithaca, NY |
| February 3, 2023; 6:00 pm, ESPN+ | | at Dartmouth | W 73–61 | 11–10 (4–4) | 23 – Lilly Jr. | 9 – 2 Tied | 6 – Wojcik | Leede Arena (667); Hanover, NH |
| February 4, 2023; 7:00 pm, ESPN+ | | at Harvard | W 68–65 | 12–10 (5–4) | 23 – Wojcik | 9 – Owusu-Anane | 3 – Friday | Lavietes Pavilion (1,582); Cambridge, MA |
| February 11, 2023; 2:00 pm, ESPN+ | | Cornell | W 80–66 | 13–10 (6–4) | 25 – Lilly Jr. | 11 – Wojcik | 7 – Friday | Pizzitola Sports Center (1,408); Providence, RI |
| February 17, 2023; 7:00 pm, ESPN+ | | at Princeton | L 67–78 | 13–11 (6–5) | 16 – Owusu-Anane | 11 – Owusu-Anane | 3 – Lilly Jr. | Jadwin Gymnasium (1,750); Princeton, NJ |
| February 18, 2023; 6:00 pm, ESPN+ | | at Penn | L 69–90 | 13–12 (6–6) | 24 – Wojcik | 15 – Owusu-Anane | 4 – Lilly Jr. | The Palestra (3,523); Philadelphia, PA |
| February 25, 2023; 2:00 pm, ESPN+ | | at Columbia | W 84–73 | 14–12 (7–6) | 23 – Lilly Jr. | 8 – Tied | 6 – Wojcik | Levien Gymnasium (1,310); New York, NY |
| March 4, 2023; 7:30 pm, ESPN+ | | Yale | L 75–84 | 14–13 (7–7) | 25 – Wojcik | 9 – Friday | 4 – Tied | Pizzitola Sports Center (2,003); Providence, RI |
*Non-conference game. ^{#}Rankings from AP Poll. (#) Tournament seedings in parentheses. All times are in Eastern.
