= 2022–23 Columbia Lions men's basketball team =

American college basketball season

2022–23 Columbia Lions men's basketball
- Conference: Ivy League
- Record: 7–22 (2–12 Ivy)
- Head coach: Jim Engles (6th season)
- Assistant coaches: Tobe Carberry; Jake Brown; Jesse Agel
- Home arena: Levien Gymnasium

2022–23 Ivy League men's basketball standings
	Conf.				Overall
Team	W		L	PCT	W		L	PCT
Yale	10	–	4	.714	21	–	9	.700
Princeton †	10	–	4	.714	23	–	9	.719
Penn	9	–	5	.643	17	–	13	.567
Cornell	7	–	7	.500	17	–	11	.607
Brown	7	–	7	.500	14	–	13	.519
Dartmouth	6	–	8	.429	10	–	18	.357
Harvard	5	–	9	.357	14	–	14	.500
Columbia	2	–	12	.143	7	–	22	.241
† 2023 Ivy League tournament winner

The 2022–23 Columbia Lions men's basketball team represented Columbia University in the 2022–23 NCAA Division I men's basketball season. The Lions, led by sixth-year head coach Jim Engles, played their home games at Levien Gymnasium in New York City, as members of the Ivy League. They finished the season 7–22, 2–12 in Ivy League play to finish in last place. They failed to qualify for the Ivy League tournament.

== Previous season ==
The Lions finished the 2021–22 season 4–22, 1–13 in Ivy League play to finish in last place. Since only the top four teams qualify for the Ivy League tournament, they failed to qualify.

== Roster ==
2022–23 Columbia Lions men's basketball team
Players
Coaches

Pos.	#	Name	Height	Weight	Year	Hometown
G	0	Jaden Cooper	6 ft 3 in (1.91 m)	175 lb (79 kg)	So	Goldsboro, North Carolina
G	1	Avery Brown	6 ft 4 in (1.93 m)	185 lb (84 kg)	Fr	Beacon Falls, Connecticut
G	2	Kenny Noland	6 ft 4 in (1.93 m)	185 lb (84 kg)	Fr	Apex, North Carolina
G	3	Zavian McLean	6 ft 4 in (1.93 m)	205 lb (93 kg)	Jr	Spring Lake, North Carolina
F	4	Liam Murphy	6 ft 7 in (2.01 m)	215 lb (98 kg)	Jr	Staten Island, New York
F	11	Josh Odunowo	6 ft 6 in (1.98 m)	205 lb (93 kg)	Jr	Laurel, Maryland
G/F	12	Cameron Shockley-Okeke	6 ft 6 in (1.98 m)	195 lb (88 kg)	Sr	Norwalk, Connecticut
F	13	Blair Thompson	6 ft 7 in (2.01 m)	190 lb (86 kg)	Fr	New York, New York
G	15	Geronimo Rubio De La Rosa	6 ft 2 in (1.88 m)	170 lb (77 kg)	So	Santiago, Dominican Republic
F	20	Robbie Stankard	6 ft 9 in (2.06 m)	240 lb (109 kg)	So	Westwood, Massachusetts
F	23	Zine Eddine Bedri	6 ft 10 in (2.08 m)	225 lb (102 kg)	Fr	Tébessa, Algeria
G	24	Lukas Yurasits	6 ft 2 in (1.88 m)	170 lb (77 kg)	Jr	New York, New York
F/C	34	Jake Tavroff	6 ft 9 in (2.06 m)	245 lb (111 kg)	So	Oceanside, New York
F	35	Noah Robledo	6 ft 5 in (1.96 m)	205 lb (93 kg)	So	Leander, Texas

Head coach

- Jim Engles (Dickinson)

Assistant coach(es)

- Tobe Carberry (Vermont)
- Jake Brown (Middlebury)
- Jesse Agel (Vermont)

Legend

- (C) Team captain
- (S) Suspended
- (I) Ineligible
- (W) Walk-on
- Injured
- Current redshirt

Roster
Last update: December 19, 2022

== Schedule and results ==
Date time, TV	Rank^{#}	Opponent^{#}	Result	Record	Site (attendance) city, state
Non-conference regular season
November 7, 2022*; 7:00 pm, BTN+		at Rutgers	L 35–75	0–1	Jersey Mike's Arena (8,000); Piscataway, NJ
November 10, 2022*; 7:00 pm, ESPN+		UMass Lowell	L 62–89	0–2	Levien Gymnasium (676); New York, NY
November 13, 2022*; 1:00 pm, NEC Front Row		at Sacred Heart	L 85–88	0–3	William H. Pitt Center (723); Fairfield, CT
November 16, 2022*; 7:00 pm, ESPN+		Delaware State	W 70–65	1–3	Levien Gymnasium (571); New York, NY
November 18, 2022*; 7:00 pm, ESPN3		at Maine	L 70–93	1–4	Memorial Gymnasium (889); Orono, ME
November 20, 2022*; 1:00 pm, ESPN+		SUNY Maritime	W 96–44	2–4	Levien Gymnasium (547); New York, NY
November 23, 2022*; 2:00 pm, ESPN+		at Binghamton	L 79–81	2–5	Binghamton University Events Center (1,243); Vestal, NY
November 26, 2022*; 4:00 pm, FS2		at Providence	L 64–78	2–6	Amica Mutual Pavilion (9,215); Providence, RI
November 28, 2022*; 7:00 pm, ESPN+		at Marist	L 39–52	2–7	McCann Arena (861); Poughkeepsie, NY
December 3, 2022*; 4:00 pm, ESPN+		New Hampshire	W 56–52	3–7	Levien Gymnasium (549); New York, NY
December 4, 2022*; 2:00 pm, ESPN+		Sarah Lawrence	W 106–65	4–7	Levien Gymnasium (503); New York, NY
December 6, 2022*; 7:00 pm, ESPN+		UMBC	L 66–73	4–8	Levien Gymnasium (560); New York, NY
December 9, 2022*; 7:00 pm, ESPN+		Fairleigh Dickinson	L 73–76 ^{OT}	4–9	Levien Gymnasium (527); New York, NY
December 12, 2022*; 7:00 pm, ESPN+		at Lafayette	W 57–45	5–9	Kirby Sports Center (1,267); Easton, PA
December 28, 2022*; 4:00 pm, ESPN+		Maryland Eastern Shore	L 67-74 ^{OT}	5–10	Levien Gymnasium (1,003); New York, NY
Ivy League regular season
December 31, 2022; 12:00 pm, ESPN+		Yale	W 62–60	6–10 (1–0)	Levien Gymnasium (1,011); New York, NY
January 6, 2023; 7:00 pm, ESPN+		Princeton	L 49–68	6–11 (1–1)	Levien Gymnasium (1,027); New York, NY
January 7, 2023; 7:00 pm, ESPN+		Penn	L 55–84	6–12 (1–2)	Levien Gymnasium (1,963); New York, NY
January 14, 2023; 1:00 pm, ESPN+		at Harvard	L 51–73	6–13 (1–3)	Lavietes Pavilion (1,288); Cambridge, MA
January 16, 2023; 12:00 pm, SNY/ESPN+		Cornell	L 85–102	6–14 (1–4)	Levien Gymnasium (1,653); New York, NY
January 21, 2023; 2:00 pm, ESPN+		at Brown	L 85–97	6–15 (1–5)	Pizzitola Sports Center (907); Providence, RI
January 28, 2023; 2:00 pm, ESPN+		at Dartmouth	L 73–83	6–16 (1–6)	Leede Arena (951); Hanover, NH
February 3, 2023; 7:00 pm, ESPN+		at Penn	L 65–74	6–17 (1–7)	The Palestra (1,423); Philadelphia, PA
February 4, 2023; 6:00 pm, SNY/ESPN+		at Princeton	L 66–88	6–18 (1–8)	Jadwin Gymnasium (2,686); Princeton, NJ
February 11, 2023; 7:00 pm, ESPN+		at Yale	L 68–99	6–19 (1–9)	John J. Lee Amphitheater (1,706); New Haven, CT
February 17, 2023; 7:00 pm, SNY/ESPN+		Harvard	L 65–83	6–20 (1–10)	Levien Gymnasium (1,957); New York, NY
February 18, 2023; 7:00 pm, ESPN+		Dartmouth	W 71–65	7–20 (2–10)	Levien Gymnasium (1,201); New York, NY
February 25, 2023; 2:00 pm, ESPN+		Brown	L 73–84	7–21 (2–11)	Levien Gymnasium (1,310); New York, NY
March 4, 2023; 2:00 pm, ESPN+		at Cornell	L 73–87	7–22 (2–12)	Newman Arena; Ithaca, NY
*Non-conference game. ^{#}Rankings from AP Poll. (#) Tournament seedings in parentheses. All times are in Eastern.

== See also ==
- 2022–23 Columbia Lions women's basketball team
