= 2022–23 Cornell Big Red men's basketball team =

American college basketball season

2022–23 Cornell Big Red men's basketball
- Conference: Ivy League
- Record: 17–11 (7–7 Ivy)
- Head coach: Brian Earl (6th season)
- Associate head coach: Jon Jaques
- Assistant coaches: Alex Mumphard; Max Ginsberg
- Home arena: Newman Arena

2022–23 Ivy League men's basketball standings
	Conf.				Overall
Team	W		L	PCT	W		L	PCT
Yale	10	–	4	.714	21	–	9	.700
Princeton †	10	–	4	.714	23	–	9	.719
Penn	9	–	5	.643	17	–	13	.567
Cornell	7	–	7	.500	17	–	11	.607
Brown	7	–	7	.500	14	–	13	.519
Dartmouth	6	–	8	.429	10	–	18	.357
Harvard	5	–	9	.357	14	–	14	.500
Columbia	2	–	12	.143	7	–	22	.241
† 2023 Ivy League tournament winner

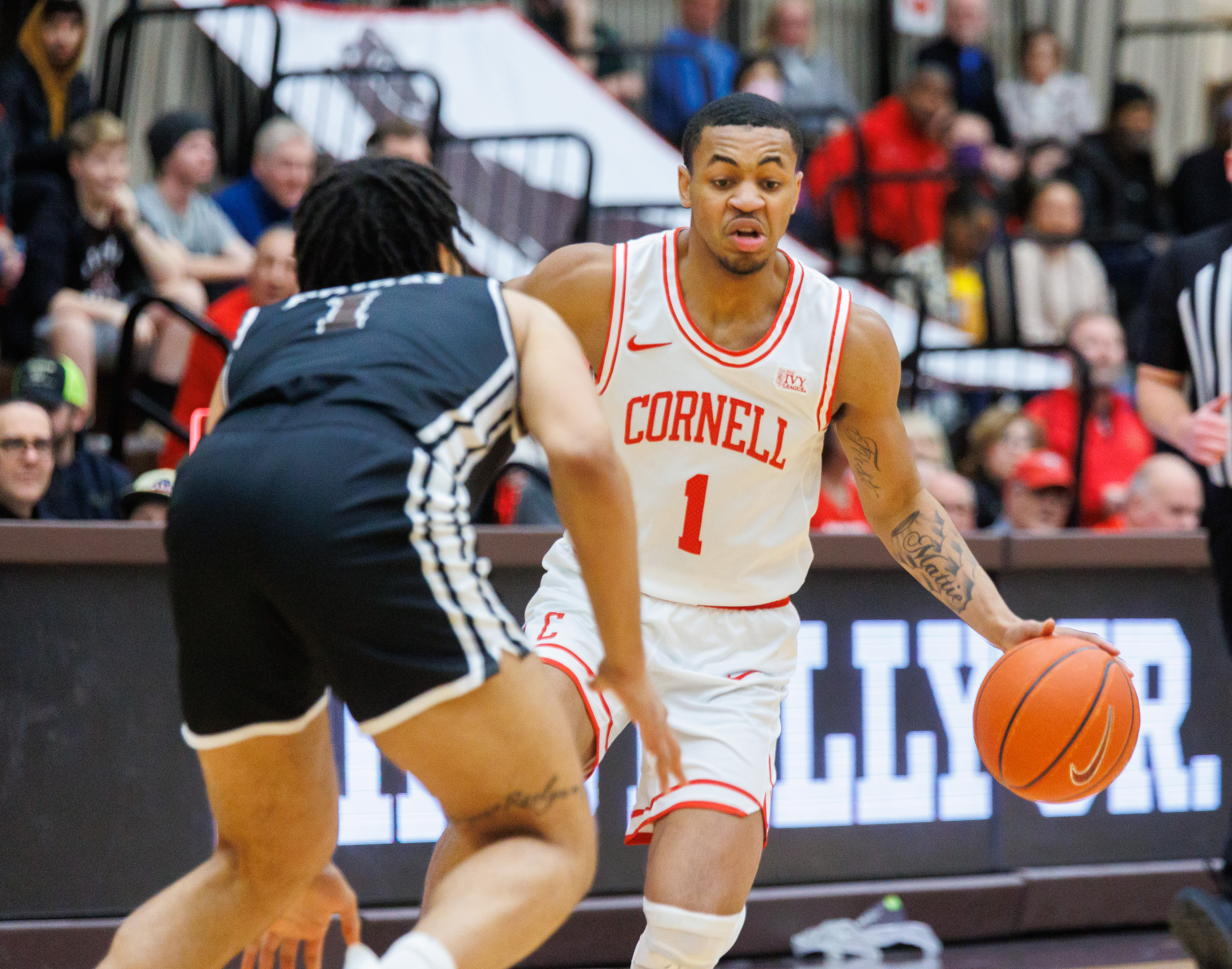
Cornell's Nazir Williams rushes past Brown's Dan Friday

The 2022–23 Cornell Big Red men's basketball team represented Cornell University in the 2022–23 NCAA Division I men's basketball season. The Big Red, led by sixth-year head coach Brian Earl, played their home games at Newman Arena in Ithaca, New York, as members of the Ivy League.

== Previous season ==
The Big Red finished the 2021–22 season 15–10, 7–7 in Ivy League play to finish in fourth place. They were defeated by Princeton in the semifinals of the Ivy League tournament.

== Roster ==
2022–23 Cornell Big Red men's basketball team
Players
Coaches

Pos.	#	Name	Height	Weight	Year	Hometown
F	0	Evan Williams	6 ft 7 in (2.01 m)	220 lb (100 kg)	Jr	Murphy, Texas
G	1	Nazir Williams	6 ft 3 in (1.91 m)	184 lb (83 kg)	So	Nyack, New York
F	2	Marcus Filien	6 ft 7 in (2.01 m)	214 lb (97 kg)	Sr	Rensselaer, New York
F/C	3	Ryan Kiachian	6 ft 10 in (2.08 m)	235 lb (107 kg)	So	Los Altos Hills, California
G	4	Greg Dolan	6 ft 3 in (1.91 m)	188 lb (85 kg)	Sr	Williamsville, New York
F	10	Chuks Uzoka	6 ft 6 in (1.98 m)	208 lb (94 kg)	Sr	Richmond, Texas
G	11	Adam Tsang Hinton	6 ft 5 in (1.96 m)	206 lb (93 kg)	Fr	Studio City, California
F	12	AK Okereke	6 ft 7 in (2.01 m)	215 lb (98 kg)	Fr	Clovis, California
G	13	Isaiah Gray	6 ft 3 in (1.91 m)	215 lb (98 kg)	Jr	Brooklyn, New York
G	14	Darius Ervin	5 ft 8 in (1.73 m)	162 lb (73 kg)	Jr	Brooklyn, New York
F	15	Keller Boothby	6 ft 7 in (2.01 m)	210 lb (95 kg)	Jr	Plano, Texas
F	20	Sean Hansen	6 ft 9 in (2.06 m)	250 lb (113 kg)	Jr	Ramsey, New Jersey
F	21	Guy Ragland Jr.	6 ft 8 in (2.03 m)	243 lb (110 kg)	So	West Hartford, Connecticut
F	23	DJ Nix	6 ft 6 in (1.98 m)	220 lb (100 kg)	Fr	Harrisburg, North Carolina
G	24	Josh Baldwin	6 ft 5 in (1.96 m)	233 lb (106 kg)	Fr	Everett, Massachusetts
G	25	Max Watson	6 ft 4 in (1.93 m)	195 lb (88 kg)	Jr	Brigham City, Utah
G	30	Chris Mañon	6 ft 5 in (1.96 m)	210 lb (95 kg)	Jr	New Milford, New Jersey
G	31	Cooper Noard	6 ft 2 in (1.88 m)	182 lb (83 kg)	Fr	Glenview, Illinois
F	33	Chris Cain	6 ft 8 in (2.03 m)	216 lb (98 kg)	So	Middletown, New York

Head coach

- Brian Earl (Princeton)

Assistant coach(es)

- Jon Jaques (Cornell)
- Alex Mumphard (Greenville)
- Max Ginsberg (Cornell)

Legend

- (C) Team captain
- (S) Suspended
- (I) Ineligible
- (W) Walk-on
- Injured
- Current redshirt

Roster
Last update: December 24, 2022

== Schedule and results ==
Date time, TV	Rank^{#}	Opponent^{#}	Result	Record	Site (attendance) city, state
Non-conference regular season
November 7, 2022*; 8:00 pm, ESPN+		at Boston College	L 77–79	0–1	Conte Forum (4,239); Chestnut Hill, MA
November 10, 2022*; 7:00 pm, ESPN+		SUNY Delhi	W 114–57	1–1	Newman Arena (822); Ithaca, NY
November 14, 2022*; 7:00 pm, NEC Front Row		at Saint Francis (PA)	W 80–77	2–1	DeGol Arena (758); Loretto, PA
November 18, 2022*; 7:00 pm, ESPN+		Ithaca College	W 83–61	3–1	Newman Arena (648); Ithaca, NY
November 22, 2022*; 5:00 pm, ESPN+		Canisius	W 79–70	4–1	Newman Arena (447); Ithaca, NY
November 25, 2022*; 2:00 pm, FloHoops		at Monmouth	W 81–63	5–1	OceanFirst Bank Center (1,526); West Long Branch, NJ
December 1, 2022*; 7:00 pm, FloHoops		at Delaware	W 74–67	6–1	Bob Carpenter Center (1,426); Newark, DE
December 4, 2022*; 1:00 pm, ESPN+		Lafayette	W 73–68	7–1	Newman Arena (448); Ithaca, NY
December 7, 2022*; 7:00 pm, BS/ACCNX		at Miami (FL)	L 105–107	7–2	Watsco Center (4,325); Coral Gables, FL
December 17, 2022*; 3:00 pm, ACCN		at Syracuse	L 63–78	7–3	JMA Wireless Dome (16,578); Syracuse, NY
December 20, 2022*; 5:00 pm, ESPN+		Lehigh	W 96–64	8–3	Newman Arena (517); Ithaca, NY
December 22, 2022*; 2:00 pm, ESPN+		at Colgate	W 91–80	9–3	Cotterell Court (733); Hamilton, NY
December 29, 2022*; 7:00 pm, ESPN+		Binghamton	W 86–70	10–3	Newman Arena (522); Ithaca, NY
Ivy League regular season
January 1, 2023; 2:00 pm, ESPN+		at Dartmouth	W 74–63	11–3 (1–0)	Leede Arena (645); Hanover, NH
January 6, 2023; 7:00 pm, ESPN+		Penn	W 88–69	12–3 (2–0)	Newman Arena (655); Ithaca, NY
January 7, 2023; 6:00 pm, ESPN+		Princeton	L 68–75	12–4 (2–1)	Newman Arena (554); Ithaca, NY
January 13, 2023; 5:00 pm, ESPNU		Yale	W 94–82	13–4 (3–1)	Newman Arena; Ithaca, NY
January 16, 2023; 2:00 pm, ESPN+		at Columbia	W 102–85	14–4 (4–1)	Levien Gymnasium (1,653); New York, NY
January 21, 2023; 2:00 pm, ESPN+		at Harvard	L 89–95	14–5 (4–2)	Lavietes Pavilion (1,636); Cambridge, MA
January 28, 2023; 2:00 pm, ESPN+		Brown	W 80–73	15–5 (5–2)	Newman Arena (2,216); Ithaca, NY
February 3, 2023; 7:00 pm, ESPN+		at Princeton	L 82–89	15–6 (5–3)	Jadwin Gymnasium (2,241); Princeton, NJ
February 4, 2023; 6:00 pm, ESPN+		at Penn	L 86–92	15–7 (5–4)	The Palestra (2,521); Philadelphia, PA
February 11, 2023; 2:00 pm, ESPN+		at Brown	L 66–80	15–8 (5–5)	Pizzitola Sports Center (1,408); Providence, RI
February 17, 2023; 6:00 pm, ESPN+		Dartmouth	W 95–83 ^{OT}	16–8 (6–5)	Newman Arena (877); Ithaca, NY
February 18, 2023; 6:00 pm, ESPN+		Harvard	L 56–73	16–9 (6–6)	Newman Arena (1,112); Ithaca, NY
February 25, 2023; 7:00 pm, ESPN+		at Yale	L 58–76	16–10 (6–7)	John J. Lee Amphitheater (1,920); New Haven, CT
March 4, 2023; 2:00 pm, ESPN+		Columbia	W 87–73	17–10 (7–7)	Newman Arena; Ithaca, NY
Ivy League Tournament
March 11, 2023; 11:00 am, ESPNU	(4)	vs. (1) Yale; Semifinals	L 60–80	17–11	Jadwin Gymnasium; Princeton, NJ
*Non-conference game. ^{#}Rankings from AP Poll. (#) Tournament seedings in parentheses. All times are in Eastern.
