= 2022–23 Yale Bulldogs men's basketball team =

American college basketball season

2022–23 Yale Bulldogs men's basketball

Outrigger Rainbow Classic champions

Ivy League regular season co–champions

NIT First Round
- Conference: Ivy League
- Record: 21–9 (10–4 Ivy)
- Head coach: James Jones (23rd season)
- Associate head coach: Matt Kingsley
- Assistant coaches: Justin Simon; Alington Paul
- Home arena: John J. Lee Amphitheater

2022–23 Ivy League men's basketball standings
	Conf.				Overall
Team	W		L	PCT	W		L	PCT
Yale	10	–	4	.714	21	–	9	.700
Princeton †	10	–	4	.714	23	–	9	.719
Penn	9	–	5	.643	17	–	13	.567
Cornell	7	–	7	.500	17	–	11	.607
Brown	7	–	7	.500	14	–	13	.519
Dartmouth	6	–	8	.429	10	–	18	.357
Harvard	5	–	9	.357	14	–	14	.500
Columbia	2	–	12	.143	7	–	22	.241
† 2023 Ivy League tournament winner

The 2022–23 Yale Bulldogs men's basketball team represented Yale University in the 2022–23 NCAA Division I men's basketball season. The Bulldogs, led by 23rd-year head coach James Jones, played their home games at John J. Lee Amphitheater in New Haven, Connecticut as members of the Ivy League. They finished the season 20–7, 10–4 to finish in a tie for 1st place. In the Ivy Tournament, they defeated Cornell in the semifinals before losing to Princeton in the Ivy Championship title. They received an automatic bid to the NIT, losing to Vanderbilt in the first round.

== Previous season ==
The Bulldogs finished the 2021–22 season 19–12, 11–3 in Ivy League play to finish in second place. They defeated Penn and Princeton to win the Ivy League Tournament and earn the conference's automatic bid into the 2022 NCAA Tournament. They received the #14 seed in the East Region and drew #3 seed Purdue in the First Round. They would go on to lose to the Boilermakers, 78–56.

== Roster ==
2022–23 Yale Bulldogs men's basketball team
Players
Coaches

Pos.	#	Name	Height	Weight	Year	Hometown
F	1	Danny Wolf	7 ft 0 in (2.13 m)	250 lb (113 kg)	Fr	Glencoe, Illinois
G	2	Bez Mbeng	6 ft 4 in (1.93 m)	195 lb (88 kg)	So	Potomac, Maryland
G	3	August Mahoney	6 ft 4 in (1.93 m)	190 lb (86 kg)	Jr	Saratoga Springs, New York
G	4	John Poulakidas	6 ft 5 in (1.96 m)	190 lb (86 kg)	So	Naperville, Illinois
G	10	Matthue Cotton	6 ft 5 in (1.96 m)	200 lb (91 kg)	Sr	Voorhees, New Jersey
G	11	Emir Buyukhanli	6 ft 5 in (1.96 m)	210 lb (95 kg)	So	Ankara, Turkey
G	12	Teo Rice	6 ft 2 in (1.88 m)	190 lb (86 kg)	So	Bethesda, Maryland
G	13	Michael Feinberg	6 ft 4 in (1.93 m)	195 lb (88 kg)	Sr	Hidden Hills, California
F	15	EJ Jarvis	6 ft 8 in (2.03 m)	220 lb (100 kg)	Sr	Washington, D.C.
F	21	Luke Kolaja	6 ft 8 in (2.03 m)	225 lb (102 kg)	So	Montclair, New Jersey
F	22	Matt Knowling	6 ft 6 in (1.98 m)	205 lb (93 kg)	Jr	Ellington, Connecticut
F	23	Yussif Basa-Ama	6 ft 8 in (2.03 m)	200 lb (91 kg)	Jr	Bolgatanga, Ghana
G	24	Yassine Gharram	6 ft 3 in (1.91 m)	185 lb (84 kg)	So	San Diego, California
F	33	Jack Molloy	6 ft 8 in (2.03 m)	225 lb (102 kg)	So	Greenwich, Connecticut
F	35	Isaiah Kelly	6 ft 7 in (2.01 m)	215 lb (98 kg)	Sr	Augusta, Georgia
F	42	Nick Townsend	6 ft 7 in (2.01 m)	225 lb (102 kg)	Fr	Chappaqua, New York
G	44	Devon Arlington	6 ft 3 in (1.91 m)	195 lb (88 kg)	Fr	San Marcos, California

Head coach

- James Jones (Albany)

Assistant coach(es)

- Matt Kingsley (Wesleyan)
- Justin Simon (Yale)
- Alington Paul (SUNY Delhi)

Legend

- (C) Team captain
- (S) Suspended
- (I) Ineligible
- (W) Walk-on
- Injured
- Current redshirt

Roster
Last update: November 16, 2022

== Schedule and results ==
Date time, TV	Rank^{#}	Opponent^{#}	Result	Record	Site (attendance) city, state
Non-conference regular season
November 7, 2022*; 7:00 pm, ESPN+		Sarah Lawrence	W 96–41	1–0	John J. Lee Amphitheater (695); New Haven, CT
November 11, 2022*; 9:30 pm, ESPN+		vs. Eastern Washington; Outrigger Rainbow Classic	W 74–60	2–0	Stan Sheriff Center; Honolulu, HI
November 13, 2022*; 7:30 pm, ESPN+		vs. Mississippi Valley State; Outrigger Rainbow Classic	W 80–51	3–0	Stan Sheriff Center; Honolulu, HI
November 15, 2022*; 12:00 am, ESPN+		at Hawaii; Outrigger Rainbow Classic Championship Game	W 62–59 ^{OT}	4–0	Stan Sheriff Center (4,421); Honolulu, HI
November 20, 2022*; 2:00 pm, ESPN+		John Jay	W 112–55	5–0	John J. Lee Amphitheater (602); New Haven, CT
November 22, 2022*; 7:00 pm, ESPN+		Vermont	W 73–44	6–0	John J. Lee Amphitheater (678); New Haven, CT
November 27, 2022*; 3:00 pm, P12N		at Colorado	L 62–65	6–1	CU Events Center (5,780); Boulder, CO
November 30, 2022*; 7:00 pm, ESPN+		Howard	W 86–40	7–1	John J. Lee Amphitheater (752); New Haven, CT
December 3, 2022*; 6:30 pm, SNY		at Stony Brook	W 77–72	8–1	Island Federal Arena (2,515); Stony Brook, NY
December 6, 2022*; 6:30 pm, FS1		at Butler	L 61–71	8–2	Hinkle Fieldhouse (7,042); Indianapolis, IN
December 10, 2022*; 1:00 pm, SECN		at No. 16 Kentucky	L 59–69	8–3	Rupp Arena (20,264); Lexington, KY
December 12, 2022*; 7:00 pm, ESPN+		at Fairfield	W 77–64	9–3	Leo D. Mahoney Arena (2,552); Fairfield, CT
December 22, 2022*; 7:00 pm, SNY/FloHoops		at Monmouth	W 76–44	10–3	OceanFirst Bank Center (1,296); West Long Branch, NJ
Ivy League regular season
December 31, 2022; 12:00 pm, ESPN+		at Columbia	L 60–62	10–4 (0–1)	Levien Gymnasium (1,011); New York, NY
January 6, 2023; 7:00 pm, ESPN+		Dartmouth	L 77–81	10–5 (0–2)	John J. Lee Amphitheater (662); New Haven, CT
January 7, 2023; 7:00 pm, ESPN+		Harvard	W 58–54	11–5 (1–2)	John J. Lee Amphitheater (1,894); New Haven, CT
January 13, 2023; 5:00 pm, ESPNU		at Cornell	L 82–94	11–6 (1–3)	Newman Arena; Ithaca, NY
January 16, 2023; 5:00 pm, ESPN+		Brown	W 81–78	12–6 (2–3)	John J. Lee Amphitheater (1,144); New Haven, CT
January 21, 2023; 6:00 pm, ESPN+/NESN		Penn	W 70–63	13–6 (3–3)	John J. Lee Amphitheater (1,922); New Haven, CT
January 28, 2023; 7:00 pm, ESPN+		Princeton	W 87–65	14–6 (4–3)	John J. Lee Amphitheater (2,041); New Haven, CT
February 3, 2023; 5:00 pm, ESPNU		at Harvard	W 68–57	15–6 (5–3)	Lavietes Pavilion (1,636); Cambridge, MA
February 4, 2023; 6:00 pm, ESPN+		at Dartmouth	W 72–53	16–6 (6–3)	Leede Arena (806); Hanover, NH
February 11, 2023; 7:00 pm, ESPN+		Columbia	W 99–68	17–6 (7–3)	John J. Lee Amphitheater (1,706); New Haven, CT
February 17, 2023; 7:00 pm, ESPNews		at Penn	L 64–66	17–7 (7–4)	The Palestra (2,685); Philadelphia, PA
February 18, 2023; 6:00 pm, ESPN+		at Princeton	W 93–83 ^{OT}	18–7 (8–4)	Jadwin Gymnasium (2,629); Princeton, NJ
February 25, 2023; 7:00 pm, ESPN+		Cornell	W 76–58	19–7 (9–4)	John J. Lee Amphitheater (1,920); New Haven, CT
March 4, 2023; 7:30 pm, ESPN+		at Brown	W 84–75	20–7 (10–4)	Pizzitola Sports Center (2,003); Providence, RI
Ivy League Tournament
March 11, 2023; 11:00 am, ESPNU	(1)	vs. (4) Cornell; Semifinals	W 80–60	21–7	Jadwin Gymnasium (4,160); Princeton, NJ
March 12, 2023; 12:00 pm, ESPN2	(1)	at (2) Princeton; Championship	L 65–74	21–8	Jadwin Gymnasium (3,607); Princeton, NJ
NIT
March 14, 2023; 9:00 pm, ESPNU		at (2) Vanderbilt; First round – Clemson bracket	L 62–71	21–9	Memorial Gymnasium (5,290); Nashville, TN
*Non-conference game. ^{#}Rankings from AP Poll. (#) Tournament seedings in parentheses. All times are in Eastern.
