= 2022–23 Northeast Conference men's basketball season =

- League: NCAA Division I
- Sport: Basketball
- Teams: 9
- TV partner(s): CBSSN, ESPN2, ESPNU, ESPN3, ESPN+, SNY, NEC Front Row

NBA Draft

Regular season
- First place: Merrimack
- Runners-up: Fairleigh Dickinson; Stonehill
- Season MVP: Josh Cohen (Saint Francis (PA)); Jordan Minor (Merrimack)
- Top scorer: Josh Cohen (Saint Francis (PA))

NEC tournament
- Champions: Merrimack
- Runners-up: Fairleigh Dickinson
- Finals MVP: Ziggy Reid (Merrimack)

Northeast Conference men's basketball seasons
- ← 2021–22 2023–24 →

2022–23 Northeast Conference men's basketball standings
	Conf.				Overall
Team	W		L	PCT	W		L	PCT
Merrimack*†	12	–	4	.750	18	–	16	.529
Fairleigh Dickinson^	10	–	6	.625	21	–	16	.568
Stonehill**	10	–	6	.625	14	–	17	.452
Saint Francis (PA)	9	–	7	.563	13	–	18	.419
Sacred Heart	8	–	8	.500	16	–	17	.485
Wagner	8	–	8	.500	15	–	13	.536
Central Connecticut	7	–	9	.438	10	–	22	.313
St. Francis Brooklyn	7	–	9	.438	14	–	16	.467
LIU	1	–	15	.063	3	–	26	.103
† 2023 NEC tournament winner: * ineligible for the 2023 NCAA tournament due to transition period; ** ineligible for both the 2023 NEC tournament and the 2023 NCAA tournament due to transition period; ^ received automatic bid for the 2023 NCAA tournament as conference tournament runner-up, due to Merrimack's ineligibility

The 2022–23 Northeast Conference men's basketball season began with practices in October 2022, followed by the start of the 2022–23 NCAA Division I men's basketball season in November. Conference play started in the last week of December and ended in March 2023.

The NEC tournament was held in March with the higher-seeded team hosting each game.

It was the last season for St. Francis Brooklyn, which announced on March 20, 2023, that it was discontinuing its entire athletic program after the 2022–23 school year.

== Changes from last season ==
Stonehill College joined the Northeast Conference from the Division II Northeast-10 Conference. It is not eligible for the NCAA tournament until the 2026–27 season when its four-year reclassification period ends.

Bryant left the conference and joined the America East Conference.

Mount St. Mary's left the conference and joined the Metro Atlantic Athletic Conference (MAAC).

On March 25, FDU fired head coach Greg Herenda. On May 3, FDU hired Division II St. Thomas Aquinas head coach Tobin Anderson as his replacement.

On April 12, Wagner head coach Bashir Mason left Wagner to take the open head coaching position at Saint Peter's. On April 21, Wagner hired Seton Hall assistant coach Donald Copeland as his replacement.

Effective for the 2022–23 academic year, NEC teams transitioning from Division II are eligible for the NEC tournament during their third and fourth years of the transition period. If a reclassifying institution wins the NEC tournament championship, the conference's automatic bid to the NCAA tournament goes to the NEC tournament runner up. The rule change results in Merrimack being eligible for the 2023 NEC tournament, since it is in its fourth transition year, and Stonehill being eligible for the 2025 NEC tournament, when it will be in its third transition year.

LIU fired Derek Kellogg on June 30. Former NBA player Rod Strickland, who had been the director of the NBA G League's professional development program focusing on the exhibition team NBA G League Ignite, was named the new head coach that day.

== Head coaches ==
Team	Head coach	Previous position	Year at school	Overall record	NEC record	NEC tournament championships
Central Connecticut	Patrick Sellers	Fairfield (asst.)	2	8–24	5–13	0
Fairleigh Dickinson	Tobin Anderson	St. Thomas Aquinas	1	0–0	0–0	0
LIU	Rod Strickland	NBA G League Ignite (program director)	1	0–0	0–0	0
Merrimack	Joe Gallo	Robert Morris (asst.)	7	104–70	33–21	0
Sacred Heart	Anthony Latina	Sacred Heart (asst.)	10	109–160	73–85	0
St. Francis Brooklyn	Glenn Braica	St. John's (asst.)	13	164–200	109–105	0
Saint Francis (PA)	Rob Krimmel	Saint Francis (PA) (asst.)	11	134–170	88–90	0
Stonehill	Chris Kraus	Stonehill (asst.)	10	130–99	0–0	0
Wagner	Donald Copeland	Seton Hall (asst.)	1	0–0	0–0	0

Notes:

- All records, appearances, titles, etc. are from time with current school only.
- Year at school includes 2022–23 season.
- Overall and NEC/NCAA records are from time at current school and are before the beginning of the 2022–23 season.
- Previous jobs are head coaching jobs unless otherwise noted.

== Preseason ==
=== Preseason coaches poll ===
Rank	Team
1.	Merrimack (6)
2.	Sacred Heart (2)
3.	Saint Francis (PA)
4.	Wagner (1)
5.	St. Francis Brooklyn
T6.	Central Connecticut
T6.	Fairleigh Dickinson
8.	LIU
9.	Stonehill

() first place votes

=== Preseason All-NEC team ===
Player	School
Josh Cohen, (R-Junior, Forward)	Saint Francis (PA)
Nico Galette, (Junior, Forward)	Sacred Heart
Rob Higgins, (Senior, Guard)	St. Francis Brooklyn
Jordan Minor, (Senior, Forward)	Merrimack
Nigel Scantlebury, (Senior, Guard)	Central Connecticut

== NEC regular season ==
=== Season notes ===
On November 7, 2022, the season's opening night, Wagner overcame a 15-point deficit with seven minutes remaining to win at Temple, 76–73, in overtime. A three-point basket by Jahbril Price-Noel with three seconds remaining in regulation tied the game and sent it to overtime. Rahmir Moore's basket in overtime gave the Seahawks the lead, and the game was secured by two free throws by Price-Noel. Junior guard Delonnie Hunt led Wagner with 19 points.

Stonehill used a 7–1 run to close its game at Army West Point and earn an 82–77 victory on November 12, the Skyhawks' first win as a Division I program. Isaiah Burnett's jump shot in the final minute put Stonehill in front, 77–76, and they hit their free throws down the stretch to put the game away. The Skyhawks shot 52.% from the field and were led by Andrew Sims, who shot 9 for 11 and added eight rebounds and two blocked shots. Burnett had 19 points for Stonehill, and Thatcher Stone added 15.

On November 13, Nico Galette took control in the final minute of Sacred Heart's game against Columbia to lead them to an 88–85 victory. Galette's layup put the Pioneers in front, 86–85. Galette then forced a turnover on Columbia's next possession and hit two free throws to give Sacred Heart their three-point winning margin. He finished with 14 points and eight rebounds, and Mike Sixsmith had a career-high 23 points on 9 for 14 shooting.

St. Francis Brooklyn played its final game at the Daniel Lynch '38 Gymnasium within the Generoso Pope Athletic Complex, affectionately known as The Pope, their home court since 1971, on November 19. The Terriers surrendered an 18–0 run to Saint Peter's in the first half but came back and found themselves trailing by only five points, 63–58, when a Josiah Harris jump shot cut the deficit to three with 1:34 to play. A blocked shot by Roy Clarke led to a transition basket by Di'Andre Howell-South, that reduced the Saint Peter's lead to a single point. After another defensive stop, Zion Bethea’s reverse layup put St. Francis Brooklyn ahead, 59–58, with 37 seconds to play. A pair of free throws by Larry Moreno gave the Terriers a three-point cushion, and the Peacocks missed two three-point shots attempts in the closing seconds. Harris had his second-consecutive double-double, scoring 16 points with 13 rebounds and four blocked shots. Moreno scored a season-high 19 points, 14 of those in the second half on 6-for-8 shooting from the field, and he was 5 for 5 from the line. Through the season's first two weeks, Harris led the NEC in defensive rebounding rate at 34.7%.

On November 19, Stonehill overcame an 11-point second-half deficit at the Tom Konchalski Classic at Fordham University to defeat Holy Cross, 81–79. After the Skyhawks had taken a three-point lead, the Crusaders tied the game at 79 with 11 seconds to play. With Stonehill out of time outs, Josh Mack brought the ball up the court, backed into position in the paint, and hit a contested hook shot that banked in with 2.1 seconds remaining to give Stonehill the win. Mack scored a season-high 10 points, and had four rebounds, two assists and a blocked shot. Through five games over the season's first two weeks, the Skyhawks led the NEC in field goal percentage at 49.5%, effective field goal percentage at 56.6%, and free throw percentage at 83.7%. They were second in three-point field goal percentage 38.1%.

On November 21, Josh Cohen of Saint Francis (PA) became the first NEC player to score 40 points against a non-conference Division I opponent since December 2012, in an 82–76 loss to Lehigh. In setting a new career high, Cohen shot 15 for 19 from the floor and 10 for 13 from the free-throw line. He also had nine rebounds, three assists and a blocked shot. It was the first 40-point game for a Red Flash player since February 1991.

Despite the Skyhawks losing two of their three games at the Tom Konchalski Classic, two Stonehill players, Andrew Sims and Isaiah Burnett, were named to the All-Tournament team.

On November 27, Jahbril Price-Noel scored 19 points off the bench to lead Wagner to a 62–57 road win at NJIT.

Through the season's first three and four weeks, Stonehill led NCAA Division I in free-throw shooting percentage.

On December 3, Fairleigh Dickinson went on a 12–1 run that started with just over seven minutes remaining to extend their lead in a tight game at St. Joseph's to 81–68, on their wat to a 97–80 victory. Grant Singleton and Demetre Roberts each scored a season-high 24 points for the Knights, combining to shoot 15 for 22 from the field, 8 for 12 from three-point range and 10 for 10 from the free-throw line. Ansley Almonor scored 19 points for Fairleigh Dickinson. The Knights shot 57.6% from the floor and hit 12 of their 24 three-point attempts.

Josh Mack hit a three-pointer from the left wing at the buzzer off a pass from Cole Bergen to give Stonehill a dramatic 69–66 victory at Binghamton on December 3. The Skyhawks had a four-point lead with 18 seconds to play, only to see Binghamton tie the game with only five seconds remaining. However, without any timeouts, Stonehill was able to push the ball up the floor for the game-winning shot. Andrew Sims led the Skyhawks with 22 points.

Saint Francis (PA) celebrated the 50th anniversary of the opening of the Maurice Stokes Athletic Center with an 88–58 victory over Division III Saint Vincent on December 8.

On December 11, Fairleigh Dickinson earned its third straight victory, when Sean Moore raced to the basket from the three-point line to grab an offensive rebound and score with two seconds remaining, giving the Knights a 73–71 win over NJIT. Moore matched his season high in the game with eight points and added six rebounds, two steals and a blocked shot. An alley-oop dunk by Fairleigh Dickinson's Jo'el Emanuel in the game was featured as the number 2 play of the day on ESPN's SportsCenter Top Ten.

Josh Cohen had his second 40-point game of the season in Saint Francis (PA)'s 90–66 loss at Hawai'i on December 11. He became the first Red Flash player to record multiple 40-point games in a season since Maurice Stokes in 1954–55.

Kellen Amos scored 20 points and shot 6 for 6 from three-point range to lead Central Connecticut to a 78–67 wire-to-wire win at Manhattan on December 16.

First-year head coach Rod Strickland faced off against his son, Terrell, who had eight points, eight assists and five steals in James Madison's 115–79 win over LIU on December 18. Marko Maletic had a game-high 32 points and hit six three-pointers for the Sharks.

Rob Higgins hit a three-point shot on December 22, against Division III Medgar Evers to reach 1,000 points for his career in St. Francis Brooklyn's 89–66 victory. Higgins had 10 points in the game and is the 34th Terrier and 246th NEC player to reach the milestone. Larry Moreno led St. Francis Brooklyn with 20 points and added five steals. Max Egner had his second career double-double with 10 points and 12 rebounds, and Di'Andre Howell South scored a career-high 16 points for the Terriers.

Conference play began in the last week of December, and seven of the nine teams in the conference suffered a loss before 2022 came to an end. Saint Francis (PA) won a pair of home games to start the conference season 2–0. The Red Flash lost a 17-point first-half lead against Central Connecticut on December 29, but turned the game back in their favor and won, 80–72. Saint Francis was 14 for 21 from three-point range in the game and got 20 points from freshman Landon Moore. Luke Ruggery shot a perfect 5 for 5 three-pointers for Saint Francis. Kellen Amos led the Blue Devils with 20 points.

On New Year's Eve, the Red Flash overcame a nine-point deficit to edge Stonehill, 73–72. Landon Moore scored all 15 of his points in the final 5:28, and Josh Cohen hit a pair of free throws with 4.6 seconds remaining to give Saint Francis a one-point lead. A potential game winner by Andrew Sims from the corner missed the mark. Isaiah Burnett had 25 points, seven rebounds and two steals for the Skyhawks.

Fairleigh Dickinson won its NEC opener on December 29, and beat Division III Centenary (NJ) two days later. The Knights found themselves trailing Merrimack by six at halftime. A strong second half led by Ansley Almonor's career highs in points with 25 and rebounds with nine coming off the bench gave Fairleigh Dickinson a 71–63 victory. Jordan Minor had 19 points, 10 rebounds, two steals and three blocked shots for the Warriors and became the first Merrimack player to reach 1,000 career points at the Division I level. Minor hit the milestone with a first-half dunk. Fairleigh Dickinson outrebounded Merrimack 42–26.

Andrew Sims recorded a double-double with 17 points and a career-high 10 rebounds in Stonehill's NEC debut on December 29. The Skyhawks used 10 first-half three-pointers to build a 51–29 lead at Sacred Heart and then held on for a 74–67 victory. Shamir Johnson led Stonehill with 18 points, and Nico Galette had 23 points, seven rebounds and three steals for the Pioneers.

After the first two weeks of conference play, Fairleigh Dickinson and Saint Francis (PA) were the only two unbeaten teams in the league, both with 3–0 records.

After a 76–57 victory at St. Francis Brooklyn on January 5, led by Ansley Almonor's 20 points and five rebounds, the Knights hit 14 of 28 three-point shots two days later, in a 101–89 win over LIU. Demetre Roberts led the way for Fairleigh Dickinson with 28 points. Marko Maletic had 29 points, shooting 8 for 11 from three-point range, and six rebounds for the Sharks.

On January 7, after a 5–0 run by Wagner had cut Saint Francis (PA)'s seven-point lead with less than eight minutes remaining, Josh Cohen responded with a jump shot that extended the margin back to four. Cohen scored nine of his game-high 27 points over the final eight minutes to lead the Red Flash to their first road win of the season, 68–63. Landon Moore had 15 points, including six straight free throws in the final 24 seconds, and grabbed a defensive rebound off a potential game-tying three pointer with three seconds remaining for the Red Flash. Cohen added seven rebounds to his point total and had a key steal with 40 seconds to go and Saint Francis leading by three. Delonnie Hunt led the Seahawks with 20 points and four assists.

Central Connecticut senior guard Nigel Scantlebury recorded his 250th career assist, becoming the 143rd player in NEC history to reach the milestone in the Blue Devils' 78–59 victory over LIU on January 5. Jay Rodgers was Central Connecticut's high scorer with 15 points in the game, and Marko Maletic paced the Sharks with 15.

Fairleigh Dickinson won a pair of road games during the third week of conference play and emerged as the NEC's only unbeaten team with a 5–0 record. On January 14, the Knights were led by Grant Singleton, who had 20 points in an 88–80 win at Central Connecticut. Nigel Scantlebury had a game-high 23 points for the Blue Devils and added five assists and three steals. Two days later, Fairleigh Dickinson got 21 points from Demetre Roberts, including 18 in the second half, in a 65–57 victory at Stonehill, the sixth straight win for the Knights. Isaiah Burnett had 20 points and eight rebounds for the Skyhawks. Stonehill senior forward scored his 1,000th career point in the game. The 5–0 start for Tobin Anderson was the best for any first-year head coach in NEC history.

Maxwell Land had 21 points and eight rebounds and became the 26th Saint Francis (PA) player to record 100 career three-point field goals in the Red Flash's 87–68 home win over LIU on January 14. Landon Moore had a game-high 21 points for Saint Francis. Marko Maletic led the Sharks with 20 points.

St. Francis Brooklyn ended their January 16 game at rival LIU with an 8–0 run to secure a 73–66 victory and complete a 3–0 week. The Terriers were led by Tedrick Wilcox Jr., who had 17 points and six rebounds. Quion Burns had a game-high 19 points and added nine rebounds and four steals for the Sharks.

After three weeks of conference play, home teams had just a 12–12 record.

On January 19, Josh Cohen was one of 50 Division I players named to the Oscar Robertson Trophy Midseason Watch List by the United States Basketball Writers Association. Cohen is believed to be the first NEC player ever to appear on the list.

Sacred Heart handed Fairleigh Dickinson its first conference loss of the season, 92–85, on January 20. Joey Reilly scored 29 points, including the Pioneers' last eight points during the final 1:11 of regulation, and added three steals to secure the road win. Demetre Roberts had 27 points and two steals, and Grant Singleton added 26 points for the Knights. Roberts and Singleton shot a combined 9 for 14 from three-point range. Sacred Heart shot 74.2% from the floor and scored 62 points in the second half.

While Fairleigh Dickinson was losing to Sacred Heart, Saint Francis (PA) was dominating St. Francis Brooklyn to pull into a tie for first place at 5–1. In the first half, the Red Flash had runs of 13–0 and 16–0 and then scored five unanswered points in the final 47 seconds before intermission to take a 46–21 lead. Led by Josh Cohen's 22 points and eight rebounds, the Red Flash shot 70.6% from three-point range and 60.4% overall. Zion Bethea had 15 points and four steals for the Terriers.

Fairleigh Dickinson responded to their first loss in conference play by racing to a 31–19 halftime lead in their January 22 home game against Stonehill. However, in a game the Skyhawks trailed by as many as 16 points, Shamir Johnson led the Stonehill comeback by scoring 20 of his 23 points in the second half, while hitting five of his seven three-point attempts and grabbing six rebounds. The Skyhawks shot 68.2% on their field goal attempts and hit seven of 10 three-pointers while scoring 52 second-half points to earn a 70–59 victory. Ansley Almonor had 22 points and six rebounds for the Knights who fell out of first place, a half game behind Saint Francis (PA), who were idle.

Through the fourth week of conference play, road teams had a record of 17–15 in league games.

Fairleigh Dickinson hosted Saint Francis (PA) on January 26, in a battle for first place in the NEC. The Knights went on a 15–5 run midway through the second half to build a lead and held on for an 87–82 victory to impr0ve to 6–2, one half game ahead of the Red Flash. Joe Munden Jr. had his first double-double of the season with a career-high 21 points, all in the second half, and 10 rebounds to lead Fairleigh Dickinson. Josh Cohen paced Saint Francis with 26 points, shooting 11 for 14 from the floor, and added seven rebounds, four assists and three blocked shots.

Two days later, Fairleigh Dickinson erased a 12-point second-half deficit by scoring 52 points after the break to earn a 78–71 road win at Merrimack. Grant Singleton matched his career high with 27 points, shooting 5 for 8 from three-point range, and added six assists and four steals to lead the Knights. Ziggy Reid paced the Warriors with 16 points and three steals.

Sophomore Rob Taylor II of the Wagner College men's basketball team was named the Northeast Conference (NEC) Player of the Week, the conference announced on Tuesday. Taylor had a big week, as the Seahawks earned home wins over CCSU and Sacred Heart. On Friday, the Brooklyn native scored 17 points on 7-11 shooting in the Seahawks 72-50 victory over the Blue Devils. Two days later, the athletic sophomore contributed 19 points and grabbed seven rebounds against the Pioneers, as Wagner extended its winning streak to three games with a 68-58 victory. Overall, Taylor converted on 74% of his shots throughout the two games. Since being inserted into head coach Donald Copeland's starting lineup five games ago, Taylor has scored in double figures four times. Apart from Taylor, junior Rahmir Moore earned NEC Prime Performer honors after scoring 19 points against Sacred Heart and adding eight points two days earlier against CCSU.

For the first time, the Pratt ARC, the temporary home court of St. Francis Brooklyn, was the site of the Battle of Brooklyn between the Terriers and the LIU Sharks on January 28. St. Francis built a 16-point halftime lead and secured a 71–59 victory and a sweep of the season series in the NEC's most intense rivalry. Redshirt freshman guard Zion Bethea scored 18 points and added six assists and three steals to earn the Lai-Lynch MVP award for the Terriers. R.J. Greene had a double-double for the Sharks with 17 points, 10 rebounds and seven assists.

The Sharks were coming off what would prove to be their only win of the season over a Division I opponent, a 74–70 victory at Sacred Heart on January 26. LIU trailed by as many as 14 points but used a 14–0 run to take a 62–54 lead with less than eight minutes to play. Andre Washington and Jake Cook each hit two three-pointers during the run, which was capped by a C.J. Delancy dunk. The Pioneers got as close as two points in the final minute, but a jump shot by Washington, who had 15 points, stretched the lead for the Sharks and secured the win. Delancy led the way for LIU with a career-high 18 points, shooting 7 for 9, and added nine rebounds. Nico Galette had a double-double for Sacred Heart with 17 points, 12 rebounds, six assists and three steals. Bryce Johnson got his 500th career rebound in the game for the Pioneers and had a double-double of his own with 16 points and 10 rebounds.

Wagner got 12 points each from Brandon Brown, Javier Ezquerra and Julian Brown to end their two-game losing streak and earn an 83–79 road win at Fairleigh Dickinson on February 4. Brown shot 5 for 6, including 2 for 3 from three-point range, and added eight rebounds. Joe Munden Jr. had 23 points and three steals for the Knights, who fell to 7–3 in league play. Demetre Roberts scored the 2,000th point of his college career in the game for Fairleigh Dickison, 1,585 of those points having come at Division II St. Thomas Aquinas.

Fairleigh Dickinson' loss opened the door for Stonehill, which won their third straight game, 65–59, at St. Francis Brooklyn to improve their conference record to 8–3 and move into first place in the NEC. Max Zegarowski scored 17 points, including the 1,000th point of his college career, and had seven rebounds for the Skyhawks. Tedrick Wilcox Jr. led the Terriers with 17 points and two steals.

Raheem Solomon scored his 1,000th career point in Sacred Heart's 78–65 home win over Central Connecticut on February 4. Nico Galette scored a game-high 22 points for the Pioneers. Andre Snoddy led the Blue Devils with 20 points and six rebounds.

First-place Stonehill traveled to Merrimack on February 9, for a key game between NEC contenders. The Warriors got 16 points and 10 rebounds from Jordan Minor and earned a 56–43 victory, leaving both teams with 8–4 conference records. Thatcher Stone scored 10 points for the Skyhawks.

While Stonehill and Merrimack were battling in North Andover, Fairleigh Dickinson was visiting LIU. The Knights had an 11-point lead with four minutes to play, but Tre' Wood scored five points and had three assists down the stretch to pull the Sharks within a single point. C.J. Delancy's jump shot from the elbow at the buzzer missed, and the Knights escaped with an 80–79 victory that gave them an 8–3 conference record and vaulted them back into first place. Wood finished the game with a career-high matching 18 points, shooting 7 for 12, with six rebounds, nine assists and three steals. Ansley Almonor led Fairleigh Dickinson with a game-high 21 points and collected six rebounds.

Saint Francis (PA) rallied from a 17-point deficit with 11 minutes to play and earned a 78–76 overtime win at home against Sacred Heart on February 9. The Red Flash were led by Josh Cohen's 27 points and 11 rebounds. Cohen scored 14 of his points in the second half and eight more in overtime. With the score tied at 76, Cohen bank shot from the high post provided the winning margin for Saint Francis. Nico Galette led the Pioneers with 18 points and eight rebounds.

Wagner overcame deficits of 19 points with 12 minutes to play and nine points with under three minutes remaining in a Thursday afternoon matinee to force overtime at St. Francis Brooklyn on February 9. However, the Terriers recovered when Di'Andre Howell-South took Roy Clarke's pass in the corner and hit a jump shot that broke a 62–62 tie with two seconds remaining in overtime and gave St. Francis the win. Josiah Harris led the Terriers with 20 points and 11 rebounds. Brandon Brown scored 16 points and had 10 rebounds and two steals for the Seahawks.

Stonehill got back on the winning track on February 11, against St. Francis Brooklyn. Andrew Sims scored 30 points and gathered seven rebounds to lead the Skyhawks to a 62–51 home win that improved Stonehill's conference record to 9–4. Josiah Harris had a double-double for the Terriers with 15 points and 10 rebounds.

Following Stonehill's early-afternoon tilt, Merrimack got 18 points from Ziggy Reid and 15 points, five assists and three steals from Javon Bennett in a 75–68 road win at Saint Francis (PA), which improved the Warriors' league record to 9–4. Josh Cohen led the Red Flash with 24 points, nine rebounds and six assists.

Fairleigh Dickinson hosted Central Connecticut on the evening of February 11, looking to win and remain in first place. The Blue Devils got 18 points from Nigel Scantlebury, 17 from Jay Rodgers and 15 from Kellen Amos and hit 26 of their 30 free-throw attempts to earn a 77–73 road win. Demetre Roberts led the Knights, who fell to 8–4 in the league, with a game-high 21 points and five assists. Grant Singleton scored his 1,500th career point in the game for Fairleigh Dickinson.

The Merrimack and Stonehill wins and the Fairleigh Dickinson loss on February 11, left the Warriors and Skyhawks tied for first place with the Knights a half game behind.

While Merrimack was winning a non-conference game at Hartford on February 16, Stonehill puts its share of first place on the line at home against LIU. The Skyhawks got 30 points and six rebounds from Max Zegarowski on their way to a 75–60 victory that put them alone atop the NEC standings with a 10–4 conference record. Tre' Wood led the Sharks with 20 points, five assists and two steals.

Sacred Heart dealt a blow to Fairleigh Dickinson's hopes for an NEC regular-season title by handing the Knights their second straight loss on February 16, 94–86, in overtime in Fairfield. Nico Galette hit three jump shots in the final minute of regulation, including what appeared to be the game winner with four seconds remaining for the Pioneers. However, Demetre Roberts went coast to coast for a game-tying layup at the buzzer. Galette's jump shot as the shot clock expired with 48 seconds remaining in overtime gave Sacred Heart a six-point lead and put the game away. Galette finished the game with 27 points and eight rebounds. Roberts had 27 points of his own for the Knights and added six rebounds and four assists.

Josh Cohen scored the 1,000th point of his career for Saint Francis (PA) in the Red Flash's 72–64 road win at St. Francis Brooklyn on February 16. Cohen lead the Red Flash in scoring with 21 points and added 12 rebounds. Zion Bethea had 20 points, six rebounds and three steals for the Terriers.

Central Connecticut hosted Stonehill on February 18, in a game that became a triple overtime thriller. With the game tied on the final possessions of regulation and each of the first two overtimes, all attempts to beat the buzzer came up empty. However, in the closing seconds of the third overtime, the Blue Devils had the ball and a two-point lead. Central Connecticut broke the Skyhawks' trap and Nigel Scantlebury found Tre Breland for a dunk with two seconds remaining that put the game away for the Blue Devils. Jay Rodgers scored a career-high 24 points for Central Connecticut, who hit all 15 of their free-throw attempts. Scantlebury played a career-high 41 minutes for the Blue Devils, scoring 10 points, all after halftime, and adding six rebounds and six assists. Andrew Sims scored 24 points and grabbed seven rebounds for the Skyhawks, who fell out of first place with the loss.

Stonehill's loss paved the way for Merrimack to assert control over the league's top spot with a 67–55 road win at Sacred Heart. Devon Savage led the Warriors with 21 points and six rebounds; he shot 7-for-9 from three-point range. Bryce Johnson had a double-double for the Pioneers with 11 points, 11 rebounds and three steals. Merrimack improved their conference record to 10–4 with the win.

Andre Washington had the highest scoring game of the season by an NEC player with 37 points for LIU in the Sharks' 93–82 home loss against Saint Francis (Pa.) on February 18. Maxwell Land led the Red Flash with 21 points, and Josh Cohen added 16 points, seven rebounds and five assists.

Merrimack clinched the NEC regular-season championship and top seed in the NEC tournament with a 70–54 home win over Central Connecticut on February 23. Jordan Minor led the Warriors with 19 points, 12 rebounds, three assists, two blocks and two steals; it was Minor's league-leading 13th double-double of the season. Merrimack also got 15 points from Devon Savage, 14 points from Javon Bennett, and 13 points, five rebounds and five assists from Ziggy Reid. Jayden Brown had 13 points, nine rebounds and two blocks for the Blue Devils.

Fairleigh Dickinson secured the second seed in the NEC tournament with an 86–69 home win over St. Francis Brooklyn on February 25. Ansley Almonor led the Knights with 23 points, shooting 7-for-9 shooting, including 6-for-6 from three-point range. Sean Moore added 14 points for Fairleigh Dickinson. Di'Andre Howell-South had 18 points, six assists and four steals for the Terriers.

Fairleigh Dickinson's win over St. Francis Brooklyn locked Saint Francis (PA) into the third seed in the NEC tournament.

Sacred Heart claimed the fourth seed and home-court advantage for its NEC quarterfinal game with a 69–67 win at Central Connecticut. Sacred Heart and Wagner both finished with 8–8 records. Sacred Heart won the tiebreaker by virtue of its superior record (2–2) over Central Connecticut and St. Francis Brooklyn, which finished tied for seventh place in the league. Wagner was 1–3 against Central Connecticut and St. Francis Brooklyn. Joey Reilly led the Pioneers with 21 points in their clinching victory. The Blue Devils got 20 points from Nigel Scantlebury and 16 points and 12 rebounds from Andre Snoddy.

=== Player of the week ===
Throughout the regular season, the Northeast Conference named player(s) of the week and rookie(s) of the week.

Week	Player of the week	Rookie of the week
1 – November 14, 2022	Andrew Sims, STO	Landon Moore, SFPA
2 – November 21, 2022	Isaiah Burnett, STO	Landon Moore (2), SFPA
2 – November 21, 2022	Nico Galette, SHU	Landon Moore (2), SFPA
3 – November 28, 2022	Josh Cohen, SFPA	Keyontae Lewis, WAG
4 – December 5, 2022	Grant Singleton, FDU	Cam Gregory, SFPA
5 – December 12, 2022	Josh Cohen (2), SFPA	R.J. Greene, LIU
5 – December 12, 2022	Demetre Roberts, FDU	R.J. Greene, LIU
6 – December 19, 2022	Kellen Amos, CCSU	Landon Moore (3), SFPA
7 – December 26, 2022	DeLonnie Hunt, WAG	Landon Moore (4), SFPA
8 – January 2, 2023	Kellen Amos (2), CCSU	Landon Moore (5), SFPA
9 – January 9, 2023	Josh Cohen (3), SFPA	Landon Moore (6), SFPA
9 – January 9, 2023	Demetre Roberts (2), FDU	Landon Moore (6), SFPA
10 – January 18, 2023	Grant Singleton (2), FDU	Landon Moore (7), SFPA
10 – January 18, 2023	Tedrick Wilcox Jr., SFBK	Landon Moore (7), SFPA
11 – January 24, 2023	Rob Taylor II, WAG	Javon Bennett, MER
12 – January 30, 2023	Grant Singleton (3), FDU	Javon Bennett (2), MER
13 – February 6, 2023	Jordan Minor, MER	Javon Bennett (3), MER
14 – February 13, 2023	Josh Cohen (4), SFPA	Jordan Derkack, MER
14 – February 13, 2023	Josh Cohen (4), SFPA	Keyontae Lewis (2), WAG
15 – February 20, 2023	Jordan Minor (2), MER	R.J. Greene (2), LIU
16 – February 27, 2023	Josh Cohen (5), SFPA	Javon Bennett (4), MER

School	Player of the week awards	Rookie of the week awards
Central Connecticut	2	0
Fairleigh Dickinson	5	0
LIU	0	2
Merrimack	2	5
Sacred Heart	1	0
St. Francis Brooklyn	1	0
Saint Francis (PA)	5	8
Stonehill	2	0
Wagner	2	2

=== Against other conferences ===
Regular Season

NEC vs Power Conferences	Record
ACC	0–5
Big East	0–10
Big Ten	0–4
Big 12	0–0
Pac-12	0–1
SEC	0–0
NEC vs Power Conferences Total	0–20
Other NCAA Division I Conferences	Record
America East	5–12
American	1–1
ASUN	0–1
Atlantic 10	1–10
Big Sky	0–1
Big South	0–2
Big West	0–1
CAA	1–2
C-USA	0–0
Horizon League	0–1
Independents	8–2
Ivy League	3–2
MAAC	4–5
Mid-American	0–1
MEAC	2–0
MVC	0–4
MWC	0–0
OVC	0–1
Patriot League	3–9
SoCon	1–0
Southland	0–0
SWAC	0–0
Summit	0–3
Sun Belt	0–2
WAC	0–0
WCC	0–1
Other Division I Total	29–61
NCAA Division I Total	29–81
As of March 19, 2023.

Postseason

NEC vs Power Conferences	Record
ACC	0–0
Big East	0–0
Big Ten	1–0
Big 12	0–0
Pac-12	0–0
SEC	0–0
NEC vs Power Conferences Total	1–0
Other NCAA Division I Conferences	Record
America East	0–0
American	0–0
ASUN	0–0
Atlantic 10	0–0
Big Sky	0–0
Big South	0–0
Big West	0–0
CAA	0–0
C-USA	0–1
Horizon League	0–0
Independents	0–0
Ivy League	0–0
MAAC	0–0
Mid-American	0–0
MEAC	0–0
MVC	0–0
MWC	0–0
OVC	0–0
Patriot League	0–0
SoCon	0–0
Southland	0–0
SWAC	1–0
Summit	0–0
Sun Belt	0–0
WAC	0–0
WCC	0–0
Other Division I Total	1–1
NCAA Division I Total	2–1

=== Conference matrix ===
This table summarizes the head-to-head results between teams in conference play.

	CCSU	FDU	LIU	Merrimack	Sacred Heart	SFBK	SFU	Stonehill	Wagner
vs. Central Connecticut	–	1–1	0–2	2–0	2–0	1–1	1–1	1–1	1–1
vs. Fairleigh Dickinson	1–1	–	0–2	0–2	2–0	0–2	1–1	1–1	1–1
vs. LIU	2–0	2–0	–	2–0	1–1	2–0	2–0	2–0	2–0
vs. Merrimack	0–2	2–0	0–2	–	1–1	0–2	0–2	0–2	1–1
vs. Sacred Heart	0–2	0–2	1–1	1–1	–	2–0	1–1	2–0	1–1
vs. St. Francis Brooklyn	1–1	2–0	0–2	2–0	0–2	–	2–0	2–0	0–2
vs. Saint Francis (PA)	1–1	1–1	0–2	2–0	1–1	0–2	–	1–1	1–1
vs. Stonehill	1–1	1–1	0–2	2–0	0–2	0–2	1–1	–	1–1
vs. Wagner	1–1	1–1	0–2	1–1	1–1	2–0	1–1	1–1	–
Total	7–9	10–6	1–15	12–4	8–8	7–9	9–7	10–6	8–8

=== All-NEC honors and awards ===
At the conclusion of the regular season, the conference selects outstanding performers based on a poll of league coaches. Below are the results.

Honor	Recipient
Co-Players of the Year	Josh Cohen, SFPA
Co-Players of the Year	Jordan Minor, MER
Coach of the Year	Chris Kraus, STO
Defensive Player of the Year	Jordan Minor, MER
Rookie of the Year	Javon Bennett, MER
Most Improved Player of the Year	Ansley Almonor, FDU
All-NEC First Team	Josh Cohen, SFPA
All-NEC First Team	Nico Galette, SHU
All-NEC First Team	Jordan Minor, MER
All-NEC First Team	Demetre Roberts, FDU
All-NEC First Team	Andrew Sims, STO
All-NEC Second Team	Kellen Amos, CCSU
All-NEC Second Team	Isaiah Burnett, STO
All-NEC Second Team	Maxwell Land, SFPA
All-NEC Second Team	Ziggy Reid, MER
All-NEC Second Team	Grant Singleton, FDU
All-NEC Third Team	Ansley Almonor, FDU
All-NEC Third Team	Brandon Brown, WAG
All-NEC Third Team	DeLonnie Hunt, WAG
All-NEC Third Team	Joey Reilly, SHU
All-NEC Third Team	Max Zegarowski, STO
All-NEC Rookie Team	Javon Bennett, MER
All-NEC Rookie Team	Jordan Derkack, MER
All-NEC Rookie Team	R.J. Greene, LIU
All-NEC Rookie Team	Di'Andre Howell-South, SFBK
All-NEC Rookie Team	Landon Moore, SFPA

== Postseason ==
=== NEC tournament ===
Games were played between March 1 and 7, 2023, at campus sites. Merrimack won the tournament but was unable to represent the conference in the NCAA tournament, because it was still in transition from Division II. Instead, the conference's automatic bid to the tournament went to conference tournament runner-up, Fairleigh Dickinson. Ziggy Reid of Merrimack was named the tournament's MVP.

Teams were reseeded after each round with highest remaining seeds receiving home-court advantage.

Quarterfinals; Wednesday, March 1 ESPN3/NEC Front Row
1	Merrimack	91
8	LIU	76
3	Saint Francis (PA)	83
6	Central Connecticut	69
(Pairings are reseeded after the first round)
2	Fairleigh Dickinson	83
7	St. Francis Brooklyn	75
4	Sacred Heart	67
5	Wagner	55

Semifinals; Saturday, March 4 ESPN3/NEC Front Row
1	Merrimack	71
4	Sacred Heart	57
2	Fairleigh Dickinson#	70
3	Saint Francis (PA)	50

Championship; Tuesday, March 7 ESPN2
1	Merrimack	67
2	Fairleigh Dickinson	66

# Due to Merrimack's ineligibility, the semifinal between Saint Francis and Fairleigh Dickinson decided the NEC's automatic bid to the NCAA tournament.

=== NCAA tournament ===
Fairleigh Dickinson was the only NEC team to reach the postseason, representing the conference in the NCAA tournament. The Knights were ranked 68th (last) by the Selection Committee. Fairleigh Dickinson opened its tournament run with an 84–61 victory over Texas Southern at University of Dayton Arena in the First Four. The Knights used a 12–0 run to take an early 14–2 lead, which they never surrendered. Ansley Almonor led Fairleigh Dickinson with 23 points.

In the First Round, Fairleigh Dickinson earned a historic victory over Purdue, 63–58, at Nationwide Arena in Columbus, Ohio. The Knights, the smallest team in Division I college basketball, became just the second 16-seed to beat a 1-seed in the 152 all-time 1–16 matchups, and they accomplished the feat against the tallest team in Division I college basketball. Fairleigh Dickinson pressed for most of the game, holding Purdue to 35.8% shooting and forcing 16 turnovers, while committing only nine. The Knights were led by Sean Moore, who had 19 points. Zach Edey, the consensus national college player of the year, had 21 points and 15 rebounds for Purdue.

Fairleigh Dickinson's tournament run came to an end in a 78–70 loss to Florida Atlantic in Columbus. The Knights got 20 points from Demetre Roberts and 14 from Moore.

Seed	Region	School	First Four	1st round	2nd round
16	East	Fairleigh Dickinson	vs. (16) Texas Southern, W 84–61	vs. (1) Purdue, W 63–58	vs. (9) Florida Atlantic, L 70–78

== Media coverage ==
CBSSN televised four NEC games. ESPNU televised one game. SNY televised one regular-season game and both semifinal games of the conference tournament. ESPN3 simulcast a stream of the games that were televised by SNY along with three other games. Two regular-season games were streamed exclusively on ESPN+. ESPN2 televised the conference tournament final. All home games of NEC teams, other than those available on CBSSN, ESPNU, ESPN2 and ESPN+, were streamed by NEC Front Row, the conference's streaming platform.

== See also ==
- 2022–23 Northeast Conference women's basketball season
