= 2022–23 Merrimack Warriors men's basketball team =

American college basketball season

2022–23 Merrimack Warriors men's basketball

NEC regular-season and tournament champions
- Conference: Northeast Conference
- Record: 18–16 (12–4 NEC)
- Head coach: Joe Gallo (7th season)
- Assistant coaches: Micky Burtnyk (14th season); Phil Gaetano (5th season)
- Home arena: Hammel Court

2022–23 Northeast Conference men's basketball standings
	Conf.				Overall
Team	W		L	PCT	W		L	PCT
Merrimack*†	12	–	4	.750	18	–	16	.529
Fairleigh Dickinson^	10	–	6	.625	21	–	16	.568
Stonehill**	10	–	6	.625	14	–	17	.452
Saint Francis (PA)	9	–	7	.563	13	–	18	.419
Sacred Heart	8	–	8	.500	16	–	17	.485
Wagner	8	–	8	.500	15	–	13	.536
Central Connecticut	7	–	9	.438	10	–	22	.313
St. Francis Brooklyn	7	–	9	.438	14	–	16	.467
LIU	1	–	15	.063	3	–	26	.103
† 2023 NEC tournament winner: * ineligible for the 2023 NCAA tournament due to transition period; ** ineligible for both the 2023 NEC tournament and the 2023 NCAA tournament due to transition period; ^ received automatic bid for the 2023 NCAA tournament as conference tournament runner-up, due to Merrimack's ineligibility

The 2022–23 Merrimack Warriors men's basketball team represented Merrimack College in the 2022–23 NCAA Division I men's basketball season. The Warriors, led by seventh-year head coach Joe Gallo, played their home games at Hammel Court in North Andover, Massachusetts as members of the Northeast Conference (NEC).

The season marked Merrimack's final year of a four-year transition period from Division II to Division I. As a result, the Warriors were not eligible to play in the NCAA tournament. However, a rule change made by the Northeast Conference allowed the Warriors to compete in the NEC tournament.

They finished the season 15–16, 12–4 in NEC play, to claim first place. In the NEC tournament, Merrimack defeated LIU, Saint Francis (PA) and Fairleigh Dickinson to win the championship. Due to their ineligibility to compete in the NCAA tournament, runners-up Fairleigh Dickinson were awarded the NEC conference auto-bid, ending the Warriors' season with a final record of 18–16.

They ended the season with the nation's longest winning streak with 11 wins in a row.

== Previous season ==
The Warriors finished the 2021–22 season 14–16, 10–8 in NEC play, to finish in fourth place. The Warriors, in their third year of a transition to Division I, were ineligible for the NEC tournament and the NCAA tournament. They received an invitation to play in The Basketball Classic, but their opponent, UMBC, withdrew from the tournament due to health concerns, unofficially ending their season.

== Roster ==
2022–23 Merrimack Warriors men's basketball team
Players
Coaches

Pos.	#	Name	Height	Weight	Year	Hometown
G	0	Chevalier "Ice" Emery	6 ft 1 in (1.85 m)	—	Fr	Appleton, WI
G	1	Jaylen Stinson	6 ft 2 in (1.88 m)	170 lb (77 kg)	So	Philadelphia, PA
G	2	Javon Bennett	5 ft 11 in (1.8 m)	—	Fr	Orlando, FL
G	3	Mykel Derring	6 ft 2 in (1.88 m)	180 lb (82 kg)	Sr	Boston, MA
G	4	Jordan Derkack	6 ft 5 in (1.96 m)	—	Fr	Colonia, NJ
G	5	Devon Savage	6 ft 4 in (1.93 m)	190 lb (86 kg)	So	Washington, D.C.
F	10	Elliott Black	6 ft 7 in (2.01 m)	—	Fr	Washington, D.C.
F	11	Bryan Etumnu	6 ft 7 in (2.01 m)	—	Fr	Sugar Land, TX
G	12	Thomas Hall	6 ft 4 in (1.93 m)	195 lb (88 kg)	So	Nanuet, NY
F	14	Brandon Legris	6 ft 7 in (2.01 m)	—	Fr	Pennsburg, PA
F	15	Ryan Isaacson	6 ft 8 in (2.03 m)	200 lb (91 kg)	Jr	Willowbrook, IL
G	20	Nick Filchner	6 ft 7 in (2.01 m)	200 lb (91 kg)	So	Northampton, PA
F	22	Jordan Minor	6 ft 8 in (2.03 m)	240 lb (109 kg)	Sr	Kingston, MA
G/F	23	Ziggy Reid	6 ft 6 in (1.98 m)	235 lb (107 kg)	Sr	Baltimore, MD
G	24	Jordan McKoy	6 ft 5 in (1.96 m)	180 lb (82 kg)	Sr	Westwood, NJ

Head coach

- Joe Gallo (Merrimack)

Assistant coach(es)

- Micky Burtnyk (Merrimack)
- Phil Gaetano (Sacred Heart)

Legend

- (C) Team captain
- (S) Suspended
- (I) Ineligible
- (W) Walk-on
- Injured
- Current redshirt

Roster
Last update: November 15, 2022

== Schedule and results ==
Date time, TV	Rank^{#}	Opponent^{#}	Result	Record	Site (attendance) city, state
Regular season
November 7, 2022*; 6:45 p.m., FS1		at St. John's	L 72–97	0–1	Carnesecca Arena (4,505); Queens, NY
November 10, 2022*; 7:00 p.m.		Clark	W 64–48	1–1	Hammel Court (1,066); North Andover, MA
November 17, 2022*; 5:00 p.m., ESPN+		vs. Troy; ZooTown Classic	L 54–73	1–2	Dahlberg Arena; Missoula, MT
November 18, 2022*; 9:30 p.m., ESPN+		at Montana; ZooTown Classic	L 51–62	1–3	Dahlberg Arena (2,547); Missoula, MT
November 19, 2022*; 7:00 p.m., ESPN+		vs. St. Thomas (MN); ZooTown Classic	L 61–72	1–4	Dahlberg Arena (178); Missoula, MT
November 23, 2022*; 7:00 p.m., FS2		at Providence	L 57–71	1–5	Amica Mutual Pavilion (8,269); Providence, RI
November 26, 2022*; 4:00 p.m., ESPN3		at Bradley	L 41–83	1–6	Carver Arena (3,714); Peoria, IL
November 30, 2022*; 6:00 p.m., ESPN+		at UMass Lowell	L 51–77	1–7	Costello Athletic Center (482); Lowell, MA
December 2, 2022*; 7:00 p.m.		Boston University	L 54–68	1–8	Lawler Arena (2,602); North Andover, MA
December 4, 2022*; 2:00 p.m.		Vermont	L 43–66	1–9	Lawler Arena (1,727); North Andover, MA
December 7, 2022*; 10:30 p.m.		at San Francisco	L 51–69	1–10	War Memorial Gymnasium (1,733); San Francisco, CA
December 9, 2022*; 7:00 p.m.		New England	W 82–23	2–10	Lawler Arena (1,658); North Andover, MA
December 11, 2022*; 1:00 p.m.		Maine	L 47–50	2–11	Lawler Arena (1,712); North Andover, MA
December 18, 2022*; 2:00 p.m., ESPN+		at Bucknell	L 55–61	2–12	Sojka Pavilion (948); Lewisburg, PA
December 29, 2022; 7:00 p.m.		at Fairleigh Dickinson	L 63–71	2–13 (0–1)	Rothman Center (559); Hackensack, NJ
December 31, 2022; 1:00 p.m.		at Wagner	W 58–48	3–13 (1–1)	Spiro Sports Center (572); Staten Island, NY
January 5, 2023; 7:00 p.m.		Sacred Heart	L 55–59	3–14 (1–2)	Hammel Court (236); North Andover, MA
January 7, 2023; 3:00 p.m.		St. Francis Brooklyn	W 65–53	4–14 (2–2)	Hammel Court; North Andover, MA
January 14, 2023; 2:00 p.m., NEC Front Row		at Stonehill	W 59–47	5–14 (3–2)	Merkert Gymnasium (516); Easton, MA
January 16, 2023; 7:30 p.m., NEC Front Row		Wagner	L 57–62	5–15 (3–3)	Hammel Court (828); North Andover, MA
January 22, 2023; 1:00 p.m.		at St. Francis Brooklyn	W 63–55	6–15 (4–3)	Pratt ARC (137); Brooklyn, NY
January 26, 2023; 7:00 p.m.		at Central Connecticut	W 64–61	7–15 (5–3)	William H. Detrick Gymnasium (1,015); New Britain, CT
January 28, 2023; 3:00 p.m., ESPN3		Fairleigh Dickinson	L 71–78	7–16 (5–4)	Hammel Court (833); North Andover, MA
February 2, 2023; 7:00 p.m., CBSSN		LIU	W 76–59	8–16 (6–4)	Lawler Arena (2,247); North Andover, MA
February 4, 2023; 3:00 p.m.		Saint Francis (PA)	W 70–66	9–16 (7–4)	Hammel Court (367); North Andover, MA
February 9, 2023; 7:00 p.m.		Stonehill	W 56–43	10–16 (8–4)	Hammel Court (878); North Andover, MA
February 11, 2023; 4:00 p.m.		at Saint Francis (PA)	W 75–68	11–16 (9–4)	DeGol Arena (870); Loretto, PA
February 16, 2023*; 7:30 p.m.		at Hartford	W 67–59	12–16	Chase Arena (521); West Hartford, CT
February 18, 2023; 2:00 p.m.		at Sacred Heart	W 67–55	13–16 (10–4)	William H. Pitt Center (756); Fairfield, CT
February 23, 2023; 7:00 p.m.		Central Connecticut	W 70–54	14–16 (11–4)	Hammel Court (1,022); North Andover, MA
February 25, 2023; 1:00 p.m.		at LIU	W 80–59	15–16 (12–4)	Steinberg Wellness Center (310); Brooklyn, NY
NEC tournament
March 1, 2023; 7:00 p.m., NEC Front Row	(1)	(8) LIU; Quarterfinals	W 91–76	16–16	Lawler Arena (1,372); North Andover, MA
March 4, 2023; 6:00 p.m., ESPN3	(1)	(4) Sacred Heart; Semifinals	W 71–60	17–16	Hammel Court (747); North Andover, MA
March 7, 2023; 7:00 p.m., ESPN2	(1)	(2) Fairleigh Dickinson; Championship	W 67–66	18–16	Lawler Arena (2,214); North Andover, MA
*Non-conference game. ^{#}Rankings from AP poll. (#) Tournament seedings in parentheses. All times are in Eastern.
