= 2022–23 Stonehill Skyhawks men's basketball team =

College basketball team season

2022–23 Stonehill Skyhawks men's basketball
- Conference: Northeast Conference
- Record: 14–17 (10–6 NEC)
- Head coach: Chris Kraus (10th season)
- Assistant coaches: Jimmy Langhurst; Herschel Jenkins; Jason Karys
- Home arena: Merkert Gymnasium

2022–23 Northeast Conference men's basketball standings
	Conf.				Overall
Team	W		L	PCT	W		L	PCT
Merrimack*†	12	–	4	.750	18	–	16	.529
Fairleigh Dickinson^	10	–	6	.625	21	–	16	.568
Stonehill**	10	–	6	.625	14	–	17	.452
Saint Francis (PA)	9	–	7	.563	13	–	18	.419
Sacred Heart	8	–	8	.500	16	–	17	.485
Wagner	8	–	8	.500	15	–	13	.536
Central Connecticut	7	–	9	.438	10	–	22	.313
St. Francis Brooklyn	7	–	9	.438	14	–	16	.467
LIU	1	–	15	.063	3	–	26	.103
† 2023 NEC tournament winner: * ineligible for the 2023 NCAA tournament due to transition period; ** ineligible for both the 2023 NEC tournament and the 2023 NCAA tournament due to transition period; ^ received automatic bid for the 2023 NCAA tournament as conference tournament runner-up, due to Merrimack's ineligibility

The 2022–23 Stonehill Skyhawks men's basketball team represented Stonehill College in the 2022–23 NCAA Division I men's basketball season. The Skyhawks, led by tenth-year head coach Chris Kraus, played their home games at Merkert Gymnasium in Easton, Massachusetts, as first-year members of the Northeast Conference.

This season was Stonehill's first year of a four-year transition period from Division II to Division I. As a result, the Skyhawks were not eligible for NCAA postseason play until the 2026–27 season.

== Previous season ==
The Skyhawks finished the 2021–22 season 15–12, 10–9 in Northeast-10 (NE-10) play, to finish in fourth place in the Northeast Division. In the first round of the NE-10 tournament, they defeated Le Moyne in the first round before falling to Pace in the quarterfinals.

== Preseason polls ==
=== Northeast Conference poll ===
The Northeast Conference released its preseason coaches' poll on October 19, 2022. The Skyhawks were picked to finish last in the conference.

Rank	Team
1.	Merrimack (6)
2.	Sacred Heart (2)
3.	Saint Francis (PA)
4.	Wagner (1)
5.	St. Francis Brooklyn
T6.	Central Connecticut
T6.	Fairleigh Dickinson
8.	LIU
9.	Stonehill

() first-place votes

=== Preseason All-Conference Team ===
No Skyhawks were selected as members of the NEC Preseason All-Conference Team.

== Season notes ==
Five of the Skyhawks' top six scorers from the previous season returned.

The Skyhawks opened their inaugural Division I season against UConn at XL Center in Hartford, Connecticut on November 7, 2022. The Skyhawks fell, 85–54. Cole Bergan scored the first point for Stonehill as a Division I team on a free throw.

Stonehill's Division I home opener was on November 10, 2022, against Quinnipiac. The Skyhawks dropped a 102–95 decision in their first meeting with Quinnipiac, since the two teams were in the same Division II conference in 1998.

The Skyhawks' first Division I win came on November 12, 2022, when they used a 7–1 run to close the game and defeat Army West Point on the road, 82–77. Isaiah Burnett's jump shot in the final minute put Stonehill in front, 77–76, and they hit their free throws down the stretch to put the game away. The Skyhawks shot 52% from the field and were led by Andrew Sims, who shot 9 for 11 and added eight rebounds and two blocked shots. Burnett had 19 points for Stonehill, and Thatcher Stone added 15.

On November 19, Stonehill overcame an 11-point second-half deficit at the Tom Konchalski Classic at Fordham University to defeat Holy Cross, 81–79. After the Skyhawks had taken a three-point lead, the Crusaders tied the game at 79 with 11 seconds to play. With Stonehill out of time outs, Josh Mack brought the ball up the court, backed into position in the paint, and hit a contested hook shot that banked in with 2.1 seconds remaining to give Stonehill the win. Mack scored a season-high 10 points, and had four rebounds, two assists and a blocked shot. Through five games over the season's first two weeks, the Skyhawks led the NEC in field goal percentage at 49.5%, effective field goal percentage at 56.6%, and free throw percentage at 83.7%. They were second in three-point field goal percentage 38.1%.

Two Skyhawks earned Northeast Conference Player of the Week honors during the first two weeks of the season: Andrew Sims and Isaiah Burnett. Sims averaged 19.0 points, 4.3 rebounds, 1.7 assists and 1.0 blocks over first three games of the season. He shot 64.7% from the field and 90.9% from the free-throw line. He came off the bench to score a team-high 12 points at UConn in the season opener, and 18 of his 24 points in the second half against Quinnipiac in the Skyhawks' home opener. In his first start, Sims had a game-high 21 points while shooting 9–11 and collecting eight rebounds against Army West Point. Sims finished his first week ranked second in the NEC in both scoring and field goal accuracy.

Burnett averaged 20.0 points, 3.5 rebounds, 2.0 assists, 2.5 steals and 1.0 block per game during the second week of the season. He shot 64.7% from the field, 84.2% from the line and hit both his three-point attempts. After scoring 10 points at Providence, Burnett had a career-high 30 points on just nine shots from the field, making seven, and shot 15 for 17 from the free-throw line in the neutral-court win over Holy Cross. He also had four steals in the game. Burnett gave Stonehill a one-point lead with 2:49 to play on a three-point play and then hit three key free throws in the final 1:01.

Despite the Skyhawks losing two of their three games at the Tom Konchalski Classic, two Stonehill players, Andrew Sims and Isaiah Burnett, were named to the All-Tournament team.

Through the season's first three and four weeks, Stonehill led NCAA Division I in free-throw shooting percentage.

Josh Mack hit a three-pointer from the left wing at the buzzer off a pass from Cole Bergen to give Stonehill a dramatic 69–66 victory at Binghamton on December 3. The Skyhawks had a four-point lead with 18 seconds to play, only to see Binghamton tie the game with only five seconds remaining. However, without any timeouts, Stonehill was able to push the ball up the floor for the game-winning shot. Andrew Sims led the Skyhawks with 22 points.

Andrew Sims recorded a double-double with 17 points and a career-high 10 rebounds in Stonehill's NEC debut on December 29. The Skyhawks used 10 first-half three-pointers to build a 51–29 lead at Sacred Heart and then held on for a 74–67 victory. Shamir Johnson led Stonehill with 18 points.

Stonehill senior forward Andrew Sims became the 43rd player in school history to record his 1,000th career point in a 65–57 home loss against Fairleigh Dickinson on January 16. Isaiah Burnett had 20 points and eight rebounds for the Skyhawks in the game.

After falling behind, 31–19, at halftime at Fairleigh Dickinson on January 22, the Skyhawks put on an offensive show in the second half on their way to a 70–59 victory. In a game Stonehill trailed by as many as 16 points, Shamir Johnson led the Skyhawks' comeback by scoring 20 of his 23 points in the second half, while hitting five of his seven three-point attempts and grabbing six rebounds. Stonehill shot 68.2% on their field goal attempts and hit seven of 10 three-pointers while scoring 52 second-half points. The Fairleigh Dickinson loss knocked the Knights out of first place, a half game behind Saint Francis (PA).

With Fairleigh Dickinson losing to Wagner on February 4, the door was open for Stonehill, which won their third straight game, 65–59, at St. Francis Brooklyn to improve their conference record to 8–3 and move into first place in the NEC. Max Zegarowski scored 17 points, including the 1,000th point of his college career, and had seven rebounds for the Skyhawks.

First-place Stonehill traveled to Merrimack on February 9, for a key game between NEC contenders. The Warriors got 16 points and 10 rebounds from Jordan Minor and earned a 56–43 victory, leaving both teams with 8–4 conference records. Thatcher Stone scored 10 points for the Skyhawks.

While Stonehill and Merrimack were battling in North Andover, Fairleigh Dickinson was visiting LIU. The Knights had an 11-point lead with four minutes to play, but the Sharks pulled within a single point in the closing minute. C.J. Delancy's jump shot from the elbow at the buzzer missed, and the Knights escaped with an 80–79 victory that gave them an 8–3 conference record and vaulted them back into first place in the NEC.

Stonehill got back on the winning track on February 11, against St. Francis Brooklyn. Andrew Sims scored 30 points and gathered seven rebounds to lead the Skyhawks to a 62–51 home win that improved Stonehill's conference record to 9–4.

Following Stonehill's early-afternoon tilt, Merrimack earned a 75–68 road win at Saint Francis (PA), which improved the Warriors' league record to 9–4.

Fairleigh Dickinson hosted Central Connecticut on the evening of February 11, looking to win and remain in first place. However, the Blue Devils earned a 77–73 road win.

The Merrimack and Stonehill wins and the Fairleigh Dickinson loss on February 11, left the Warriors and Skyhawks tied for first place with the Knights a half game behind.

While Merrimack was winning a non-conference game at Hartford on February 16, Stonehill puts its share of first place on the line at home against LIU. The Skyhawks got 30 points and six rebounds from Max Zegarowski on their way to a 75–60 victory that put them alone atop the NEC standings with a 10–4 conference record.

Central Connecticut hosted Stonehill on February 18, in a game that became a triple overtime thriller. With the game tied on the final possessions of regulation and each of the first two overtimes, all attempts to beat the buzzer came up empty. However, in the closing seconds of the third overtime, the Blue Devils had the ball and a two-point lead. Central Connecticut broke the Skyhawks' trap and Nigel Scantlebury found Tre Breland for a dunk with two seconds remaining that put the game away for the Blue Devils. Andrew Sims scored 24 points and grabbed seven rebounds for the Skyhawks, who fell out of first place with the loss. It was the first overtime game for Stonehill as a Division I team.

Stonehill's hopes for an NEC regular-season championship came to an end, when Merrimack earned a 70–54 home win over Central Connecticut on February 23.

Skyhawks head coach Chris Kraus was voted Jim Phelan Coach of the Year by the NEC's coaches.

Stonehill had three all-conference players, the most ever by a first-year NEC program, and tied for the most among NEC teams this season. Fifth-year senior Andrew Sims was selected to the first team. He ranked sixth in the league in scoring at 15.2 points per game. Isaiah Burnett earned a second-team selection by ranking second in the NEC and fourth nationally with 2.8 steals per game. Graduate student forward Max Zegarowski shot 45.6% from three-point range during conference play to merit a third-team selection. He ranked second overall in three-point shooting accuracy at 41.9%.

== Roster ==
2022–23 Stonehill Skyhawks men's basketball team
Players
Coaches

Pos.	#	Name	Height	Weight	Year	Hometown
G	1	Will Rywolt	5 ft 11 in (1.8 m)	165 lb (75 kg)	Jr	Barrington, RI
F	2	Max Zegarowski	6 ft 8 in (2.03 m)	205 lb (93 kg)	GS	South Hamilton, MA
G	3	Jackson Benigni	6 ft 1 in (1.85 m)	180 lb (82 kg)	Jr	East Hampton, CT
G	4	Chas Stinson	6 ft 4 in (1.93 m)	175 lb (79 kg)	Fr	Charlotte, NC
G	5	Josh Mack	6 ft 0 in (1.83 m)	175 lb (79 kg)	Sr	Winchester, VA
G	11	Isaiah Burnett	6 ft 5 in (1.96 m)	180 lb (82 kg)	Sr	Annapolis, MD
G	12	Thatcher Stone	6 ft 6 in (1.98 m)	200 lb (91 kg)	Jr	Winchester, MA
G	15	John III O'Reilly	6 ft 0 in (1.83 m)	170 lb (77 kg)	Jr	Montville, NJ
G	20	Nathan McGill	6 ft 4 in (1.93 m)	190 lb (86 kg)	So	Dillsburg, PA
F	21	Cole Bergan	6 ft 8 in (2.03 m)	215 lb (98 kg)	GS	Aberdeen, SD
G	22	Shamir Johnson	6 ft 2 in (1.88 m)	180 lb (82 kg)	Sr	Waterbury, CT
F	23	Christopher Melis	6 ft 5 in (1.96 m)	205 lb (93 kg)	So	Chappaqua, NY
G	30	Helio Sousa Erazo	5 ft 10 in (1.78 m)	160 lb (73 kg)	Jr	Warwick, RI
F	32	Andrew Sims	6 ft 6 in (1.98 m)	200 lb (91 kg)	Sr	Mount Laurel, NJ
G	33	Ethan Meuser	6 ft 8 in (2.03 m)	195 lb (88 kg)	Fr	Shavertown, PA
F	34	Neal Marquardt	6 ft 5 in (1.96 m)	205 lb (93 kg)	So	Rockville Centre, NY

Head coach

- Chris Kraus (Stonehill)

Assistant coach(es)

- Jimmy Langhurst (Robert Morris)
- Herschel Jenkins (Staten Island)
- Jason Karys (Valparaiso)

Legend

- (C) Team captain
- (S) Suspended
- (I) Ineligible
- (W) Walk-on
- Injured
- Current redshirt

Roster
Last update: March 15, 2025

== Schedule and results ==
Date time, TV	Rank^{#}	Opponent^{#}	Result	Record	High points	High rebounds	High assists	Site (attendance) city, state
Regular season
November 7, 2022*; 7:30 p.m., FS1		at UConn	L 54–85	0–1	12 – 2 tied	6 – Burnett	4 – Bergan	XL Center (9,116); Hartford, CT
November 10, 2022*; 7:00 p.m., NEC Front Row		Quinnipiac	L 95–102	0–2	25 – Zegarowski	8 – Zegarowski	4 – Burnett	Merkert Gymnasium (1,116); Easton, MA
November 12, 2022*; 1:00 p.m., ESPN+		at Army	W 82–77	1–2	21 – Sims	7 – Sims	4 – 2 tied	Christl Arena (677); West Point, NY
November 15, 2022*; 5:00 p.m., FS2		at Providence	L 76–100	1–3	15 – Johnson	4 – 2 tied	4 – Bergan	Amica Mutual Pavilion (5,887); Providence, RI
November 19, 2022*; 7:30 p.m.		vs. Holy Cross; Tom Konchalski Classic	W 81–79	2–3	30 – Burnett	7 – Johnson	2 – 2 tied	Rose Hill Gymnasium; The Bronx, NY
November 21, 2022*; 4:00 p.m.		vs. UIC; Tom Konchalski Classic	L 71–77	2–4	24 – Sims	8 – Zegarowski	3 – 2 tied	Rose Hill Gymnasium; The Bronx, NY
November 22, 2022*; 7:00 p.m., ESPN+		at Fordham; Tom Konchalski Classic	L 60–71	2–5	16 – Sims	5 – Sims	7 – Sims	Rose Hill Gymnasium; The Bronx, NY
November 27, 2022*; 1:00 p.m., ESPN+		at UMass Lowell	L 59–73	2–6	18 – Zegarowski	6 – 2 tied	3 – Stone	Costello Athletic Center (410); Lowell, MA
November 30, 2022*; 7:00 p.m., NEC Front Row		Eastern Nazarene	W 92–45	3–6	28 – Zegarowski	7 – Stone	4 – 2 tied	Merkert Gymnasium (427); Easton, MA
December 3, 2022*; 4:00 p.m., ESPN3		at Binghamton	W 69–66	4–6	22 – Sims	12 – Burnett	6 – Burnett	Binghamton University Events Center (1,600); Vestal, NY
December 7, 2022*; 7:00 p.m., NEC Front Row		Rider	L 67–78	4–7	17 – Burnett	7 – Sims	5 – Burnett	Merkert Gymnasium (150); Easton, MA
December 13, 2022*; 7:00 p.m., ACCNX/ESPN+		at Boston College	L 56–63	4–8	20 – Sims	6 – Melis	2 – 2 tied	Conte Forum (3,749); Chestnut Hill, MA
December 19, 2022*; 8:00 p.m., ESPN+		at Bradley	L 50–79	4–9	13 – Sims	4 – 2 tied	3 – Burnett	Carver Arena (3,716); Peoria, IL
December 21, 2022*; 1:00 p.m., ESPN+		at Valparaiso	L 67–77	4–10	12 – Burnett	5 – Johnson	2 – 3 tied	Athletics–Recreation Center (1,617); Valparaiso, IN
December 29, 2022; 2:00 p.m., NEC Front Row		at Sacred Heart	W 74–67	5–10 (1–0)	18 – Johnson	10 – Sims	4 – Bergan	William H. Pitt Center (833); Fairfield, CT
December 31, 2022; 4:00 p.m., NEC Front Row		at Saint Francis (PA)	L 72–73	5–11 (1–1)	25 – Burnett	7 – Burnett	4 – Mack	DeGol Arena (355); Loretto, PA
January 5, 2023; 7:00 p.m., NEC Front Row		Wagner	W 62–58	6–11 (2–1)	16 – Burnett	7 – Burnett	2 – Sims	Merkert Gymnasium (411); Easton, MA
January 7, 2023; 2:00 p.m., NEC Front Row		Central Connecticut	W 51–49	7–11 (3–1)	16 – Zegarowski	7 – 2 tied	3 – Bergan	Merkert Gymnasium (631); Easton, MA
January 14, 2023; 2:00 p.m., NEC Front Row		Merrimack	L 47–59	7–12 (3–2)	17 – Zegarowski	10 – Zegarowski	5 – Bergan	Merkert Gymnasium (516); Easton, MA
January 16, 2023; 7:00 p.m., NEC Front Row		Fairleigh Dickinson	L 57–65	7–13 (3–3)	11 – Zegarowski	8 – Burnett	3 – Johnson	Merkert Gymnasium (706); Easton, MA
January 20, 2023; 7:00 p.m., NEC Front Row		at LIU	W 73–66	8–13 (4–3)	24 – Sims	7 – Sims	5 – Burnett	Steinberg Wellness Center (256); Brooklyn, NY
January 22, 2023; 6:00 p.m., NEC Front Row		at Fairleigh Dickinson	W 70–59	9–13 (5–3)	23 – Johnson	7 – Burnett	5 – Burnett	Rothman Center (1,115); Hackensack, NJ
January 25, 2023*; 7:00 p.m., Hartford Hawks All-Access		at Hartford	L 56–73	9–14 (5–3)	16 – Mack	5 – Mack	4 – 2 tied	Chase Arena (328); West Hartford, CT
January 28, 2023; 2:00 p.m., NEC Front Row		Sacred Heart	W 82–81	10–14 (6–3)	23 – 2 tied	6 – Burnett	5 – Mack	Merkert Gymnasium (1,896); Easton, MA
February 2, 2023; 7:00 p.m., NEC Front Row		Saint Francis (PA)	W 74–61	11–14 (7–3)	22 – Burnett	6 – Sims	2 – 4 tied	Merkert Gymnasium (1,116); Easton, MA
February 4, 2023; 1:00 p.m., NEC Front Row		at St. Francis Brooklyn	W 65–59	12–14 (8–3)	17 – 2 tied	7 – Zegarowski	5 – Sims	Pratt ARC (157); Brooklyn, NY
February 9, 2023; 7:00 p.m., NEC Front Row		at Merrimack	L 43–56	12–15 (8–4)	10 – Stone	5 – 5 tied	5 – Burnett	Hammel Court (878); North Andover, MA
February 11, 2023; 2:00 p.m., NEC Front Row		St. Francis Brooklyn	W 62–51	13–15 (9–4)	30 – Sims	7 – Sims	2 – 3 tied	Merkert Gymnasium (746); Easton, MA
February 16, 2023; 7:00 p.m., NEC Front Row		LIU	W 75–60	14–15 (10–4)	30 – Zegarowski	7 – Sims	2 – 4 tied	Merkert Gymnasium (876); Easton, MA
February 18, 2023; 1:00 p.m., NEC Front Row		at Central Connecticut	L 90–94 ^{3OT}	14–16 (10–5)	26 – Sims	11 – Zegarowski	3 – 3 tied	William H. Detrick Gymnasium (929); New Britain, CT
February 23, 2023; 7:00 p.m., NEC Front Row		at Wagner	L 44–54	14–17 (10–6)	11 – Burnett	4 – 2 tied	5 – Sims	Spiro Sports Center (1,257); Staten Island, NY
*Non-conference game. ^{#}Rankings from AP poll. (#) Tournament seedings in parentheses. All times are in Eastern.

== See also ==
- 2022–23 Stonehill Skyhawks women's basketball team
