= 2022–23 LIU Sharks men's basketball team =

American college basketball season

2022–23 LIU Sharks men's basketball
- Conference: Northeast Conference
- Record: 3–26 (1–15 NEC)
- Head coach: Rod Strickland (1st season)
- Assistant coaches: Chris Thomas (1st season); Shasha Brown (1st season); Maurice Hicks (1st season)
- Home arena: Steinberg Wellness Center

2022–23 Northeast Conference men's basketball standings
	Conf.				Overall
Team	W		L	PCT	W		L	PCT
Merrimack*†	12	–	4	.750	18	–	16	.529
Fairleigh Dickinson^	10	–	6	.625	21	–	16	.568
Stonehill**	10	–	6	.625	14	–	17	.452
Saint Francis (PA)	9	–	7	.563	13	–	18	.419
Sacred Heart	8	–	8	.500	16	–	17	.485
Wagner	8	–	8	.500	15	–	13	.536
Central Connecticut	7	–	9	.438	10	–	22	.313
St. Francis Brooklyn	7	–	9	.438	14	–	16	.467
LIU	1	–	15	.063	3	–	26	.103
† 2023 NEC tournament winner: * ineligible for the 2023 NCAA tournament due to transition period; ** ineligible for both the 2023 NEC tournament and the 2023 NCAA tournament due to transition period; ^ received automatic bid for the 2023 NCAA tournament as conference tournament runner-up, due to Merrimack's ineligibility

The 2022–23 LIU Sharks men's basketball team represented Long Island University in the 2022–23 NCAA Division I men's basketball season. The Sharks, led by first-year head coach Rod Strickland, played their home games at the Steinberg Wellness Center in Brooklyn, New York as members of the Northeast Conference (NEC).

== Previous season ==
The Sharks finished the 2021–22 season 16–14, 12–6 in NEC play, to finish in third place. As the No. 3 seed, they defeated No. 6 seed Sacred Heart in the quarterfinals of the NEC tournament, before falling to No. 2 seed Wagner.

On June 30, the school announced the firing of head coach Derek Kellogg, after 5 season at the helm. They immediately named NBA G League Ignite program manager Rod Strickland as the Sharks' next head coach.

== Roster ==
2022–23 LIU Sharks men's basketball team
Players
Coaches

Pos.	#	Name	Height	Weight	Year	Hometown
G	0	Weston Baer	6 ft 2 in (1.88 m)	175 lb (79 kg)	So	Pomeroy, OH
G	1	Tre Booker	6 ft 4 in (1.93 m)	200 lb (91 kg)	So	Richmond, VA
G	2	Tre' Wood	6 ft 1 in (1.85 m)	170 lb (77 kg)	RS Sr	Largo, MD
G	3	Maurice Commander	6 ft 0 in (1.83 m)	175 lb (79 kg)	GS	Chicago, IL
G	4	Jacob Johnson	6 ft 5 in (1.96 m)	195 lb (88 kg)	RS So	Minneapolis, MN
G	5	Andre Washington	5 ft 11 in (1.8 m)	178 lb (81 kg)	So	Staten Island, NY
G	10	R.J. Greene	6 ft 6 in (1.98 m)	207 lb (94 kg)	Fr	The Bronx, NY
G/F	11	Noble Crawford	6 ft 5 in (1.96 m)	185 lb (84 kg)	So	Orlando, FL
F	13	James Kamich	6 ft 9 in (2.06 m)	195 lb (88 kg)	Jr	Tonj, South Sudan
F/C	15	C.J. Delancy	6 ft 8 in (2.03 m)	201 lb (91 kg)	Fr	Jonesboro, AR
F	20	Jake Cook	6 ft 8 in (2.03 m)	180 lb (82 kg)	Jr	Watervliet, NY
F	21	Cheikh Ndiaye	6 ft 8 in (2.03 m)	250 lb (113 kg)	Sr	Thiès, Senegal
G	22	Elijah Bailey	5 ft 11 in (1.8 m)	140 lb (64 kg)	Fr	Brooklyn, NY
G	24	Marko Maletic	6 ft 6 in (1.98 m)	208 lb (94 kg)	So	London, ON
F/C	34	Amadou Fall	6 ft 10 in (2.08 m)	240 lb (109 kg)	Jr	Kaolack, Senegal
G	44	Quion Burns	6 ft 6 in (1.98 m)	180 lb (82 kg)	So	White Plains, NY

Head coach

- Rod Strickland (DePaul)

Assistant coach(es)

- Chris Thomas (Dayton)
- Shasha Brown (Wesleyan)
- Maurice Hicks (Loyola (MD))

Legend

- (C) Team captain
- (S) Suspended
- (I) Ineligible
- (W) Walk-on
- Injured
- Current redshirt

Roster
Last update: November 7, 2022

== Schedule and results ==
Date time, TV	Rank^{#}	Opponent^{#}	Result	Record	Site (attendance) city, state
Non-conference regular season
November 7, 2022*; 11:00 p.m., P12N		at Utah	L 48–89	0–1	Jon M. Huntsman Center (5,878); Salt Lake City, UT
November 14, 2022*; 6:00 p.m., NEC Front Row		Mount Saint Vincent	W 111–50	1–1	Steinberg Wellness Center (500); Brooklyn, NY
November 17, 2022*; 8:30 p.m., FS2		at Marquette; Fort Myers Tip-Off campus-site game	L 58–95	1–2	Fiserv Forum (12,476); Milwaukee, WI
November 22, 2022*; 2:30 p.m.		vs. South Dakota; Fort Myers Tip-Off Palms division semifinals	L 58–68	1–3	Suncoast Credit Union Arena (333); Fort Myers, FL
November 23, 2022*; 11:00 a.m.		vs. Northern Illinois; Fort Myers Tip-Off Palms division consolation	L 61–86	1–4	Suncoast Credit Union Arena (314); Fort Myers, FL
November 29, 2022*; 6:30 p.m., FS1		at St. John's	L 68–95	1–5	Carnesecca Arena (3,901); Queens, NY
December 2, 2022*; 7:00 p.m., NEC Front Row		Towson	L 64–74	1–6	Steinberg Wellness Center (310); Brooklyn, NY
December 5, 2022*; 7:00 p.m., NEC Front Row		UMass Lowell	L 64–84	1–7	Steinberg Wellness Center (456); Brooklyn, NY
December 10, 2022*; 12:30 p.m., FS1		at No. 5 UConn	L 61–114	1–8	Harry A. Gampel Pavilion (10,167); Storrs, CT
December 14, 2022*; 7:00 p.m., ESPN+		at Albany	L 59–76	1–9	McDonough Sports Complex (907); Troy, NY
December 18, 2022*; 2:00 p.m., ESPN+		at James Madison	L 79–115	1–10	Atlantic Union Bank Center (2,785); Harrisonburg, VA
December 22, 2022*; 7:00 p.m., NEC Front Row		Purchase	W 95–58	2–10	Steinberg Wellness Center (412); Brooklyn, NY
NEC regular season
December 29, 2022; 7:00 p.m., NEC Front Row		Wagner	L 61–69	2–11 (0–1)	Barclays Center (375); Brooklyn, NY
December 31, 2022; 1:00 p.m., NEC Front Row		Sacred Heart	L 64–82	2–12 (0–2)	Steinberg Wellness Center (325); Brooklyn, NY
January 5, 2023; 7:00 p.m., NEC Front Row		at Central Connecticut	L 59–78	2–13 (0–3)	William H. Detrick Gymnasium (314); New Britain, CT
January 7, 2023; 1:00 p.m., NEC Front Row		at Fairleigh Dickinson	L 89–101	2–14 (0–4)	Rothman Center (548); Hackensack, NJ
January 14, 2023; 4:00 p.m., NEC Front Row		at Saint Francis (PA)	L 68–87	2–15 (0–5)	DeGol Arena (485); Loretto, PA
January 16, 2023; 7:00 p.m., ESPN3/SNY		St. Francis Brooklyn	L 66–73	2–16 (0–6)	Steinberg Wellness Center (400); Brooklyn, NY
January 20, 2023; 7:00 p.m., NEC Front Row		Stonehill	L 66–73	2–17 (0–7)	Steinberg Wellness Center (256); Brooklyn, NY
January 22, 2023; 12:00 p.m., NEC Front Row		Central Connecticut	L 42–58	2–18 (0–8)	Steinberg Wellness Center (215); Brooklyn, NY
January 26, 2023; 7:00 p.m., NEC Front Row		at Sacred Heart	W 74–70	3–18 (1–8)	William H. Pitt Center (718); Fairfield, CT
January 28, 2023; 1:00 p.m., NEC Front Row		at St. Francis Brooklyn; Battle of Brooklyn	L 59–71	3–19 (1–9)	Pratt ARC (223); Brooklyn, NY
February 2, 2023; 7:00 p.m., CBSSN		at Merrimack	L 59–76	3–20 (1–10)	Hammel Court (CBSSN); North Andover, MA
February 9, 2023; 7:00 p.m., NEC Front Row		Fairleigh Dickinson	L 79–80	3–21 (1–11)	Steinberg Wellness Center (275); Brooklyn, NY
February 11, 2023; 1:00 p.m., NEC Front Row		at Wagner	L 46–58	3–22 (1–12)	Spiro Sports Center (1,218); Staten Island, NY
February 16, 2023; 7:00 p.m., NEC Front Row		at Stonehill	L 60–75	3–23 (1–13)	Merkert Gymnasium (876); Easton, MA
February 18, 2023; 1:00 p.m., NEC Front Row		Saint Francis (PA)	L 82–93	3–24 (1–14)	Steinberg Wellness Center (323); Brooklyn, NY
February 25, 2023; 1:00 p.m., NEC Front Row		Merrimack	L 59–80	3–25 (1–15)	Steinberg Wellness Center (310); Brooklyn, NY
NEC tournament
March 1, 2023; 7:00 p.m., NEC Front Row	(8)	at (1) Merrimack; Quarterfinals	L 76–91	3–26	Hammel Court (1,372); North Andover, MA
*Non-conference game. ^{#}Rankings from AP poll. (#) Tournament seedings in parentheses. All times are in Eastern.
