= 2022–23 Sacred Heart Pioneers men's basketball team =

American college basketball season

2022–23 Sacred Heart Pioneers men's basketball
- Conference: Northeast Conference
- Record: 16–17 (8–8 NEC)
- Head coach: Anthony Latina (10th season)
- Assistant coaches: Johnny Kidd; Kevin Papacs; Kyle Steinway
- Home arena: William H. Pitt Center

2022–23 Northeast Conference men's basketball standings
	Conf.				Overall
Team	W		L	PCT	W		L	PCT
Merrimack*†	12	–	4	.750	18	–	16	.529
Fairleigh Dickinson^	10	–	6	.625	21	–	16	.568
Stonehill**	10	–	6	.625	14	–	17	.452
Saint Francis (PA)	9	–	7	.563	13	–	18	.419
Sacred Heart	8	–	8	.500	16	–	17	.485
Wagner	8	–	8	.500	15	–	13	.536
Central Connecticut	7	–	9	.438	10	–	22	.313
St. Francis Brooklyn	7	–	9	.438	14	–	16	.467
LIU	1	–	15	.063	3	–	26	.103
† 2023 NEC tournament winner: * ineligible for the 2023 NCAA tournament due to transition period; ** ineligible for both the 2023 NEC tournament and the 2023 NCAA tournament due to transition period; ^ received automatic bid for the 2023 NCAA tournament as conference tournament runner-up, due to Merrimack's ineligibility

The 2022–23 Sacred Heart Pioneers men's basketball team represented Sacred Heart University in the 2022–23 NCAA Division I men's basketball season. The Pioneers, led by tenth-year head coach Anthony Latina, played their home games at the William H. Pitt Center in Fairfield, Connecticut as members of the Northeast Conference (NEC).

== Previous season ==
The Pioneers finished the 2021–22 season 10–20, 6–12 in NEC play, to finish in seventh place. They lost in the quarterfinals of the NEC tournament to LIU.

== Roster ==
2022–23 Sacred Heart Pioneers men's basketball team
Players
Coaches

Pos.	#	Name	Height	Weight	Year	Hometown
G	1	Joey Reilly	6 ft 0 in (1.83 m)	170 lb (77 kg)	Sr	Cromwell, CT
G	3	Mike Sixsmith	6 ft 0 in (1.83 m)	170 lb (77 kg)	Jr	Hicksville, NY
G	5	Kenneth Womack	5 ft 11 in (1.8 m)	186 lb (84 kg)	Jr	Upper Marlboro, MD
G	10	Dominic Mello	6 ft 0 in (1.83 m)	165 lb (75 kg)	So	Wareham, MA
G	11	Raheem Solomon	6 ft 3 in (1.91 m)	185 lb (84 kg)	GS	Hartford, CT
G	13	Najee Coursey	6 ft 6 in (1.98 m)	175 lb (79 kg)	So	Galloway, NJ
G	14	Tommaso Ferraresi	6 ft 4 in (1.93 m)	190 lb (86 kg)	Jr	Venice, Italy
F	15	Raymond Espinal-Guzman	6 ft 8 in (2.03 m)	210 lb (95 kg)	So	Cranston, RI
F	21	Bryce Johnson	6 ft 6 in (1.98 m)	210 lb (95 kg)	Jr	Stockton, CA
G	22	Brendan McGuire	6 ft 7 in (2.01 m)	210 lb (95 kg)	GS	Garden City, NY
F	25	Tanner Thomas	6 ft 6 in (1.98 m)	205 lb (93 kg)	So	Springfield, MA
G	35	Aidan Carpenter	6 ft 5 in (1.96 m)	190 lb (86 kg)	Jr	Hamden, CT
F	45	Nico Galette	6 ft 6 in (1.98 m)	210 lb (95 kg)	Jr	Rahway, NJ

Head coach

- Anthony Latina (Brandeis)

Assistant coach(es)

- Johnny Kidd (Central Connecticut State)
- Kevin Papacs (Central Connecticut State)
- Kyle Steinway (Providence)

Legend

- (C) Team captain
- (S) Suspended
- (I) Ineligible
- (W) Walk-on
- Injured
- Current redshirt

Roster
Last update: December 17, 2022

== Schedule and results ==
Date time, TV	Rank^{#}	Opponent^{#}	Result	Record	Site (attendance) city, state
Regular season
November 8, 2022*; 7:00 p.m.		at Hartford	W 77–70	1–0	Chase Arena (840); West Hartford, CT
November 10, 2022*; 7:00 p.m., BTN+		at Rutgers	L 50–88	1–1	Jersey Mike's Arena (8,000); Piscataway, NJ
November 13, 2022*; 1:00 p.m., NEC Front Row		Columbia	W 88–85	2–1	William H. Pitt Center (723); Fairfield, CT
November 16, 2022*; 4:00 p.m., ESPN+		at UMass Lowell	L 81–90	2–2	Costello Athletic Center (608); Lowell, MA
November 19, 2022*; 2:00 p.m., ESPN3		at Binghamton	W 75–60	3–2	Binghamton University Events Center (1,802); Vestal, NY
November 22, 2022*; 1:00 p.m., NEC Front Row		NJIT	L 75–85	3–3	William H. Pitt Center (443); Fairfield, CT
November 28, 2022*; 7:00 p.m., NEC Front Row		Western New England	W 100–59	4–3	William H. Pitt Center (433); Fairfield, CT
November 30, 2022*; 7:00 p.m., ESPN+		at New Hampshire	W 66–61	5–3	Lundholm Gym (369); Durham, NH
December 3, 2022*; 2:00 p.m., NEC Front Row		UMass Lowell	L 59–70	5–4	William H. Pitt Center (517); Fairfield, CT
December 7, 2022*; 7:00 p.m., ESPN+		at Fairfield	L 59–61	5–5	Leo D. Mahoney Arena (2,819); Fairfield, CT
December 10, 2022*; 3:30 p.m., ACCN		at Pittsburgh	L 66–91	5–6	Petersen Events Center (6,019); Pittsburgh, PA
December 12, 2022*; 6:30 p.m., FloHoops		at Stony Brook	L 64–71	5–7	Island Federal Arena (1,708); Stony Brook, NY
December 19, 2022*; 7:00 p.m., ESPN+		at Saint Joseph's	L 59–77	5–8	Hagan Arena (819); Philadelphia, PA
December 22, 2022*; 11:30 a.m., NEC Front Row		Holy Cross	W 66–62	6–8	William H. Pitt Center (563); Fairfield, CT
December 29, 2022; 2:00 p.m., NEC Front Row		Stonehill	L 67–74	6–9 (0–1)	William H. Pitt Center (833); Fairfield, CT
December 31, 2022; 1:00 p.m., NEC Front Row		at LIU	W 82–64	7–9 (1–1)	Steinberg Wellness Center (325); Brooklyn, NY
January 5, 2023; 7:00 p.m., NEC Front Row		at Merrimack	W 59–55	8–9 (2–1)	Hammel Court (236); North Andover, MA
January 7, 2023*; 2:00 p.m., NEC Front Row		Hartford	W 78–71	9–9	William H. Pitt Center; Fairfield, CT
January 14, 2023; 1:00 p.m., NEC Front Row		at St. Francis Brooklyn	L 79–82	9–10 (2–2)	Pratt ARC (125); Brooklyn, NY
January 16, 2023; 2:00 p.m., NEC Front Row		Saint Francis (PA)	W 54–51	10–10 (3–2)	William H. Pitt Center (529); Fairfield, CT
January 20, 2023; 7:00 p.m., NEC Front Row		at Fairleigh Dickinson	W 92–85	11–10 (4–2)	Rothman Center (276); Hackensack, NJ
January 22, 2023; 1:00 p.m., NEC Front Row		at Wagner	L 58–68	11–11 (4–3)	Spiro Sports Center (518); Staten Island, NY
January 26, 2023; 7:00 p.m., NEC Front Row		LIU	L 70–74	11–12 (4–4)	William H. Pitt Center (718); Fairfield, CT
January 28, 2023; 2:00 p.m., NEC Front Row		at Stonehill	L 81–82	11–13 (4–5)	Merkert Gymnasium (1,896); Easton, MA
February 2, 2023; 7:00 p.m., NEC Front Row		Wagner	W 65–56	12–13 (5–5)	William H. Pitt Center (715); Fairfield, CT
February 4, 2023; 2:00 p.m., NEC Front Row		Central Connecticut	W 78–65	13–13 (6–5)	William H. Pitt Center (1,033); Fairfield, CT
February 9, 2023; 5:00 p.m., ESPNU		at Saint Francis (PA)	L 76–78 ^{OT}	13–14 (6–6)	DeGol Arena (670); Loretto, PA
February 16, 2023; 7:00 p.m., NEC Front Row		Fairleigh Dickinson	W 94–86 ^{OT}	14–14 (7–6)	William H. Pitt Center (828); Fairfield, CT
February 18, 2023; 2:00 p.m., CBSSN		Merrimack	L 55–67	14–15 (7–7)	William H. Pitt Center (756); Fairfield, CT
February 23, 2023; 7:00 p.m., NEC Front Row		St. Francis Brooklyn	L 63–70	14–16 (7–8)	William H. Pitt Center (582); Fairfield, CT
February 25, 2023; 1:00 p.m., NEC Front Row		at Central Connecticut	W 69–67	15–16 (8–8)	William H. Detrick Gymnasium (703); New Britain, CT
NEC tournament
March 1, 2023; 7:00 p.m., NEC Front Row	(4)	(5) Wagner; Quarterfinals	W 67–55	16–16	William H. Pitt Center (398); Fairfield, CT
March 4, 2023; 6:00 p.m., ESPN3	(4)	(1) Merrimack; Semifinals	L 61–70	16–17	Hammel Court (747); North Andover, MA
*Non-conference game. ^{#}Rankings from AP poll. (#) Tournament seedings in parentheses. All times are in Eastern.
