= 2022–23 St. Francis Brooklyn Terriers men's basketball team =

American college basketball season

2022–23 St. Francis Brooklyn Terriers men's basketball
- Conference: Northeast Conference
- Record: 14–16 (7–9 NEC)
- Head coach: Glenn Braica (13th season)
- Assistant coaches: Ron Ganulin (10th season); Jonathan Blount (2nd season)
- Home arena: Daniel Lynch Gymnasium

2022–23 Northeast Conference men's basketball standings
	Conf.				Overall
Team	W		L	PCT	W		L	PCT
Merrimack*†	12	–	4	.750	18	–	16	.529
Fairleigh Dickinson^	10	–	6	.625	21	–	16	.568
Stonehill**	10	–	6	.625	14	–	17	.452
Saint Francis (PA)	9	–	7	.563	13	–	18	.419
Sacred Heart	8	–	8	.500	16	–	17	.485
Wagner	8	–	8	.500	15	–	13	.536
Central Connecticut	7	–	9	.438	10	–	22	.313
St. Francis Brooklyn	7	–	9	.438	14	–	16	.467
LIU	1	–	15	.063	3	–	26	.103
† 2023 NEC tournament winner: * ineligible for the 2023 NCAA tournament due to transition period; ** ineligible for both the 2023 NEC tournament and the 2023 NCAA tournament due to transition period; ^ received automatic bid for the 2023 NCAA tournament as conference tournament runner-up, due to Merrimack's ineligibility

The 2022–23 St. Francis Brooklyn Terriers men's basketball team represented St. Francis College in the 2022–23 NCAA Division I men's basketball season. The Terriers, led by 13th-year head coach Glenn Braica, opened the season as members of the Northeast Conference, playing their final two home games at Daniel Lynch Gymnasium in Brooklyn Heights, New York. On November 30, 2022, the Terriers temporarily began playing their home games at the Pratt Activity Resource Center, frequently called the Pratt ARC, on the main Brooklyn campus of Pratt Institute, due to St. Francis College's move to its new campus on Livingston Street.

The Terriers finished the season 14–16, 7–9 in NEC play to finish in a tie for seventh place. As the No. 7 seed in the NEC Tournament, they lost to Fairleigh Dickinson in the quarterfinals. On March 20, St. Francis Brooklyn announced the discontinuation of their athletic department, meaning the 2022–23 season would be the final season in school history.

== Previous season ==
The Terriers finished the 2021–22 season 10–20, 7–11 in NEC play to finish in sixth place. As the 5 seed, they were defeated by 4 seed Mount St. Mary's in the quarterfinals of the NEC Tournament.

== Final game ==
In what would prove to be the final men's basketball game in the history of St. Francis Brooklyn, Fairleigh Dickinson scored the first seven points and led wire to wire to complete a season sweep of three games over the Terriers with an 83–75 victory in the NEC tournament quarterfinals. The Knights' biggest lead was 16, at 30–14, in the first half, and they led, 45–30, at halftime. The Terriers cut the deficit to four points with 1:48 to play, after an 11–4 run, led by redshirt freshman Zion Bethea, but Fairleigh Dickinson hit their free throws down the stretch. Bethea and Tedrick Wilcox Jr. finished with 17 points each for St. Francis Brooklyn. Wilcox added six assists and three steals.

== Roster ==
2022–23 St. Francis Brooklyn Terriers men's basketball team
Players
Coaches

Pos.	#	Name	Height	Weight	Year	Hometown
G	0	Tedrick Wilcox Jr.	6 ft 6 in (1.98 m)	188 lb (85 kg)	Sr	Pawtucket, Rhode Island
SG	1	Zion Bethea	6 ft 4 in (1.93 m)	205 lb (93 kg)	RS Fr	South Orange, New Jersey
G	2	Di'Andre Howell-South	6 ft 4 in (1.93 m)	200 lb (91 kg)	RS Fr	Paterson, New Jersey
G	3	Rob Higgins	6 ft 1 in (1.85 m)	179 lb (81 kg)	Sr	Middletown, New Jersey
F	4	Syrus Grisby	6 ft 8 in (2.03 m)	—	Jr	Oklahoma City, Oklahoma
G	5	Larry Moreno	6 ft 0 in (1.83 m)	176 lb (80 kg)	Sr	Brooklyn, New York
G	10	Roy Clarke	6 ft 4 in (1.93 m)	210 lb (95 kg)	Jr	Brooklyn, New York
F	11	Josiah Harris	6 ft 8 in (2.03 m)	—	Jr	New Castle, Delaware
PG	12	Michael Myrie	6 ft 3 in (1.91 m)	—	Fr	Baltimore, Maryland
G	13	Nick Folk Jr.	6 ft 1 in (1.85 m)	160 lb (73 kg)	So	Coney Island, New York
F	14	Max Egner	6 ft 7 in (2.01 m)	209 lb (95 kg)	So	Woodside, New York
G	15	Trey Quartlebaum	6 ft 2 in (1.88 m)	187 lb (85 kg)	Sr	Lawrence, Kansas
F	20	Elijah Hardison	6 ft 7 in (2.01 m)	225 lb (102 kg)	Jr	Brooklyn, New York
F	23	Michael Parrotta	6 ft 5 in (1.96 m)	200 lb (91 kg)	RS Fr	Armonk, New York
F	25	Nuha Sagnia	6 ft 10 in (2.08 m)	—	Jr	Banjul, Gambia
G	34	Matthew Gonzalez	6 ft 2 in (1.88 m)	160 lb (73 kg)	So	Brooklyn, New York

Head coach

- Glenn Braica (Queens College)

Assistant coach(es)

- Ron Ganulin (LIU)
- Jonathan Blount (Queens College)

Legend

- (C) Team captain
- (S) Suspended
- (I) Ineligible
- (W) Walk-on
- Injured
- Current redshirt

Roster
Last update: November 9, 2022

== Schedule and results ==
Date time, TV	Rank^{#}	Opponent^{#}	Result	Record	High points	High rebounds	High assists	Site (attendance) city, state
Regular season
November 7, 2022*; 7:00 pm, NEC Front Row		Mount Saint Mary (NY)	W 96–56	1–0	24 – Bethea	14 – Sagnia	10 – Higgins	Daniel Lynch Gymnasium (114); Brooklyn Heights, NY
November 11, 2022*; 7:00 pm, BTN+		at Minnesota	L 54–72	1–1	10 – Quartlebaum	10 – Harris	3 – Wilcox Jr.	Williams Arena (8,232); Minneapolis, MN
November 13, 2022*; 3:00 pm, Tommies All Access		at St. Thomas (MN)	L 48–84	1–2	12 – Harris	16 – Harris	2 – Moreno	Schoenecker Arena (667); St. Paul, MN
November 19, 2022*; 2:00 pm, NEC Front Row		Saint Peter's	W 61–58	2–2	19 – Moreno	13 – Harris	3 – Clarke	Daniel Lynch Gymnasium (1,217); Brooklyn Heights, NY
November 23, 2022*; 6:30 pm, ACCN		at Miami (FL)	L 56–79	2–3	18 – Wilcox Jr.	5 – Tied	3 – Tied	Watsco Center (3,612); Coral Gables, FL
November 25, 2022*; 2:00 pm, ESPN+		at South Florida	L 60–75	2–4	21 – Wilcox Jr.	11 – Harris	4 – Higgins	Yuengling Center (2,241); Tampa, FL
November 30, 2022*; 7:30 pm, NEC Front Row		Delaware State	W 81–73	3–4	15 – Higgins	7 – Tied	7 – Wilcox Jr.	Pratt ARC (183); Brooklyn, NY
December 6, 2022*; 7:00 pm, NEC Front Row		Hartford	W 68–50	4–4	18 – Moreno	7 – Harris	4 – Tied	Pratt ARC (100); Brooklyn, NY
December 10, 2022*; 2:00 pm, ESPN3		at UMass Lowell	L 59–68	4–5	14 – Higgins	9 – Moreno	2 – Moreno	Tsongas Center (2,025); Lowell, MA
December 13, 2022*; 2:00 pm, NEC Front Row		Longwood	L 57–63	4–6	14 – Higgins	9 – Clarke	6 – Higgins	Pratt ARC (102); Brooklyn, NY
December 17, 2022*; 4:00 pm, Hartford Hawks All-Access		at Hartford	W 67–51	5–6	20 – Higgins	7 – Tied	3 – Moreno	Chase Arena (218); West Hartford, CT
December 22, 2022*; 2:00 pm, NEC Front Row		Medgar Evers	W 89–66	6–6	20 – Moreno	12 – Egner	8 – Higgins	Pratt ARC (104); Brooklyn, NY
December 31, 2022; 1:00 pm, NEC Front Row		at Central Connecticut	L 52–74	6–7 (0–1)	12 – Wilcox Jr.	12 – Harris	4 – Higgins	William H. Detrick Gymnasium (505); New Britain, CT
January 5, 2023; 1:00 pm, NEC Front Row		Fairleigh Dickinson	L 57–76	6–8 (0–2)	21 – Higgins	6 – Tied	4 – Higgins	Pratt ARC (225); Brooklyn, NY
January 7, 2023; 3:00 pm, NEC Front Row		at Merrimack	L 53–65	6–9 (0–3)	13 – Howell–South	9 – Howell–South	2 – Tied	Hammel Court; North Andover, MA
January 10, 2023*; 7:00 pm, NEC Front Row		Hartford	W 78–73	7–9	27 – Wilcox Jr.	6 – Harris	8 – Moreno	Pratt ARC (74); Brooklyn, NY
January 14, 2023; 1:00 pm, NEC Front Row		Sacred Heart	W 82–79	8–9 (1–3)	24 – Moreno	7 – Harris	6 – Moreno	Pratt ARC (125); Brooklyn, NY
January 16, 2023; 7:00 pm, NEC Front Row		at LIU	W 73–66	9–9 (2–3)	17 – Wilcox Jr.	8 – Harris	5 – Clarke	Steinberg Wellness Center (400); Brooklyn, NY
January 20, 2023; 7:00 pm, NEC Front Row		at Saint Francis (PA)	L 61–87	9–10 (2–4)	15 – Bethea	4 – Tied	1 – Tied	DeGol Arena (920); Loretto, PA
January 22, 2023; 1:00 pm, NEC Front Row		Merrimack	L 55–63	9–11 (2–5)	17 – Quartlebaum	8 – Grisby	3 – Clarke	Pratt ARC (137); Brooklyn, NY
January 26, 2023; 5:00 pm, CBSSN		at Wagner	W 65–56	10–11 (3–5)	21 – Wilcox Jr.	10 – Harris	3 – Clarke	Spiro Sports Center (1,327); Staten Island, NY
January 28, 2023; 1:00 pm, NEC Front Row		LIU; Battle of Brooklyn	W 71–59	11–11 (4–5)	18 – Bethea	14 – Harris	6 – Bethea	Pratt ARC (223); Brooklyn, NY
February 2, 2023; 2:00 pm, NEC Front Row		Central Connecticut	W 53–48	12–11 (5–5)	15 – Wilcox Jr.	15 – Harris	4 – Clarke	Pratt ARC (231); Brooklyn, NY
February 4, 2023; 1:00 pm, NEC Front Row		Stonehill	L 59–65	12–12 (5–6)	17 – Wilcox Jr.	10 – Harris	6 – Clarke	Pratt ARC (157); Brooklyn, NY
February 9, 2023; 2:00 pm, NEC Front Row		Wagner	W 64–62 ^{OT}	13–12 (6–6)	20 – Harris	12 – Howell-South	5 – Clarke	Pratt ARC (143); Brooklyn, NY
February 11, 2023; 2:00 pm, NEC Front Row		at Stonehill	L 51–62	13–13 (6–7)	15 – Harris	10 – Harris	3 – Harris	Merkert Gymnasium (746); Easton, MA
February 16, 2023; 2:00 pm, NEC Front Row		Saint Francis (PA)	L 64–72	13–14 (6–8)	20 – Bethea	11 – Harris	3 – Quartlebaum	Pratt ARC (189); Brooklyn, NY
February 23, 2023; 7:00 pm, NEC Front Row		at Sacred Heart	W 70–63	14–14 (7–8)	20 – Clarke	17 – Harris	5 – Clarke	William H. Pitt Center (582); Fairfield, CT
February 25, 2023; 1:00 pm, NEC Front Row		at Fairleigh Dickinson	L 69–86	14–15 (7–9)	18 – Howell-South	7 – Harris	6 – Howell-South	Rothman Center (923); Hackensack, NJ
NEC Tournament
March 1, 2023; 7:00 pm, NEC Front Row	(7)	at (2) Fairleigh Dickinson; Quarterfinals	L 75–83	14–16	17 – Tied	7 – Harris	6 – Wilcox Jr.	Rothman Center (887); Hackensack, NJ
*Non-conference game. ^{#}Rankings from AP Poll. (#) Tournament seedings in parentheses. All times are in Eastern.
