= 2022–23 Central Connecticut Blue Devils men's basketball team =

American college basketball season

2022–23 Central Connecticut Blue Devils men's basketball
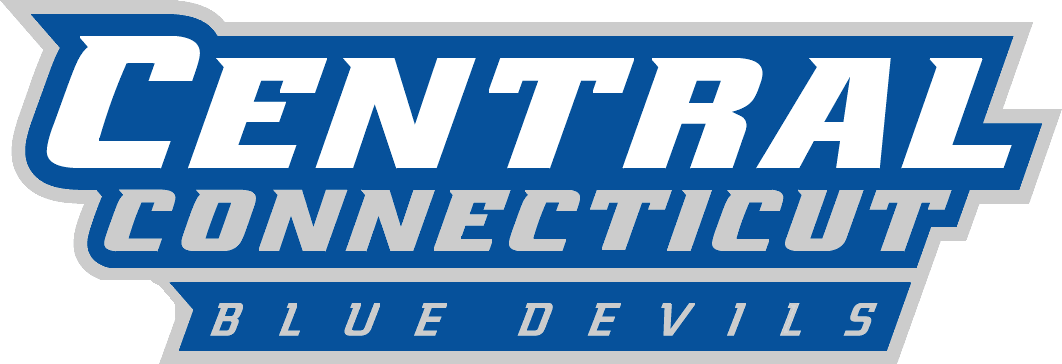
- Conference: Northeast Conference
- Record: 10–22 (7–9 NEC)
- Head coach: Patrick Sellers (2nd season)
- Assistant coaches: Ben Wood; Lenny Jefferson; Ryan Olander
- Home arena: William H. Detrick Gymnasium

2022–23 Northeast Conference men's basketball standings
	Conf.				Overall
Team	W		L	PCT	W		L	PCT
Merrimack*†	12	–	4	.750	18	–	16	.529
Fairleigh Dickinson^	10	–	6	.625	21	–	16	.568
Stonehill**	10	–	6	.625	14	–	17	.452
Saint Francis (PA)	9	–	7	.563	13	–	18	.419
Sacred Heart	8	–	8	.500	16	–	17	.485
Wagner	8	–	8	.500	15	–	13	.536
Central Connecticut	7	–	9	.438	10	–	22	.313
St. Francis Brooklyn	7	–	9	.438	14	–	16	.467
LIU	1	–	15	.063	3	–	26	.103
† 2023 NEC tournament winner: * ineligible for the 2023 NCAA tournament due to transition period; ** ineligible for both the 2023 NEC tournament and the 2023 NCAA tournament due to transition period; ^ received automatic bid for the 2023 NCAA tournament as conference tournament runner-up, due to Merrimack's ineligibility

The 2022–23 Central Connecticut Blue Devils men's basketball team represented Central Connecticut State University in the 2022–23 NCAA Division I men's basketball season. The Blue Devils, led by 2nd-year head coach Patrick Sellers, played their home games at the William H. Detrick Gymnasium in New Britain, Connecticut as members of the Northeast Conference.

== Previous season ==
The Blue Devils finished the 2021–22 season 8–24, 5–13 in NEC play to finish tied for eighth place. As the 9 seed, they defeated 8 seed Fairleigh Dickinson in the opening round of the NEC Tournament, before falling to top-seeded Bryant in the quarterfinals.

== Roster ==
2022–23 Central Connecticut Blue Devils men's basketball team
Players
Coaches

Pos.	#	Name	Height	Weight	Year	Hometown
G	0	Joe Ostrowsky	6 ft 0 in (1.83 m)	175 lb (79 kg)	So	Mount Pleasant, Michigan
G	1	Jay Rodgers	6 ft 3 in (1.91 m)	185 lb (84 kg)	Jr	Pickerington, Ohio
G	2	Davonte Sweatman	5 ft 8 in (1.73 m)	145 lb (66 kg)	So	Boston, Massachusetts
G	3	Nigel Scantlebury	6 ft 0 in (1.83 m)	170 lb (77 kg)	Sr	Rochester, New York
G	5	Kellen Amos	6 ft 7 in (2.01 m)	190 lb (86 kg)	Sr	Houston, Texas
G	10	Tre Breland	6 ft 4 in (1.93 m)	190 lb (86 kg)	Jr	Hamden, Connecticut
F	11	Abdul Momoh	6 ft 7 in (2.01 m)	235 lb (107 kg)	So	Carteret, New Jersey
C	12	Arian Dehnavi	6 ft 10 in (2.08 m)	215 lb (98 kg)	Jr	Montreal, Quebec
G	13	TJ Holloway	6 ft 4 in (1.93 m)	200 lb (91 kg)	Fr	Orange, Connecticut
G	14	Kyle Rocker	6 ft 2 in (1.88 m)	180 lb (82 kg)	So	Lawrence, Massachusetts
F/C	15	Jayden Brown	6 ft 8 in (2.03 m)	215 lb (98 kg)	So	Providence, Rhode Island
G	20	Dion Perkins	6 ft 3 in (1.91 m)	170 lb (77 kg)	Fr	Seymour, Connecticut
G/F	21	Andre Snoddy	6 ft 6 in (1.98 m)	210 lb (95 kg)	So	Melville, New York
F	44	Brody Limric	6 ft 9 in (2.06 m)	200 lb (91 kg)	RS Fr	Glastonbury, Connecticut

Head coach

- Patrick Sellers (Central Connecticut)

Assistant coach(es)

- Ben Wood (Connecticut)
- Lenny Jefferson (Central Connecticut)
- Ryan Olander (Fairfield)

Legend

- (C) Team captain
- (S) Suspended
- (I) Ineligible
- (W) Walk-on
- Injured
- Current redshirt

Roster
Last update: October 28, 2022

== Schedule and results ==
Date time, TV	Rank^{#}	Opponent^{#}	Result	Record	Site (attendance) city, state
Regular season
November 7, 2022*; 7:30 pm, ESPN+/NESN+		at UMass	L 67–94	0–1	Mullins Center (4,963); Amherst, MA
November 11, 2022*; 7:00 pm, ESPN3		at Manhattan	Postponed due to court conditions		Draddy Gymnasium; Riverdale, NY
November 13, 2022*; 1:00 pm, NEC Front Row		Quinnipiac	L 70–72	0–2	William H. Detrick Gymnasium (1,404); New Britain, CT
November 15, 2022*; 7:00 pm, FS2		at St. John's	L 74–91	0–3	Carnesecca Arena (3,304); Queens, NY
November 19, 2022*; 1:00 pm, ESPN3		vs. Lafayette	L 50–55	0–4	Chesapeake Employers Insurance Arena (87); Catonsville, MD
November 20, 2022*; 1:00 pm, ESPN+		at UMBC	L 76–78	0–5	Chesapeake Employers Insurance Arena (869); Catonsville, MD
November 23, 2022*; 3:30 pm, NEC Front Row		Maine	L 58–66	0–6	William H. Detrick Gymnasium (1,011); New Britain, CT
November 26, 2022*; 2:00 pm, BTN+		at Rutgers	L 49–83	0–7	Jersey Mike's Arena (7,500); Piscataway, NJ
November 29, 2022*; 7:00 pm, NEC Front Row		Brown	L 51–59	0–8	William H. Detrick Gymnasium (843); New Britain, CT
December 3, 2022*; 6:00 p.m., ESPN+		at Holy Cross	L 57–63	0–9	Hart Center (1,263); Worcester, MA
December 9, 2022*; 7:00 pm, NEC Front Row		Dartmouth	W 59–50	1–9	William H. Detrick Gymnasium (1,007); New Britain, CT
December 11, 2022*; 1:00 pm, ESPN+		at Fordham	L 77–90	1–10	Rose Hill Gymnasium; Bronx, NY
December 16, 2022*; 7:00 pm, ESPN+		at Manhattan; Rescheduled from November 11	W 78–67	2–10	Draddy Gymnasium (572); Riverdale, NY
December 20, 2022*; 7:00 pm, NEC Front Row		Army	L 55–66	2–11	William H. Detrick Gymnasium (584); New Britain, CT
December 22, 2022*; 7:00 pm, ESPN+		at Saint Joseph's	L 66–83	2–12	Hagan Arena (527); Philadelphia, PA
December 29, 2022; 7:00 pm, NEC Front Row		at Saint Francis (PA)	L 72–80	2–13 (0–1)	DeGol Arena (401); Loretto, PA
December 31, 2022; 1:00 pm, NEC Front Row		St. Francis Brooklyn	W 74–52	3–13 (1–1)	William H. Detrick Gymnasium (505); New Britain, CT
January 5, 2023; 7:00 pm, NEC Front Row		LIU	W 78–59	4–13 (2–1)	William H. Detrick Gymnasium (314); New Britain, CT
January 7, 2023; 2:00 pm, NEC Front Row		at Stonehill	L 49–51	4–14 (2–2)	Merkert Gymnasium (631); Easton, MA
January 14, 2023; 1:00 pm, NEC Front Row		Fairleigh Dickinson	L 80–88	4–15 (2–3)	William H. Detrick Gymnasium (1,021); New Britain, CT
January 20, 2023; 7:00 pm, NEC Front Row		at Wagner	L 50–72	4–16 (2–4)	Spiro Sports Center (817); Staten Island, NY
January 22, 2023; 12:00 pm, NEC Front Row		at LIU	W 58–42	5–16 (3–4)	Steinberg Wellness Center (215); Brooklyn, NY
January 26, 2023; 7:00 pm, NEC Front Row		Merrimack	L 61–64	5–17 (3–5)	William H. Detrick Gymnasium (1,015); New Britain, CT
January 28, 2023; 1:00 pm, NEC Front Row		Saint Francis (PA)	W 88–74	6–17 (4–5)	William H. Detrick Gymnasium (722); New Britain, CT
February 2, 2023; 2:00 pm, NEC Front Row		at St. Francis Brooklyn	L 48–53	6–18 (4–6)	Pratt ARC (231); Brooklyn, NY
February 4, 2023; 2:00 pm, NEC Front Row		at Sacred Heart	L 65–78	6–19 (4–7)	William H. Pitt Center (1,033); Fairfield, CT
February 8, 2023*; 7:00 pm, NEC Front Row		at Hartford; Rivalry	W 82–73	7–19	Chase Arena (548); West Hartford, CT
February 11, 2023; 5:00 pm, NEC Front Row		at Fairleigh Dickinson	W 77–73	8–19 (5–7)	Rothman Center (519); Hackensack, NJ
February 16, 2023; 7:00 pm, NEC Front Row		Wagner	W 58–57	9–19 (6–7)	William H. Detrick Gymnasium (1,002); New Britain, CT
February 18, 2023; 1:00 pm, NEC Front Row		Stonehill	W 94–90 ^{3OT}	10–19 (7–7)	William H. Detrick Gymnasium (929); New Britain, CT
February 23, 2023; 7:00 pm, NEC Front Row		at Merrimack	L 54–70	10–20 (7–8)	Hammel Court (1,022); North Andover, MA
February 25, 2023; 1:00 pm, NEC Front Row		Sacred Heart	L 67–69	10–21 (7–9)	William H. Detrick Gymnasium (703); New Britain, CT
NEC Tournament
March 1, 2023; 7:00 pm, NEC Front Row	(6)	at (3) St. Francis (PA); Quarterfinals	L 69–83	10–22	DeGol Arena (1,011); Loretto, PA
*Non-conference game. ^{#}Rankings from AP Poll. (#) Tournament seedings in parentheses. All times are in Eastern.
