= 2022–23 Wagner Seahawks men's basketball team =

American college basketball season

2022–23 Wagner Seahawks men's basketball
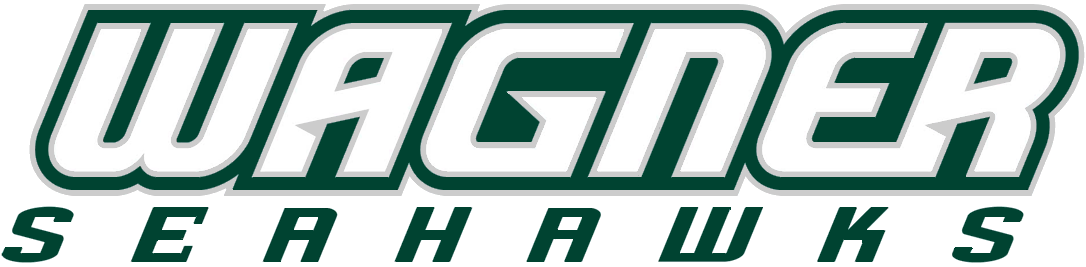
- Conference: Northeast Conference
- Record: 15–13 (8–8 NEC)
- Head coach: Donald Copeland (1st season)
- Assistant coaches: Pete Lappas; Kevin Jones; Scott Rodgers
- Home arena: Spiro Sports Center

2022–23 Northeast Conference men's basketball standings
	Conf.				Overall
Team	W		L	PCT	W		L	PCT
Merrimack*†	12	–	4	.750	18	–	16	.529
Fairleigh Dickinson^	10	–	6	.625	21	–	16	.568
Stonehill**	10	–	6	.625	14	–	17	.452
Saint Francis (PA)	9	–	7	.563	13	–	18	.419
Sacred Heart	8	–	8	.500	16	–	17	.485
Wagner	8	–	8	.500	15	–	13	.536
Central Connecticut	7	–	9	.438	10	–	22	.313
St. Francis Brooklyn	7	–	9	.438	14	–	16	.467
LIU	1	–	15	.063	3	–	26	.103
† 2023 NEC tournament winner: * ineligible for the 2023 NCAA tournament due to transition period; ** ineligible for both the 2023 NEC tournament and the 2023 NCAA tournament due to transition period; ^ received automatic bid for the 2023 NCAA tournament as conference tournament runner-up, due to Merrimack's ineligibility

The 2022–23 Wagner Seahawks men's basketball team represented Wagner College in the 2022–23 NCAA Division I men's basketball season. The Seahawks, led by first-year head coach Donald Copeland, played their home games at the Spiro Sports Center in Staten Island, New York as a member of the Northeast Conference.

== Previous season ==
The Seahawks finished the 2021–22 season 21–6, 15–3 in NEC play to finish in second place. As the No. 2 seed in the NEC tournament, they defeated Saint Francis (PA) and LIU, before falling to Bryant in the championship game.

On April 12, it was announced that head coach Bashir Mason would be leaving the program to become the next head coach at Saint Peter's. On April 21, Seton Hall assistant and former Wagner assistant under Mason, Donald Copeland, was named as Mason's successor.

== Roster ==
2022–23 Wagner Seahawks men's basketball team
Players
Coaches

Pos.	#	Name	Height	Weight	Year	Previous school	Hometown
G	0	Rahmir Moore	6 ft 3 in (1.91 m)	205 lb (93 kg)	Jr	Saint Joseph's	Philadelphia, Pennsylvania
G	1	Javier Ezquerra	6 ft 1 in (1.85 m)	175 lb (79 kg)	So	IMG Academy	San Juan, Puerto Rico
G	3	DeLonnie Hunt	6 ft 0 in (1.83 m)	170 lb (77 kg)	Jr	Rock Creek Christian	Upper Marlboro, Maryland
G	4	Lavell Brodnex	6 ft 5 in (1.96 m)	180 lb (82 kg)	So	Murray State College	Saginaw, Michigan
G	5	Jordan Mason	6 ft 4 in (1.93 m)	220 lb (100 kg)	Sr	Dexter Southfield	Boston, Massachusetts
F	10	Darrius Hughes	6 ft 7 in (2.01 m)	220 lb (100 kg)	Sr	Omaha	Kansas City, Missouri
G	11	Brandon Brown	6 ft 5 in (1.96 m)	190 lb (86 kg)	Sr	Arkansas–Pine Bluff	Memphis, Tennessee
G	12	Zaire Williams	6 ft 4 in (1.93 m)	190 lb (86 kg)	So	Eagle Academy	Brooklyn, New York
G	13	Julian Brown	6 ft 1 in (1.85 m)	190 lb (86 kg)	Fr	Bergen Catholic HS	Middletown, New York
F	22	Ja'Mier Fletcher	6 ft 7 in (2.01 m)	245 lb (111 kg)	Sr	First Love Christian Academy	Pittsburgh, Pennsylvania
F	24	Rob Taylor II	6 ft 7 in (2.01 m)	220 lb (100 kg)	So	St. Mark's	Brooklyn, New York
F	32	Keyontae Lewis	6 ft 9 in (2.06 m)	255 lb (116 kg)	Fr	Lloyd C. Bird HS	Chesterfield, Virginia
F	55	Jahbril Price-Noel	6 ft 7 in (2.01 m)	215 lb (98 kg)	GS	Pacific	Scarborough, Ontario

Head coach

- Donald Copeland (Seton Hall)

Assistant coach(es)

- Pete Lappas (Boston College)
- Kevin Jones (Bowie State)
- Scott Rodgers (Drexel)

Legend

- (C) Team captain
- (S) Suspended
- (I) Ineligible
- (W) Walk-on
- Injured
- Current redshirt

Roster
Last update: December 10, 2022

== Schedule and results ==
Date time, TV	Rank^{#}	Opponent^{#}	Result	Record	High points	High rebounds	High assists	Site (attendance) city, state
Non-conference regular season
November 7, 2022*; 7:00 pm, ESPN+		at Temple	W 76–73	1–0	19 – Hunt	11 – B. Brown	3 – 3 Tied	Liacouras Center (4,707); Philadelphia, PA
November 12, 2022*; 3:00 pm, ESPN+		at La Salle	L 69–77	1–1	20 – Williams	9 – 2 Tied	7 – Hunt	Tom Gola Arena (2,517); Philadelphia, PA
November 14, 2022*; 7:00 pm, NEC Front Row		Neumann	W 82–52	2–1	20 – Ezquerra	12 – B. Brown	4 – Hunt	Spiro Sports Center (532); Staten Island, NY
November 18, 2022*; 7:00 pm, NEC Front Row		Fairfield	W 68–52	3–1	17 – Hunt	12 – B. Brown	5 – Ezquerra	Spiro Sports Center (1,024); Staten Island, NY
November 20, 2022*; 3:00 pm, FS1		at Seton Hall	L 44–82	3–2	15 – Moore	5 – Lewis	2 – 2 Tied	Prudential Center (8,811); Newark, NJ
November 27, 2022*; 2:00 pm, ESPN+		at NJIT	W 62–57	4–2	19 – Price-Noel	7 – Price-Noel	3 – 2 Tied	Wellness and Events Center (316); Newark, NJ
December 3, 2022*; 1:00 pm, ESPN+		at Army	L 64–75	4–3	17 – Hunt	8 – B. Brown	3 – 2 Tied	Christl Arena (635); West Point, NY
December 6, 2022*; 7:00 pm, ESPN+		at Fordham	L 59–72	4–4	20 – Moore	6 – B. Brown	6 – Hunt	Rose Hill Gymnasium (660); Bronx, NY
December 15, 2022*; 7:00 pm, NEC Front Row		Stony Brook	W 58–55	5–4	13 – 2 Tied	10 – B. Brown	3 – 2 Tied	Spiro Sports Center (742); Staten Island, NY
December 20, 2022*; 6:00 pm, NEC Front Row		at Delaware State	W 58–51	6–4	22 – Hunt	13 – Brown	2 – 2 Tied	Memorial Hall; Dover, DE
December 22, 2022*; 5:00 pm, NEC Front Row		Gwynedd Mercy	W 89–55	7–4	13 – Hunt	7 – 2 Tied	9 – Ezquerra	Spiro Sports Center (103); Staten Island, NY
NEC regular season
December 29, 2022; 1:00 pm, NEC Front Row		at LIU	W 69–61	8–4 (1–0)	13 – Ezquerra	11 – B. Brown	7 – Hunt	Barclays Center (375); Brooklyn, NY
December 31, 2022; 1:00 pm, NEC Front Row		Merrimack	L 48–58	8–5 (1–1)	14 – B. Brown	9 – B. Brown	3 – 2 Tied	Spiro Sports Center (572); Staten Island, NY
January 5, 2023; 7:00 pm, NEC Front Row		at Stonehill	L 58–62	8–6 (1–2)	17 – Taylor II	11 – 2 Tied	3 – Ezquerra	Merkert Gymnasium (411); Easton, MA
January 7, 2023; 4:00 pm, NEC Front Row		Saint Francis (PA)	L 63–68	8–7 (1–3)	20 – Hunt	11 – B. Brown	4 – 3 Tied	Spiro Sports Center (479); Staten Island, NY
January 16, 2023; 7:00 pm, NEC Front Row		at Merrimack	W 62–57	9–7 (2–3)	19 – Hunt	9 – B. Brown	3 – Hunt	Hammel Court (829); North Andover, MA
January 20, 2023; 7:00 pm, NEC Front Row		Central Connecticut	W 72–50	10–7 (3–3)	17 – Taylor II	8 – Ezquerra	5 – Ezquerra	Spiro Sports Center (817); Staten Island, NY
January 22, 2023; 1:00 pm, NEC Front Row		Sacred Heart	W 68–58	11–7 (4–3)	19 – Taylor II	9 – B. Brown	3 – Williams	Spiro Sports Center (518); Staten Island, NY
January 26, 2023; 5:00 pm, NEC Front Row		St. Francis Brooklyn	L 56–65	11–8 (4–4)	18 – Moore	10 – B. Brown	3 – Ezquerra	Spiro Sports Center (1,327); Staten Island, NY
February 2, 2023; 7:00 pm, NEC Front Row		at Sacred Heart	L 56–65	11–9 (4–5)	19 – Hunt	10 – B. Brown	3 – 2 Tied	William H. Pitt Center (715); Fairfield, CT
February 4, 2023; 1:00 pm, NEC Front Row		at Fairleigh Dickinson	W 83–79	12–9 (5–5)	12 – 3 Tied	8 – B. Brown	4 – 3 Tied	Rothman Center (1,075); Hackensack, NJ
February 9, 2023; 2:00 pm, NEC Front Row		at St. Francis Brooklyn	L 62–64 ^{OT}	12–10 (5–6)	16 – B. Brown	10 – B. Brown	3 – 2 Tied	Pratt ARC (143); Brooklyn, NY
February 11, 2023; 1:00 pm, NEC Front Row		LIU	W 58–46	13–10 (6–6)	12 – 2 Tied	7 – 2 Tied	5 – Ezquerra	Spiro Sports Center (1,218); Staten Island, NY
February 16, 2023; 7:00 pm, NEC Front Row		at Central Connecticut	L 57–58	13–11 (6–7)	19 – Ezquerra	10 – B. Brown	4 – Ezquerra	William H. Detrick Gymnasium (1,002); New Britain, CT
February 18, 2023; 4:00 pm, NEC Front Row		Fairleigh Dickinson	L 48–66	13–12 (6–8)	13 – Fletcher	5 – Fletcher	3 – Ezquerra	Spiro Sports Center (606); Staten Island, NY
February 23, 2023; 7:00 pm, NEC Front Row		Stonehill	W 54–44	14–12 (7–8)	13 – 2 Tied	11 – B. Brown	3 – Ezquerra	Spiro Sports Center (1,257); Staten Island, NY
February 25, 2023; 4:00 pm, NEC Front Row		at Saint Francis (PA)	W 68–58	15–12 (8–8)	17 – Hunt	15 – B. Brown	3 – J. Brown	DeGol Arena (954); Loretto, PA
NEC tournament
March 1, 2023; 7:00 pm, NEC Front Row	(5)	at (4) Sacred Heart; Quarterfinals	L 55–67	15–13	15 – Brown	15 – Brown	3 – Ezquerra	William H. Pitt Center (398); Fairfield, CT
*Non-conference game. ^{#}Rankings from AP Poll. (#) Tournament seedings in parentheses. All times are in Eastern.
