= 2023 Northeast Conference men's basketball tournament =

- Classification: Division I
- Season: 2022–23
- Teams: 8
- Site: Campus sites
- Champions: Merrimack (1st title)
- Winning coach: Joe Gallo (1st title)
- MVP: Ziggy Reid (Merrimack)
- Television: NEC Front Row, ESPN3, ESPN2

The 2023 Northeast Conference Men's Basketball Tournament was the postseason men's basketball tournament for the Northeast Conference for the 2022–23 NCAA Division I men's basketball season. The tournament took place on three dates between March 1 and 7, 2023, and all tournament games were played in the home arenas of the higher-seeded school. The winner, Merrimack, did not receive the conference's automatic bid to the 2023 NCAA Division I men's basketball tournament due to not being eligible because of a transition from Division II. Instead, the runner-up, Fairleigh Dickinson, was awarded the conference's automatic bid by winning the seminfinal game over Saint Francis (PA).

2022–23 Northeast Conference men's basketball standings
	Conf.				Overall
Team	W		L	PCT	W		L	PCT
Merrimack*†	12	–	4	.750	18	–	16	.529
Fairleigh Dickinson^	10	–	6	.625	21	–	16	.568
Stonehill**	10	–	6	.625	14	–	17	.452
Saint Francis (PA)	9	–	7	.563	13	–	18	.419
Sacred Heart	8	–	8	.500	16	–	17	.485
Wagner	8	–	8	.500	15	–	13	.536
Central Connecticut	7	–	9	.438	10	–	22	.313
St. Francis Brooklyn	7	–	9	.438	14	–	16	.467
LIU	1	–	15	.063	3	–	26	.103
† 2023 NEC tournament winner: * ineligible for the 2023 NCAA tournament due to transition period; ** ineligible for both the 2023 NEC tournament and the 2023 NCAA tournament due to transition period; ^ received automatic bid for the 2023 NCAA tournament as conference tournament runner-up, due to Merrimack's ineligibility

There was no defending champion for the 2023 tournament, as Bryant moved to the America East Conference after the 2021–22 academic year.

== Seeds ==
All eight eligible teams of the nine members of the conference qualified. Effective for the 2022–23 academic year, NEC teams transitioning from Division II became eligible for the NEC tournament during their third and fourth years of the transition period. If a reclassifying institution won the NEC tournament championship, the conference's automatic bid to the NCAA tournament went to the NEC tournament runner up. The conference's rule change regarding reclassifying institutions resulted in Merrimack being eligible for the 2023 NEC tournament, since it was in its fourth transition year.

Teams were seeded by record within the conference, with a tiebreaker system to seed teams with identical conference records.

Stonehill College joined the Northeast Conference from the Division II Northeast-10 Conference. Stonehill is ineligible for the NCAA tournament until the 2026–27 season during its four-year reclassification period and won't be eligible for the NEC tournament until the 2024–25 season.

Seed	School	Conf.	Tiebreaker
1	Merrimack	12–4	
2	Fairleigh Dickinson	10–6	
3	Saint Francis (PA)	9–7	
4	Sacred Heart	8–8	2–2 vs. CCSU/SFC
5	Wagner	8–8	1–3 vs. CCSU/SFC
6	Central Connecticut	7–9	2–2 vs. FDU/Stonehill
7	St. Francis Brooklyn	7–9	0–4 vs. FDU/Stonehill
8	LIU	1–15	

== Schedule ==
Game	Time*	Matchup	Score	Television
Quarterfinals – Wednesday, March 1
1	7:00 pm	No. 8 LIU at No. 1 Merrimack	76–91	ESPN3/NEC Front Row
2	7:00 pm	No. 7 St. Francis Brooklyn at No. 2 Fairleigh Dickinson	75–83	ESPN3/NEC Front Row
3	7:00 pm	No. 6 Central Connecticut at No. 3 Saint Francis (PA)	69–83	ESPN3/NEC Front Row
4	7:00 pm	No. 5 Wagner at No. 4 Sacred Heart	55–67	ESPN3/NEC Front Row
Semifinals – Saturday, March 4
5	6:00 pm	No. 4 Sacred Heart at No. 1 Merrimack	57–71	ESPN3
6	8:00 pm	No. 3 Saint Francis (PA) at No. 2 Fairleigh Dickinson	50–70	ESPN3
Championship – Tuesday, March 7
7	7:00 pm	No. 2 Fairleigh Dickinson at No. 1 Merrimack	66–67	ESPN2
*Game times in ET. Rankings denote tournament seed

== Tournament notes ==
=== Quarterfinals ===
Ziggy Reid had a career-high 33 points, including 20 in the first half, to lead Merrimack to a 91–76 quarterfinal win over LIU. Reid shot 11 for 13 from the field, including 6 for 7 from three-point range, and added nine rebounds for the Warriors, who led 54–33, at halftime. Midway through the first half, Merrimack stretched a six-point lead to 18 with a 12–0 run, which started and concluded with three-pointers by Reid. Javon Bennett scored 26 points on 10-for-13 shooting, including 4 for 5 from beyond the arc, and added three steals for the Warriors, while Jordan Minor contributed 17 points, five rebounds, five steals, four blocks and two assists. Jacob Johnson had 16 points and nine rebounds for the Sharks.

In what would prove to be the final men's basketball game in the history of St. Francis Brooklyn, Fairleigh Dickinson scored the first seven points and led wire to wire to complete a season sweep of three games over the Terriers with an 83–75 victory. The Knights were led by Sean Moore and Ansley Almonor, who scored 18 points each. Almonor shot 7 for 11, including 4 for 6 from three-point range, and added five rebounds. Moore had seven rebounds and five steals for Fairleigh Dickinson. The Knights' biggest lead was 16, at 30–14, in the first half, and they led, 45–30, at halftime. St. Francis Brooklyn cut the deficit to four points with 1:48 to play, after an 11–4 run, led by redshirt freshman Zion Bethea, but the Knights hit their free throws down the stretch. Bethea and Tedrick Wilcox Jr. finished with 17 points each for the Terriers. Wilcox added six assists and three steals.

Josh Cohen's 25 points and 12 rebounds led Saint Francis (PA) past Central Connecticut, 83–69. Trailing 26–24, the Red Flash got eight points from Ronell Giles, Jr. during a 15–2 run that helped them secure a 39–30 lead at the break. Cohen had 15 of his points in the first half. After Saint Francis pushed their lead to 14, at 51–37 with 14:26 to play, the Blue Devils got no closer than an 11-point deficit the rest of the way. Maxwell Land scored 23 points, on 9-for-15 shooting, and Giles finished with 14 points for the Red Flash. Jayden Brown and Kellen Amos each scored 13 points for Central Connecticut. Brown added six rebounds and two blocks. Andre Snoddy contributed 12 points and 12 rebounds for the Blue Devils.

Tanner Thomas and Nico Galette scored 14 points each to lead Sacred Heart to a 67–55 victory over Wagner. The Pioneers used a 10–2 run to expand their 46–44 lead and go up by 10 points with 5:45 to play. Thomas added eight rebounds for Sacred Heart. Brandon Brown scored 15 points and grabbed 15 rebounds to lead the Seahawks.

=== Semifinals ===
Jordan Minor had 18 points, 12 rebounds, four steals, and six blocks to lead Merrimack to a 71–60 victory over Sacred Heart. With the game tied at 9, Devon Savage, who had eight points in the first half, hit a layup and a three-pointer to put the Warriors ahead for good. A Minor layup extended Merrimack's lead to 23–13. The Pioneers used a 7–0 run late in the first half to pull within a single point, but baskets by Javon Bennett and Jordan Derkack in the closing moments gave the Warriors a 33–28 lead at the break. Merrimack put the game away with a 14–3 run in the second half, which included two dunks by Minor and gave them a 60–43 lead with 6:24 to play. Bennett had 17 points, five assists and six steals for the Warriors. Sacred Heart got 15 points, 13 rebounds and two blocks from Tanner Thomas. Nico Galette added 13 points and seven rebounds, and Bryce Johnson had 12 points, 14 rebounds and two steals for the Pioneers.

Since the NEC's automatic bid to the 2023 NCAA Tournament was given to the tournament runner-up, if an ineligible team won the NEC Tournament, Merrimack's victory in the semifinals, which was completed before the second semifinal between Fairleigh Dickinson and Saint Francis (PA) began, meant that both teams knew that the winner of their semifinal game would get the automatic bid. In the closing minutes of a tight first half, Fairleigh Dickinson went on an 8–2 run to build a 10-point lead, but Maxwell Land's buzzer-beating deep three-pointer left the Knights up by 35–28 at halftime. Fairleigh Dickinson took control of the game in the opening minutes of the second half and built a 45–30 lead. A 9–2 run extended the Knights' lead from 12 to 19 points. Josh Cohen, who finished with 12 points and eight rebounds, fueled an 8–0 Red Flash run that cut the Fairleigh Dickinson lead to 12 points with 6:06 to play, but Saint Francis got no closer the rest of the way, and the Knights cruised to a 70–50 victory that clinched a berth in the NCAA Tournament. Demetre Roberts had a game-high 18 points and added five assists for Fairleigh Dickinson, while Ansley Almonor contributed 15 points and seven rebounds. Land finished the game with 13 points, including three three-pointers, for the Red Flash.

=== Final ===
With the NEC's automatic bid to the NCAA Tournament already settled, the top two seeds in the tournament, Merrimack and Fairleigh Dickinson, met for the conference tournament championship. The Warriors closed the game on an 8–0 run, capped by a Jordan McKoy free through with 8.3 seconds remaining, that gave them a 67–66 lead. After McKoy missed his second free throw, Demetre Roberts dribbled up the floor but was long on a contested three-pointer from the top of the key at the buzzer, sealing the victory and first NEC tournament title for Merrimack. The game featured 11 lead changes during the first 37 minutes and was close throughout, but a Grant Singleton three-pointer gave the Knights a 66–59 lead, their largest of the game, with 2:59 to play. Tournament MVP Ziggy Reid scored a three-point basket 16 seconds after Singleton's shot. Jordan Minor then tied the game at 66 with 39.7 seconds left with a free-throw that completed a three-point play. On the ensuing possession, Singleton drove the lane and passed to Ansley Almonor in the corner for a three-point attempt that was long. McKoy was fouled on the rebound, setting up his winning free throw. Reid scored a game-high 23 points and added six rebounds. Minor had 19 points, seven rebounds, five assists and three blocked shots for the Warriors. Roberts led the Knights with 15 points and six assists, and Cameron Tweedy added 13 points off the bench.

== Bracket ==
Teams were reseeded after each round with highest remaining seeds receiving home-court advantage.

Quarterfinals; Wednesday, March 1 ESPN3/NEC Front Row
1	Merrimack	91
8	LIU	76
3	Saint Francis (PA)	83
6	Central Connecticut	69
(Pairings are reseeded after the first round)
2	Fairleigh Dickinson	83
7	St. Francis Brooklyn	75
4	Sacred Heart	67
5	Wagner	55

Semifinals; Saturday, March 4 ESPN3/NEC Front Row
1	Merrimack	71
4	Sacred Heart	57
2	Fairleigh Dickinson#	70
3	Saint Francis (PA)	50

Championship; Tuesday, March 7 ESPN2
1	Merrimack	67
2	Fairleigh Dickinson	66

# Due to Merrimack's ineligibility, the semifinal between Saint Francis and Fairleigh Dickinson decided the NEC's automatic bid to the NCAA tournament.

== Awards and honors ==
Tournament MVP: Ziggy Reid

First Team
- Ziggy Reid, Merrimack
- Javon Bennett, Merrimack
- Jordan Minor, Merrimack
- Ansley Almonor, Fairleigh Dickinson
- Demetre Roberts, Fairleigh Dickinson
