= Josh Cohen (basketball) =

American basketball player (born 2001)

Free agent
- Position: Center

Personal information
- Born: May 29, 2001 (age 25)
- Listed height: 6 ft 10 in (2.08 m)
- Listed weight: 220 lb (100 kg)

Career information
- High school: Christian Brothers Academy (Lincroft, New Jersey)
- College: Saint Francis (PA) (2020–2023); UMass (2023–2024); USC (2024–2025)
- NBA draft: 2025: undrafted
- Playing career: 2025–present

Career history
- 2025–2026: Sioux Falls Skyforce

Career highlights
- First-team All-Atlantic 10 (2024); NEC Co-player of the Year (2023); First-team All-NEC (2023); NEC Most Improved Player (2022)

Joshua Cohen (born May 29, 2001) is an American basketball player who most recently played for the Sioux Falls Skyforce of the NBA G League. He played college basketball for the Saint Francis Red Flash, UMass Minutemen and USC Trojans.

== High school career ==
Raised in the Lincroft section of Middletown Township, New Jersey, Cohen attended Christian Brothers Academy and was coached by Geoff Billett. He averaged 21 points per game as a senior, earning all-conference honors. Cohen finished his career with 1,224 points. He committed to play college basketball at Saint Francis Red Flash.

== College career ==
Cohen redshirted his true freshman season and averaged 5.7 points and 4.6 rebounds per game as a redshirt freshman. As a sophomore, he averaged 12.9 points and seven rebounds per game, earning NEC Most Improved Player honors. Cohen was named NEC Co-player of the Year as a junior, alongside Jordan Minor of Merrimack. Cohen averaged 21.8 points and 8.3 rebounds per game with seven double-doubles and two 40-point games. Following the season, he transferred to UMass, choosing the Minutemen over Penn State, Iowa and Florida.

In his single season at UMass, Cohen averaged 16 points and seven rebounds per game, earning First Team All-Atlantic 10 honors. He initially transferred as a graduate student to Arkansas, before flipping his commitment when coach Eric Musselman was hired at USC. In 2024-25 with USC, Cohen averaged 5.9 points, 2.5 rebounds, and 1.1 assists per game.

== Professional career ==
Cohen went undrafted in the 2025 NBA Draft. He was selected with the 14th pick in the 2025 NBA G League draft by the Sioux Falls Skyforce.
