= Chris Kraus (basketball) =

Canadian basketball coach

Current position
- Title: Head coach
- Team: Stonehill
- Conference: NEC
- Record: 176–184 (.489)

Biographical details
- Born: February 22, 1983 (age 43); Markham, Ontario, Canada

Playing career
- 2003–2006: Stonehill
- 2006–2007: London United

Coaching career (HC unless noted)
- 2006–2007: Acadia (assistant)
- 2007–2009: Brandon (assistant)
- 2010–2013: Stonehill (assistant)
- 2013–present: Stonehill

Head coaching record
- Overall: 176–184 (.489)
- Tournaments: 3–2 (NCAA Division II)

Accomplishments and honors

Awards
- NEC Coach of the Year (2023)

Chris Kraus (born February 22, 1983) is a Canadian basketball coach who is the current head coach of the Stonehill Skyhawks men's basketball team.

== Playing career ==
Kraus played for his father at Markham District High School before enrolling at Stonehill, where he was part of the Skyhawks' 2006 NCAA Division II Final Four team. After graduation, Kraus would play professional basketball in England for London United.

== Coaching career ==
Beginning his coaching career in Canada, Kraus joined the coaching staff at Acadia University in Nova Scotia for one season as an assistant to Les Berry. The team won the AUS Championship and advanced to the CIS Final 8, losing to Carlton University head coach and future NCAA head coach Dave Smart. Kraus then moved on to Brandon University in Manitoba for two seasons as an assistant. He'd return to his alma mater and join the coaching staff of his former coach David McLaughlin in 2010. In 2013, when McLaughlin joined the coaching staff at Northeastern, Kraus was elevated to head coach of the Skyhawks.

In nine seasons at the helm at the Division II level, Kraus guided Stonehill to three NCAA tournament bids, including an Elite Eight appearance in 2016. Kraus will guide the Skyhawks into NCAA Division I as the school becomes a member of the Northeast Conference for the 2022–23 season.

== Head coaching record ==
Record table
Season	Team	Overall	Conference	Standing	Postseason
Stonehill Skyhawks (Northeast 10 Conference) (2013–2022)
2013–14	Stonehill	8–18	5–16	7th (Northeast)	
2014–15	Stonehill	19–10	14–7	2nd (Northeast)	NCAA Division II First Round
2015–16	Stonehill	24–9	15–6	3rd (Northeast)	NCAA Division II Elite Eight
2016–17	Stonehill	15–12	10–11	6th (Northeast)	
2017–18	Stonehill	17–12	12–9	3rd (Northeast)	
2018–19	Stonehill	14–15	8–13	5th (Northeast)	
2019–20	Stonehill	18–11	13–6	2nd (Northeast)	
2020–21*	Stonehill	0–0	0–0		
2021–22	Stonehill	15–12	10–9	4th (Northeast)	
Stonehill Skyhawks (Northeast Conference) (2022–present)
2022–23	Stonehill	14–17	10–6	T–2nd	
2023–24	Stonehill	4–27	2–14	9th	
2024–25	Stonehill	15–17	7–9	6th	
2025–26	Stonehill	12–21	8–10	T–6th	
2026–27	Stonehill	1–3	0–0		
Stonehill:		176–184 (.489)	106–106 (.500)		
Total:		176–184 (.489)			
National champion Postseason invitational champion Conference regular season champion Conference regular season and conference tournament champion Division regular season champion Division regular season and conference tournament champion Conference tournament champion

^{*Season canceled due to the COVID-19 pandemic.}
