= Jordan Minor =

American basketball player (born 2000)

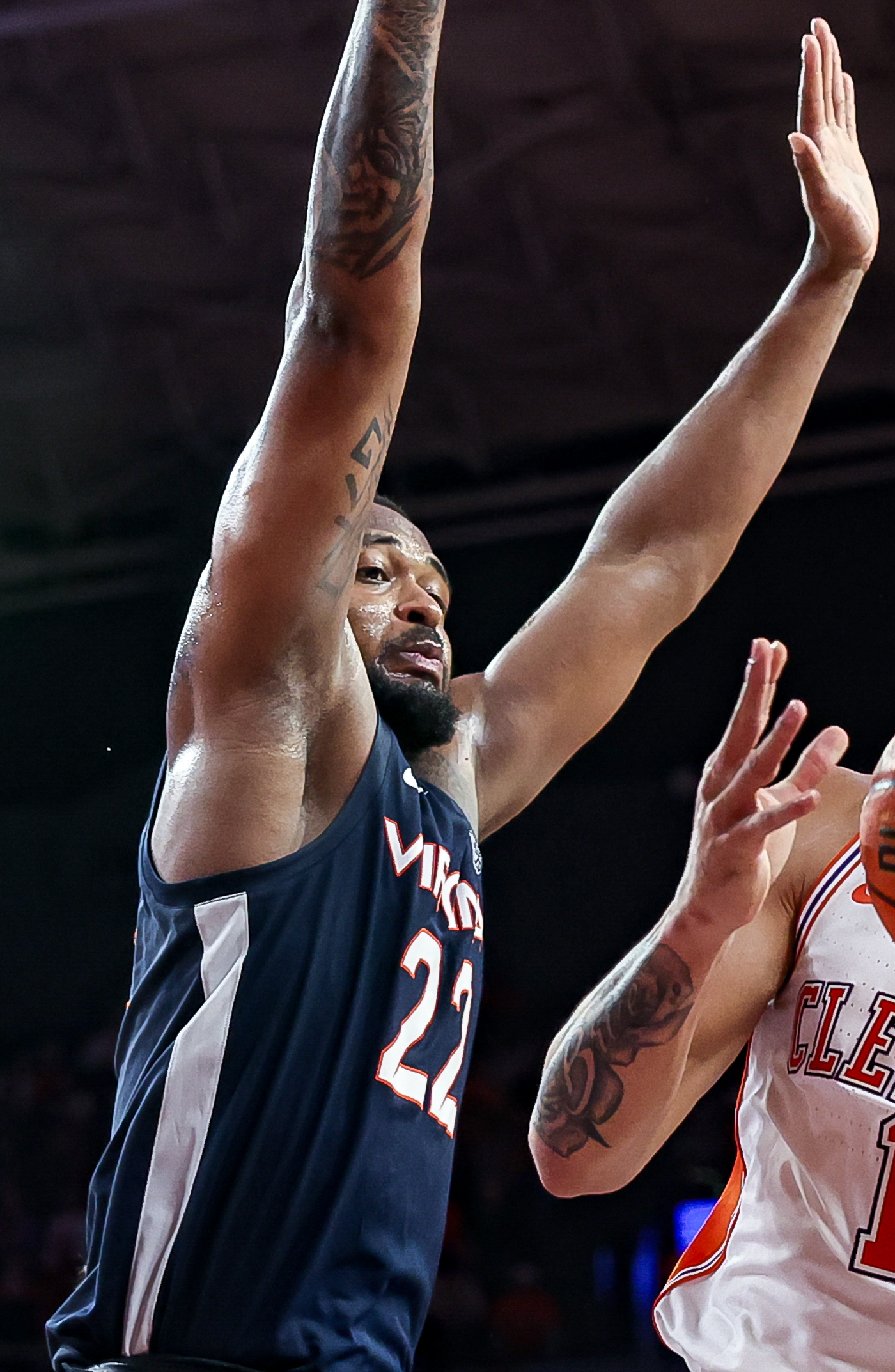
- Minor with Virginia in 2024

No. 9 – Osceola Magic
- Position: Power forward
- League: NBA G League

Personal information
- Born: March 11, 2000 (age 26) Kingston, Massachusetts, U.S.
- Listed height: 6 ft 8 in (2.03 m)
- Listed weight: 240 lb (109 kg)

Career information
- High school: Boston College HS (Boston, Massachusetts); Brimmer and May School (Chestnut Hill, Massachusetts)
- College: Merrimack (2019–2023); Virginia (2023–2024)
- NBA draft: 2024: undrafted
- Playing career: 2024–present

Career history
- 2024–2025: Long Island Nets
- 2025: Élan Béarnais
- 2025–2026: Memphis Hustle
- 2026: Birmingham Squadron
- 2026: Mexico City Capitanes
- 2026: Brampton Honey Badgers
- 2026–present: Osceola Magic

Career highlights
- NEC co-Player of the Year (2023); NEC Defensive Player of the Year (2023); First-team All-NEC (2023); NEC Champion (2023); Second-team All-NEC (2022)

Jordan Minor (born March 11, 2000) is an American professional basketball player for the Osceola Magic of the NBA G League. He played college basketball for the Merrimack Warriors and the Virginia Cavaliers.

== High school career ==
Minor attended Boston College High School for three seasons before transferring to Brimmer and May School. In April 2019, he committed to play college basketball at Merrimack, choosing the Warriors over UMass and Brown.

== College career ==
As a freshman, Minor averaged 6.2 points per game. He averaged 12 points, 8.1 rebounds, and 1.3 blocks per game as a sophomore and was named to the Third Team All-Northeast Conference. As a junior, Minor averaged 15.1 points and 8.2 rebounds per game, earning Second Team All-NEC honors. He missed six games during his senior season due to an undisclosed injury. Minor was named NEC co-Player of the Year as a senior, alongside Josh Cohen of Saint Francis University. Minor averaged 17.4 points, 9.4 rebounds, 2.6 blocks and 2.3 assists per game. On April 13, 2023, he announced he was transferring to the University of Virginia. Minor averaged 4.3 points and 3.1 rebounds per game in his final season.

== Professional career ==
=== Long Island Nets (2024–2025) ===
After going undrafted in the 2024 NBA draft, Minor signed with the Long Island Nets.

=== Élan Béarnais (2025) ===
On April 25, 2025, Minor signed with Élan Béarnais of the French LNB Élite.

=== Memphis Hustle (2025–2026) ===
On September 9, 2025, Minor was re-acquired by the Long Island Nets and then traded to the Memphis Hustle alongside a 2026 first-round pick in exchange for Malachi Smith. On January 16, 2026, Minor was waived by the Hustle.

=== Birmingham Squadron (2026) ===
On January 17, 2026, Minor joined the Birmingham Squadron. However just three days later on January 20, 2026, Minor left the Squadron.

=== Mexico City Capitanes (2026) ===
On January 24, 2026, Minor signed with the Mexico City Capitanes for the remainder of the 2025-26 NBA G League season.

=== Brampton Honey Badgers (2026) ===
On July 23, 2026, Minor signed with the Brampton Honey Badgers of the Canadian Elite Basketball League (CEBL).

=== Osceola Magic (2026–present) ===
On October 19, 2026, Minor was re-acquired by the Mexico City Capitanes and then traded to the Osceola Magic alongside a 2026 second-round pick in exchange for the returning player rights to Jalen McDaniels and Justin Minaya.
