= 2022–23 Colgate Raiders men's basketball team =

American college basketball season

2022–23 Colgate Raiders men's basketball

Patriot League regular-season and tournament champions

NCAA tournament, first round
- Conference: Patriot League
- Record: 26–9 (17–1 Patriot)
- Head coach: Matt Langel (12th season)
- Assistant coaches: Camryn Crocker; Trey Montgomery; Pat Moore
- Home arena: Cotterell Court

2022–23 Patriot League men's basketball standings
	Conf.				Overall
Team	W		L	PCT	W		L	PCT
Colgate†	17	–	1	.944	26	–	9	.743
Navy	11	–	7	.611	18	–	13	.581
Lehigh	11	–	7	.611	16	–	14	.533
Army	10	–	8	.556	17	–	16	.515
Boston University	8	–	10	.444	15	–	17	.469
Lafayette	7	–	11	.389	11	–	23	.324
American	7	–	11	.389	17	–	15	.531
Loyola	7	–	11	.389	13	–	20	.394
Holy Cross	7	–	11	.389	10	–	22	.313
Bucknell	5	–	13	.278	12	–	20	.375
† 2023 Patriot League tournament winner

The 2022–23 Colgate Raiders men's basketball team represented Colgate University in the 2022–23 NCAA Division I men's basketball season. The Raiders, led by 12th-year head coach Matt Langel, played their home games at Cotterell Court in Hamilton, New York as members of the Patriot League. They finished the season 23–8, 17–1 in Patriot League play, to finish as regular-season champions for the third consecutive year. As the No. 1 seed, they defeated Loyola (MD), Army and Lafayette to win the Patriot League tournament. They received the conference’s automatic bid to the NCAA tournament for the third consecutive year. As the No. 15 seed in the Midwest Region, they lost in the first round of the NCAA tournament to Texas, finishing their season with an overall record of 26–9.

== Previous season ==
The Raiders finished the 2021–22 season 23–12, 16–2 in Patriot League play, to finish atop the North Division. In the Patriot League tournament, they defeated Bucknell in the quarterfinals and Lehigh in the semifinals, advancing to the championship game for the fifth consecutive year. There, they defeated Navy, earning the Patriot League's automatic berth into the NCAA tournament. They drew the #14 seed in the Midwest Region, where they lost to No. 3 seed Wisconsin in the first round.

== Roster ==
2022–23 Colgate Raiders men's basketball team
Players
Coaches

Pos.	#	Name	Height	Weight	Year	Previous school	Hometown
G	1	Brady Cummins	6 ft 6 in (1.98 m)	190 lb (86 kg)	Fr	Brooks School	York, ME
G	2	Braeden Smith	6 ft 0 in (1.83 m)	180 lb (82 kg)	Fr	Seattle Prep	Seattle, WA
G	3	Pearson Parker	6 ft 1 in (1.85 m)	185 lb (84 kg)	Sr	Phillips Exeter Academy	Los Angeles, CA
F	4	Ryan Moffatt	6 ft 7 in (2.01 m)	220 lb (100 kg)	Sr	Hempfield High School	Lancaster, PA
G	5	Nicolas Louis-Jacques	6 ft 4 in (1.93 m)	195 lb (88 kg)	So	Putnam Science Academy	Miami, FL
G	10	Chandler Baker	6 ft 5 in (1.96 m)	185 lb (84 kg)	Jr	Belmont Abbey	Woodstock, GA
F	14	Keegan Records	6 ft 10 in (2.08 m)	250 lb (113 kg)	Sr	St. Andrew's School	South Kingstown, RI
G	15	Tucker Richardson	6 ft 5 in (1.96 m)	215 lb (98 kg)	Sr	Blair Academy	Flemington, NJ
F	22	Malcolm Bailey	6 ft 10 in (2.08 m)	220 lb (100 kg)	Sr	Ridley College	Stratford, ON
F	30	Sam Thomson	6 ft 9 in (2.06 m)	230 lb (104 kg)	Jr	Brooks School	Kitchener–Waterloo, ON
G	33	Oliver Lynch-Daniels	6 ft 2 in (1.88 m)	190 lb (86 kg)	Sr	Houston Baptist	Chapel Hill, NC
G	34	Alex Capitano	6 ft 4 in (1.93 m)	205 lb (93 kg)	Jr	Episcopal Academy	Malvern, PA
F	55	Jeff Woodward	6 ft 11 in (2.11 m)	270 lb (122 kg)	Jr	Methacton High School	Audubon, PA

Head coach

- Matt Langel (Penn)

Assistant coach(es)

- Camryn Crocker (Penn)
- Trey Montgomery (Samford)
- Pat Moore (Colgate)

Legend

- (C) Team captain
- (S) Suspended
- (I) Ineligible
- (W) Walk-on
- Injured
- Current redshirt

Roster
Last update: December 31, 2022

== Schedule and results ==
Date time, TV	Rank^{#}	Opponent^{#}	Result	Record	Site (attendance) city, state
Non-conference regular season
November 7, 2022*; 7:00 p.m., ESPN+		at Buffalo	L 87–88	0–1	Alumni Arena (1,841); Amherst, NY
November 10, 2022*; 7:00 p.m., ESPN+		at Brown	W 77–68	1–1	Pizzitola Sports Center (716); Providence, RI
November 13, 2022*; 2:00 p.m., ESPN+		Wells	W 93–60	2–1	Cotterell Court (947); Hamilton, NY
November 15, 2022*; 7:00 p.m., ACCRSN		at Syracuse	W 80–68	3–1	JMA Wireless Dome (17,836); Syracuse, NY
November 18, 2022*; 6:00 p.m.		vs. Duquesne	L 80–85	3–2	LeBron James Arena (429); Akron, OH
November 21, 2022*; 7:00 p.m., ESPN+		Monmouth	W 85–66	4–2	Cotterell Court (684); Hamilton, NY
November 25, 2022*; 2:00 p.m., ESPN+		vs. Delaware; Cathedral Classic	L 68–72	4–3	The Palestra; Philadelphia, PA
November 26, 2022*; 4:30 p.m., ESPN+		at Penn; Cathedral Classic	L 69–81	4–4	The Palestra (1,782); Philadelphia, PA
November 27, 2022*; 2:00 p.m., ESPN+		vs. Hartford; Cathedral Classic	W 92–58	5–4	The Palestra; Philadelphia, PA
December 2, 2022*; 8:00 p.m., SECN+/ESPN+		at No. 15 Auburn	L 66–93	5–5	Neville Arena (9,121); Auburn, AL
December 7, 2022*; 7:30 p.m., ESPN+		at Binghamton	W 81–62	6–5	Binghamton University Events Center (1,558); Vestal, NY
December 10, 2022*; 12:00 p.m., ESPN+		Vermont	L 72–73	6–6	Cotterell Court (975); Hamilton, NY
December 22, 2022*; 2:00 p.m., ESPN+		Cornell	L 80–91	6–7	Cotterell Court (733); Hamilton, NY
Patriot League regular season
December 30, 2022; 7:00 p.m., ESPN+		at Loyola (MD)	W 101–67	7–7 (1–0)	Reitz Arena (706); Baltimore, MD
January 2, 2023; 2:00 p.m., ESPN+		at Lehigh	W 76–60	8–7 (2–0)	Stabler Arena (832); Bethlehem, PA
January 5, 2023; 7:00 p.m., ESPN+		Navy	W 87–73	9–7 (3–0)	Cotterell Court (604); Hamilton, NY
January 9, 2023; 7:00 p.m., CBSSN		at Army	W 77–75	10–7 (4–0)	Christl Arena (573); West Point, NY
January 11, 2023; 7:00 p.m., ESPN+		Boston University	W 77–71	11–7 (5–0)	Cotterell Court (761); Hamilton, NY
January 14, 2023; 2:00 p.m., ESPN+		Bucknell	W 71–65	12–7 (6–0)	Cotterell Court (785); Hamilton, NY
January 18, 2023; 7:00 p.m., ESPN+		at Holy Cross	W 77–71	13–7 (7–0)	Hart Center (1,107); Worcester, MA
January 21, 2023; 2:00 p.m., ESPN+		American	W 62–61	14–7 (8–0)	Cotterell Court (783); Hamilton, NY
January 23, 2023; 7:00 p.m., CBSSN		at Boston University	W 64–51	15–7 (9–0)	Case Gym (1,545); Boston, MA
January 28, 2023; 2:00 p.m., ESPN+		Lafayette	W 69–57	16–7 (10–0)	Cotterell Court (1,012); Hamilton, NY
January 30, 2023; 7:00 p.m., ESPN+		Loyola (MD)	W 76–63	17–7 (11–0)	Cotterell Court (867); Hamilton, NY
February 4, 2023; 4:00 p.m., ESPN+		at American	L 60–61	17–8 (11–1)	Bender Arena (1,414); Washington, D.C.
February 8, 2023; 7:00 p.m., ESPN+		Lehigh	W 81–53	18–8 (12–1)	Cotterell Court (769); Hamilton, NY
February 11, 2023; 12:00 p.m., ESPN+		at Bucknell	W 76–56	19–8 (13–1)	Sojka Pavilion (1,829); Lewisburg, PA
February 15, 2023; 7:00 p.m., ESPN+		Army	W 93–86	20–8 (14–1)	Cotterell Court (775); Hamilton, NY
February 18, 2023; 2:00 p.m., ESPN+		Holy Cross	W 96–73	21–8 (15–1)	Cotterell Court (1,096); Hamilton, NY
February 22, 2023; 7:00 p.m., ESPN+		at Lafayette	W 73–69	22–8 (16–1)	Kirby Sports Center (1,647); Easton, PA
February 25, 2023; 4:00 p.m., ESPN+		at Navy	W 64–60	23–8 (17–1)	Alumni Hall (2,505); Annapolis, MD
Patriot League tournament
March 2, 2023; 7:00 p.m., ESPN+	(1)	(8) Loyola (MD); Quarterfinals	W 92–73	24–8	Cotterell Court (1,279); Hamilton, NY
March 5, 2023; 2:00 p.m., CBSSN	(1)	(4) Army; Semifinals	W 91–74	25–8	Cotterell Court (1,327); Hamilton, NY
March 8, 2023; 7:30 p.m., CBSSN	(1)	(6) Lafayette; Championship	W 79–61	26–8	Cotterell Court (1,891); Hamilton, NY
NCAA tournament
March 16, 2023*; 7:25 p.m., TBS	(15 MW)	vs. (2 MW) No. 5 Texas; First round	L 61–81	26–9	Wells Fargo Arena (16,728); Des Moines, IA
*Non-conference game. ^{#}Rankings from AP poll. (#) Tournament seedings in parentheses. All times are in Eastern.
