= 2022–23 Navy Midshipmen men's basketball team =

American college basketball season

2022–23 Navy Midshipmen men's basketball
- Conference: Patriot League
- Record: 18–13 (11–7 Patriot)
- Head coach: Ed DeChellis (12th season)
- Associate head coach: Emmett Davis; Jon Perry
- Assistant coaches: Drew Gibson; Adam Notteboom
- Home arena: Alumni Hall

2022–23 Patriot League men's basketball standings
| | Conf. | | | | Overall |
| Team | W | | L | PCT | W | | L | PCT |
|---|---|---|---|---|---|---|---|---|
| Colgate† | 17 | – | 1 | .944 | 26 | – | 9 | .743 |
| Navy | 11 | – | 7 | .611 | 18 | – | 13 | .581 |
| Lehigh | 11 | – | 7 | .611 | 16 | – | 14 | .533 |
| Army | 10 | – | 8 | .556 | 17 | – | 16 | .515 |
| Boston University | 8 | – | 10 | .444 | 15 | – | 17 | .469 |
| Lafayette | 7 | – | 11 | .389 | 11 | – | 23 | .324 |
| American | 7 | – | 11 | .389 | 17 | – | 15 | .531 |
| Loyola | 7 | – | 11 | .389 | 13 | – | 20 | .394 |
| Holy Cross | 7 | – | 11 | .389 | 10 | – | 22 | .313 |
| Bucknell | 5 | – | 13 | .278 | 12 | – | 20 | .375 |
† 2023 Patriot League tournament winner

The 2022–23 Navy Midshipmen men's basketball team represented the United States Naval Academy in the 2022–23 NCAA Division I men's basketball season. The Midshipmen, led by 12th-year head coach Ed DeChellis, played their home games at Alumni Hall in Annapolis, Maryland as members of the Patriot League.

The Midshipmen finished the season 18–12, 11–7 in Patriot League play, to tie for second place. As the No. 2 seed in the Patriot League tournament, they were upset in the quarterfinal round by No. 7 seed American.

== Previous season ==
The Midshipmen finished the 2021–22 season 21–11, 12–6 in Patriot League play, to finish in second place. In the Patriot League tournament, they defeated American and Boston University, before falling to Colgate in the championship game.

== Roster ==
2022–23 Navy Midshipmen men's basketball team
Players
Coaches

| Pos. | # | Name | Height | Weight | Year | Previous school | Hometown |
|---|---|---|---|---|---|---|---|
| G | 0 | Austin Inge | 6 ft 0 in (1.83 m) | 187 lb (85 kg) | Jr | Greensboro Day School | Greensboro, NC |
| G | 1 | Austin Benigni | 5 ft 11 in (1.8 m) | 172 lb (78 kg) | Fr | The Woodlands Christian Academy | The Woodlands, TX |
| G | 2 | Lysander Rehnstrom | 6 ft 4 in (1.93 m) | 198 lb (90 kg) | So | Herndon High School | Reston, VA |
| G | 3 | Sean Yoder | 6 ft 3 in (1.91 m) | 201 lb (91 kg) | Sr | Pennridge High School | Dublin, PA |
| F | 5 | Tyler Nelson | 6 ft 6 in (1.98 m) | 220 lb (100 kg) | Sr | Metrolina Christian Academy | Monroe, NC |
| G | 10 | Christian Jones | 6 ft 1 in (1.85 m) | 196 lb (89 kg) | Sr | Annapolis High School | Bowie, MD |
| G | 12 | Grant Hopkins | 6 ft 1 in (1.85 m) | 175 lb (79 kg) | Fr | Thompson High School | Alabaster, AL |
| G | 14 | Kam Summers | 6 ft 4 in (1.93 m) | 182 lb (83 kg) | So | First Academy | Ocoee, FL |
| G | 15 | P.J. Jr. Roach | 6 ft 1 in (1.85 m) | 176 lb (80 kg) | Sr | Atlantic Shores Christian School | Virginia Beach, VA |
| G | 20 | Cam Cormany | 6 ft 0 in (1.83 m) | 182 lb (83 kg) | Fr | Radford High School | Radford, VA |
| G | 21 | Patrick Dorsey | 6 ft 5 in (1.96 m) | 204 lb (93 kg) | Sr | Millbrook High School | Raleigh, NC |
| G | 22 | Mac MacDonald | 6 ft 1 in (1.85 m) | 183 lb (83 kg) | So | Collegiate School | Richmond, VA |
| F | 23 | B.J. Knight | 6 ft 5 in (1.96 m) | 235 lb (107 kg) | Jr | Peachtree Ridge High School | Suwanee, GA |
| F | 24 | P.J. Fenton | 6 ft 7 in (2.01 m) | 213 lb (97 kg) | Sr | Green Hope High School | Cary, NC |
| G | 25 | Amir Whitlock | 6 ft 3 in (1.91 m) | 199 lb (90 kg) | So | DeLaSalle High School | Plymouth, MN |
| F | 30 | Mike Woods | 6 ft 4 in (1.93 m) | 194 lb (88 kg) | Fr | Douglass High School | Upper Marlboro, MD |
| F | 31 | Daniel Deaver | 6 ft 8 in (2.03 m) | 221 lb (100 kg) | Sr | Marshall High School | Falls Church, VA |
| G | 32 | Charles West | 6 ft 3 in (1.91 m) | 206 lb (93 kg) | Jr | Spanish River High School | Delray Beach, FL |
| C | 33 | Myles Evans | 6 ft 7 in (2.01 m) | 235 lb (107 kg) | So | Ravenscroft School | Wake Forest, NC |
| F | 34 | Mitch Fischer | 6 ft 9 in (2.06 m) | 215 lb (98 kg) | So | Loyola Blakefield | Glen Arm, MD |
| F | 35 | Nate Allison | 6 ft 7 in (2.01 m) | 225 lb (102 kg) | Sr | Starr's Mill High School | Fayetteville, GA |
| G | 40 | Sam Krist | 6 ft 4 in (1.93 m) | 186 lb (84 kg) | Fr | Rockford High School | Rockford, MI |
| F | 41 | Tony Atkinson | 6 ft 8 in (2.03 m) | 232 lb (105 kg) | Jr | Westminster Academy | Palm Beach Gardens, FL |
| G | 43 | Jalen White | 6 ft 3 in (1.91 m) | 195 lb (88 kg) | Fr | Mount Saint Joseph High School | Severn, MD |
| C | 45 | Jaime Hernandez | 6 ft 10 in (2.08 m) | 225 lb (102 kg) | So | Page High School | Franklin, TN |
| C | 55 | Aidan Kehoe | 6 ft 10 in (2.08 m) | 231 lb (105 kg) | Fr | Pascack Hills High School | Montvale, NJ |

Head coach

- Ed DeChellis (Penn State)

Assistant coach(es)

- Emmett Davis (St. Lawrence)
- Jon Perry (ETSU)
- Drew Gibson (Wofford)
- Adam Notteboom (Xavier)

Legend

- (C) Team captain
- (S) Suspended
- (I) Ineligible
- (W) Walk-on
- Injured
- Current redshirt

Roster
Last update: December 27, 2022

== Schedule and results ==
| Date time, TV | Rank^{#} | Opponent^{#} | Result | Record | Site (attendance) city, state |
Non-conference regular season
| November 7, 2022*; 7:30 p.m., FloHoops | | at William & Mary | W 74–59 | 1–0 | Kaplan Arena (3,772); Williamsburg, VA |
| November 11, 2022*; 8:30 p.m., CBSSN | | Princeton; Veterans Classic | W 74–73 | 2–0 | Alumni Hall (2,889); Annapolis, MD |
| November 14, 2022*; 7:00 p.m., Watch Coppin | | at Coppin State | L 68–75 | 2–1 | Physical Education Complex (1,118); Baltimore, MD |
| November 18, 2022*; 7:00 p.m., ESPN+ | | UC San Diego | W 78–69 ^{OT} | 3–1 | Alumni Hall (688); Annapolis, MD |
| November 20, 2022*; 2:00 p.m., ESPN+ | | Youngstown State | W 80–67 | 4–1 | Alumni Hall (664); Annapolis, MD |
| November 26, 2022*; 11:00 a.m., ESPN+ | | Mount St. Mary's | W 75–59 | 5–1 | Alumni Hall (793); Annapolis, MD |
| November 30, 2022*; 12:00 p.m., ESPN+ | | at Lipscomb | L 77–82 | 5–2 | Allen Arena (1,675); Nashville, TN |
| December 3, 2022*; 1:00 p.m., ESPN+ | | at VMI | L 72–80 | 5–3 | Cameron Hall (1,250); Lexington, VA |
| December 7, 2022*; 7:00 p.m., ESPNU | | at West Virginia | L 64–85 | 5–4 | WVU Coliseum (10,277); Morgantown, WV |
| December 11, 2022*; 4:00 p.m., NBCSW | | at Towson | W 71–69 ^{OT} | 6–4 | SECU Arena (2,075); Towson, MD |
| December 18, 2022*; 12:00 p.m., ESPN+ | | Washington College | W 93–54 | 7–4 | Alumni Hall (755); Annapolis, MD |
| December 21, 2022*; 7:00 p.m., ESPN+ | | at VCU | L 52–74 | 7–5 | Siegel Center (7,214); Richmond, VA |
Patriot League regular season
| December 30, 2022; 2:00 p.m., ESPN+ | | at Boston University | W 75–58 | 8–5 (1–0) | Case Gym (802); Boston, MA |
| January 2, 2023; 1:00 p.m., ESPN+ | | Holy Cross | L 63–74 | 8–6 (1–1) | Alumni Hall (686); Annapolis, MD |
| January 5, 2023; 7:00 p.m., ESPN+ | | at Colgate | L 73–87 | 8–7 (1–2) | Cotterell Court (604); Hamilton, NY |
| January 8, 2023; 2:00 p.m., ESPN+ | | Lehigh | L 73–78 | 8–8 (1–3) | Alumni Hall (848); Annapolis, MD |
| January 11, 2023; 7:00 p.m., ESPN+ | | Lafayette | L 50–59 | 8–9 (1–4) | Alumni Hall (946); Annapolis, MD |
| January 14, 2023; 5:00 p.m., ESPN+ | | at Loyola (MD) | L 67–69 | 8–10 (1–5) | Reitz Arena (824); Baltimore, MD |
| January 18, 2023; 7:00 p.m., ESPN+ | | Boston University | W 63–45 | 9–10 (2–5) | Alumni Hall (948); Annapolis, MD |
| January 21, 2023; 1:30 p.m., CBSSN | | at Army | W 77–71 | 10–10 (3–5) | Christl Arena (5,025); West Point, NY |
| January 25, 2023; 7:00 p.m., ESPN+ | | at Bucknell | W 63–46 | 11–10 (4–5) | Sojka Pavilion (828); Lewisburg, PA |
| January 28, 2023; 2:00 p.m., ESPN+ | | American | L 69–73 | 11–11 (4–6) | Alumni Hall (2,100); Annapolis, MD |
| February 1, 2023; 7:00 p.m., ESPN+ | | at Lafayette | W 53–34 | 12–11 (5–6) | Kirby Sports Center (1,578); Easton, PA |
| February 4, 2023; 2:00 p.m., ESPN+ | | at Holy Cross | W 86–68 | 13–11 (6–6) | Hart Center (1,753); Worcester, MA |
| February 8, 2023; 7:00 p.m., ESPN+ | | Bucknell | W 71–65 | 14–11 (7–6) | Alumni Hall (1,207); Annapolis, MD |
| February 11, 2023; 1:30 p.m., CBSSN | | Army | W 70–53 | 15–11 (8–6) | Alumni Hall (5,274); Annapolis, MD |
| February 15, 2023; 7:00 p.m., ESPN+ | | at Lehigh | W 75–64 | 16–11 (9–6) | Stabler Arena (1,376); Bethlehem, PA |
| February 18, 2023; 4:00 p.m., ESPN+ | | Loyola (MD) | W 65–53 | 17–11 (10–6) | Alumni Hall (2,323); Annapolis, MD |
| February 22, 2023; 7:00 p.m., ESPN+ | | at American | W 70–54 | 18–11 (11–6) | Bender Arena (727); Washington, D.C. |
| February 25, 2023; 4:00 p.m. | | Colgate | L 60–64 | 18–12 (11–7) | Alumni Hall (2,505); Annapolis, MD |
Patriot League tournament
| March 2, 2023; 7:00 p.m., ESPN+ | (2) | (7) American; Quarterfinals | L 51–52 | 18–13 | Alumni Hall (986); Annapolis, MD |
*Non-conference game. ^{#}Rankings from AP poll. (#) Tournament seedings in parentheses. All times are in Eastern.
