= 2022–23 Lafayette Leopards men's basketball team =

Men's college basketball season

2022–23 Lafayette Leopards men's basketball
- Conference: Patriot League
- Record: 11–23 (7–11 Patriot)
- Head coach: Mike Jordan (put on leave February 21) (1st season); Mike McGarvey (acting head coach)
- Associate head coach: Mike McGarvey
- Assistant coaches: Sean O'Brien; Cameron Ayers
- Home arena: Kirby Sports Center

2022–23 Patriot League men's basketball standings
	Conf.				Overall
Team	W		L	PCT	W		L	PCT
Colgate†	17	–	1	.944	26	–	9	.743
Navy	11	–	7	.611	18	–	13	.581
Lehigh	11	–	7	.611	16	–	14	.533
Army	10	–	8	.556	17	–	16	.515
Boston University	8	–	10	.444	15	–	17	.469
Lafayette	7	–	11	.389	11	–	23	.324
American	7	–	11	.389	17	–	15	.531
Loyola	7	–	11	.389	13	–	20	.394
Holy Cross	7	–	11	.389	10	–	22	.313
Bucknell	5	–	13	.278	12	–	20	.375
† 2023 Patriot League tournament winner

Lafayette leopards word mark

The 2022–23 Lafayette Leopards men's basketball team represented Lafayette College in the 2022–23 NCAA Division I men's basketball season. The Leopards, led by first-year head coach Mike Jordan, played their home games at the Kirby Sports Center in Easton, Pennsylvania as members of the Patriot League. They finished the season 11–23, 7–11 in Patriot League play, to finish in a four-way tie for sixth place. As the No. 6 seed in the Patriot League tournament, they defeated Lehigh and American to advance to the tournament championship for the first time since 2015. There they lost to Colgate.

On February 21, 2023 (two games before the end of the season), head coach Mike Jordan was placed on administrative leave following a complaint. Mike McGarvey was appointed as acting head coach. On March 29, the school announced that McGarvey would take over as the team's new coach.

== Previous season ==
The Leopards finished the 2021–22 season 10–20, 7–11 in Patriot League play, to finish in a tie for seventh place. In the Patriot League tournament, they were defeated in overtime by Bucknell in the first round. During the season, on January 21, longtime head coach Fran O'Hanlon announced that he would retire at the end of the season, ending his 27-year run as the head coach. On March 29, Colgate assistant Mike Jordan was named as O'Hanlon's successor.

== Roster ==
2022–23 Lafayette Leopards men's basketball team
Players
Coaches

Pos.	#	Name	Height	Weight	Year	Hometown
G	0	Ryan Pettit	6 ft 1 in (1.85 m)	195 lb (88 kg)	Fr	Westfield, NJ
G	1	Ryan Zambie	6 ft 3 in (1.91 m)	195 lb (88 kg)	Jr	Plano, TX
G	2	Jon Brantley	6 ft 3 in (1.91 m)	185 lb (84 kg)	Jr	Farmington Hills, MI
G	3	Devin Hines	6 ft 4 in (1.93 m)	170 lb (77 kg)	So	West Palm Beach, FL
G	4	CJ Fulton	6 ft 2 in (1.88 m)	185 lb (84 kg)	So	Belfast, Northern Ireland
G	5	Eric Sondberg	6 ft 7 in (2.01 m)	200 lb (91 kg)	Jr	Davidsonville, MD
G	10	Gavin Kreitz	5 ft 9 in (1.75 m)	170 lb (77 kg)	Fr	Basking Ridge, NJ
G	11	Isaiah Thompson	6 ft 0 in (1.83 m)	175 lb (79 kg)	So	White Plains, NY
F	14	Kyle Jenkins	6 ft 7 in (2.01 m)	220 lb (100 kg)	Jr	Higganum, CT
C	15	Justin Vander Baan	7 ft 0 in (2.13 m)	240 lb (109 kg)	So	Northbridge, MA
G	20	TJ Berger	6 ft 4 in (1.93 m)	185 lb (84 kg)	So	Malvern, PA
F	22	Chris Rubayo	6 ft 10 in (2.08 m)	210 lb (95 kg)	So	Skillman, NJ
G/F	24	Kyle Squires	6 ft 8 in (2.03 m)	185 lb (84 kg)	Fr	Kingston, MA
F	33	Leo O'Boyle	6 ft 7 in (2.01 m)	210 lb (95 kg)	Sr	Scranton, PA
F	55	Josh Rivera	6 ft 7 in (2.01 m)	200 lb (91 kg)	Fr	New Brunswick, NJ

Head coach

- Mike Jordan (Penn)

Assistant coach(es)

- Mike McGarvey (Ursinus)
- Sean O'Brien (Colgate)
- Cameron Ayers (Bucknell)

Legend

- (C) Team captain
- (S) Suspended
- (I) Ineligible
- (W) Walk-on
- Injured
- Current redshirt

Roster
Last update: December 30, 2022

== Schedule and results ==
Date time, TV	Rank^{#}	Opponent^{#}	Result	Record	Site (attendance) city, state
Non-conference regular season
November 7, 2022*; 7:30 p.m., ESPN+		at Miami (FL)	L 54–67	0–1	Watsco Center (4,789); Coral Gables, FL
November 12, 2022*; 6:00 p.m., FS2		at St. John's	L 68–83	0–2	Carnesecca Arena (3,611); Queens, NY
November 14, 2022*; 7:00 p.m., ESPN+		at Saint Joseph's	L 59–63	0–3	Hagan Arena (1,296); Philadelphia, PA
November 18, 2022*; 2:00 p.m., ESPN3		at UMBC	L 63–71	0–4	Chesapeake Employers Insurance Arena (974); Catonsville, MD
November 19, 2022*; 12:00 p.m., ESPN3		vs. Central Connecticut	W 55–50	1–4	Chesapeake Employers Insurance Arena (87); Catonsville, MD
November 22, 2022*; 8:30 p.m., ESPN+		Penn	L 68–74 ^{OT}	1–5	Kirby Sports Center (1,364); Easton, PA
November 25, 2022*; 7:00 p.m., BTN+		at Penn State	L 57–70	1–6	Bryce Jordan Center (5,652); University Park, PA
November 30, 2022*; 7:00 p.m., FloSports		at Drexel	L 56–64	1–7	Daskalakis Athletic Center (1,346); Philadelphia, PA
December 4, 2022*; 1:00 p.m., ESPN+		at Cornell	L 68–73	1–8	Newman Arena (448); Ithaca, NY
December 6, 2022*; 7:00 p.m., ESPN+		at Princeton	L 58–69	1–9	Jadwin Gymnasium (920); Princeton, NJ
December 10, 2022*; 1:00 p.m., ESPN3		at Quinnipiac	L 63–76	1–10	M&T Bank Arena (796); Hamden, CT
December 12, 2022*; 7:00 p.m., ESPN+		Columbia	L 45–57	1–11	Kirby Sports Center (1,267); Easton, PA
December 21, 2022*; 2:00 p.m., ESPN+		at La Salle	W 90–65	2–11	Tom Gola Arena (1,071); Philadelphia, PA
Patriot League regular season
December 30, 2022; 7:00 p.m., ESPN+		American	L 47–60	2–12 (0–1)	Kirby Sports Center (1,796); Easton, PA
January 2, 2023; 7:00 p.m., ESPN+		Army	L 65–82	2–13 (0–2)	Kirby Sports Center (1,574); Easton, PA
January 5, 2023; 7:00 p.m., ESPN+		at Boston University	L 69–73	2–14 (0–3)	Case Gym (435); Boston, MA
January 8, 2023; 1:00 p.m., ESPN+		Bucknell	W 74–67	3–14 (1–3)	Kirby Sports Center (1,696); Easton, PA
January 11, 2023; 7:00 p.m., ESPN+		at Navy	W 59–50	4–14 (2–3)	Alumni Hall (946); Annapolis, MD
January 14, 2023; 1:00 p.m., ESPN+		Holy Cross	W 62–48	5–14 (3–3)	Kirby Sports Center (1,776); Easton, PA
January 18, 2023; 7:00 p.m., ESPN+		at American	W 70–59	6–14 (4–3)	Bender Arena (1,207); Washington, D.C.
January 21, 2023; 7:00 p.m., ESPN+		at Lehigh	L 49–61	6–15 (4–4)	Stabler Arena (1,046); Bethlehem, PA
January 25, 2023; 7:00 p.m., ESPN+		Loyola (MD)	W 62–46	7–15 (5–4)	Kirby Sports Center (1,687); Easton, PA
January 28, 2023; 2:00 p.m., ESPN+		at Colgate	L 57–69	7–16 (5–5)	Cotterell Court (1,012); Hamilton, NY
February 1, 2023; 7:00 p.m., ESPN+		Navy	L 34–53	7–17 (5–6)	Kirby Sports Center (1,578); Easton, PA
February 4, 2023; 1:00 p.m., ESPN+		Lehigh	L 64–66	7–18 (5–7)	Kirby Sports Center (2,013); Easton, PA
February 6, 2023; 7:00 p.m., CBSSN/ESPN+		at Holy Cross	W 72–58	8–18 (6–7)	Hart Center (1,316); Worcester, MA
February 11, 2023; 1:00 p.m., ESPN+		Boston University	W 69–65 ^{OT}	9–18 (7–7)	Kirby Sports Center (1,680); Easton, PA
February 15, 2023; 7:00 p.m., ESPN+		at Loyola (MD)	L 70–73	9–19 (7–8)	Reitz Arena (624); Baltimore, MD
February 18, 2023; 1:00 p.m., ESPN+		at Army	L 43–53	9–20 (7–9)	Christl Arena (1,071); West Point, NY
February 22, 2023; 7:00 p.m., ESPN+		Colgate	L 69–73	9–21 (7–10)	Kirby Sports Center (1,647); Easton, PA
February 25, 2023; 2:00 p.m., ESPN+		at Bucknell	L 65–75	9–22 (7–11)	Sojka Pavilion (1,562); Lewisburg, PA
Patriot League tournament
March 2, 2023; 7:00 p.m., ESPN+	(6)	at (3) Lehigh; Quarterfinals	W 71–64	10–22	Stabler Arena (2,095); Bethlehem, PA
March 5, 2023; 4:00 p.m., CBSSN	(6)	(7) American; Semifinals	W 84–76 ^{2OT}	11–22	Kirby Sports Center (2,016); Easton, PA
March 8, 2023; 7:30 p.m., CBSSN	(6)	at (1) Colgate; Championship	L 61–79	11–23	Cotterell Court; Hamilton, NY
*Non-conference game. ^{#}Rankings from AP poll. (#) Tournament seedings in parentheses. All times are in Eastern.
