= 2022–23 Syracuse Orange men's basketball team =

Basketball season

2022–23 Syracuse Orange men's basketball
- Conference: Atlantic Coast Conference
- Record: 17–15 (10–10 ACC)
- Head coach: Jim Boeheim (47th season)
- Assistant coaches: Adrian Autry; Gerry McNamara; Allen Griffin
- Offensive scheme: Ball-Screen Motion
- Base defense: 2–3 Zone
- Home arena: JMA Wireless Dome

2022–23 ACC men's basketball standings
	Conf.				Overall
Team	W		L	PCT	W		L	PCT
No. 16 Miami (FL)	15	–	5	.750	29	–	8	.784
No. 14 Virginia	15	–	5	.750	25	–	8	.758
Clemson	14	–	6	.700	23	–	11	.676
No. 12 Duke †	14	–	6	.700	27	–	9	.750
Pittsburgh	14	–	6	.700	24	–	12	.667
NC State	12	–	8	.600	23	–	11	.676
North Carolina	11	–	9	.550	20	–	13	.606
Wake Forest	10	–	10	.500	19	–	14	.576
Syracuse	10	–	10	.500	17	–	15	.531
Boston College	9	–	11	.450	16	–	17	.485
Virginia Tech	8	–	12	.400	19	–	15	.559
Florida State	7	–	13	.350	9	–	23	.281
Georgia Tech	6	–	14	.300	15	–	18	.455
Notre Dame	3	–	17	.150	11	–	21	.344
Louisville	2	–	18	.100	4	–	28	.125
† 2023 ACC tournament winner Rankings from AP poll

The 2022–23 Syracuse Orange men's basketball team represented Syracuse University during the 2022–23 NCAA Division I men's basketball season. The Orange were led by 47th-year head coach Jim Boeheim and played their home games at JMA Wireless Dome in Syracuse, New York as tenth-year members of the Atlantic Coast Conference. The Orange finished the season 17–15, 10–10 in ACC play to finish in a tie for eighth place. As the eighth seed in the ACC tournament, the lost to Wake Forest in the second round. This was the second year in a row that Syracuse did not qualify for a post season tournament, a first in Boeheim's 47-year tenure.

This season marked the final season coached by long–time head coach Jim Boeheim, who was replaced following the season by former assistant coach Adrian Autry.

== Previous season ==
The Orange finished the 2021–22 season 16–17, 9–11 in ACC play to finish in ninth place. As the ninth seed in the ACC tournament, they defeated eighth seed Florida State in the Second Round before losing to first seed Duke in the Quarterfinals. They were not invited to the NCAA tournament or the NIT.

== Offseason ==
=== Departures ===
Departures
Name	Number	Pos.	Height	Weight	Year	Hometown	Reason for departure
Jimmy Boeheim	0	F	6'8"	225	GS Senior	Fayetteville, NY	Graduated
Paddy Casey	1	G	6'0"	200	GS Senior	Scranton, PA	Walk-on; graduated
Frank Anselem	5	C	6'10"	215	Sophomore	Lagos, Nigeria	Transferred to Georgia
Chaz Owens	12	F	6'5"	205	Sophomore	Blue Bell, PA	Transferred to Ranger College
Cole Swider	21	F	6'9"	220	Senior	Portsmouth, RI	Graduated/undrafted in 2022 NBA draft; signed with the Los Angeles Lakers
Chris Lavalle	24	G	5'11"	168	GS Senior	Syracuse, NY	Walk-on; graduated
Nick Giancola	32	F	6'5"	213	GS Senior	Lexington, KY	Walk-on; graduated
Bourama Sidibe	34	C	6'10"	220	GS Senior	Bamako, Mali	Graduated
Buddy Boeheim	35	G	6'6"	205	Senior	Fayetteville, NY	Graduated/undrafted in 2022 NBA draft; signed with the Detroit Pistons

=== Incoming transfers ===
Incoming transfer
Name	Number	Pos.	Height	Weight	Year	Hometown	Previous school
Mounir Hima	55	C	6'11"	240	RS Sophomore	Tillabéri, Niger	Duquesne

=== 2022 recruiting class ===
College recruiting information
Name	Hometown	School	Height	Weight	Commit date
Judah Mintz #6 SG	Washington, DC	Oak Hill Academy	6 ft 4 in (1.93 m)	175 lb (79 kg)	Mar 31, 2022
Judah Mintz #6 SG	Recruit ratings: Scout: Rivals: 247Sports: ESPN: (89)				
Justin Taylor #23 SF	Charlottesville, VA	IMG Academy	6 ft 6 in (1.98 m)	210 lb (95 kg)	Jun 26, 2021
Justin Taylor #23 SF	Recruit ratings: Scout: Rivals: 247Sports: ESPN: (82)				
Quadir Copeland #25 PG	Gettysburg, PA	Life Center Academy	6 ft 5 in (1.96 m)	175 lb (79 kg)	Aug 10, 2021
Quadir Copeland #25 PG	Recruit ratings: Scout: Rivals: 247Sports: ESPN: (82)				
Chris Bunch #21 SF	Mount Pleasant, UT	Wasatch Academy	6 ft 6 in (1.98 m)	185 lb (84 kg)	Oct 21, 2021
Chris Bunch #21 SF	Recruit ratings: Scout: Rivals: 247Sports: ESPN: (82)				
Maliq Brown #49 PF	Saint George, VA	Blue Ridge School	6 ft 8 in (2.03 m)	210 lb (95 kg)	Oct 16, 2021
Maliq Brown #49 PF	Recruit ratings: Scout: Rivals: 247Sports: ESPN: (79)				
Peter Carey #57 C	Northfield, MA	Northfield-Mt. Hermon School	6 ft 11 in (2.11 m)	190 lb (86 kg)	Sep 28, 2021
Peter Carey #57 C	Recruit ratings: Scout: Rivals: 247Sports: ESPN: (78)				
Overall recruit ranking:
Note: In many cases, Scout, Rivals, 247Sports, On3, and ESPN may conflict in their listings of height and weight.; In these cases, the average was taken. ESPN grades are on a 100-point scale.; Sources: "2022 Syracuse Signees". Rivals.; "2022 Syracuse Signees". Scout.; "2022 Syracuse Signees". ESPN.; "Scout.com Team Recruiting Rankings". Scout.; "2022 Team Ranking". Rivals.

== Roster ==
2022–23 Syracuse Orange men's basketball team
Players
Coaches

Pos.	#	Name	Height	Weight	Year	Previous school	Hometown
F	0	Chris Bell	6 ft 7 in (2.01 m)	180 lb (82 kg)	Fr	Wasatch Academy	Concord, California
F	1	Maliq Brown	6 ft 8 in (2.03 m)	213 lb (97 kg)	Fr	Blue Ridge School	Culpeper, Virginia
F	2	John Bol Ajak	6 ft 10 in (2.08 m)	216 lb (98 kg)	RS Jr	Westtown School	Natinga, South Sudan
G	3	Judah Mintz	6 ft 3 in (1.91 m)	172 lb (78 kg)	Fr	Oak Hill Academy	Fort Washington, Maryland
G	5	Justin Taylor	6 ft 6 in (1.98 m)	205 lb (93 kg)	Fr	IMG Academy	Charlottesville, Virginia
G	10	Symir Torrence	6 ft 3 in (1.91 m)	195 lb (88 kg)	Sr	Vermont Academy; Marquette	Syracuse, New York
G	11	Joseph Girard III	6 ft 1 in (1.85 m)	190 lb (86 kg)	Sr	Glens Falls	Glens Falls, New York
F	13	Benny Williams	6 ft 8 in (2.03 m)	208 lb (94 kg)	So	IMG Academy	Bowie, Maryland
C	14	Jesse Edwards	6 ft 11 in (2.11 m)	230 lb (104 kg)	Sr	IMG Academy	Amsterdam, Netherlands
C	23	Peter Carey	6 ft 11 in (2.11 m)	200 lb (91 kg)	Fr	Northfield Mount Hermon	Sunderland, Massachusetts
G	23	Niko Ruffin (W)	5 ft 10 in (1.78 m)	170 lb (77 kg)	So	Paramus Catholic	Cresskill, New Jersey
G	24	Quadir Copeland	6 ft 6 in (1.98 m)	203 lb (92 kg)	Fr	Life Center Academy	Philadelphia, Pennsylvania
G	25	Shane Feldman (W)	6 ft 2 in (1.88 m)	165 lb (75 kg)	RS Jr	Agoura	Agoura Hills, California
G	33	Arthur Cordes (W)	6 ft 3 in (1.91 m)	180 lb (82 kg)	Jr	Sheehan	Wallingford, Connecticut
C	55	Mounir Hima	6 ft 11 in (2.11 m)	230 lb (104 kg)	RS So	St. Benedict's Prep; Duquesne	Tillabéri, Niger

Head coach

- Jim Boeheim, 47th yr. (Syracuse, 1966)

Assistant coach(es)

- Adrian Autry, 12th yr. (Syracuse, 1994)
- Gerry McNamara, 14th yr. (Syracuse, 2007)
- Allen Griffin, 6th yr. (Syracuse, 2001)

Legend

- (C) Team captain
- (S) Suspended
- (I) Ineligible
- (W) Walk-on
- Injured
- Current redshirt

Roster

== Schedule and results ==
Date time, TV	Rank^{#}	Opponent^{#}	Result	Record	High points	High rebounds	High assists	Site (attendance) city, state
Exhibition
October 25, 2022*; 7:00 p.m.		IUP	W 86–68	–	17 – Girard III	12 – Williams	5 – Girard III	JMA Wireless Dome (3,123); Syracuse, NY
November 1, 2022*; 7:00 p.m.		Southern New Hampshire	W 72–58	–	15 – Girard III	8 – Williams	4 – Copeland	JMA Wireless Dome (3,123); Syracuse, NY
Regular Season
November 7, 2022*; 8:00 p.m., ACCNX/ESPN+		Lehigh	W 90–72	1–0	19 – Girard III	11 – Edwards	3 – Tied	JMA Wireless Dome (17,755); Syracuse, NY
November 15, 2022*; 7:00 p.m., ACCRSN		Colgate	L 68–80	1–1	20 – Mintz	8 – Williams	4 – Torrence	JMA Wireless Dome (17,836); Syracuse, NY
November 19, 2022*; 5:00 p.m., ACCN		Northeastern	W 76–48	2–1	21 – Girard III	8 – Williams	5 – Mintz	JMA Wireless Dome (15,668); Syracuse, NY
November 21, 2022*; 7:00 p.m., ESPN2		vs. Richmond; Empire Classic semifinals	W 74–71 ^{OT}	3–1	31 – Girard III	8 – Edwards	4 – Mintz	Barclays Center; Brooklyn, NY
November 22, 2022*; 9:30 p.m., ESPN2		vs. St. John's; Empire Classic championship	L 69–76 ^{OT}	3–2	20 – Mintz	10 – Williams	4 – Tied	Barclays Center (5,901); Brooklyn, NY
November 26, 2022*; 4:00 p.m., ACCNX/ESPN+		Bryant	L 72–73	3–3	25 – Taylor	21 – Edwards	4 – Ajak	JMA Wireless Dome (15,892); Syracuse, NY
November 29, 2022*; 7:30 p.m., ESPN		at No. 16 Illinois; ACC–Big Ten Challenge	L 44–73	3–4	9 – Tied	17 – Edwards	5 – Mintz	State Farm Center (15.544); Champaign, IL
December 3, 2022; 12:00 p.m., ESPN2		at Notre Dame	W 62–61	4–4 (1–0)	22 – Edwards	16 – Edwards	4 – Ajak	Joyce Center (5,702); South Bend, IN
December 6, 2022*; 6:00 p.m., ACCN		Oakland	W 95–66	5–4	18 – Tied	7 – Tied	6 – Tied	JMA Wireless Dome (17,368); Syracuse, NY
December 10, 2022*; 1:00 p.m., ABC		Georgetown; Rivalry	W 83–64	6–4	20 – Edwards	11 – Edwards	10 – Mintz	JMA Wireless Dome (20,370); Syracuse, NY
December 12, 2022*; 8:00 p.m., ACCN		Monmouth	W 86–71	7–4	24 – Mintz	10 – Edwards	5 – Mintz	JMA Wireless Dome (19,262); Syracuse, NY
December 17, 2022*; 3:00 p.m., ACCN		Cornell	W 78–63	8–4	19 – Girard III	12 – Edwards	4 – Tied	JMA Wireless Dome (16,578); Syracuse, NY
December 20, 2022; 9:00 p.m., ESPNU		Pittsburgh	L 82–84	8–5 (1–1)	24 – Mintz	9 – Tied	5 – Girard III	JMA Wireless Dome (15,417); Syracuse, NY
December 31, 2022; 2:00 p.m., ACCN		Boston College	W 79–65	9–5 (2–1)	24 – Girard III	11 – Williams	7 – Mintz	JMA Wireless Dome (17,693); Syracuse, NY
January 3, 2023; 7:00 p.m., ESPNews		at Louisville	W 70–69	10–5 (3–1)	28 – Girard III	11 – Edwards	4 – Mintz	KFC Yum! Center (11,506); Louisville, KY
January 7, 2023; 5:00 p.m., ACCN		at No. 11 Virginia	L 66–73	10–6 (3–2)	19 – Girard III	10 – Edwards	5 – Torrence	John Paul Jones Arena (14,217); Charlottesville, VA
January 11, 2023; 7:00 p.m., ACCRSN		Virginia Tech	W 82–72	11–6 (4–2)	24 – Girard III	12 – Brown	6 – Edwards	JMA Wireless Dome (16,158); Syracuse, NY
January 14, 2023; 7:00 p.m., ACCN		Notre Dame	W 78–73	12–6 (5–2)	17 – Bell	15 – Edwards	8 – Mintz	JMA Wireless Dome (20,666); Syracuse, NY
January 16, 2023; 7:00 p.m., ACCN		at No. 17 Miami (FL)	L 78–82	12–7 (5–3)	25 – Edwards	11 – Edwards	6 – Mintz	Watsco Center (6,765); Coral Gables, FL
January 21, 2023; 12:00 p.m., ACCRSN		at Georgia Tech	W 80–63	13–7 (6–3)	28 – Girard III	7 – Edwards	7 – Girard III	McCamish Pavilion (5,566); Atlanta, GA
January 24, 2023; 9:00 p.m., ESPN		North Carolina	L 68–72	13–8 (6–4)	18 – Girard III	7 – Tied	5 – Girard III	JMA Wireless Dome (20,761); Syracuse, NY
January 28, 2023; 7:00 p.m., ACCN		at Virginia Tech	L 70–85	13–9 (6–5)	21 – Mintz	6 – Brown	8 – Mintz	Cassell Coliseum (8,925); Blacksburg, VA
January 30, 2023; 7:00 p.m., ESPN		No. 6 Virginia	L 62–67	13–10 (6–6)	20 – Mintz	7 – Tied	3 – Tied	JMA Wireless Dome (19,272); Syracuse, NY
February 4, 2023; 5:00 p.m., ACCN		at Boston College	W 77–68	14–10 (7–6)	27 – Edwards	7 – Edwards	5 – Mintz	Conte Forum (7,000); Chestnut Hill, MA
February 8, 2023; 7:00 p.m., ESPNU		at Florida State	W 76–67	15–10 (8–6)	26 – Girard III	12 – Edwards	6 – Mintz	Donald L. Tucker Civic Center (5,656); Tallahassee, FL
February 14, 2023; 7:00 p.m., ACCN		No. 23 NC State	W 75–72	16–10 (9–6)	20 – Mintz	16 – Edwards	9 – Mintz	JMA Wireless Dome (18,957); Syracuse, NY
February 18, 2023; 6:00 p.m., ESPN		Duke	L 55–77	16–11 (9–7)	21 – Girard III	8 – Brown	2 – Tied	JMA Wireless Dome (31,063); Syracuse, NY
February 22, 2023; 7:00 p.m., ACCN		at Clemson	L 73–91	16–12 (9–8)	23 – Mintz	10 – Edwards	4 – Torrence	Littlejohn Coliseum (7,149); Clemson, SC
February 25, 2023; 5:00 p.m., ACCN		at Pittsburgh	L 82–99	16–13 (9–9)	24 – Williams	9 – Williams	6 – Mintz	Peterson Events Center (12,508); Pittsburgh, PA
February 28, 2023; 7:00 p.m., ACCRSN		Georgia Tech	L 76–96	16–14 (9–10)	23 – Mintz	8 – Edwards	7 – Mintz	JMA Wireless Dome (18,522); Syracuse, NY
March 4, 2023; 5:00 p.m., ACCRSN		Wake Forest	W 72–63	17–14 (10–10)	27 – Edwards	20 – Edwards	5 – Mintz	JMA Wireless Dome (24,590); Syracuse, NY
ACC Tournament
March 8, 2023; 12:00 p.m., ESPN	(8)	vs. (9) Wake Forest; Second round	L 74–77	17–15	18 – Tied	11 – Williams	7 – Mintz	Greensboro Coliseum (17,685); Greensboro, NC
*Non-conference game. ^{#}Rankings from AP Poll. (#) Tournament seedings in parentheses. All times are in Eastern Time.

== Rankings ==
Ranking movements Legend: ██ Increase in ranking ██ Decrease in ranking — = Not ranked RV = Received votes
	Week																			
Poll	Pre	1	2	3	4	5	6	7	8	9	10	11	12	13	14	15	16	17	18	Final
AP	—	—	—	—	—	—	—	—	—	—	—	—	—	—	—	—	—	—	—	Not released
Coaches	RV	—	—	—	—	—	—	—	—	—	—	—	—	—	—	—	—	—	—	—

*AP does not release post-NCAA Tournament rankings
