= 2023 Patriot League men's basketball tournament =

Conference postseason tournament

- Classification: Division I
- Season: 2022–23
- Teams: 10
- Site: Campus sites
- Champions: Colgate (6th title)
- Winning coach: Matt Langel (4th title)
- Television: ESPN+, CBSSN

The 2023 Patriot League Men's Basketball Tournament was the conference postseason tournament for the Patriot League. The tournament was held February 28, March 2, 5, and 8, 2023 at campus sites of the higher seeds. The winner, Colgate, received the conference's automatic bid to the NCAA Tournament.

2022–23 Patriot League men's basketball standings
	Conf.				Overall
Team	W		L	PCT	W		L	PCT
Colgate†	17	–	1	.944	26	–	9	.743
Navy	11	–	7	.611	18	–	13	.581
Lehigh	11	–	7	.611	16	–	14	.533
Army	10	–	8	.556	17	–	16	.515
Boston University	8	–	10	.444	15	–	17	.469
Lafayette	7	–	11	.389	11	–	23	.324
American	7	–	11	.389	17	–	15	.531
Loyola	7	–	11	.389	13	–	20	.394
Holy Cross	7	–	11	.389	10	–	22	.313
Bucknell	5	–	13	.278	12	–	20	.375
† 2023 Patriot League tournament winner

== Seeds ==
All ten teams in the conference standings qualify for the tournament. The teams will be seeded by record in conference, with a tiebreaker system to seed teams with identical conference records.

The two tiebreakers used by the Patriot League are: 1) head-to-head record of teams with identical record and 2) NCAA NET Rankings available on day following the conclusion of Patriot League regular season play.

Seed	School	Conference	Tiebreaker 1	Tiebreaker 2
1	Colgate	17–1		
2	Navy	11–7	1–1 vs. Lehigh	2–0 vs. Army
3	Lehigh	11–7	1–1 vs. Navy	0–2 vs. Army
4	Army	10–8		
5	Boston University	8–10		
6	Lafayette	7–11	4–2 vs. American/Loyola/Holy Cross	
7	American	7–11	3–3 vs. Lafayette/Loyola/Holy Cross	1–1 vs. Colgate
8	Loyola	7–11	3–3 vs. Lafayette/American/Holy Cross	0–2 vs. Colgate
9	Holy Cross	7–11	2–4 vs. Lafayette/American/Loyola	
10	Bucknell	5–13		

== Schedule ==
Game	Time	Matchup	Score	Television	Attendance
First round – Tuesday, February 28
1	7:00 p.m.	No. 7 American vs. No. 10 Bucknell	64–59	ESPN+	1,019
2	7:00 p.m.	No. 8 Loyola vs No. 9 Holy Cross	73–69	ESPN+	1,047
Quarterfinals – Thursday, March 2
3	7:00 p.m.	No. 1 Colgate vs. No. 8 Loyola	92–73	ESPN+	1,279
4	7:00 p.m.	No. 2 Navy vs. No. 7 American	59–64	ESPN+	986
5	7:00 p.m.	No. 3 Lehigh vs. No. 6 Lafayette	64–71	ESPN+	2,095
6	6:00 p.m.	No. 4 Army vs. No. 5 Boston University	71–69	ESPN+	681
Semifinals – Sunday, March 5
7	2:00 p.m.	No. 1 Colgate vs. No. 4 Army	91–74	CBSSN	1,327
8	4:00 p.m.	No. 7 American vs. No. 6 Lafayette	76–84^{2OT}	CBSSN	2,016
Championship – Wednesday, March 8
9	7:30 p.m.	No. 1 Colgate vs. No. 6 Lafayette	79–61	CBSSN	1,891
Game times in ET. Rankings denote tournament seeding. All games hosted by higher-seeded team.

== Bracket ==
First round Tuesday, February 28, 2023; ESPN+
8	Loyola (MD)	73
9	Holy Cross	69
7	American	64
10	Bucknell	59

Quarterfinals; Thursday March 2, 2023; ESPN+
1	Colgate	92
8	Loyola (MD)	73
4	Army	71*
5	Boston University	69
2	Navy	51
7	American	52
3	Lehigh	64
6	Lafayette	71

Semifinals; Sunday, March 5, 2023; CBSSN
1	Colgate	91
4	Army	74
7	American	76
6	Lafayette	84**

Championship; Wednesday, March 8, 2023; CBSSN
1	Colgate	79
6	Lafayette	61

* denotes overtime period
