= 2022–23 Holy Cross Crusaders men's basketball team =

American college basketball season

2022–23 Holy Cross Crusaders men's basketball
- Conference: Patriot League
- Record: 10–22 (7–11 Patriot)
- Head coach: Brett Nelson (4th season)
- Assistant coaches: R.J. Evans; Sam Ferry; Anthony Richards
- Home arena: Hart Center

2022–23 Patriot League men's basketball standings
	Conf.				Overall
Team	W		L	PCT	W		L	PCT
Colgate†	17	–	1	.944	26	–	9	.743
Navy	11	–	7	.611	18	–	13	.581
Lehigh	11	–	7	.611	16	–	14	.533
Army	10	–	8	.556	17	–	16	.515
Boston University	8	–	10	.444	15	–	17	.469
Lafayette	7	–	11	.389	11	–	23	.324
American	7	–	11	.389	17	–	15	.531
Loyola	7	–	11	.389	13	–	20	.394
Holy Cross	7	–	11	.389	10	–	22	.313
Bucknell	5	–	13	.278	12	–	20	.375
† 2023 Patriot League tournament winner

The 2022–23 Holy Cross Crusaders men's basketball team represented the College of the Holy Cross in the 2022–23 NCAA Division I men's basketball season. The Crusaders, led by fourth-year head coach Brett Nelson, played their home games at the Hart Center in Worcester, Massachusetts as members of the Patriot League. they finished the season 10–22, 7–11 in Patriot League play to finish in a four-way tie for sixth place. As the No. 9 seed in the Patriot League tournament, they lost to Loyola (MD) in the first round.

On March 10, 2023, the school fired head coach Brett Nelson. On March 30, the school named Fordham assistant coach Dave Paulsen the team's new head coach.

== Previous season ==
The Crusaders finished the 2021–22 season 9–22, 7–11 in Patriot League play to finish in a tie for seventh place. In the Patriot League tournament, they were defeated by American in the first round.

== Roster ==
2022–23 Holy Cross Crusaders men's basketball team
Players
Coaches

Pos.	#	Name	Height	Weight	Year	Previous school	Hometown
G	0	Bo Montgomery	6 ft 2 in (1.88 m)	207 lb (94 kg)	Jr	Lausanne Collegiate School	Memphis, Tennessee
G	1	Joe Octave	6 ft 4 in (1.93 m)	207 lb (94 kg)	Jr	Mary Star of the Sea High School	Gardena, California
G	4	Ben Capron	6 ft 0 in (1.83 m)	160 lb (73 kg)	Fr	Phillipsburg High School	Phillipsburg, New Jersey
G	5	Jaden Kirkwood	6 ft 5 in (1.96 m)	222 lb (101 kg)	Fr	IMG Academy	Ottawa, Ontario
F	10	Gerrale Gates	6 ft 6 in (1.98 m)	237 lb (108 kg)	Sr	David W. Butler High School	Charlotte, North Carolina
G	11	Will Batchelder	6 ft 1 in (1.85 m)	180 lb (82 kg)	Fr	Governor's Academy	Newburyport, Massachusetts
F	14	Simon Wilbar	6 ft 11 in (2.11 m)	240 lb (109 kg)	Jr	Canterbury School	Fort Myers, Florida
G	15	Jade Tse	6 ft 1 in (1.85 m)	193 lb (88 kg)	Jr	Deerfield Academy	Queens, New York
G	20	Mike Piwko	6 ft 4 in (1.93 m)	205 lb (93 kg)	So	Sparta High School	Sparta, New Jersey
G	21	Nolan Dorsey	6 ft 5 in (1.96 m)	205 lb (93 kg)	Jr	Millbrook High School	Knightdale, North Carolina
F	22	Austin Lewis	6 ft 11 in (2.11 m)	190 lb (86 kg)	So	Bosco Institute	Frisco, Texas
F	32	Michael Rabinovich	6 ft 10 in (2.08 m)	238 lb (108 kg)	Jr	Worcester Academy	Hopkinton, Massachusetts
F	33	Caleb Kenney	6 ft 6 in (1.98 m)	217 lb (98 kg)	So	Douglas Freeman High School	Richmond, Virginia
F	44	Louth-M Coulibaly	6 ft 9 in (2.06 m)	245 lb (111 kg)	Jr	Canada Topflight Academy	Ottawa, Ontario

Head coach

- Brett Nelson (Florida)

Assistant coach(es)

- R.J. Evans (Connecticut)
- Sam Ferry (Vanderbilt)
- Anthony Richards (Le Moyne)

Legend

- (C) Team captain
- (S) Suspended
- (I) Ineligible
- (W) Walk-on
- Injured
- Current redshirt

Roster
Last update: December 27, 2022

== Schedule and results ==
Date time, TV	Rank^{#}	Opponent^{#}	Result	Record	Site (attendance) city, state
Non-conference regular season
November 7, 2022*; 7:00 pm, ESPN+		Siena	L 68–75	0–1	Hart Center (1,681); Worcester, MA
November 10, 2022*; 7:00 pm, ESPN+		Dean	W 85–71	1–1	Hart Center (718); Worcester, MA
November 14, 2022*; 9:00 pm, CBSSN		at No. 10 Creighton	L 65–94	1–2	CHI Health Center Omaha (15,940); Omaha, NE
November 19, 2022*; 7:30 pm		vs. Stonehill; Tom Konchalski Classic	L 79–81	1–3	Rose Hill Gymnasium (681); Bronx, NY
November 21, 2022*; 7:00 pm, SNY/ESPN+		at Fordham; Tom Konchalski Classic	L 53–67	1–4	Rose Hill Gymnasium (450); Bronx, NY
November 22, 2022*; 4:00 pm		vs. UIC; Tom Konchalski Classic	L 66–89	1–5	Rose Hill Gymnasium (373); Bronx, NY
November 27, 2022*; 1:00 pm, ESPN+		Colby–Sawyer	W 95–61	2–5	Hart Center (683); Worcester, MA
November 30, 2022*; 7:00 pm, ESPN+		Harvard	L 38–72	2–6	Hart Center (1,117); Worcester, MA
December 3, 2022*; 6:00 pm, NBCSB/ESPN+		Central Connecticut	W 63–57	3–6	Hart Center (1,263); Worcester, MA
December 7, 2022*; 7:00 pm, ESPN+		Quinnipiac	L 71–75	3–7	Hart Center (1,017); Worcester, MA
December 10, 2022*; 2:00 pm, NESN		at Northeastern	L 58–59	3–8	Matthews Arena (837); Boston, MA
December 19, 2022*; 7:00 pm, ESPN+		at New Hampshire	L 60–78	3–9	Lundholm Gym (460); Durham, NH
December 22, 2022*; 11:30 am, NEC Front Row		at Sacred Heart	L 62–66	3–10	William H. Pitt Center (563); Fairfield, CT
Patriot League regular season
December 30, 2022; 2:00 pm, ESPN+		Bucknell	W 60–58	4–10 (1–0)	Hart Center (1,424); Worcester, MA
January 2, 2023; 1:00 pm, ESPN+		at Navy	W 74–63	5–10 (2–0)	Alumni Hall (686); Annapolis, MD
January 5, 2023; 7:00 pm, ESPN+		American	L 68–73	5–11 (2–1)	Hart Center (731); Worcester, MA
January 8, 2023; 1:00 pm, ESPN+		Loyola (MD)	W 63–55	6–11 (3–1)	Hart Center (717); Worcester, MA
January 11, 2023; 7:00 pm, ESPN+		at Lehigh	L 58–76	6–12 (3–2)	Stabler Arena (556); Bethlehem, PA
January 14, 2023; 1:00 pm, ESPN+		at Lafayette	L 48–62	6–13 (3–3)	Kirby Sports Center (1,776); Easton, PA
January 18, 2023; 7:00 pm, ESPN+		Colgate	L 71–77	6–14 (3–4)	Hart Center (1,107); Worcester, MA
January 21, 2023; 2:00 pm, ESPN+		at Bucknell	W 80–73	7–14 (4–4)	Sojka Pavilion (1,219); Lewisburg, PA
January 25, 2023; 7:00 pm, ESPN+		Lehigh	L 68–74	7–15 (4–5)	Hart Center (1,144); Worcester, MA
January 28, 2023; 1:00 pm, ESPN+		at Army	L 55–66	7–16 (4–6)	Christl Arena (1,001); West Point, NY
February 1, 2023; 7:00 pm, ESPN+		at Boston University; Turnpike Trophy	W 82–70	8–16 (5–6)	Case Gym (659); Boston, MA
February 4, 2023; 2:00 pm, NBCSB/ESPN+		Navy	L 68–86	8–17 (5–7)	Hart Center (1,753); Worcester, MA
February 6, 2023; 7:00 pm, ESPN+		Lafayette	L 58–72	8–18 (5–8)	Hart Center (1,361); Worcester, MA
February 11, 2023; 2:00 pm, ESPN+		at American	W 74–66	9–18 (6–8)	Bender Arena (878); Washington, D.C.
February 15, 2023; 7:00 pm, ESPN+		Boston University; Turnpike Trophy	W 71–69	10–18 (7–8)	Hart Center (1,043); Worcester, MA
February 18, 2023; 2:00 pm, ESPN+		at Colgate	L 73–96	10–19 (7–9)	Cotterell Court (1,096); Hamilton, NY
February 22, 2023; 7:00 pm, ESPN+		at Loyola (MD)	L 68–90	10–20 (7–10)	Reitz Arena (589); Baltimore, MD
February 25, 2023; 2:00 pm, ESPN+		Army	L 65–80	10–21 (7–11)	Hart Center (1,254); Worcester, MA
Patriot League tournament
February 28, 2023; 7:00 pm, ESPN+	(9)	at (8) Loyola (MD); First round	L 69–73	10–22	Reitz Arena (1,047); Baltimore, MD
*Non-conference game. ^{#}Rankings from AP Poll. (#) Tournament seedings in parentheses. All times are in Eastern.
