= 2022–23 Saint Francis Red Flash men's basketball team =

American college basketball season

2022–23 Saint Francis Red Flash men's basketball
- Conference: Northeast Conference
- Record: 13–18 (9–7 NEC)
- Head coach: Rob Krimmel (11th season)
- Associate head coach: Andrew Helton
- Assistant coaches: Eric Taylor; Luke McConnell
- Home arena: DeGol Arena

2022–23 Northeast Conference men's basketball standings
	Conf.				Overall
Team	W		L	PCT	W		L	PCT
Merrimack*†	12	–	4	.750	18	–	16	.529
Fairleigh Dickinson^	10	–	6	.625	21	–	16	.568
Stonehill**	10	–	6	.625	14	–	17	.452
Saint Francis (PA)	9	–	7	.563	13	–	18	.419
Sacred Heart	8	–	8	.500	16	–	17	.485
Wagner	8	–	8	.500	15	–	13	.536
Central Connecticut	7	–	9	.438	10	–	22	.313
St. Francis Brooklyn	7	–	9	.438	14	–	16	.467
LIU	1	–	15	.063	3	–	26	.103
† 2023 NEC tournament winner: * ineligible for the 2023 NCAA tournament due to transition period; ** ineligible for both the 2023 NEC tournament and the 2023 NCAA tournament due to transition period; ^ received automatic bid for the 2023 NCAA tournament as conference tournament runner-up, due to Merrimack's ineligibility

The 2022–23 Saint Francis Red Flash men's basketball team represented Saint Francis University in the 2022–23 NCAA Division I men's basketball season. The Red Flash, led by 11th-year head coach Rob Krimmel, played their home games at the DeGol Arena in Loretto, Pennsylvania as members of the Northeast Conference.

== Previous season ==
The Red Flash finished the 2021–22 season 9–21, 5–13 in NEC play to finish in a tie for eighth place. In the NEC tournament, they were defeated by Wagner in the quarterfinals.

== Roster ==
2022–23 Saint Francis Red Flash men's basketball team
Players
Coaches

Pos.	#	Name	Height	Weight	Year	Previous school	Hometown
G	0	Cam Gregory	6 ft 5 in (1.96 m)	165 lb (75 kg)	Fr	Steward School	Accokeek, MD
G	1	Zahree Harrison	6 ft 0 in (1.83 m)	185 lb (84 kg)	Jr	Cheltenham HS	West Philadelphia, PA
F	2	Miles Webb	6 ft 8 in (2.03 m)	190 lb (86 kg)	Fr	St. Stephen's & St. Agnes School	Arlington, VA
G	3	Luke Ruggery	5 ft 11 in (1.8 m)	165 lb (75 kg)	RS Jr	Bishop Guilfoyle HS	Duncansville, PA
G	4	Ronell Giles Jr.	6 ft 5 in (1.96 m)	200 lb (91 kg)	Jr	Charles Herbert Flowers HS	Brandywine, MD
F	5	Myles Thompson	6 ft 7 in (2.01 m)	245 lb (111 kg)	RS Sr	Camden High School	Camden, NJ
G/F	11	Maxwell Land	6 ft 4 in (1.93 m)	185 lb (84 kg)	Jr	Archbishop Moeller HS	Cincinnati, OH
F	13	Marlon Hargis	6 ft 7 in (2.01 m)	205 lb (93 kg)	RS Sr	Holy Cross	Mays Landing, NJ
G	14	Landon Moore	6 ft 3 in (1.91 m)	200 lb (91 kg)	Fr	Western Reserve Academy	Bloomington, IL
G	15	Alexander Derkits	6 ft 0 in (1.83 m)	160 lb (73 kg)	Fr	Whitehall HS	Whitehall, PA
G	20	Brendan Scanlon	5 ft 8 in (1.73 m)	175 lb (79 kg)	So	Saint Joseph's	State College, PA
F	21	Gestin Liberis	6 ft 9 in (2.06 m)	215 lb (98 kg)	Fr	George School	Havertown, PA
G	22	Darian Callaway	6 ft 3 in (1.91 m)	185 lb (84 kg)	Jr	St. Mary's (MD)	Laurel, MD
G	23	Wisler Sanon II	6 ft 4 in (1.93 m)	190 lb (86 kg)	Fr	Paul VI HS	Sicklerville, NJ
G	24	Keshawn McNeill	6 ft 1 in (1.85 m)	180 lb (82 kg)	Fr	Zama American Middle HS	Camp Zama, Japan
G	31	Brad McCabe	6 ft 6 in (1.98 m)	210 lb (95 kg)	RS Jr	Manasquan HS	Manasquan, NJ
F	33	Josh Cohen	6 ft 10 in (2.08 m)	220 lb (100 kg)	RS Jr	Christian Brothers Academy	Lincroft, NJ
F	42	Daric Danchanko	6 ft 8 in (2.03 m)	240 lb (109 kg)	Fr	Central Cambria HS	Ebensburg, PA

Head coach

- Rob Krimmel (Saint Francis (PA))

Assistant coach(es)

- Andrew Helton (Miami (OH))
- Eric Taylor (Saint Francis (PA))
- Luke McConnell (Saint Francis (PA))

Legend

- (C) Team captain
- (S) Suspended
- (I) Ineligible
- (W) Walk-on
- Injured
- Current redshirt

Roster
Last update: December 14, 2022

== Schedule and results ==
Date time, TV	Rank^{#}	Opponent^{#}	Result	Record	Site (attendance) city, state
Non-conference regular season
November 7, 2022*; 7:00 pm, ESPN+		at St. Bonaventure	L 58–71	0–1	Reilly Center (3,436); Olean, NY
November 12, 2022*; 7:00 pm, NEC Front Row		Hartford; Jack Phelan Classic	W 77–53	1–1	DeGol Arena (787); Loretto, PA
November 14, 2022*; 7:00 pm, NEC Front Row		Cornell	L 77–80	1–2	DeGol Arena (758); Loretto, PA
November 17, 2022*; 6:30 pm, FS2		at Butler	L 67–95	1–3	Hinkle Fieldhouse (7,255); Indianapolis, IN
November 21, 2022*; 7:00 pm, NEC Front Row		Lehigh	L 76–82	1–4	DeGol Arena (738); Loretto, PA
November 23, 2022*; 7:00 pm, NEC Front Row		Franciscan	W 120–53	2–4	DeGol Arena (416); Loretto, PA
November 26, 2022*; 7:00 pm, NEC Front Row		American	L 55–66	2–5	DeGol Arena (373); Loretto, PA
November 30, 2022*; 7:00 pm, ESPN+		at Bucknell	L 65–89	2–6	Sojka Pavilion (847); Lewisburg, PA
December 3, 2022*; 12:00 pm, BTN		at No. 25 Ohio State	L 59–96	2–7	Value City Arena (10,398); Columbus, OH
December 8, 2022*; 7:30 pm, NEC Front Row		Saint Vincent	W 88–58	3–7	DeGol Arena (616); Loretto, PA
December 11, 2022*; 10:00 pm, ESPN+		at Hawai'i	L 66–90	3–8	Stan Sheriff Center; Honolulu, HI
December 17, 2022*; 12:00 pm, ACCNX		at No. 25 Miami (FL)	L 76–91	3–9	Watsco Center (4,029); Coral Gables, FL
December 21, 2023*; 7:00 pm, ESPN+		at Robert Morris	L 66–77	3–10	UPMC Events Center (841); Moon Township, PA
NEC regular season
December 29, 2022; 7:00 pm, NEC Front Row		Central Connecticut	W 80–72	4–10 (1–0)	DeGol Arena (401); Loretto, PA
December 31, 2022; 4:00 pm, NEC Front Row		Stonehill	W 73–72	5–10 (2–0)	DeGol Arena (355); Loretto, PA
January 7, 2023; 4:00 pm, NEC Front Row		at Wagner	W 68–63	6–10 (3–0)	Spiro Sports Center (479); Staten Island, NY
January 14, 2023; 4:00 pm, NEC Front Row		LIU	W 87–68	7–10 (4–0)	DeGol Arena (485); Loretto, PA
January 16, 2023; 2:00 pm, NEC Front Row		at Sacred Heart	L 51–54	7–11 (4–1)	William H. Pitt Center (529); Fairfield, CT
January 20, 2023; 7:00 pm, NEC Front Row		St. Francis Brooklyn	W 87–61	8–11 (5–1)	DeGol Arena (920); Loretto, PA
January 26, 2023; 7:00 pm, NEC Front Row		at Fairleigh Dickinson	L 82–87	8–12 (5–2)	Rothman Center (1,003); Hackensack, NJ
January 28, 2023; 1:00 pm, NEC Front Row		at Central Connecticut	L 74–88	8–13 (5–3)	William H. Detrick Gymnasium (722); New Britain, CT
February 2, 2023; 7:00 pm, NEC Front Row		at Stonehill	L 61–74	8–14 (5–4)	Merkert Gymnasium (1,116); Easton, MA
February 4, 2023; 3:00 pm, NEC Front Row		at Merrimack	L 66–70	8–15 (5–5)	Hammel Court (367); North Andover, MA
February 9, 2023; 5:00 pm, ESPNU		Sacred Heart	W 78–76 ^{OT}	9–15 (6–5)	DeGol Arena (670); Loretto, PA
February 11, 2023; 4:00 pm, NEC Front Row		Merrimack	L 68–75	9–16 (6–6)	DeGol Arena (870); Loretto, PA
February 16, 2023; 2:00 pm, NEC Front Row		at St. Francis Brooklyn	W 72–64	10–16 (7–6)	Pratt ARC (189); Brooklyn, NY
February 18, 2023; 1:00 pm, NEC Front Row		at LIU	W 93–82	11–16 (8–6)	Steinberg Wellness Center (323); Brooklyn, NY
February 23, 2023; 7:00 pm, NEC Front Row		Fairleigh Dickinson	W 82–72	12–16 (9–6)	DeGol Arena (798); Loretto, PA
February 25, 2023; 4:00 pm, NEC Front Row		Wagner	L 58–68	12–17 (9–7)	DeGol Arena (954); Loretto, PA
NEC Tournament
March 1, 2023; 7:00 pm, NEC Front Row	(3)	(6) Central Connecticut; Quarterfinals	W 83–69	13–17	DeGol Arena (1,011); Loretto, PA
March 4, 2023; 8:00 pm, ESPN3	(3)	(2) Fairleigh Dickinson; Semifinals	L 50–70	13–18	Rothman Center (1,207); Hackensack, NJ
*Non-conference game. ^{#}Rankings from AP Poll. (#) Tournament seedings in parentheses. All times are in Eastern.
