= 2022–23 Lehigh Mountain Hawks men's basketball team =

American college basketball season

2022–23 Lehigh Mountain Hawks men's basketball
- Conference: Patriot League
- Record: 16–14 (11–7 Patriot)
- Head coach: Brett Reed (16th season)
- Associate head coach: Harry Morra
- Assistant coaches: Willie Jenkins; Sean Hoehn
- Home arena: Stabler Arena

2022–23 Patriot League men's basketball standings
	Conf.				Overall
Team	W		L	PCT	W		L	PCT
Colgate†	17	–	1	.944	26	–	9	.743
Navy	11	–	7	.611	18	–	13	.581
Lehigh	11	–	7	.611	16	–	14	.533
Army	10	–	8	.556	17	–	16	.515
Boston University	8	–	10	.444	15	–	17	.469
Lafayette	7	–	11	.389	11	–	23	.324
American	7	–	11	.389	17	–	15	.531
Loyola	7	–	11	.389	13	–	20	.394
Holy Cross	7	–	11	.389	10	–	22	.313
Bucknell	5	–	13	.278	12	–	20	.375
† 2023 Patriot League tournament winner

The 2022–23 Lehigh Mountain Hawks men's basketball team represented Lehigh University in the 2022–23 NCAA Division I men's basketball season. The Mountain Hawks, led by 16th-year head coach Brett Reed, played their home games at Stabler Arena in Bethlehem, Pennsylvania as members of the Patriot League. They finished the season 16–14, 11–7 in Patriot League play to finish in a tie for second place. As the No. 3 seed in the Patriot League tournament, they lost to Lafayette in the quarterfinals.

== Previous season ==
The Mountain Hawks finished the 2021–22 season 13–19, 10–8 in Patriot League play to finish in fourth place. They defeated Army in the quarterfinals of the Patriot League tournament, before falling to top-seeded Colgate in the semifinals.

== Roster ==
2022–23 Lehigh Mountain Hawks men's basketball team
Players
Coaches

Pos.	#	Name	Height	Weight	Year	Previous school	Hometown
F	0	Jakob Alamudun	6 ft 6 in (1.98 m)	230 lb (104 kg)	Sr	Marina HS	Huntington Beach, CA
G	2	Jake Betlow	6 ft 2 in (1.88 m)	185 lb (84 kg)	Sr	St. Benedict's Prep	Mendham, NJ
G	4	Reed Fenton	6 ft 4 in (1.93 m)	185 lb (84 kg)	Sr	Greater Latrobe HS	Latrobe, PA
G	5	Evan Taylor	6 ft 6 in (1.98 m)	205 lb (93 kg)	Sr	Glenbard West HS	Glen Ellyn, IL
G	11	Brendan Reed	5 ft 11 in (1.8 m)	175 lb (79 kg)	Fr	Allentown Central Catholic HS	Bethlehem, PA
G	13	Keith Higgins Jr.	6 ft 4 in (1.93 m)	195 lb (88 kg)	So	Chaminade Prep	West Hills, CA
G	15	Luke Traina	6 ft 5 in (1.96 m)	185 lb (84 kg)	Sr	Germantown Academy	Doylestown, PA
G	20	Jayshen Saigal	6 ft 2 in (1.88 m)	175 lb (79 kg)	Jr	Scarsdale HS	Scarsdale, NY
F	21	Burke Chebuhar	6 ft 8 in (2.03 m)	230 lb (104 kg)	Jr	The Walker School	Marietta, GA
G	22	Tyler Whitney-Sidney	6 ft 2 in (1.88 m)	180 lb (82 kg)	So	Brooks School	Somerville, MA
F	23	Bube Momah	6 ft 8 in (2.03 m)	235 lb (107 kg)	Fr	Brewster Academy	Unionville, CT
G	25	Ben Knostman	6 ft 5 in (1.96 m)	182 lb (83 kg)	So	Tippecanoe HS	Dayton, OH
C	32	Henri Adiassa	6 ft 11 in (2.11 m)	240 lb (109 kg)	Fr	Crossroads School	Yaoundé, Cameroon
F/C	35	Dominic Parolin	6 ft 9 in (2.06 m)	245 lb (111 kg)	Jr	Centennial Secondary School	Coquitlam, BC
C	42	JT Tan	6 ft 8 in (2.03 m)	280 lb (127 kg)	Jr	Rolling Hills Prep	Redondo Beach, CA
C	44	Tommy Conniff	6 ft 11 in (2.11 m)	235 lb (107 kg)	Fr	Oratory Prep	Summit, NJ
G	55	Jalin Sinclair	5 ft 10 in (1.78 m)	182 lb (83 kg)	Jr	Suffield Academy	Manhattan, NY

Head coach

- Brett Reed (Wayne State (MI))

Assistant coach(es)

- Harry Morra (DeSales)
- Willie Jenkins (Tennessee Tech)
- Sean Hoehn (Sacred Heart)

Legend

- (C) Team captain
- (S) Suspended
- (I) Ineligible
- (W) Walk-on
- Injured
- Current redshirt

Roster
Last update: November 25, 2022

== Schedule and results ==
Date time, TV	Rank^{#}	Opponent^{#}	Result	Record	Site (attendance) city, state
Non-conference regular season
November 7, 2022*; 8:00 pm, ESPN+		at Syracuse	L 72–90	0–1	JMA Wireless Dome (17,755); Syracuse, NY
November 10, 2022*; 6:00 pm, ACCN		at Virginia Tech	L 52–78	0–2	Cassell Coliseum (7,541); Blacksburg, VA
November 13, 2022*; 4:00 pm, ESPN+		Misericordia	W 97–58	1–2	Stabler Arena (773); Bethlehem, PA
November 16, 2022*; 7:00 pm, ESPN+		Marist	W 64–54	2–2	Stabler Arena (568); Bethlehem, PA
November 21, 2022*; 7:00 pm, NEC Front Row		at Saint Francis (PA)	W 82–76	3–2	DeGol Arena (738); Loretto, PA
November 27, 2022*; 7:00 pm, ESPN+		Monmouth	W 80–76	4–2	Stabler Arena (531); Bethlehem, PA
November 30, 2022*; 7:00 pm		at Maryland Eastern Shore	L 60–64	4–3	Hytche Athletic Center (434); Princess Anne, MD
December 3, 2022*; 2:00 pm, ESPN+		UMBC	L 62–88	4–4	Stabler Arena (596); Bethlehem, PA
December 15, 2022*; 7:00 pm, BTN		at No. 22 Wisconsin	L 56–78	4–5	Kohl Center (12,760); Madison, WI
December 17, 2022*; 7:00 pm, ESPN+		St. Elizabeth	W 94–36	5–5	Stabler Arena (469); Bethlehem, PA
December 20, 2022*; 5:00 pm, ESPN+		at Cornell	L 64–96	5–6	Newman Arena (517); Ithaca, NY
Patriot League regular season
December 30, 2022; 6:00 pm, ESPN+		at Army	L 78–80	5–7 (0–1)	Christl Arena (1,231); West Point, NY
January 2, 2023; 7:00 pm, ESPN+		Colgate	L 60–76	5–8 (0–2)	Stabler Arena (832); Bethlehem, PA
January 5, 2023; 7:00 pm, ESPN+		at Bucknell	W 72–64	6–8 (1–2)	Sojka Pavilion (747); Lewisburg, PA
January 8, 2023; 2:00 pm, ESPN+		at Navy	W 78–73	7–8 (2–2)	Alumni Hall (848); Annapolis, MD
January 11, 2023; 7:00 pm, ESPN+		Holy Cross	W 76–58	8–8 (3–2)	Stabler Arena (556); Bethlehem, PA
January 14, 2023; 2:00 pm, ESPN+		American	W 78–62	9–8 (4–2)	Stabler Arena (755); Bethlehem, PA
January 16, 2023; 7:00 pm, CBSSN		at Loyola (MD)	W 74–70	10–8 (5–2)	Reitz Arena (1,124); Baltimore, MD
January 21, 2023; 7:00 pm, ESPN+		Lafayette	W 61–49	11–8 (6–2)	Stabler Arena (1,046); Bethlehem, PA
January 25, 2023; 6:00 pm, ESPN+		at Holy Cross	W 74–68	12–8 (7–2)	Hart Center (1,144); Worcester, MA
January 29, 2023; 12:00 pm, CBSSN		Boston University	W 66–55	13–8 (8–2)	Stabler Arena (764); Bethlehem, PA
February 1, 2023; 7:00 pm, ESPN+		Army	L 69–71	13–9 (8–3)	Stabler Arena (954); Bethlehem, PA
February 4, 2023; 1:00 pm, ESPN+		at Lafayette	W 66–64	14–9 (9–3)	Kirby Sports Center (2,013); Easton, PA
February 8, 2023; 7:00 pm, ESPN+		at Colgate	L 53–81	14–10 (9–4)	Cotterell Court (769); Hamilton, NY
February 11, 2023; 7:00 pm, ESPN+		Loyola (MD)	L 82–91	14–11 (9–5)	Stabler Arena (1,351); Bethlehem, PA
February 15, 2023; 7:00 pm, ESPN+		Navy	L 64–75	14–12 (9–6)	Stabler Arena (1,376); Bethlehem, PA
February 18, 2023; 2:00 pm, ESPN+		at American	W 62–59	15–12 (10–6)	Bender Arena (684); Washington, D.C.
February 22, 2023; 7:00 pm, ESPN+		Bucknell	W 78–62	16–12 (11–6)	Stabler Arena (908); Bethlehem, PA
February 25, 2023; 1:00 pm, ESPN+		at Boston University	L 56–59	16–13 (11–7)	Case Gym; Boston, MA
Patriot League tournament
March 2, 2023; 7:00 pm, ESPN+	(3)	(6) Lafayette; Quarterfinals	L 64–71	16–14	Stabler Arena (2,095); Bethlehem, PA
*Non-conference game. ^{#}Rankings from AP Poll. (#) Tournament seedings in parentheses. All times are in Eastern.
