= 2022–23 Boston University Terriers men's basketball team =

American college basketball season

2022–23 Boston University Terriers men's basketball
- Conference: Patriot League
- Record: 15–17 (8–10 Patriot)
- Head coach: Joe Jones (12th season)
- Assistant coaches: Curtis Wilson; Walt Corbean; Mike Quinn
- Home arena: Case Gym

2022–23 Patriot League men's basketball standings
	Conf.				Overall
Team	W		L	PCT	W		L	PCT
Colgate†	17	–	1	.944	26	–	9	.743
Navy	11	–	7	.611	18	–	13	.581
Lehigh	11	–	7	.611	16	–	14	.533
Army	10	–	8	.556	17	–	16	.515
Boston University	8	–	10	.444	15	–	17	.469
Lafayette	7	–	11	.389	11	–	23	.324
American	7	–	11	.389	17	–	15	.531
Loyola	7	–	11	.389	13	–	20	.394
Holy Cross	7	–	11	.389	10	–	22	.313
Bucknell	5	–	13	.278	12	–	20	.375
† 2023 Patriot League tournament winner

The 2022–23 Boston University Terriers men's basketball team represented Boston University in the 2022–23 NCAA Division I men's basketball season. The Terriers, led by 12th-year head coach Joe Jones, played their home games at Case Gym in Boston, Massachusetts as members of the Patriot League.

== Previous season ==
The Terriers finished the 2021–22 season 22–13, 11–7 in Patriot League play to finish in third place. In the Patriot League tournament, they defeated Loyola (MD) in the quarterfinals, before falling to Navy in the semifinals. They were invited to the CBI, where they defeated UNC Greensboro in the first round, before falling to Middle Tennessee in the quarterfinals.

== Roster ==
2022–23 Boston University Terriers men's basketball team
Players
Coaches

Pos.	#	Name	Height	Weight	Year	Previous school	Hometown
G	0	Ethan Brittain-Watts	6 ft 2 in (1.88 m)	180 lb (82 kg)	Sr	Culver Academies	Indianapolis, IN
G	2	Caelan Jones	6 ft 5 in (1.96 m)	190 lb (86 kg)	Jr	Vermont Academy	Los Angeles, CA
F	3	Malcolm Chimezie	6 ft 8 in (2.03 m)	220 lb (100 kg)	So	Stepinac HS	Yonkers, NY
G/F	5	Walter Whyte	6 ft 6 in (1.98 m)	210 lb (95 kg)	GS	St. Luke's School	New Haven, CT
G	13	Daman Tate	6 ft 5 in (1.96 m)	190 lb (86 kg)	Jr	Cushing Academy	Roxbury, MA
F	14	Nic Nobili	6 ft 10 in (2.08 m)	220 lb (100 kg)	Fr	Paul VI HS	Bologna, Italy
G	15	Jonas Harper	6 ft 2 in (1.88 m)	190 lb (86 kg)	GS	St. Luke's School	Stamford, CT
G	20	Jordan Tab	6 ft 2 in (1.88 m)	185 lb (84 kg)	Sr	Torrey Pines HS	San Diego, CA
F	21	Andrew Patnode	6 ft 8 in (2.03 m)	230 lb (104 kg)	Jr	Perkiomen School	Saratoga Springs, NY
G/F	22	Anthony Morales	6 ft 8 in (2.03 m)	195 lb (88 kg)	Jr	Beaver Country Day School	Boston, MA
G	24	Miles Brewster	6 ft 3 in (1.91 m)	175 lb (79 kg)	Jr	Hotchkiss School	Brooklyn, NY
F	25	Nevin Zink	6 ft 9 in (2.06 m)	230 lb (104 kg)	Sr	St. Andrew's School	Newtown, CT
G	30	Ben Roy	6 ft 2 in (1.88 m)	185 lb (84 kg)	Fr	Manasquan HS	Spring Lake Heights, NJ
G	31	Michael Quinn	6 ft 0 in (1.83 m)	180 lb (82 kg)	Sr	Taunton HS	Taunton, MA
F	34	Tim Uzoegbu	6 ft 4 in (1.93 m)	185 lb (84 kg)	Sr	Medway HS	Medway, MA
G/F	35	Fletcher Tynen	6 ft 7 in (2.01 m)	195 lb (88 kg)	GS	Bishop Montgomery HS	Torrance, CA
F	41	Otto Landrum	6 ft 9 in (2.06 m)	215 lb (98 kg)	Fr	Torrey Pines HS	Manitou Springs, CO

Head coach

- Joe Jones (SUNY–Oswego)

Assistant coach(es)

- Curtis Wilson (Adelphi)
- Walt Corbean (Northern Kentucky)
- Mike Quinn (Bentley)

Legend

- (C) Team captain
- (S) Suspended
- (I) Ineligible
- (W) Walk-on
- Injured
- Current redshirt

Roster
Last update: December 27, 2022

== Schedule and results ==
Date time, TV	Rank^{#}	Opponent^{#}	Result	Record	Site (attendance) city, state
Non-conference regular season
November 7, 2022*; 7:30 pm, ESPN+		Northeastern	W 72–63	1–0	Case Gym (1,800); Boston, MA
November 11, 2022*; 6:00 pm, FS2		at UConn	L 57–86	1–1	Harry A. Gampel Pavilion (9,156); Storrs, CT
November 14, 2022*; 7:00 pm, ESPN+		Johnson & Wales	W 96–51	2–1	Case Gym (480); Boston, MA
November 17, 2022*; 7:00 pm, ESPN+		Hartford	W 102–66	3–1	Case Gym (850); Boston, MA
November 20, 2022*; 1:00 pm, ESPN+		at New Hampshire	W 64–57	4–1	Lundholm Gym (634); Durham, NH
November 26, 2022*; 2:00 pm		vs. Southeast Missouri State; Cream City Classic	L 52–63	4–2	Klotsche Center; Milwaukee, WI
November 27, 2022*; 4:00 pm, ESPN+		at Milwaukee; Cream City Classic	L 46–67	4–3	Klotsche Center (1,283); Milwaukee, WI
November 28, 2022*; 2:00 pm		vs. UC Davis; Cream City Classic	L 70–81 ^{OT}	4–4	Klotsche Center; Milwaukee, WI
December 2, 2022*; 7:00 pm		at Merrimack	W 68–54	5–4	Lawler Arena (2,602); North Andover, MA
December 7, 2022*; 7:00 pm, ACCNX/ESPN+		at Notre Dame	L 75–81	5–5	Joyce Center (4,986); South Bend, IN
December 10, 2022*; 7:00 pm, ESPN3		at Marist	W 72–70	6–5	McCann Arena (991); Poughkeepsie, NY
December 13, 2022*; 7:00 pm, ESPN+		Dartmouth	W 67–59	7–5	Case Gym (655); Boston, MA
December 21, 2022*; 4:00 pm, ESPN+		at UMass Lowell	L 60–68	7–6	Costello Athletic Center (452); Lowell, MA
Patriot League regular season
December 30, 2022; 2:00 pm, ESPN+		Navy	L 58–75	7–7 (0–1)	Case Gym (802); Boston, MA
January 2, 2023; 2:00 pm, ESPN+		at Bucknell	W 69–61	8–7 (1–1)	Sojka Pavilion (1,001); Lewisburg, PA
January 5, 2023; 7:00 pm, ESPN+		Lafayette	W 73–69	9–7 (2–1)	Case Gym (435); Boston, MA
January 8, 2023; 2:00 pm, ESPN+		at American	L 74–76	9–8 (2–2)	Bender Arena (2,679); Washington, D.C.
January 11, 2023; 7:00 pm, ESPN+		at Colgate	L 71–77	9–9 (2–3)	Cotterell Court (761); Hamilton, NY
January 14, 2023; 1:00 pm, ESPN+		Army	L 74–83	9–10 (2–4)	Case Gym (610); Boston, MA
January 18, 2023; 7:00 pm, ESPN+		at Navy	L 45–63	9–11 (2–5)	Alumni Hall (948); Annapolis, MD
January 21, 2023; 1:00 pm, ESPN+		Loyola (MD)	W 66–53	10–11 (3–5)	Case Gym (785); Boston, MA
January 23, 2023; 7:00 pm, CBSSN		Colgate	L 51–64	10–12 (3–6)	Case Gym (1,545); Boston, MA
January 29, 2023; 12:00 pm, CBSSN		at Lehigh	L 55–66	10–13 (3–7)	Stabler Arena (764); Bethlehem, PA
February 1, 2023; 7:00 pm, ESPN+		Holy Cross; Turnpike Trophy	L 70–82	10–14 (3–8)	Case Gym (659); Boston, MA
February 4, 2023; 5:00 pm, ESPN+		at Loyola (MD)	W 68–67	11–14 (4–8)	Reitz Arena (873); Baltimore, MD
February 8, 2023; 7:00 pm, ESPN+		American	W 60–54	12–14 (5–8)	Case Gym (775); Boston, MA
February 11, 2023; 1:00 pm, ESPN+		at Lafayette	L 65–69 ^{OT}	12–15 (5–9)	Kirby Sports Center (1,680); Easton, PA
February 15, 2023; 7:00 pm, ESPN+		at Holy Cross; Turnpike Trophy	L 69–71	12–16 (5–10)	Hart Center (1,043); Worcester, MA
February 18, 2023; 1:00 pm, ESPN+		Bucknell	W 77–61	13–16 (6–10)	Case Gym (788); Boston, MA
February 22, 2023; 6:00 pm, ESPN+		at Army	W 73–67	14–16 (7–10)	Christl Arena (869); West Point, NY
February 25, 2023; 1:00 pm, ESPN+		Lehigh	W 59–56	15–16 (8–10)	Case Gym; Boston, MA
Patriot League tournament
March 2, 2023; 6:00 pm, ESPN+	(5)	at (4) Army; Quarterfinals	L 69–71 ^{OT}	15–17	Christl Arena (681); West Point, NY
*Non-conference game. ^{#}Rankings from AP Poll. (#) Tournament seedings in parentheses. All times are in Eastern.
