= 2022–23 American Eagles men's basketball team =

American college basketball season

2022–23 American Eagles men's basketball
- Conference: Patriot League
- Record: 17–15 (7–11 Patriot)
- Head coach: Mike Brennan (10th season)
- Assistant coaches: Eddie Jackson; Jonathan Jones; Sam Roditti
- Home arena: Bender Arena

2022–23 Patriot League men's basketball standings
	Conf.				Overall
Team	W		L	PCT	W		L	PCT
Colgate†	17	–	1	.944	26	–	9	.743
Navy	11	–	7	.611	18	–	13	.581
Lehigh	11	–	7	.611	16	–	14	.533
Army	10	–	8	.556	17	–	16	.515
Boston University	8	–	10	.444	15	–	17	.469
Lafayette	7	–	11	.389	11	–	23	.324
American	7	–	11	.389	17	–	15	.531
Loyola	7	–	11	.389	13	–	20	.394
Holy Cross	7	–	11	.389	10	–	22	.313
Bucknell	5	–	13	.278	12	–	20	.375
† 2023 Patriot League tournament winner

The 2022–23 American Eagles men's basketball team represented American University in the 2022–23 NCAA Division I men's basketball season. The Eagles, led by 10th-year head coach Mike Brennan, played their home games at Bender Arena in Washington, D.C. as members of the Patriot League. They finished the season 17–15, 7–11 in Patriot League play to finish in a four-way tie for sixth place. As the No. 7 seed in the Patriot League tournament, they defeated Bucknell and Navy before losing to Lafayette in the semifinals.

Following the season, head coach Mike Brennan was fired. On April 1, 2023, the school named George Mason assistant coach Duane Simpkins the team's new head coach.

== Previous season ==
The Eagles finished the 2021–22 season 10–22, 5–13 in Patriot League play, to finish in a tie for last place. As the No. 10 seed in the Patriot League tournament, they defeated Holy Cross in the first round, before losing to Navy in the quarterfinals.

== Roster ==
2022–23 American Eagles men's basketball team
Players
Coaches

Pos.	#	Name	Height	Weight	Year	Previous school	Hometown
G	0	Chris Gleaton	6 ft 3 in (1.91 m)	175 lb (79 kg)	Jr	Trinity-Pawling	Thiells, NY
G	1	Victor Jr. Brown	6 ft 4 in (1.93 m)	190 lb (86 kg)	Jr	Lake Highland	Maitland, FL
G	2	Jaxon Knotek	6 ft 6 in (1.98 m)	215 lb (98 kg)	Sr	North Dakota State	River Falls, WI
G	3	Colin Smalls	6 ft 2 in (1.88 m)	185 lb (84 kg)	Jr	St. Andrew's	Upper Marlboro, MD
G	4	Lincoln Ball	6 ft 6 in (1.98 m)	215 lb (98 kg)	Jr	George Washington	Williamsport, MD
F	5	Connor Nelson	6 ft 6 in (1.98 m)	220 lb (100 kg)	GS	Central Wyoming College	Denver, CO
G	10	Ben Lubarsky	6 ft 5 in (1.96 m)	210 lb (95 kg)	Sr	The Benjamin School	Palm Beach, FL
G	12	Geoff Sprouse	6 ft 0 in (1.83 m)	170 lb (77 kg)	Fr	Pembroke Pines	Pembroke Pines, FL
G	13	Deshawn Goodwyn	6 ft 4 in (1.93 m)	185 lb (84 kg)	Fr	George Wythe	Richmond, VA
F	14	Johnny O'Neil	6 ft 9 in (2.06 m)	200 lb (91 kg)	Jr	Chaminade-Madonna	Miami Shores, FL
F	15	Matt Rogers	6 ft 9 in (2.06 m)	220 lb (100 kg)	Jr	St. Maria Goretti	Knoxville, MD
G	20	Lorenzo Donadio	6 ft 4 in (1.93 m)	190 lb (86 kg)	Jr	Boys' Latin	Rome, Italy
G	23	Elijah Stephens	5 ft 9 in (1.75 m)	165 lb (75 kg)	So	China Spring	Waco, TX
F	31	Matt Delaney	6 ft 7 in (2.01 m)	215 lb (98 kg)	So	St. Augustine Prep	Mantua, NJ
C	44	Jermaine Ballisager Webb	7 ft 0 in (2.13 m)	250 lb (113 kg)	Fr	Montverde	Stjær, Denmark
F	45	Mason Whittaker	6 ft 9 in (2.06 m)	210 lb (95 kg)	So	Christ's College	Cust, New Zealand

Head coach

- Mike Brennan (Princeton)

Assistant coach(es)

- Eddie Jackson (Ohio State)
- Jonathan Jones (Kean)
- Sam Roditti (American)

Legend

- (C) Team captain
- (S) Suspended
- (I) Ineligible
- (W) Walk-on
- Injured
- Current redshirt

Roster
Last update: December 11, 2022

== Schedule and results ==
Date time, TV	Rank^{#}	Opponent^{#}	Result	Record	Site (attendance) city, state
Non-conference regular season
November 9, 2022*; 7:00 p.m., ESPN+		at Marist	L 69–73	0–1	McCann Arena (1,155); Poughkeepsie, NY
November 13, 2022*; 4:00 p.m., ESPN+		at George Mason	L 56–73	0–2	EagleBank Arena (3,113); Fairfax, VA
November 16, 2022*; 7:00 p.m., ESPN+		William & Mary	W 71–64	1–2	Bender Arena (1,204); Washington, D.C.
November 19, 2022*; 4:00 p.m., ESPN3		at NJIT	W 58–53	2–2	Wellness and Events Center (478); Newark, NJ
November 23, 2022*; 11:30 a.m., FS2		at Georgetown	W 74–70	3–2	Capital One Arena (3,267); Washington, D.C.
November 26, 2022*; 7:00 p.m., NEC Front Row		at Saint Francis (PA)	W 66–55	4–2	DeGol Arena (373); Loretto, PA
November 29, 2022*; 7:00 p.m., ESPN+		Albany	W 88–62	5–2	Bender Arena (1,009); Washington, D.C.
December 6, 2022*; 7:00 p.m., ESPN+		at Mount St. Mary's	W 69–61	6–2	Knott Arena (1,577); Emmitsburg, MD
December 10, 2022*; 4:00 p.m., ESPN+		at George Washington	W 69–64	7–2	Charles E. Smith Center (1,619); Washington, D.C.
December 13, 2022*; 6:00 p.m., ESPN+		VMI	W 69–61	8–2	Bender Arena (758); Washington, D.C.
December 22, 2022*; 1:00 p.m., ESPN+		Siena	L 61–64	8–3	Bender Arena (612); Washington, D.C.
Patriot League regular season
December 30, 2022; 7:00 p.m., ESPN+		at Lafayette	W 60–47	9–3 (1–0)	Kirby Sports Center (1,796); Easton, PA
January 2, 2023; 2:00 p.m., ESPN+		Loyola (MD)	W 71–55	10–3 (2–0)	Bender Arena (670); Washington, D.C.
January 5, 2023; 7:00 p.m., ESPN+		at Holy Cross	W 73–68	11–3 (3–0)	Hart Center (731); Worcester, MA
January 8, 2023; 2:00 p.m., ESPN+		Boston University	W 76–74	12–3 (4–0)	Bender Arena (2,679); Washington, D.C.
January 11, 2023; 6:00 p.m., ESPN+		at Army	L 60–72	12–4 (4–1)	Christl Arena (553); West Point, NY
January 14, 2023; 2:00 p.m., ESPN+		at Lehigh	L 62–78	12–5 (4–2)	Stabler Arena (755); Bethlehem, PA
January 18, 2023; 7:00 p.m., ESPN+		Lafayette	L 59–70	12–6 (4–3)	Bender Arena (1,207); Washington, D.C.
January 21, 2023; 2:00 p.m., ESPN+		at Colgate	L 61–62	12–7 (4–4)	Cotterell Court (783); Hamilton, NY
January 25, 2023; 7:00 p.m., ESPN+		Army	W 63–61	13–7 (5–4)	Bender Arena (657); Washington, D.C.
January 28, 2023; 2:00 p.m., ESPN+		at Navy	W 73–69	14–7 (6–4)	Alumni Hall (2,100); Annapolis, MD
February 1, 2023; 7:00 p.m., ESPN+		Bucknell	L 71–78	14–8 (6–5)	Bender Arena (632); Washington, D.C.
February 4, 2023; 4:00 p.m., ESPN+		Colgate	W 61–60	15–8 (7–5)	Bender Arena (1,414); Washington, D.C.
February 8, 2023; 7:00 p.m., ESPN+		at Boston University	L 54–60	15–9 (7–6)	Case Gym (775); Boston, MA
February 11, 2023; 2:00 p.m., ESPN+		Holy Cross	L 66–74	15–10 (7–7)	Bender Arena (878); Washington, D.C.
February 13, 2023; 7:00 p.m., CBSSN		at Bucknell	L 51–73	15–11 (7–8)	Sojka Pavilion (1,563); Lewisburg, PA
February 18, 2023; 2:00 p.m., ESPN+		Lehigh	L 59–62	15–12 (7–9)	Bender Arena (684); Washington, D.C.
February 22, 2023; 7:00 p.m., ESPN+		Navy	L 54–70	15–13 (7–10)	Bender Arena (727); Washington, D.C.
February 25, 2023; 5:00 p.m., ESPN+		at Loyola (MD)	L 77–83 ^{OT}	15–14 (7–11)	Reitz Arena (1,312); Baltimore, MD
Patriot League tournament
February 28, 2023; 7:00 p.m., ESPN+	(7)	(10) Bucknell; First round	W 64–59	16–14	Bender Arena (1,019); Washington, D.C.
March 2, 2023; 7:00 p.m., ESPN+	(7)	at (2) Navy; Quarterfinals	W 52–51	17–14	Alumni Hall (986); Annapolis, MD
March 5, 2023; 4:00pm, CBSSN	(7)	at (6) Lafayette; Semifinals	L 76–84 ^{2OT}	17–15	Kirby Sports Center (2,016); Easton, PA
*Non-conference game. ^{#}Rankings from AP poll. (#) Tournament seedings in parentheses. All times are in Eastern.
