= 2022–23 Army Black Knights men's basketball team =

American college basketball season

2022–23 Army Black Knights men's basketball
- Conference: Patriot League
- Record: 17–16 (10–8 Patriot)
- Head coach: Jimmy Allen (7th season)
- Assistant coaches: Nick Thorsen; Doug Novak; Joshua Hayes; Jesse Flannery; Evan Manning
- Home arena: Christl Arena

2022–23 Patriot League men's basketball standings
	Conf.				Overall
Team	W		L	PCT	W		L	PCT
Colgate†	17	–	1	.944	26	–	9	.743
Navy	11	–	7	.611	18	–	13	.581
Lehigh	11	–	7	.611	16	–	14	.533
Army	10	–	8	.556	17	–	16	.515
Boston University	8	–	10	.444	15	–	17	.469
Lafayette	7	–	11	.389	11	–	23	.324
American	7	–	11	.389	17	–	15	.531
Loyola	7	–	11	.389	13	–	20	.394
Holy Cross	7	–	11	.389	10	–	22	.313
Bucknell	5	–	13	.278	12	–	20	.375
† 2023 Patriot League tournament winner

The 2022–23 Army Black Knights men's basketball team represented the United States Military Academy in the 2022–23 NCAA Division I men's basketball season. The Black Knights, led by seventh-year head coach Jimmy Allen, played their home games at Christl Arena in West Point, New York as members of the Patriot League. They finished the season 17–16, 10–8 in Patriot League play to finish in fourth place. They defeated Boston University in the quarterfinals of the Patriot League tournament before losing to Colgate in the semifinals.

On March 10, 2023, the school fired head coach Jimmy Allen. On March 29, the school named Butler assistant coach Kevin Kuwik the team's new head coach.

== Previous season ==
The Black Knights finished the 2021–22 season 15–16, 9–9 in Patriot League play to finish in fifth place. As the No. 5 seed, they lost to No. 4 seed Lehigh in the quarterfinals of the Patriot League tournament.

== Roster ==
2022–23 Army Black Knights men's basketball team
Players
Coaches

Pos.	#	Name	Height	Weight	Year	Previous school	Hometown
G	0	Isaiah Caldwell	6 ft 2 in (1.88 m)	163 lb (74 kg)	So	USMAPS	Columbia, SC
G	1	Jalen Rucker	5 ft 10 in (1.78 m)	180 lb (82 kg)	Jr	Gilman (USMAPS)	Baltimore, MD
G	2	Coleton Benson	6 ft 1 in (1.85 m)	170 lb (77 kg)	Fr	Bowie HS (USMAPS)	Austin, TX
G	3	Jaden Ellis	6 ft 0 in (1.83 m)	170 lb (77 kg)	Fr	Page HS (USMAPS)	Greensboro, NC
F	4	Chris Mann	6 ft 6 in (1.98 m)	205 lb (93 kg)	Sr	Phillipsburg HS (USMAPS)	Phillipsburg, NJ
F	5	Griff Lamb	6 ft 8 in (2.03 m)	205 lb (93 kg)	So	Gilbert HS (USMAPS)	Holbrook, AZ
G	10	Zach Lezanic	6 ft 0 in (1.83 m)	165 lb (75 kg)	Jr	Conestoga HS	Berwyn, PA
G	12	Blane St. Clair	6 ft 5 in (1.96 m)	202 lb (92 kg)	So	Davidson Day School	Boone, NC
F	15	Jorn Everson	6 ft 8 in (2.03 m)	210 lb (95 kg)	Fr	Northfield Mount Hermon School	Williston, ND
G	22	Kwabena Davis	6 ft 3 in (1.91 m)	182 lb (83 kg)	Jr	Byron P. Steele HS (USMAPS)	San Antonio, TX
F	23	Ethan Roberts	6 ft 5 in (1.96 m)	195 lb (88 kg)	Fr	Hersey HS (USMAPS)	Arlington Heights, IL
G	24	Jared Cross	6 ft 3 in (1.91 m)	196 lb (89 kg)	Jr	St. Stephen's & St. Agnes School	Leesburg, VA
F	25	Chanse Perkins	6 ft 4 in (1.93 m)	210 lb (95 kg)	Fr	Woodlands Christian Academy	Houston, TX
G	31	Blake Barker	6 ft 2 in (1.88 m)	200 lb (91 kg)	So	Columbus North HS	Columbus, IN
F	33	JT Dougherty	6 ft 9 in (2.06 m)	205 lb (93 kg)	So	River Falls HS	River Falls, WI
F	34	Charlie Peterson	6 ft 9 in (2.06 m)	223 lb (101 kg)	Jr	North Central HS	Indianapolis, IN
G	35	TJ Small	6 ft 2 in (1.88 m)	188 lb (85 kg)	So	Brother Martin HS (USMAPS)	Kenner, LA
F	41	Nolan Naess	6 ft 8 in (2.03 m)	197 lb (89 kg)	So	Laguna Beach HS	Laguna Beach, CA
G	42	Luke Benson	5 ft 11 in (1.8 m)	170 lb (77 kg)	So	Marist School	Atlanta, GA
G	43	Jackson Mayo	6 ft 0 in (1.83 m)	182 lb (83 kg)	Fr	Mililani HS	Mililani, HI
F	44	Matt Dove	6 ft 10 in (2.08 m)	240 lb (109 kg)	Jr	Princeton Community HS (USMAPS)	Princeton, IN
F	52	Ben Jensen	6 ft 10 in (2.08 m)	200 lb (91 kg)	Sr	W.T. Woodson HS	Fairfax, VA
G	53	Zach Rocco	6 ft 1 in (1.85 m)	180 lb (82 kg)	Jr	Penn-Trafford HS	Export, PA
F	54	Abe Johnson	6 ft 8 in (2.03 m)	225 lb (102 kg)	Jr	Hellgate HS	Missoula, MT
F	55	AJ Allenspach	6 ft 8 in (2.03 m)	225 lb (102 kg)	So	Lake Norman Christian School	Simpsonville, SC

Head coach

- Jimmy Allen (Emory & Henry)

Assistant coach(es)

- Nick Thorsen (Penn State Behrend)
- Doug Novak (Tennessee)
- Joshua Hayes (Methodist)
- Jesse Flannery (Johns Hopkins)
- Evan Manning (Kansas)

Legend

- (C) Team captain
- (S) Suspended
- (I) Ineligible
- (W) Walk-on
- Injured
- Current redshirt

Roster
Last update: November 12, 2022

== Schedule and results ==
Date time, TV	Rank^{#}	Opponent^{#}	Result	Record	Site (attendance) city, state
Non-conference regular season
November 7, 2022*; 7:30 pm, ESPN+		Keystone	W 110–65	1–0	Christl Arena (504); West Point, NY
November 12, 2022*; 1:00 pm, ESPN+		Stonehill	L 77–82	1–1	Christl Arena (677); West Point, NY
November 16, 2022*; 7:00 pm, ESPN+		at Siena	W 96–94 ^{OT}	2–1	MVP Arena (5,123); Albany, NY
November 19, 2022*; 4:00 pm, FloHoops		at William & Mary; William & Mary MTE	L 67–76	2–2	Kaplan Arena (3,170); Williamsburg, VA
November 20, 2022*; 2:00 pm		vs. Radford; William & Mary MTE	L 75–90	2–3	Kaplan Arena (505); Williamsburg, VA
November 24, 2022*; 2:30 pm, YouTube		vs. Princeton; London Basketball Classic	L 66–74	2–4	Copper Box Arena; London, England
November 26, 2022*; 9:30 a.m., YouTube		vs. Manhattan; London Basketball Classic	L 71–72	2–5	Copper Box Arena; London, England
November 30, 2022*; 6:00 pm, ESPN+		Merchant Marine	W 88–57	3–5	Christl Arena (482); West Point, NY
December 3, 2022*; 1:00 pm, ESPN+		Wagner	W 75–64	4–5	Christl Arena (635); West Point, NY
December 7, 2022*; 7:00 pm, ESPN+		NJIT	W 63–62	5–5	Christl Arena (510); West Point, NY
December 10, 2022*; 2:00 pm, ESPN+		at Rhode Island	L 67–77	5–6	Ryan Center (5,283); Kingston, RI
December 18, 2022*; 1:00 pm, FloHoops		at Stony Brook	L 59–66	5–7	Island Federal Arena (1,726); Stony Brook, NY
December 20, 2022*; 7:00 pm, NEC Front Row		at Central Connecticut	W 66–55	6–7	William H. Detrick Gymnasium (584); New Britain, CT
Patriot League regular season
December 30, 2022; 6:00 pm, ESPN+		Lehigh	W 80–78	7–7 (1–0)	Christl Arena (1,231); West Point, NY
January 2, 2023; 7:00 pm, ESPN+		at Lafayette	W 82–65	8–7 (2–0)	Kirby Sports Center (1,574); Easton, PA
January 5, 2023; 7:00 pm, ESPN+		at Loyola (MD)	W 78–55	9–7 (3–0)	Reitz Arena (432); Baltimore, MD
January 9, 2023; 7:00 pm, CBSSN		Colgate	L 75–77	9–8 (3–1)	Christl Arena (573); West Point, NY
January 11, 2023; 6:00 pm, ESPN+		American	W 72–60	10–8 (4–1)	Christl Arena (553); West Point, NY
January 14, 2023; 1:00 pm, ESPN+		at Boston University	W 83–74	11–8 (5–1)	Case Gym (610); Boston, MA
January 18, 2023; 6:00 pm, ESPN+		Bucknell	L 66–68	11–9 (5–2)	Christl Arena (537); West Point, NY
January 21, 2023; 1:30 pm, CBSSN		Navy	L 71–77	11–10 (5–3)	Christl Arena (5,025); West Point, NY
January 25, 2023; 7:00 pm, ESPN+		at American	L 61–63	11–11 (5–4)	Bender Arena (657); Washington, D.C.
January 28, 2023; 1:00 pm, ESPN+		Holy Cross	W 66–55	12–11 (6–4)	Christl Arena (1,001); West Point, NY
February 1, 2023; 7:00 pm, ESPN+		at Lehigh	W 71–69	13–11 (7–4)	Stabler Arena (954); Bethlehem, PA
February 4, 2023; 7:00 pm, ESPN+		at Bucknell	L 67–73	13–12 (7–5)	Sojka Pavilion (1,639); Lewisburg, PA
February 8, 2023; 6:00 pm, ESPN+		Loyola (MD)	W 76–70	14–12 (8–5)	Christl Arena (594); West Point, NY
February 11, 2023; 1:30 pm, CBSSN		at Navy	L 53–70	14–13 (8–6)	Alumni Hall (5,274); Annapolis, MD
February 15, 2023; 7:00 pm, ESPN+		at Colgate	L 86–93	14–14 (8–7)	Cotterell Court (775); Hamilton, NY
February 18, 2023; 1:00 pm, ESPN+		Lafayette	W 53–43	15–14 (9–7)	Christl Arena (1,071); West Point, NY
February 22, 2023; 6:00 pm, ESPN+		Boston University	L 67–73	15–15 (9–8)	Christl Arena (869); West Point, NY
February 25, 2023; 2:00 pm, ESPN+		at Holy Cross	W 80–65	16–15 (10–8)	Hart Center (1,254); Worcester, MA
Patriot League tournament
March 2, 2023; 6:00 pm, ESPN+	(4)	(5) Boston University; Quarterfinals	W 71–69 ^{OT}	17–15	Christl Arena (681); West Point, NY
March 5, 2023; 2:00 pm, CBSSN	(4)	at (1) Colgate; Semifinals	L 74–91	17–16	Cotterell Court (1,327); Hamilton, NY
*Non-conference game. ^{#}Rankings from AP Poll. (#) Tournament seedings in parentheses. All times are in Eastern.
