= 2022–23 Loyola Greyhounds men's basketball team =

American college basketball season

2022–23 Loyola Greyhounds men's basketball
- Conference: Patriot League
- Record: 13–20 (7–11 Patriot)
- Head coach: Tavaras Hardy (5th season)
- Assistant coaches: Taj Finger; JerShon Cobb; Corin 'Tiny' Adams
- Home arena: Reitz Arena

2022–23 Patriot League men's basketball standings
	Conf.				Overall
Team	W		L	PCT	W		L	PCT
Colgate†	17	–	1	.944	26	–	9	.743
Navy	11	–	7	.611	18	–	13	.581
Lehigh	11	–	7	.611	16	–	14	.533
Army	10	–	8	.556	17	–	16	.515
Boston University	8	–	10	.444	15	–	17	.469
Lafayette	7	–	11	.389	11	–	23	.324
American	7	–	11	.389	17	–	15	.531
Loyola	7	–	11	.389	13	–	20	.394
Holy Cross	7	–	11	.389	10	–	22	.313
Bucknell	5	–	13	.278	12	–	20	.375
† 2023 Patriot League tournament winner

The 2022–23 Loyola Greyhounds men's basketball team represented Loyola University Maryland in the 2022–23 NCAA Division I men's basketball season. The Greyhounds, led by fifth-year head coach Tavaras Hardy, played their home games at Reitz Arena in Baltimore, Maryland as members of the Patriot League. They finished the season 13–20, 7–11 in Patriot League play, to finish in a four-way tie for sixth place. As the No. 8 seed in the Patriot League tournament, they defeated Holy Cross in the first round before losing to Colgate in the quarterfinals.

== Previous season ==
The Greyhounds finished the 2021–22 season 14–16, 8–10 in Patriot League play, to finish in sixth place. They were defeated by Boston University in the quarterfinals of the Patriot League tournament.

== Roster ==
2022–23 Loyola Greyhounds men's basketball team
Players
Coaches

Pos.	#	Name	Height	Weight	Year	Previous school	Hometown
G	0	Nick Marshall	6 ft 4 in (1.93 m)	180 lb (82 kg)	So	River Hill	Clarksville, MD
F	1	Veljko Ilic	6 ft 10 in (2.08 m)	230 lb (104 kg)	So	Hoosac School	Gornji Milanovac, Serbia
G	2	Jaylin Andrews	6 ft 4 in (1.93 m)	186 lb (84 kg)	GS	Boys' Latin School of Maryland	Owings Mills, MD
F	4	Alonso Faure	6 ft 10 in (2.08 m)	221 lb (100 kg)	Jr	IES Fuente San Luis	Busot, Spain
F	5	Isaiah Alexander	6 ft 7 in (2.01 m)	190 lb (86 kg)	Fr	Archbishop Stepinac	The Bronx, NY
F	10	Golden Dike	6 ft 10 in (2.08 m)	248 lb (112 kg)	Sr	Colegio SEK El Castillo International School	Málaga, Spain
F	11	Milos Ilic	6 ft 10 in (2.08 m)	230 lb (104 kg)	So	Hoosac School	Gornji Milanovac, Serbia
G	12	Deon Perry	5 ft 8 in (1.73 m)	160 lb (73 kg)	Fr	Our Lady of Mount Carmel	Baltimore, MD
F	13	Markese Redding	6 ft 7 in (2.01 m)	210 lb (95 kg)	GS	LREI	Brooklyn, NY
G	14	Garrett Brennan	6 ft 4 in (1.93 m)	190 lb (86 kg)	Fr	St. Stephen's & St. Agnes	Reston, VA
G	15	Tyson Commander	6 ft 4 in (1.93 m)	185 lb (84 kg)	Fr	John Carroll School	Belcamp, MD
G	20	Chris Kuzemka	6 ft 0 in (1.83 m)	175 lb (79 kg)	So	Centreville	Clifton, VA
G	21	Charlie Weisberg	6 ft 3 in (1.91 m)	185 lb (84 kg)	So	The Millbrook School	Brooklyn, NY
G	22	Samuel Gibbs	6 ft 3 in (1.91 m)	190 lb (86 kg)	Fr	Archbishop Stepinac	Rye, NY
G	23	David III Brown	6 ft 5 in (1.96 m)	215 lb (98 kg)	So	Bishop McNamara	La Plata, MD
G	24	Daraun Gray	6 ft 0 in (1.83 m)	177 lb (80 kg)	Sr	Landon School	Clarksburg, MD
G	25	Kenneth Jones	6 ft 0 in (1.83 m)	175 lb (79 kg)	GS	Mater Dei Prep	Hillside, NJ
G	55	Alex Jackson	5 ft 7 in (1.7 m)	165 lb (75 kg)	Sr	Boys' Latin School of Maryland	Baltimore, MD

Head coach

- Tavaras Hardy (Northwestern)

Assistant coach(es)

- Taj Finger (Stanford)
- JerShon Cobb (Northwestern)
- Corin 'Tiny' Adams (Morgan State)

Legend

- (C) Team captain
- (S) Suspended
- (I) Ineligible
- (W) Walk-on
- Injured
- Current redshirt

Roster
Last update: December 1, 2022

== Schedule and results ==
Date time, TV	Rank^{#}	Opponent^{#}	Result	Record	Site (attendance) city, state
Exhibition
November 1, 2022*; 7:00 p.m., ESPN+		Stevenson	W 75–38	–	Reitz Arena (214); Baltimore, MD
Non-conference regular season
November 7, 2022*; 6:45 p.m., FS1		at DePaul	L 66–72	0–1	Wintrust Arena (2,973); Chicago, IL
November 10, 2022*; 7:00 p.m., BTN+		at Penn State	L 65–90	0–2	Bryce Jordan Center (6,444); University Park, PA
November 13, 2022*; 5:00 p.m., ESPN+		Brown	W 75–70	1–2	Reitz Arena (1,079); Baltimore, MD
November 17, 2022*; 7:00 p.m., ESPN+		Washington (MD)	W 81–53	2–2	Reitz Arena (421); Baltimore, MD
November 21, 2022*; 7:00 p.m., ACCNX/ESPN+		at Clemson; Emerald Coast Classic campus-site game	L 41–72	2–3	Littlejohn Coliseum (4,655); Clemson, SC
November 25, 2022*; 12:00 p.m., FloHoops		vs. Southern; Emerald Coast Classic second round	L 58–76	2–4	The Arena at NFSC (125); Niceville, FL
November 26, 2022*; 11:00 a.m., FloHoops		vs. Louisiana–Monroe; Emerald Coast Classic consolation	W 65–64	3–4	The Arena at NFSC (100); Niceville, FL
November 30, 2022*; 6:00 p.m., ESPN+		at Binghamton	W 84–70	4–4	Binghamton University Events Center (1,252); Vestal, NY
December 3, 2022*; 5:00 p.m., ESPN+		Coppin State	L 71–74	4–5	Reitz Arena (807); Baltimore, MD
December 7, 2022*; 7:00 p.m., FloHoops		at Hampton	L 61–66	4–6	Hampton Convocation Center (263); Hampton, VA
December 10, 2022*; 7:00 p.m., ESPN+		at Mount St. Mary's	L 34–51	4–7	Knott Arena (2,002); Emmitsburg, MD
December 13, 2022*; 7:00 p.m., ESPN+		UMBC	L 69–72	4–8	Reitz Arena (804); Baltimore, MD
December 22, 2022*; 7:00 p.m., ESPN+		Goucher	W 99–53	5–8	Reitz Arena (342); Baltimore, MD
Patriot League regular season
December 30, 2022; 7:00 p.m., ESPN+		Colgate	L 67–101	5–9 (0–1)	Reitz Arena (706); Baltimore, MD
January 2, 2023; 2:00 p.m., ESPN+		at American	L 55–71	5–10 (0–2)	Bender Arena (670); Washington, D.C.
January 5, 2023; 7:00 p.m., ESPN+		Army	L 55–78	5–11 (0–3)	Reitz Arena (432); Baltimore, MD
January 8, 2023; 12:00 p.m., ESPN+		at Holy Cross	L 55–63	5–12 (0–4)	Hart Center (717); Worcester, MA
January 11, 2023; 7:00 p.m., ESPN+		at Bucknell	W 67–57	6–12 (1–4)	Sojka Pavilion (846); Lewisburg, PA
January 14, 2023; 5:00 p.m., ESPN+		Navy	W 69–67	7–12 (2–4)	Reitz Arena (824); Baltimore, MD
January 16, 2023; 7:00 p.m., CBSSN		Lehigh	L 70–74	7–13 (2–5)	Reitz Arena (1,124); Baltimore, MD
January 21, 2023; 1:00 p.m., ESPN+		at Boston University	L 53–66	7–14 (2–6)	Case Gym (785); Boston, MA
January 25, 2023; 7:00 p.m., ESPN+		at Lafayette	L 46–62	7–15 (2–7)	Kirby Sports Center (1,687); Easton, PA
January 28, 2023; 1:00 p.m., ESPN+		Bucknell	W 80–66	8–15 (3–7)	Reitz Arena (1,042); Baltimore, MD
January 30, 2023; 7:00 p.m., CBSSN		at Colgate	L 63–76	8–16 (3–8)	Cotterell Court (867); Hamilton, NY
February 4, 2023; 5:00 p.m., ESPN+		Boston University	L 67–68	8–17 (3–9)	Reitz Arena (873); Baltimore, MD
February 8, 2023; 6:00 p.m., ESPN+		at Army	L 70–76	8–18 (3–10)	Christl Arena (594); West Point, NY
February 11, 2023; 7:00 p.m., ESPN+		at Lehigh	W 91–82	9–18 (4–10)	Stabler Arena (1,351); Bethlehem, PA
February 15, 2023; 7:00 p.m., ESPN+		Lafayette	W 73–70	10–18 (5–10)	Reitz Arena (624); Baltimore, MD
February 18, 2023; 4:00 p.m., ESPN+		at Navy	L 53–65	10–19 (5–11)	Alumni Hall (2,323); Annapolis, MD
February 22, 2023; 7:00 p.m., ESPN+		Holy Cross	W 90–68	11–19 (6–11)	Reitz Arena (589); Baltimore, MD
February 25, 2023; 5:00 p.m., ESPN+		American	W 83–77 ^{OT}	12–19 (7–11)	Reitz Arena (1,312); Baltimore, MD
Patriot League tournament
February 28, 2023; 7:00 p.m., ESPN+	(8)	(9) Holy Cross; First round	W 73–69	13–19	Reitz Arena (1,047); Baltimore, MD
March 2, 2023; 7:00 p.m., ESPN+	(8)	at (1) Colgate; Quarterfinals	L 73–92	13–20	Cotterell Court (1,279); Hamilton, NY
*Non-conference game. ^{#}Rankings from AP poll. (#) Tournament seedings in parentheses. All times are in Eastern.
