= 2022–23 Bucknell Bison men's basketball team =

American college basketball season

2022–23 Bucknell Bison men's basketball
- Conference: Patriot League
- Record: 12–20 (5–13 Patriot)
- Head coach: Nathan Davis (8th season)
- Associate head coach: Paul Harrison
- Assistant coaches: Branden McDonald; Lamont Moore
- Home arena: Sojka Pavilion

2022–23 Patriot League men's basketball standings
	Conf.				Overall
Team	W		L	PCT	W		L	PCT
Colgate†	17	–	1	.944	26	–	9	.743
Navy	11	–	7	.611	18	–	13	.581
Lehigh	11	–	7	.611	16	–	14	.533
Army	10	–	8	.556	17	–	16	.515
Boston University	8	–	10	.444	15	–	17	.469
Lafayette	7	–	11	.389	11	–	23	.324
American	7	–	11	.389	17	–	15	.531
Loyola	7	–	11	.389	13	–	20	.394
Holy Cross	7	–	11	.389	10	–	22	.313
Bucknell	5	–	13	.278	12	–	20	.375
† 2023 Patriot League tournament winner

The 2022–23 Bucknell Bison Men's Basketball Team represented Bucknell University in the 2022–23 NCAA Division I men's basketball season. The Bison, led by eighth-year head coach Nathan Davis, played their home games at Sojka Pavilion in Lewisburg, Pennsylvania as members of the Patriot League. They finished the season 12–20, 5–13 in Patriot League play to finish in last place. They lost to American in the first round of the Patriot League tournament.

On March 3, 2023, the school fired head coach, Nathan Davis. On March 21, the school named former Bucknell player and Saint Joseph's assistant coach John Griffin III the team's new head coach.

== Previous season ==
The Bison finished the 2021–22 season 9–23, 5–13 in Patriot League play to finish tied for last place. As the 9 seed, they defeated 8 seed Lafayette in overtime in the first round of the Patriot League Tournament, before falling to top-seeded Colgate in the quarterfinals.

== Roster ==
2022–23 Bucknell Bison men's basketball team
Players
Coaches

Pos.	#	Name	Height	Weight	Year	Hometown
F	1	Ian Motta	6 ft 6 in (1.98 m)	198 lb (90 kg)	So	Allen, Texas
G	2	Brady Muller	6 ft 4 in (1.93 m)	209 lb (95 kg)	Fr	Wyckoff, New Jersey
C	3	Noah Williamson	7 ft 0 in (2.13 m)	244 lb (111 kg)	Fr	Riga, Latvia
G	4	Josh Fulton	6 ft 6 in (1.98 m)	186 lb (84 kg)	Fr	Atlanta, Georgia
G	5	Elvin Edmonds IV	6 ft 2 in (1.88 m)	201 lb (91 kg)	So	Hopewell, Virginia
G	11	Josh Adoh	6 ft 4 in (1.93 m)	205 lb (93 kg)	Jr	Bellflower, California
G	13	Josh Bascoe	6 ft 0 in (1.83 m)	178 lb (81 kg)	So	Milton, Ontario
G	21	Xander Rice	6 ft 3 in (1.91 m)	192 lb (87 kg)	Sr	West Long Branch, New Jersey
F	22	Ruot Bijiek	6 ft 9 in (2.06 m)	187 lb (85 kg)	Fr	Waukee, Iowa
C	23	Andre Screen	7 ft 1 in (2.16 m)	261 lb (118 kg)	Jr	Alexandria, Virginia
G	24	Jack Forrest	6 ft 5 in (1.96 m)	208 lb (94 kg)	Jr	Lower Merion, Pennsylvania
G	25	Alek Delev	6 ft 0 in (1.83 m)	152 lb (69 kg)	Jr	Sofia, Bulgaria
F	32	Jake van der Heijden	6 ft 9 in (2.06 m)	233 lb (106 kg)	Sr	Raleigh, North Carolina
C	40	Alex Timmerman	6 ft 10 in (2.08 m)	277 lb (126 kg)	Sr	Crystal Lake, Illinois

Head coach

- Nathan Davis (Randolph–Macon)

Assistant coach(es)

- Paul Harrison (Washington and Lee)
- Branden McDonald (Virginia Union)
- Lamont Moore (Randolph–Macon)

Legend

- (C) Team captain
- (S) Suspended
- (I) Ineligible
- (W) Walk-on
- Injured
- Current redshirt

Roster
Last update: October 31, 2022

== Schedule and results ==
Date time, TV	Rank^{#}	Opponent^{#}	Result	Record	Site (attendance) city, state
Non-conference regular season
November 7, 2022*; 7:00 pm, ESPN+		Lebanon Valley	W 113–52	1–0	Sojka Pavilion (1,412); Lewisburg, PA
November 12, 2022*; 4:00 pm, ESPN+		Niagara	W 68–50	2–0	Sojka Pavilion (1,264); Lewisburg, PA
November 15, 2022*; 7:00 pm, ESPN+		at Saint Peter's	L 71–82	2–1	Run Baby Run Arena (612); Jersey City, NJ
November 18, 2022*; 7:00 pm, SECN		at Georgia; Sunshine Slam campus-site game	L 61–65	2–2	Stegeman Coliseum; Athens, GA
November 21, 2022*; 2:00 pm, FloHoops		vs. Presbyterian; Sunshine Slam Semifinals	W 66–65	3–2	Ocean Center; Daytona Beach, FL
November 22, 2022*; 12:00 pm, FloHoops		vs. Austin Peay; Sunshine Slam Championship	W 79–65	4–2	Ocean Center; Daytona Beach, FL
November 26, 2022*; 2:00 pm, ESPN+		Marist	L 54–60 ^{OT}	4–3	Sojka Pavilion (747); Lewisburg, PA
November 30, 2022*; 7:00 pm, ESPN+		Saint Francis (PA)	W 89–65	5–3	Sojka Pavilion (847); Lewisburg, PA
December 3, 2022*; 2:00 pm, ESPN3		at NJIT	W 79–63	6–3	Wellness and Events Center (299); Newark, NJ
December 6, 2022*; 7:00 pm, ESPN+		at La Salle	L 72–82	6–4	Tom Gola Arena (1,362); Philadelphia, PA
December 18, 2022*; 2:00 pm, ESPN+		Merrimack	W 61–55	7–4	Sojka Pavilion (948); Lewisburg, PA
December 21, 2022*; 7:00 pm, ESPN+/NBCSWA		at Richmond	L 71–81	7–5	Robins Center (5,803); Richmond, VA
December 23, 2022*; 5:00 pm, BTN		at Rutgers	L 50–85	7–6	Jersey Mike's Arena (6,000); Piscataway, NJ
Patriot League regular season
December 30, 2022; 2:00 pm, ESPN+		at Holy Cross	L 58–60	7–7 (0–1)	Hart Center (1,424); Worcester, MA
January 2, 2023; 2:00 pm, ESPN+		Boston University	L 61–69	7–8 (0–2)	Sojka Pavilion (1,001); Lewisburg, PA
January 5, 2023; 7:00 pm, ESPN+		Lehigh	L 64–72	7–9 (0–3)	Sojka Pavilion (747); Lewisburg, PA
January 8, 2023; 1:00 pm, ESPN+		at Lafayette	L 67–74 ^{OT}	7–10 (0–4)	Kirby Sports Center (1,696); Easton, PA
January 11, 2023; 7:00 pm, ESPN+		Loyola (MD)	L 57–67	7–11 (0–5)	Sojka Pavilion (846); Lewisburg, PA
January 14, 2023; 2:00 pm, ESPN+		at Colgate	L 65–71	7–12 (0–6)	Cotterell Court (785); Hamilton, NY
January 18, 2023; 6:00 pm, ESPN+		at Army	W 68–66	8–12 (1–6)	Christl Arena (537); West Point, NY
January 21, 2023; 2:00 pm, ESPN+		Holy Cross	L 73–80	8–13 (1–7)	Sojka Pavilion (1,219); Lewisburg, PA
January 25, 2023; 7:00 pm, ESPN+		Navy	L 46–63	8–14 (1–8)	Sojka Pavilion (828); Lewisburg, PA
January 28, 2023; 1:00 pm, ESPN+		at Loyola (MD)	L 66–80	8–15 (1–9)	Reitz Arena (1,042); Baltimore, MD
February 1, 2023; 7:00 pm, ESPN+		at American	W 78–71	9–15 (2–9)	Bender Arena (632); Washington, D.C.
February 4, 2023; 7:00 pm, ESPN+		Army	W 73–67	10–15 (3–9)	Sojka Pavilion (1,639); Lewisburg, PA
February 8, 2023; 7:00 pm, ESPN+		at Navy	L 65–71	10–16 (3–10)	Alumni Hall (1,207); Annapolis, MD
February 11, 2023; 12:00 pm, ESPN+		Colgate	L 56–76	10–17 (3–11)	Sojka Pavilion (1,829); Lewisburg, PA
February 13, 2023; 7:00 pm, CBSSN		American	W 73–51	11–17 (4–11)	Sojka Pavilion (1,563); Lewisburg, PA
February 18, 2023; 1:00 pm, ESPN+		at Boston University	L 61–77	11–18 (4–12)	Case Gym (788); Boston, MA
February 22, 2023; 7:00 pm, ESPN+		at Lehigh	L 62–78	11–19 (4–13)	Stabler Arena (908); Bethlehem, PA
February 25, 2023; 2:00 pm, ESPN+		Lafayette	W 75–65	12–19 (5–13)	Sojka Pavilion (1,562); Lewisburg, PA
Patriot League tournament
February 28, 2023; 7:00 pm, ESPN+	(10)	at (7) American; First round	L 59–64	12–20	Bender Arena (1,019); Washington, D.C.
*Non-conference game. ^{#}Rankings from AP Poll. (#) Tournament seedings in parentheses. All times are in Eastern.
