= Trey Montgomery =

German basketball head coach

Colgate Raiders
- Title: Assistant coach
- League: Patriot League

Personal information
- Born: January 26, 1987 (age 39) Destrehan, Louisiana, U.S.
- Listed height: 6 ft 4 in (1.93 m)

Career information
- College: Samford (2006–2010)
- NBA draft: 2012: undrafted
- Playing career: 2012–2014
- Position: Guard
- Number: 11
- Coaching career: 2016–present

Career history

Playing
- 2012–2014: Jackson Showboats

Coaching
- 2016–2018: Eastern (assistant)
- 2018–2022: Penn (assistant)
- 2022–present: Colgate (assistant)

Trey Montgomery (born January 26, 1987) is an American basketball coach who is currently an assistant coach at Colgate University under head coach Matt Langel.

== Coaching career ==
=== Penn (2018-2022) ===
On September 5, 2018, Penn Quakers' head coach, Steve Donahue, announced that there will be a reshuffling of the coaching staff. He heralded that Montgomery would be in his new staff. Montgomery, previously, was an assistant coach for the Eastern University Eagles. He described his tenure at Philadelphia as a "leap of faith" since there are more opportunities in the area than in Louisiana. Since he was the neophyte and youngest in the coaching rotation, he was assigned the responsibility of training the players as well as checking up on their academic progress.

=== Colgate (2022-present) ===
Montgomery has been an assistant for the Colgate Raiders in the Patriot League since 2022.
