= Bryant Bulldogs men's basketball statistical leaders =

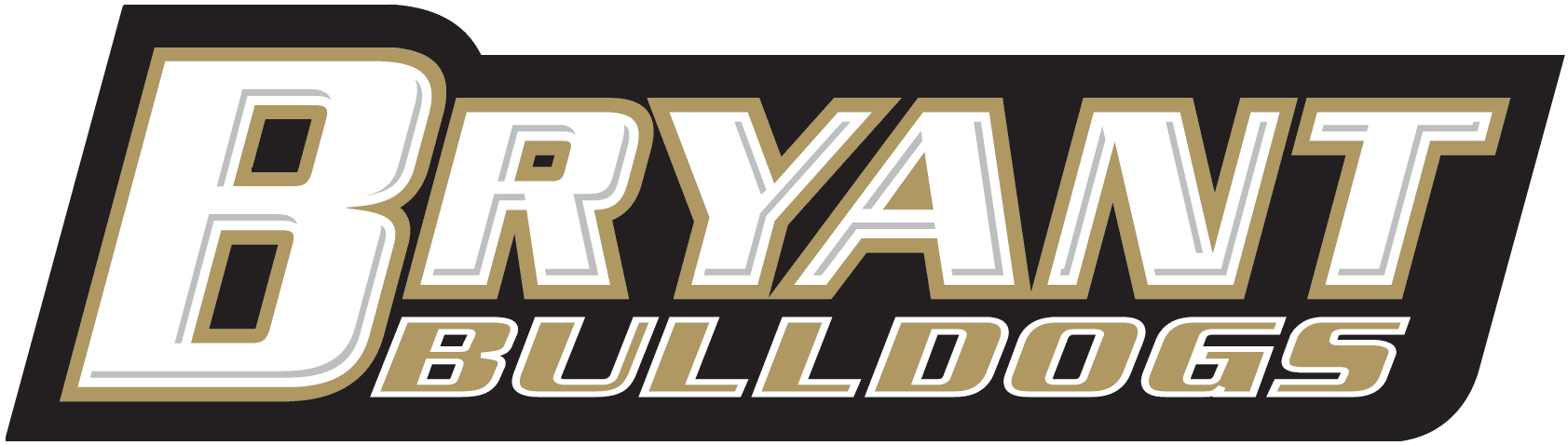

The Bryant Bulldogs men's basketball statistical leaders are individual statistical leaders of the Bryant Bulldogs men's basketball program in various categories, including points, rebounds, assists, steals, and blocks. Within those areas, the lists identify single-game, single-season, and career leaders. As of the next NCAA basketball season in 2022–23, the Bulldogs represent Bryant University in the NCAA Division I America East Conference.

Bryant began competing in intercollegiate basketball in 1963. The NCAA has recorded scoring statistics throughout the "modern era" of basketball, which it defines as starting with the 1937–38 season, the first after the center jump after each made basket was abolished. Rebounding and assists were added in the 1950–51 season. While rebounding has been recorded in each subsequent season, the NCAA stopped recording assists after the 1951–52 season, and did not reinstate assists as an official statistic until 1983–84. Blocks and steals were added in 1985–86. Bryant's record book includes all seasons, whether or not the NCAA officially recorded those statistics in the relevant seasons. These lists are updated through the end of the 2020–21 season.

== Scoring ==
Career
Rk	Player	Points	Seasons
1	Tom Smile	2390	1963–64 1964–65 1965–66 1966–67
2	Ernie DeWitt	2239	1977–78 1978–79 1979–80 1980–81
3	Alex Francis	2085	2010–11 2011–12 2012–13 2013–14
4	Adam Grant	1837	2016–17 2017–18 2018–19 2019–20
5	John Williams	1754	2002–03 2003–04 2004–05 2005–06
6	Paul Berlo	1715	1979–80 1980–81 1981–82 1982–83
7	Dyami Starks	1691	2012–13 2013–14 2014–15
8	Gregg Cooper	1651	1982–83 1983–84 1984–85 1985–86
9	Dave Sorafine	1589	1972–73 1973–74 1974–75 1975–76
10	Noel Watson	1554	1993–94 1994–95 1995–96 1996–97

Season
Rk	Player	Points	Season
1	Tom Smile	802	1965–66
2	Dave Sorafine	711	1973–74
3	John Williams	682	2004–05
4	Peter Kiss	680	2021–22
5	David Burrows	646	1993–94
6	Dave Sorafine	637	1975–76
7	Ernie DeWitt	633	1980–81
8	Tom Smile	629	1966–67
9	Nisre Zouzoua	628	2016–17
	John Williams	628	2005–06

Single game
Rk	Player	Points	Season	Opponent
1	Dave Sorafine	53	1975–76	St. Francis (Maine)
2	Tom Smile	52	1965–66	Sacred Heart
3	Tom Smile	51	1965–66	Curry
4	Tom Smile	48	1965–66	Sacred Heart
	Tom Smile	48	1964–65	Barrington
6	Dave Sorafine	47	1974–75	Nichols
	Tom Smile	47	1966–67	UMaine-Portland
	Dave Barber	47	1963–64	Nichols
9	Dave Sorafine	45	1973–74	St. Francis (Maine)
	Dave Sorafine	45	1973–74	Southeastern Mass.

== Rebounds ==
Career
Rk	Player	Rebounds	Seasons
1	Alex Francis	990	2010–11 2011–12 2012–13 2013–14
2	Mike Williams	987	2000–01 2001–02 2002–03 2003–04 2004–05
3	Jason Noel	868	2000–01 2001–02 2002–03 2003–04
4	Derek Higgs	828	1985–86 1986–87 1987–88 1988–89
5	Dave Sorafine	805	1972–73 1973–74 1974–75 1975–76
6	Earl Timberlake	773	2022–23 2023–24 2024–25
7	Charles Pride	750	2019–20 2020–21 2021–22 2022–23
8	Dan Garvin	710	2013–14 2014–15 2015–16 2016–17
9	Dan Hammond	643	2002–03 2004–05 2005–06 2006–07
10	Noel Watson	633	1993–94 1994–95 1995–96 1996–97

Season
Rk	Player	Rebounds	Season
1	Ben Billie	386	1967–68
2	Dave Sorafine	352	1973–74
3	Dave Sorafine	336	1975–76
4	Ernie DeWitt	319	1980–81
5	Tommy Box	293	1976–77
6	Derek Higgs	282	1987–88
7	Patrick Harding	280	2019–20
8	Charles Pride	275	2021–22
9	Earl Timberlake	270	2023–24
10	Mike Williams	269	2004–05

Single game
Rk	Player	Rebounds	Season	Opponent
1	Ben Billie	25	1967–68	
2	Keith Miller	23	1997–98	American International
3	Jason Noel	21	2003–04	American International
	Dave Sorafine	21	1975–76	Southeastern Mass
	Bob Chuprevich	21	1968–69	Nichols
6	Derek Higgs	20	1986–87	American International
	Dave Sorafine	20	1973–74	Nasson
	Charlie Armstrong	20	1973–74	Gordon
	Dave Sorafine	20	1973–74	Nichols
10	Patrick Harding	19	2019–20	Cornell
	Mike Williams	19	2002–03	UMass Lowell
	Dave Sorafine	19	1973–74	Roger Williams

== Assists ==
Career
Rk	Player	Assists	Seasons
1	Ned Bohan	621	1971–72 1972–73 1973–74 1974–75
2	Frankie Dobbs	456	2010–11 2011–12 2012–13
3	Shane McLaughlin	436	2012–13 2013–14 2014–15 2015–16
4	Herman Thomas	414	1993–94 1994–95 1995–96 1996–97
5	Manny Barrows	396	1983–84 1984–85 1985–86 1986–87
6	Corey Maynard	379	2010–11 2011–12 2012–13 2013–14
7	Colin Lawson	371	1990–91 1991–92 1992–93 1993–94
8	John Williams	362	2002–03 2003–04 2004–05 2005–06
9	Ikenna Ndugba	358	2016–17 2017–18 2018–19 2019–20
10	Earl Timberlake	349	2022–23 2023–24 2024–25

Season
Rk	Player	Assists	Season
1	Ned Bohan	319	1974–75
2	Ned Bohan	302	1973–74
3	Manny Barrows	177	1984–85
4	Shane McLaughlin	165	2015–16
5	Manny Barrows	162	1985–86
6	Frankie Dobbs	160	2010–11
7	Frankie Dobbs	158	2012–13
8	Earl Timberlake	155	2024–25
9	Shane McLaughlin	148	2014–15
10	Ikenna Ndugba	144	2017–18

Single game
Rk	Player	Assists	Season	Opponent
1	Ned Bohan	21	1974–75	Clark
2	Ned Bohan	19	1974–75	Babson
	Ned Bohan	19	1974–75	Gordon
4	Ned Bohan	18	1974–75	Nasson
	Ned Bohan	18	1973–74	Bentley
	Ned Bohan	18	1973–74	Southeastern Mass.
	Ned Bohan	18	1973–74	Rhode Island College
8	Ned Bohan	16	1974–75	Nasson
	Ned Bohan	16	1974–75	Southeastern Mass.
	Ned Bohan	16	1973–74	New Haven
	Ned Bohan	16	1973–74	Barrington

== Steals ==
Career
Rk	Player	Steals	Seasons
1	Dan Hammond	234	2002–03 2004–05 2005–06 2006–07
2	Ned Bohan	194	1971–72 1972–73 1973–74 1974–75
3	Jerome Grier	188	1992–93 1993–94 1994–95 1995–96
4	John Williams	168	2002–03 2003–04 2004–05 2005–06
5	Chris Birrell	161	2007–08 2008–09 2009–10
6	Jon Wallace	160	1999–00 2000–01 2001–02 2002–03
7	Colin Lawson	156	1990–91 1991–92 1992–93 1993–94
8	Noel Watson	148	1993–94 1994–95 1995–96 1996–97
9	Charles Pride	144	2019–20 2020–21 2021–22 2022–23
10	Ikenna Ndugba	140	2016–17 2017–18 2018–19 2019–20

Season
Rk	Player	Steals	Season
1	Ned Bohan	109	1974–75
2	Ned Bohan	85	1973–74
3	Dan Hammond	72	2004–05
4	John Williams	63	2004–05
5	Chris Birrell	62	2007–08
6	Ikenna Ndugba	61	2017–18
7	Dan Hammond	58	2006–07
8	Mario Correia	57	2004–05
	Jerome Grier	57	1993–94
	Connor Withers	57	2024–25

Single game
Rk	Player	Steals	Season	Opponent
1	Ned Bohan	12	1974–75	Nasson
2	Ned Bohan	10	1974–75	Barrington
3	Dan Hammond	9	2004–05	Merrimack
	Ned Bohan	9	1974–75	Nasson
5	Ikenna Ndugba	8	2017–18	Fairleigh Dickinson
6	Frankie Dobbs	7	2012–13	Sacred Heart
	Nathaniel Sudlow	7	2006–07	Assumption
	Paul Seymour	7	1975–76	Barrington
	Ned Bohan	7	1974–75	Southeastern Mass.

== Blocks ==
Career
Rk	Player	Blocks	Seasons
1	Mike Williams	301	2000–01 2001–02 2002–03 2003–04 2004–05
2	Hall Elisias	209	2019–20 2020–21 2021–22
3	Fred Wande	151	1995–96 1996–97 1997–98 1998–99
4	Dan Garvin	148	2013–14 2014–15 2015–16 2016–17
5	Earl Timberlake	115	2022–23 2023–24 2024–25
6	Steven Wiacek	109	1993–94 1994–95 1995–96 1996–97
7	Dave Sorafine	103	1972–73 1973–74 1974–75 1975–76
8	Connor Withers	98	2023–24 2024–25
9	Jason Noel	95	2000–01 2001–02 2002–03 2003–04
10	Dan Hammond	79	2002–03 2004–05 2005–06 2006–07

Season
Rk	Player	Blocks	Season
1	Dave Sorafine	93	1973–74
2	Mike Williams	90	2002–03
3	Mike Williams	80	2004–05
4	Hall Elisias	78	2019–20
5	Hall Elisias	75	2021–22
6	Daniel Rivera	73	2023–24
7	Mike Williams	70	2000–01
8	Earl Timberlake	59	2024–25
9	Hall Elisias	56	2020–21
10	Mike Williams	55	2003–04

Single game
Rk	Player	Blocks	Season	Opponent
1	Mike Williams	11	2002–03	Le Moyne
2	Papa Lo	9	2009–10	Long Island
3	Hall Elisias	8	2021–22	Wagner
	Hall Elisias	8	2019–20	Navy
	Mike Williams	8	2000–01	Merrimack
6	Hall Elisias	7	2020–21	Wagner
	Papa Lo	7	2009–10	Central Connecticut
	Mike Williams	7	2004–05	Adelphi
	Dave Sorafine	7	1973–74	Suffolk
