= Juozapaitis =

Juozapaitis is a surname. Notable people with this surname include:

- Gedi Juozapaitis (born 1998), Lithuanian-British basketball player
- Leonas Juozapaitis (1901-1980), Lithuanian footballer
- Vytautas Juozapaitis (born 1963), Lithuanian singer
