= 2022–23 Maine Black Bears men's basketball team =

American college basketball season

2022–23 Maine Black Bears men's basketball
- Conference: America East Conference
- Record: 13–17 (7–9 America East)
- Head coach: Chris Markwood (1st season)
- Assistant coaches: Rob O'Driscoll; Pete Gash; Jordon Bronner
- Home arena: Cross Insurance Center

2022–23 America East Conference men's basketball standings
	Conf.				Overall
Team	W		L	PCT	W		L	PCT
Vermont †	14	–	2	.875	23	–	11	.676
UMass Lowell	11	–	5	.688	26	–	8	.765
New Hampshire	9	–	7	.563	15	–	15	.500
UMBC	8	–	8	.500	18	–	14	.563
Binghamton	8	–	8	.500	13	–	18	.419
Bryant	8	–	8	.500	17	–	13	.567
Maine	7	–	9	.438	13	–	17	.433
NJIT	4	–	12	.250	7	–	23	.233
Albany	3	–	13	.188	8	–	23	.258
† 2023 AmEast Tournament winner

The 2022–23 Maine Black Bears men's basketball team represented the University of Maine in the 2022–23 NCAA Division I men's basketball season. The Black Bears, led by first-year head coach Chris Markwood, played their home games at Cross Insurance Center in Bangor, Maine, with some games at Memorial Gymnasium in Orono, Maine, as members of the America East Conference. They finished the season 13-17, 7-9 in America East Play to finish in 7th place. They lost in the quarterfinals of the America East Tournament to UMass Lowell.

== Previous season ==
The Black Bears finished the 2021–22 season 6–23, 3–15 in America East play to finish in last place. As a result, they failed to qualify for the America East Tournament.

On February 17, head coach Richard Barron was dismissed as the Black Bears' head coach, with assistant coach Jai Steadman serving as the interim head coach for the remainder of the season. On March 21, the school announced that alumnus and former Maine assistant coach Chris Markwood was named the school's new head coach.

== Guarantee games ==
Prior to the season, Maine scheduled 5 "guarantee games" with a power conference school. In these games, the home team pay the road team a set amount of money. Maine will receive a total of $365,000 for these five games (Nebraska, Boston College, Marist, Akron, and Ohio State).

== Roster ==
2022–23 Maine Black Bears men's basketball team
Players
Coaches

Pos.	#	Name	Height	Weight	Year	Previous school	Hometown
G	0	Byron Ireland	6 ft 1 in (1.85 m)	—	So	St. Frances Academy	Annapolis, MD
G	1	Kellen Tynes	6 ft 3 in (1.91 m)	175 lb (79 kg)	So	Montana State	Dartmouth, NS
G	2	Ja'Shonté Wright-McLeish	6 ft 4 in (1.93 m)	185 lb (84 kg)	Sr	Collège Jean-de-Brébeuf	Montreal, CAN
G	3	Jaden Clayton	6 ft 1 in (1.85 m)	—	Fr	Fort Erie International Academy	Whitby, ON
F	4	Ata Turgut	6 ft 9 in (2.06 m)	220 lb (100 kg)	RS Jr	TED Ankara Kolejliler	Ankara, Turkey
G	5	Adefolarin Adetogun	6 ft 1 in (1.85 m)	195 lb (88 kg)	Jr	Athol Murray College of Notre Dame	Regina, SK
F	10	John Shea	6 ft 6 in (1.98 m)	—	Fr	Edward Little HS	Auburn, ME
F	11	Kristians Feierbergs	6 ft 8 in (2.03 m)	—	So	GBA Academy	Riga, Latvia
F	12	Milos Nenadic	6 ft 10 in (2.08 m)	—	So	Western Reserve Academy	Kitchener, ON
G	13	LeChaun DuHart	5 ft 10 in (1.78 m)	175 lb (79 kg)	Sr	Western Wyoming	Aurora, CO
F	21	Keelan Steele	6 ft 10 in (2.08 m)	—	Fr	Victory Academy (ON)	Alton, ON
G	22	Gedi Juozapaitis	6 ft 4 in (1.93 m)	210 lb (95 kg)	Sr	Georgia Southern	London, England
G	23	Owen Maloney	6 ft 4 in (1.93 m)	—	Fr	South Portland HS	South Portland, ME
F	30	Ayme Daguilh	6 ft 5 in (1.96 m)	—	Fr	Bridgton Academy	West Boylston, MA
G	31	Novak Perovic	6 ft 7 in (2.01 m)	—	So	Hoosac School	Belgrade, Serbia
F	35	Antonio Lisenbee	6 ft 7 in (2.01 m)	—	Fr	Arsenal Technical HS	Indianapolis, IN
F	44	Peter Filipovity	6 ft 7 in (2.01 m)	—	So	Utah State Eastern	Kaposvár, Hungary

Head coach

- Chris Markwood (Maine)

Assistant coach(es)

- Rob O'Driscoll (Villanova)
- Pete Gash (Chattanooga)
- Jordon Bronner (New Hampshire)

Legend

- (C) Team captain
- (S) Suspended
- (I) Ineligible
- (W) Walk-on
- Injured
- Current redshirt

Roster
Last update: November 9, 2022

== Schedule and results ==
Date time, TV	Rank^{#}	Opponent^{#}	Result	Record	Site (attendance) city, state
Non-conference regular season
November 7, 2022*; 8:00 pm		at Nebraska	L 66–79	0–1	Pinnacle Bank Arena (12,875); Lincoln, NE
November 11, 2022*; 7:00 pm, ESPN3		UMaine Fort Kent	W 90–45	1–1	Cross Insurance Center (729); Bangor, ME
November 14, 2022*; 7:00 pm, ACCN		at Boston College	W 69–64	2–1	Conte Forum (3,811); Chestnut Hill, MA
November 18, 2022*; 7:00 pm, ESPN3		Columbia	W 93–70	3–1	Memorial Gymnasium (889); Orono, ME
November 23, 2022*; 3:30 pm		at Central Connecticut	W 66–58	4–1	William H. Detrick Gymnasium (1,011); New Britain, CT
November 27, 2022*; 2:00 pm, ESPN+		at Brown	L 63–70	4–2	Pizzitola Sports Center (490); Providence, RI
November 30, 2022*; 7:30 pm, ESPN+		at Fordham	L 67–72	4–3	Rose Hill Gymnasium; Bronx, NY
December 4, 2022*; 10:30 am, ESPNU		vs. Marist; Basketball Hall of Fame London Showcase	L 61–62	4–4	The O_{2} Arena; London, United Kingdom
December 8, 2022*; 4:30 pm, ESPN+		UMaine Augusta	W 103–67	5–4	Memorial Gymnasium (1,001); Orono, ME
December 11, 2022*; 1:00 pm		at Merrimack	W 50–47	6–4	Hammel Court (1,712); North Andover, MA
December 19, 2022*; 7:00 pm, ESPN+		at Akron	L 55–87	6–5	James A. Rhodes Arena (1,424); Akron, OH
December 21, 2022*; 8:30 pm, BTN		at Ohio State	L 61–95	6–6	Value City Arena (10,461); Columbus, OH
December 28, 2022*; 7:00 pm, ESPN+		Harvard	L 73–74 ^{OT}	6–7	Cross Insurance Center (994); Bangor, ME
America East Conference regular season
January 5, 2023; 6:00 pm, ESPN+		at UMass Lowell	L 70–72	6–8 (0–1)	Costello Athletic Center (379); Lowell, MA
January 8, 2023; 2:00 pm, ESPN+		NJIT	L 83–91 ^{OT}	6–9 (0–2)	Memorial Gymnasium (835); Orono, ME
January 11, 2023; 7:00 pm, ESPN+		New Hampshire	L 58–71	6–10 (0–3)	Cross Insurance Center (772); Bangor, ME
January 14, 2023; 1:00 pm, ESPN3		at UMBC	L 77–85	6–11 (0–4)	Chesapeake Employers Insurance Arena (1,457); Catonsville, MD
January 19, 2023; 7:00 pm, ESPN+		at Vermont	L 45–66	6–12 (0–5)	Patrick Gym (2,377); Burlington, VT
January 22, 2023; 2:00 pm, ESPN+		Binghamton	W 78–57	7–12 (1–5)	Cross Insurance Center (892); Bangor, ME
January 25, 2023; 7:00 pm, ESPN+		UMass Lowell	W 75–70	8–12 (2–5)	Cross Insurance Center (766); Bangor, ME
January 28, 2023; 7:00 pm, ESPN3		at Albany	W 72–68	9–12 (3–5)	McDonough Sports Complex (1,305); Troy, NY
February 1, 2023; 7:00 pm, ESPN+		at Bryant	L 53–71	9–13 (3–6)	Chace Athletic Center (750); Smithfield, RI
February 4, 2023; 2:00 pm, ESPN3		UMBC	W 84–49	10–13 (4–6)	Memorial Gymnasium; Orono, ME
February 8, 2023; 7:00 pm, ESPN+		Vermont	L 65–74	10–14 (4–7)	Cross Insurance Center (785); Bangor, ME
February 11, 2023; 4:00 pm, ESPN3		at NJIT	L 50–65	10–15 (4–8)	Wellness and Events Center (489); Newark, NJ
February 18, 2023; 2:00 pm, ESPN3		Albany	W 74–72	11–15 (5–8)	Memorial Gymnasium (907); Orono, ME
February 22, 2023; 7:00 pm, ESPN+		at New Hampshire	L 62–74	11–16 (5–9)	Lundholm Gym (611); Durham, NH
February 25, 2023; 2:00 pm, ESPN3		at Binghamton	W 71–67 ^{OT}	12–16 (6–9)	Binghamton University Events Center (3,678); Vestal, NY
February 28, 2023; 7:00 pm, ESPN+		Bryant	W 66–64	13–16 (7–9)	Cross Insurance Center (795); Bangor, ME
America East tournament
March 4, 2023; 4:00 pm, ESPN+	(7)	at (2) UMass Lowell; Quarterfinals	L 54–85	13–17	Costello Athletic Center (856); Lowell, MA
*Non-conference game. ^{#}Rankings from AP Poll. (#) Tournament seedings in parentheses. All times are in Eastern.
