= 2022–23 UMBC Retrievers men's basketball team =

American college basketball season

2022–23 UMBC Retrievers men's basketball
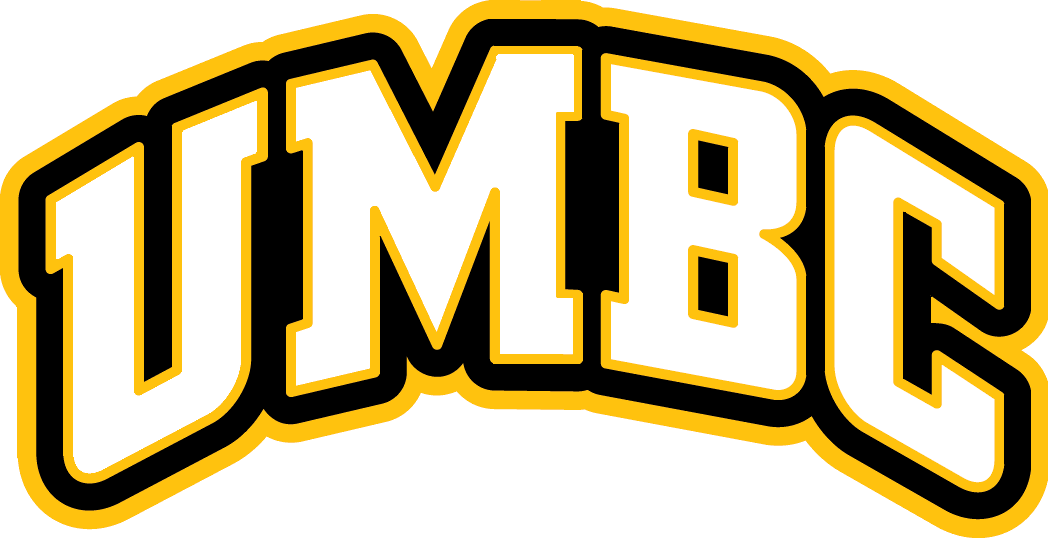
- Conference: America East Conference
- Record: 18–14 (8–8 America East)
- Head coach: Jim Ferry (2nd season)
- Assistant coaches: Danny Lawson; Brian Baudinet; Evann Baker
- Home arena: Chesapeake Employers Insurance Arena

2022–23 America East Conference men's basketball standings
	Conf.				Overall
Team	W		L	PCT	W		L	PCT
Vermont †	14	–	2	.875	23	–	11	.676
UMass Lowell	11	–	5	.688	26	–	8	.765
New Hampshire	9	–	7	.563	15	–	15	.500
UMBC	8	–	8	.500	18	–	14	.563
Binghamton	8	–	8	.500	13	–	18	.419
Bryant	8	–	8	.500	17	–	13	.567
Maine	7	–	9	.438	13	–	17	.433
NJIT	4	–	12	.250	7	–	23	.233
Albany	3	–	13	.188	8	–	23	.258
† 2023 AmEast Tournament winner

The 2022–23 UMBC Retrievers men's basketball team represented the University of Maryland, Baltimore County in the 2022–23 NCAA Division I men's basketball season. The Retrievers, led by second-year head coach Jim Ferry, played their home games at the Chesapeake Employers Insurance Arena in Catonsville, Maryland as members of the America East Conference. They finished the season 18–14, 8–8 in America East play, to finish in a three-way tie for fourth place. As the No. 4 seed in the America East tournament, they lost in the quarterfinals to Binghamton.

== Previous season ==
The Retrievers finished the 2021–22 season 18–14, 11–7 in America East play, to finish in second place. They defeated UMass Lowell and Hartford to advance to the championship game of the America East tournament where they lost to Vermont. They received an invitation to The Basketball Classic, but they withdrew from the tournament one day before they were scheduled to play citing a lack of healthy players.

== Roster ==
2022–23 UMBC Retrievers men's basketball team
Players
Coaches

Pos.	#	Name	Height	Weight	Year	Hometown
G/F	0	Regimantas Ciunys	6 ft 6 in (1.98 m)	180 lb (82 kg)	Fr	Vilnius, Lithuania
F	1	Jarvis Doles	6 ft 8 in (2.03 m)	210 lb (95 kg)	GS	Baltimore, MD
G	2	Colton Lawrence	6 ft 3 in (1.91 m)	205 lb (93 kg)	GS	Myerstown, PA
G	3	Craig II Beaudion	6 ft 3 in (1.91 m)	180 lb (82 kg)	GS	Chicago, IL
F	4	Tra'Von Fagan	6 ft 7 in (2.01 m)	220 lb (100 kg)	GS	Waterloo, IA
G/F	5	Tre Edwards	6 ft 7 in (2.01 m)	195 lb (88 kg)	Jr	Hamilton, ON
G	10	Devan Sapp	6 ft 4 in (1.93 m)	205 lb (93 kg)	So	San Jose, CA
G/F	12	Patrick Jones	6 ft 3 in (1.91 m)	—	Jr	Columbia, MD
G	13	Dion Brown	6 ft 3 in (1.91 m)	180 lb (82 kg)	Fr	Great Barrington, MA
G	14	Mason Docks	6 ft 0 in (1.83 m)	165 lb (75 kg)	Fr	East Lansing, MI
F	15	Yaw Obeng-Mensah	6 ft 7 in (2.01 m)	215 lb (98 kg)	Sr	Toronto, ON
G	20	JC Harris	6 ft 1 in (1.85 m)	170 lb (77 kg)	So	Gaithersburg, MD
F	21	Anyang Garang	6 ft 9 in (2.06 m)	210 lb (95 kg)	Jr	Adelaide, Australia
G	22	Ethan Lynch	6 ft 2 in (1.88 m)	215 lb (98 kg)	Jr	Washington, D.C.
G	34	Matteo Picarelli	6 ft 2 in (1.88 m)	185 lb (84 kg)	Jr	Milan, Italy
G	41	Jacob Boonyasith	6 ft 3 in (1.91 m)	215 lb (98 kg)	Sr	Grand Rapids, MI

Head coach

- Jim Ferry (Keene State)

Assistant coach(es)

- Danny Lawson (Bentley)
- Evann Baker (Quinnipiac)
- Brian Baudinet (UMass)

Legend

- (C) Team captain
- (S) Suspended
- (I) Ineligible
- (W) Walk-on
- Injured
- Current redshirt

Roster
Last update: January 16, 2023

== Schedule and results ==
Date time, TV	Rank^{#}	Opponent^{#}	Result	Record	Site (attendance) city, state
Regular season
November 7, 2022*; 8:30 p.m., ESPN+		at Tulane	L 67–89	0–1	Devlin Fieldhouse (885); New Orleans, LA
November 10, 2022*; 7:00 p.m., ESPN+		Penn State York	W 92–65	1–1	Chesapeake Employers Insurance Arena (1,621); Catonsville, MD
November 14, 2022*; 6:00 p.m., MASN/ESPN+		Princeton	L 64–94	1–2	Chesapeake Employers Insurance Arena (2,097); Catonsville, MD
November 18, 2022*; 2:00 p.m., ESPN3		Lafayette	W 71–63	2–2	Chesapeake Employers Insurance Arena (974); Catonsville, MD
November 20, 2022*; 1:00 p.m., ESPN+		Central Connecticut	W 78–76	3–2	Chesapeake Employers Insurance Arena (869); Catonsville, MD
November 22, 2022*; 7:00 p.m., ESPN+		at UNC Greensboro	L 72–76	3–3	Greensboro Coliseum (1,257); Greensboro, NC
November 26, 2022*; 12:00 p.m., FS2		at Georgetown	L 70–79	3–4	Capital One Arena (4,134); Washington, D.C.
November 30, 2022*; 7:00 p.m., ESPN+		Coppin State	W 109–82	4–4	Chesapeake Employers Insurance Arena (1,475); Catonsville, MD
December 3, 2022*; 2:00 p.m., ESPN+		at Lehigh	W 88–62	5–4	Stabler Arena (596); Bethlehem, PA
December 6, 2022*; 7:00 p.m., ESPN+		at Columbia	W 73–66	6–4	Levien Gymnasium (560); New York, NY
December 10, 2022*; 5:30 p.m., ESPN3		Morgan State	W 75–63	7–4	Chesapeake Employers Insurance Arena (2,030); Catonsville, MD
December 13, 2022*; 7:00 p.m., ESPN+		at Loyola (MD)	W 72–69	8–4	Reitz Arena (804); Baltimore, MD
December 18, 2022*; 1:00 p.m., ESPN+		William & Mary	W 78–62	9–4	Chesapeake Employers Insurance Arena (1,036); Catonsville, MD
December 29, 2022*; 7:00 p.m., ESPNU		at Maryland	L 64–80	9–5	Xfinity Center (13,522); College Park, MD
January 1, 2023; 1:00 p.m., ESPN+		Vermont	L 61–74	9–6 (0–1)	Chesapeake Employers Insurance Arena (1,535); Catonsville, MD
January 5, 2023; 7:00 p.m., ESPN+		Albany	W 92–83	10–6 (1–1)	Chesapeake Employers Insurance Arena (1,075); Catonsville, MD
January 8, 2023; 1:00 p.m., ESPN+		at Bryant	W 81–73	11–6 (2–1)	Chace Athletic Center (750); Smithfield, RI
January 14, 2023; 1:00 p.m., ESPN3		Maine	W 85–77	12–6 (3–1)	Chesapeake Employers Insurance Arena (1,475); Catonsville, MD
January 16, 2023*; 5:00 p.m., ESPN+		Hartford	W 87–62	13–6	Chesapeake Employers Insurance Arena (1,585); Catonsville, MD
January 18, 2023; 6:00 p.m., ESPN+		at UMass Lowell	L 75–81	13–7 (3–2)	Costello Athletic Center (641); Lowell, MA
January 21, 2023; 1:00 p.m., ESPN+		New Hampshire	W 80–69	14–7 (4–2)	Chesapeake Employers Insurance Arena (1,375); Catonsville, MD
January 25, 2023; 7:00 p.m., ESPN+		at NJIT	L 65–69	14–8 (4–3)	Wellness and Events Center (411); Newark, NJ
January 28, 2023; 12:00 p.m., ESPN+		at Vermont	L 68–74	14–9 (4–4)	Patrick Gym (2,418); Burlington, VT
February 1, 2023; 7:00 p.m., ESPN+		Binghamton	W 69–55	15–9 (5–4)	Chesapeake Employers Insurance Arena (2,880); Catonsville, MD
February 4, 2023; 2:00 p.m., ESPN3		at Maine	L 49–84	15–10 (5–5)	Memorial Gymnasium; Orono, ME
February 8, 2023; 7:00 p.m., ESPN+		NJIT	W 72–63	16–10 (6–5)	Chesapeake Employers Insurance Arena (1,422); Catonsville, MD
February 11, 2023; 1:00 p.m., ESPN3		Bryant	W 76–73	17–10 (7–5)	Chesapeake Employers Insurance Arena (2,055); Catonsville, MD
February 15, 2023; 7:00 p.m., ESPN+		at Albany	L 74–81	17–11 (7–6)	McDonough Sports Complex (1,104); Troy, NY
February 18, 2023; 1:00 p.m., ESPN3		at New Hampshire	L 66–75	17–12 (7–7)	Lundholm Gym (1,615); Durham, NH
February 22, 2023; 6:00 p.m., ESPN+		UMass Lowell	L 70–75	17–13 (7–8)	Chesapeake Employers Insurance Arena (2,074); Catonsville, MD
February 28, 2023; 7:00 p.m., ESPN+		at Binghamton	W 70–67 ^{OT}	18–13 (8–8)	Binghamton University Events Center (2,302); Vestal, NY
America East tournament
March 4, 2023; 2:00 p.m., ESPN+	(4)	(5) Binghamton; Quarterfinals	L 65–67	18–14	Chesapeake Employers Insurance Arena (1,705); Catonsville, MD
*Non-conference game. ^{#}Rankings from AP poll. (#) Tournament seedings in parentheses. All times are in Eastern.
