= 2022–23 UMass Lowell River Hawks men's basketball team =

American college basketball season

2022–23 UMass Lowell River Hawks men's basketball
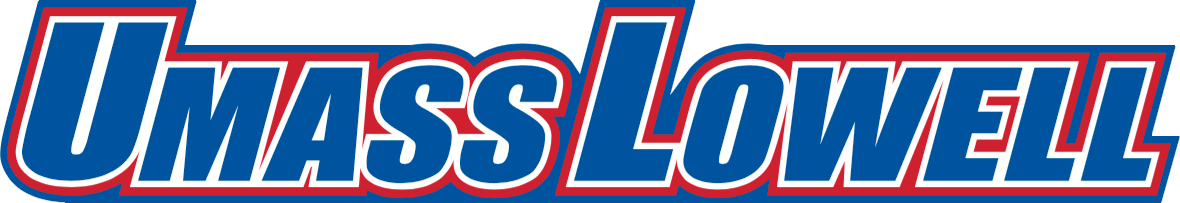
- Conference: America East Conference
- Record: 26–8 (11–5 America East)
- Head coach: Pat Duquette (10th season)
- Assistant coaches: Louis Hinnant; Matt Graves; Jon Iati
- Home arena: Costello Athletic Center

2022–23 America East Conference men's basketball standings
	Conf.				Overall
Team	W		L	PCT	W		L	PCT
Vermont †	14	–	2	.875	23	–	11	.676
UMass Lowell	11	–	5	.688	26	–	8	.765
New Hampshire	9	–	7	.563	15	–	15	.500
UMBC	8	–	8	.500	18	–	14	.563
Binghamton	8	–	8	.500	13	–	18	.419
Bryant	8	–	8	.500	17	–	13	.567
Maine	7	–	9	.438	13	–	17	.433
NJIT	4	–	12	.250	7	–	23	.233
Albany	3	–	13	.188	8	–	23	.258
† 2023 AmEast Tournament winner

The 2022–23 UMass Lowell River Hawks men's basketball team represented the University of Massachusetts Lowell in the 2022–23 NCAA Division I men's basketball season. They played their home games at the Costello Athletic Center in Lowell, Massachusetts and were led by 10th-year head coach Pat Duquette. They finished the season 26–8, 11–5 in America East play, to finish in second place. They defeated Maine and New Hampshire in the America East tournament before losing to Vermont in the championship game.

== Previous season ==
The River Hawks finished the 2021–22 season 15–16, 7–11 in America East play, to finish in seventh place. They lost in the quarterfinals of the America East tournament to UMBC.

== Roster ==
2022–23 UMass Lowell River Hawks men's basketball team
Players
Coaches

Pos.	#	Name	Height	Weight	Year	Previous school	Hometown
G	0	Everette Hammond	6 ft 3 in (1.91 m)	185 lb (84 kg)	GS	USC Upstate	Silver Spring, MD
G	1	Brayden O'Connor	6 ft 4 in (1.93 m)	207 lb (94 kg)	Fr	Notre Dame HS	Ottawa, ON
G	2	Ayinde Hikim	5 ft 11 in (1.8 m)	179 lb (81 kg)	Sr	La Salle	Washington, D.C.
G/F	3	Quinton Mincey	6 ft 7 in (2.01 m)	195 lb (88 kg)	Jr	Mount St. Mary's	Upper Marlboro, MD
G	4	Yuri Covington	6 ft 1 in (1.85 m)	192 lb (87 kg)	Jr	William & Mary	Wilkes-Barre, PA
F	5	Connor Withers	6 ft 7 in (2.01 m)	195 lb (88 kg)	Sr	Osbourn HS	Manassas, VA
F	10	Max Brooks	6 ft 7 in (2.01 m)	205 lb (93 kg)	Jr	St. Charles HS	Waldorf, MD
G	11	Mikey Watkins	5 ft 11 in (1.8 m)	175 lb (79 kg)	GS	Merrimack	Roselle, NJ
F	12	Darion Jordan-Thomas	6 ft 7 in (2.01 m)	210 lb (95 kg)	Sr	Wagner	Brockton, MA
F	13	Abdoul Karim Coulibaly	6 ft 9 in (2.06 m)	235 lb (107 kg)	Sr	St. Bonaventure	Bamako, Mali
G	14	Anthony Blunt	6 ft 2 in (1.88 m)	185 lb (84 kg)	Jr	St. Vincent Pallotti HS	Crownsville, MD
F	15	Allin Blunt	6 ft 7 in (2.01 m)	205 lb (93 kg)	GS	Gonzaga College HS	Crownsville, MD
F	23	Cam III Morris	6 ft 8 in (2.03 m)	205 lb (93 kg)	So	IMG Academy	Alexander City, AL
F	33	Ephraim Acquah	6 ft 7 in (2.01 m)	192 lb (87 kg)	So	Williamsport HS	Hagerstown, MD

Head coach

- Pat Duquette (Williams)

Assistant coach(es)

- Louis Hinnant (Boston College)
- Jon Iati (Albany)
- Matt Graves (Belmont Abbey)

Legend

- (C) Team captain
- (S) Suspended
- (I) Ineligible
- (W) Walk-on
- Injured
- Current redshirt

Roster
Last update: January 16, 2023

== Schedule and results ==
Date time, TV	Rank^{#}	Opponent^{#}	Result	Record	Site (attendance) city, state
Regular season
November 7, 2022*; 6:00 p.m., ESPN3		Fisher	W 108–43	1–0	Costello Athletic Center (511); Lowell, MA
November 10, 2022*; 7:00 p.m., ESPN+		at Columbia	W 89–62	2–0	Levien Gymnasium (676); New York, NY
November 12, 2022*; 2:00 p.m., BTN+		at Rutgers	L 65–73	2–1	Jersey Mike's Arena (8,000); Piscataway, NJ
November 16, 2022*; 4:00 p.m., ESPN+		Sacred Heart	W 90–81	3–1	Costello Athletic Center (608); Lowell, MA
November 19, 2022*; 5:00 p.m., ESPN3		Emerson	W 105–53	4–1	Costello Athletic Center (547); Lowell, MA
November 23, 2022*; 7:00 p.m., ESPN+		at Brown	W 73–62	5–1	Pizzitola Sports Center (497); Providence, RI
November 27, 2022*; 7:00 p.m., ESPN+		Stonehill	W 73–59	6–1	Costello Athletic Center (410); Lowell, MA
November 30, 2022*; 6:00 p.m., ESPN+		Merrimack	W 77–51	7–1	Costello Athletic Center (482); Lowell, MA
December 3, 2022*; 2:00 p.m., NEC Front Row		at Sacred Heart	W 70–59	8–1	William H. Pitt Center (517); Fairfield, CT
December 5, 2022*; 7:00 p.m., NEC Front Row		at LIU	W 84–64	9–1	Steinberg Wellness Center (456); Brooklyn, NY
December 8, 2022*; 7:00 p.m., NESN		at UMass	W 85–80	10–1	Mullins Center (3,720); Amherst, MA
December 10, 2022*; 5:00 p.m., ESPN3		St. Francis Brooklyn	W 68–59	11–1	Tsongas Center (2,025); Lowell, MA
December 13, 2022*; 7:00 p.m., ESPN+		at Rhode Island	L 75–77 ^{OT}	11–2	Ryan Center (3,829); Kingston, RI
December 21, 2022*; 4:00 p.m., ESPN+		Boston University	W 68–60	12–2	Costello Athletic Center (452); Lowell, MA
December 31, 2022; 2:00 p.m., ESPN3		at NJIT	W 67–64	13–2 (1–0)	Wellness and Events Center (222); Newark, NJ
January 5, 2023; 6:00 p.m., ESPN+		Maine	W 72–70	14–2 (2–0)	Costello Athletic Center (379); Lowell, MA
January 8, 2023; 3:00 p.m., ESPN+		at Albany	L 63–89	14–3 (2–1)	McDonough Sports Complex (1,308); Troy, NY
January 11, 2023; 6:00 p.m., ESPN+		Vermont	W 80–65	15–3 (3–1)	Costello Athletic Center (517); Lowell, MA
January 14, 2023; 2:00 p.m., ESPN3		at Binghamton	L 65–66	15–4 (3–2)	Binghamton University Events Center (2,014); Vestal, NY
January 18, 2023; 6:00 p.m., ESPN+		UMBC	W 81–75	16–4 (4–2)	Costello Athletic Center (641); Lowell, MA
January 22, 2023; 1:00 p.m., ESPN+		Bryant	W 98–79	17–4 (5–2)	Costello Athletic Center (850); Lowell, MA
January 25, 2023; 7:00 p.m., ESPN+		at Maine	L 70–75	17–5 (5–3)	Cross Insurance Center (766); Bangor, ME
January 28, 2023; 1:00 p.m., ESPN3		at New Hampshire	L 65–69	17–6 (5–4)	Lundholm Gym (804); Durham, NH
February 1, 2023; 6:00 p.m., ESPN+		Albany	W 66–50	18–6 (6–4)	Costello Athletic Center (811); Lowell, MA
February 4, 2023; 1:00 p.m., ESPN3		NJIT	W 90–61	19–6 (7–4)	Costello Athletic Center (527); Lowell, MA
February 6, 2023*; 6:00 p.m.		at Hartford	W 70–48	20–6	Chase Arena (279); West Hartford, CT
February 11, 2023; 7:00 p.m., ESPN3		at Vermont	L 81–93	20–7 (7–5)	Patrick Gym (2,737); Burlington, VT
February 15, 2023; 7:00 p.m., ESPN+		at Bryant	W 85–71	21–7 (8–5)	Chace Athletic Center (842); Smithfield, RI
February 18, 2023; 1:00 p.m., ESPN3		Binghamton	W 84–70	22–7 (9–5)	Costello Athletic Center (703); Lowell, MA
February 22, 2023; 6:00 p.m., ESPN+		at UMBC	W 75–70	23–7 (10–5)	Chesapeake Employers Insurance Arena (2,074); Catonsville, MD
February 25, 2023; 5:00 p.m., ESPN3		New Hampshire	W 92–55	24–7 (11–5)	Tsongas Center (4,114); Lowell, MA
America East tournament
March 4, 2023; 4:00 p.m., ESPN+	(2)	(7) Maine; Quarterfinals	W 85–54	25–7	Costello Athletic Center (856); Lowell, MA
March 7, 2023; 6:00 p.m., ESPN+	(2)	(3) New Hampshire; Semifinals	W 75–64	26–7	Costello Athletic Center (856); Lowell, MA
March 11, 2023; 11:00 a.m., ESPN2/ESPN+	(2)	at (1) Vermont; Championship	L 59–72	26–8	Patrick Gym; Burlington, VT
*Non-conference game. ^{#}Rankings from AP poll. (#) Tournament seedings in parentheses. All times are in Eastern.
