= 2022–23 Binghamton Bearcats men's basketball team =

American college basketball season

2022–23 Binghamton Bearcats men's basketball
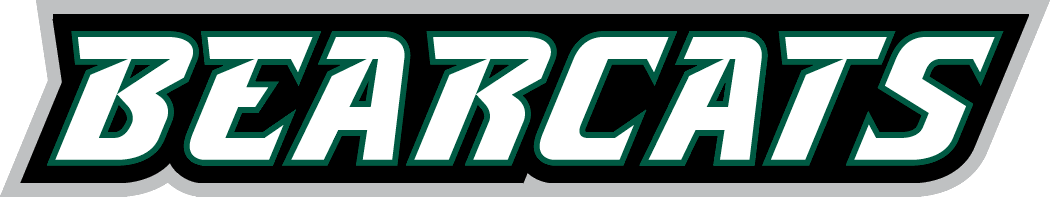
- Conference: America East Conference
- Record: 13–18 (8–8 America East)
- Head coach: Levell Sanders (2nd season)
- Assistant coaches: Brian Johnson; Marlon Guild; Patrick Norris
- Home arena: Binghamton University Events Center

2022–23 America East Conference men's basketball standings
	Conf.				Overall
Team	W		L	PCT	W		L	PCT
Vermont †	14	–	2	.875	23	–	11	.676
UMass Lowell	11	–	5	.688	26	–	8	.765
New Hampshire	9	–	7	.563	15	–	15	.500
UMBC	8	–	8	.500	18	–	14	.563
Binghamton	8	–	8	.500	13	–	18	.419
Bryant	8	–	8	.500	17	–	13	.567
Maine	7	–	9	.438	13	–	17	.433
NJIT	4	–	12	.250	7	–	23	.233
Albany	3	–	13	.188	8	–	23	.258
† 2023 AmEast Tournament winner

The 2022–23 Binghamton Bearcats men's basketball team represented Binghamton University in the 2022–23 NCAA Division I men's basketball season. They played their home games at the Binghamton University Events Center in Vestal, New York, led by second-year head coach Levell Sanders. They finished the season 13-18, 8-8 in America East Play for a three-way-tie for 4th place. They defeated UMBC in the quarterfinals of the America East Tournament before losing to Vermont in the semifinals.

== Previous season ==
The Bearcats finished the 2021–22 season 12–17 overall, 8–10 in conference play to finish in sixth place. They defeated New Hampshire in the quarterfinals of the America East tournament before losing in the semifinals to Vermont.

== Roster ==
2022–23 Binghamton Bearcats men's basketball team
Players
Coaches

Pos.	#	Name	Height	Weight	Year	Previous school	Hometown
G	0	John McGriff	6 ft 0 in (1.83 m)	185 lb (84 kg)	Jr	St. John's	Glenn Dale, MD
F	1	Tariq Balogun	6 ft 10 in (2.08 m)	240 lb (109 kg)	Jr	Eastern Kentucky	London, England
G	2	Armon Harried	6 ft 5 in (1.96 m)	205 lb (93 kg)	Jr	Canisius	Baltimore, MD
G	3	Jacob Falko	6 ft 3 in (1.91 m)	190 lb (86 kg)	Sr	Gardner–Webb	North East, MD
G	4	Masud Stewart	6 ft 1 in (1.85 m)	185 lb (84 kg)	Fr	Neumann–Goretti HS	New Castle, DE
F	10	Miles Gibson	6 ft 6 in (1.98 m)	205 lb (93 kg)	GS	Metro State	Richmond, VA
G	11	Dan Petcash	6 ft 4 in (1.93 m)	205 lb (93 kg)	Sr	Pine-Richland HS	Pittsburgh, PA
F	13	Taveion White	6 ft 8 in (2.03 m)	220 lb (100 kg)	Sr	Clarendon College	Prosper, TX
C	15	Ador Athuai	6 ft 11 in (2.11 m)	200 lb (91 kg)	Sr	The Knox School	Twic, South Sudan
F	21	Ogheneyole Akuwovo	6 ft 9 in (2.06 m)	220 lb (100 kg)	GS	Howard	Delta State, Nigeria
G	24	Christian Hinckson	6 ft 6 in (1.98 m)	210 lb (95 kg)	GS	Manhattan	Queens, NY
G	30	Matt Solomon	6 ft 3 in (1.91 m)	190 lb (86 kg)	So	Allan Hancock	Newbury Park, CA

Head coach

- Levell Sanders (Seton Hall)

Assistant coach(es)

- Brian Johnson (Delaware)
- Marlon Guild (Hartford)
- Patrick Norris (Notre Dame)

Legend

- (C) Team captain
- (S) Suspended
- (I) Ineligible
- (W) Walk-on
- Injured
- Current redshirt

Roster
Last update: October 25, 2022

== Schedule and results ==
Date time, TV	Rank^{#}	Opponent^{#}	Result	Record	Site (attendance) city, state
Non-conference regular season
November 7, 2022*; 7:30 pm, ESPN3		Cazenovia	W 87–56	1–0	Binghamton University Events Center (1,721); Vestal, NY
November 12, 2022*; 7:00 pm, ESPN3		at Marist	W 78–75	2–0	McCann Arena (1,096); Poughkeepsie, NY
November 15, 2022*; 7:00 pm, BTN		at Maryland	L 52–76	2–1	Xfinity Center (10,349); College Park, MD
November 19, 2022*; 2:00 pm, ESPN3		Sacred Heart	L 60–75	2–2	Binghamton University Events Center (1,802); Vestal, NY
November 23, 2022*; 2:00 pm, ESPN+		Columbia	W 81–79	3–2	Binghamton University Events Center (1,243); Vestal, NY
November 26, 2022*; 2:00 pm, ESPN+		at La Salle	L 62–65	3–3	Tom Gola Arena (1,247); Philadelphia, PA
November 30, 2022*; 6:00 pm, ESPN+		Loyola (MD)	L 70–84	3–4	Binghamton University Events Center (1,252); Vestal, NY
December 3, 2022*; 4:00 pm, ESPN3		Stonehill	L 66–69	3–5	Binghamton University Events Center (1,600); Vestal, NY
December 7, 2022*; 7:30 pm, ESPN+		Colgate	L 62–81	3–6	Binghamton University Events Center (1,558); Vestal, NY
December 9, 2022*; 7:00 pm, ESPN+		at Fordham	L 62–77	3–7	Rose Hill Gymnasium; Bronx, NY
December 17, 2022*; 2:00 pm, ESPN3		Oneonta	W 86–58	4–7	Binghamton University Events Center (1,399); Vestal, NY
December 21, 2022*; 7:00 pm, ESPN+		at Niagara	L 67–73	4–8	Gallagher Center (757); Lewiston, NY
December 29, 2022*; 7:00 pm, ESPN+		at Cornell	L 70–86	4–9	Newman Arena (522); Ithaca, NY
America East Conference regular season
December 31, 2022; 1:00 pm, ESPN+		at Bryant	L 78–82	4–10 (0–1)	Chace Athletic Center (1,050); Smithfield, RI
January 5, 2023; 7:00 pm, ESPN+		New Hampshire	W 68–50	5–10 (1–1)	Binghamton University Events Center (1,296); Vestal, NY
January 11, 2023; 7:00 pm, ESPN+		at NJIT	W 72–71 ^{OT}	6–10 (2–1)	Wellness and Events Center (411); Newark, NJ
January 14, 2023; 2:00 pm, ESPN3		UMass Lowell	W 66–65	7–10 (3–1)	Binghamton University Events Center (2,014); Vestal, NY
January 19, 2023; 7:00 pm, ESPN+		at Albany	W 65–54	8–10 (4–1)	McDonough Sports Complex (1,161); Troy, NY
January 22, 2023; 2:00 pm, ESPN+		at Maine	L 57–78	8–11 (4–2)	Cross Insurance Center (892); Bangor, ME
January 25, 2023; 7:00 pm, ESPN+		Vermont	L 55–80	8–12 (4–3)	Binghamton University Events Center (3,570); Vestal, NY
January 28, 2023; 2:00 pm, ESPN3		Bryant	W 84–67	9–12 (5–3)	Binghamton University Events Center (3,394); Vestal, NY
February 1, 2023; 7:00 pm, ESPN+		at UMBC	L 55–69	9–13 (5–4)	Chesapeake Employers Insurance Arena (2,880); Catonsville, MD
February 8, 2023; 7:00 pm, ESPN+		at New Hampshire	W 66–64	10–13 (6–4)	Lundholm Gym (519); Durham, NH
February 11, 2023; 2:00 pm, ESPN3		Albany	W 80–66 ^{OT}	11–13 (7–4)	Binghamton University Events Center (2,746); Vestal, NY
February 15, 2023; 7:00 pm, ESPN+		NJIT	W 86–67	12–13 (8–4)	Binghamton University Events Center (2,082); Vestal, NY
February 18, 2023; 1:00 pm, ESPN3		at UMass Lowell	L 70–84	12–14 (8–5)	Costello Athletic Center (703); Lowell, MA
February 22, 2023; 7:00 pm, ESPN+		at Vermont	L 70–81	12–15 (8–6)	Patrick Gym (2,299); Burlington, VT
February 25, 2023; 2:00 pm, ESPN3		Maine	L 67–71 ^{OT}	12–16 (8–7)	Binghamton University Events Center (3,678); Vestal, NY
February 28, 2023; 7:00 pm, ESPN+		UMBC	L 67–70 ^{OT}	12–17 (8–8)	Binghamton University Events Center (2,302); Vestal, NY
America East tournament
March 4, 2023; 2:00 pm, ESPN+	(5)	at (4) UMBC; Quarterfinals	W 67–65	13–17	Chesapeake Employers Insurance Arena (1,705); Catonsville, MD
March 7, 2023; 7:00 pm, ESPN+	(5)	at (1) Vermont; Semifinals	L 57–79	13–18	Patrick Gym (2,451); Burlington, VT
*Non-conference game. ^{#}Rankings from AP Poll. (#) Tournament seedings in parentheses. All times are in Eastern.
