= Doug Edert =

American basketball player (born 2000)

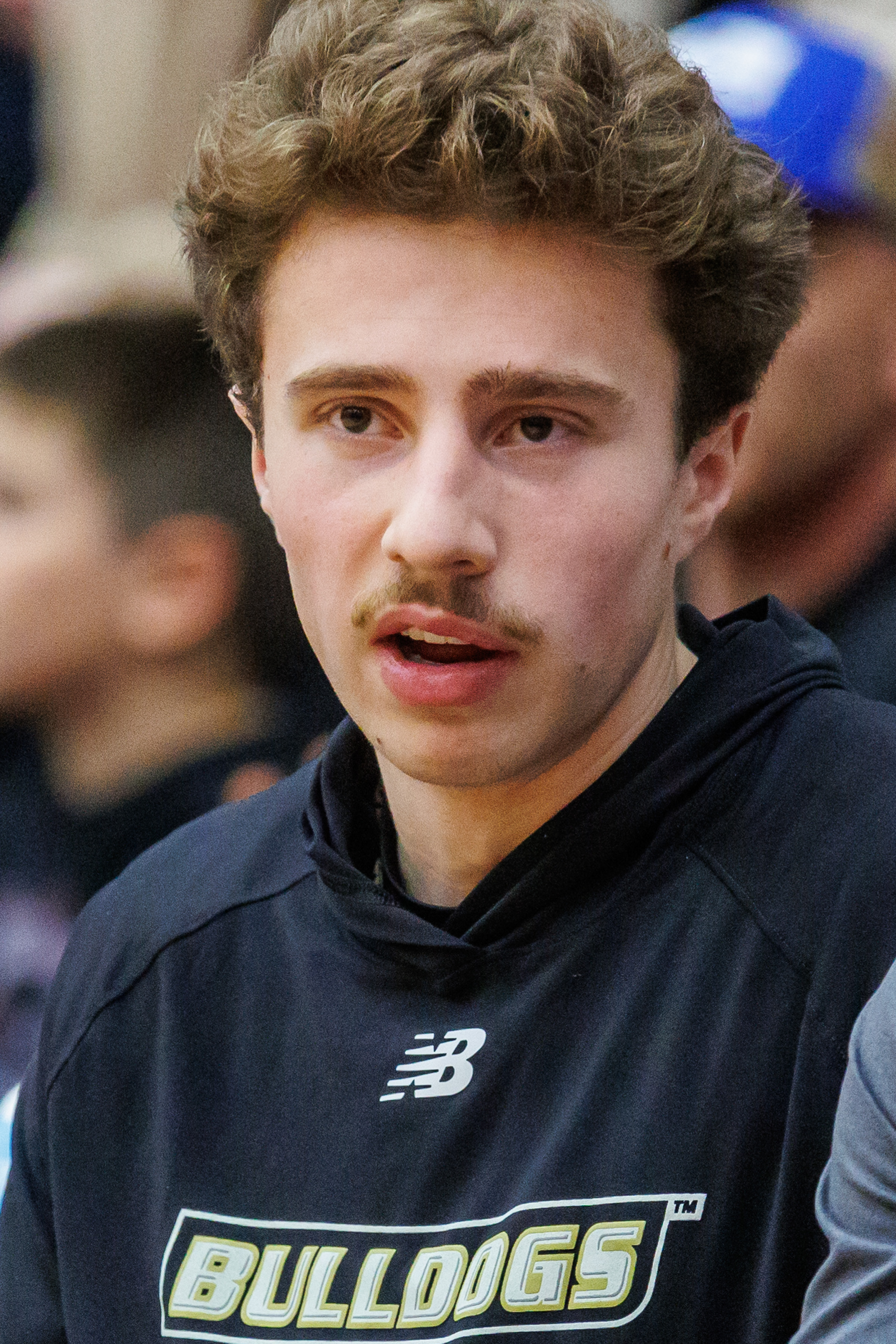

Personal information
- Born: March 5, 2000 (age 26) Nutley, New Jersey, U.S.
- Listed height: 6 ft 2 in (1.88 m)
- Listed weight: 185 lb (84 kg)

Career information
- High school: Bergen Catholic (Oradell, New Jersey)
- College: Saint Peter's (2019–2022); Bryant (2022–2024)
- NBA draft: 2024: undrafted
- Position: Point guard

Career highlights
- MAAC All-Rookie Team (2020)

Douglas Ryan Edert (born March 5, 2000) is an American college basketball player who last played for the Bryant Bulldogs of the America East Conference. He also played for the Saint Peter's Peacocks. Edert is best known for his integral role in Saint Peter's historic underdog run to the Elite Eight in the 2022 NCAA Division I men's basketball tournament.

During the 2022 NCAA Division I men's basketball tournament, Edert initially gained popularity for his mustache and his performances when the Peacocks upset second-seeded Kentucky in the Round of 64, and then the seventh-seeded Murray State in the Round of 32. In the regional semifinals, the team beat third-seeded Purdue to become the first 15th-seeded team to advance to the Elite 8. During this run, he became a phenomenon within the basketball community and was given nicknames such as Dougie Buckets and Dirty Doug, the latter of which also become the name of a Barstool Sports clothing line.

== High school career ==
Edert played prep basketball at Bergen Catholic High School. In his senior year, Edert helped propel the team to a Non-Public A State title in the NJSIAA boys' basketball playoffs. In the same year, he led the team to win the 63rd Bergen Jamboree against Don Bosco Preparatory High School, their first win against the school in five years during the Bergen Jamboree. On September 26, 2018, Edert committed to playing college basketball for Saint Peter's.

== College career ==
=== Saint Peter's ===
During the 2022 NCAA Division I men's basketball tournament, he gained popularity after his performances during games against Kentucky and Murray State. Edert also gained popularity for a mustache that according to Edert, was supposed to be temporary. However, with his success in the tournament, that may have changed as he was quoted saying "Maybe the mustache is giving me powers." On April 5, 2022, Edert entered the transfer portal following three seasons at Saint Peter's.

=== Bryant ===
On April 9, 2022, Edert announced his commitment to Bryant.

== Career statistics ==
Legend
GP	Games played	GS	Games started	MPG	Minutes per game
FG%	Field goal percentage	3P%	3-point field goal percentage	FT%	Free throw percentage
RPG	Rebounds per game	APG	Assists per game	SPG	Steals per game
BPG	Blocks per game	PPG	Points per game	**Bold**	Career high

=== College ===
Year	Team	GP	GS	MPG	FG%	3P%	FT%	RPG	APG	SPG	BPG	PPG
2019–20	Saint Peter's	30	7	17.3	.440	**.442**	.767	1.8	.6	.2	.1	7.8
2020–21	Saint Peter's	23	9	**24.3**	.335	.318	.848	**3.3**	.7	**.8**	**.2**	7.7
2021–22	Saint Peter's	**33**	7	23.9	**.453**	.411	**.887**	2.5	.9	.5	.1	**9.5**
2022–23	Bryant	30	**15**	20.5	.329	.312	.829	2.1	**1.1**	.3	.1	5.4
2023–24	Bryant	32	2	14.3	.394	.367	.872	1.5	.8	.3	.1	4.7
Career		148	40	19.9	.395	.372	.850	2.2	.8	.4	.1	7.0

== Coaching ==
=== Bergen Catholic ===
For the 2024-25 season, Edert returned to his high school alma mater to work as a varsity assistant and JV head basketball coach.

== Personal life ==
Edert is the son of Allison and William Edert. He has a brother, Nick, who is an officer in the Newark Police Department. Edert is married to college sweetheart, Olyvia (Smith) Edert.

On March 23, 2022, Edert signed a NIL (Note: Name, image, and likeness) deal with restaurant chain Buffalo Wild Wings.
