= 2023 America East men's basketball tournament =

American college basketball postseason tournament

- Classification: Division I
- Season: 2022–23
- Teams: 8
- Site: Campus sites
- Champions: Vermont (9th title)
- Winning coach: John Becker (5th title)
- MVP: Dylan Penn (Vermont)
- Television: ESPN+ ESPN2

The 2023 America East Men's Basketball Conference tournament was the postseason men's basketball tournament for the America East Conference following the 2022-23 conference regular season. It began on March 4, 2023 and ended on March 11, 2023. All tournament games were played on the home arenas of the higher-seeded school. The winner, Vermont, received the conference's automatic bid to the 2023 NCAA Tournament.

2022–23 America East Conference men's basketball standings
	Conf.				Overall
Team	W		L	PCT	W		L	PCT
Vermont †	14	–	2	.875	23	–	11	.676
UMass Lowell	11	–	5	.688	26	–	8	.765
New Hampshire	9	–	7	.563	15	–	15	.500
UMBC	8	–	8	.500	18	–	14	.563
Binghamton	8	–	8	.500	13	–	18	.419
Bryant	8	–	8	.500	17	–	13	.567
Maine	7	–	9	.438	13	–	17	.433
NJIT	4	–	12	.250	7	–	23	.233
Albany	3	–	13	.188	8	–	23	.258
† 2023 AmEast Tournament winner

== Seeds ==
Eight of the nine America East teams contested the tournament. Tiebreakers were applied as necessary to determine seeding.

Seed	School	AEC Record	Tiebreaker
1	Vermont	14–2	
2	UMass Lowell	11–5	
3	New Hampshire	9–7	
4	UMBC	8–8	4–0 vs. Binghamton/Bryant
5	Binghamton	8–8	1–3 vs. UMBC/Bryant; 1–1 vs. UMass Lowell
6	Bryant	8–8	1–3 vs. UMBC/Binghamton; 0–2 vs. UMass Lowell
7	Maine	7–9	
8	NJIT	4–12	
DNQ	Albany	3–13	

== Schedule ==
Game	Time*	Matchup^{#}	Score	Television
Quarterfinals – Saturday, March 4, 2023
1	7:00 pm	No. 8 NJIT at No. 1 Vermont	57–84	ESPN+
2	4:00 pm	No. 7 Maine at No. 2 UMass Lowell	54–85	ESPN+
3	7:00 pm	No. 5 Binghamton at No. 4 UMBC	67–65	ESPN+
4	1:00 pm	No. 6 Bryant at No. 3 New Hampshire	60–67	ESPN+
Semifinals – Tuesday, March 7, 2023
5	7:00 pm	No. 5 Binghamton at No. 1 Vermont	57–79	ESPN+
6	6:00 pm	No. 3 New Hampshire at No. 2 UMass Lowell	64–75	ESPN+
Championship – Saturday, March 11, 2023
7	11:00 am	No. 2 UMass Lowell at No. 1 Vermont	59–72	ESPN2/ESPN+
*Game times in EST. #-Rankings denote tournament seeding.

== Bracket ==
Quarterfinals; Saturday, March 4, 2023; ESPN+
1	Vermont	84
8	NJIT	57
4	UMBC	65
5	Binghamton	67
(Pairings are reseeded after the first round)
2	UMass Lowell	85
7	Maine	54
3	New Hampshire	67
6	Bryant	60

Semifinals; Tuesday, March 7, 2023; ESPN+
1	Vermont	79
5	Binghamton	57
2	UMass Lowell	75
3	New Hampshire	64

Championship; Saturday, March 11, 2023; ESPN2/ESPN+
1	Vermont	72
2	UMass Lowell	59

== See also ==
- 2023 America East women's basketball tournament
- America East Conference men's basketball tournament
