= 2022–23 NJIT Highlanders men's basketball team =

American college basketball season

2022–23 NJIT Highlanders men's basketball
- Conference: America East Conference
- Record: 7–23 (4–12 America East)
- Head coach: Brian Kennedy (7th season)
- Assistant coaches: Art Luptowski; Ricardo Rush Jr.; Danny Manuel
- Home arena: Wellness and Events Center

2022–23 America East Conference men's basketball standings
	Conf.				Overall
Team	W		L	PCT	W		L	PCT
Vermont †	14	–	2	.875	23	–	11	.676
UMass Lowell	11	–	5	.688	26	–	8	.765
New Hampshire	9	–	7	.563	15	–	15	.500
UMBC	8	–	8	.500	18	–	14	.563
Binghamton	8	–	8	.500	13	–	18	.419
Bryant	8	–	8	.500	17	–	13	.567
Maine	7	–	9	.438	13	–	17	.433
NJIT	4	–	12	.250	7	–	23	.233
Albany	3	–	13	.188	8	–	23	.258
† 2023 AmEast Tournament winner

The 2022–23 NJIT Highlanders men's basketball team represented the New Jersey Institute of Technology in the 2022–23 NCAA Division I men's basketball season. The Highlanders, led by seventh-year head coach Brian Kennedy, played their home games at the Wellness and Events Center in Newark, New Jersey as third-year members of the America East Conference. They finished the season 7–23, 4–12 in America East play to finish in 8th place. They lost in the quarterfinals of the America East tournament to Vermont.

== Previous season ==
They finished the season 11–18, 6–12 in America East play to finish in 8th place. They lost in the quarterfinals of the America East tournament to Vermont.

== Roster ==
2022–23 NJIT Highlanders men's basketball team
Players
Coaches

Pos.	#	Name	Height	Weight	Year	Previous school	Hometown
G	0	Raheim Sullivan	6 ft 1 in (1.85 m)	175 lb (79 kg)	GS	Marist	Toronto, ON
G	1	Tre Munson	6 ft 4 in (1.93 m)	180 lb (82 kg)	Sr	PHS Academy	Cincinnati, OH
G	2	Justin Anderson	6 ft 3 in (1.91 m)	170 lb (77 kg)	GS	Bloomsburg	Philadelphia, PA
G	4	Adam Hess	6 ft 4 in (1.93 m)	205 lb (93 kg)	GS	Eastern New Mexico	Westlake Village, CA
F	5	Miles Coleman	6 ft 5 in (1.96 m)	210 lb (95 kg)	Sr	Indian River State College	West Palm Beach, FL
F	10	Eyal Nankin	6 ft 7 in (2.01 m)	210 lb (95 kg)	So	Emek Harod	Ra'anana, Israel
G	13	Karsten Graham	6 ft 5 in (1.96 m)	170 lb (77 kg)	Fr	Covenant School	Charlottesville, VA
F	20	Kevin Osawe	6 ft 7 in (2.01 m)	210 lb (95 kg)	GS	Little Rock	Toronto, ON
F	21	Souleymane Diakite	6 ft 9 in (2.06 m)	230 lb (104 kg)	GS	St. Benedict's Prep	Bamako, Mali
G	24	Mekhi Gray	6 ft 4 in (1.93 m)	190 lb (86 kg)	Jr	Putnam Science Academy	Montrose, NY
F	25	Keeshawn Mason	6 ft 9 in (2.06 m)	235 lb (107 kg)	So	Bella Vista Prep	Shawnee, KS
F	33	Kjell de Graaf	6 ft 10 in (2.08 m)	230 lb (104 kg)	GS	Canarias Basketball Academy	Rotterdam, Netherlands
G	34	Paul McMillan IV	6 ft 2 in (1.88 m)	170 lb (77 kg)	Fr	Woodward High School	Cincinnati, OH
F	35	Da'mir Faison	6 ft 7 in (2.01 m)	200 lb (91 kg)	RS Jr	Hazleton Area High School	Philadelphia, PA

Head coach

- Brian Kennedy (Monmouth)

Assistant coach(es)

- Art Luptowski (Bloomsburg)
- Ricardo Rush Jr. (Maryland)
- Danny Manuel (Davis & Elkins)

Legend

- (C) Team captain
- (S) Suspended
- (I) Ineligible
- (W) Walk-on
- Injured
- Current redshirt

Roster
Last update: January 16, 2023

== Schedule and results ==
Date time, TV	Rank^{#}	Opponent^{#}	Result	Record	Site (attendance) city, state
Non-conference regular season
November 7, 2022*; 7:00 pm, ESPN3		at Saint Peter's	L 59–73	0–1	Run Baby Run Arena (1,129); Jersey City, NJ
November 11, 2022*; 10:00 pm, ESPN+		at California Baptist	L 43–59	0–2	CBU Events Center (5,050); Riverside, CA
November 13, 2022*; 5:00 pm, WCC Network		at San Diego	L 64–74	0–3	Jenny Craig Pavilion (835); San Diego, CA
November 19, 2022*; 4:00 pm, ESPN3		American	L 53–58	0–4	Wellness and Events Center (478); Newark, NJ
November 22, 2022*; 1:15 pm, NEC Front Row		at Sacred Heart	W 85–75	1–4	William H. Pitt Center (443); Fairfield, CT
November 27, 2022*; 2:00 pm, ESPN+		Wagner	L 57–62	1–5	Wellness and Events Center (316); Newark, NJ
November 30, 2022*; 7:00 pm, ESPN+		at Cincinnati	L 60–86	1–6	Fifth Third Arena (8,769); Cincinnati, OH
December 3, 2022*; 2:00 pm, ESPN3		Bucknell	L 63–79	1–7	Wellness and Events Center (299); Newark, NJ
December 7, 2022*; 7:00 pm, ESPN+		at Army	L 62–63	1–8	Christl Arena (510); West Point, NY
December 11, 2022*; 2:00 pm, NEC Front Row		at Fairleigh Dickinson	L 71–73	1–9	Rothman Center (437); Hackensack, NJ
December 18, 2022*; 2:00 pm, ESPN+		Niagara	W 62–53	2–9	Wellness and Events Center (229); Newark, NJ
December 22, 2022*; 7:00 pm, ESPN+		at South Florida	L 73–92	2–10	Yuengling Center (2,026); Tampa, FL
December 27, 2022*; 7:00 pm, ESPN+		Saint Elizabeth	W 79–51	3–10	Wellness and Events Center (188); Newark, NJ
America East regular season
December 31, 2022; 2:00 pm, ESPN3		UMass Lowell	L 64–67	3–11 (0–1)	Wellness and Events Center (222); Newark, NJ
January 8, 2023; 2:00 pm, ESPN+		at Maine	W 91–83 ^{OT}	4–11 (1–1)	Memorial Gymnasium (835); Orono, ME
January 11, 2023; 7:00 pm, ESPN+		Binghamton	L 71–72 ^{OT}	4–12 (1–2)	Wellness and Events Center (411); Newark, NJ
January 14, 2023; 4:00 pm, ESPN3		Albany	W 74–67	5–12 (2–2)	Wellness and Events Center (711); Newark, NJ
January 19, 2023; 7:00 pm, ESPN+		at Bryant	L 75–87	5–13 (2–3)	Chace Athletic Center (777); Smithfield, RI
January 22, 2023; 1:00 pm, ESPN+		at Vermont	L 69–85	5–14 (2–4)	Patrick Gym (2,321); Burlington, VT
January 25, 2023; 7:00 pm, ESPN+		UMBC	W 69–65	6–14 (3–4)	Wellness and Events Center (411); Newark, NJ
February 1, 2023; 7:00 pm, ESPN+		New Hampshire	L 67–74 ^{OT}	6–15 (3–5)	Wellness and Events Center (416); Newark, NJ
February 4, 2023; 1:00 pm, ESPN3		at UMass Lowell	L 61–90	6–16 (3–6)	Costello Athletic Center (527); Lowell, MA
February 8, 2023; 7:00 pm, ESPN+		at UMBC	L 63–72	6–17 (3–7)	Chesapeake Employers Insurance Arena (1,422); Catonsville, MD
February 11, 2023; 4:00 pm, ESPN3		Maine	W 65–50	7–17 (4–7)	Wellness and Events Center (489); Newark, NJ
February 15, 2023; 7:00 pm, ESPN+		at Binghamton	L 67–86	7–18 (4–8)	Binghamton University Events Center (2,082); Vestal, NY
February 18, 2023; 7:00 pm, ESPN3		Vermont	L 80–82 ^{OT}	7–19 (4–9)	Wellness and Events Center (708); Newark, NJ
February 22, 2023; 7:00 pm, ESPN+		Bryant	L 78–79	7–20 (4–10)	Wellness and Events Center (932); Newark, NJ
February 25, 2023; 7:00 pm, ESPN3		at Albany	L 68–82	7–21 (4–11)	McDonough Sports Complex (1,253); Troy, NY
February 28, 2023; 7:00 pm, ESPN+		at New Hampshire	L 58–59	7–22 (4–12)	Lundholm Gym (511); Durham, NH
America East tournament
March 4, 2023; 7:00 pm, ESPN+	(8)	at (1) Vermont; Quarterfinals	L 57–84	7–23	Patrick Gym (2,420); Burlington, VT
*Non-conference game. ^{#}Rankings from AP Poll. (#) Tournament seedings in parentheses. All times are in Eastern.
