= 2022–23 New Hampshire Wildcats men's basketball team =

American college basketball season

2022–23 New Hampshire Wildcats men's basketball
- Conference: America East Conference
- Record: 15–15 (9–7 America East)
- Head coach: Bill Herrion (18th season)
- Associate head coach: Chris Mohr
- Assistant coaches: Ryan Herrion; Tyrece Gibbs
- Home arena: Lundholm Gym

2022–23 America East Conference men's basketball standings
	Conf.				Overall
Team	W		L	PCT	W		L	PCT
Vermont †	14	–	2	.875	23	–	11	.676
UMass Lowell	11	–	5	.688	26	–	8	.765
New Hampshire	9	–	7	.563	15	–	15	.500
UMBC	8	–	8	.500	18	–	14	.563
Binghamton	8	–	8	.500	13	–	18	.419
Bryant	8	–	8	.500	17	–	13	.567
Maine	7	–	9	.438	13	–	17	.433
NJIT	4	–	12	.250	7	–	23	.233
Albany	3	–	13	.188	8	–	23	.258
† 2023 AmEast Tournament winner

The 2022–23 New Hampshire Wildcats men's basketball team represented the University of New Hampshire in the 2022–23 NCAA Division I men's basketball season. The Wildcats, led by 18th-year head coach Bill Herrion, played their home games at the Lundholm Gym in Durham, New Hampshire as members of the America East Conference.

They finished the season 15–15, 9–7 in America East play, to finish in third place. They defeated Bryant in the quarterfinals of the America East tournament before losing to UMass Lowell in the semifinals.

== Previous season ==
The Wildcats finished the 2021–22 season 15–13, 10–8 in America East play, to finish a tie for second place. They lost in the quarterfinals of the America East tournament to Binghamton.

== Roster ==
2022–23 New Hampshire Wildcats men's basketball team
Players
Coaches

Pos.	#	Name	Height	Weight	Year	Previous school	Hometown
G	0	Jon Willeman	6 ft 2 in (1.88 m)	170 lb (77 kg)	Jr	Lebanon High School	Lebanon, NH
G	1	Rex Sunderland	6 ft 4 in (1.93 m)	190 lb (86 kg)	Fr	Davis High School	Kaysville, UT
F	3	Jaxson Baker	6 ft 8 in (2.03 m)	200 lb (91 kg)	GS	Central Arkansas	Phoenix, AZ
G	4	Nazim Derry	6 ft 2 in (1.88 m)	160 lb (73 kg)	GS	Goldey–Beacom College	Atlantic City, NJ
G	5	Kyree Brown	6 ft 0 in (1.83 m)	170 lb (77 kg)	Jr	Seattle	Oakland, CA
G	10	Nick Johnson	6 ft 4 in (1.93 m)	200 lb (91 kg)	Jr	All Hallows High School	The Bronx, NY
G	11	Christian Moore	6 ft 1 in (1.85 m)	175 lb (79 kg)	Fr	Hargrave Military Academy	Virginia Beach, VA
F	12	Promise Opurum	6 ft 7 in (2.01 m)	215 lb (98 kg)	Fr	Woodstock Academy	New Rochelle, NY
G	13	Matt Herasme	6 ft 4 in (1.93 m)	195 lb (88 kg)	GS	Marist	Chester, NY
G	14	A.J. Lopez	6 ft 5 in (1.96 m)	170 lb (77 kg)	RS Fr	Mount Zion Prep	Queens, NY
F	21	Clarence Daniels	6 ft 6 in (1.98 m)	225 lb (102 kg)	Jr	Lake Region State College	Brooklyn Park, MN
F	23	Ridvan Tutić	6 ft 10 in (2.08 m)	230 lb (104 kg)	Fr	Stari Ras	Novi Pazar, Serbia
F	33	Trey Woodyard	6 ft 6 in (1.98 m)	190 lb (86 kg)	So	Valparaiso	London, OH

Head coach

- Bill Herrion (Merrimack)

Assistant coach(es)

- Chris Mohr (Merrimack)
- Ryan Herrion (New Hampshire)
- Tyrece Gibbs (New Hampshire)

Legend

- (C) Team captain
- (S) Suspended
- (I) Ineligible
- (W) Walk-on
- Injured
- Current redshirt

Roster
Last update: November 26, 2022

== Schedule and results ==
Date time, TV	Rank^{#}	Opponent^{#}	Result	Record	Site (attendance) city, state
Non-conference regular season
November 7, 2022*; 7:30 p.m., ESPN3		Brandeis	W 79–47	1–0	Lundholm Gym (676); Durham, NH
November 11, 2022*; 7:00 p.m., ESPN3		Fairfield	W 83–71	2–0	Lundholm Gym (682); Durham, NH
November 15, 2022*; 7:00 p.m., ESPN+/SNY		at Fordham	L 61–79	2–1	Rose Hill Gymnasium (415); New York, NY
November 20, 2022*; 1:00 p.m., ESPN+		Boston University	L 57–64	2–2	Lundholm Gym (634); Durham, NH
November 26, 2022*; 2:00 p.m., ESPN+/NBCSWA		at George Washington	L 54–75	2–3	Charles E. Smith Center (703); Washington, D.C.
November 30, 2022*; 7:00 p.m., ESPN+		Sacred Heart	L 61–66	2–4	Lundholm Gym (369); Durham, NH
December 3, 2022*; 4:00 p.m., ESPN+		at Columbia	L 52–56	2–5	Levien Gymnasium (549); New York, NY
December 6, 2022*; 7:00 p.m., ACCNX/ESPN+		at Boston College	W 74–71 ^{OT}	3–5	Conte Forum (3,259); Chestnut Hill, MA
December 10, 2022*; 6:00 p.m., FS2		at St. John's	L 51–64	3–6	Carnesecca Arena (3,937); Queens, NY
December 12, 2022*; 7:00 p.m., ESPN+		Saint Joseph's (ME)	W 104–61	4–6	Lundholm Gym (390); Durham, NH
December 19, 2022*; 7:00 p.m., ESPN+		Holy Cross	W 78–60	5–6	Lundholm Gym (460); Durham, NH
December 21, 2022*; 7:00 p.m., ESPN+		at Brown	L 51–67	5–7	Pizzitola Sports Center (548); Providence, RI
December 29, 2022*; 7:00 p.m., ESPN+		at Dartmouth	Postponed		Leede Arena; Hanover, NH
America East regular season
December 31, 2022; 12:00 p.m., ESPN3		at Albany	W 67–51	6–7 (1–0)	McDonough Sports Complex (1,381); Troy, NY
January 5, 2023; 7:00 p.m., ESPN+		at Binghamton	L 50–68	6–8 (1–1)	Binghamton University Events Center (1,296); Vestal, NY
January 8, 2023; 12:00 p.m., ESPN+		Vermont	W 67–60	7–8 (2–1)	Lundholm Gym (664); Durham, NH
January 11, 2023; 7:00 p.m., ESPN+		at Maine	W 71–58	8–8 (3–1)	Cross Insurance Center (772); Bangor, ME
January 14, 2023; 1:00 p.m., ESPN3		Bryant	L 81–87	8–9 (3–2)	Lundholm Gym (650); Durham, NH
January 21, 2023; 1:00 p.m., ESPN+		at UMBC	L 69–80	8–10 (3–3)	Chesapeake Employers Insurance Arena (1,375); Catonsville, MD
January 25, 2023; 7:00 p.m., ESPN+		Albany	W 84–65	9–10 (4–3)	Lundholm Gym (535); Durham, NH
January 28, 2023; 1:00 p.m., ESPN3		UMass Lowell	W 69–65	10–10 (5–3)	Lundholm Gym (804); Durham, NH
February 1, 2023; 7:00 p.m., ESPN+		at NJIT	W 74–67 ^{OT}	11–10 (6–3)	Wellness and Events Center (416); Newark, NJ
February 4, 2023; 1:00 p.m., ESPN3		at Bryant	L 46–70	11–11 (6–4)	Chace Athletic Center (1,405); Smithfield, RI
February 8, 2023; 7:00 p.m., ESPN+		Binghamton	L 64–66	11–12 (6–5)	Lundholm Gym (519); Durham, NH
February 15, 2023; 7:00 p.m., ESPN+		at Vermont	L 51–80	11–13 (6–6)	Patrick Gym (2,220); Burlington, VT
February 18, 2023; 1:00 p.m., ESPN3		UMBC	W 75–66	12–13 (7–6)	Lundholm Gym (1,615); Durham, NH
February 22, 2023; 7:00 p.m., ESPN+		Maine	W 74–62	13–13 (8–6)	Lundholm Gym (611); Durham, NH
February 25, 2023; 5:00 p.m., ESPN3		at UMass Lowell	L 55–92	13–14 (8–7)	Tsongas Center (4,114); Lowell, MA
February 28, 2023; 7:00 p.m., ESPN+		NJIT	W 59–58	14–14 (9–7)	Lundholm Gym (511); Durham, NH
America East tournament
March 4, 2023; 1:00 p.m., ESPN+	(3)	(6) Bryant; Quarterfinals	W 67–60	15–14	Lundholm Gym (678); Durham, NH
March 7, 2023; 6:00 p.m., ESPN+	(3)	at (2) UMass Lowell; Semifinals	L 64–75	15–15	Costello Athletic Center (856); Lowell, MA
*Non-conference game. ^{#}Rankings from AP poll. (#) Tournament seedings in parentheses. All times are in Eastern.
