= 2022–23 Vermont Catamounts men's basketball team =

American college basketball season

2022–23 Vermont Catamounts men's basketball

America East regular season and tournament champions

NCAA tournament, First Round
- Conference: America East Conference
- Record: 23–11 (14–2 America East)
- Head coach: John Becker (12th season)
- Associate head coach: Ryan Schneider
- Assistant coaches: Bryson Johnson; Chris Santo
- Home arena: Patrick Gym

2022–23 America East Conference men's basketball standings
	Conf.				Overall
Team	W		L	PCT	W		L	PCT
Vermont †	14	–	2	.875	23	–	11	.676
UMass Lowell	11	–	5	.688	26	–	8	.765
New Hampshire	9	–	7	.563	15	–	15	.500
UMBC	8	–	8	.500	18	–	14	.563
Binghamton	8	–	8	.500	13	–	18	.419
Bryant	8	–	8	.500	17	–	13	.567
Maine	7	–	9	.438	13	–	17	.433
NJIT	4	–	12	.250	7	–	23	.233
Albany	3	–	13	.188	8	–	23	.258
† 2023 AmEast Tournament winner

The 2022–23 Vermont Catamounts men's basketball team represented the University of Vermont in the 2022–23 NCAA Division I men's basketball season. The Catamounts, led by 12th-year head coach John Becker, played their home games at the Patrick Gym in Burlington, Vermont as members of the America East Conference. They finished the season 23–11, 14–2 in America East play to win the regular season championship. They defeated NJIT, Binghamton, and UMass Lowell to win the America East tournament championship. As a result, they received the conference's automatic bid to the NCAA tournament as the No. 15 seed in the East region. There they lost to Marquette.

== Previous season ==
The Catamounts finished the 2021–22 season 28–6, 17–1 in America East play to finish as regular season champions. They defeated NJIT, Binghamton, and UMBC to win the America East tournament. As a result, they received the conference's automatic bid to the NCAA tournament as the No. 13 seed in the West Region, where they lost in the first round to Arkansas.

This was to be the team's last season at Patrick Gym, but their new arena, Tarrant Event Center, was put on indefinite hold, due to a combination of the COVID-19 pandemic and rising borrowing costs.

== Roster ==
2022–23 Vermont Catamounts men's basketball team
Players
Coaches

Pos.	#	Name	Height	Weight	Year	Previous school	Hometown
F	0	Ileri Ayo-Faleye	6 ft 8 in (2.03 m)	210 lb (95 kg)	RS So	Rhode Island	Lebanon, PA
G	1	Aaron Deloney	6 ft 0 in (1.83 m)	165 lb (75 kg)	Sr	Grant High School	Portland, OR
G	2	Sam Alamutu	6 ft 5 in (1.96 m)	215 lb (98 kg)	RS Fr	Rothesay Netherwood School	Ajax, ON
G	3	TJ Hurley	6 ft 5 in (1.96 m)	190 lb (86 kg)	Fr	The Rock School	Pelham, ON
G	4	Kam Gibson	6 ft 3 in (1.91 m)	190 lb (86 kg)	Sr	Western Carolina	Cincinnati, OH
F	12	Perry Smith Jr.	6 ft 9 in (2.06 m)	225 lb (102 kg)	Fr	Legacy Early College	Augusta, GA
G	13	Dylan Penn	6 ft 3 in (1.91 m)	195 lb (88 kg)	Sr	Bellarmine	Evansville, IN
F	14	Jackson Skipper (redshirt)	6 ft 7 in (2.01 m)	170 lb (77 kg)	Fr	Link Year Prep	Tulsa, OK
G	15	Finn Sullivan	6 ft 4 in (1.93 m)	195 lb (88 kg)	Sr	San Diego	San Diego, CA
F	24	Matt Veretto	6 ft 8 in (2.03 m)	220 lb (100 kg)	GS	Delaware	South Windsor, CT
G	25	Michel Ndayishimiye (W)	5 ft 10 in (1.78 m)	180 lb (82 kg)	RS Fr	Rice Memorial High School	Burlington, VT
F	32	Nick Fiorillo	6 ft 8 in (2.03 m)	225 lb (102 kg)	RS Jr	Scarborough High School	Scarborough, ME
F	35	Jorge Ochoa	6 ft 7 in (2.01 m)	225 lb (102 kg)	Fr	Veritas Training Academy	Los Angeles, CA
G	55	Robin Duncan	6 ft 5 in (1.96 m)	190 lb (86 kg)	Sr	Evansville Harrison High School	Evansville, IN
F		Duncan Demuth	6 ft 8 in (2.03 m)	210 lb (95 kg)	Sr	Oklahoma State	Seminole, FL

Head coach

- John Becker (Catholic)

Assistant coach(es)

- Ryan Schneider (Marist)
- Bryson Johnson (Bucknell)
- Chris Santo (Saint Anselm)

Legend

- (C) Team captain
- (S) Suspended
- (I) Ineligible
- (W) Walk-on
- Injured
- Current redshirt

Roster
Last update: November 21, 2022

== Schedule and results ==
Date time, TV	Rank^{#}	Opponent^{#}	Result	Record	Site (attendance) city, state
Exhibition
October 29, 2022*; 7:00 pm		Saint Michael's	W 78–58	–	Patrick Gym (2,245); Burlington, VT
November 2, 2022*; 7:00 pm		Middlebury	W 79–62	–	Patrick Gym (1,939); Burlington, VT
Non-conference regular season
November 7, 2022*; 7:00 pm, ESPN+		Brown	W 80–65	1–0	Patrick Gym (2,296); Burlington, VT
November 10, 2022*; 10:00 pm, WCC Network		at Saint Mary's	L 53–79	1–1	University Credit Union Pavilion (3,027); Moraga, CA
November 13, 2022*; 8:00 pm, ESPN+		at Cal State Fullerton	L 85–94 ^{2OT}	1–2	Titan Gym (900); Fullerton, CA
November 15, 2022*; 11:00 pm, P12N		at USC	L 57–59	1–3	Galen Center (1,838); Los Angeles, CA
November 18, 2022*; 7:30 pm, ESPN+		vs. Iona; Basketball Hall of Fame Showcase	L 50–71	1–4	Mohegan Sun Arena; Uncasville, CT
November 22, 2022*; 7:00 pm, ESPN+		at Yale	L 44–73	1–5	John J. Lee Amphitheater (678); New Haven, CT
November 25, 2022*; 12:00 pm, FloHoops		vs. Ball State; Nassau Championship First Round	W 78–73	2–5	Baha Mar Convention Center (267); Nassau, Bahamas
November 26, 2022*; 5:30 p.m., FloHoops		vs. UNC Wilmington; Nassau Championship seminfinals	L 66–68	2–6	Baha Mar Convention Center (311); Nassau, Bahamas
November 27, 2022*; 5:30 p.m., FloHoops		vs. Long Beach State; Nassau Championship 3rd place game	L 58–78	2–7	Baha Mar Convention Center (278); Nassau, Bahamas
December 1, 2022*; 7:00 pm, ESPN+		NVU–Lyndon	W 101–63	3–7	Patrick Gym (2,007); Burlington, VT
December 4, 2022*; 2:00 pm, ESPN+		at Merrimack	W 66–43	4–7	Lawler Arena (1,727); North Andover, MA
December 6, 2022*; 7:00 pm, ESPN+		at Dartmouth	W 68–52	5–7	Leede Arena (590); Hanover, NH
December 10, 2022*; 12:00 pm, ESPN+		at Colgate	W 73–72	6–7	Cotterell Court (975); Hamilton, NY
December 20, 2022*; 2:00 pm, ESPN+		Toledo	L 72–84	6–8	Patrick Gym (1,879); Burlington, VT
America East Conference regular season
January 1, 2023; 1:00 pm, ESPN+		at UMBC	W 74–61	7–8 (1–0)	Chesapeake Employers Insurance Arena (1,535); Catonsville, MD
January 5, 2023; 7:00 pm, ESPNU		Bryant	W 74–64	8–8 (2–0)	Patrick Gym (2,304); Burlington, VT
January 8, 2023; 12:00 pm, ESPN+		at New Hampshire	L 60–67	8–9 (2–1)	Lundholm Gym (664); Durham, NH
January 11, 2023; 6:00 pm, ESPN+		at UMass Lowell	L 65–80	8–10 (2–2)	Costello Athletic Center (517); Lowell, MA
January 19, 2023; 7:00 pm, ESPN+		Maine	W 66–45	9–10 (3–2)	Patrick Gym (2,377); Burlington, VT
January 22, 2023; 1:00 pm, ESPN+/NESN		NJIT	W 85–69	10–10 (4–2)	Patrick Gym (2,321); Burlington, VT
January 25, 2023; 7:00 pm, ESPN+		at Binghamton	W 80–55	11–10 (5–2)	Binghamton University Events Center (3,570); Vestal, NY
January 28, 2023; 12:00 pm, ESPN+		UMBC	W 74–68	12–10 (6–2)	Patrick Gym (2,418); Burlington, VT
February 4, 2023; 3:00 pm, ESPN+		at Albany	W 87–68	13–10 (7–2)	McDonough Sports Complex (2,014); Troy, NY
February 8, 2023; 7:00 pm, ESPN+		at Maine	W 74–65	14–10 (8–2)	Cross Insurance Center (785); Bangor, ME
February 11, 2023; 7:00 pm, ESPN3		UMass Lowell	W 93–81	15–10 (9–2)	Patrick Gym (2,737); Burlington, VT
February 15, 2023; 7:00 pm, ESPN+		New Hampshire	W 80–51	16–10 (10–2)	Patrick Gym (2,220); Burlington, VT
February 18, 2023; 7:00 pm, ESPN3		at NJIT	W 82–80 ^{OT}	17–10 (11–2)	Wellness and Events Center (708); Newark, NJ
February 22, 2023; 7:00 pm, ESPN+		Binghamton	W 81–70	18–10 (12–2)	Patrick Gym (2,299); Burlington, VT
February 25, 2023; 7:00 pm, ESPN+		at Bryant	W 70–66	19–10 (13–2)	Chace Athletic Center (1,600); Smithfield, RI
February 28, 2023; 7:00 pm, ESPN+		Albany	W 79–61	20–10 (14–2)	Patrick Gym (2,510); Burlington, VT
America East tournament
March 4, 2023; 7:00 pm, ESPN+	(1)	(8) NJIT; Quarterfinals	W 84–57	21–10	Patrick Gym (2,420); Burlington, VT
March 7, 2023; 7:00 pm, ESPN+	(1)	(5) Binghamton; Semifinals	W 79–57	22–10	Patrick Gym (2,451); Burlington, VT
March 11, 2023; 11:00 am, ESPN2/ESPN+	(1)	(2) UMass Lowell; Championship	W 72–59	23–10	Patrick Gym; Burlington, VT
NCAA tournament
March 17, 2023*; 2:45 pm, CBS	(15 E)	vs. (2 E) No. 6 Marquette; First Round	L 61–78	23–11	Nationwide Arena (19,564); Columbus, OH
*Non-conference game. ^{#}Rankings from AP Poll. (#) Tournament seedings in parentheses. E=East. All times are in Eastern.
