= 2022–23 Albany Great Danes men's basketball team =

American college basketball season

2022–23 Albany Great Danes men's basketball
- Conference: America East Conference
- Record: 8–23 (3–13 America East)
- Head coach: Dwayne Killings (2nd season)
- Assistant coaches: Dan Madhavapallil; Bobby Jordan; Ryan Daly
- Home arena: McDonough Sports Complex

2022–23 America East Conference men's basketball standings
	Conf.				Overall
Team	W		L	PCT	W		L	PCT
Vermont †	14	–	2	.875	23	–	11	.676
UMass Lowell	11	–	5	.688	26	–	8	.765
New Hampshire	9	–	7	.563	15	–	15	.500
UMBC	8	–	8	.500	18	–	14	.563
Binghamton	8	–	8	.500	13	–	18	.419
Bryant	8	–	8	.500	17	–	13	.567
Maine	7	–	9	.438	13	–	17	.433
NJIT	4	–	12	.250	7	–	23	.233
Albany	3	–	13	.188	8	–	23	.258
† 2023 AmEast Tournament winner

The 2022–23 Albany Great Danes men's basketball team represented the University at Albany, SUNY in the 2022–23 NCAA Division I men's basketball season. As members of the America East Conference, they played their home games at the McDonough Sports Complex in Troy, New York due to the ongoing renovations of SEFCU Arena on the main campus. They were led by second-year head coach Dwayne Killings. They finished the season 8–23, 3–13 in America East play, to finish in last place. They failed to qualify for the America East tournament.

== Previous season ==
The Great Danes finished the 2021–22 season 13–18, 9–9 in America East play, to finish in a tie for fifth place. They lost in the quarterfinals of the America East tournament to Hartford.

== Roster ==
2022–23 Albany Great Danes men's basketball team
Players
Coaches

Pos.	#	Name	Height	Weight	Year	Previous school	Hometown
G	0	Ny'Mire Little	6 ft 4 in (1.93 m)	205 lb (93 kg)	So	Westtown School	Chester, PA
F	1	Gerald Drumgoole	6 ft 5 in (1.96 m)	205 lb (93 kg)	Sr	Pittsburgh	Rochester, NY
G	2	Da'Kquan Davis	6 ft 1 in (1.85 m)	175 lb (79 kg)	GS	Arcadia	Philadelphia, PA
F	3	Trey Hutcheson	6 ft 5 in (1.96 m)	200 lb (91 kg)	Sr	Linn-Mar HS	Marion, IA
G	4	Malik Edmead	5 ft 10 in (1.78 m)	170 lb (77 kg)	Jr	Merrimack	Deer Park, NY
F	10	Aaron Reddish	6 ft 7 in (2.01 m)	195 lb (88 kg)	So	Pebblebrook HS	Norristown, PA
F	11	Tairi Ketner	6 ft 7 in (2.01 m)	260 lb (118 kg)	So	Woodstock Academy	South Philadelphia, PA
F	12	Justin Neely	6 ft 6 in (1.98 m)	210 lb (95 kg)	So	West Oaks Academy	Miami, FL
G	13	Sarju Patel	6 ft 3 in (1.91 m)	173 lb (78 kg)	GS	Cornell	Daleville, VA
F	14	Japannah III Kellogg	6 ft 8 in (2.03 m)	200 lb (91 kg)	Jr	Green Bay	Ames, IA
F	15	Jonathan Beagle	6 ft 9 in (2.06 m)	240 lb (109 kg)	Fr	St. Thomas More School	Hudson Falls, NY
G	22	Will Amica	6 ft 0 in (1.83 m)	170 lb (77 kg)	So	West Genesee HS	Syracuse, NY
G	44	Marcus Jackson	6 ft 2 in (1.88 m)	180 lb (82 kg)	Fr	Cushing Academy	Amsterdam, NY

Head coach

- Dwayne Killings (Hampton)

Assistant coach(es)

- Dan Madhavapallil (Marquette)
- Bobby Jordan (Drexel)
- Ryan Daly (Saint Joseph's)

Legend

- (C) Team captain
- (S) Suspended
- (I) Ineligible
- (W) Walk-on
- Injured
- Current redshirt

Roster
Last update: October 23, 2022

== Schedule and results ==
Date time, TV	Rank^{#}	Opponent^{#}	Result	Record	Site (attendance) city, state
Exhibition
October 30, 2022*; 3:00 p.m.		Skidmore	W 71–69		McDonough Sports Complex (200); Troy, NY
November 2, 2022*; 7:00 p.m.		at Saint Rose	W 73–66		Daniel P. Nolan Gymnasium; Albany, NY
Non-conference regular season
November 7, 2022*; 7:00 p.m., FloHoops		at Towson	L 62–67	0–1	SECU Arena (3,242); Towson, MD
November 8, 2022*; 5:00 p.m.		at Immaculata	W 74–47	1–1	Alumnae Hall (491); Malvern, PA
November 12, 2022*; 7:30 p.m., ESPN3		at Siena; Rivalry	L 62–75	1–2	MVP Arena (9,561); Albany, NY
November 14, 2022*; 7:00 p.m., ESPN+		Union	W 87–75	2–2	McDonough Sports Complex (1,139); Troy, NY
November 17, 2022*; 7:00 p.m., ESPN+		at Saint Joseph's; Sunshine Slam campus game	L 79–99	2–3	Hagan Arena (1,452); Philadelphia, PA
November 21, 2022*; 12:00 p.m., FloHoops		vs. Austin Peay; Sunshine Slam semifinals	L 59–74	2–4	Ocean Center; Daytona Beach, FL
November 22, 2022*; 12:00 p.m., FloHoops		vs. Presbyterian; Sunshine Slam consolation	W 68–65	3–4	Ocean Center (1,417); Daytona Beach, FL
November 26, 2022*; 3:00 p.m., ESPN+		Florida Atlantic	L 56–73	3–5	McDonough Sports Complex (1,093); Troy, NY
November 29, 2022*; 7:00 p.m., ESPN+		at American	L 62–88	3–6	Bender Arena (1,009); Washington, D.C.
December 5, 2022*; 7:00 p.m., ESPN+		at UMass	L 73–87	3–7	Mullins Center (3,174); Amherst, MA
December 10, 2022*; 2:00 p.m., FS1		at Providence	L 55–93	3–8	Amica Mutual Pavilion (8,229); Providence, RI
December 14, 2022*; 7:00 p.m., ESPN+		LIU	W 76–59	4–8	McDonough Sports Complex (907); Troy, NY
December 18, 2022*; 2:00 p.m., ESPN+		at Loyola–Chicago	L 56–68	4–9	Joseph J. Gentile Arena (3,162); Chicago, IL
December 20, 2022*; 2:00 p.m., ESPN+		at Northern Illinois	W 83–78	5–9	Convocation Center (506); DeKalb, IL
December 28, 2022*; 6:00 p.m., ACCN		at No. 13 Virginia	L 46–66	5–10	John Paul Jones Arena (14,269); Charlottesville, VA
America East Conference regular season
December 31, 2022; 12:00 p.m., ESPN3		New Hampshire	L 51–67	5–11 (0–1)	McDonough Sports Complex (1,381); Troy, NY
January 5, 2023; 7:00 p.m., ESPN+		at UMBC	L 83–92	5–12 (0–2)	Chesapeake Employers Insurance Arena (1,075); Catonsville, MD
January 8, 2023; 3:00 p.m., ESPN+		UMass Lowell	W 89–63	6–12 (1–3)	McDonough Sports Complex (1,308); Troy, NY
January 11, 2023; 7:00 p.m., ESPN+		at Bryant	L 69–86	6–13 (1–3)	Chace Athletic Center (669); Smithfield, RI
January 14, 2023; 7:00 p.m., ESPN3		at NJIT	L 67–74	6–14 (1–4)	Wellness and Events Center (711); Newark, NJ
January 19, 2023; 7:00 p.m., ESPN+		Binghamton	L 54–65	6–15 (1–5)	McDonough Sports Complex (1,161); Troy, NY
January 25, 2023; 7:00 p.m., ESPN+		at New Hampshire	L 65–84	6–16 (1–6)	Lundholm Gym (535); Durham, NH
January 28, 2023; 7:00 p.m., ESPN3		Maine	L 68–72	6–17 (1–7)	McDonough Sports Complex (1,305); Troy, NY
February 1, 2023; 6:00 p.m., ESPN+		at UMass Lowell	L 50–66	6–18 (1–8)	Costello Athletic Center (811); Lowell, MA
February 4, 2023; 3:00 p.m., ESPN+		Vermont	L 68–87	6–19 (1–9)	McDonough Sports Complex (2,014); Troy, NY
February 8, 2023; 7:00 p.m., ESPN+		Bryant	L 62–87	6–20 (1–10)	McDonough Sports Complex (1,054); Troy, NY
February 11, 2023; 2:00 p.m., ESPN+		at Binghamton	L 66–80 ^{OT}	6–21 (1–11)	Binghamton University Events Center (2,746); Vestal, NY
February 15, 2023; 7:00 p.m., ESPN+		UMBC	W 81–74	7–21 (2–11)	McDonough Sports Complex (1,104); Troy, NY
February 18, 2023; 2:00 p.m., ESPN3		at Maine	L 72–74	7–22 (2–12)	Memorial Gymnasium (907); Orono, ME
February 25, 2023; 7:00 p.m., ESPN3		NJIT	W 82–68	8–22 (3–12)	McDonough Sports Complex (1,253); Troy, NY
February 28, 2023; 7:00 p.m., ESPN+		at Vermont	L 61–79	8–23 (3–13)	Patrick Gym (2,510); Burlington, VT
*Non-conference game. ^{#}Rankings from AP poll. (#) Tournament seedings in parentheses. All times are in Eastern.
