= Earl Timberlake =

American basketball player (born 2000)

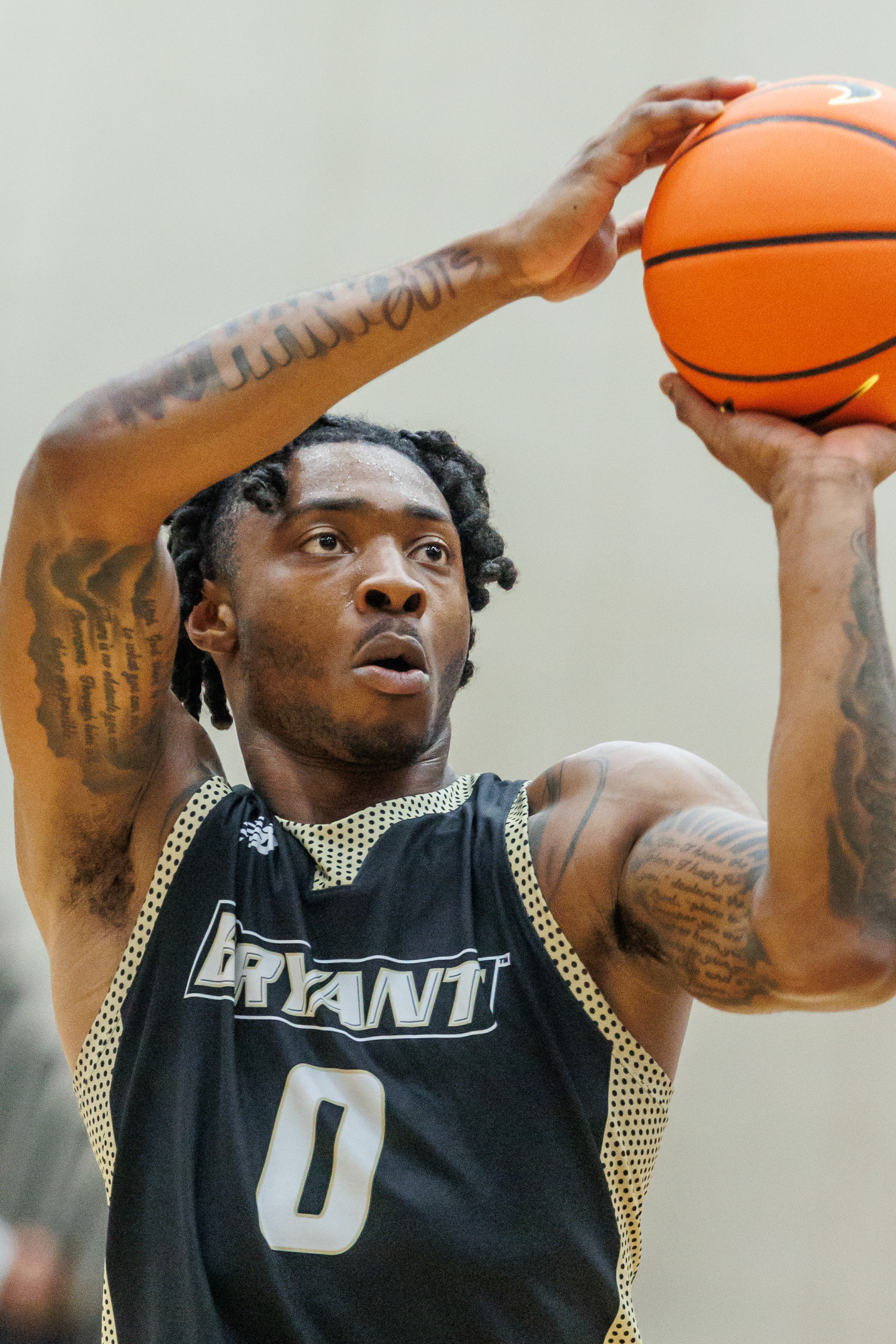
- Timberlake in 2023

No. 25 – Medi Bayreuth
- Position: Shooting guard
- League: ProA

Personal information
- Born: November 4, 2000 (age 26) Washington, D.C., U.S.
- Listed height: 6 ft 6 in (1.98 m)
- Listed weight: 225 lb (102 kg)

Career information
- High school: Rock Creek Christian Academy (Rosaryville, Maryland); DeMatha Catholic (Hyattsville, Maryland)
- College: Miami (Florida) (2020–2021); Memphis (2021–2022); Bryant (2022–2025)
- NBA draft: 2025: undrafted
- Playing career: 2025–present

Career history
- 2025–2026: Oliveirense
- 2026–present: Medi Bayreuth

Career highlights
- America East Player of the Year (2025); 2× First-team All-America East (2024, 2025); Second-team All-America East (2023); America East All-Defensive team (2025)

Earl Anthony Timberlake Jr. (born November 4, 2000) is an American professional basketball player for Medi Bayreuth of the German ProA. He played college basketball for the Bryant Bulldogs, the Miami Hurricanes and the Memphis Tigers.

== Early life and high school career ==
Timberlake grew up in Southeast Washington, D.C. and began playing basketball in fourth grade. As a high school freshman, he played for Rock Creek Christian Academy in Rosaryville, Maryland. After averaging 8.3 points per game in his first season, he transferred to DeMatha Catholic High School in Hyattsville, Maryland. Timberlake averaged 11.3 points per game as a sophomore. In his senior season, he averaged 16.5 points and 10 rebounds per game, capturing his second Washington Catholic Athletic Conference (WCAC) title. He was a two-time first-team All-WCAC selection. In 2019, Timberlake competed for Team Durant at the Nike Elite Youth Basketball League.

=== Recruiting ===
Timberlake was a consensus four-star recruit and the highest-ranked player from Maryland in the 2020 class. On November 4, 2019, he committed to playing college basketball for Miami (FL) over offers from Georgetown, Ohio State, Alabama, Maryland, Providence, Wake Forest, North Carolina, Seton Hall, South Carolina and Pittsburgh. Timberlake became the program's best recruit since Lonnie Walker in the 2017 class.

College recruiting
Name	Hometown	School	Height	Weight	Commit date
Earl Timberlake; SG	Washington, D.C.	DeMatha Catholic (MD)	6 ft 6 in (1.98 m)	215 lb (98 kg)	Nov 4, 2019
Earl Timberlake; SG	Recruit ratings: Rivals: 247Sports: ESPN: (88)				
Overall recruit ranking: Rivals: 32 247Sports: 36 ESPN: 37
Note: In many cases, Scout, Rivals, 247Sports, On3, and ESPN may conflict in their listings of height and weight.; In these cases, the average was taken. ESPN grades are on a 100-point scale.; Sources: "Miami 2020 Basketball Commitments". Rivals.; "2020 Miami Hurricanes Recruiting Class". ESPN.; "2020 Team Ranking". Rivals.

== College career ==
As a freshman with the Miami Hurricanes, Timberlake was limited to seven games due to ankle and shoulder injuries. He averaged 9.3 points, five rebounds and 2.4 assists per game. For his sophomore season, he transferred to Memphis. Timberlake averaged 4.7 points and 3.4 rebounds per game. He transferred to Bryant for his junior season. Timberlake averaged 13.8 points and 8.5 rebounds per game.

Timberlake was named Kevin Roberson Player of the Year in 2025. He was named a finalist for the Lou Henson National Player of the Year award in March 2025. Coach Phil Martelli Jr. called Timberlake "the greatest player in Bryant history."

== Professional career ==
Following the close of his college career, Timberlake signed his first professional contract with Oliveirense of the Liga Portuguesa de Basquetebol (LPB). He averaged 15.5 points, 8.1 rebounds, 4.6 assists, 1.8 blocks and a steal per game.

== Career statistics ==
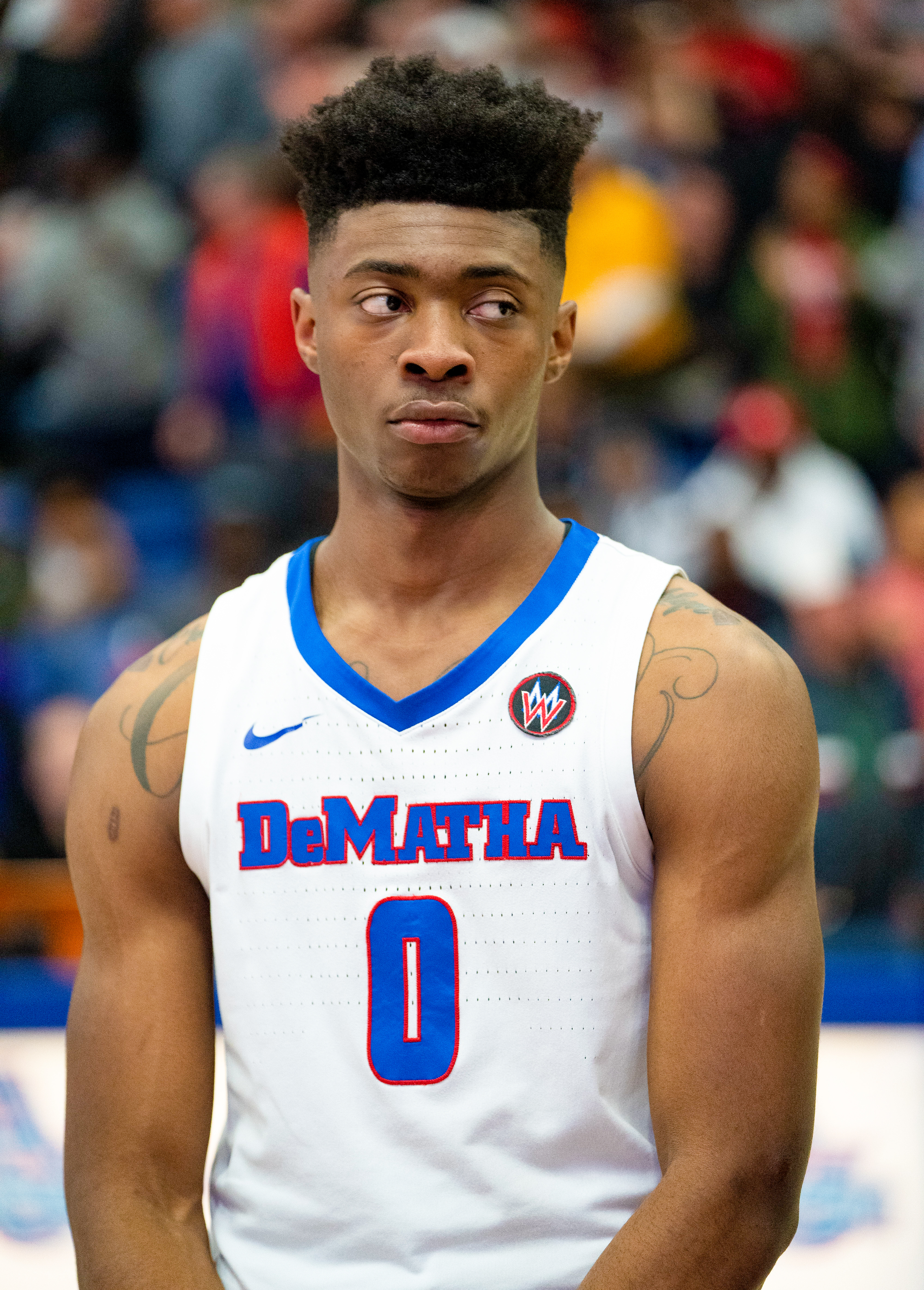
Timberlake with DeMatha Catholic in 2020

Legend
GP	Games played	GS	Games started	MPG	Minutes per game
FG%	Field goal percentage	3P%	3-point field goal percentage	FT%	Free throw percentage
RPG	Rebounds per game	APG	Assists per game	SPG	Steals per game
BPG	Blocks per game	PPG	Points per game	**Bold**	Career high

=== College ===
Year	Team	GP	GS	MPG	FG%	3P%	FT%	RPG	APG	SPG	BPG	PPG
2020–21	Miami	7	3	27.4	.449	.286	.704	5.0	2.4	**1.7**	**.6**	9.3
2021–22	Memphis	29	11	17.1	.468	.000	.585	3.4	1.6	.5	.5	4.7
2022–23	Bryant	28	26	32.6	.526	.200	.643	8.4	2.7	.9	.6	13.8
2023–24	Bryant	30	30	34.4	**.620**	.111	.603	**9.0**	3.9	1.3	1.3	14.6
2024–25	Bryant	**33**	**33**	**35.9**	.500	**.360**	**.713**	8.1	**4.7**	1.0	**1.8**	**15.5**
Career		127	103	30.1	.533	.246	.653	7.1	3.3	1.0	1.0	12.1

== Personal life ==
Timberlake is the son of Earl Timberlake Sr. and Taundaleah Nicole Stewart. He has two younger sisters, Christiana and Brooklyn.
