= 2022–23 Bryant Bulldogs men's basketball team =

American college basketball season

2022–23 Bryant Bulldogs men's basketball
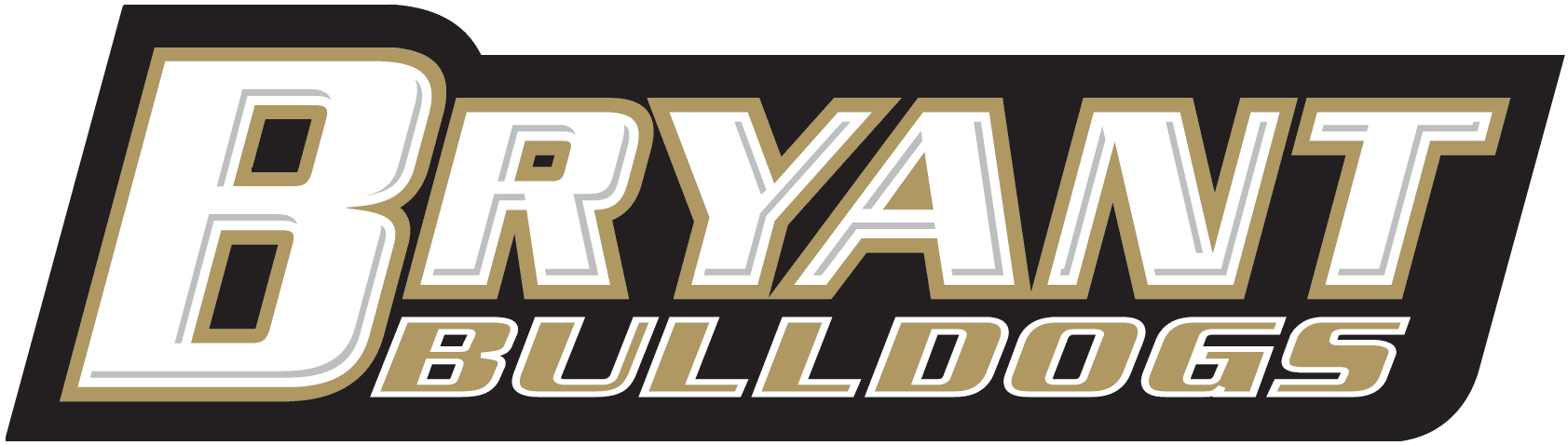
- Conference: America East Conference
- Record: 17–13 (8–8 America East)
- Head coach: Jared Grasso (5th season)
- Assistant coaches: Phil Martelli, Jr.; Chris Cole; Eamonn Mahar
- Home arena: Chace Athletic Center

2022–23 America East Conference men's basketball standings
	Conf.				Overall
Team	W		L	PCT	W		L	PCT
Vermont †	14	–	2	.875	23	–	11	.676
UMass Lowell	11	–	5	.688	26	–	8	.765
New Hampshire	9	–	7	.563	15	–	15	.500
UMBC	8	–	8	.500	18	–	14	.563
Binghamton	8	–	8	.500	13	–	18	.419
Bryant	8	–	8	.500	17	–	13	.567
Maine	7	–	9	.438	13	–	17	.433
NJIT	4	–	12	.250	7	–	23	.233
Albany	3	–	13	.188	8	–	23	.258
† 2023 AmEast Tournament winner

The 2022–23 Bryant Bulldogs men's basketball team represented Bryant University in the 2022–23 NCAA Division I men's basketball season. The Bulldogs, led by fifth-year head coach Jared Grasso, played their home games at the Chace Athletic Center in Smithfield, Rhode Island as members of the America East Conference. They finished the season 17-13, 8-8 in America East Play for a three-way-tie for 4th place. They lost in the quarterfinals of the America East Tournament to New Hampshire.

== Previous season ==
The Bulldogs finished the 2021–22 season 22–10, 16–2 in NEC play to win the regular season championship. They defeated Central Connecticut, Mount St. Mary's, and Wagner to win the NEC tournament championship. As a result, the Bulldogs received the conference's automatic bid to the NCAA Tournament, the school's first-ever trip to the tournament, where they lost to Wright State in the First Four.

== Roster ==
2022–23 Bryant Bulldogs men's basketball team
Players
Coaches

Pos.	#	Name	Height	Weight	Year	Hometown
G	0	Earl Timberlake	6 ft 6 in (1.98 m)	220 lb (100 kg)	Jr	Washington, D.C.
F	1	Antwan Walker	6 ft 8 in (2.03 m)	230 lb (104 kg)	Sr	Washington, D.C.
G	2	Erickson Bans	5 ft 11 in (1.8 m)	175 lb (79 kg)	Jr	Pawtucket, Rhode Island
G	3	Sherif Gross-Bullock	6 ft 5 in (1.96 m)	215 lb (98 kg)	Sr	Washington, D.C.
G	4	Tyler Brelsford	6 ft 4 in (1.93 m)	183 lb (83 kg)	So	Ellicott City, Maryland
G	5	Charles Pride	6 ft 4 in (1.93 m)	200 lb (91 kg)	Sr	Syracuse, New York
G	10	Todd Rochelle	6 ft 3 in (1.91 m)	185 lb (84 kg)	Fr	Queens, New York
G	11	Joe Moon IV	6 ft 2 in (1.88 m)	190 lb (86 kg)	Jr	Westland, Michigan
G	12	Timmy Kiggins	6 ft 0 in (1.83 m)	180 lb (82 kg)	Sr	Westbury, New York
F	13	Mike Marshall Jr.	6 ft 3 in (1.91 m)	185 lb (84 kg)	So	Weymouth, Massachusetts
F	15	John Shannon	6 ft 4 in (1.93 m)	200 lb (91 kg)	So	Milford, Connecticut
G	20	Miles Latimer	6 ft 6 in (1.98 m)	186 lb (84 kg)	Sr	Fairfax, Virginia
G	22	Chauncey Hawkins	5 ft 8 in (1.73 m)	172 lb (78 kg)	GS	Spring Valley, New York
F	23	Kvonn Cramer	6 ft 7 in (2.01 m)	225 lb (102 kg)	Jr	Wilmington, Delaware
F	24	Tay Mosher	6 ft 8 in (2.03 m)	215 lb (98 kg)	So	The Colony, Texas
G	25	Doug Edert	6 ft 2 in (1.88 m)	185 lb (84 kg)	Sr	Nutley, New Jersey
F	50	Josh Ozabor	6 ft 7 in (2.01 m)	220 lb (100 kg)	So	Johannesburg, South Africa

Head coach

- Jared Grasso (Quinnipiac)

Assistant coach(es)

- Phil Martelli, Jr. (Saint Joseph's)
- Chris Cole (New Mexico State)
- Eamonn Mahar (SUNY Cortland)

Legend

- (C) Team captain
- (S) Suspended
- (I) Ineligible
- (W) Walk-on
- Injured
- Current redshirt

Roster
Last update: October 26, 2022

== Schedule and results ==
Date time, TV	Rank^{#}	Opponent^{#}	Result	Record	Site (attendance) city, state
Non-conference regular season
November 7, 2022*; 7:00 pm, ESPN+		Thomas	W 147–39	1–0	Chace Athletic Center; Smithfield, RI
November 11, 2022*; 7:00 pm, ESPN+		at Dartmouth	W 89–70	2–0	Leede Arena (688); Hanover, NH
November 14, 2022*; 7:00 pm, ESPN+		UMaine Fort Kent	Cancelled due to opposing forfeit		Chace Athletic Center; Smithfield, RI
November 17, 2022*; 7:00 pm, CUSA.tv		at Florida Atlantic; Paradise Invitational	L 74–85	2–1	Eleanor R. Baldwin Arena (1,452); Boca Raton, FL
November 19, 2022*; 7:00 pm, ESPN+		at FIU	W 91–85	3–1	Ocean Bank Convocation Center (573); Miami, FL
November 21, 2022*; 12:00 pm		vs. Detroit Mercy; Paradise Invitational	W 98–88	4–1	Eleanor R. Baldwin Arena (105); Boca Raton, FL
November 26, 2022*; 7:00 pm, ESPN+		at Syracuse	W 73–72	5–1	JMA Wireless Dome (15,892); Syracuse, NY
November 28, 2022*; 7:00 pm, ESPN+		Framingham State	W 98–44	6–1	Chace Athletic Center (600); Smithfield, RI
December 2, 2022*; 6:00 pm, ESPN+		Brown	L 60–72	6–2	Chace Athletic Center (1,585); Smithfield, RI
December 4, 2022*; 12:00 pm, ESPN+		at Cincinnati	L 71–97	6–3	Fifth Third Arena (9,273); Cincinnati, OH
December 6, 2022*; 7:00 pm		at Tulane	Postponed due to health and safety protocols		Devlin Fieldhouse; New Orleans, LA
December 9, 2022*; 6:00 pm, ESPN+		Stony Brook	W 79–60	7–3	Chace Athletic Center (900); Smithfield, RI
December 11, 2022*; 2:00 pm, ESPN+		at Manhattan	W 104–97 ^{OT}	8–3	Draddy Gymnasium; Riverdale, NY
December 17, 2022*; 12:30 pm, ESPN+		vs. Liberty; Hall of Fame Classic	L 62–82	8–4	MassMutual Center; Springfield, MA
December 22, 2022*; 12:00 pm, ESPN+		Towson	W 69–59	9–4	Chace Athletic Center (985); Smithfield, RI
America East Conference regular season
December 31, 2022; 1:00 pm, ESPN+		Binghamton	W 82–78	10–4 (1–0)	Chace Athletic Center (1,050); Smithfield, RI
January 5, 2023; 7:00 pm, ESPNU		at Vermont	L 64–74	10–5 (1–1)	Patrick Gym (2,304); Burlington, VT
January 8, 2023; 1:00 pm, ESPN+		UMBC	L 73–81	10–6 (1–2)	Chace Athletic Center (750); Smithfield, RI
January 11, 2023; 7:00 pm, ESPN+		Albany	W 86–69	11–6 (2–2)	Chace Athletic Center (669); Smithfield, RI
January 14, 2023; 1:00 pm, ESPN3		at New Hampshire	W 87–81	12–6 (3–2)	Lundholm Gym (650); Durham, NH
January 19, 2023; 7:00 pm, ESPN+		NJIT	W 87–75	13–6 (4–2)	Chace Athletic Center (777); Smithfield, RI
January 22, 2023; 1:00 pm, ESPN+		at UMass Lowell	L 79–98	13–7 (4–3)	Costello Athletic Center (850); Lowell, MA
January 28, 2023; 2:00 pm, ESPN3		at Binghamton	L 67–84	13–8 (4–4)	Binghamton University Events Center (3,394); Vestal, NY
February 1, 2023; 7:00 pm, ESPN+		Maine	W 71–53	14–8 (5–4)	Chace Athletic Center (750); Smithfield, RI
February 4, 2023; 1:00 pm, ESPN3		New Hampshire	W 70–46	15–8 (6–4)	Chace Athletic Center (1,405); Smithfield, RI
February 8, 2023; 7:00 pm, ESPN+		at Albany	W 87–62	16–8 (7–4)	McDonough Sports Complex (1,054); Troy, NY
February 11, 2023; 1:00 pm, ESPN3		at UMBC	L 73–76	16–9 (7–5)	Chesapeake Employers Insurance Arena (2,055); Catonsville, MD
February 15, 2023; 7:00 pm, ESPN+		UMass Lowell	L 71–85	16–10 (7–6)	Chace Athletic Center (842); Smithfield, RI
February 22, 2023; 7:00 pm, ESPN+		at NJIT	W 79–78	17–10 (8–6)	Wellness and Events Center (932); Newark, NJ
February 25, 2023; 7:00 pm, ESPN+		Vermont	L 66–70	17–11 (8–7)	Chace Athletic Center (1,600); Smithfield, RI
February 28, 2023; 7:00 pm, ESPN+		at Maine	L 64–66	17–12 (8–8)	Cross Insurance Center (795); Bangor, ME
America East tournament
March 4, 2023; 1:00 pm, ESPN+	(6)	at (3) New Hampshire; Quarterfinals	L 60–67	17–13	Lundholm Gym (678); Durham, NH
*Non-conference game. ^{#}Rankings from AP Poll. (#) Tournament seedings in parentheses. All times are in Eastern.
