= Gedi Juozapaitis =

Lithuanian-British basketball player (born 1998)

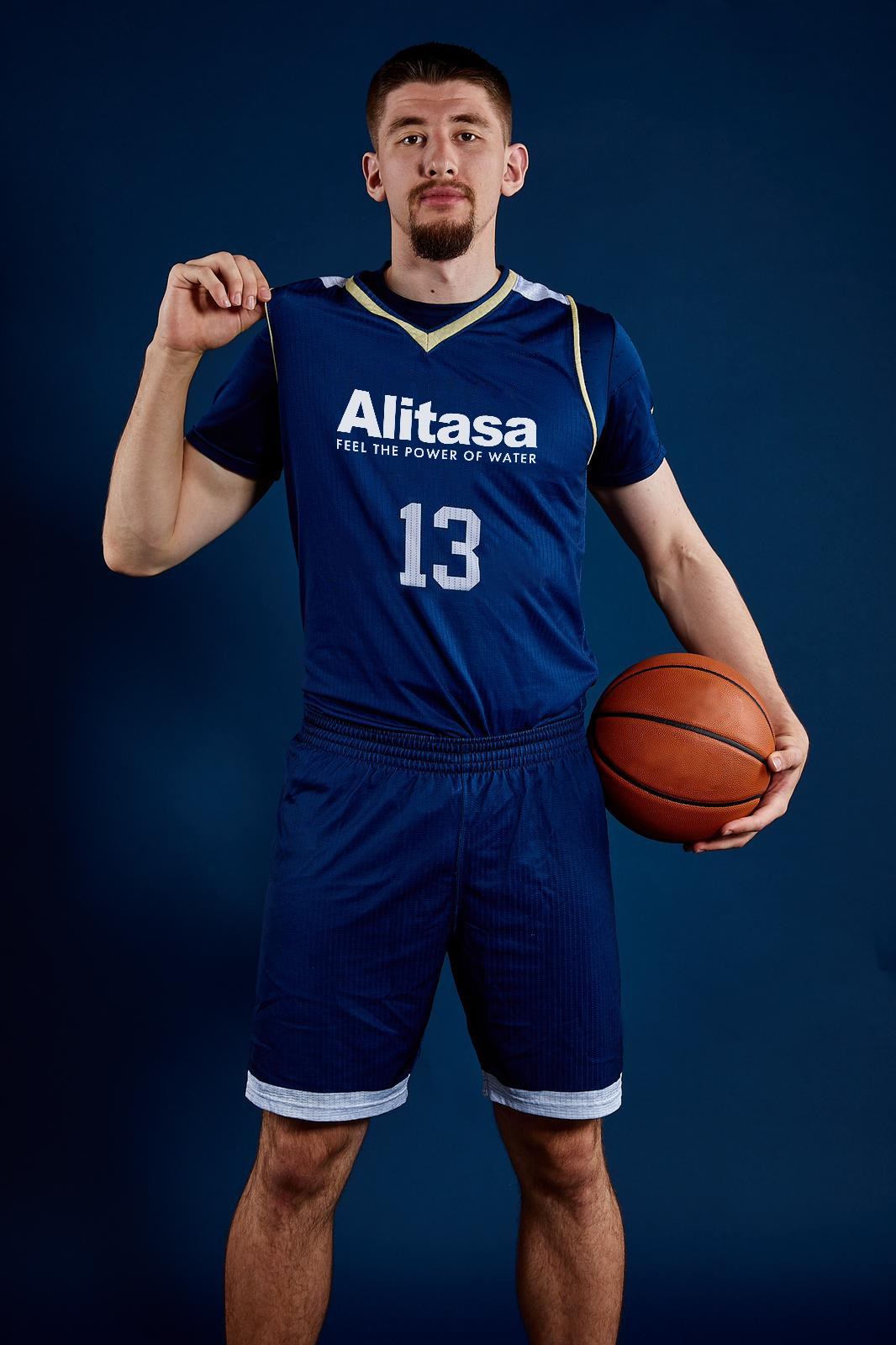

No. 13 – BC Yambol
- Position: Guard / forward
- League: National Basketball League (Bulgaria)

Personal information
- Born: 13 September 1998 (age 28) London, England
- Listed height: 6 ft 4 in (1.93 m)
- Listed weight: 95 kg (209 lb)

Career information
- High school: City of London Academy (Bermondsey, London, England); Woodstock Academy (Woodstock, Connecticut)
- College: Flagler (2018–2020); Georgia Southern (2020–2022); Maine (2022–2023)
- Playing career: 2023–present

Career history
- 2023: Scarborough Shooting Stars
- 2023: BC Yambol

Career highlights
- Third-team All-America East (2022)

Gediminas Juozapaitis (born 13 September 1998) is a Lithuanian professional basketball player born in Palanga, Lithuania and raised in London, United Kingdom, currently playing in Yambol, Bulgaria. Playing primarily at the point guard and power forward positions.

== Early career ==
In 2015, Juozapaitis received Hoopsfix All-Star Classic MVP award as the under-17 presented to him by GB captain Andrew Sullivan. He played for Southwark Pride basketball team for the 2016–17 season.

== College basketball ==
=== 2017–2018 Woodstock Academy ===
Juozapaitis signed to Woodstock Academy on a full athletic scholarship for the 2017–18 season.

=== 2018–2019 Flagler Saints ===
Juozapaitis joined the Flagler Saints as a freshman in 2018. He started all 27 games. He averaged 14.3 points and a team-high 8.2 rebounds per game. He also tallied 62 assists and made 62 three-pointers at a 39.2 three-point field goal percentage. In 2019–20 as a sophomore, he started all 29 games, averaging 19.0 points and 7.6 rebounds per game. Juozapaitis blocked 23 shots and broke the school record for most three-pointers made in a season with 112. He shot 46.1% from three-point range.

=== 2020–2022 Georgia Southern Eagles ===
In 2020, Juozapaitis joined the Georgia Southern Eagles. In his junior year (2020–21), he played in 18 games and started the last 14. He averaged 7.9 points with 2.2 rebounds and 1.7 assists a game. He shot 36 percent from three-point range and made 17 of 18 from the free throw line (.944). In his senior year (2021–22), he finished with 346 points, 99 rebounds, 64 assists, 11 blocks and 28 steals. Juozapaitis shot 35% from three-point range and 95 percent from the free throw line.

=== 2022 Maine Black Bears ===
In 2022, Juozapaitis transferred to play for the Maine Black Bears. He was named to the America East All-Conference Third Team. He was third in scoring in the conference at 15.4 points per game, adding 2.7 rebounds, two assists on 46.4% field goal shooting. On 4 December 2022, the O2 Arena hosted Basketball Hall of Fame Showcase where the opening game between Maine and Marist, which was his first homecoming since playing in the U.S.

== Professional career ==
=== 2023 Scarborough Shooting Stars ===
The Scarborough Shooting Stars of the Canadian Elite Basketball League (CEBL) signed Juozapaitis. The only spot on its 10-man active roster to a non-American import / international player.

=== 2023 BC Yambol ===
BC Yambol (Bulgarian: БК "Ямбол") of Bulgaria's National Basketball League (NBL) signed Gediminas Juozapaitis for the 2023–24 roster.
