= 2021–22 Atlantic 10 Conference men's basketball season =

- League: NCAA Division I
- Sport: Basketball
- Teams: 14

Regular Season

Atlantic 10 Conference Tournament

Seasons
- ← 2020–21 2022–23 →

2021–22 Atlantic 10 men's basketball standings
	Conf.				Overall
Team	W		L	PCT	W		L	PCT
Davidson	15	–	3	.833	27	–	7	.794
Dayton	14	–	4	.778	24	–	11	.686
VCU	14	–	4	.778	22	–	10	.688
St. Bonaventure	12	–	5	.706	23	–	10	.697
Saint Louis	12	–	6	.667	23	–	12	.657
Richmond †	10	–	8	.556	24	–	13	.649
George Washington	8	–	9	.471	12	–	18	.400
Fordham	8	–	10	.444	16	–	16	.500
George Mason	7	–	9	.438	14	–	16	.467
UMass	7	–	11	.389	15	–	17	.469
Rhode Island	5	–	12	.294	15	–	16	.484
La Salle	5	–	13	.278	11	–	19	.367
Saint Joseph's	5	–	13	.278	11	–	19	.367
Duquesne	1	–	16	.059	6	–	24	.200
† 2022 A-10 tournament winner

The 2021–22 Atlantic 10 Conference men's basketball season started non-conference play on November 9, 2021 and began conference play on December 30, 2021. The regular season ended on March 5, 2022, followed by the 2022 Atlantic 10 men's basketball tournament from March 9 to March 13.

== Conference Schedule ==
Each team is scheduled to play 18 conference games. This results in each team playing 8 teams a singular time and 5 teams twice, once at home and once on the road.

== Head coaches ==
=== Coach Changes ===
Fordham hired Kyle Neptune after Jeff Neubauer was fired during the previous midseason after a 1–7 start.

George Mason hired Kim English after Dave Paulsen was fired after going 13–9.

=== Coaches ===
Team	Head Coach	Previous Job	Years At School	Record at School	Atlantic 10 Record	Atlantic 10 Titles	NCAA Tournaments	Sweet 16 Appearances	Elite 8 Appearances
Davidson	Bob McKillop	Long Island Lutheran HS	33	606-373	76-43	1	9	1	1
Dayton	Anthony Grant	Oklahoma City Thunder (Assistant)	5	78-41	48-22	1	0	0	0
Duquesne	Keith Dambrot	Akron	5	65-47	35-33	0	0	0	0
Fordham	Kyle Neptune	Villanova (Assistant)	1	0-0	0-0	0	0	0	0
George Mason	Kim English	Tennessee (Assistant)	1	0-0	0-0	0	0	0	0
George Washington	Jamion Christian	Siena	3	17-31	9-17	0	0	0	0
La Salle	Ashley Howard	Villanova (Assistant)	4	34-52	20-33	0	0	0	0
UMass	Matt McCall	Chattanooga	5	46-65	23-41	0	0	0	0
Rhode Island	David Cox	Rhode Island (Assistant)	4	49-39	28-24	0	0	0	0
Richmond	Chris Mooney	Air Force	17	288-231	144-119	1	2	1	0
St. Bonaventure	Mark Schmidt	Robert Morris	15	245-185	129-106	2	3	0	0
Saint Joseph's	Billy Lange	Philadelphia 76ers (Assistant)	3	11-41	5-25	0	0	0	0
Saint Louis	Travis Ford	Oklahoma State	6	89-65	43-39	1	1	0	0
VCU	Mike Rhoades	Rice	5	80-43	43-25	0	2	0	0

Notes:

- Year at school includes 2021–22 season.
- Overall and Atlantic 10 records are from the time at current school and are through the end of the 2020–21 season.
- NCAA Tournament appearances are from the time at current school only.

== Preseason Awards ==
=== Preseason men's basketball poll ===
First Place Votes in Parentheses

1. St. Bonaventure (28) - 392
2. Richmond - 359
3. Saint Louis - 325
4. VCU - 288
5. Dayton - 274
6. Davidson - 260
7. Rhode Island - 231
8. George Mason - 158
9. UMass - 147
10. Saint Joseph's - 144
11. Duquesne - 129
12. La Salle - 105
13. George Washington - 96
14. Fordham - 32

=== Preseason Honors ===
Honor	Recipient
Preseason All-Atlantic 10 First Team	Hyunjung Lee, Davidson
Preseason All-Atlantic 10 First Team	Jacob Gilyard, Richmond
Preseason All-Atlantic 10 First Team	Grant Golden, Richmond
Preseason All-Atlantic 10 First Team	Osun Osunniyi, St. Bonaventure
Preseason All-Atlantic 10 First Team	Kyle Lofton, St. Bonaventure
Preseason All-Atlantic 10 First Team	Javonte Perkins, Saint Louis
Preseason All-Atlantic 10 Second Team	James Bishop, George Washington
Preseason All-Atlantic 10 Second Team	Tyler Burton, Richmond
Preseason All-Atlantic 10 Second Team	Jaren Holmes, St. Bonaventure
Preseason All-Atlantic 10 Second Team	Taylor Funk, Saint Joseph's
Preseason All-Atlantic 10 Second Team	Jordan Hall, Saint Joseph's
Preseason All-Atlantic 10 Second Team	Vince Williams Jr., VCU
Preseason All-Atlantic 10 Third Team	Luka Brajkovic, Davidson
Preseason All-Atlantic 10 Third Team	Mustapha Amzil, Dayton
Preseason All-Atlantic 10 Third Team	Toumani Camara, Dayton
Preseason All-Atlantic 10 Third Team	Josh Oduro, George Mason
Preseason All-Atlantic 10 Third Team	Jeremy Sheppard, Rhode Island
Preseason All-Atlantic 10 Third Team	Yuri Collins, Saint Louis
Preseason All-Atlantic 10 Defensive Team	Makhel Mitchell, Rhode Island
Preseason All-Atlantic 10 Defensive Team	Jacob Gilyard, Richmond
Preseason All-Atlantic 10 Defensive Team	Osun Osunniyi, St. Bonaventure
Preseason All-Atlantic 10 Defensive Team	Yuri Collins, Saint Louis
Preseason All-Atlantic 10 Defensive Team	Hason Ward, VCU

== Regular season ==
=== Rankings ===
Team	Preseason	Wk 2	Wk 3	Wk 4	Wk 5	Wk 6	Wk 7	Wk 8	Wk 9	Wk 10	Wk 11	Wk 12	Wk 13	Wk 14	Wk 15	Wk 16	Final
Davidson	–	–	–	–	–	–	–	–	RV	RV	RV	25	RV	RV	–		
Davidson	–		–	–	–	–	–	–	–	RV	RV	RV					
Dayton	–	–	–	–	–	–	–	–	–	–	–	–	–	–	–		
Dayton	–		–	–	–	–	–	–	–	–	–	–					
Duquesne	–	–	–	–	–	–	–	–	–	–	–	–	–	–	–		
Duquesne	–		–	–	–	–	–	–	–	–	–	–					
Fordham	–	–	–	–	–	–	–	–	–	–	–	–	–	–	–		
Fordham	–		–	–	–	–	–	–	–	–	–	–					
George Mason	–	–	RV	–	–	–	–	–	–	–	–	–	–	–	–		
George Mason	–		–	–	–	–	–	–	–	–	–	–					
George Washington	–	–	–	–	–	–	–	–	–	–	–	–					
George Washington	–		–	–	–	–	–	–	–	–	–	–					
La Salle	–	–	–	–	–	–	–	–	–	–	–	–					
La Salle	–		–	–	–	–	–	–	–	–	–	–					
UMass	–	–	–	–	–	–	–	–	–	–	–	–					
UMass	–		–	–	–	–	–	–	–	–	–	–					
Rhode Island	–	–	–	–	–	–	–	–	–	–	–	–					
Rhode Island	–		–	–	–	–	–	–	–	–	–	–					
Richmond	RV	–	–	–	–	–	–	–	–	–	–	–					
Richmond	RV		–	–	–	–	–	–	–	–	–	–					
St. Bonaventure	23	22	16	RV	RV	RV	–	–	–	–	–	–					
St. Bonaventure	24*		16	25	RV	RV	–	–	–	–	–	–					
Saint Joseph's	–	–	–	–	–	–	–	–	–	–	–	–					
Saint Joseph's	–		–	–	–	–	–	–	–	–	–	–					
Saint Louis	–	–	–	–	–	–	–	–	–	–	–	–					
Saint Louis	–		–	RV	–	–	–	–	–	–	–	–					
VCU	–	–	–	–	–	–	–	–	–	–	–	–					
VCU	–		–	–	–	–	–	–	–	–	–	–					

Notes:

- No Coaches Poll Week 2
- Top Box is the AP Poll
- Bottom Box is the Coaches Poll

=== Conference standings ===
		Conference		Overall		Tiebreaker
Rank	Team	Record	Percent	Record	Percent	Tiebreaker
1	Davidson	6-0	1.000	16-2	.882	
2	St. Bonaventure	3-1	.750	11-4	.714	
3	VCU	4-2	.667	11-6	.625	Ahead of Dayton based on Head-to-Head Win %
4	Dayton	4-2	.667	12-7	.667	
5	Rhode Island	3-2	.600	12-5	.750	
5	Saint Louis	3-2	.500	12-6	.667	
7	Richmond	3-3	.500	12-7	.611	Ahead of George Mason based on # of games played
8	George Mason	1-1	.500	8-7	.500	
9	Fordham	2-3	.400	9-8	.563	
9	George Washington	2-3	.400	6-11	.313	
11	Saint Joseph's	2-4	.333	8-9	.471	
12	Duquesne	1-3	.250	6-10	.375	
13	UMass	1-5	.200	8-10	.444	
13	La Salle	1-5	.167	6-10	.375	

=== Conference Matrix ===
	Davidson	Dayton	Duquesne	Fordham	George Mason	George Washington	La Salle	UMass	Rhode Island	Richmond	St. Joseph's	Saint Louis	St. Bonaventure	VCU
vs. Davidson	–			0-1				0-1	0-1	0-1	0-1			0-1
vs. Dayton		–	0-1		1-0	0-1						0-1	0-1	1-0
vs. Duquesne		1-0	–	1-0				0-1					1-0	
vs. Fordham	1-0		0-1	–			0-1			1-0		1-1		
vs. George Mason		0-1			–	1-0								
vs. George Washington		1-0			0-1	–			0-1		1-0			1-0
vs. La Salle				1-0			–		1-0	1-0	0-1		1-0	1-0
vs. UMass	1-0		1-0					–	1-0	1-0		0-1		
vs. Rhode Island	1-0					1-0	0-1	0-1	–		0-1			
vs. Richmond	1-0			0-1			0-1	0-1		–	1-0	1-0		
vs. Saint Joseph's	1-0					0-1	1-0		1-0	0-1	–			1-0
vs. Saint Louis		1-0		0-1				1-1		0-1		–		
vs. St. Bonaventure		1-0	0-1				0-1						–	0-1
vs. VCU	1-0	0-1				0-1	0-1				0-1		1-0	–

=== Players of the Week ===
Week	Player(s) of the Week	School	Rookie(s) of the Week	School
Nov. 15	Josh Oduro; Taylor Funk	George Mason; Saint Joseph's	Primo Spears	Duquesne
Nov. 22	Jaren Holmes	St. Bonaventure	Erik Reynolds II	Saint Joseph's
Nov. 29	Leon Ayers III	Duquesne	Malachi Smith	Dayton
Dec. 6	Hyunjung Lee	Davidson	Malachi Smith (2)	Dayton (2)
Dec. 13	Jordan Hall	Saint Joseph's (2)	DaRon Holmes II	Dayton (3)
Dec. 20	Tyler Burton	Richmond	Malachi Smith (3)	Dayton (4)
Dec. 27	Luka Brajkovic	Davidson (2)	DaRon Holmes II (2)	Dayton (5)
Jan. 3	Yuri Collins	Saint Louis	Erik Reynolds II (2)	Saint Joseph's (2)
Jan. 10	Foster Loyer	Davidson (3)	Jackie Johnson III	Duquesne (2)
Jan. 17	Luka Brajkovic (2)	Davidson (4)	DaRon Holmes II (3)	Dayton (6)
Jan. 24	Darius Quisenberry	Fordham	Primo Spears (2)	Duquesne (3)
Jan. 31	Vince Williams Jr.	VCU	Erik Reynolds II (3); DaRon Holmes II (4)	Saint Joseph's (3); Dayton (7)
Feb. 7	Tyler Burton (2); Yuri Collins (2)	Richmond (2); Saint Louis (2)	Erik Reynolds II (4)	Saint Joseph's (4)
Feb. 14	Kyle Lofton	St. Bonaventure (2)	Malachi Smith (4)	Dayton (8)
Feb. 21	Hyunjung Lee (2); Dominick Welch	Davidson (5); St. Bonaventure (3)	DaRon Holmes II (5)	Dayton (9)
Feb. 28	Francis Okoro	Saint Louis (3)	Khalil Brantley	La Salle
Mar. 7	Chuba Ohams	Fordham (2)	Primo Spears (3)	Duquesne (4)

=== Records against other conferences ===
Power 7 Conferences	Record	Power 7 Conferences	Record
ACC	8-2	American	2-4
Big East	2-7	Big Ten	3-2
Big 12	1-2	Pac-12	0-3
SEC	3-3	Power 7 Total	19-23
Other Division I Conferences	Record	Other Division I Conferences	Record
America East	6-2	ASUN	2-2
Big Sky	0-2	Big South	3-0
Big West	1-2	Colonial	4-7
Conference USA	5-5	Horizon League	3-0
Ivy League	7-1	MAAC	5-2
MAC	5-2	MEAC	5-1
MVC	3-4	MWC	1-2
NEC	9-2	OVC	2-2
Patriot League	8-2	SoCon	3-1
Southland	None	SWAC	1-0
Summit League	2-0	Sun Belt	2-0
WAC	1-1	WCC	0-1
Other Division I Total			78-41
NCAA Division I Total			97-64
NCAA Division II Total			1-0
NAIA Total			1-0
USCAA Total			1-0
Total Non-Conference Record			100-64

== Postseason ==
The Atlantic 10 Men's Basketball tournament was held in Washington, D.C. at Capital One Arena from March 9 to March 13

First round Wednesday, March 9 ESPN+
12	La Salle	63
13	Saint Joseph's	56
11	Rhode Island	79
14	Duquesne	77

Second round Thursday, March 10; USA Network/Peacock
8	Fordham	54
9	George Mason	49
5	Saint Louis	71
12	La Salle	51
7	George Washington	88
10	UMass	99
6	Richmond	64
11	Rhode Island	59

Quarterfinals; Friday, March 11; USA Network/Peacock
1	Davidson	74
8	Fordham	56
4	St. Bonaventure	56
5	Saint Louis	57
2	Dayton	75
10	UMass	72
3	VCU	64
6	Richmond	75

Semifinals; Saturday, March 12; CBSSN
1	Davidson	84
5	Saint Louis	69
2	Dayton	64
6	Richmond	68

Championship; Sunday, March 13; CBS/Paramount+
1	Davidson
6	Richmond
