= 2021–22 UMass Minutemen basketball team =

American college basketball season

2021–22 UMass Minutemen basketball
- Conference: Atlantic 10 Conference
- Record: 15–17 (7–11 A–10)
- Head coach: Matt McCall (5th season)
- Assistant coaches: Tyson Wheeler; Lucious Jordan
- Home arena: Mullins Center

2021–22 Atlantic 10 men's basketball standings
	Conf.				Overall
Team	W		L	PCT	W		L	PCT
Davidson	15	–	3	.833	27	–	7	.794
Dayton	14	–	4	.778	24	–	11	.686
VCU	14	–	4	.778	22	–	10	.688
St. Bonaventure	12	–	5	.706	23	–	10	.697
Saint Louis	12	–	6	.667	23	–	12	.657
Richmond †	10	–	8	.556	24	–	13	.649
George Washington	8	–	9	.471	12	–	18	.400
Fordham	8	–	10	.444	16	–	16	.500
George Mason	7	–	9	.438	14	–	16	.467
UMass	7	–	11	.389	15	–	17	.469
Rhode Island	5	–	12	.294	15	–	16	.484
La Salle	5	–	13	.278	11	–	19	.367
Saint Joseph's	5	–	13	.278	11	–	19	.367
Duquesne	1	–	16	.059	6	–	24	.200
† 2022 A-10 tournament winner

The 2021–22 UMass Minutemen basketball team represented the University of Massachusetts Amherst during the 2021–22 NCAA Division I men's basketball season. The Minutemen were led by fifth-year head coach Matt McCall and played their home games at the William D. Mullins Memorial Center in Amherst, Massachusetts as members of the Atlantic 10 Conference. They finished the season 15–16, 7–11 in A-10 play to finish in 10th place. They defeated George Washington in the second round of the A-10 tournament before losing to Dayton in the quarterfinals.

On March 2, 2022, the school fired head coach Matt McCall. On March 25, the school named former Kansas State and South Carolina head coach Frank Martin the team's new head coach.

== Previous season ==
The Minutemen finished the 2020–21 season 8–7, 6–4 in A-10 play to finish in a tie for fourth place. In the Atlantic 10 tournament they defeated Saint Joseph's in the second round before losing to Saint Louis in the quarterfinals.

=== Departures ===
Name	Number	Pos.	Height	Weight	Year	Hometown	Reason for departure
Brady Antonopoulos	0	G	6'1"	165	Senior	West Brookfield, MA	Walk-on; graduated
Mark Gasperini	10	C	6'10"	255	GS Senior	Moscow, Russia	Left the team for personal reasons
Carl Pierre	12	G	6'4"	190	Senior	Boston, MA	Graduate transferred to Rice
Ronnie DeGray III	13	F	6'7"	220	Freshman	Parker, CO	Transferred to Missouri
Tre Mitchell	33	C	6'9"	240	Sophomore	Pittsburgh, PA	Transferred to Texas

=== Incoming transfers ===
Name	Number	Pos.	Height	Weight	Year	Hometown	Previous School
Trent Buttrick	0	F	6'8"	240	GS Senior	Bloomsburg, PA	Penn State
Greg Jones	10	F	6'7"	225	GS Senior	Bronx, NY	Southern Connecticut
CJ Kelly	12	G	6'5"	190	Senior	Long Island, NY	Albany
Rich Kelly	22	G	6'1"	175	GS Senior	Shelton, CT	Boston College
Michael Steadman	24	F	6'11"	215	RS Senior	Union City, CA	Montana
John Kelly	44	F	6'7"	195	Junior	Shelton, CT	Fairfield

=== 2021 recruiting class ===
There were no incoming recruits for the class of 2021.

== Roster ==
2021–22 UMass Minutemen men's basketball team
Players
Coaches

Pos.	#	Name	Height	Weight	Year	Previous school	Hometown
F	0	Trent Buttrick	6 ft 8 in (2.03 m)	240 lb (109 kg)	RS Sr	Community School of Naples; Penn State	Bloomsburg, PA
G	1	Javohn Garcia	6 ft 2 in (1.88 m)	180 lb (82 kg)	So	Brewster Academy	Pickerington, OH
G/F	2	Preston Santos	6 ft 6 in (1.98 m)	185 lb (84 kg)	Jr	Woodstock Academy	Providence, RI
G	3	Kolton Mitchell	6 ft 3 in (1.91 m)	185 lb (84 kg)	Jr	Victory Rock Prep	Fort Myers, FL
G	5	Cairo McCrory	6 ft 5 in (1.96 m)	190 lb (86 kg)	Fr	Woodstock Academy	Hartford, CT
F	10	Greg Jones	6 ft 7 in (2.01 m)	220 lb (100 kg)	RS Sr	John Marshall HS; Southern Connecticut	Richmond, VA
G	11	Noah Fernandes	5 ft 11 in (1.8 m)	175 lb (79 kg)	Jr	Woodstock Academy; Wichita State	Mattapoisett, MA
G	15	CJ Kelly	6 ft 5 in (1.96 m)	190 lb (86 kg)	Sr	Queens HS of Teaching; Albany	Long Island, NY
G	20	Ryan Marcus (W)	6 ft 3 in (1.91 m)	185 lb (84 kg)	So	Wakefield Memorial HS	Wakefield, MA
G	22	Rich Kelly	6 ft 1 in (1.85 m)	175 lb (79 kg)	GS	Cheshire Academy; Boston College	Shleton, CT
G	23	T.J. Weeks	6 ft 4 in (1.93 m)	185 lb (84 kg)	RS So	Bishop Hendricken Catholic HS; Woodstock Academy	Warwick, RI
F	24	Michael Steadman	6 ft 11 in (2.11 m)	231 lb (105 kg)	RS Sr	James Logan HS; San Jose State	Union City, CA
F	35	Dibaji Walker	6 ft 9 in (2.06 m)	200 lb (91 kg)	Sr	Woodstock Academy; Cleveland State	Columbus, OH
F	44	John Kelly	6 ft 7 in (2.01 m)	215 lb (98 kg)	Jr	Williston Northampton School; Fairfield	Shelton, CT
F	45	Dyondre Dominguez	6 ft 9 in (2.06 m)	205 lb (93 kg)	So	Woodstock Academy	Providence, RI

Head coach

- Matt McCall (Chattanooga)

Assistant coach(es)

- Tyson Wheeler (Fairfield)
- Lucious Jordan (Albany)

Legend

- (C) Team captain
- (S) Suspended
- (I) Ineligible
- (W) Walk-on
- Injured
- Current redshirt

Roster

== Schedule and results ==
Date time, TV	Rank^{#}	Opponent^{#}	Result	Record	Site (attendance) city, state
Non-conference regular season
November 9, 2021*; 7:30 p.m., NESN+		UMBC	W 77–60	1–0	Mullins Center (2,903); Amherst, MA
November 12, 2021*; 8:00 p.m., ESPN+		at Yale	L 71–91	1–1	Payne Whitney Gymnasium (1,590); New Haven, CT
November 15, 2021*; 7:00 p.m., CBSSN		Penn State	W 81–56	2–1	Mullins Center (3,022); Amherst, MA
November 18, 2021*; 5:30 p.m., CBSSN		vs. Weber State; Jersey Mike's Classic	L 73–88	2–2	McArthur Center; St. Petersburg, FL
November 19, 2021*; 3:00 p.m., CBSSN		vs. UNC Greensboro; Jersey Mike's Classic	W 93–90 ^{OT}	3–2	McArthur Center (341); St. Petersburg, FL
November 21, 2021*; 2:30 p.m., CBSSN		vs. Ball State; Jersey Mike's Classic	L 86–89	3–3	McArthur Center (376); St. Petersburg, FL
November 24, 2021*; 7:00 p.m., NESN+		UMass Lowell	W 92–81	4–3	Mullins Center (1,492); Amherst, MA
November 27, 2021*; 2:00 p.m., Peacock		Rutgers	W 85–83	5–3	Mullins Center (1,881); Amherst, MA
December 4, 2021*; 12:00 p.m., NESN		Harvard	W 87–77	6–3	Mullins Center (2,333); Amherst, MA
December 7, 2021*; 7:00 p.m., NESN		at Northeastern	L 76–82	6–4	Matthews Arena (1,252); Boston, MA
December 11, 2021*; 4:30 p.m., FloSports		vs. North Texas; Basketball Hall of Fame Classic	L 57–66	6–5	Dickies Arena; Fort Worth, TX
December 19, 2021*; 7:00 p.m., NESN		Fairfield	W 77–73 ^{OT}	7–5	Mullins Center (1,322); Amherst, MA
December 22, 2021*; 1:00 p.m.		NJIT	Canceled due to COVID-19 protocols at NJIT		Mullins Center; Amherst, MA
A-10 regular season
January 5, 2022; 7:00 p.m., ESPN+		at Richmond	L 72–80	7–6 (0–1)	Robins Center (5,004); Richmond, VA
January 8, 2022; 12:00 p.m., NESN+		Duquesne	L 74–78	7–7 (0–2)	Mullins Center (1,978); Amherst, MA
January 11, 2022; 7:00 p.m., ESPN+		at Davidson	L 67–77	7–8 (0–3)	John M. Belk Arena (2,495); Davidson, NC
January 15, 2022; 4:30 p.m., USA		Rhode Island	L 68–81	7–9 (0–4)	Mullins Center (2,181); Amherst, MA
January 20, 2021; 7:00 p.m., ESPN+		Saint Louis; Rescheduled from December 30	W 91–85	8–9 (1–4)	Mullins Center (1,665); Amherst, MA
January 23, 2022; 2:30 p.m., USA		at Saint Louis	L 59–90	8–10 (1–5)	Chaifetz Arena (5,136); St. Louis, MO
January 26, 2022; 7:00 p.m., ESPN+		at La Salle	W 77–71	9–10 (2–5)	Tom Gola Arena (1,389); Philadelphia, PA
January 30, 2022; 2:00 p.m., USA		George Mason	L 62–72	9–11 (2–6)	Mullins Center (2,321); Amherst, MA
February 5, 2022; 2:00 p.m., ESPN+		at Rhode Island	W 78–67	10–11 (3–6)	Ryan Center (5,847); Kingston, RI
February 9, 2022; 7:00 p.m., NESN		George Washington	L 68–77	10–12 (3–7)	Mullins Center (3,842); Amherst, MA
February 12, 2022; 12:00 p.m., NESN		Saint Joseph's	W 69–67	11–12 (4–7)	Mullins Center (3,127); Amherst, MA
February 16, 2022; 7:00 p.m., ESPN+		at St. Bonaventure	L 71–83	11–13 (4–8)	Reilly Center (3,452); Olean, NY
February 19, 2022; 12:00 p.m., ESPN+		La Salle	W 80–74	12–13 (5–8)	Mullins Center (2,009); Amherst, MA
February 23, 2022; 7:00 p.m., ESPN+		at Dayton	L 61–82	12–14 (5–9)	UD Arena (13,407); Dayton, OH
February 26, 2022; 4:30 p.m., USA		VCU	L 62–77	12–15 (5–10)	Mullins Center (2,758); Amherst, MA
February 28, 2022; 7:00 p.m., ESPN+		at Fordham; Rescheduled from January 2	L 73–85	12–16 (5–11)	Rose Hill Gymnasium (754); Bronx, NY
March 2, 2022; 7:00 p.m., ESPN+		Fordham	W 81–73	13–16 (6–11)	Mullins Center (2,186); Amherst, MA
March 5, 2022; 4:00 p.m., ESPN+		at George Mason	W 83–80 ^{OT}	14–16 (7–11)	EagleBank Arena (3,652); Fairfax, VA
A-10 tournament
March 10, 2022; 6:00 p.m., USA/Peacock	(10)	vs. (7) George Washington; Second round	W 99–88	15–16	Capital One Arena; Washington, D.C.
March 11, 2022; 6:00 p.m., USA/Peacock	(10)	vs. (2) Dayton; Quarterfinals	L 72–75	15–17	Capital One Arena; Washington, D.C.
*Non-conference game. ^{#}Rankings from AP Poll / Coaches' Poll. (#) Tournament seedings in parentheses. All times are in Eastern.
