= 2021–22 George Washington Colonials men's basketball team =

American college basketball season

2021–22 George Washington Colonials men's basketball
- Conference: Atlantic 10 Conference
- Record: 12–18 (8–9 A–10)
- Head coach: Jamion Christian (3rd season)
- Assistant coaches: Eric Atkins; Graham Bousley; Ryan Devlin
- Home arena: Charles E. Smith Center

2021–22 Atlantic 10 men's basketball standings
	Conf.				Overall
Team	W		L	PCT	W		L	PCT
Davidson	15	–	3	.833	27	–	7	.794
Dayton	14	–	4	.778	24	–	11	.686
VCU	14	–	4	.778	22	–	10	.688
St. Bonaventure	12	–	5	.706	23	–	10	.697
Saint Louis	12	–	6	.667	23	–	12	.657
Richmond †	10	–	8	.556	24	–	13	.649
George Washington	8	–	9	.471	12	–	18	.400
Fordham	8	–	10	.444	16	–	16	.500
George Mason	7	–	9	.438	14	–	16	.467
UMass	7	–	11	.389	15	–	17	.469
Rhode Island	5	–	12	.294	15	–	16	.484
La Salle	5	–	13	.278	11	–	19	.367
Saint Joseph's	5	–	13	.278	11	–	19	.367
Duquesne	1	–	16	.059	6	–	24	.200
† 2022 A-10 tournament winner

The 2021–22 George Washington Colonials men's basketball team represented George Washington University during the 2021–22 NCAA Division I men's basketball season. The team was led by third-year head coach Jamion Christian, and played their home games at Charles E. Smith Center in Washington, D.C. as a member of the Atlantic 10 Conference.

== Previous season ==
In a season limited due to the ongoing COVID-19 pandemic, the Colonials finished the 2020–21 season with a 5–12 record and a 3–5 record in Atlantic 10 play. They defeated Fordham in the first round of the 2021 Atlantic 10 men's basketball tournament before losing to George Mason.

== Offseason ==
=== Departures ===
Name	Number	Pos.	Height	Weight	Year	Hometown	Reason for departure
Matt Moyer	0	F	6'9"	225	GS Senior	Gahanna, OH	Graduated
Tyler Brelsford	2	G	6'4"	175	Freshman	Ellicott, MD	Transferred to Bryant
Chase Paar	3	F	6'9"	245	Sophomore	Mount Airy, MD	Transferred to Towson
Lincoln Ball	5	G	6'6"	220	Freshman	Williamsport, MD	Transferred to American
Jamison Battle	10	F	6'7"	225	Sophomore	Robbinsdale, MN	Transferred to Minnesota
Sloan Seymour	23	F	6'9"	215	Junior	Albany, NY	Transferred to New Hampshire
Brandon Leftwich	32	G	6'3"	185	GS Senior	Brooklyn, NY	Walk-on; graduated

=== Incoming transfers ===
Name	Number	Pos.	Height	Weight	Year	Hometown	Previous School
Joe Bamisile	1	G	6'4"	195	Sophomore	Chesterfield, VA	Virginia Tech
Brendan Adams	10	G	6'4"	195	Senior	Baltimore, MD	UConn
Bryan Knapp	12	G	6'1"	170	Senior	Washington, D.C.	Cornell
Ira Lee	14	F	6'8"	245	Senior	Los Angeles, CA	Arizona
Qwanzi Samuels	20	F	6'8"	192	Junior	District Heights, MD	Florida Gulf Coast
Theofanis Stamoulis	34	G	6'3"		Senior	Athens, Greece	Adelphi

=== Recruiting classes ===
==== 2021 recruiting class ====
College recruiting information
Name	Hometown	School	Height	Weight	Commit date
Brayon Freeman #50 PG	Oxon Hill, MD	National Christian Academy	6 ft 1 in (1.85 m)	160 lb (73 kg)	Aug 4, 2020
Brayon Freeman #50 PG	Recruit ratings: Scout: Rivals: 247Sports: ESPN: (74)				
Daniel Nixon; PF	New York, NY	Winston Salem Christian School	6 ft 7 in (2.01 m)	215 lb (98 kg)	Dec 30, 2020
Daniel Nixon; PF	Recruit ratings: Scout: Rivals: 247Sports: ESPN: (0)				
Overall recruit ranking:
Note: In many cases, Scout, Rivals, 247Sports, On3, and ESPN may conflict in their listings of height and weight.; In these cases, the average was taken. ESPN grades are on a 100-point scale.; Sources: "2021 Team Ranking". Rivals.

==== 2022 recruiting class ====
College recruiting information (2022)
Name	Hometown	School	Height	Weight	Commit date
Jabari West; PG	Hot Springs, AR	Hot Springs High School	6 ft 1 in (1.85 m)	160 lb (73 kg)	Sep 7, 2021
Jabari West; PG	Recruit ratings: Scout: Rivals: 247Sports: ESPN: (0)				
Overall recruit ranking:
Note: In many cases, Scout, Rivals, 247Sports, On3, and ESPN may conflict in their listings of height and weight.; In these cases, the average was taken. ESPN grades are on a 100-point scale.; Sources: "2022 Team Ranking". Rivals.

== Roster ==
2021–22 George Washington Colonials men's basketball team
Players
Coaches

Pos.	#	Name	Height	Weight	Year	Previous school	Hometown
G	0	Laziz Talipov (W)	6 ft 1 in (1.85 m)	160 lb (73 kg)	Fr	Trinity Preparatory School	Orlando, Florida
G	1	Joe Bamisile	6 ft 4 in (1.93 m)	195 lb (88 kg)	So	Virginia Tech	Chesterfield, Virginia
G	2	Brayon Freeman	6 ft 2 in (1.88 m)	180 lb (82 kg)	Fr	Huntington Prep School	Washington, D.C.
G	3	Amir Harris	6 ft 5 in (1.96 m)	210 lb (95 kg)	Sr	Nebraska	Frederick, Maryland
F	4	Ricky Lindo	6 ft 8 in (2.03 m)	220 lb (100 kg)	Sr	Maryland	Washington, D.C.
G	10	Brendan Adams	6 ft 4 in (1.93 m)	205 lb (93 kg)	Sr	UConn	Baltimore, Maryland
G	11	James Bishop	6 ft 2 in (1.88 m)	185 lb (84 kg)	Jr	LSU	Baltimore, Maryland
G	12	Bryan Knapp	6 ft 1 in (1.85 m)	190 lb (86 kg)	Sr	Cornell	Washington, D.C.
F	13	Hunter Dean	6 ft 10 in (2.08 m)	235 lb (107 kg)	Jr	Southern Miss	Mandeville, Louisiana
F	14	Ira Lee	6 ft 8 in (2.03 m)	240 lb (109 kg)	RS Sr	Arizona	Los Angeles, California
F	20	Qwanzi Samuels	6 ft 9 in (2.06 m)	205 lb (93 kg)	Jr	Loomis Chaffee School	District Heights, Maryland
C	21	Noel Brown	6 ft 11 in (2.11 m)	270 lb (122 kg)	So	Flint Hill School	Leesburg, Virginia
F	22	Tyler Warner (W)	6 ft 10 in (2.08 m)	250 lb (113 kg)	Fr	Avon Old Farms	Rochester, New York
F	23	Daniel Nixon	6 ft 7 in (2.01 m)	225 lb (102 kg)	Fr	Winston Salem Christian School	White Plains, New York
F	33	Miles Gally	6 ft 9 in (2.06 m)	220 lb (100 kg)	Jr	Richard Montgomery High School	Rockville, Maryland
G	34	Theofanis Stamoulis	6 ft 3 in (1.91 m)	185 lb (84 kg)	Sr	Adelphi	Athens, Greece

Head coach

- Jamion Christian (Mount St. Mary's)

Assistant coach(es)

- Eric Atkins (Notre Dame)
- Graham Bousley (Wisconsin)
- Ryan Devlin (Pittsburgh)

Legend

- (C) Team captain
- (S) Suspended
- (I) Ineligible
- (W) Walk-on
- Injured
- Current redshirt

Roster

== Schedule and results ==
Date time, TV	Rank^{#}	Opponent^{#}	Result	Record	High points	High rebounds	High assists	Site (attendance) city, state
Exhibition
November 1, 2021*; 6:30 p.m.		Hood College	W 93–51	–	22 – Bishop	11 – Dean	7 – Bishop	Charles E. Smith Center (890); Washington, D.C.
Non-conference regular season
November 9, 2021*; 8:00 p.m., NBCSWA+/ESPN+		Saint Francis (PA)	W 75–72	1–0	22 – Adams	9 – Lindo	5 – Harris	Charles E. Smith Center (1,821); Washington, D.C.
November 11, 2021*; 6:30 p.m., BTN		at No. 21 Maryland	L 64–71	1–1	20 – Bamisile	9 – Lindo Jr.	3 – Lindo Jr.	Xfinity Center (13,398); College Park, MD
November 13, 2021*; 10:00 p.m., ESPN+		at UC San Diego	L 55–75	1–2	13 – Lindo Jr.	11 – Lindo Jr.	2 – Adams	RIMAC Arena (2,145); San Diego, CA
November 16, 2021*; 10:30 p.m., ESPN+		at Cal State Fullerton	L 59–74	1–3	19 – Bishop	8 – Lindo Jr.	4 – Adams	Titan Gym (748); Fullerton, CA
November 19, 2021*; 7:00 p.m., NBCSWA/ESPN+		UMass Lowell	L 56–67	1–4	18 – Bishop	14 – Bamisile	2 – Freeman	Charles E. Smith Center (1,424); Washington, D.C.
November 22, 2021*; 2:30 p.m., FloSports		vs. Wright State; Naples Invitational quarterfina	W 74–63	2–4	18 – Bishop	9 – Bamisile	6 – Lindo Jr.	Community School of Naples (433); Naples, FL
November 23, 2021*; 5:30 p.m., FloSports		vs. Kent State; Naples Invitational semifinal	L 69–77	2–5	19 – Bishop	6 – Adams	6 – Bishop	Community School of Naples (307); Naples, FL
November 24, 2021*; 5:30 p.m., FloSports		vs. Missouri State; Naples Invitational third place game	L 54–72	2–6	17 – Bishop	7 – Bamisile	3 – Freeman	Community School of Naples (137); Naples, FL
December 1, 2021*; 7:00 p.m., NBCSWA+/ESPN+		Boston University	L 54–56	2–7	23 – Bishop	11 – Lindo Jr.	4 – Freeman	Charles E. Smith Center (1,617); Washington, D.C.
December 4, 2021*; 4:00 p.m., ESPN+		at Charlotte	L 79–86	2–8	23 – Bishop	7 – Bamisile	8 – Freeman	Dale F. Halton Arena (2,626); Charlotte, NC
December 8, 2021*; 6:30 p.m., ESPN+		Coppin State	W 75–62	3–8	25 – Bamisile	10 – Bamisile	8 – Freeman	Charles E. Smith Center (913); Washington, D.C.
December 13, 2021*; 7:00 p.m., NBCSWA+/ESPN+		Radford	W 67-58	4–8	21 – Bishop	14 – Lindo Jr.	2 – 4 Tied	Charles E. Smith Center (1,013); Washington, D.C.
December 22, 2021*; 12:00 p.m., NBCSWA/ESPN+		Maryland Eastern Shore	Postponed due to COVID-19 protocols					Charles E. Smith Center; Washington, D.C.
Atlantic 10 Regular Season
December 30, 2021; 4:00 p.m., NBCSWA/ESPN+		St. Bonaventure	Postponed due to COVID-19 protocols					Charles E. Smith Center; Washington, D.C.
January 8, 2022; 12:00 p.m., USA		Dayton	L 58–83	4–9 (0–1)	25 – Bamisile	6 – Bamisile	5 – Freeman	Charles E. Smith Center (0); Washington, D.C.
January 11, 2022; 7:00 p.m., MASN2/ESPN+		at VCU	L 57–84	4–10 (0–2)	16 – Bishop	10 – Lindo Jr.	3 – Freeman	Siegel Center (6,327); Richmond, VA
January 17, 2022; 2:00 p.m., CBSSN		George Mason; Revolutionary Rivalry	W 77–76	5–10 (1–2)	26 – Bamisile	6 – Bamisile	5 – Bishop	Charles E. Smith Center (0); Washington, D.C.
January 19, 2022; 7:00 p.m., ESPN+		at Saint Joseph's; Rescheduled from January 2	L 61–72	5–11 (1–3)	22 – Bamisile	11 – Dean	3 – Tied	Hagan Arena (777); Philadelphia, PA
January 22, 2022; 12:30 p.m., USA		at Rhode Island	W 63–61	6–11 (2–3)	15 – Dean	11 – Dean	5 – Freeman	Ryan Center (4,667); Kingston, RI
January 26, 2022; 8:00 p.m., ESPN+		at Saint Louis	L 67–80	6–12 (2–4)	30 – Bishop	10 – Dean	3 – Tied	Chaifetz Arena (4,238); St. Louis, MO
January 30, 2022; 12:00 p.m., USA		Fordham	W 64–55	7–12 (3–4)	25 – Bishop	14 – Dean	3 – Tied	Charles E. Smith Center (1,007); Washington, D.C.
February 2, 2022; 7:00 p.m., ESPN+		La Salle	W 89–87	8–12 (4–4)	27 – Bishop	6 – Dean	7 – Freeman	Charles E. Smith Center (919); Washington, D.C.
February 5, 2022; 2:00 p.m., NBCSWA/ESPN+		Davidson	L 73–78	8–13 (4–5)	26 – Bishop	4 – Bamisile	4 – Freeman	Charles E. Smith Center (1,821); Washington, D.C.
February 9, 2022; 7:00 p.m., ESPN+		at UMass	W 77–68	9–13 (5–5)	24 – Bishop	12 – Dean	5 – Tied	Mullins Center (3,842); Amherst, MA
February 12, 2022; 2:00 p.m., ESPN+		at Dayton	L 54–80	9–14 (5–6)	10 – Lindo Jr.	9 – Lindo Jr.	4 – Freeman	UD Arena (13,407); Dayton, OH
February 16, 2022; 7:00 p.m., ESPN+		at Duquesne; Rescheduled from January 5	W 73–52	10–14 (6–6)	21 – Bamisile	12 – Lindo Jr.	3 – Bamisile	UPMC Cooper Fieldhouse (1,985); Pittsburgh, PA
February 19, 2022; 7:00 p.m., NBCSWA/ESPN+		Rhode Island	W 72–61	11–14 (7–6)	20 – Bamisile	9 – Dean	4 – Lindo Jr.	Charles E. Smith Center (1,604); Washington, D.C.
February 22, 2022; 7:00 p.m., NBCSWA/ESPN+		Richmond	L 71–84	11–15 (7–7)	29 – Bamisile	7 – Tied	5 – Freeman	Charles E. Smith Center; Washington, D.C.
February 27, 2022; 2:30 p.m., USA		at George Mason; Revolutionary Rivalry	L 62–69	11–16 (7–8)	18 – Bamisile	7 – Adams	3 – Adams	EagleBank Arena (4,022); Fairfax, VA
March 2, 2022; 7:00 p.m., NBCSWA/ESPN+		Duquesne	W 98–93 ^{3OT}	12–16 (8–8)	30 – Bamisile	14 – Lindo Jr.	6 – Freeman	Charles E. Smith Center (1,164); Washington, D.C.
March 5, 2022; 2:00 p.m., ESPN+		at Fordham	L 66–70	12–17 (8–9)	17 – Freeman	8 – Lindo Jr.	5 – Freeman	Rose Hill Gymnasium (1,387); Bronx, NY
A-10 tournament
March 10, 2022; 6:00 p.m., USA	(7)	vs. (10) UMass; Second round	L 88–99	12–18	25 – Bamisile	11 – Lindo Jr.	7 – Freeman	Capital One Arena; Washington, D.C.
*Non-conference game. ^{#}Rankings from AP Poll. (#) Tournament seedings in parentheses. All times are in Eastern Time.
