= 2021–22 Rhode Island Rams men's basketball team =

American college basketball season

2021–22 Rhode Island Rams men's basketball
- Conference: Atlantic 10 Conference
- Record: 15–16 (5–12 A-10)
- Head coach: David Cox (4th season)
- Assistant coaches: Todd Bozeman; T. J. Buchanan; Austin Carroll
- Home arena: Ryan Center

2021–22 Atlantic 10 men's basketball standings
	Conf.				Overall
Team	W		L	PCT	W		L	PCT
Davidson	15	–	3	.833	27	–	7	.794
Dayton	14	–	4	.778	24	–	11	.686
VCU	14	–	4	.778	22	–	10	.688
St. Bonaventure	12	–	5	.706	23	–	10	.697
Saint Louis	12	–	6	.667	23	–	12	.657
Richmond †	10	–	8	.556	24	–	13	.649
George Washington	8	–	9	.471	12	–	18	.400
Fordham	8	–	10	.444	16	–	16	.500
George Mason	7	–	9	.438	14	–	16	.467
UMass	7	–	11	.389	15	–	17	.469
Rhode Island	5	–	12	.294	15	–	16	.484
La Salle	5	–	13	.278	11	–	19	.367
Saint Joseph's	5	–	13	.278	11	–	19	.367
Duquesne	1	–	16	.059	6	–	24	.200
† 2022 A-10 tournament winner

The 2021–22 Rhode Island Rams basketball team represented the University of Rhode Island during the 2021–22 NCAA Division I men's basketball season. The Rams, led by fourth-year head coach David Cox, played their home games at the Ryan Center in Kingston, Rhode Island as members of the Atlantic 10 Conference (A-10). They finished the season 15–16, 5–12 in A-10 play, to finish in 11th place. They defeated Duquesne in the first round of the A-10 tournament before losing to Richmond in the second round.

On March 11, 2022, the school fired head coach David Cox. On March 18, the school hired former Dayton and Indiana head coach Archie Miller as the team's new head coach.

== Previous season ==
In a season limited due to the ongoing COVID-19 pandemic, the Rams finished the 2020–21 season 10–15, 7–10 in A-10 play, to finish in 10th place. They lost in the second round of the A-10 tournament to Dayton.

== Offseason ==
=== Departures ===
Name	Number	Pos.	Height	Weight	Year	Hometown	Reason for departure
Jermaine Harris	0	F	6'8"	230	Junior	Upper Marlboro, MD	Transferred to New Mexico State
Fatts Russell	1	G	5'10"	165	Senior	Philadelphia, PA	Graduate transferred to Maryland
Umberto Brusadin	14	G	6'0"	180	GS Senior	Latina, Italy	Walk-on; graduated
D.J. Johnson	23	F	6'7"	185	RS Junior	Brooklyn, NY	Transferred to Kent State
Brandon Borde	31	G	6'2"	190	Freshman	Foxborough, MA	Walk-on; did not return

=== Incoming transfers ===
Name	Number	Pos.	Height	Weight	Year	Hometown	Previous school
Ishmael El-Amin	42	G	6'3"	180	GS Senior	Minneapolis, MN	Ball State

=== Recruiting classes ===
==== 2021 recruiting class ====
College recruiting information
Name	Hometown	School	Height	Weight	Commit date
Abdou Samb; PF	Upper Marlboro, MD	Frederick Douglass (MD)	6 ft 8 in (2.03 m)	210 lb (95 kg)	Sep 10, 2020
Abdou Samb; PF	Recruit ratings: Scout: Rivals: (NR)				
Sebastian Thomas; PG	Providence, RI	Bishop Hendricken High School	6 ft 2 in (1.88 m)	190 lb (86 kg)	May 18, 2021
Sebastian Thomas; PG	Recruit ratings: Scout: Rivals: (NR)				
Overall recruit ranking:
Note: In many cases, Scout, Rivals, 247Sports, On3, and ESPN may conflict in their listings of height and weight.; In these cases, the average was taken. ESPN grades are on a 100-point scale.; Sources: "2021 Team Ranking". Rivals.

==== 2022 recruiting class ====
College recruiting information (2022)
Name	Hometown	School	Height	Weight	Commit date
Chance Stephens; SG	Riverside, CA	Polytechnic School	6 ft 3 in (1.91 m)	170 lb (77 kg)	Nov 12, 2020
Chance Stephens; SG	Recruit ratings: Scout: Rivals: (NR)				
Overall recruit ranking:
Note: In many cases, Scout, Rivals, 247Sports, On3, and ESPN may conflict in their listings of height and weight.; In these cases, the average was taken. ESPN grades are on a 100-point scale.; Sources: "2022 Team Ranking". Rivals.

== Roster ==
2021–22 Rhode Island Rams men's basketball team
Players
Coaches

Pos.	#	Name	Height	Weight	Year	Previous school	Hometown
G	0	Sebastian Thomas	6 ft 1 in (1.85 m)	180 lb (82 kg)	Fr	Bishop Hendricken	Providence, RI
F	1	Abdou Samb	6 ft 8 in (2.03 m)	210 lb (95 kg)	Fr	Frederick Douglass	Upper Marlboro, MD
G	2	Jeremy Sheppard	6 ft 1 in (1.85 m)	165 lb (75 kg)	RS Sr	John Marshall; Williston State College	Richmond, VA
G	4	Allen Betrand	6 ft 6 in (1.98 m)	205 lb (93 kg)	Sr	Massanutten Military Academy; Towson	Philadelphia, PA
F	5	Antwan Walker	6 ft 7 in (2.01 m)	230 lb (104 kg)	RS Sr	Massanutten Military Academy; Georgetown	Washington, D.C.
G	10	Ishmael Leggett	6 ft 2 in (1.88 m)	180 lb (82 kg)	So	St. John's College	Washington, D.C.
G	12	Malik Martin	6 ft 6 in (1.98 m)	210 lb (95 kg)	Sr	Curtis; Charlotte	Staten Island, NY
G	13	Tres Berry	6 ft 4 in (1.93 m)	190 lb (86 kg)	So	Scotland	Cleveland, TN
G	15	Jalen Carey	6 ft 3 in (1.91 m)	186 lb (84 kg)	RS Jr	Immaculate Conception (NJ); Syracuse	Harlem, NY
C	21	Makhi Mitchell	6 ft 9 in (2.06 m)	230 lb (104 kg)	RS Jr	Woodrow Wilson (DC); Maryland	Washington, D.C.
C	22	Makhel Mitchell	6 ft 10 in (2.08 m)	245 lb (111 kg)	RS Jr	Woodrow Wilson (DC); Maryland	Washington, D.C.
F	24	Ileri Ayo-Faleye	6 ft 7 in (2.01 m)	185 lb (84 kg)	So	Cedar Crest	Lebanon, PA
G	42	Ishmael El-Amin	6 ft 3 in (1.91 m)	180 lb (82 kg)	RS Sr	Hopkins	Minneapolis, MN

Head coach

- David Cox (William & Mary)

Assistant coach(es)

- Todd Bozeman (Rhode Island)
- T. J. Buchanan (Rhode Island)
- Austin Carroll (American)

Legend

- (C) Team captain
- (S) Suspended
- (I) Ineligible
- (W) Walk-on
- Injured
- Current redshirt

Roster
Last update: June 26, 2024

== Schedule and results ==
Date time, TV	Rank^{#}	Opponent^{#}	Result	Record	High points	High rebounds	High assists	Site (attendance) city, state
Exhibition
November 4, 2021*; 7:00 p.m.		Johnson & Wales	W 109–56		22 – Walker	11 – Makhi Mitchell	5 – Makhi Mitchell	Ryan Center (4,401); Kingston, RI
Non-conference regular season
November 9, 2021*; 7:00 p.m., ESPN+		Boston University	W 71–62	1–0	18 – Leggett	5 – 3 tied	3 – Sheppard	Ryan Center (5,133); Kingston, RI
November 12, 2021*; 6:00 p.m., ESPN+		Bryant; Sunshine Slam campus game	W 83–64	2–0	17 – Makhel Mitchell	18 – Makhi Mitchell	4 – Tie	Ryan Center (5,455); Kingston, RI
November 17, 2021*; 6:00 p.m., CBSSN		Boston College	W 57–49	3–0	12 – El-Amin	8 – Makhi Mitchell	3 – 2 tied	Ryan Center (5,421); Kingston, RI
November 20, 2021*; 7:30 p.m., FloSports		vs. Tulsa; Sunshine Slam semifinals	L 71–77	3–1	20 – Makhel Mitchell	6 – tied	3 – tied	Ocean Center (1,357); Daytona Beach, FL
November 21, 2021*; 5:00 p.m., FloSports		vs. Boston College; Sunshine Slam consolation	W 71–65	4–1	15 – 2 tied	5 – Makhi Mitchell	3 – 2 tied	Ocean Center; Daytona Beach, FL
November 23, 2021*; 7:00 p.m., ESPN+		at Florida Gulf Coast	L 66–67	4–2	16 – Makhel Mitchell	6 – 2 tied	4 – Sheppard	Alico Arena (2,231); Fort Myers, FL
November 27, 2021*; 4:00 p.m., ESPN+		Georgia State	W 94–59	5–2	21 – Sheppard	12 – Makhi Mitchell	6 – Sheppard	Ryan Center (4,132); Kingston, RI
December 1, 2021*; 7:00 p.m., ESPN+		at Harvard	W 64–57	6–2	16 – Leggett	9 – Martin	3 – 2 tied	Lavietes Pavilion (1,038); Boston, MA
December 4, 2021*; 2:00 p.m., CBSSN		at Providence; Ocean State Cup	L 52–66	6–3	10 – Sheppard	8 – Martin	3 – Thomas	Dunkin' Donuts Center (12,947); Providence, RI
December 7, 2021*; 6:00 p.m., ESPN+		Sacred Heart	W 72–62	7–3	14 – Makhel Mitchell	8 – Walker	5 – Thomas	Ryan Center (4,928); Kingston, RI
December 13, 2021*; 8:00 p.m., ESPN+		at Milwaukee	W 82–58	8–3	25 – Sheppard	10 – Makhi Mitchell	4 – Makhel Mitchell	UWM Panther Arena (2,380); Milwaukee, WI
December 19, 2021*; 2:00 p.m.		vs. College of Charleston; Holiday Hoops Fest	Canceled due to COVID-19					Entertainment and Sports Arena; Washington, D.C.
December 22, 2021*; 7:00 p.m., ESPN+		Brown; Ocean State Cup	Canceled due to COVID-19					Ryan Center; Kingston, RI
January 2, 2022*; 2:30 p.m.		American International	W 70–55	9–3	19 – Makhi Mitchell	11 – Martin	5 – Thomas	Ryan Center (3,662); Kingston, RI
Atlantic 10 regular season
January 5, 2022; 7:00 p.m., ESPN+		at George Mason	Postponed due to COVID-19					EagleBank Arena; Fairfax, VA
January 8, 2022; 2:00 p.m., CBSSN		at Davidson	L 68–72	9–4 (0–1)	19 – Makhel Mitchell	5 – Makhel Mitchell	5 – Walker	John M. Belk Arena (2,860); Davidson, NC
January 12, 2022; 7:00 p.m., ESPN+		Saint Joseph's	W 75–64	10–4 (1–1)	15 – Makhel Mitchell	12 – Martin	6 – Sheppard	Ryan Center (3,597); Kingston, RI
January 15, 2022; 4:30 p.m., USA		at UMass	W 81–68	11–4 (2–1)	20 – Makhel Mitchell	7 – Martin	8 – Makhi Mitchell	Mullins Center (2,181); Amherst, MA
January 19, 2022; 7:00 p.m., ESPN+		La Salle; Rescheduled from January 2	W 56–54	12–4 (3–1)	10 – Makhi Mitchell	9 – Walker	3 – Sheppard	Ryan Center (4,379); Kingston, RI
January 22, 2022; 12:30 p.m., USA		George Washington	L 61–63	12–5 (3–2)	12 – Sheppard	10 – Makhi Mitchell	2 – tied	Ryan Center (4,667); Kingston, RI
January 25, 2022; 6:30 p.m., CBSSN		Richmond	L 63–70	12–6 (3–3)	12 – Walker	12 – Makhi Mitchell	7 – Thomas	Ryan Center (6,259); Kingston, RI
January 28, 2022; 7:00 p.m., ESPN2		at Dayton	L 51–53	12–7 (3–4)	12 – Makhi Mitchell	11 – Makhi Mitchell	4 – Thomas	UD Arena (13,407); Dayton, OH
February 2, 2022; 7:00 p.m., ESPN+		at Fordham	L 55–61	12–8 (3–5)	13 – Makhel Mitchell	9 – Makhel Mitchell	3 – Carey	Rose Hill Gymnasium (1,034); The Bronx, NY
February 5, 2022; 2:00 p.m., ESPN+		UMass	L 67–78	12–9 (3–6)	21 – Leggett	13 – Makhi Mitchell	6 – Makhi Mitchell	Ryan Center (5,847); Kingston, RI
February 8, 2022; 7:00 p.m., CBSSN		at VCU	L 64–73	12–10 (3–7)	12 – Makhel Mitchell	10 – Makhel Mitchell	7 – Sheppard	Siegel Center (6,624); Richmond, VA
February 12, 2022; 2:00 p.m., ESPNU		Davidson	W 72–65	13–10 (4–7)	23 – Sheppard	11 – Makhi Mitchell	4 – Walker	Ryan Center (4,734); Kingston, RI
February 14, 2022; 9:00 p.m., CBSSN		Dayton; Rescheduled from December 30	L 57–63	13–11 (4–8)	9 – 3 tied	11 – Makhi Mitchell	4 – Sheppard	Ryan Center (4,714); Kingston, RI
February 19, 2022; 7:00 p.m., ESPN+		at George Washington	L 61–72	13–12 (4–9)	15 – Makhel Mitchell	10 – Makhi Mitchell	6 – Sheppard	Charles E. Smith Center (1,604); Washington, D.C.
February 22, 2022; 7:00 p.m., CBSSN		at St. Bonaventure	L 55–73	13–13 (4–10)	14 – Makhi Mitchell	9 – Makhi Mitchell	2 – 4 tied	Reilly Center (3,833); Olean, NY
February 26, 2022; 12:30 p.m., USA		Duquesne	W 70–54	14–13 (5–10)	21 – El-Amin	7 – El-Amin	3 – Thomas	Ryan Center (4,668); Kingston, RI
March 2, 2022; 7:00 p.m., ESPN+		Saint Louis	L 74–80	14–14 (5–11)	16 – Sheppard	8 – Makhi Mitchell	3 – Makhi Mitchell	Ryan Center (4,611); Kingston, RI
March 5, 2022; 2:00 p.m., ESPN+		at Saint Joseph's	L 60–70	14–15 (5–12)	11 – Martin	6 – Martin	3 – Thomas	Hagan Arena (2,001); Philadelphia, PA
A-10 tournament
March 9, 2022; 3:30 p.m., ESPN+	(11)	vs. (14) Duquesne; First round	W 79–77	15–15	17 – Walker	11 – Walker	6 – Sheppard	Capital One Arena (2,283); Washington, D.C.
March 10, 2022; 8:30 p.m., USA	(11)	vs. (6) Richmond; Quarterfinals	L 59–64	15–16	20 – Martin	9 – Martin	4 – Sheppard	Capital One Arena (6,543); Washington, D.C.
*Non-conference game. ^{#}Rankings from AP poll. (#) Tournament seedings in parentheses. All times are in Eastern.
