= 2021–22 La Salle Explorers men's basketball team =

American college basketball season

2021–22 La Salle Explorers men's basketball
- Conference: Atlantic 10 Conference
- Record: 11–19 (5–13 A–10)
- Head coach: Ashley Howard (4th season)
- Assistant coaches: Kyle Griffin; Donnie Carr; Jamal Robinson
- Home arena: Tom Gola Arena

2021–22 Atlantic 10 men's basketball standings
	Conf.				Overall
Team	W		L	PCT	W		L	PCT
Davidson	15	–	3	.833	27	–	7	.794
Dayton	14	–	4	.778	24	–	11	.686
VCU	14	–	4	.778	22	–	10	.688
St. Bonaventure	12	–	5	.706	23	–	10	.697
Saint Louis	12	–	6	.667	23	–	12	.657
Richmond †	10	–	8	.556	24	–	13	.649
George Washington	8	–	9	.471	12	–	18	.400
Fordham	8	–	10	.444	16	–	16	.500
George Mason	7	–	9	.438	14	–	16	.467
UMass	7	–	11	.389	15	–	17	.469
Rhode Island	5	–	12	.294	15	–	16	.484
La Salle	5	–	13	.278	11	–	19	.367
Saint Joseph's	5	–	13	.278	11	–	19	.367
Duquesne	1	–	16	.059	6	–	24	.200
† 2022 A-10 tournament winner

The 2021–22 La Salle Explorers men's basketball team represented La Salle University during the 2021–22 NCAA Division I men's basketball season. The Explorers, led by fourth-year head coach Ashley Howard, played their home games at Tom Gola Arena in Philadelphia, Pennsylvania as members of the Atlantic 10 Conference. They finished the season 11–19, 5–13 in A-10 play to finish in a tie for 12th place. As the No. 12 seed in the A-10 tournament, they defeated Saint Joseph's in the first round before losing to Saint Louis in the second round.

On March 21, 2022, the school fired head coach Ashley Howard.

== Previous season ==
In a season limited due to the ongoing COVID-19 pandemic, the Explorers finished the 2020–21 season 9–16, 6–11 in A-10 play to finish in 12th place. They lost in the first round of the A-10 tournament to Saint Joseph's.

== Offseason ==
=== Departures ===
Name	Number	Pos.	Height	Weight	Year	Hometown	Reason for departure
David Beatty	1	G	6'2"	200	Senior	Philadelphia, PA	Graduate transferred to North Carolina A&T
Scott Spencer	2	G	6'6"	210	RS Senior	Suffolk, VA	Graduate transferred to Tulane
Derrius Ward	10	G	6'6"	185	Freshman	Philadelphia, PA	Transferred to Harcum College
Jared Kimbrough	24	F	6'8"	225	Junior	Neptune, NJ	Transferred to Hartford

=== Incoming transfers ===
Name	Num	Pos.	Height	Weight	Year	Hometown	Previous School
Josh Nickelberry	10	G	6'4"	205	Junior	Fayetteville, NC	Louisville
Mamadou Doucoure	14	F	6'9"	250	RS Senior	Bamako, Mali	Rutgers

=== 2021 recruiting class ===
College recruiting information
Name	Hometown	School	Height	Weight	Commit date
Daeshon Shepherd; SG	Philadelphia, PA	Archbishop Wood High School	6 ft 5 in (1.96 m)	190 lb (86 kg)	
Daeshon Shepherd; SG	Recruit ratings: Scout: Rivals: (NR)				
Andrés Marrero; SG	Caracas, Venezuela	Upper Room Christian School	6 ft 5 in (1.96 m)	200 lb (91 kg)	Jun 26, 2019
Andrés Marrero; SG	Recruit ratings: Scout: Rivals: (NR)				
Khalil Brantley; PG	Charlotte, NC	Our Saviour Lutheran School	6 ft 0 in (1.83 m)	160 lb (73 kg)	Jun 26, 2021
Khalil Brantley; PG	Recruit ratings: Scout: Rivals: 247Sports: (NR)				
Overall recruit ranking:
Note: In many cases, Scout, Rivals, 247Sports, On3, and ESPN may conflict in their listings of height and weight.; In these cases, the average was taken. ESPN grades are on a 100-point scale.; Sources: "2021 Team Ranking". Rivals.

== Roster ==
2021–22 La Salle Explorers men's basketball team
Players
Coaches

Pos.	#	Name	Height	Weight	Year	Previous school	Hometown
G	0	Andrés Marrero	6 ft 5 in (1.96 m)	200 lb (91 kg)	Fr	Upper Room Christian School (NY)	Caracas, Venezuela
G	1	Charles Ireland (W)	6 ft 2 in (1.88 m)	165 lb (75 kg)	Fr	La Salle College	Glenside, PA
G	2	Jhamir Brickus	5 ft 11 in (1.8 m)	205 lb (93 kg)	So	Coatesville	Coatesville, PA
G	3	Anwar Gill	6 ft 4 in (1.93 m)	205 lb (93 kg)	So	Montverde Academy	Washington, D.C.
G	4	Sherif Kenney	6 ft 4 in (1.93 m)	215 lb (98 kg)	Jr	Orr Academy	Washington, D.C.
G	5	Jack Clark	6 ft 8 in (2.03 m)	200 lb (91 kg)	RS Jr	Cheltenham	Wyncote, PA
G	10	Josh Nickelberry	6 ft 4 in (1.93 m)	205 lb (93 kg)	Jr	Northwood Temple Academy; Louisville	Fayetteville, NC
C	11	Tegra Izay	6 ft 10 in (2.08 m)	265 lb (120 kg)	So	Archbishop Carroll	Montreal, Canada
G	12	Kyle Thompson (W)	5 ft 10 in (1.78 m)	200 lb (91 kg)	RS Jr	Archbishop Wood; West Chester	Horsham, PA
G	13	Daeshon Shepherd	6 ft 5 in (1.96 m)	200 lb (91 kg)	Fr	Archbishop Wood	Philadelphia, PA
F	14	Mamadou Doucoure	6 ft 9 in (2.06 m)	250 lb (113 kg)	RS Sr	Our Savior New American School; Rutgers	Bamako, Mali
F/C	21	Clifton Moore	6 ft 10 in (2.08 m)	240 lb (109 kg)	RS Sr	Hatboro-Horsham; Indiana	Horsham, PA
G	24	Christian Ray	6 ft 6 in (1.98 m)	215 lb (98 kg)	Jr	Haverford School	Gap, PA
G	25	Andrew Lafond (W)	5 ft 10 in (1.78 m)	150 lb (68 kg)	Sr	St. Joseph's Prep	Philadelphia, PA
G	30	Brandon Dwyer (W)	6 ft 3 in (1.91 m)	180 lb (82 kg)	Fr	Sanford School	Newark, DE
G	55	Khlil Brantley	6 ft 1 in (1.85 m)	175 lb (79 kg)	Fr	Our Savior Lutheran	Bronx, NY

Head coach

- Ashley Howard (Drexel)

Assistant coach(es)

- Kyle Griffin (Siena)
- Donnie Carr (La Salle)
- Jamal Robinson (Virginia)

Legend

- (C) Team captain
- (S) Suspended
- (I) Ineligible
- (W) Walk-on
- Injured
- Current redshirt

Roster

== Schedule and results ==
Date time, TV	Rank^{#}	Opponent^{#}	Result	Record	Site (attendance) city, state
Non-conference regular season
November 9, 2021*; 8:00 p.m., ESPN+		Sacred Heart	L 81–86 ^{OT}	0–1	Tom Gola Arena (1,637); Philadelphia, PA
November 13, 2021*; 7:00 p.m., ESPN+		Albany	W 67–64	1–1	Tom Gola Arena; Philadelphia, PA
November 17, 2021*; 7:00 p.m., FloHoops		at Delaware	L 82–85 ^{OT}	1–2	Bob Carpenter Center (2,032); Newark, DE
November 20, 2021*; 4:00 p.m., ESPN+		Army	W 61–58	2–2	Tom Gola Arena (1,712); Philadelphia, PA
November 28, 2021*; 6:00 p.m., ESPN2		vs. No. 7 Villanova; Philadelphia Big 5	L 46–72	2–3	Palestra (5,841); Philadelphia, PA
December 1, 2021*; 7:00 p.m., ESPN+		at Temple; Philadelphia Big 5	L 57-73	2–4	Liacouras Center (4,025); Philadelphia, PA
December 4, 2021*; 2:00 p.m., ESPN+		Holy Cross	W 84–65	3–4	Tom Gola Arena (1,326); Philadelphia, PA
December 7, 2021*; 7:00 p.m., ESPN+		Fairleigh Dickinson	W 81–55	4–4	Tom Gola Arena (1,172); Philadelphia, PA
December 11, 2021*; 2:00 p.m., ESPN+		Penn; Philadelphia Big 5	W 76-74	5–4	Tom Gola Arena (2,617); Philadelphia, PA
December 18, 2021*; 2:00 p.m., ESPN+		at Bucknell	L 70-82	5–5	Sojka Pavilion (1,230); Lewisburg, PA
December 21, 2021*; 4:00 p.m., ESPN+		Drexel	Canceled due to COVID-19		Tom Gola Arena; Philadelphia, PA
Atlantic 10 regular season
December 30, 2021; 7:00 p.m., ESPN+		Fordham	L 61–69	5–6 (0–1)	Tom Gola Arena (1,147); Philadelphia, PA
January 8, 2022; 2:00 p.m., USA		VCU	L 66–85	5–7 (0–2)	Tom Gola Arena (1,721); Philadelphia, PA
January 11, 2022; 7:00 p.m., ESPN+		St. Bonaventure	L 76–80 ^{OT}	5–8 (0–3)	Tom Gola Arena (1,321); Philadelphia, PA
January 17, 2022; 4:00 p.m., CBSSN		at Saint Joseph's	W 75–64	6–8 (1–3)	Hagan Arena (1,795); Philadelphia, PA
January 19, 2022; 7:00 p.m., ESPN+		at Rhode Island; Rescheduled from January 2	L 54–56	6–9 (1–4)	Ryan Center (4,379); Kingston, RI
January 22, 2022; 4:30 p.m., USA		Richmond	L 56–64	6–10 (1–5)	Tom Gola Arena (2,137); Philadelphia, PA
January 26, 2022; 7:00 p.m., ESPN+		UMass	L 71–77	6–11 (1–6)	Tom Gola Arena (1,389); Philadelphia, PA
January 29, 2022; 12:00 p.m., USA		at No. 25 Davidson	L 69–77	6–12 (1–7)	John M. Belk Arena (3,938); Davidson, NC
February 2, 2022; 7:00 p.m., ESPN+		at George Washington	L 87–89	6–13 (1–8)	Charles E. Smith Center (919); Washington, D.C.
February 5, 2022; 2:00 p.m., ESPN+		George Mason	W 83–78	7–13 (2–8)	Tom Gola Arena (2,217); Philadelphia, PA
February 8, 2022; 7:00 p.m., ESPN+		Saint Louis	L 57–75	7–14 (2–9)	Tom Gola Arena (1,121); Philadelphia, PA
February 12, 2022; 4:30 p.m., ESPN+		at Richmond	L 63–77	7–15 (2–10)	Robins Center (6,801); Richmond, VA
February 16, 2022; 8:00 p.m., ESPN+		at Saint Louis; Rescheduled from January 5	L 64–90	7–16 (2–11)	Chaifetz Arena (4,671); St. Louis, MO
February 19, 2022; 12:00 p.m., ESPN+		at UMass	L 74–80	7–17 (2–12)	Mullins Center (2,009); Amherst, MA
February 23, 2022; 7:00 p.m., ESPN+		at Fordham	L 54–60	7–18 (2–13)	Rose Hill Gymnasium (687); Bronx, NY
February 26, 2022; 2:00 p.m., ESPN+		Dayton	W 62–60	8–18 (3–13)	Tom Gola Arena (2,473); Philadelphia, PA
March 2, 2022; 7:00 p.m., ESPN+		Saint Joseph's	W 49–48	9–18 (4–13)	Tom Gola Arena (2,812); Philadelphia, PA
March 5, 2022; 2:00 p.m., ESPN+		at Duquesne	W 85–76	10–18 (5–13)	UPMC Cooper Fieldhouse (2,003); Pittsburgh, PA
Atlantic 10 tournament
March 9, 2022; 1:00 p.m., ESPN+	(12)	vs. (13) Saint Joseph's; First round	W 63–56	11–18	Capital One Arena; Washington, D.C.
March 10, 2022; 2:30 p.m., USA/Peacock	(12)	vs. (5) Saint Louis; Second round	L 51-71	11–19	Capital One Arena; Washington, D.C.
*Non-conference game. ^{#}Rankings from AP Poll. (#) Tournament seedings in parentheses. All times are in Eastern Time.
