= 2021–22 Saint Joseph's Hawks men's basketball team =

2021–22 Saint Joseph's Hawks men's basketball
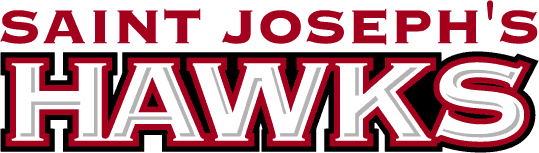
- Conference: Atlantic 10 Conference
- Record: 11–19 (5–13 A–10)
- Head coach: Billy Lange (3rd season)
- Assistant coaches: John Griffin III; Justin Scott; Brenden Straughn
- Home arena: Hagan Arena

2021–22 Atlantic 10 men's basketball standings
	Conf.				Overall
Team	W		L	PCT	W		L	PCT
Davidson	15	–	3	.833	27	–	7	.794
Dayton	14	–	4	.778	24	–	11	.686
VCU	14	–	4	.778	22	–	10	.688
St. Bonaventure	12	–	5	.706	23	–	10	.697
Saint Louis	12	–	6	.667	23	–	12	.657
Richmond †	10	–	8	.556	24	–	13	.649
George Washington	8	–	9	.471	12	–	18	.400
Fordham	8	–	10	.444	16	–	16	.500
George Mason	7	–	9	.438	14	–	16	.467
UMass	7	–	11	.389	15	–	17	.469
Rhode Island	5	–	12	.294	15	–	16	.484
La Salle	5	–	13	.278	11	–	19	.367
Saint Joseph's	5	–	13	.278	11	–	19	.367
Duquesne	1	–	16	.059	6	–	24	.200
† 2022 A-10 tournament winner

The 2021–22 Saint Joseph's Hawks basketball team represented Saint Joseph's University during the 2021–22 NCAA Division I men's basketball season. The Hawks, led by third-year head coach Billy Lange, played their home games at Hagan Arena in Philadelphia, Pennsylvania as members of the Atlantic 10 Conference.

== Previous season ==
In a season limited due to the ongoing COVID-19 pandemic, the Hawks finished the 2020–21 season 5–15 overall, 3–9 in A-10 play to finish in 13th place. As the No. 13 seed in the A-10 tournament, they defeated La Salle in the first round before losing to UMass in the second round.

== Offseason ==
=== Departures ===
Name	Number	Pos.	Height	Weight	Year	Hometown	Reason for departure
Ryan Daly	1	G	6'5"	225	RS Senior	Havertown, PA	Graduated/went undrafted in 2021 NBA draft
Myles Douglas	2	F	6'7"	215	Junior	Edgewood, MD	Transferred to Morgan State
Greg Foster Jr.	5	G	6'5"	200	RS Sophomore	Milwaukee, WI	
Anthony Longpré	12	F	6'10"	250	Senior	L'Assomption, QC	Left the team for personal reasons
Ethan Griffith	34	G	6'3"	190	Senior	Hillsborough, NJ	Walk-on; graduate transferred

=== Incoming transfers ===
Name	Num	Pos.	Height	Weight	Year	Hometown	Previous School
Charles Coleman	32	F/C	7'0"	255	Junior	Boston, MA	East Carolina
Ejike Obinna	50	F/C	6'10"	243	RS Senior	Enugu, Nigeria	Vanderbilt

=== Recruiting classes ===
==== 2021 recruiting class ====
College recruiting information
Name	Hometown	School	Height	Weight	Commit date
Erik Reynolds; SG	Potomac, MD	Bullis School	6 ft 2 in (1.88 m)	170 lb (77 kg)	Aug 29, 2020
Erik Reynolds; SG	Recruit ratings: Scout: Rivals: 247Sports: ESPN: (79)				
Kacper Klaczek; SF	Chorzów, Poland	Long Island Lutheran	6 ft 8 in (2.03 m)	215 lb (98 kg)	Feb 1, 2021
Kacper Klaczek; SF	Recruit ratings: Scout: Rivals: 247Sports: ESPN: (NR)				
Overall recruit ranking:
Note: In many cases, Scout, Rivals, 247Sports, On3, and ESPN may conflict in their listings of height and weight.; In these cases, the average was taken. ESPN grades are on a 100-point scale.; Sources: "Saint Joseph's Hawks". ESPN.; "2021 Team Ranking". Rivals.

==== 2022 recruiting class ====
College recruiting information (2022)
Name	Hometown	School	Height	Weight	Commit date
Christian Winborne; PG	Baltimore, MD	Gilman High School	6 ft 3 in (1.91 m)	175 lb (79 kg)	Jul 20, 2021
Christian Winborne; PG	Recruit ratings: Scout: Rivals: 247Sports: ESPN: (NR)				
Rasheer Fleming; PF	Camden, NJ	Camden High School	6 ft 8 in (2.03 m)	N/A	Jun 28, 2021
Rasheer Fleming; PF	Recruit ratings: Scout: Rivals: 247Sports: ESPN: (NR)				
Overall recruit ranking:
Note: In many cases, Scout, Rivals, 247Sports, On3, and ESPN may conflict in their listings of height and weight.; In these cases, the average was taken. ESPN grades are on a 100-point scale.; Sources: "Saint Joseph's Hawks". ESPN.; "2022 Team Ranking". Rivals.

== Roster ==
2021–22 Saint Joseph's Hawks men's basketball team
Players
Coaches

Pos.	#	Name	Height	Weight	Year	Previous school	Hometown
G	0	Kacper Klaczek	6 ft 8 in (2.03 m)	220 lb (100 kg)	Fr	Long Island Lutheran High School	Chorzów, Poland
G	1	Dahmir Bishop	6 ft 5 in (1.96 m)	190 lb (86 kg)	Jr	Xavier	Philadelphia, Pennsylvania
G	2	Erik Reynolds II	6 ft 2 in (1.88 m)	170 lb (77 kg)	Fr	Bullis School	Potomac, Maryland
G	3	Cameron Brown	6 ft 5 in (1.96 m)	220 lb (100 kg)	Jr	Eleanor Roosevelt High School	Laurel, Maryland
C	10	Anton Jansson	6 ft 11 in (2.11 m)	240 lb (109 kg)	So	Golden State Prep	Stockholm, Sweden
G	11	Rahmir Moore	6 ft 3 in (1.91 m)	205 lb (93 kg)	Jr	RISE Prep	Philadelphia, Pennsylvania
F	13	Jadrian Tracey	6 ft 5 in (1.96 m)	205 lb (93 kg)	So	West Oaks Academy	Fort Myers, Florida
G	20	Chris Arizin (W)	6 ft 3 in (1.91 m)	195 lb (88 kg)	So	St. Joseph's Prep	Media, Pennsylvania
G	21	Nikkos Luna-Nash (W)	6 ft 0 in (1.83 m)	155 lb (70 kg)	So	Shorecrest Prep	Seminole, Florida
G/F	22	Jordan Hall	6 ft 7 in (2.01 m)	215 lb (98 kg)	So	Neumann Goretti High School	Wildwood, New Jersey
G	24	Jack Forrest	6 ft 5 in (1.96 m)	205 lb (93 kg)	Jr	Columbia	Bala Cynwyd, Pennsylvania
G	30	Brian Geatens (W)	6 ft 0 in (1.83 m)	175 lb (79 kg)	So	St. Joseph's Prep	Harleysville, Pennsylvania
F/C	32	Charles Coleman	7 ft 0 in (2.13 m)	245 lb (111 kg)	Jr	East Carolina	Boston, Massachusetts
F	33	Taylor Funk	6 ft 8 in (2.03 m)	215 lb (98 kg)	RS Sr	Manheim Central High School	Lancaster, Pennsylvania
F/C	50	Ejike Obinna	6 ft 10 in (2.08 m)	245 lb (111 kg)	RS Sr	Vanderbilt	Enugu, Nigeria

Head coach

- Billy Lange (Rowan)

Assistant coach(es)

- John Griffin III (Bucknell)
- Justin Scott (East Stroudsburg)
- Brenden Straughn (Hood)

Legend

- (C) Team captain
- (S) Suspended
- (I) Ineligible
- (W) Walk-on
- Injured
- Current redshirt

Roster

== Schedule and results ==
Date time, TV	Rank^{#}	Opponent^{#}	Result	Record	High points	High rebounds	High assists	Site (attendance) city, state
Exhibition
November 4, 2021*; 7:00 p.m.		USciences	W 83-54		15 – Hall	8 – Hall	4 – Tie	Hagan Arena (822); Philadelphia, PA
Non-conference regular season
November 9, 2021*; 8:00 p.m., ESPN+		Maryland Eastern Shore	W 69–67	1–0	22 – Funk	9 – Hall	11 – Hall	Hagan Arena (1,617); Philadelphia, PA
November 13, 2021*; 1:00 p.m., ESPN+		Mount St. Mary's	W 80–60	2–0	18 – Funk	15 – Obinna	4 – Tied	Hagan Arena (1,513); Philadelphia, PA
November 17, 2021*; 7:00 p.m., ESPN+		Drexel	L 75–78	2–1	20 – Hall	7 – Hall	6 – Hall	Hagan Arena (1,669); Philadelphia, PA
November 20, 2021*; 1:00 p.m., ESPN+		Monmouth	L 75–87	2–2	24 – Hall	10 – Hall	5 – Hall	Hagan Arena (1,400); Philadelphia, PA
November 25, 2021*; 9:30 p.m., ESPN2		vs. No. 24 USC; Wooden Legacy semifinal	L 55–70	2–3	18 – Obinna	10 – Obinna	6 – Hall	Anaheim Convention Center; Anaheim, CA
November 26, 2021*; 9:00 p.m., ESPNU		vs. Georgetown; Wooden Legacy 3rd place game	W 77–74	3–3	29 – Funk	7 – Funk	8 – Hall	Anaheim Convention Center; Anaheim, CA
December 1, 2021*; 7:00 p.m., ESPN+		Binghamton	W 79–57	4–3	15 – Hall	12 – Hall	3 – Tied	Hagan Arena; Philadelphia, PA
December 4, 2021*; 12:00 p.m., FS1		at No. 6 Villanova; Holy War	L 52–81	4–4	22 – Hall	6 – Funk	5 – Hall	Finneran Pavilion; Villanova, PA
December 8, 2021*; 7:00 p.m., ESPN+		Penn	W 78–71	5–4	33 – Hall	9 – Tied	7 – Hall	Hagan Arena; Philadelphia, PA
December 11, 2021*; 1:00 p.m., ESPN+		Temple; Rivalry	W 68–49	6–4	26 – Hall	13 – Funk	5 – Hall	Hagan Arena; Philadelphia, PA
December 18, 2021*; 3:00 p.m., ESPN+		at Bradley	L 73–77	6–5	20 – Funk	9 – Funk	12 – Hall	Carver Arena (3,827); Peoria, IL
December 22, 2021*; 6:00 p.m., ESPN+		Holy Cross	Canceled due to COVID-19 protocols					Hagan Arena; Philadelphia, PA
Atlantic 10 regular season
December 30, 2021; 7:00 p.m., ESPN+		at Richmond	W 83–56	7–5 (1–0)	18 – Funk	14 – Obinna	8 – Hall	Robins Center (5,003); Richmond, VA
January 5, 2022; 7:00 p.m., ESPN+		Davidson	L 73–88	7–6 (1–1)	17 – Bishop	8 – Funk	6 – Hall	Hagan Arena (750); Philadelphia, PA
January 12, 2022; 7:00 p.m., ESPN+		at Rhode Island	L 64–75	7–7 (1–2)	18 – Obinna	11 – Obinna	7 – Hall	Ryan Center (3,597); Kingston, RI
January 17, 2022; 4:00 p.m., CBSSN		La Salle	L 64–75	7–8 (1–3)	16 – Funk	9 – Funk	4 – Hall	Hagan Arena (1,795); Philadelphia, PA
January 19, 2022; 7:00 p.m., ESPN+		George Washington; Rescheduled from January 2	W 72–61	8–8 (2–3)	22 – Funk	12 – Obinna	9 – Hall	Hagan Arena (777); Philadelphia, PA
January 22, 2022; 2:30 p.m., NBCU		at VCU	L 54–70	8–9 (2–4)	22 – Funk	7 – Hall	5 – Hall	Siegel Center (7,391); Richmond, VA
January 24, 2022; 7:00 p.m., ESPN+		at George Mason; Rescheduled from January 8	L 71–77	8–10 (2–5)	18 – Reynolds	9 – Hall	9 – Hall	EagleBank Arena (2,436); Fairfax, VA
January 26, 2022; 7:00 p.m., ESPN+		Duquesne	W 72–61	9–10 (3–5)	18 – Hall	10 – Hall	6 – Hall	Hagan Arena (1,278); Philadelphia, PA
January 29, 2022; 2:00 p.m., ESPN+		at St. Bonaventure	L 69–80	9–11 (3–6)	21 – Reynolds	7 – Obinna	6 – Hall	Reilly Center (4,860); Olean, NY
February 5, 2022; 7:00 p.m., ESPN+		Fordham	W 72–69	10–11 (4–6)	23 – Reynolds	10 – Hall	5 – Hall	Hagan Arena (1,707); Philadelphia, PA
February 9, 2022; 7:00 p.m., ESPN+		at Davidson	L 67–73 ^{OT}	10–12 (4–7)	20 – Reynolds	13 – Obinna	5 – Hall	John M. Belk Arena (3,245); Davidson, NC
February 12, 2022; 7:00 p.m., ESPN+		at UMass	L 67–69	10–13 (4–8)	15 – Brown	7 – Funk	7 – Hall	Mullins Center (3,127); Amherst, MA
February 16, 2022; 7:00 p.m., ESPN+		George Mason	L 70–75 ^{OT}	10–14 (4–9)	17 – Hall	9 – Obinna	6 – Hall	Hagan Arena (1,016); Philadelphia, PA
February 19, 2022; 1:00 p.m., ESPN+		Dayton	L 62–74	10–15 (4–10)	16 – Reynolds	10 – Obinna	4 – Reynolds	Hagan Arena (2,361); Philadelphia, PA
February 22, 2022; 8:00 p.m., ESPN+		at Saint Louis	L 61–72	10–16 (4–11)	17 – Reynolds	14 – Funk	4 – Reynolds	Chaifetz Arena (4,435); St. Louis, MO
February 26, 2022; 6:00 p.m., CBSSN		St. Bonaventure	L 52–54	10–17 (4–12)	19 – Funk	10 – Funk	4 – Obinna	Hagan Arena (2,356); Philadelphia, PA
March 2, 2022; 7:00 p.m., ESPN+		at La Salle	L 48–49	10–18 (4–13)	14 – Obinna	18 – Obinna	5 – Hall	Tom Gola Arena (2,812); Philadelphia, PA
March 5, 2022; 2:00 p.m., ESPN+		Rhode Island	W 70–60	11–18 (5–13)	27 – Reynolds	8 – Hall	5 – Brown	Hagan Arena (2,001); Philadelphia, PA
A-10 tournament
March 9, 2022; 1:00 p.m., ESPN+	(13)	vs. (12) La Salle; First round	L 56–63	11–19	18 – Coleman	14 – Obinna	6 – Hall	Capital One Arena (2,283); Washington, D.C.
*Non-conference game. ^{#}Rankings from AP Poll. (#) Tournament seedings in parentheses. All times are in Eastern Time.
