= 2021–22 Fordham Rams men's basketball team =

2021–22 Fordham Rams men's basketball
- Conference: Atlantic 10
- Record: 16–16 (8–10 A–10)
- Head coach: Kyle Neptune (1st season)
- Associate head coach: Keith Urgo
- Assistant coaches: Tray Woodall; Ronald Ramón
- Home arena: Rose Hill Gymnasium

2021–22 Atlantic 10 men's basketball standings
	Conf.				Overall
Team	W		L	PCT	W		L	PCT
Davidson	15	–	3	.833	27	–	7	.794
Dayton	14	–	4	.778	24	–	11	.686
VCU	14	–	4	.778	22	–	10	.688
St. Bonaventure	12	–	5	.706	23	–	10	.697
Saint Louis	12	–	6	.667	23	–	12	.657
Richmond †	10	–	8	.556	24	–	13	.649
George Washington	8	–	9	.471	12	–	18	.400
Fordham	8	–	10	.444	16	–	16	.500
George Mason	7	–	9	.438	14	–	16	.467
UMass	7	–	11	.389	15	–	17	.469
Rhode Island	5	–	12	.294	15	–	16	.484
La Salle	5	–	13	.278	11	–	19	.367
Saint Joseph's	5	–	13	.278	11	–	19	.367
Duquesne	1	–	16	.059	6	–	24	.200
† 2022 A-10 tournament winner

The 2021–22 Fordham Rams men's basketball team represented Fordham University during the 2021–22 NCAA Division I men's basketball season. The Rams, led by first-year head coach Kyle Neptune, played their home games at Rose Hill Gymnasium in The Bronx, New York as a member of the Atlantic 10 Conference. They finished the season 16–16, 8–10 in A-10 play to finish in eighth place. They defeated George Washington in the second round of the A-10 tournament before losing to Davidson in the quarterfinals.

On April 20, 2022, following the retirement of Villanova head coach Jay Wright, Kyle Neptune left the school to become the head coach of the Wildcats. On April 26, the school named associate head coach Keith Urgo the team's new head coach.

== Previous season ==
In a season limited due to the ongoing COVID-19 pandemic, the Rams finished the 2020–21 season 2–12, 2–11 in A-10 play to finish in last place. They lost in the first round to George Washington in the Atlantic 10 tournament.

== Offseason ==
=== Departures ===
Name	Number	Pos.	Height	Weight	Year	Hometown	Reason for departure
Camron Cohn	0	G	6'4"	175	Sophomore	Houston, TX	Transferred to Santa Monica College
Julian Dozier	4	G	5'10"	170	Freshman	Detroit, MI	Transferred
Chris Austin	5	G	6'4"	205	Sophomore	Pasadena, CA	Transferred to Portland
Ty Perry	10	G	6'3"	215	Junior	Boston, MA	Transferred to Buffalo
Yame Butler	13	G	6'5"	190	Freshman	Greenbelt, MD	Transferred
Mason Williams	15	G	6'4"	184	Junior	Voorhees, NJ	Walk-on; transferred
Ivan Raut	20	F	6'7"	204	Senior	Kotor, Montenegro	Graduate transferred to Palm Beach Atlantic
Joel Soriano	22	F	6'11"	250	Sophomore	Yonkers, NY	Transferred to St. John's
Lazar Skoric	23	G	6'3"	190	Junior	Belgrade, Serbia	Transferred
Onyi Eyisi	30	F	6'9"	225	Junior	Napa Valley, CA	Transferred to Cal State Northridge
Peter Buquest	45	G	6'1"	165	Senior	Cincinnati, OH	Walk-on; graduated

=== Incoming transfers ===
Name	Number	Pos.	Height	Weight	Year	Hometown	Previous School
Kam'Ron Cunningham	0	G	6'7"	205	Senior	Greenville, SC	Mississippi Valley State
Darius Quisenberry	3	G	6'1"	188	Senior	Springfield, OH	Youngstown State
DJ Gordon	4	G	6'5"	175	Sophomore	Pittsburgh, PA	Penn State
Antonio Daye, Jr.	5	G	6'3"	188	Senior	Durham, NC	FIU
Rostyslav Novitskyi	15	C	6'10"	225	Junior	Kyiv, Ukraine	Seward County CC
Patrick Kelly	23	F	6'8"	215	RS Sophomore	Raleigh, NC	Penn State
Antrell Charlton	24	G	6'3"		Junior	Wesley Chapel, FL	Indian River State College

=== Recruiting classes ===
==== 2021 recruiting class ====
College recruiting information
Name	Hometown	School	Height	Weight	Commit date
Ahmad Harrison; PG	Fort Washington, MD	National Christian Academy	6 ft 1 in (1.85 m)	175 lb (79 kg)	Apr 26, 2021
Ahmad Harrison; PG	Recruit ratings: No ratings found				
Overall recruit ranking:
Note: In many cases, Scout, Rivals, 247Sports, On3, and ESPN may conflict in their listings of height and weight.; In these cases, the average was taken. ESPN grades are on a 100-point scale.; Sources: "2021 Team Ranking". Rivals.

==== 2022 recruiting class ====
College recruiting information (2022)
Name	Hometown	School	Height	Weight	Commit date
Will Richardson; PG	Oradell, NJ	Bergen Catholic High School	6 ft 2 in (1.88 m)	160 lb (73 kg)	Oct 11, 2021
Will Richardson; PG	Recruit ratings: Rivals: 247Sports:				
Overall recruit ranking:
Note: In many cases, Scout, Rivals, 247Sports, On3, and ESPN may conflict in their listings of height and weight.; In these cases, the average was taken. ESPN grades are on a 100-point scale.; Sources: "2022 Team Ranking". Rivals.

== Roster ==
2021–22 Fordham Rams men's basketball team
Players
Coaches

Pos.	#	Name	Height	Weight	Year	Previous school	Hometown
G	0	Kam'Ron Cunningham	6 ft 7 in (2.01 m)	205 lb (93 kg)	Sr	Mississippi Valley State	Greenville, South Carolina
F	1	Chuba Ohams	6 ft 9 in (2.06 m)	220 lb (100 kg)	RS Sr	Wadleigh High School	Bronx, New York
G	2	Jalen Cobb	6 ft 1 in (1.85 m)	165 lb (75 kg)	Jr	Columbia High School	Atlanta, Georgia
G	3	Darius Quisenberry	6 ft 1 in (1.85 m)	188 lb (85 kg)	Sr	Youngstown State	Springfield, Ohio
G	4	DJ Gordon	6 ft 5 in (1.96 m)	175 lb (79 kg)	So	Penn State	Pittsburgh, Pennsylvania
G	5	Antonio Daye, Jr.	6 ft 3 in (1.91 m)	200 lb (91 kg)	Sr	FIU	Durham, North Carolina
G	10	Kyle Rose	6 ft 3 in (1.91 m)	185 lb (84 kg)	Jr	Eleanor Roosevelt High School	Upper Marlboro, Maryland
G	14	Albe Evans (W)	5 ft 11 in (1.8 m)	160 lb (73 kg)	Fr	Schuylkill Haven High School	Schuylkill Haven, Pennsylvania
C	15	Rostyslav Novitskyi	6 ft 10 in (2.08 m)	225 lb (102 kg)	So	Seward County Community College	Kyiv, Ukraine
G	21	Josh Navarro	5 ft 10 in (1.78 m)	170 lb (77 kg)	RS Sr	Salt Lake Community College	Carolina, Puerto Rico
F	23	Patrick Kelly	6 ft 8 in (2.03 m)	223 lb (101 kg)	RS So	Penn State	Raleigh, North Carolina
G	24	Antrell Charlton	6 ft 5 in (1.96 m)	205 lb (93 kg)	Jr	Seward County Community College	Live Oak, Florida
F	30	Abdou Tsimbila	6 ft 9 in (2.06 m)	245 lb (111 kg)	So	Penn State	Yaoundé, Cameroon
G	50	Ahmad Harrison	6 ft 1 in (1.85 m)	190 lb (86 kg)	Fr	National Christian Academy	Baltimore, Maryland

Head coach

- Kyle Neptune (Lehigh)

Assistant coach(es)

- Keith Urgo (Fairfield)
- Tray Woodall (Pittsburgh)
- Ronald Ramón (Pittsburgh)

Legend

- (C) Team captain
- (S) Suspended
- (I) Ineligible
- (W) Walk-on
- Injured
- Current redshirt

Roster

== Schedule and results ==
Date time, TV	Rank^{#}	Opponent^{#}	Result	Record	Site (attendance) city, state
Non-conference regular season
November 9, 2021*; 7:00 p.m., ESPN+		Columbia	W 77–67	1–0	Rose Hill Gymnasium (1,100); Bronx, NY
November 12, 2021*; 7:00 p.m., ESPN+		at Manhattan; Battle of the Bronx	L 60–66	1–1	Draddy Gymnasium (1,675); Riverdale, NY
November 15, 2021*; 7:00 p.m., ESPN+		St. Thomas (MN)	W 84–78	2–1	Rose Hill Gymnasium (698); Bronx, NY
November 19, 2021*; 7:00 p.m., ESPN+		Maryland Eastern Shore	L 73–75 ^{2OT}	2–2	Rose Hill Gymnasium (795); Bronx, NY
November 22, 2021*; 5:00 p.m., FloHoops		vs. Akron; Gulf Coast Showcase First Round	W 63–43	3–2	Hertz Arena (370); Fort Myers, FL
November 23, 2021*; 7:30 p.m., FloHoops		vs. Delaware; Gulf Coast Showcase Semifinals	L 71–81	3–3	Hertz Arena (393); Fort Myers, FL
November 24, 2021*; 5:00 p.m., FloHoops		vs. Rice; Gulf Coast Showcase 3rd place game	W 84–74	4–3	Hertz Arena (150); Fort Myers, FL
November 28, 2021*; 1:00 p.m.		at Central Connecticut	W 89–83 ^{2OT}	5–3	William H. Detrick Gymnasium (1,128); New Britain, CT
December 1, 2021*; 7:00 p.m., SNY/ESPN+		St. Francis Brooklyn	W 68–46	6–3	Rose Hill Gymnasium (845); Bronx, NY
December 5, 2021*; 7:00 p.m., FS1		at St. John's; Rivalry	L 69–83	6–4	Carnesecca Arena (3,951); Queens, NY
December 9, 2021*; 7:00 p.m., ESPN+		LIU	W 73–57	7–4	Rose Hill Gymnasium (690); Bronx, NY
December 12, 2021*; 11:30 a.m., FloHoops		vs. Miami (FL); Basketball Hall of Fame Invitational	L 66–72	7–5	Barclays Center; Brooklyn, NY
December 22, 2021*; 4:00 p.m., ESPN+		Georgia Southern	Canceled due to COVID-19 protocols		Rose Hill Gymnasium; Bronx, NY
Atlantic 10 regular season
December 30, 2021; 7:00 p.m., ESPN+		at La Salle	W 69–61	8–5 (1–0)	Tom Gola Arena (1,147); Philadelphia, PA
January 12, 2022; 7:00 p.m., ESPN+		Duquesne	W 72–71	9–5 (2–0)	Rose Hill Gymnasium (0); Bronx, NY
January 15, 2022; 2:30 p.m., USA		at Saint Louis	L 45–63	9–6 (2–1)	Chaifetz Arena (4,486); St. Louis, MO
January 18, 2022; 7:00 p.m., SNY/ESPN+		Richmond; Rescheduled from January 8	L 70–83	9–7 (2–2)	Rose Hill Gymnasium (0); Bronx, NY
January 22, 2022; 7:00 p.m., ESPN+		Davidson	L 66–69	9–8 (2–3)	Rose Hill Gymnasium (0); Bronx, NY
January 25, 2022; 7:00 p.m., ESPN+		at Dayton; Rescheduled from January 19	L 61–68	9–9 (2–4)	UD Arena (13,407); Dayton, OH
January 30, 2022; 12:00 p.m., USA		at George Washington	L 55–64	9–10 (2–5)	Charles E. Smith Center (1,007); Washington, D.C.
February 2, 2022; 7:00 p.m., ESPN+		Rhode Island	W 61–55	10–10 (3–5)	Rose Hill Gymnasium (1,034); Bronx, NY
February 5, 2022; 7:00 p.m., ESPN+		at Saint Joseph's	L 69–72	10–11 (3–6)	Hagan Arena (1,707); Philadelphia, PA
February 8, 2022; 7:00 p.m., ESPN+		at St. Bonaventure; Rescheduled from January 5	L 51–76	10–12 (3–7)	Reilly Center (3,634); Olean, NY
February 12, 2022; 5:30 p.m., CBSSN		at Duquesne	W 65–54	11–12 (4–7)	UPMC Cooper Fieldhouse (2,002); Pittsburgh, PA
February 15, 2022; 7:00 p.m., SNY/ESPN+		VCU	L 61–66	11–13 (4–8)	Rose Hill Gymnasium (876); Bronx, NY
February 20, 2022; 2:30 p.m., USA		George Mason	W 50–47	12–13 (5–8)	Rose Hill Gymnasium (0); Bronx, NY
February 23, 2022; 7:00 p.m., ESPN+		La Salle	W 60–54	13–13 (6–8)	Rose Hill Gymnasium (687); Bronx, NY
February 26, 2022; 2:30 p.m., USA		at Davidson	L 45–66	13–14 (6–9)	John M. Belk Arena (3,842); Davidson, NC
February 28, 2022; 7:00 p.m., SNY/ESPN+		UMass; Rescheduled from January 2	W 85–73	14–14 (7–9)	Rose Hill Gymnasium (754); Bronx, NY
March 2, 2022; 7:00 p.m., ESPN+		at UMass	L 73–81	14–15 (7–10)	Mullins Center (2,186); Amherst, MA
March 5, 2022; 2:00 p.m., SNY/ESPN+		George Washington	W 70–66	15–15 (8–10)	Rose Hill Gymnasium (1,387); Bronx, NY
Atlantic 10 tournament
March 10, 2022; 12:00 p.m., USA	(8)	vs. (9) George Mason; Second round	W 54–49	16–15	Capital One Arena; Washington, D.C.
March 11, 2022; 12:00 p.m., USA	(8)	vs. (1) Davidson; Quarterfinals	L 56–74	16–16	Capital One Arena; Washington, D.C.
*Non-conference game. ^{#}Rankings from AP Poll. (#) Tournament seedings in parentheses. All times are in Eastern Time.

== See also ==
- 2021–22 Fordham Rams women's basketball team
