= Grant Golden (basketball) =

American basketball player (born 1998)

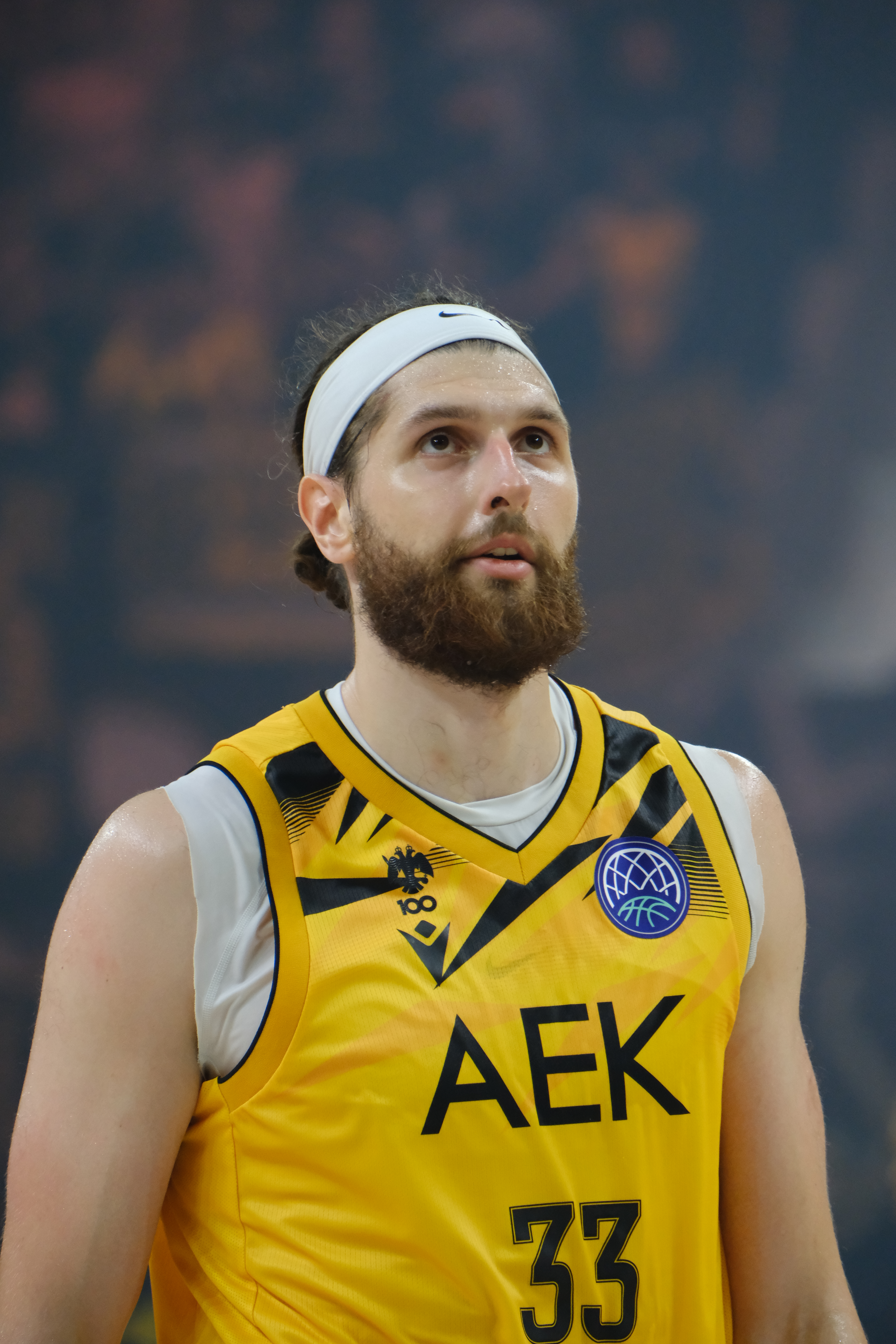
- Golden with AEK Athens in 2025

No. 33 – Élan Chalon
- Position: Center
- League: LNB Pro A

Personal information
- Born: January 15, 1998 (age 28) Richmond, Virginia, U.S.
- Listed height: 6 ft 10 in (2.08 m)
- Listed weight: 255 lb (116 kg)

Career information
- High school: Sherando (Stephens City, Virginia); St. James (Hagerstown, Maryland)
- College: Richmond (2016–2022)
- NBA draft: 2022: undrafted
- Playing career: 2022–present

Career history
- 2022–2023: Grand Rapids Gold
- 2023–2024: Cremona
- 2024–2025: AEK Athens
- 2025–2026: Manresa
- 2026–present: Élan Chalon

Career highlights
- Second-team All-Atlantic 10 (2020); 3× Third-team All-Atlantic 10 (2018, 2019, 2021); Atlantic 10 All-Rookie Team (2018)
- Stats at NBA.com
- Stats at Basketball Reference

Grant Golden (born January 15, 1998) is an American professional basketball player for Élan Chalon of the LNB Pro A. He played college basketball for the Richmond Spiders.

== High school career ==
After averaging 18.1 points and 7.7 rebounds per game as a sophomore for Sherando High School in Stephens City, Virginia, Golden transferred to St. James School in Hagerstown, Maryland. He suffered a stress fracture in his right foot before his junior season, before breaking his left ankle in his second game and missing the rest of the season. As a senior at St. James, Golden averaged 17.2 points, 10.3 rebounds and 3.5 assists per game, leading his team to the Mid-Atlantic Athletic Conference title. He was named Washington County Co-Player of the Year by The Herald-Mail. He committed to playing college basketball for Richmond over offers from James Madison, San Diego, Wofford and George Washington.

== College career ==
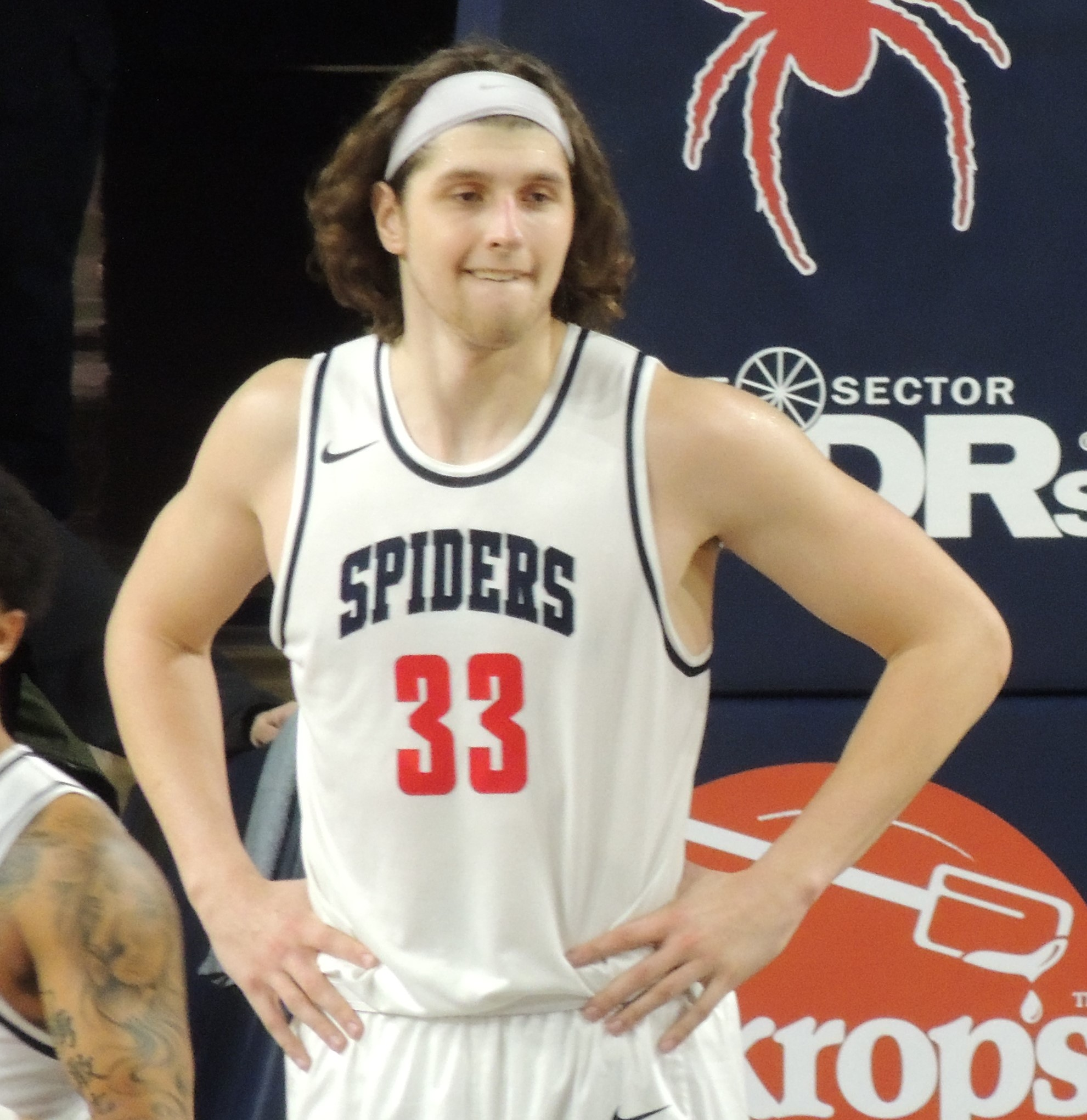
Golden at the University of Richmond in 2018.

On December 17, 2016, during a game against Texas Tech, Golden collapsed and was briefly unconscious due to an irregular heartbeat. He underwent a cardiac ablation procedure to correct his heart rhythm. Golden missed the remainder of the season, after playing nine games, and was granted a medical redshirt by the National Collegiate Athletic Association. As a redshirt freshman, he averaged a team-high 15.6 points and 6.7 rebounds per game, earning Third Team All-Atlantic 10 and Atlantic 10 All-Rookie Team honors. Golden scored 498 points, breaking the program freshman scoring record. On November 21, 2018, he posted a career-high 33 points and nine rebounds in a 68–66 loss to Wyoming. As a sophomore, he averaged 17.2 points, 7.1 rebounds and 3.5 assists per game and was named to the Third Team All-Atlantic 10 for a second time. On January 18, 2020, Golden scored a season-high 25 points in a 97–87 win against George Mason. In his junior season, Golden averaged 13.4 points, 6.9 rebounds and 3.4 assists per game, earning Second Team All-Atlantic 10 honors. He led Richmond to a program-record 14 conference wins. Golden declared for the 2020 NBA draft before withdrawing his name and opting to return to Richmond.

On January 18, 2022, Golden passed the 2,000 career point mark in a win against Fordham. Golden collected his 1,000th rebound in the Spiders' 2022 Atlantic 10 tournament semifinal win over Dayton.

== Professional career ==
=== Grand Rapids Gold (2022–2023) ===
Following his career at Richmond, Golden signed with the Atlanta Hawks for the 2022 NBA Summer League season. Golden then signed an Exhibit 10 contract with the Denver Nuggets for the NBA preseason. Golden was later waived and then re-signed a few days later by the Nuggets. On November 4, 2022, Golden was named to the opening night roster for the Grand Rapids Gold.

=== Vanoli Cremona (2023–2024) ===
On August 1, 2023, Golden signed with Vanoli Cremona of the Lega Basket Serie A.

=== AEK Athens (2024–2025) ===
On July 30, 2024, he joined AEK Athens of the Greek Basket League.

=== Bàsquet Manresa (2025–2026) ===
On June 28, 2025, he signed with Bàsquet Manresa of the Spanish Liga ACB.

=== Élan Chalon (2026–present) ===
On January 17, 2026, he signed with Élan Chalon of the LNB Pro A.

== Career statistics ==
Legend
GP	Games played	GS	Games started	MPG	Minutes per game
FG%	Field goal percentage	3P%	3-point field goal percentage	FT%	Free throw percentage
RPG	Rebounds per game	APG	Assists per game	SPG	Steals per game
BPG	Blocks per game	PPG	Points per game	**Bold**	Career high

=== College ===
Year	Team	GP	GS	MPG	FG%	3P%	FT%	RPG	APG	SPG	BPG	PPG
2016–17	Richmond	9	0	7.6	.350	.200	.333	2.0	.9	.0	.2	2.0
2017–18	Richmond	32	32	30.7	.498	.275	.625	6.7	2.2	**.6**	**1.2**	15.6
2018–19	Richmond	33	33	**31.4**	.503	.296	.657	**7.1**	**3.5**	.5	1.1	**17.2**
2019–20	Richmond	29	29	26.0	.524	.263	**.713**	6.9	3.4	**.6**	.9	13.4
2020–21	Richmond	21	21	27.3	**.562**	**.500**	.667	6.0	**3.5**	**.6**	.5	12.7
2021–22	Richmond	**37**	**37**	27.6	.506	.280	.706	6.0	2.9	.4	.5	13.7
Career		161	152	27.5	.511	.295	.665	6.3	3.0	.5	.8	14.0

== Personal life ==
Golden's younger brother, Bryce, played four years of college basketball for Butler before transferring to Loyola for his final season. His father, Craig, stands 6 ft 10 in (2.08 m) and played college basketball for Fairfield and Hartford.

== See also ==
- List of NCAA Division I men's basketball players with 2,000 points and 1,000 rebounds
