= 2021–22 Richmond Spiders men's basketball team =

2021–22 Richmond Spiders men's basketball

2021–22 Richmond Spiders men's basketball

Atlantic 10 tournament champions

NCAA tournament, Second Round
- Conference: Atlantic 10 Conference
- Record: 24–13 (10–8 A-10)
- Head coach: Chris Mooney (17th season)
- Assistant coaches: Rob Jones; Maurice Joseph; Kevin Hovde
- Home arena: Robins Center

2021–22 Atlantic 10 men's basketball standings
	Conf.				Overall
Team	W		L	PCT	W		L	PCT
Davidson	15	–	3	.833	27	–	7	.794
Dayton	14	–	4	.778	24	–	11	.686
VCU	14	–	4	.778	22	–	10	.688
St. Bonaventure	12	–	5	.706	23	–	10	.697
Saint Louis	12	–	6	.667	23	–	12	.657
Richmond †	10	–	8	.556	24	–	13	.649
George Washington	8	–	9	.471	12	–	18	.400
Fordham	8	–	10	.444	16	–	16	.500
George Mason	7	–	9	.438	14	–	16	.467
UMass	7	–	11	.389	15	–	17	.469
Rhode Island	5	–	12	.294	15	–	16	.484
La Salle	5	–	13	.278	11	–	19	.367
Saint Joseph's	5	–	13	.278	11	–	19	.367
Duquesne	1	–	16	.059	6	–	24	.200
† 2022 A-10 tournament winner

The 2021–22 Richmond Spiders men's basketball team represented the University of Richmond during the 2021–22 NCAA Division I men's basketball season. They were led by 17th-year head coach Chris Mooney and played their home games at the Robins Center as members of the Atlantic 10 Conference. They finished the season 24–13, 10–8 in Atlantic 10 play to finish in sixth place. As the No. 6 seed, they defeated Rhode Island, VCU, Dayton, and Davidson to win the Atlantic 10 tournament. They received the conference’s automatic bid to the NCAA tournament as the No. 12 seed in the Midwest Region, where they upset Iowa in the First Round before losing to Providence in the Second Round.

On December 5, 2021, senior guard Jacob Gilyard set the new all-time NCAA Division I career steals record, securing his 386th steal to surpass Providence's John Linehan (385), whose record had stood since 2002. Gilyard ultimately finished his career with a total of 466 steals.

== Previous season ==
In a season limited due to the ongoing COVID-19 pandemic, the Spiders finished the 2020–21 season 14–9, 6–5 in A-10 play to finish in eighth place. They lost to Duquesne in the second round of the A-10 tournament. The Spiders received an at-large bid to the National Invitation Tournament, where they defeated Toledo in the first round before losing to Mississippi State.

== Offseason ==
=== Departures ===
Name	Number	Pos.	Height	Weight	Year	Hometown	Reason for departure
Blake Francis	1	G	6'0"	175	Graduate Student	Herndon, VA	Graduated

=== Returning players ===
With the NCAA granting student-athletes an extra year of eligibility due to impacts from the COVID-19 pandemic, three scholarship Spiders who would have otherwise exhausted their eligibility elected to return for the 2021–22 season: Jacob Gilyard, Nathan Cayo, and Grant Golden. Nick Sherod also elected to return despite having already spent five years in the Richmond program, including missing the entire 2020–21 season and all but six games of the 2018–19 season due to injuries.

=== 2021 recruiting class ===
College recruiting information
Name	Hometown	School	Height	Weight	Commit date
Jason Nelson; G	Richmond, VA	John Marshall High School	5 ft 10 in (1.78 m)	175 lb (79 kg)	Jun 25, 2020
Jason Nelson; G	Recruit ratings: Scout: Rivals: 247Sports: (NR)				
Malcolm Dread; G	Detroit, MI	Gonzaga College High School	6 ft 4 in (1.93 m)	210 lb (95 kg)	Jun 7, 2020
Malcolm Dread; G	Recruit ratings: Scout: Rivals: 247Sports: (NR)				
Marcus Randolph; G	Willingboro, NJ	Archbishop Wood High School	6 ft 5 in (1.96 m)	195 lb (88 kg)	Sep 25, 2020
Marcus Randolph; G	Recruit ratings: Scout: Rivals: 247Sports: (NR)				
Aidan Noyes; F	Cincinnati, OH	Archbishop Moeller High School	6 ft 7 in (2.01 m)	190 lb (86 kg)	Oct 24, 2020
Aidan Noyes; F	Recruit ratings: Scout: Rivals: 247Sports: (NR)				
Liam Weaver; G	Kansas City, MO	Pembroke Hill School	6 ft 2 in (1.88 m)	190 lb (86 kg)	Dec 19, 2020
Liam Weaver; G	Recruit ratings: Scout: Rivals: 247Sports: (NR)				
Overall recruit ranking:
Note: In many cases, Scout, Rivals, 247Sports, On3, and ESPN may conflict in their listings of height and weight.; In these cases, the average was taken. ESPN grades are on a 100-point scale.; Sources: "Rivals.com 2021 Richmond Commitments". Rivals.; "Scout.com 2021 Richmond Commitments". Scout.; "ESPN 2021 Richmond Commitments". ESPN.; "Scout.com Team Recruiting Rankings". Scout.; "2021 Team Ranking". Rivals.

== Roster ==
2021–22 Richmond Spiders men's basketball team
Players
Coaches

Pos.	#	Name	Height	Weight	Year	Previous school	Hometown
G	0	Jacob Gilyard	5 ft 9 in (1.75 m)	160 lb (73 kg)	GS	The Barstow School	Kansas City, Missouri
G	1	Jason Nelson (redshirt)	5 ft 10 in (1.78 m)	175 lb (79 kg)	Fr	John Marshall High School	Richmond, Virginia
F	2	Souleymane Koureissi	6 ft 9 in (2.06 m)	215 lb (98 kg)	Sr	Iona Prep	Harlem, New York
F	3	Tyler Burton	6 ft 7 in (2.01 m)	215 lb (98 kg)	Jr	Marianapolis Prep	Uxbridge, Massachusetts
F	4	Nathan Cayo	6 ft 7 in (2.01 m)	225 lb (102 kg)	GS	Collège Jean-de-Brébeuf	Montreal, Quebec
G	5	Nick Sherod	6 ft 4 in (1.93 m)	220 lb (100 kg)	GS	St. Christopher's School	Richmond, Virginia
F	10	Sullivan Kulju (W)	6 ft 6 in (1.98 m)	220 lb (100 kg)	GS	Eisenhower Middle/High School	New Berlin, Wisconsin
G	11	Marcus Randolph	6 ft 5 in (1.96 m)	195 lb (88 kg)	Fr	Archbishop Wood Catholic High School	Willingboro, New Jersey
G	12	Malcolm Dread (redshirt)	6 ft 4 in (1.93 m)	210 lb (95 kg)	Fr	Gonzaga College High School	Detroit, Michigan
G	13	Connor Crabtree	6 ft 6 in (1.98 m)	200 lb (91 kg)	RS Jr	Hargrave Military Academy; Tulane	Hillsborough, North Carolina
F	15	Matt Grace	6 ft 9 in (2.06 m)	230 lb (104 kg)	Sr	TRC Academy	Hamilton, Ontario
G	21	Isaiah Wilson	6 ft 0 in (1.83 m)	165 lb (75 kg)	So	First Love Academy	Pittsburgh, Pennsylvania
G	22	Andre Gustavson	6 ft 4 in (1.93 m)	195 lb (88 kg)	Sr	Helsinki Basketball Academy	Helsinki, Finland
G	24	Dji Bailey	6 ft 5 in (1.96 m)	180 lb (82 kg)	So	Greenfield School	Wilson, North Carolina
G	25	Quentin Southall (W)	6 ft 3 in (1.91 m)	180 lb (82 kg)	So	Georgetown Prep	Alexandria, Virginia
G	31	Jordan Gaitley (W)	6 ft 4 in (1.93 m)	190 lb (86 kg)	GS	Fordham Preparatory School	Haverford, Pennsylvania
G	32	Liam Weaver (W)	6 ft 2 in (1.88 m)	190 lb (86 kg)	Fr	Pembroke Hill School	Kansas City, Missouri
F	33	Grant Golden	6 ft 10 in (2.08 m)	255 lb (116 kg)	GS	St. James School	Winchester, Virginia
G	34	Gabe Arizin (W)	6 ft 4 in (1.93 m)	190 lb (86 kg)	Jr	St. Joseph's Prep	West Chester, Pennsylvania
F	35	Aidan Noyes (redshirt)	6 ft 7 in (2.01 m)	190 lb (86 kg)	Fr	Moeller High School	Cincinnati, Ohio

Head coach

- Chris Mooney (Princeton)

Assistant coach(es)

- Rob Jones (Toccoa Falls)
- Maurice Joseph (Vermont)
- Kevin Hovde (Richmond)

Legend

- (C) Team captain
- (S) Suspended
- (I) Ineligible
- (W) Walk-on
- Injured
- Current redshirt

Roster
Last update: September 20, 2021

== Schedule and results ==
Richmond announced its 13-game non-conference schedule on August 9, 2021, consisting of six home games, three road games, and four neutral-site games. The non-conference schedule began on November 9 with a home game against North Carolina Central and concluded with a December 22 home game against Bucknell. The Atlantic 10 portion of Richmond's schedule was announced on September 9, 2021.

Date time, TV	Rank^{#}	Opponent^{#}	Result	Record	High points	High rebounds	High assists	Site (attendance) city, state
Non-conference regular season
November 9, 2021*; 7:00 p.m., NBCSWA/ESPN+		North Carolina Central	W 70–60	1–0	19 – Golden	6 – Tied	6 – Gilyard	Robins Center (6,173); Richmond, VA
November 12, 2021*; 6:00 p.m., CBSSN		vs. Utah State; Veterans Classic	L 74–85	1–1	24 – Golden	8 – Golden	6 – Gilyard	Alumni Hall (3,800); Annapolis, MD
November 16, 2021*; 7:00 p.m., NBCSWA/ESPN+		Georgia State	W 94–78	2–1	20 – Burton	8 – Tied	6 – Tied	Robins Center (5,521); Richmond, VA
November 20, 2021*; 1:00 p.m., ESPN+		at Drake	L 70–73	2–2	30 – Burton	9 – Burton	5 – Tied	Knapp Center (3,347); Des Moines, IA
November 22, 2021*; 7:00 p.m., NBCSWA+/ESPN+		Hofstra	W 81–68	3–2	22 – Burton	7 – Tied	6 – Gilyard	Robins Center (5,201); Richmond, VA
November 25, 2021*; 7:00 p.m., CBSSN		vs. Maryland; Bahamas Championship semifinal	L 80–86	3–3	18 – Golden	8 – Cayo	5 – Golden	Baha Mar Convention Center; Nassau, Bahamas
November 27, 2021*; 12:30 p.m., FloHoops		vs. Mississippi State; Bahamas Championship consolation	L 71–82 ^{OT}	3–4	23 – Burton	7 – Burton	6 – Gilyard	Baha Mar Convention Center; Nassau, Bahamas
December 1, 2021*; 7:00 p.m., ESPN+		at Wofford	W 73–64	4–4	21 – Golden	7 – Gilyard	4 – Tied	Jerry Richardson Indoor Stadium (1,576); Spartanburg, SC
December 5, 2021*; 2:00 p.m., ESPN+		at Northern Iowa	W 60–52	5–4	26 – Burton	8 – Sherod	4 – Tied	McLeod Center (2,337); Cedar Falls, IA
December 11, 2021*; 6:00 p.m., MASN/ESPN+		Toledo	W 72–69	6–4	17 – Burton	9 – Burton	7 – Gilyard	Robins Center (6,592); Richmond, VA
December 17, 2021*; 6:30 p.m., ACCN		vs. NC State; Basketball Hall of Fame Shootout	W 83–74	7–4	19 – Golden	8 – Burton	10 – Gilyard	Spectrum Center; Charlotte, NC
December 19, 2021*; 4:00 p.m., MASN/ESPN+		Old Dominion	W 67–61	8–4	29 – Burton	10 – Burton	8 – Gilyard	Robins Center (6,884); Richmond, VA
December 22, 2021*; 4:00 p.m., NBCSWA+/ESPN+		Bucknell	W 81–50	9–4	22 – Golden	10 – Golden	11 – Gilyard	Robins Center (5,037); Richmond, VA
A-10 regular season
December 30, 2021; 7:00 p.m., NBCSWA+/ESPN+		Saint Joseph's	L 56–83	9–5 (0–1)	14 – Golden	7 – Golden	6 – Gilyard	Robins Center (5,003); Richmond, VA
January 2, 2022; 2:00 p.m., CBSSN		at Saint Louis	L 69–76	9–6 (0–2)	24 – Burton	12 – Burton	4 – Tied	Chaifetz Arena (4,825); St. Louis, MO
January 5, 2022; 7:00 p.m., NBCSWA+/ESPN+		Massachusetts	W 80–72	10–6 (1–2)	17 – Gilyard	13 – Burton	10 – Gilyard	Robins Center (5,004); Richmond, VA
January 14, 2022; 9:00 p.m., ESPNU		Davidson	L 84–87	10–7 (1–3)	28 – Gilyard	5 – Golden	5 – Gilyard	Robins Center (6,471); Richmond, VA
January 18, 2022; 8:00 p.m., MASN/ESPN+		at Fordham; Rescheduled from January 8	W 83–70	11–7 (2–3)	31 – Gilyard	7 – Gustavson	3 – Tied	Rose Hill Gym (0); Bronx, NY
January 22, 2022; 4:30 p.m., USA		at La Salle	W 64–56	12–7 (3–3)	18 – Tied	5 – Tied	7 – Gilyard	Tom Gola Arena (2,137); Philadelphia, PA
January 25, 2022; 6:30 p.m., CBSSN		at Rhode Island	W 70–63	13–7 (4–3)	15 – Tied	13 – Burton	6 – Gilyard	Ryan Center (6,259); Kingston, RI
January 29, 2022; 4:00 p.m., CBSSN		VCU; Capital City Classic	L 62–64	13–8 (4–4)	18 – Golden	9 – Golden	6 – Gilyard	Robins Center (7,201); Richmond, VA
February 1, 2022; 7:00 p.m., ESPN+		at Duquesne	W 74–57	14–8 (5–4)	18 – Burton	12 – Burton	4 – Golden	UPMC Cooper Fieldhouse (2,211); Pittsburgh, PA
February 4, 2022; 6:00 p.m., ESPN2		St. Bonaventure	W 71–61	15–8 (6–4)	36 – Burton	10 – Golden	8 – Gilyard	Robins Center (5,803); Richmond, VA
February 7, 2022; 7:00 p.m., MASN/ESPN+		George Mason; Rescheduled from January 11	W 62–59	16–8 (7–4)	23 – Gilyard	5 – Tied	3 – Tied	Robins Center (5,354); Richmond, VA
February 9, 2022; 7:00 p.m., CBSSN		at George Mason	L 84–87 ^{OT}	16–9 (7–5)	23 – Golden	8 – Tied	11 – Gilyard	EagleBank Arena (3,842); Fairfax, VA
February 12, 2022; 6:00 p.m., NBCSWA+/ESPN+		La Salle	W 77–63	17–9 (8–5)	15 – Tied	10 – Burton	6 – Gustavson	Robins Center (6,801); Richmond, VA
February 18, 2022; 7:00 p.m., ESPN2		at VCU; Capital City Classic	L 57–77	17–10 (8–6)	13 – Burton	11 – Burton	4 – Gilyard	Siegel Center (7,637); Richmond, VA
February 22, 2022; 7:00 p.m., ESPN+		at George Washington	W 84–71	18–10 (9–6)	19 – Cayo	8 – Cayo	6 – Golden	Charles E. Smith Center (1,254); Washington, D.C.
February 25, 2022; 7:00 p.m., ESPN2		Saint Louis	W 68–66	19–10 (10–6)	23 – Burton	10 – Burton	2 – Tied	Robins Center (6,750); Richmond, VA
March 1, 2022; 6:30 p.m., CBSSN		Dayton	L 53–55	19–11 (10–7)	15 – Golden	10 – Golden	3 – Gilyard	Robins Center (6,572); Richmond, VA
March 4, 2022; 7:00 p.m., ESPN2		at St. Bonaventure	L 65–72	19–12 (10–8)	21 – Burton	8 – Burton	4 – Cayo	Reilly Center (4,860); St. Bonaventure, NY
A-10 tournament
March 10, 2022; 8:30 p.m., USA/Peacock	(6)	vs. (11) Rhode Island; Second Round	W 64–59	20–12	19 – Golden	11 – Burton	4 – Gilyard	Capital One Arena (6,543); Washington, D.C.
March 11, 2022; 8:30 p.m., USA/Peacock	(6)	vs. (3) VCU; Quarterfinals	W 75–64	21–12	32 – Gilyard	8 – Burton	3 – Gilyard	Capital One Arena (7,420); Washington, D.C.
March 12, 2022; 3:30 p.m., CBSSN	(6)	vs. (2) Dayton; Semifinals	W 68–64	22–12	18 – Golden	9 – Golden	5 – Gilyard	Capital One Arena (7,799); Washington, D.C.
March 13, 2022; 1:00 p.m., CBS	(6)	vs. (1) Davidson; Championship	W 64–62	23–12	26 – Gilyard	12 – Burton	3 – Cayo	Capital One Arena (8,452); Washington, D.C.
NCAA tournament
March 17, 2022; 3:10 p.m., truTV	(12 MW)	vs. (5 MW) No. 16 Iowa; First Round	W 67–63	24–12	24 – Gilyard	11 – Burton	6 – Gilyard	KeyBank Center (16,017); Buffalo, NY
March 19, 2022; 6:10 p.m., TNT	(12 MW)	vs. (4 MW) No. 13 Providence; Second Round	L 51–79	24–13	18 – Cayo	6 – Burton	5 – Golden	KeyBank Center; Buffalo, NY
*Non-conference game. ^{#}Rankings from AP Poll. (#) Tournament seedings in parentheses. All times are in Eastern Time.
