= 2022 Atlantic 10 men's basketball tournament =

American college basketball postseason tournament

- Classification: Division I
- Season: 2021–22
- Teams: 14
- Site: Capital One Arena; Washington, D.C.
- Champions: Richmond (2nd title)
- Winning coach: Chris Mooney (2nd title)
- MVP: Jacob Gilyard (Richmond)
- Attendance: 42,700
- Television: ESPN+, USA Network/Peacock, CBSSN, CBS/Paramount+

2021–22 Atlantic 10 men's basketball standings
	Conf.				Overall
Team	W		L	PCT	W		L	PCT
Davidson	15	–	3	.833	27	–	7	.794
Dayton	14	–	4	.778	24	–	11	.686
VCU	14	–	4	.778	22	–	10	.688
St. Bonaventure	12	–	5	.706	23	–	10	.697
Saint Louis	12	–	6	.667	23	–	12	.657
Richmond †	10	–	8	.556	24	–	13	.649
George Washington	8	–	9	.471	12	–	18	.400
Fordham	8	–	10	.444	16	–	16	.500
George Mason	7	–	9	.438	14	–	16	.467
UMass	7	–	11	.389	15	–	17	.469
Rhode Island	5	–	12	.294	15	–	16	.484
La Salle	5	–	13	.278	11	–	19	.367
Saint Joseph's	5	–	13	.278	11	–	19	.367
Duquesne	1	–	16	.059	6	–	24	.200
† 2022 A-10 tournament winner

The 2022 Atlantic 10 men's basketball tournament was the postseason men's basketball tournament for the 2021–22 season of the Atlantic 10 Conference (A-10). It was held March 9–13, 2022, in Washington, D.C., at the Capital One Arena. The winner of the tournament, the Richmond Spiders, received the conference's automatic bid to the 2022 NCAA tournament.

== Seeds ==
All 14 A-10 schools participated in the tournament. Teams were seeded by winning percentage within the conference, with a tiebreaker system to seed teams with identical percentages. The top 10 teams received a first-round bye and the top four teams received a double-bye, automatically advancing them to the quarterfinals.

Seed	School	Conference Record	Tiebreaker
1	Davidson	15–3	
2	Dayton	14–4	1–1 vs. VCU, 1–0 vs. Davidson
3	VCU	14–4	1–1 vs. Dayton, 1–1 vs. Davidson
4	St. Bonaventure	12–5	
5	Saint Louis	12–6	
6	Richmond	10–8	
7	George Washington	8–9	
8	Fordham	8–10	
9	George Mason	7–9	
10	Massachusetts	7–11	
11	Rhode Island	5–12	
12	La Salle	5–13	2–0 vs. Saint Joseph's
13	Saint Joseph's	5–13	0–2 vs. La Salle
14	Duquesne	1–16	

== Schedule ==
Session	Game	Time	Matchup	Score	Television	Attendance
First round – Wednesday, March 9
1	1	1:00 pm	No. 12 La Salle vs No. 13 Saint Joseph's	63–56	ESPN+	2,283
1	2	3:30 pm	No. 11 Rhode Island vs No. 14 Duquesne	79–77	ESPN+	2,283
Second round – Thursday, March 10
2	3	12:00 pm	No. 8 Fordham vs No. 9 George Mason	54–49	USA Network/Peacock	4,309
2	4	2:30 pm	No. 5 Saint Louis vs No. 12 La Salle	71–51	USA Network/Peacock	4,309
3	5	6:00 pm	No. 7 George Washington vs No. 10 UMass	88–99	USA Network/Peacock	6,543
3	6	8:30 pm	No. 6 Richmond vs No. 11 Rhode Island	64–59	USA Network/Peacock	6,543
Quarterfinals – Friday, March 11
4	7	12:00 pm	No. 1 Davidson vs No. 8 Fordham	74–56	USA Network/Peacock	5,894
4	8	2:30 pm	No. 4 St. Bonaventure vs No. 5 Saint Louis	56–57	USA Network/Peacock	5,894
5	9	6:00 pm	No. 2 Dayton vs No. 10 UMass	75–72	USA Network/Peacock	7,420
5	10	8:30 pm	No. 3 VCU vs No. 6 Richmond	64–75	USA Network/Peacock	7,420
Semifinals – Saturday, March 12
6	11	1:00 pm	No. 1 Davidson vs No. 5 Saint Louis	84–69	CBSSN	7,799
6	12	3:30 pm	No. 2 Dayton vs No. 6 Richmond	64–68	CBSSN	7,799
Championship – Sunday, March 13
7	13	1:00 pm	No. 1 Davidson vs No. 6 Richmond	62-64	CBS/Paramount+	8,452

*Game times in Eastern Time.

== Bracket ==
First round Wednesday, March 9 ESPN+
12	La Salle	63
13	Saint Joseph's	56
11	Rhode Island	79
14	Duquesne	77

Second round Thursday, March 10; USA Network/Peacock
8	Fordham	54
9	George Mason	49
5	Saint Louis	71
12	La Salle	51
7	George Washington	88
10	UMass	99
6	Richmond	64
11	Rhode Island	59

Quarterfinals; Friday, March 11; USA Network/Peacock
1	Davidson	74
8	Fordham	56
4	St. Bonaventure	56
5	Saint Louis	57
2	Dayton	75
10	UMass	72
3	VCU	64
6	Richmond	75

Semifinals; Saturday, March 12; CBSSN
1	Davidson	84
5	Saint Louis	69
2	Dayton	64
6	Richmond	68

Championship; Sunday, March 13; CBS/Paramount+
1	Davidson	62
6	Richmond	64
