= Jacob Gilyard =

American basketball player (born 1998)

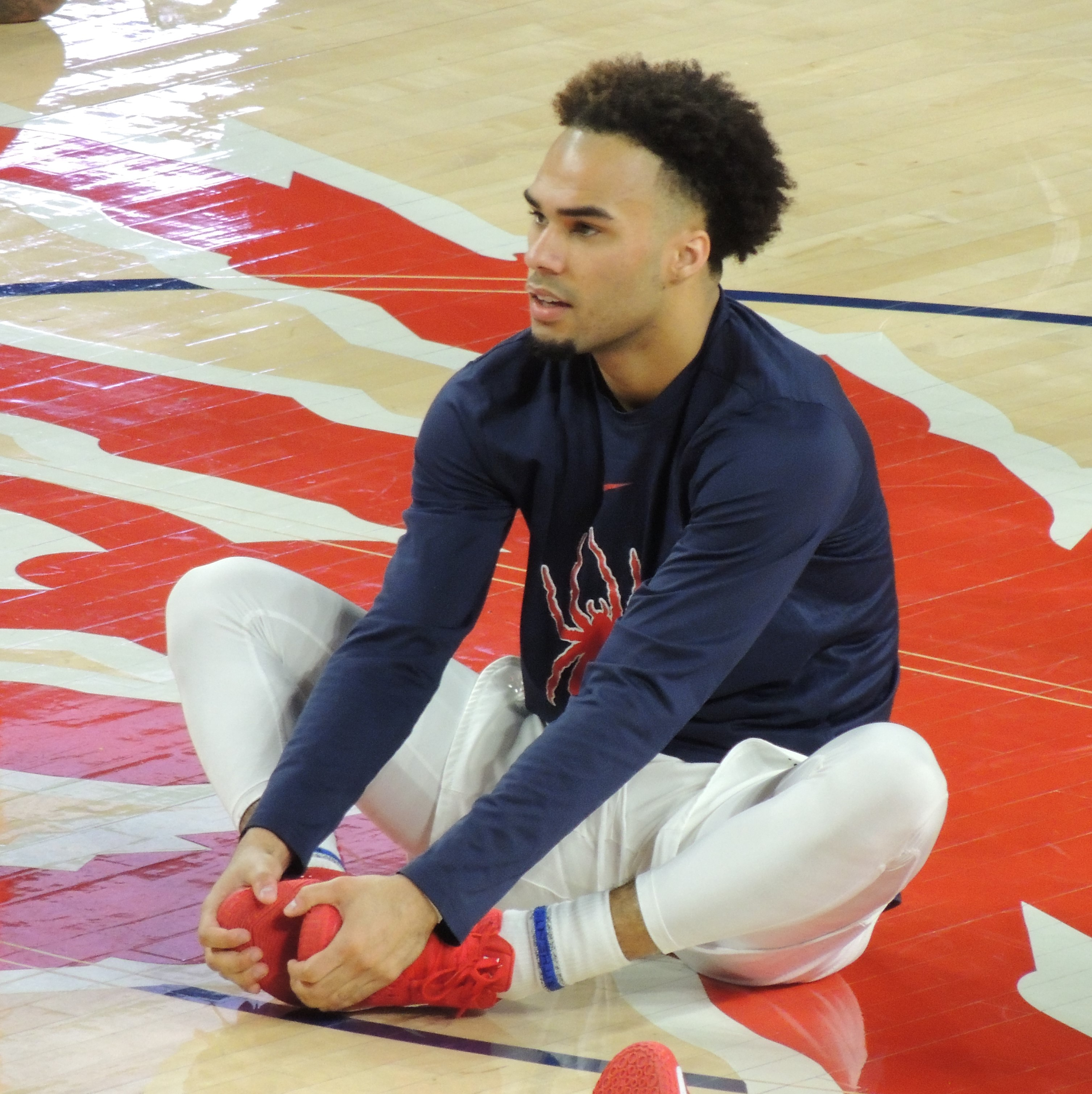
- Gilyard with the Richmond Spiders in 2020

No. 7 – BCM Gravelines-Dunkerque
- Position: Point guard
- League: LNB Élite

Personal information
- Born: July 14, 1998 (age 28) Kansas City, Missouri, U.S.
- Listed height: 5 ft 8 in (1.73 m)
- Listed weight: 160 lb (73 kg)

Career information
- High school: The Barstow School (Kansas City, Missouri)
- College: Richmond (2017–2022)
- NBA draft: 2022: undrafted
- Playing career: 2022–present

Career history
- 2022–2023: Memphis Hustle
- 2023–2024: Memphis Grizzlies
- 2023–2024: →Memphis Hustle
- 2024: Brooklyn Nets
- 2024: →Long Island Nets
- 2024–2025: Cleveland Charge
- 2025: Niners Chemnitz
- 2025–2026: Pallacanestro Cantù
- 2026–present: BCM Gravelines-Dunkerque

Career highlights
- NBA G League assists leader (2023); NCAA Division I all-time steals leader; 2× NCAA steals leader (2020, 2021); Senior CLASS Award (2022); Atlantic 10 Defensive Player of the Year (2020); First-team All-Atlantic 10 (2020); 2× Second-team All-Atlantic 10 (2019, 2021); Third-team All-Atlantic 10 (2022); 4× Atlantic 10 All-Defensive Team (2019–2022); Atlantic 10 tournament MVP (2022)
- Stats at NBA.com
- Stats at Basketball Reference

Jacob Gilyard (/ˈɡɪljərd/ GHIL-yərd; born July 14, 1998) is an American professional basketball player for BCM Gravelines-Dunkerque in the LNB Élite. He played college basketball for the Richmond Spiders. Gilyard is the all-time NCAA career steals leader, breaking the previous record of 385 on December 5, 2021, and finishing his career with 466 steals.

== High school career ==
Gilyard played basketball for The Barstow School in Kansas City, Missouri under the coaching of former National Basketball Association (NBA) player Billy Thomas. As a sophomore, he helped win the Missouri Class 3 state championship, his program's first state title since 1995, after scoring 16 points in a 61–46 win over Strafford High School. On December 5, 2016, during his senior season, Gilyard scored a school-record 50 points in an 85–47 victory over Washington High School. He finished the season averaging 33.2 points and seven assists per game, was named Class 3 Player of the Year and won the DiRenna Award as the top player in the Kansas City area. A three-star recruit, Gilyard committed to play collegiately for Richmond on September 12, 2016. He did not receive any offers from Power Five programs.

== College career ==
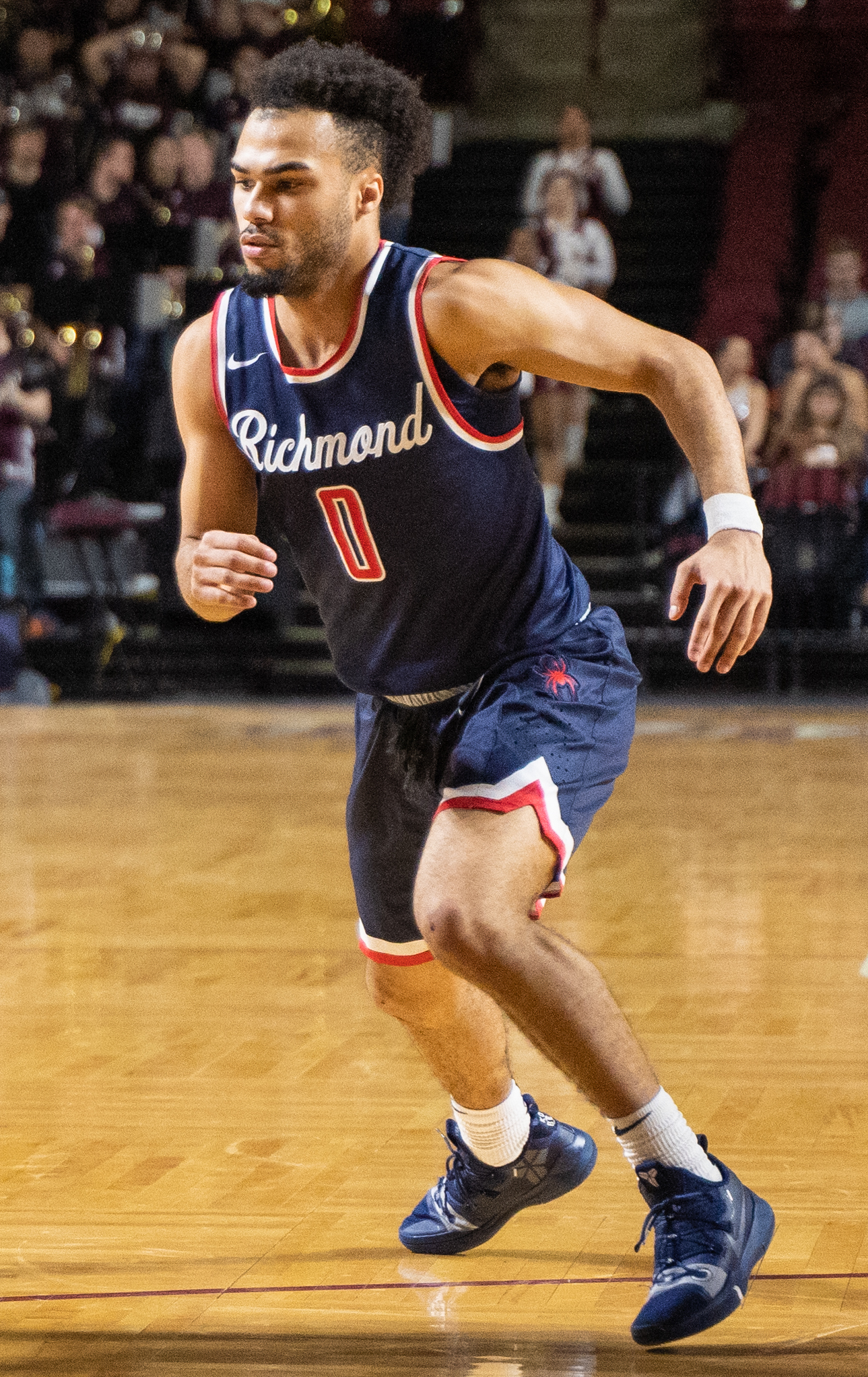
Gilyard in March 2019

On December 10, 2017, Gilyard scored a freshman season-high 23 points with five three-pointers in a 74–71 win over James Madison. He made the game-winning three-pointer with 0.4 seconds left. On February 28, 2018, Gilyard recorded 13 points, six assists and three steals in a 90–65 win over UMass, surpassing Kenny Atkinson's school freshman assist record and becoming the first NCAA Division I freshman to reach 80 steals since Oklahoma State's Marcus Smart in 2013. He closed the season with 89 steals, breaking the program record previously held by Tony Dobbins. As a freshman, Gilyard averaged 11.4 points, 4.1 assists and 2.8 steals per game, which ranked sixth in the country, and started in all 32 games.

In the third game of his sophomore season, on November 16, 2018, Gilyard scored a season-high 31 points, 27 of which came in the second half, and recorded six assists in a 78–70 victory over IUPUI. On February 11, 2019, he was named Atlantic 10 Conference Player of the Week for his first time after averaging 22.5 points, 5.5 assists and five steals per game in wins over George Mason and George Washington. Gilyard averaged 16.2 points, 5.2 assists and 2.8 steals per game as a sophomore, earning second-team All-Atlantic 10 and Atlantic 10 All-Defensive Team honors. He joined Allen Iverson and Jason Kidd as the only Division I players since 1992 to record at least 868 points, 290 assists and 177 steals by the end of their sophomore seasons.

On November 18, 2019, Gilyard was recognized as Atlantic 10 Co-Player of the Week after averaging 22.0 points, 5.5 assists and four steals per game in victories over Vanderbilt and Cal State Northridge. On December 9, he was again named conference Co-Player of the Week after averaging 16.5 points, 8.5 assists, six rebounds and five steals in wins over Hampton and South Alabama. Against Hampton, Gilyard registered his first double-double, with 18 points and a season-high 10 assists, and scored his 1,000th career point. On January 25, 2020, he scored a season-high 29 points in an 87–79 loss to seventh-ranked Dayton. As a junior, Gilyard was named Atlantic 10 Defensive Player of the Year and first-team All-Atlantic 10 after averaging 12.7 points, 5.7 assists, a Division I-high 3.2 steals and 3.1 rebounds per game. Following the season Gilyard declared for the 2020 NBA draft. On May 21, Gilyard announced he was withdrawing from the draft and returning for his senior season at Richmond.

Gilyard took advantage of the NCAA offer of an extra year of eligibility due to the impacts of the COVID-19 pandemic on college athletics, choosing to return for a fifth year. He was named to the Third Team All-Atlantic 10 as well as the All-Defensive Team.

== Professional career ==
=== Memphis Grizzlies / Hustle (2022–2024) ===
After going undrafted in the 2022 NBA draft, Gilyard signed with the Memphis Grizzlies on September 23, 2022, but was waived on October 10. On October 23, he joined the Memphis Hustle.

On April 8, 2023, Gilyard signed a two-way contract with the Grizzlies becoming one of only two active NBA players below 6" tall. The next day, he made his NBA debut in a 115–100 loss to the Oklahoma City Thunder where he recorded three points, seven assists, four rebounds, and three steals. After 20 games, he led the Grizzlies in three-point shooting percentage at 42.9%. On February 24, 2024, he was waived by Memphis.

=== Brooklyn / Long Island Nets (2024) ===
On March 2, 2024, Gilyard signed a two-way contract with the Brooklyn Nets.

=== Cleveland Charge (2024–2025) ===
On September 24, 2024, Gilyard signed with the Cleveland Cavaliers, but was waived on October 19. On October 26, he joined the Cleveland Charge.

=== Niners Chemnitz (2025) ===
In March 2025, Gilyard signed with the Niners Chemnitz.

=== Pallacanestro Cantù (2025) ===
On July 13, 2025, Gilyard signed with Pallacanestro Cantù of the Italian Lega Basket Serie A (LBA).

=== BCM Gravelines-Dunkerque (2026–present) ===
On January 14, 2026, Gilyard signed with BCM Gravelines-Dunkerque in the LNB Élite.

== Career statistics ==
Legend
GP	Games played	GS	Games started	MPG	Minutes per game
FG%	Field goal percentage	3P%	3-point field goal percentage	FT%	Free throw percentage
RPG	Rebounds per game	APG	Assists per game	SPG	Steals per game
BPG	Blocks per game	PPG	Points per game	**Bold**	Career high

=== NBA ===
Year	Team	GP	GS	MPG	FG%	3P%	FT%	RPG	APG	SPG	BPG	PPG
2022–23	Memphis	1	0	**41.0**	.333	.333	—	**4.0**	**7.0**	**3.0**	.0	3.0
2023–24	Memphis	**37**	**14**	17.7	**.417**	**.425**	1.000	1.2	3.5	.7	**.1**	**4.7**
2023–24	Brooklyn	4	0	11.2	.000	.000	—	.8	1.5	1.5	.0	.0
Career		42	14	17.6	.399	.403	1.000	1.2	3.4	.9	.1	4.2

=== College ===
Year	Team	GP	GS	MPG	FG%	3P%	FT%	RPG	APG	SPG	BPG	PPG
2017–18	Richmond	32	32	36.4	.452	**.384**	.836	2.2	4.1	2.8	.0	11.4
2018–19	Richmond	31	31	37.3	**.472**	.363	.771	2.9	5.2	2.8	.0	**16.2**
2019–20	Richmond	31	31	36.6	.468	.367	.802	3.1	**5.7**	3.2	**.2**	12.7
2020–21	Richmond	23	23	37.7	.410	.336	.842	3.0	5.0	**3.6**	.0	12.3
2021–22	Richmond	**37**	**37**	**38.5**	.395	.360	**.860**	**3.5**	5.4	2.9	**.2**	13.3
Career		154	154	37.3	.439	.362	.820	2.9	5.1	3.0	.1	13.2

== Personal life ==
Gilyard's father, Rodney, played basketball for Ottawa University at the National Association of Intercollegiate Athletics (NAIA) level and left as the program's all-time leader in assists and steals. Rodney is a member of the school's Athletics Hall of Fame.

== See also ==
- List of shortest players in NBA history
- List of NCAA Division I men's basketball season steals leaders
- List of NCAA Division I men's basketball career steals leaders
