= Community School of Naples =

Prep school in Naples, Florida, US

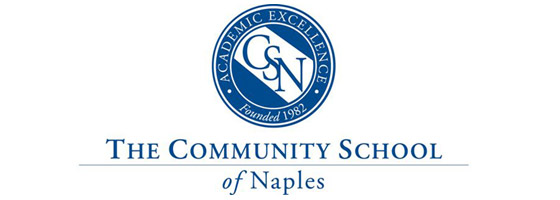

Location
- 13275 Livingston Rd. Naples, Florida 34109; United States

Information
- Type: Independent, College Preparatory Day School
- Mottoes: Opportunity of a Lifetime, Dedicated to Academic Excellence, Every Student, Every Day
- Established: 1982; 44 years ago
- Head of school: Paul Selvidio
- Grades: Early Learning through 12
- Enrollment: 1,075
- Colors: Blue, Black, White
- Mascot: Seahawk
- Publication: The Chronicle
- Website: www.communityschoolnaples.org

Community School of Naples (CSN) is an independent, college preparatory day school in Naples, Florida. The school enrolls more than 1,075 students on a 77 acre campus with 26 buildings.

== History ==
CSN was founded in 1982 by a group of parents and the original student body was recruited by word of mouth. The first class consisted of fewer than 50 students who began K-5 classes in rented accommodation in two churches in Naples. Sam Hazard served as the first Head of School. The high school was discontinued in 1986 for financial reasons, but was reinstated in 1992.

The current head of the school, Mr. Paul Selvidio, was named the sixth Head of CSN on July 1, 2025.

== Accreditations ==
CSN is accredited by the Florida Council of Independent Schools (FCIS), is a member of the National Association of Independent Schools (NAIS), is a member of School Year Abroad (SYA), a member of Global Education Benchmark Group (GEBG), the Global Access Members of European Council of International Schools (ECIS), is Accredited by AdvanceED and holds ratings as a top private school in Florida with NICHE.

== Sports ==
=== Fall sports ===
- cheerleading
- cross country
- football
- golf (boys and girls)
- swimming and diving
- girls volleyball
- sailing

=== Winter sports ===
- boys and girls basketball
- cheerleading
- sailing
- boys and girls soccer

=== Spring sports ===
- baseball
- boys and girls lacrosse
- softball
- boys and girls tennis
- track and field
- girls beach volleyball
- sailing
