= 2021–22 Virginia Cavaliers men's basketball team =

American college basketball season

2021–22 Virginia Cavaliers men's basketball

Legends Classic champions

NIT, Quarterfinals
- Conference: Atlantic Coast Conference
- Record: 21–14 (12–8 ACC)
- Head coach: Tony Bennett (13th season)
- Associate head coach: Jason Williford (13th season)
- Assistant coaches: Orlando Vandross (4th season); Kyle Getter (1st season)
- Offensive scheme: Blocker-Mover
- Base defense: Pack-Line
- Home arena: John Paul Jones Arena

2021–22 ACC men's basketball standings
	Conf.				Overall
Team	W		L	PCT	W		L	PCT
No. 9 Duke	16	–	4	.800	32	–	7	.821
North Carolina	15	–	5	.750	29	–	10	.744
Notre Dame	15	–	5	.750	24	–	11	.686
Miami (FL)	14	–	6	.700	26	–	11	.703
Wake Forest	13	–	7	.650	25	–	10	.714
Virginia	12	–	8	.600	21	–	14	.600
Virginia Tech †	11	–	9	.550	23	–	13	.639
Florida State	10	–	10	.500	17	–	14	.548
Syracuse	9	–	11	.450	16	–	17	.485
Clemson	8	–	12	.400	17	–	16	.515
Louisville	6	–	14	.300	13	–	19	.406
Boston College	6	–	14	.300	13	–	20	.394
Pittsburgh	6	–	14	.300	11	–	21	.344
Georgia Tech	5	–	15	.250	12	–	20	.375
NC State	4	–	16	.200	11	–	21	.344
† 2022 ACC tournament winner Rankings from AP poll

The 2021–22 Virginia Cavaliers men's basketball team represented the University of Virginia during the 2021–22 NCAA Division I men's basketball season. The team was led by head coach Tony Bennett in his 13th year and played their home games at John Paul Jones Arena in Charlottesville, Virginia, as members of the Atlantic Coast Conference.

The Cavaliers finished the season 21–14, 12–8 in ACC Play to finish in 6th place. They defeated Louisville in the second round of the ACC tournament before losing in the quarterfinals to North Carolina. They received an at-large bid to the National Invitation Tournament, where they defeated Mississippi State and North Texas to advance to the quarterfinals, where they lost to St. Bonaventure.

The Cavaliers did not qualify for the NCAA Tournament for the first time since 2012–13.

== Previous season ==
In a season limited due to the ongoing COVID-19 pandemic, the Cavaliers finished the 2020–21 season 18–7, 13–4 in ACC play to win the regular season championship. They defeated Syracuse in the quarterfinals of the ACC tournament before they were forced to withdraw from the tournament due to COVID-19 issues. They received a bid to the NCAA tournament as the No. 4 seed in the West region, where they were upset in the first round by Ohio.

== Offseason ==
=== Coaching changes ===
Virginia coaching changes
Name	Previous position	New position
Brad Soderberg	Assistant coach	Director of scouting
Kyle Getter	Director of recruiting/player development	Assistant coach
Larry Mangino	Director of scouting/recruiting	Director of player development
Isaiah Wilkins	Forward (ratiopharm Ulm)	Graduate assistant

=== Departures ===
Virginia departures
Name	Number	Pos.	Height	Weight	Year	Hometown	Reason for departure
Jabri Abdur-Rahim	1	F/G	6'7"	214	Freshman	South Orange, NJ	Transferred to Georgia
Justin McKoy	4	F	6'8"	215	Sophomore	Cary, NC	Transferred to North Carolina
Sam Hauser	10	F	6'8"	218	(redshirt) Senior	Stevens Point, WI	Graduated
Casey Morsell	13	G	6'3"	196	Sophomore	Fort Washington, MD	Transferred to NC State
Austin Katstra	24	F	6'6"	245	Senior	Charlottesville, VA	Graduated
Trey Murphy III	25	F/G	6'9"	206	Junior	Durham, NC	Declared for 2021 NBA draft
Jay Huff	30	F/C	7'1"	240	(redshirt) Senior	Durham, NC	Graduated
Tomas Woldetensae	53	G	6'5"	197	Senior	Bologna, Italy	Graduated (Note: Due to COVID-19, the NCAA declared that the 2020–21 season would not count against the eligibility of any basketball player. Hauser, Katstra, Huff, and Woldetensae all could have returned for 2021–22, but chose not to do so.)

=== Incoming transfers ===
Virginia incoming transfers
Name	Number	Pos.	Height	Weight	Year	Hometown	Previous school	Years remaining	Date eligible
Jayden Gardner	1	F	6'6"	246	Senior	Wake Forest, NC	East Carolina	2	October 1, 2021
Armaan Franklin	4	G	6'4"	204	Junior	Indianapolis, IN	Indiana	3	October 1, 2021

=== 2021 recruiting class ===
College recruiting
Name	Hometown	School	Height	Weight	Commit date
Taine Murray; SG	Auckland, New Zealand	Rosmini College	6 ft 5 in (1.96 m)	190 lb (86 kg)	Sep 13, 2020
Taine Murray; SG	Recruit ratings: Rivals: 247Sports: (NR)				
Igor Miličić Jr. SF	Rovinj, Croatia	Ratiopharm Ulm	6 ft 9 in (2.06 m)	185 lb (84 kg)	May 1, 2021
Igor Miličić Jr. SF	Recruit ratings: (NR)				
Overall recruit ranking: Rivals: 77 247Sports: 82 ESPN: –
Note: In many cases, Scout, Rivals, 247Sports, On3, and ESPN may conflict in their listings of height and weight.; In these cases, the average was taken. ESPN grades are on a 100-point scale.; Sources: "Virginia 2021 Basketball Commitments". Rivals.; "2021 Virginia Commits". Scout.; "2021 Player Commits". ESPN.; "Scout.com Team Recruiting Rankings". Scout.; "2021 Team Ranking". Rivals.; "Virginia 2021 Basketball Commitments". 247Sports.

^ESPN has not released their team rankings for 2021 yet.

== Roster ==
=== Players ===
2021–22 Virginia Cavaliers men's basketball team
Players
Coaches

Pos.	#	Name	Height	Weight	Year	Previous school	Hometown
G	0	Kihei Clark	5 ft 10 in (1.78 m)	172 lb (78 kg)	Sr	Taft Charter	Woodland Hills, CA
F	1	Jayden Gardner	6 ft 6 in (1.98 m)	246 lb (112 kg)	Sr	Heritage; East Carolina	Wake Forest, NC
G	2	Reece Beekman	6 ft 3 in (1.91 m)	181 lb (82 kg)	So	Scotlandville Magnet	Baton Rouge, LA
G	4	Armaan Franklin	6 ft 4 in (1.93 m)	204 lb (93 kg)	Jr	Cathedral; Indiana	Indianapolis, IN
G	5	Jayden Nixon (W)	6 ft 3 in (1.91 m)	200 lb (91 kg)	Sr	Choate Rosemary Hall	Charlottesville, VA
G	10	Taine Murray	6 ft 5 in (1.96 m)	207 lb (94 kg)	Fr	Rosmini College	Auckland, New Zealand
G	11	Malachi Poindexter (W)	6 ft 2 in (1.88 m)	190 lb (86 kg)	So	St. Anne's-Belfield School	Mineral, VA
G	12	Chase Coleman (W)	5 ft 9 in (1.75 m)	161 lb (73 kg)	Jr	Maury	Norfolk, VA
F	21	Kadin Shedrick	6 ft 11 in (2.11 m)	231 lb (105 kg)	RS So	Holly Springs	Holly Springs, NC
C	22	Francisco Cáffaro	7 ft 1 in (2.16 m)	242 lb (110 kg)	RS Jr	NBA Global Academy	Santa Fe, Argentina
G	23	Kody Stattmann	6 ft 8 in (2.03 m)	200 lb (91 kg)	Sr	St. Augustine's College	Bentley Park, Queensland, Australia
G/F	24	Igor Miličić Jr.	6 ft 10 in (2.08 m)	224 lb (102 kg)	Fr	OrangeAcademy; Ratiopharm Ulm	Rovinj, Croatia
G	33	Carson McCorkle	6 ft 3 in (1.91 m)	185 lb (84 kg)	So	Greensboro Day School	Raleigh, NC

Head coach

- Tony Bennett

Assistant coach(es)

- Jason Williford
- Orlando Vandross
- Kyle Getter

Legend

- (C) Team captain
- (S) Suspended
- (I) Ineligible
- (W) Walk-on
- Injured
- Current redshirt

Roster
Last update: August 31, 2021

=== Coaches ===
Virginia coaching staff
Name	Position	Year with position	Year on coaching staff	Alma mater
Tony Bennett	Dean and Markel Families head coach	13	13	UW-Green Bay
Jason Williford	Associate head coach	4	13	Virginia
Orlando Vandross	Assistant coach	4	7	American International
Kyle Getter	Assistant coach	1	4	Hanover
Brad Soderberg	Director of scouting	1	7	UW-Stevens Point
Larry Mangino	Director of player development	1	6	Montclair State
Johnny Carpenter	Director of player personnel	4	7	Virginia
Isaiah Wilkins	Graduate assistant	1	1	Virginia
Mike Curtis	Strength and conditioning coach	13	13	Virginia
Ethan Saliba	Head athletic trainer	24	39	Kansas
Ronnie Wideman	Associate AD for basketball administration/operations	12	13	Washington State

=== Depth chart ===
Pos.	Starting 5	Bench 1	Bench 2
C	Kadin Shedrick	Francisco Cáffaro
PF	Jayden Gardner		Igor Miličić Jr.
SF	Armaan Franklin	Taine Murray	Carson McCorkle
SG	Reece Beekman	Kody Stattmann	Jayden Nixon
PG	Kihei Clark	Malachi Poindexter	Chase Coleman

== Schedule and results ==
Date time, TV	Rank^{#}	Opponent^{#}	Result	Record	High points	High rebounds	High assists	Site (attendance) city, state
Scrimmage
October 17, 2021; 2:00 pm		Blue vs. White; Pepsi Blue–White Scrimmage	W 8–7	0–0	18 – Gardner	–	–	John Paul Jones Arena; Charlottesville, VA
October 23, 2021	No. 25	VCU; Scrimmage	Undisclosed					John Paul Jones Arena; Charlottesville, VA
Regular season
November 9, 2021*; 9:00 pm, ACCN	No. 25	Navy	L 58–66	0–1	18 – Gardner	10 – Gardner	6 – Beekman	John Paul Jones Arena (13,100); Charlottesville, VA
November 12, 2021*; 7:00 pm, ACCNX/ESPN+	No. 25	Radford	W 73–52	1–1	21 – Franklin	7 – Gardner	5 – Clark	John Paul Jones Arena (13,568); Charlottesville, VA
November 16, 2021*; 8:00 pm, ESPN		at No. 15 Houston	L 47–67	1–2	11 – Franklin	6 – Clark	2 – Clark	Fertitta Center (7,051); Houston, TX
November 19, 2021*; 7:00 pm, ACCRSN		Coppin State	W 68–52	2–2	14 – Gardner	12 – Gardner	6 – Beekman	John Paul Jones Arena (12,980); Charlottesville, VA
November 22, 2021*; 7:00 pm, ESPNU		vs. Georgia; Legends Classic semifinal	W 65–55	3–2	23 – Franklin	7 – Shedrick	3 – Tied	Prudential Center (0); Newark, NJ
November 23, 2021*; 7:30 pm, ESPN2		vs. Providence; Legends Classic championship	W 58–40	4–2	21 – Gardner	13 – Gardner	7 – Beekman	Prudential Center (2,787); Newark, NJ
November 26, 2021*; 7:00 pm, ACCN		Lehigh	W 61–43	5–2	11 – Clark	8 – Gardner	7 – Clark	John Paul Jones Arena (12,647); Charlottesville, VA
November 29, 2021*; 7:00 pm, ESPN2		Iowa; B1G/ACC Challenge	L 74–75	5–3	18 – Gardner	8 – Gardner	5 – Beekman	John Paul Jones Arena (13,542); Charlottesville, VA
December 3, 2021; 8:00 pm, ACCN		Pittsburgh	W 57–56	6–3 (1–0)	15 – Gardner	5 – Tied	6 – Tied	John Paul Jones Arena (14,257); Charlottesville, VA
December 7, 2021*; 6:30 pm, CBSSN		at James Madison	L 49–52	6–4	12 – Gardner	14 – Gardner	5 – Beekman	Atlantic Union Bank Center (8,439); Harrisonburg, VA
December 18, 2021*; 2:00 pm, ACCN		Fairleigh Dickinson	W 82–49	7–4	29 – Gardner	6 – Gardner	6 – Beekman	John Paul Jones Arena (13,197); Charlottesville, VA
December 22, 2021; 8:00 pm, ACCN		Clemson	L 50–67	7–5 (1–1)	20 – Beekman	8 – Franklin	3 – Clark	John Paul Jones Arena (13,857); Charlottesville, VA
January 1, 2022; 8:00 pm, ACCN		at Syracuse	W 74–69	8–5 (2–1)	17 – Tied	11 – Shedrick	8 – Clark	Carrier Dome (17,295); Syracuse, NY
January 4, 2022; 9:00 pm, ACCRSN		at Clemson	W 75–65	9–5 (3–1)	16 – Shedrick	6 – Shedrick	5 – Beekman	Littlejohn Coliseum (5,202); Clemson, SC
January 8, 2022; 1:00 pm, ESPN		at North Carolina	L 58–74	9–6 (3–2)	13 – Beekman	7 – Tied	4 – Beekman	Dean Smith Center (20,638); Chapel Hill, NC
January 12, 2022; 9:00 pm, ESPN2		Virginia Tech; Commonwealth Clash	W 54–52	10–6 (4–2)	15 – Franklin	9 – Caffaro	5 – Beekman	John Paul Jones Arena (13,573); Charlottesville, VA
January 15, 2022; 4:30 pm, ACCRSN		Wake Forest	L 55–63	10–7 (4–3)	18 – Franklin	6 – Caffaro	7 – Beekman	John Paul Jones Arena (13,924); Charlottesville, VA
January 19, 2022; 9:00 pm, ACCN		at Pittsburgh	W 66–61	11–7 (5–3)	19 – Beekman	5 – Caffaro	8 – Beekman	Petersen Events Center (7,595); Pittsburgh, PA
January 22, 2022; 6:00 pm, ACCN		at NC State	L 63–77	11–8 (5–4)	14 – Franklin	8 – Caffaro	6 – Clark	PNC Arena (12,811); Raleigh, NC
January 24, 2022; 7:00 pm, ESPN		Louisville	W 64–52	12–8 (6–4)	15 – Clark	7 – Tied	11 – Beekman	John Paul Jones Arena (13,076); Charlottesville, VA
January 29, 2022; 4:00 pm, ACCN		at Notre Dame	L 65–69	12–9 (6–5)	22 – Gardner	12 – Caffaro	6 – Clark	Edmund P. Joyce Center (8,495); South Bend, IN
February 1, 2022; 6:00 pm, ACCN		Boston College	W 67–55	13–9 (7–5)	19 – Clark	6 – Clark	7 – Beekman	John Paul Jones Arena (12,847); Charlottesville, VA
February 5, 2022; 5:00 pm, ACCN		Miami (FL)	W 71–58	14–9 (8–5)	22 – Franklin	7 – Gardner	10 – Beekman	John Paul Jones Arena (14,089); Charlottesville, VA
February 7, 2022; 7:00 pm, ESPN		at No. 7 Duke	W 69–68	15–9 (9–5)	17 – Gardner	8 – Gardner	9 – Clark	Cameron Indoor Stadium (9,314); Durham, NC
February 12, 2022; 4:00 p.m., ESPN2		Georgia Tech	W 63–53	16–9 (10–5)	26 – Gardner	8 – Caffaro	3 – Beekman	John Paul Jones Arena (14,253); Charlottesville, VA
February 14, 2022; 7:00 pm, ESPN		at Virginia Tech; Commonwealth Clash	L 53–62	16–10 (10–6)	17 – Gardner	14 – Gardner	4 – Beekman	Cassell Coliseum (9,825); Blacksburg, VA
February 19, 2022; 5:00 pm, ACCN		at Miami	W 74–71	17–10 (11–6)	23 – Gardner	13 – Shedrick	7 – Beekman	Watsco Center (5,596); Coral Gables, FL
February 23, 2022; 7:00 pm, ESPN		No. 7 Duke	L 61–65	17–11 (11–7)	25 – Clark	7 – Beekman	7 – Clark	John Paul Jones Arena (14,629); Charlottesville, VA
February 26, 2022; 4:00 pm, ESPN2		Florida State; Senior Day	L 63–64	17–12 (11–8)	21 – Gardner	11 – Caffaro	6 – Clark	John Paul Jones Arena (14,629); Charlottesville, VA
March 5, 2022; 12:00 p.m., ESPN2		at Louisville	W 71–61	18–12 (12–8)	20 – Shedrick	12 – Beekman	6 – Clark	KFC Yum! Center (13,085); Louisville, KY
ACC Tournament
March 9, 2022; 9:30 p.m., ESPN2	(6)	vs. (11) Louisville; Second Round	W 51–50	19–12	17 – Gardner	8 – Caffaro	9 – Beekman	Barclays Center (8,174); Brooklyn, NY
March 10, 2022; 9:30 p.m., ESPN	(6)	vs. (3) No. 25 North Carolina; Quarterfinals	L 43–63	19–13	17 – Gardner	6 – Caffaro	5 – Beekman	Barclays Center (15,994); Brooklyn, NY
NIT Tournament
March 16, 2022; 7:00 p.m., ESPN2		(3) Mississippi State; First Round – Oklahoma Bracket	W 60–57	20–13	16 – Gardner	5 – Caffaro	9 – Clark	John Paul Jones Arena (5,278); Charlottesville, VA
March 20, 2022; 6:00 p.m., ESPN+		at (2) North Texas; Second Round – Oklahoma Bracket	W 71–69 ^{OT}	21–13	17 – Tied	10 – Stattman	9 – Beekman	The Super Pit (4,866); Denton, TX
March 22, 2022; 7:00 pm, ESPN		St. Bonaventure; Quarterfinals – Oklahoma Bracket	L 51–52	21–14	17 – Franklin	9 – Shedrick	6 – Beekman	John Paul Jones Arena (6,829); Charlottesville, VA
*Non-conference game. ^{#}Rankings from AP Poll. (#) Tournament seedings in parentheses. All times are in Eastern Time.

== Rankings ==
Ranking movements Legend: ██ Increase in ranking ██ Decrease in ranking — = Not ranked RV = Received votes
	Week																				
Poll	Pre	1	2	3	4	5	6	7	8	9	10	11	12	13	14	15	16	17	18	19	Final
AP	25	RV	—													RV	—				
Coaches	25	25*	—																		

*Coaches did not release a week 1 poll.
