= 2021–22 Davidson Wildcats men's basketball team =

American college basketball season

2021–22 Davidson Wildcats men's basketball

Atlantic 10 regular-season champions

NCAA tournament, first round
- Conference: Atlantic 10 Conference
- Record: 27–7 (15–3 A-10)
- Head coach: Bob McKillop (33rd season)
- Assistant coaches: Matt McKillop; Will Reigel; Kevin Kuwik
- Home arena: John M. Belk Arena

2021–22 Atlantic 10 men's basketball standings
| | Conf. | | | | Overall |
| Team | W | | L | PCT | W | | L | PCT |
|---|---|---|---|---|---|---|---|---|
| Davidson | 15 | – | 3 | .833 | 27 | – | 7 | .794 |
| Dayton | 14 | – | 4 | .778 | 24 | – | 11 | .686 |
| VCU | 14 | – | 4 | .778 | 22 | – | 10 | .688 |
| St. Bonaventure | 12 | – | 5 | .706 | 23 | – | 10 | .697 |
| Saint Louis | 12 | – | 6 | .667 | 23 | – | 12 | .657 |
| Richmond † | 10 | – | 8 | .556 | 24 | – | 13 | .649 |
| George Washington | 8 | – | 9 | .471 | 12 | – | 18 | .400 |
| Fordham | 8 | – | 10 | .444 | 16 | – | 16 | .500 |
| George Mason | 7 | – | 9 | .438 | 14 | – | 16 | .467 |
| UMass | 7 | – | 11 | .389 | 15 | – | 17 | .469 |
| Rhode Island | 5 | – | 12 | .294 | 15 | – | 16 | .484 |
| La Salle | 5 | – | 13 | .278 | 11 | – | 19 | .367 |
| Saint Joseph's | 5 | – | 13 | .278 | 11 | – | 19 | .367 |
| Duquesne | 1 | – | 16 | .059 | 6 | – | 24 | .200 |
† 2022 A-10 tournament winner

The 2021–22 Davidson Wildcats men's basketball team represented Davidson College during the 2021–22 NCAA Division I men's basketball season. The Wildcats were led by 33rd-year head coach Bob McKillop and played their home games at the John M. Belk Arena in Davidson, North Carolina as members of the Atlantic 10 Conference (A-10). They finished the season 27–7, 15–3 in A-10 play, to finish as regular-season champions. They defeated Fordham and Saint Louis to advance to the championship game of the A-10 tournament where they lost to Richmond. They received an at-large bid to the NCAA tournament as the No. 10 seed in the West Region, where they lost in the first round to Michigan State.

== Previous season ==
In a season limited due to the ongoing COVID-19 pandemic, the Wildcats finished the 2020–21 season 13–9, 7–4 in A-10 play, to finish in third place. They defeated George Mason in the quarterfinals of the A-10 tournament before losing in the semifinals to VCU. The Wildcats received an invitation to the National Invitation Tournament where they lost in the first round to NC State.

== Offseason ==
=== Departures ===
| Name | Number | Pos. | Height | Weight | Year | Hometown | Reason for departure |
|---|---|---|---|---|---|---|---|
| Carter Collins | 24 | G | 6' 3" | 190 | Senior | Chapel Hill, NC | Graduate transferred to Murray State |
| Bates Jones | 25 | F | 6' 8" | 225 | Senior | Charlotte, NC | Graduate transferred to Duke |
| Kellan Grady | 31 | G | 6' 5" | 205 | Senior | Boston, MA | Graduate transferred to Kentucky |

=== Incoming transfers ===
| Name | Num | Pos. | Height | Weight | Year | Hometown | Previous school |
|---|---|---|---|---|---|---|---|
| Foster Loyer | 0 | G | 6' 0" | 170 | Senior | Clarkston, MI | Michigan State |

=== Recruiting classes ===
==== 2021 recruiting class ====
College recruiting information
| Name | Hometown | School | Height | Weight | Commit date |
|---|---|---|---|---|---|
| Chris Ford; SF | Huntersville, NC | North Mecklenburg High School | 6 ft 5 in (1.96 m) | 200 lb (91 kg) | Aug 15, 2020 |
| Chris Ford; SF | Recruit ratings: Scout: Rivals: 247Sports: (0) | | | | |
| Styrmir Snær Þrastarson; SG | Reykjavík, Iceland | Fjölbrautaskóli Suðurlands | 6 ft 7 in (2.01 m) | 200 lb (91 kg) | Jul 3, 2021 |
| Styrmir Snær Þrastarson; SG | Recruit ratings: Scout: Rivals: 247Sports: (0) | | | | |
| Desmond Watson; SF | Columbus, OH | St. Francis DeSales High School | 6 ft 5 in (1.96 m) | 195 lb (88 kg) | Sep 19, 2020 |
| Desmond Watson; SF | Recruit ratings: Scout: Rivals: 247Sports: (0) | | | | |
Overall recruit ranking:
Note: In many cases, Scout, Rivals, 247Sports, On3, and ESPN may conflict in their listings of height and weight.; In these cases, the average was taken. ESPN grades are on a 100-point scale.; Sources: "2021 Team Ranking". Rivals.

==== 2022 recruiting class ====
College recruiting information (2022)
| Name | Hometown | School | Height | Weight | Commit date |
|---|---|---|---|---|---|
| Reed Bailey #32 PF | Wolfeboro, NH | Brewster Academy | 6 ft 9 in (2.06 m) | 190 lb (86 kg) | Aug 4, 2021 |
| Reed Bailey #32 PF | Recruit ratings: Scout: Rivals: 247Sports: ESPN: (80) | | | | |
| Sean Logan; SF | Westfield, NJ | Westfield Senior High School | 6 ft 10 in (2.08 m) | 210 lb (95 kg) | Oct 1, 2021 |
| Sean Logan; SF | Recruit ratings: Scout: Rivals: 247Sports: (0) | | | | |
Overall recruit ranking:
Note: In many cases, Scout, Rivals, 247Sports, On3, and ESPN may conflict in their listings of height and weight.; In these cases, the average was taken. ESPN grades are on a 100-point scale.; Sources: "2022 Team Ranking". Rivals.

== Roster ==
2021–22 Davidson Wildcats men's basketball team
Players
Coaches

| Pos. | # | Name | Height | Weight | Year | Previous school | Hometown |
|---|---|---|---|---|---|---|---|
| G | 0 | Foster Loyer (C) | 6 ft 0 in (1.83 m) | 170 lb (77 kg) | Sr | Clarkston High School; Michigan State | Clarkston, MI |
| G/F | 1 | Lee Hyun-jung | 6 ft 7 in (2.01 m) | 210 lb (95 kg) | Jr | NBA Global Academy | Yongin, South Korea |
| G | 2 | Emory Lanier | 6 ft 3 in (1.91 m) | 180 lb (82 kg) | So | Woodward Academy | Atlanta, GA |
| F | 3 | Sam Mennenga | 6 ft 9 in (2.06 m) | 245 lb (111 kg) | RS So | Westlake Boys High School | Auckland, New Zealand |
| G/F | 4 | Desmond Watson | 6 ft 5 in (1.96 m) | 200 lb (91 kg) | Fr | St. Francis DeSales High School | Columbus, OH |
| G | 5 | Grant Huffman | 6 ft 3 in (1.91 m) | 185 lb (84 kg) | So | St. Edward's High School | Aurora, OH |
| F | 12 | David Kristensen | 6 ft 10 in (2.08 m) | 210 lb (95 kg) | Jr | Marelisborg Gymnasium | Aarhus, Denmark |
| G | 13 | Mike Jones | 6 ft 5 in (1.96 m) | 210 lb (95 kg) | RS Jr | Woodbury High School | Woodbury, MN |
| G | 22 | Drew Dibble (W) | 5 ft 11 in (1.8 m) | 185 lb (84 kg) | RS Sr | University School of Nashville | Nashville, TN |
| F | 23 | Chris Ford | 6 ft 5 in (1.96 m) | 200 lb (91 kg) | Fr | North Mecklenburg High School | Huntersville, NC |
| F | 32 | Nelson Boachie-Yiadom | 6 ft 8 in (2.03 m) | 220 lb (100 kg) | Jr | Loomis Chaffee School | London, England |
| G/F | 34 | Styrmir Snær Þrastarson | 6 ft 7 in (2.01 m) | 200 lb (91 kg) | Fr | Sunderland College | Reykjavík, Iceland |
| F | 35 | Luka Brajkovic | 6 ft 10 in (2.08 m) | 250 lb (113 kg) | Sr | Gymnasium Schillerstraße | Feldkirch, Austria |
| G | 40 | Ben Craig (W) | 6 ft 1 in (1.85 m) | 190 lb (86 kg) | Sr | Christ School | Montreat, NC |
| G/F | 42 | Michael Katsock (W) | 6 ft 6 in (1.98 m) | 190 lb (86 kg) | Fr | St. Albans School | Washington, D.C. |

Head coach

- Bob McKillop (Hofstra)

Assistant coach(es)

- Matt McKillop (Davidson)
- Will Reigel (Davidson)
- Kevin Kuwik (Notre Dame)

Legend

- (C) Team captain
- (S) Suspended
- (I) Ineligible
- (W) Walk-on
- Injured
- Current redshirt

Roster
Last update: September 28, 2025

== Schedule and results ==
| Date time, TV | Rank^{#} | Opponent^{#} | Result | Record | High points | High rebounds | High assists | Site (attendance) city, state |
Exhibition
| November 3, 2021*; 7:00 p.m., ESPN+ | | Ferrum | W 98–56 | – | 21 – Brajkovic | 10 – Mennenga | 5 – Huffman | John M. Belk Arena (2,087); Davidson, NC |
Non-conference regular season
| November 9, 2021*; 7:00 p.m., ESPN+ | | Delaware | W 93–71 | 1–0 | 27 – Loyer | 10 – Mennenga | 5 – 2 tied | John M. Belk Arena (2,779); Davidson, NC |
| November 13, 2021*; 8:30 p.m., WCC Network | | at San Francisco; Chase Center Showcase | L 60–65 | 1–1 | 17 – Brajkovic | 9 – 2 tied | 3 – Loyer | Chase Center (4,175); San Francisco, CA |
| November 18, 2021*; 12:00 p.m., ESPNU | | vs. New Mexico State; Myrtle Beach Invitational quarterfinals | L 64–76 | 1–2 | 19 – Brajkovic | 7 – Brajkovic | 4 – Brajkovic | HTC Center (1,168); Myrtle Beach, SC |
| November 19, 2021*; 2:30 p.m., ESPNU | | vs. Penn; Myrtle Beach Invitational consolation round | W 72–60 | 2–2 | 17 – Mennenga | 11 – Brajkovic | 6 – Brajkovic | HTC Center (1,131); Myrtle Beach, SC |
| November 21, 2021*; 6:00 p.m., ESPNU | | vs. East Carolina; Myrtle Beach Invitational 5th-place game | W 76–67 | 3–2 | 25 – Lee | 10 – Lee | 8 – Jones | HTC Center (1,101); Myrtle Beach, SC |
| November 27, 2021*; 2:00 p.m., ESPN+ | | Robert Morris | W 88–70 | 4–2 | 23 – Lee | 8 – Brajkovic | 5 – Loyer | John M. Belk Arena (2,724); Davidson, NC |
| November 30, 2021*; 7:00 p.m., Stadium | | at Charlotte | W 75–58 | 5–2 | 32 – Lee | 14 – Lee | 4 – Mennenga | Dale F. Halton Arena (4,258); Charlotte, NC |
| December 4, 2021*; 3:00 p.m., ESPN+ | | William & Mary | W 70–46 | 6–2 | 16 – Brajkovic | 10 – Lee | 4 – Lee | John M. Belk Arena (2,899); Davidson, NC |
| December 12, 2021*; 2:00 p.m., FloHoops | | at Northeastern | W 79–69 | 7–2 | 35 – Loyer | 7 – Brajkovic | 5 – Jones | Matthews Arena (1,197); Boston, MA |
| December 18, 2021*; 1:00 p.m., ESPN+ | | Radford | W 74–54 | 8–2 | 24 – Loyer | 6 – Lee | 4 – Loyer | John M. Belk Arena (2,594); Davidson, NC |
| December 21, 2021*; 7:00 p.m., SECN+ | | vs. No. 10 Alabama; C. M. Newton Classic | W 79–78 | 9–2 | 22 – Brajkovic | 7 – Brajkovic | 8 – Loyer | Legacy Arena (9,781); Birmingham, AL |
| December 22, 2021*; 1:00 p.m., ESPN+ | | Johnson & Wales (NC) | W 106–64 | 10–2 | 16 – Kristensen | 11 – Ford | 4 – Huffman | John M. Belk Arena (3,245); Davidson, NC |
A-10 regular season
| January 5, 2022; 7:00 p.m., ESPN+ | | at Saint Joseph's | W 88–73 | 11–2 (1–0) | 25 – Loyer | 10 – Lee | 5 – Loyer | Hagan Arena (750); Philadelphia, PA |
| January 8, 2022; 2:00 p.m., CBSSN | | Rhode Island | W 72–68 | 12–2 (2–0) | 19 – Loyer | 8 – Brajkovic | 5 – Loyer | John M. Belk Arena (2,860); Davidson, NC |
| January 11, 2022; 7:00 p.m., ESPN+ | | UMass | W 77–67 | 13–2 (3–0) | 25 – Brajkovic | 11 – Brajkovic | 6 – Loyer | John M. Belk Arena (2,495); Davidson, NC |
| January 14, 2022; 9:00 p.m., ESPNU | | at Richmond | W 87–84 | 14–2 (4–0) | 29 – Jones | 11 – Brajkovic | 5 – Loyer | Robins Center (6,471); Richmond, VA |
| January 18, 2022; 7:00 p.m., USA | | at VCU; Rescheduled from January 2 | W 63–61 | 15–2 (5–0) | 19 – Brajkovic | 6 – Jones | 4 – Loyer | Siegel Center (7,091); Richmond, VA |
| January 22, 2022; 2:00 p.m., ESPN+ | | at Fordham | W 69–66 | 16–2 (6–0) | 21 – Brajkovic | 11 – Mennega | 3 – Brajkovic | Rose Hill Gymnasium (0); The Bronx, NY |
| January 26, 2022; 8:30 p.m., CBSSN | No. 25 | VCU | L 68–70 | 16–3 (6–1) | 23 – Brajkovic | 12 – Brajkovic | 2 – tied | John M. Belk Arena (3,575); Davidson, NC |
| January 29, 2022; 12:00 p.m., USA | No. 25 | La Salle | W 77–69 | 17–3 (7–1) | 22 – Brajkovic | 8 – Mennenga | 5 – Loyer | John M. Belk Arena (3,938); Davidson, NC |
| February 1, 2022; 7:00 p.m., CBSSN | | at St. Bonaventure | W 81–76 | 18–3 (8–1) | 21 – Loyer | 8 – Brajkovic | 7 – Loyer | Reilly Center (4,015); Olean, NY |
| February 5, 2022; 2:00 p.m., ESPN+ | | at George Washington | W 78–73 | 19–3 (9–1) | 30 – Brajkovic | 8 – Brajkovic | 5 – Loyer | Charles E. Smith Center (1,821); Washington, D.C. |
| February 9, 2022; 7:00 p.m., ESPN+ | | Saint Joseph's | W 73–67 ^{OT} | 20–3 (10–1) | 21 – Loyer | 8 – Lee | 3 – Brajkovic | John M. Belk Arena (3,245); Davidson, NC |
| February 12, 2022; 2:00 p.m., ESPNU | | at Rhode Island | L 65–72 | 20–4 (10–2) | 20 – Loyer | 7 – Brajkovic | 2 – tied | Ryan Center (4,734); Kingston, RI |
| February 14, 2022; 7:00 p.m., ESPN+ | | Duquesne; Rescheduled from December 30 | W 72–61 | 21–4 (11–2) | 24 – Loyer | 11 – Brajkovic | 4 – Loyer | John M. Belk Arena (2,881); Davidson, NC |
| February 19, 2022; 3:30 p.m., CBSSN | | Saint Louis | W 79–58 | 22–4 (12–2) | 29 – Lee | 8 – Brajkovic | 4 – Huffman | John M. Belk Arena (4,039); Davidson, NC |
| February 23, 2022; 7:00 p.m., ESPN+ | | at Duquesne | W 74–50 | 23–4 (13–2) | 27 – Lee | 8 – Brajkovic | 5 – Brajkovic | UPMC Cooper Fieldhouse (1,861); Pittsburgh, PA |
| February 26, 2022; 2:30 p.m., USA | | Fordham | W 66–45 | 24–4 (14–2) | 17 – Mennenga | 11 – Brajkovic | 3 – Lanier | John M. Belk Arena (3,842); Davidson, NC |
| March 2, 2022; 7:00 p.m., ESPN+ | | George Mason | W 73–62 | 25–4 (15–2) | 18 – Lee | 8 – Lee | 3 – Brajkovic | John M. Belk Arena (3,805); Davidson, NC |
| March 5, 2022; 12:30 p.m., USA | | at Dayton | L 76–82 | 25–5 (15–3) | 25 – Loyer | 7 – Lee | 3 – Lee | UD Arena (13,407); Dayton, OH |
A-10 tournament
| March 11, 2022; 12:00 p.m., USA | (1) | vs. (8) Fordham; Quarterfinals | W 74–56 | 26–5 | 15 – Mennenga | 9 – Mennenga | 5 – Mennenga | Capital One Arena; Washington, D.C. |
| March 12, 2022; 12:00 p.m., CBSSN | (1) | vs. (5) Saint Louis; Semifinals | W 84–69 | 27–5 | 21 – Loyer | 10 – Brajkovic | 5 – Brajkovic | Capital One Arena; Washington, D.C. |
| March 13, 2022; 1:00 p.m., CBS | (1) | vs. (6) Richmond; Championship | L 62–64 | 27–6 | 18 – Mennenga | 11 – Brajkovic | 4 – Loyer | Capital One Arena; Washington, D.C. |
NCAA tournament
| March 18, 2022; 9:40 p.m., CBS | (10 W) | vs. (7 W) Michigan State; First round | L 73–74 | 27–7 | 18 – Brajkovic | 6 – tied | 4 – Loyer | Bon Secours Wellness Arena (14,295); Greenville, SC |
*Non-conference game. ^{#}Rankings from AP poll. (#) Tournament seedings in parentheses. W=West. All times are in Eastern.

== Rankings ==
Ranking movements Legend: ██ Increase in ranking ██ Decrease in ranking — = Not ranked RV = Received votes
| | Week | | | | | | | | | | | | | | | | | | | | |
| Poll | Pre | 1 | 2 | 3 | 4 | 5 | 6 | 7 | 8 | 9 | 10 | 11 | 12 | 13 | 14 | 15 | 16 | 17 | 18 | 19 | Final |
|---|---|---|---|---|---|---|---|---|---|---|---|---|---|---|---|---|---|---|---|---|---|
| AP | — | — | — | — | — | — | — | RV | RV | RV | RV | 25 | RV | RV | RV | RV | | | | | Not released |
| Coaches | — | —^ | — | — | — | — | — | — | RV | RV | RV | RV | RV | RV | RV | RV | | | | | |

*AP does not release post-NCAA tournament rankings.
^Coaches do not release a Week 1 poll.
