= 2021–22 Dayton Flyers men's basketball team =

American college basketball season

2021–22 Dayton Flyers men's basketball

ESPN Events Invitational champions

NIT, Second Round
- Conference: Atlantic 10 Conference
- Record: 24–11 (14–4 A–10)
- Head coach: Anthony Grant (5th season)
- Associate head coach: Ricardo Greer (5th season)
- Assistant coaches: Darren Hertz (3rd season); James Kane (2nd season)
- Home arena: UD Arena

2021–22 Atlantic 10 men's basketball standings
	Conf.				Overall
Team	W		L	PCT	W		L	PCT
Davidson	15	–	3	.833	27	–	7	.794
Dayton	14	–	4	.778	24	–	11	.686
VCU	14	–	4	.778	22	–	10	.688
St. Bonaventure	12	–	5	.706	23	–	10	.697
Saint Louis	12	–	6	.667	23	–	12	.657
Richmond †	10	–	8	.556	24	–	13	.649
George Washington	8	–	9	.471	12	–	18	.400
Fordham	8	–	10	.444	16	–	16	.500
George Mason	7	–	9	.438	14	–	16	.467
UMass	7	–	11	.389	15	–	17	.469
Rhode Island	5	–	12	.294	15	–	16	.484
La Salle	5	–	13	.278	11	–	19	.367
Saint Joseph's	5	–	13	.278	11	–	19	.367
Duquesne	1	–	16	.059	6	–	24	.200
† 2022 A-10 tournament winner

The 2021–22 Dayton Flyers men's basketball team represented the University of Dayton in the 2021–22 NCAA Division I men's basketball season. Their head coach was Anthony Grant, in his fifth season with the Flyers. The Flyers played their home games at UD Arena in Dayton, Ohio as members of the Atlantic 10 Conference. They finished the season 24–11, 14–4 in A-10 Play to finish a tie for 2nd place. They defeated UMass in the quarterfinals of the Atlantic 10 tournament before losing in the semifinals to Richmond. They were one of the last four teams not selected for the NCAA tournament and received an at-large bid to the National Invitation Tournament where they defeated Toledo in the first round before losing in the second round to Vanderbilt.

== Previous season ==
In a season limited due to the ongoing COVID-19 pandemic, the Flyers finished the 2020–21 season 14–10, 9–7 in A-10 play to finish in seventh place. In the Atlantic 10 tournament as a 7th seed, they defeated Rhode Island in the second round before losing to VCU in the quarterfinals.

== Offseason ==
=== Departures ===
Name	Number	Pos.	Height	Weight	Year	Hometown	Reason for departure
Rodney Chatman	0	G	6'1"	180	RS Senior	Lithonia, GA	Graduate transferred to Vanderbilt
Ibi Watson	2	G	6'5"	195	RS Senior	Pickerington, OH	Graduated
Luke Frazier	3	G	6'5"	170	Freshman	Mentor, OH	Transferred to Ohio
Jalen Crutcher	10	G	6'2"	175	Senior	Memphis, TN	Graduated
Jordy Tshimanga	32	C	6'11"	278	GS Senior	Montreal, QC	Graduated
Dwayne Cohill	35	G	6'2"	180	Junior	Cleveland, OH	Transferred to Youngstown State
Chase Johnson	40	F	6'9"	226	RS Junior	Ripley, WV	Left the team for personal reasons
Camron Greer	52	G	5'7"	160	Senior	Country Club Hills, IL	Walk-on; graduated

=== Incoming transfers ===
Name	Number	Pos.	Height	Weight	Year	Hometown	Previous School
Toumani Camara	2	F	6'8"	220	Junior	Brussels, Belgium	Georgia
Richard Amaefule	21	F	6'9"	230	Sophomore	London, England	East Tennessee State
Kobe Elvis	24	G	6'2"	170	Sophomore	Brampton, ON	DePaul

=== 2021 recruiting class ===
College recruiting information
Name	Hometown	School	Height	Weight	Commit date
DaRon Holmes II #12 PF	Montverde, FL	Montverde Academy	6 ft 8 in (2.03 m)	195 lb (88 kg)	Oct 24, 2020
DaRon Holmes II #12 PF	Recruit ratings: Scout: Rivals: 247Sports: ESPN:				
Lynn Greer III #29 PG	Philadelphia, PA	IMG Academy	6 ft 2 in (1.88 m)	175 lb (79 kg)	Feb 15, 2021
Lynn Greer III #29 PG	Recruit ratings: Scout: Rivals: 247Sports: ESPN:				
Malachi Smith #30 PG	Bronx, NY	St. Raymond for Boys	6 ft 1 in (1.85 m)	160 lb (73 kg)	Sep 22, 2019
Malachi Smith #30 PG	Recruit ratings: Scout: Rivals: 247Sports: ESPN:				
Kaleb Washington #33 SF	Mableton, GA	Pebblebrook	6 ft 6 in (1.98 m)	190 lb (86 kg)	Sep 22, 2019
Kaleb Washington #33 SF	Recruit ratings: Scout: Rivals: 247Sports: ESPN:				
Overall recruit ranking:
Note: In many cases, Scout, Rivals, 247Sports, On3, and ESPN may conflict in their listings of height and weight.; In these cases, the average was taken. ESPN grades are on a 100-point scale.; Sources: "2021 Team Ranking". Rivals.

== Roster ==
2021–22 Dayton Flyers men's basketball team
Players
Coaches

Pos.	#	Name	Height	Weight	Year	Previous school	Hometown
G	0	Elijah Weaver	6 ft 6 in (1.98 m)	205 lb (93 kg)	RS Jr	USC	Cocoa, FL
F	2	Toumani Camara	6 ft 8 in (2.03 m)	220 lb (100 kg)	Jr	Georgia	Brussels, Belgium
G	3	Lynn Greer III	6 ft 3 in (1.91 m)	185 lb (84 kg)	Fr	IMG Academy	Philadelphia, PA
G	4	Koby Brea	6 ft 6 in (1.98 m)	195 lb (88 kg)	RS Fr	Monsignor Scanlan	Washington Heights, NY
F	10	Kaleb Washington	6 ft 7 in (2.01 m)	190 lb (86 kg)	Fr	Wheeler	Mableton, GA
G	11	Malachi Smith	6 ft 0 in (1.83 m)	170 lb (77 kg)	Fr	St. Raymond School For Boys	Bronx, NY
F	12	Zimi Nwojeki	6 ft 7 in (2.01 m)	220 lb (100 kg)	RS Fr	SPIRE Academy	Quincy, FL
C	14	Moulaye Sissoko	6 ft 9 in (2.06 m)	240 lb (109 kg)	RS Fr	Lincoln Academy	Bamako, Mali
F	15	DaRon Holmes II	6 ft 10 in (2.08 m)	220 lb (100 kg)	Fr	AZ Compass Prep	Goodyear, AZ
F	21	Richard Amaefule	6 ft 9 in (2.06 m)	230 lb (104 kg)	So	East Tennessee State	London, England
F	22	Mustapha Amzil	6 ft 10 in (2.08 m)	220 lb (100 kg)	RS Fr	HBA-Marsky	Helsinki, Finland
G/F	23	R. J. Blakney	6 ft 6 in (1.98 m)	195 lb (88 kg)	RS Fr	Loomis Caffee School	Baltimore, MD
G	24	Kobe Elvis	6 ft 2 in (1.88 m)	170 lb (77 kg)	So	DePaul	Brampton, ON
G	42	Brady Uhl (W)	6 ft 1 in (1.85 m)	190 lb (86 kg)	Fr	Alter	Dayton, OH
G	51	Drew Swerlein (W)	6 ft 0 in (1.83 m)	190 lb (86 kg)	RS Jr	St. Francis De Sales	Perrysburg, OH
G	53	Christian Wilson (W)	6 ft 1 in (1.85 m)	175 lb (79 kg)	RS Sr	Northmont	Dayton, OH

Head coach

- Anthony Grant (Dayton)

Assistant coach(es)

- Ricardo Greer (Pittsburgh)
- Darren Hertz (Florida)
- James Kane (Florida)

Legend

- (C) Team captain
- (S) Suspended
- (I) Ineligible
- (W) Walk-on
- Injured
- Current redshirt

Roster

== Schedule and results ==
Date time, TV	Rank^{#}	Opponent^{#}	Result	Record	High points	High rebounds	High assists	Site (attendance) city, state
Exhibition
November 1, 2021*; 7:00 p.m.		Cedarville	W 94-60		20 – Camara	7 – 3-Way Tie	6 – Elvis	UD Arena (13,233); Dayton, OH
Non-conference regular season
November 9, 2021*; 7:00 p.m., News1/ESPN+		UIC	W 64–54	1–0	15 – Camara	10 – Camara	2 – 4 tied	UD Arena (13,407); Dayton, OH
November 13, 2021*; 6:00 p.m., ESPN+		UMass Lowell	L 58–59	1–1	13 – Holmes	9 – Blakney	3 – Blakney	UD Arena (13,407); Dayton, OH
November 17, 2021*; 7:00 p.m., News1/ESPN+		Lipscomb	L 59–78	1–2	11 – 3 Tied	8 – Sissoko	4 – Smith	UD Arena (13,407); Dayton, OH
November 20, 2021*; 2:00 p.m., BSOH/ESPN+		Austin Peay	L 81–87	1–3	14 – Camara	7 – Amzil	5 – Smith	UD Arena (13,407); Dayton, OH
November 25, 2021*; 12:00 p.m., ESPN2		vs. Miami (FL); ESPN Events Invitational quarterfinals	W 76–60	2–3	15 – Holmes	6 – 3 Tied	7 – Smith	HP Field House (2,652); Kissimmee, FL
November 26, 2021*; 1:30 p.m., ESPN		vs. No. 4 Kansas; ESPN Events Invitational semifinals	W 74–73	3–3	16 – Holmes	7 – Camara	6 – Smith	HP Field House (3,859); Kissimmee, FL
November 28, 2021*; 4:00 p.m., ESPN2		vs. Belmont; ESPN Events Invitational	W 63–61	4–3	11 – Holmes	10 – Holmes	6 – Smith	HP Field House (3,127); Kissimmee, FL
December 1, 2021*; 7:00 p.m., ESPN+		Alabama State	W 93–54	5–3	16 – Camara	8 – Holmes	5 – Smith	UD Arena (13,407); Dayton, OH
December 4, 2021*; 2:00 p.m., BSOH/ESPN+		Northern Illinois	W 79–41	6–3	16 – Weaver	8 – Sissoko	4 – 3 tied	UD Arena (13,407); Dayton, OH
December 8, 2021*; 8:00 p.m., ESPN+		at SMU	L 69–77	6–4	15 – Holmes	8 – Camara	6 – Smith	Moody Coliseum (3,431); University Park, TX
December 12, 2021*; 2:00 p.m., ESPN2		Virginia Tech	W 62–57	7–4	19 – Blakney	8 – Holmes	4 – Smith	UD Arena (13.407); Dayton, OH
December 18, 2021*; 6:30 p.m., SECN		at Ole Miss	L 68–76	7–5	16 – Smith	9 – Camara	11 – Smith	SJB Pavilion (6,199); Oxford, MS
December 21, 2021*; 7:00 p.m., News1/ESPN+		Southern	W 69–61	8–5	15 – Elvis	12 – Camara	4 – 2 tied	UD Arena (13,407); Dayton, OH
Atlantic 10 Regular Season
January 5, 2022; 7:00 p.m., CBSSN		VCU	L 52–53	8–6 (0–1)	16 – Camara	11 – Holmes	3 – Camara	UD Arena (13,407); Dayton, OH
January 8, 2022; 12:00 p.m., USA		at George Washington	W 83–58	9–6 (1–1)	14 – Camara	7 – Holmes	6 – Smith	Charles E. Smith Center (0); Washington, D.C.
January 11, 2022; 7:00 p.m., CBSSN		Saint Louis	W 68–63	10–6 (2–1)	14 – Smith	9 – Camara	5 – Smith	UD Arena (13,407); Dayton, OH
January 15, 2022; 12:30 p.m., USA		at Duquesne	W 72–52	11–6 (3–1)	18 – Holmes	6 – Camara	7 – Smith	UPMC Cooper Fieldhouse (3,012); Pittsburgh, PA
January 18, 2022; 7:00 p.m., ESPN+		St. Bonaventure; Rescheduled from January 2	W 68–50	12–6 (4–1)	20 – Holmes	7 – Holmes	12 – Smith	UD Arena (13,407); Dayton, OH
January 22, 2022; 7:00 p.m., MASN/ESPN+		at George Mason	L 49–50	12–7 (4–2)	12 – Smith	7 – Holmes	3 – Smith	EagleBank Arena (3,222); Fairfax, VA
January 25, 2022; 7:00 p.m., News1/ESPN+		Fordham	W 68–61	13–7 (5–2)	19 – Holmes	12 – Holmes	5 – Elvis	UD Arena (13,407); Dayton, OH
January 28, 2022; 7:00 p.m., ESPN2		Rhode Island	W 53–51	14–7 (6–2)	18 – Camara	10 – Camara	6 – Smith	UD Arena (13,407); Dayton, OH
February 2, 2022; 9:00 p.m., CBSSN		at VCU	W 82–52	15–7 (7–2)	21 – Holmes	8 – Camara	4 – Blakney	Siegel Center (6,724); Richmond, VA
February 5, 2022; 2:00 p.m., ESPNU		at Saint Louis	L 61–72	15–8 (7–3)	20 – Elvis	7 – Holmes	4 – Smith	Chaifetz Arena (9,411); St. Louis, MO
February 9, 2022; 7:00 p.m., News1/ESPN+		Duquesne	W 75–54	16–8 (8–3)	13 – Elvis	7 – Amzil	8 – Smith	UD Arena (13,407); Dayton, OH
February 12, 2022; 2:00 p.m., News1/ESPN+		George Washington	W 80–54	17–8 (9–3)	13 – Elvis	6 – Tied	9 – Smith	UD Arena (13,407); Dayton, OH
February 14, 2022; 9:00 p.m., CBSSN		at Rhode Island; Rescheduled from December 30	W 63–57	18–8 (10–3)	17 – Camara	8 – Blakney	6 – Smith	Ryan Center (4,714); Kingston, RI
February 19, 2022; 1:00 p.m., ESPN+		at Saint Joseph's	W 74–62	19–8 (11–3)	18 – Holmes	10 – Smith	6 – Smith	Hagan Arena (2,361); Philadelphia, PA
February 23, 2022; 7:00 p.m., News1/ESPN+		UMass	W 82–61	20–8 (12–3)	16 – Amzil	6 – Amzil	9 – Smith	UD Arena (13,407); Dayton, OH
February 26, 2022; 2:00 p.m., ESPN+		at La Salle	L 60–62	20–9 (12–4)	18 – Holmes	12 – Holmes	9 – Smith	Tom Gola Arena (2,473); Philadelphia, PA
March 1, 2022; 6:30 p.m., CBSSN		at Richmond	W 55–53	21–9 (13–4)	11 – Camara	12 – Camara	4 – Smith	Robins Center (6,572); Richmond, VA
March 5, 2022; 12:30 p.m., USA		Davidson	W 82–76	22–9 (14–4)	20 – Holmes	10 – Camara	6 – Tied (Smith, Elvis)	UD Arena (13,407); Dayton, OH
A-10 tournament
March 11, 2022; 6:00 p.m., USA/Peacock	(2)	vs. (10) UMass; Quarterfinals	W 75–72	23–9	28 – Holmes II	7 – Camara	6 – Smith	Capital One Arena; Washington, D.C.
March 12, 2022; 3:30 p.m., CBS	(2)	vs. (6) Richmond; Semifinals	L 64–68	23–10	17 – Camara	14 – Camara	5 – Elvis	Capital One Arena (7,799); Washington, D.C.
NIT tournament
March 16, 2022; 7:00 p.m., ESPN+	(1)	at Toledo; First Round – Dayton Bracket	W 74–55	24–10	20 – Holmes II	10 – Brea	8 – Elvis	Savage Arena (3,709); Toledo, OH
March 20, 2022; 3:00 p.m., ESPN2	(1)	at (4) Vanderbilt; Second Round – Dayton Bracket	L 68–70 ^{OT}	24–11	20 – Elvis	8 – Holmes II	5 – Elvis	Memorial Gymnasium (8,323); Nashville, TN
*Non-conference game. ^{#}Rankings from AP Poll. (#) Tournament seedings in parentheses. All times are in Eastern Time.
