= Armaan Franklin =

American basketball player (born 2000)

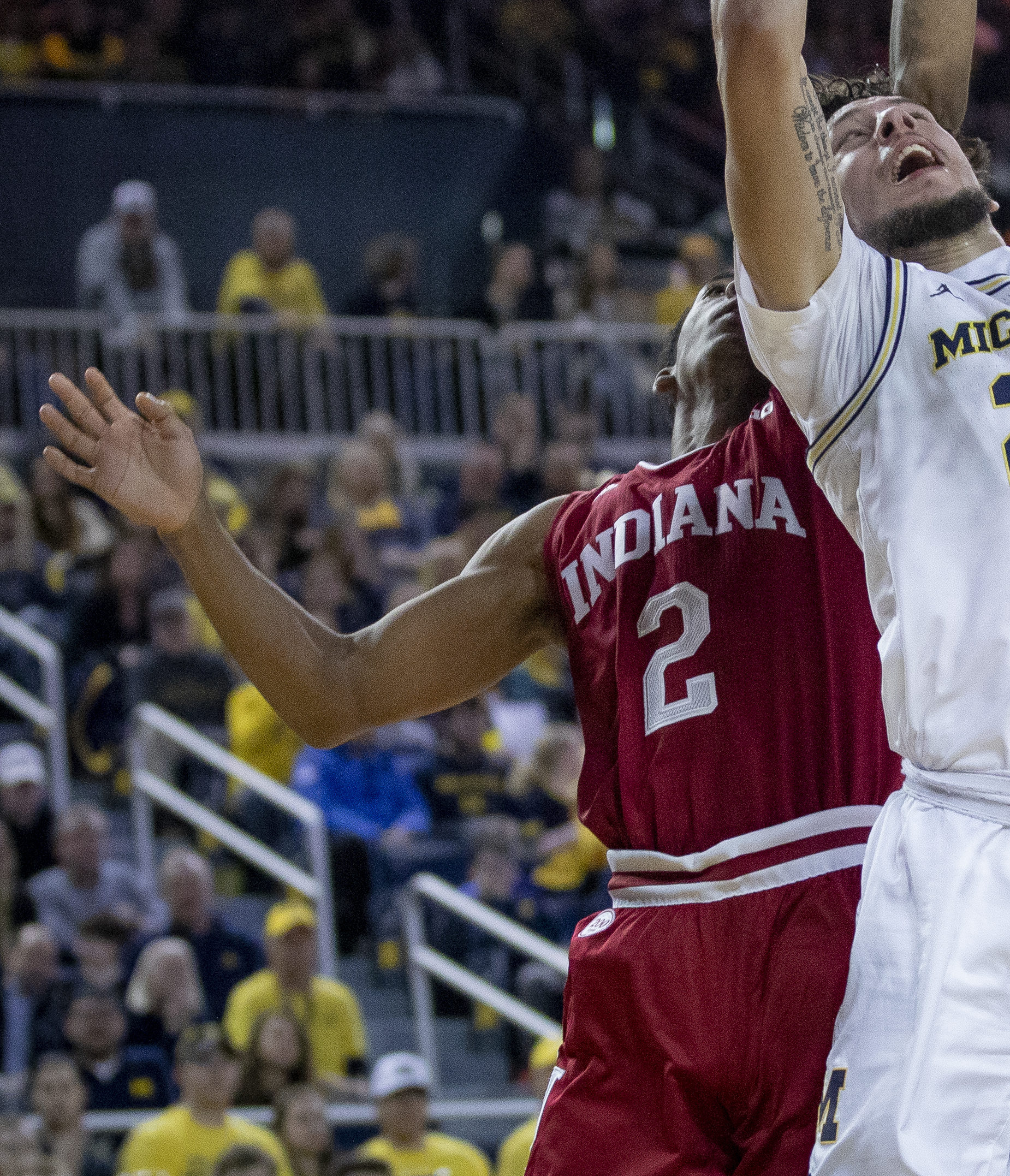
- Franklin with Indiana in 2020

No. 4 – Rasta Vechta
- Position: Shooting guard
- League: Basketball Bundesliga

Personal information
- Born: November 17, 2000 (age 25)
- Listed height: 6 ft 4 in (1.93 m)
- Listed weight: 204 lb (93 kg)

Career information
- High school: Cathedral (Indianapolis, Indiana)
- College: Indiana (2019–2021); Virginia (2021–2023)
- NBA draft: 2023: undrafted
- Playing career: 2023–present

Career history
- 2023–2024: Grand Rapids Gold
- 2024: Hapoel Afula
- 2025: College Park Skyhawks
- 2025–2026: Limoges
- 2026–present: Rasta Vechta
- Stats at NBA.com
- Stats at Basketball Reference

Armaan Franklin (born November 17, 2000) is an American professional basketball player for Rasta Vechta of the Basketball Bundesliga. He played college basketball for the Indiana Hoosiers and the Virginia Cavaliers.

== High school career ==
Franklin was a three-year starter for the Cathedral Irish in Indianapolis, who was coached by Jason Delaney, and led them to a 19–5 record as a junior. He averaged 10.0 points and 3.0 rebounds as a sophomore and 23.0 points, 7.8 rebounds, and 3.8 assists per game as a junior. Following his junior year, he was part of the core team of Indiana Junior All-Stars was part of the Supreme 15 All-State underclass team as chosen by the Indiana Basketball Coaches Association. Franklin averaged 23.8 points, 7.5 rebounds and 2.3 steals per game as a senior in 2018–19. He registered 23 points, 7.8 rebounds and 3.8 assists per game as a junior in 2017–18.

=== Recruiting ===
Franklin received offers from Indiana, Purdue, Louisville, Ohio State, Clemson, Butler and Xavier among others. He committed to the Hoosiers on September 6, 2018, and signed his letter of intent on November 18, 2018.

College recruiting
Name	Hometown	School	Height	Weight	Commit date
Armaan Franklin; SG	Indianapolis, IN	Cathedral HS	6 ft 4 in (1.93 m)	185 lb (84 kg)	Sep 6, 2018
Armaan Franklin; SG	Recruit ratings: Rivals: 247Sports: ESPN: (82)				
Overall recruit ranking: Rivals: 140 247Sports: 151
Note: In many cases, Scout, Rivals, 247Sports, On3, and ESPN may conflict in their listings of height and weight.; In these cases, the average was taken. ESPN grades are on a 100-point scale.; Sources: "Indiana Basketball Commitments". Rivals.; "2019 Indiana Hoosiers Recruiting Class". ESPN.; "2020 Team Ranking". Rivals.

== College career ==
=== Indiana ===
On July 1, 2019, Franklin enrolled at Indiana University. As a freshman, he started in 9 of 32 games and averaged 3.7 ppg while averaging 13.8 mpg. He scored a season-high 17 points, including the game-winning 3-pointer with 15.7 seconds left against Notre Dame. As a sophomore, he averaged 11.4 ppg and 30.1 mpg while starting 20 out of 22 games. Franklin had one of the best games of his career with 13 points, 8 boards, 5 assists in 40 minutes against Stanford. He also held top-10 recruit Ziaire Williams to 1-of-10 shooting. Franklin shot a team-best 42.4 percent from three-point range for the Hoosiers during his sophomore season. He was Indiana's most consistent shooter of the season. He was also the second-leading scorer for Indiana and one of the Big Ten's most improved players. Highlights of the season included Franklin nailing a dramatic game-winner at the buzzer of a 67–65 upset win over AP No. 8 Iowa.

=== Virginia ===
On March 23, 2021, due to the firing of Indiana head coach Archie Miller, Franklin entered the transfer portal, tentatively ending his career as a Hoosier. But he nearly re-committed to Indiana after the hiring of Mike Woodson, ultimately choosing Virginia over Indiana after also considering Illinois, Louisville and Georgia as transfer destinations. Franklin committed to Virginia sight unseen, without ever visiting the Charlottesville campus, due to the COVID-19 pandemic. Franklin, his mother, aunt, his two brothers and his trainer all wrote down what they felt the best destination would be for Franklin's final three years of collegiate eligibility after talking to each staff; all six had Virginia at the top of their lists.

Franklin was eligible for three years of play at Virginia because all Division I athletes who played in the 2020–21 season were granted an extra year of eligibility.

== Professional career ==
=== Grand Rapids Gold (2023–2024) ===
After going undrafted in the 2023 NBA draft, Franklin joined the Denver Nuggets for the 2023 NBA Summer League and on July 18, 2023, he signed with them. However, he was waived on October 13 and on October 30, he joined the Grand Rapids Gold.

=== Hapoel Afula (2024) ===
On August 25, 2024, Franklin signed with Hapoel Afula of the Ligat Winner Sal.

=== College Park Skyhawks (2025) ===
On February 11, 2025, Franklin signed with the College Park Skyhawks.

=== Limoges CSP (2025–present) ===
On July 15, 2025, he signed with Limoges CSP of the LNB Pro A.

== Career statistics ==
Legend
GP	Games played	GS	Games started	MPG	Minutes per game
FG%	Field goal percentage	3P%	3-point field goal percentage	FT%	Free throw percentage
RPG	Rebounds per game	APG	Assists per game	SPG	Steals per game
BPG	Blocks per game	PPG	Points per game	**Bold**	Career high

=== College ===
Year	Team	GP	GS	MPG	FG%	3P%	FT%	RPG	APG	SPG	BPG	PPG
2019–20	Indiana	32	9	13.8	.348	.266	.615	1.6	1.3	.3	.1	3.7
2020–21	Indiana	22	20	**30.1**	**.429**	**.424**	.741	**4.1**	**2.1**	**1.2**	.2	11.4
2021–22	Virginia	**35**	**34**	29.5	.392	.296	**.760**	2.8	1.4	1.0	.3	11.1
2022–23	Virginia	33	33	29.5	.424	.373	.709	4.1	1.4	.9	**.4**	**12.4**
Career		122	96	25.5	.405	.340	.717	3.1	1.5	.8	.2	9.6
