= 2021–22 George Mason Patriots men's basketball team =

American college basketball season

2021–22 George Mason Patriots men's basketball
- Conference: Atlantic 10 Conference
- Record: 14–16 (7–9 A–10)
- Head coach: Kim English (1st season)
- Assistant coaches: Dennis Felton; Duane Simpkins; Nate Tomlinson
- Home arena: EagleBank Arena

2021–22 Atlantic 10 men's basketball standings
	Conf.				Overall
Team	W		L	PCT	W		L	PCT
Davidson	15	–	3	.833	27	–	7	.794
Dayton	14	–	4	.778	24	–	11	.686
VCU	14	–	4	.778	22	–	10	.688
St. Bonaventure	12	–	5	.706	23	–	10	.697
Saint Louis	12	–	6	.667	23	–	12	.657
Richmond †	10	–	8	.556	24	–	13	.649
George Washington	8	–	9	.471	12	–	18	.400
Fordham	8	–	10	.444	16	–	16	.500
George Mason	7	–	9	.438	14	–	16	.467
UMass	7	–	11	.389	15	–	17	.469
Rhode Island	5	–	12	.294	15	–	16	.484
La Salle	5	–	13	.278	11	–	19	.367
Saint Joseph's	5	–	13	.278	11	–	19	.367
Duquesne	1	–	16	.059	6	–	24	.200
† 2022 A-10 tournament winner

The 2021–22 George Mason Patriots Men's basketball team represented George Mason University during the 2021–22 NCAA Division I men's basketball season. The season was the 56th for the program, the first under head coach Kim English, and the ninth as members of the Atlantic 10 Conference. The Patriots played their home games at EagleBank Arena in Fairfax, Virginia.

== Previous season ==
In a season limited due to the ongoing COVID-19 pandemic, the Patriots finished the 2020–21 season 13–9, 8–6 in A-10 play to finish in sixth place. They defeated George Washington in the second round of the A-10 tournament before losing to Davidson in the quarterfinals.

On March 16, 2021, the school fired head coach Dave Paulsen. A week later, the school named Tennessee assistant Kim English the team's new head coach.

== Offseason ==
=== Departures ===
Name	Number	Pos.	Height	Weight	Year	Hometown	Notes
Ian Boyd	32	G	6'4"	230	Grad Senior	Apex, NC	
Greg Calixte	33	F	6'8"	235	Grad Senior	Mount Vernon, NY	Transferred to Bryant
Javon Greene	23	G	6'2"	190	Grad Senior	McDonough, GA	Transferred to South Florida
Bahaïde Haïdara	3	F	6'6"	203	Junior	Montréal, Canada	Transferred to St. Francis (Brooklyn)
Tyler Kolek	20	G	6'3"	190	Sophomore	Cumberland, RI	Transferred to Marquette
A. J. Wilson	12	F	6'7"	230	Grad Senior	Laurel, MD	Transferred to South Carolina

=== Arrivals ===
Name	Number	Pos.	Height	Weight	Year	Hometown	Notes
DeVon Cooper	0	G	6'4"	201	Grad Senior	Louisville, KY	Transferred from Morehead State
Davonte Gaines	3	G	6'7"	175	Junior	Buffalo, NY	Transferred from Tennessee
TJ Gadsden	32	G/F	6'7"	192	Freshman	New York, NY	
Mike Gray	11	G	6'2"	202	Freshman	Fredericksburg, VA	
Blake Jones	24	F	6'10"	195	Freshman	Canberra, Australia	
Joel Kabimba	33	F	6'8"	210	Freshman	Kinshasa, Congo	Transferred from Stetson
D'Shawn Schwartz	15	G/F	6'7"	232	Grad Senior	Colorado Springs, CO	Transferred from Colorado

== Honors and awards ==
All Atlantic 10 First Team

- Josh Oduro

Atlantic 10 Player of the Week

- Josh Oduro - Nov. 15

== Roster ==
2021–22 George Mason Patriots men's basketball team
Players
Coaches

Pos.	#	Name	Height	Weight	Year	Previous school	Hometown
G	0	Devon Cooper	6 ft 4 in (1.93 m)	201 lb (91 kg)	Sr	Morehead State	Louisville, KY
G	1	Ronald Polite	6 ft 2 in (1.88 m)	180 lb (82 kg)	So	Oxon Hill High School	Temple Hills, MD
G	2	Xavier Johnson	6 ft 1 in (1.85 m)	186 lb (84 kg)	Jr	Episcopal High School	Germantown, MD
G	3	Davonte Gaines	6 ft 7 in (2.01 m)	175 lb (79 kg)	Jr	Tennessee	Buffalo, NY
G	4	Sam Shelton (W)	6 ft 1 in (1.85 m)	160 lb (73 kg)	Fr	Dominion High School	Sterling, VA
G/F	5	Otis Frazier III	6 ft 6 in (1.98 m)	212 lb (96 kg)	So	Mt. Zion Prep	Buckeye, AZ
G	10	Jamal Hartwell II	5 ft 10 in (1.78 m)	155 lb (70 kg)	Sr	Fairfax High School	Inglewood, CA
G	11	Mike Gray	6 ft 2 in (1.88 m)	202 lb (92 kg)	Fr	Blue Ridge School	Fredericksburg, VA
G	12	Chase Tucker (W)	6 ft 1 in (1.85 m)	165 lb (75 kg)	Fr	Mount Pisgah Christian	Alpharetta, GA
F	13	Josh Oduro	6 ft 9 in (2.06 m)	235 lb (107 kg)	Jr	Paul VI High School	Gainesville, VA
G/F	15	D'Shawn Schwartz	6 ft 7 in (2.01 m)	232 lb (105 kg)	GS	Colorado	Colorado Springs, CO
G	22	Blake Buchanan	6 ft 5 in (1.96 m)	205 lb (93 kg)	GS	Voyager Academy	Durham, NC
F	24	Blake Jones	6 ft 10 in (2.08 m)	195 lb (88 kg)	Fr	NBA Global Academy	Canberra, Australia
G/F	32	TJ Gadsden	6 ft 7 in (2.01 m)	192 lb (87 kg)	Fr	St. Andrew's Episcopal	New York, NY
F	33	Joel Kabimba	6 ft 8 in (2.03 m)	210 lb (95 kg)	Fr	Stetson	Kinshasa, Congo
F	35	Malik Henry	6 ft 8 in (2.03 m)	225 lb (102 kg)	So	Longview High School	Longview, TX

Head coach

- Kim English (Missouri)

Assistant coach(es)

- Dennis Felton (Howard)
- Duane Simpkins (Maryland)
- Nate Tomlinson (Colorado)

Legend

- (C) Team captain
- (S) Suspended
- (I) Ineligible
- (W) Walk-on
- Injured
- Current redshirt

Roster
Last update: 2024-02-06

== Player statistics ==
Player	GP	GS	MPG	FG%	3FG%	FT%	RPG	APG	SPG	BPG	PPG
Josh Oduro	27	27	31.6	.529	.292	.701	7.4	1.7	1.1	1.7	17.7
D'Shawn Schwartz	30	30	35.8	.457	.380	.735	4.5	2.1	0.5	0.3	15.5
DeVon Cooper	30	30	33.1	.431	.409	.737	2.4	2.1	0.5	0.1	11.6
Davonte Gaines	30	29	32.9	.457	.402	.761	8.1	1.6	0.7	0.4	10.2
Xavier Johnson	28	23	30.6	.385	.341	.727	4.1	4.6	1.1	0.1	7.7
Ronald Polite III	14	2	16.4	.365	.226	.800	1.1	1.4	0.6	0.1	4.9
Jamal Hartwell II	26	4	13.1	.260	.281	.700	0.8	1.1	0.2	0.0	2.9
Otis Frazier III	20	0	7.9	.575	.364	.286	1.9	0.2	0.5	0.2	2.7
Malik Henry	25	3	7.9	.585	.000	.167	2.0	0.2	0.3	0.4	2.0
Mike Gray	8	0	7.1	.333	.125	.500	0.8	0.9	0.4	0.0	1.5
Blake Jones	28	1	8.4	.333	.280	.500	1.3	0.3	0.1	0.2	1.1
Blake Buchanan	12	1	9.1	.400	.375	.000	0.8	0.2	0.1	0.0	0.9
TJ Gadsden	8	0	3.4	.000	.000	1.000	0.9	0.4	0.1	0.0	0.1
Joel Kabimba	4	0	2.8	.000	.000	.000	0.3	0.0	0.0	0.0	0.0

== Schedule and results ==
Date time, TV	Rank^{#}	Opponent^{#}	Result	Record	High points	High rebounds	High assists	Site (attendance) city, state
Non-conference regular season
November 9, 2021*; 7:00 p.m., ESPN+		Stony Brook	W 74–52	1–0	16 – Oduro	9 – Gaines	3 – Cooper	EagleBank Arena (4,558); Fairfax, VA
November 12, 2021*; 7:00 p.m., ESPN+		Penn	W 87–66	2–0	20 – Oduro	9 – Johnson	7 – Johnson	EagleBank Arena (4,053); Fairfax, VA
November 14, 2021*; 6:00 p.m., ESPN+		Morgan State	W 90–53	3–0	22 – Oduro	8 – Gaines	7 – Johnson	EagleBank Arena (2,915); Fairfax, VA
November 17, 2021*; 7:00 p.m., BTN		at No. 20 Maryland	W 71–66	4–0	22 – Schwartz	10 – Gaines	5 – Cooper, Johnson	Xfinity Center (11,948); College Park, MD
November 19, 2021*; 7:00 p.m., NBCSWA+		at James Madison	L 64–67	4–1	19 – Gaines	11 – Gaines	4 – Schwartz	Atlantic Union Bank Center (4,505); Harrisonburg, VA
November 22, 2021*; 9:30 p.m., ESPN+		vs. Washington; Crossover Classic	L 74–77	4–2	21 – Cooper, Oduro	10 – Gaines	4 – Hartwell II	Sanford Pentagon (1,822); Sioux Falls, SD
November 23, 2021*; 7:00 p.m., ESPN+		vs. Nevada; Crossover Classic	L 69–88	4–3	17 – Gaines	7 – Gaines	3 – Johnson, Schwartz	Sanford Pentagon (1,600); Sioux Falls, SD
November 24, 2021*; 9:30 p.m., ESPN+		vs. South Dakota State; Crossover Classic	L 76–80	4–4	29 – Schwartz	7 – Oduro	6 – Cooper	Sanford Pentagon (1,626); Sioux Falls, SD
December 4, 2021*; 7:00 p.m., ESPN+		Old Dominion	L 50–60	4–5	15 – Cooper	12 – Oduro	3 – Hartwell II	EagleBank Arena (3,529); Fairfax, VA
December 7, 2021*; 7:00 p.m., ESPN+		Navy	W 71–65	5–5	32 – Oduro	9 – Gaines	3 – Oduro, Schwartz	EagleBank Arena (2,845); Fairfax, VA
December 18, 2021*; 7:00 p.m., SECN+		at Georgia	W 80–67	6–5	21 – Schwartz	11 – Oduro	9 – Johnson	Stegeman Coliseum (6,432); Athens, GA
December 21, 2021*; 7:00 p.m., ESPN+		American	W 67–44	7–5	18 – Cooper	6 – Henry	6 – Johnson	EagleBank Arena (3,047); Fairfax, VA
December 23, 2021*; 7:00 p.m., BTN		at No. 24 Wisconsin	Canceled due to COVID-19 issues					Kohl Center; Madison, WI
January 1, 2022*; 5:00 pm, ESPN+		at No. 6 Kansas	L 67–76	7–6	15 – Gaines, Schwartz	12 – Gaines	5 – Schwartz	Allen Fieldhouse (16,300); Lawrence, KS
A-10 regular season
January 2, 2022; 2:00 p.m., ESPN+		at Duquesne	Canceled due to COVID-19 issues					UPMC Cooper Fieldhouse; Pittsburgh, PA
January 5, 2022; 7:00 p.m., ESPN+		Rhode Island	Canceled due to COVID-19 issues					EagleBank Arena; Fairfax, VA
January 17, 2022; 2:00 p.m., CBSSN		at George Washington; Revolutionary Rivalry	L 76–77	7–7 (0–1)	27 – Schwartz	11 – Gaines	6 – Johnson	Charles E. Smith Center (0); Washington, D.C.
January 22, 2022; 7:00 p.m., ESPN+		Dayton	W 50–49	8–7 (1–1)	17 – Schwartz	10 – Oduro	4 – Johnson	EagleBank Arena (3,222); Fairfax, VA
January 24, 2022; 7:00 p.m., ESPN+		Saint Joseph's; Rescheduled from January 8	W 77–71	9–7 (2–1)	31 – Oduro	9 – Gaines	5 – Johnson	EagleBank Arena (2,436); Fairfax, VA
January 26, 2022; 7:00 p.m., ESPN+		St. Bonaventure	W 75–66	10–7 (3–1)	20 – Schwartz	8 – Gaines	4 – Oduro	EagleBank Arena (2,687); Fairfax, VA
January 30, 2022; 2:00 p.m., USA		at UMass	W 72–62	11–7 (4–1)	15 – Schwartz	8 – Gaines	9 – Johnson	Mullins Center (2,321); Amherst, MA
February 2, 2022; 7:00 p.m., ESPN+		Saint Louis	L 90–92 ^{2OT}	11–8 (4–2)	32 – Oduro	17 – Gaines	4 – Johnson	EagleBank Arena (2,664); Fairfax, VA
February 5, 2022; 2:00 p.m., ESPN+		at La Salle	L 78–83	11–9 (4–3)	17 – Schwartz	9 – Gaines	10 – Johnson	Tom Gola Arena (2,217); Philadelphia, PA
February 7, 2022; 7:00 p.m., ESPN+		at Richmond; Rescheduled from January 11	L 59–62	11–10 (4–4)	17 – Gaines	10 – Johnson	4 – Gaines	Robins Center (5,354); Richmond, VA
February 9, 2022; 7:00 p.m., CBSSN		Richmond	W 87–84 ^{OT}	12–10 (5–4)	24 – Schwartz	14 – Oduro	9 – Johnson	EagleBank Arena (3,842); Fairfax, VA
February 12, 2022; 4:00 p.m., ESPN+		VCU; Rivalry	L 70–85	12–11 (5–5)	18 – Oduro	9 – Oduro	9 – Johnson	EagleBank Arena (6,333); Fairfax, VA
February 16, 2022; 7:00 p.m., ESPN+		at Saint Joseph's	W 75–70 ^{OT}	13–11 (6–5)	33 – Oduro	8 – Oduro	5 – Cooper	Hagan Arena (1,016); Philadelphia, PA
February 20, 2022; 2:30 p.m., USA		at Fordham	L 47–50	13–12 (6–6)	19 – Johnson	9 – Oduro	4 – Cooper	Rose Hill Gymnasium (0); The Bronx, NY
February 23, 2022; 7:00 p.m., ESPN+		at VCU; Rivalry/Rescheduled from December 30	L 66–72	13–13 (6–7)	22 – Schwartz	7 – Oduro	5 – Johnson	Siegel Center (7,411); Richmond, VA
February 27, 2022; 2:30 p.m., USA		George Washington; Revolutionary Rivalry	W 69–62	14–13 (7–7)	27 – Oduro	14 – Oduro	2 – 3 Tied	EagleBank Arena (4,022); Fairfax, VA
March 2, 2022; 7:00 p.m., ESPN+		at Davidson	L 62–73	14–14 (7–8)	11 – 4 Tied	9 – Oduro	3 – Polite III	John M. Belk Arena (3,805); Davidson, NC
March 5, 2022; 4:00 p.m., ESPN+		UMass	L 80–83 ^{OT}	14–15 (7–9)	21 – Schwartz	6 – 3 Tied	5 – Johnson	EagleBank Arena (3,652); Fairfax, VA
A-10 tournament
March 10, 2022; 12:00 p.m., USA	(9)	vs. (8) Fordham; Second round	L 49–54	14–16	11 – Oduro	10 – Gaines, Oduro	3 – Johnson	Capital One Arena; Washington, D.C.
*Non-conference game. ^{#}Rankings from AP Poll. (#) Tournament seedings in parentheses. All times are in Eastern Time.
