= 2021–22 Saint Louis Billikens men's basketball team =

American college basketball season

2021–22 Saint Louis Billikens men's basketball
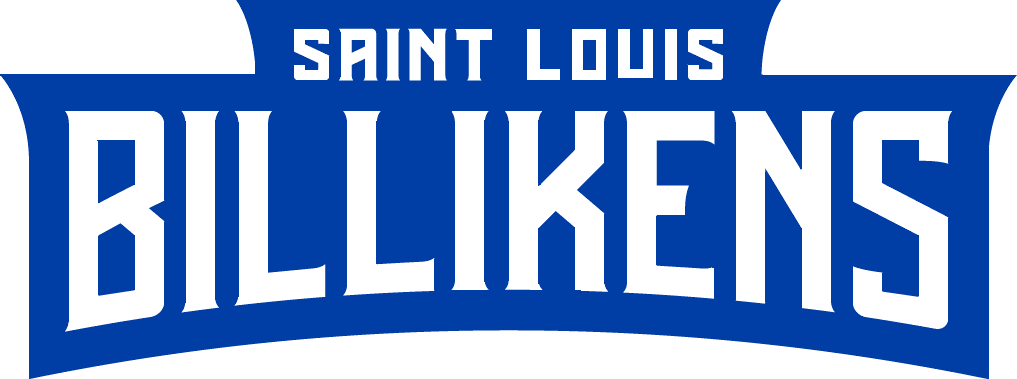

Cancún Challenge champions

NIT, First Round
- Conference: Atlantic 10 Conference
- Record: 23–12 (12–6 A–10)
- Head coach: Travis Ford (6th season)
- Associate head coach: Corey Tate
- Assistant coaches: Ray Giacoletti; Phil Forte
- Home arena: Chaifetz Arena

2021–22 Atlantic 10 men's basketball standings
	Conf.				Overall
Team	W		L	PCT	W		L	PCT
Davidson	15	–	3	.833	27	–	7	.794
Dayton	14	–	4	.778	24	–	11	.686
VCU	14	–	4	.778	22	–	10	.688
St. Bonaventure	12	–	5	.706	23	–	10	.697
Saint Louis	12	–	6	.667	23	–	12	.657
Richmond †	10	–	8	.556	24	–	13	.649
George Washington	8	–	9	.471	12	–	18	.400
Fordham	8	–	10	.444	16	–	16	.500
George Mason	7	–	9	.438	14	–	16	.467
UMass	7	–	11	.389	15	–	17	.469
Rhode Island	5	–	12	.294	15	–	16	.484
La Salle	5	–	13	.278	11	–	19	.367
Saint Joseph's	5	–	13	.278	11	–	19	.367
Duquesne	1	–	16	.059	6	–	24	.200
† 2022 A-10 tournament winner

The 2021–22 Saint Louis Billikens men's basketball team represented Saint Louis University during the 2021–22 NCAA Division I men's basketball season. They were led by head coach Travis Ford, in his sixth season at Saint Louis. The team played their home games at Chaifetz Arena as a member of the Atlantic 10 Conference. They finished the season 23–12, 12–6 in A-10 play to finish in fifth place. They defeated La Salle and St. Bonaventure to advance to the semifinals of the A-10 tournament, where they lost to Davidson. They received an at-large bid to the National Invitation Tournament, where they lost in the first round to Northern Iowa.

== Previous season ==
In a season limited due to the ongoing COVID-19 pandemic, the Billikens finished the 2020–21 season 14–7, 6–4 in A-10 play to finish in a tie for fourth place. They defeated UMass in the quarterfinals of the A-10 tournament before losing to St. Bonaventure in the semifinals. They received an at-large bid to the National Invitation Tournament, where they lost to Mississippi State in the first round.

== Offseason ==
=== Departures ===
Name	Number	Pos.	Height	Weight	Year	Hometown	Reason for departure
Jordan Goodwin	0	G	6'3"	200	Senior	Centreville, IL	Graduated/went undrafted in 2021 NBA draft
Phillip Russell	4	G	5'10"	165	Freshman	St. Louis, MO	Walk-on; transferred to Southeast Missouri State
Joshua Hightower	10	G	6'3"	175	Senior	Cooksville, MD	Walk-on; graduated
Hasahn French	11	F	6'7"	240	Senior	Middletown, NY	Graduated/went undrafted in 2021 NBA draft
Demarius Jacobs	15	G	6'2"	185	Junior	Chicago, IL	Transferred to Ball State
Jimmy Bell Jr.	32	F	6'10"	270	Sophomore	Saginaw, MI	Transferred to Moberly Area CC

=== Incoming transfers ===
Name	Number	Pos.	Height	Weight	Year	Hometown	Previous school
Rashad Williams	11	G	6'2"	184	Senior	Detroit, MI	Oakland
Jordan Nesbitt	15	G	6'6"	185	Freshman	St. Louis, MO	Memphis
DeAndre Jones	55	G	5'11"	160	Senior	Boise, ID	Central Arkansas

=== Recruiting classes ===
==== 2021 recruiting class ====
College recruiting
Name	Hometown	School	Height	Weight	Commit date
Lassina Traore; F	Abidjan, Ivory Coast	Victory Rock Prep	6 ft 9 in (2.06 m)	215 lb (98 kg)	Aug 10, 2021
Lassina Traore; F	Recruit ratings: Rivals: 247Sports: (n/a)				
Overall recruit ranking:
Note: In many cases, Scout, Rivals, 247Sports, On3, and ESPN may conflict in their listings of height and weight.; In these cases, the average was taken. ESPN grades are on a 100-point scale.; Sources:

==== 2022 recruiting class ====
College recruiting (2022)
Name	Hometown	School	Height	Weight	Commit date
Nick Kramer; SG	Saint Louis, MO	Saint Louis University High School	6 ft 4 in (1.93 m)	180 lb (82 kg)	Jun 22, 2021
Nick Kramer; SG	Recruit ratings: (NR)				
Kellen Thames; SG	Maryland Heights, MO	Pattonville High School	6 ft 6 in (1.98 m)	185 lb (84 kg)	Jul 8, 2021
Kellen Thames; SG	Recruit ratings: Rivals: (NR)				
Sincere Parker; SG	Rockford, IL	AZ Compass Prep/Moberly Area Community College	6 ft 4 in (1.93 m)	190 lb (86 kg)	Aug 20, 2021
Sincere Parker; SG	Recruit ratings: (NR)				
Larry Hughes Jr. SG	Saint Louis, MO	Christian Brothers College High School	6 ft 4 in (1.93 m)	165 lb (75 kg)	Apr 12, 2022
Larry Hughes Jr. SG	Recruit ratings: 247Sports: (NR)				
Mouhamadou Cisse; C	Dakar, Senegal	Putnam Science Academy	7 ft 0 in (2.13 m)	245 lb (111 kg)	May 19, 2022
Mouhamadou Cisse; C	Recruit ratings: 247Sports: (NR)				
Overall recruit ranking:
Note: In many cases, Scout, Rivals, 247Sports, On3, and ESPN may conflict in their listings of height and weight.; In these cases, the average was taken. ESPN grades are on a 100-point scale.; Sources:

== Preseason ==
In a poll of the league's head coaches and select media members at the conference's media day, the Billikens were picked to finish in third place in the A-10. Javonte Perkins was the Preseason First Team All-Conference selection, while Yuri Collins was a Third Team Preseason honoree. In the preseason game against Rockhurst, Perkins suffered a torn anterior cruciate ligament (ACL) in his left knee and would miss the remainder of the 2021–22 season.

== Roster ==
2021–22 Saint Louis Billikens men's basketball team
Players
Coaches

Pos.	#	Name	Height	Weight	Year	Previous school	Hometown
G	1	Yuri Collins	6 ft 0 in (1.83 m)	185 lb (84 kg)	So	St. Mary’s	St. Louis, MO
G/F	2	Markhi Strickland	6 ft 5 in (1.96 m)	210 lb (95 kg)	Fr	Victory Rock Prep	Miami, FL
G/F	3	Javonte Perkins (injured)	6 ft 6 in (1.98 m)	215 lb (98 kg)	RS Sr	Miller Career Academy; Southwestern Illinois College	St. Louis, MO
F	5	Francis Okoro	6 ft 9 in (2.06 m)	235 lb (107 kg)	RS Jr	Normal West; Oregon	Imo, Nigeria
G	11	Rashad Williams	6 ft 2 in (1.88 m)	185 lb (84 kg)	Jr	Wayne Memorial; Oakland	Detroit, MI
F	12	Marten Linssen	6 ft 8 in (2.03 m)	240 lb (109 kg)	RS Jr	Schloss-Gymnasium Benrath; Valparaiso/UNC Wilmington	Düsseldorf, Germany
F	13	Andre Lorentsson	6 ft 8 in (2.03 m)	215 lb (98 kg)	Fr	RIG Mark Kinna	Gothenburg, Sweden
G	15	Jordan Nesbitt	6 ft 6 in (1.98 m)	200 lb (91 kg)	Fr	St. Louis Christian Academy; Memphis	St. Louis, MO
G	20	Fred Thatch Jr.	6 ft 3 in (1.91 m)	215 lb (98 kg)	RS So	Sikeston	Sikeston, MO
F	22	Terrence Hargrove Jr.	6 ft 4 in (1.93 m)	215 lb (98 kg)	So	East St. Louis	East St. Louis, IL
F	23	Lassina Traore	6 ft 9 in (2.06 m)	215 lb (98 kg)	Fr	Victory Rock Prep	Abidjan, Ivory Coast
G	24	Gibson Jimerson	6 ft 5 in (1.96 m)	200 lb (91 kg)	RS Fr	Montverde Academy	Richmond, VA
G	30	Brandon Courtney (W)	6 ft 3 in (1.91 m)	200 lb (91 kg)	Jr	Wesclin	Trenton, IL
G	55	DeAndre Jones	5 ft 11 in (1.8 m)	160 lb (73 kg)	RS Sr	Borah; Central Arkansas	Boise, ID

Head coach

- Travis Ford (Kentucky)

Assistant coach(es)

- Corey Tate (Missouri)
- Ray Giacoletti (Minot State University)
- Phil Forte (Oklahoma State)

Legend

- (C) Team captain
- (S) Suspended
- (I) Ineligible
- (W) Walk-on
- Injured
- Current redshirt

Roster

== Schedule and results ==
Date time, TV	Rank^{#}	Opponent^{#}	Result	Record	High points	High rebounds	High assists	Site (attendance) city, state
Exhibition
October 26, 2021*; 7:00 p.m.		Rockhurst	W 84–42		14 – Jimerson	8 – Hargrove Jr.	7 – Collins	Chaifetz Arena; St. Louis, MO
October 31, 2021*; 3:00 p.m.		Lindenwood	W 89–66		17 – Collins	8 – Hargrove Jr.	11 – Collins	Chaifetz Arena; St. Louis, MO
Regular season
November 9, 2021*; 7:00 p.m., BSMW+		Central Arkansas	W 96–61	1–0	17 – Jimerson	7 – Tied	12 – Collins	Chaifetz Arena (4,805); St. Louis, MO
November 10, 2021*; 7:00 p.m., BSMW		Harris–Stowe	W 127–54	2–0	21 – Jimerson	9 – Nesbitt	10 – Collins	Chaifetz Arena (3,574); St. Louis, MO
November 12, 2021*; 7:00 p.m., BSMW		Eastern Illinois	W 86–44	3–0	18 – Jimerson	12 – Okoro	6 – Collins	Chaifetz Arena (5,433); St. Louis, MO
November 16, 2021*; 7:00 p.m., ESPN+		at No. 11 Memphis	L 74–90	3–1	20 – Hargrove Jr.	13 – Okoro	7 – Collins	FedExForum (13,302); Memphis, TN
November 20, 2021*; 4:00 p.m., BSMW		Mercer; Cancún Challenge campus site game	W 75–58	4–1	20 – Thatch Jr.	11 – Hargrove Jr.	7 – Collins	Chaifetz Arena (4,725); St. Louis, MO
November 23, 2021*; 7:30 p.m., CBSSN		vs. Illinois State; Cancún Challenge Riviera semifinal	W 82–76	5–1	19 – Jimerson	10 – Okoro	8 – Collins	Hard Rock Hotel Riviera (103); Cancún, Mexico
November 24, 2021*; 7:30 p.m., CBSSN		vs. Stephen F. Austin; Cancún Challenge Riviera championship	W 79–68	6–1	19 – Tied	8 – Linssen	4 – Collins	Hard Rock Hotel Riviera (461); Cancún, Mexico
November 30, 2021*; 8:00 p.m., Stadium		at Boise State	W 86–82 ^{OT}	7–1	21 – Jimerson	8 – Nesbitt	3 – Jimerson	ExtraMile Arena (6,765); Boise, ID
December 4, 2021*; 5:30 p.m., BSMW		UAB	L 72–77	7–2	17 – Jones	6 – Hargrove Jr.	7 – Collins	Chaifetz Arena (5,743); St. Louis, MO
December 7, 2021*; 7:00 p.m., NBC Digital		Belmont	L 59–64	7–3	21 – Jimerson	7 – Linssen	6 – Collins	Chaifetz Arena (4,521); St. Louis, MO
December 11, 2021*; 4:00 p.m., NBCSN		Boston College	W 79–68	8–3	19 – Jimerson	6 – Tied	19 – Collins	Chaifetz Arena (6,123); St. Louis, MO
December 18, 2021*; 8:00 p.m., CBSSN		No. 13 Auburn	L 70–74	8–4	17 – Hargrove Jr.	12 – Collins	8 – Collins	Chaifetz Arena (8,012); St. Louis, MO
December 22, 2021*; 2:00 p.m., FloHoops		vs. Drake; Las Vegas Showcase	Canceled due to COVID-19					South Point Arena; Enterprise, NV
January 2, 2022; 1:00 p.m., CBSSN		Richmond	W 76–69	9–4 (1–0)	24 – Collins	8 – Okoro	8 – Collins	Chaifetz Arena (4,825); St. Louis, MO
January 8, 2022*; 7:00 p.m., ESPN+		Iona	W 68–67	10–4	15 – Nesbitt	14 – Okoro	3 – Collins	Chaifetz Arena (4,107); St. Louis, MO
January 11, 2022; 6:00 p.m., CBSSN		at Dayton	L 63–68	10–5 (1–1)	23 – Jimerson	8 – Okoro	9 – Collins	UD Arena (13,407); Dayton, OH
January 15, 2022; 1:30 p.m., USA		Fordham	W 63–45	11–5 (2–1)	19 – Jimerson	10 – Tied	9 – Collins	Chaifetz Arena (4,486); St. Louis, MO
January 20, 2022; 7:00 p.m., BSMW/ESPN+		at UMass; Rescheduled from December 30	L 85–91	11–6 (2–2)	23 – Jimerson	7 – Okoro	9 – Collins	Mullins Center (1,665); Amherst, MA
January 23, 2022; 1:30 p.m., USA		UMass	W 90–59	12–6 (3–2)	31 – Jimerson	12 – Nesbitt	12 – Collins	Chaifetz Arena (5,136); St. Louis, MO
January 26, 2022; 7:00 p.m., BSMW/ESPN+		George Washington	W 80–67	13–6 (4–2)	28 – Jimerson	11 – Okoro	12 – Collins	Chaifetz Arena (4,238); St. Louis, MO
January 29, 2022; 2:00 p.m., ESPN+		at Duquesne	W 77–53	14–6 (5–2)	14 – Okoro	8 – Okoro	10 – Collins	UPMC Cooper Fieldhouse (2,421); Pittsburgh, PA
February 2, 2022; 6:00 p.m., ESPN+		at George Mason	W 92-90 ^{2OT}	15–6 (6–2)	35 – Collins	9 – Okoro	13 – Collins	EagleBank Arena (2,664); Fairfax, VA
February 5, 2022; 1:00 p.m., ESPNU		Dayton; Arch Baron Cup	W 72–61	16–6 (7–2)	17 – Linssen	8 – Collins	6 – Collins	Chaifetz Arena (9,411); St. Louis, MO
February 8, 2022; 6:00 p.m., ESPN+		at La Salle	W 75–57	17–6 (8–2)	19 – Okoro	10 – Thatch Jr.	8 – Collins	Tom Gola Arena (1,121); Philadelphia, PA
February 11, 2022; 8:00 p.m., ESPN2		St. Bonaventure	L 61–68	17–7 (8–3)	18 – Collins	7 – Thatch Jr.	7 – Collins	Chaifetz Arena (7,924); St. Louis, MO
February 14, 2022; 4:00 p.m., CBSSN		at St. Bonaventure; Rescheduled from January 8	L 79–83	17–8 (8–4)	18 – Nesbitt	13 – Thatch Jr.	10 – Collins	Reilly Center (3,418); Olean, NY
February 16, 2022; 7:00 p.m., BSMW+/ESPN+		La Salle; Rescheduled from January 5	W 90–64	18–8 (9–4)	21 – Thatch Jr.	7 – Thatch Jr.	6 – Collins	Chaifetz Arena (4,671); St. Louis, MO
February 19, 2022; 2:30 p.m., CBSSN		at Davidson	L 58–79	18–9 (9–5)	10 – Collins	11 – Okoro	6 – Thatch Jr.	John M. Belk Arena (4,039); Davidson, NC
February 22, 2022; 7:00 p.m., BSMW		Saint Joseph's	W 72–61	19–9 (10–5)	17 – Collins	10 – Okoro	6 – Collins	Chaifetz Arena (4,435); St. Louis, MO
February 25, 2022; 6:00 p.m., ESPN2		at Richmond	L 66–68	19–10 (10–6)	23 – Okoro	15 – Okoro	4 – Collins	Robins Center (6,750); Richmond, VA
March 2, 2022; 6:00 p.m., ESPN+		at Rhode Island	W 80–74	20–10 (11–6)	22 – Jimerson	13 – Thatch Jr.	9 – Collins	Ryan Center (4,611); Kingston, RI
March 5, 2022; 3:00 p.m., ESPN2		VCU	W 69–65	21–10 (12–6)	19 – Jimerson	6 – Okoro	7 – Collins	Chaifetz Arena (9,125); St. Louis, MO
A-10 tournament
March 10, 2022; 2:30 p.m., USA	(5)	vs. (12) La Salle; Second Round	W 71–51	22–10	19 – Jimerson	13 – Okoro	4 – Thatch Jr.	Capital One Arena (4,309); Washington, D.C.
March 11, 2022; 2:30 p.m., USA	(5)	vs. (4) St. Bonaventure; Quarterfinals	W 57–56	23–10	20 – Jimerson	12 – Okoro	9 – Collins	Capital One Arena; Washington, D.C.
March 12, 2022; 1:00 p.m., CBSSN	(5)	vs. (1) Davidson; Semifinals	L 69–84	23–11	14 – Hargrove Jr.	6 – Hargrove Jr.	7 – Collins	Capital One Arena; Washington, D.C.
NIT
March 16, 2022; 7:00 p.m., ESPN+	(3)	Northern Iowa; First Round – SMU Bracket	L 68–80	23–12	20 – Jimmerson	13 – Okoro	5 – Thatch Jr.	Chaifetz Arena (3,521); St. Louis, MO
*Non-conference game. ^{#}Rankings from AP Poll. (#) Tournament seedings in parentheses. All times are in Central Time.

== Rankings ==
Ranking movements Legend: ██ Increase in ranking ██ Decrease in ranking — = Not ranked RV = Received votes
	Week																				
Poll	Pre	1	2	3	4	5	6	7	8	9	10	11	12	13	14	15	16	17	18	19	Final
AP	—		—	—	—	—	—	—	—	—	—	—	—	—	—	—	—	—	—	—	Not released
Coaches	—			—	RV	—	—	—	—	—	—	—	—	—	—	—	—	—	—	—	—

*AP does not release post-NCAA Tournament rankings.
