= 2021–22 Duquesne Dukes men's basketball team =

American college basketball season

2021–22 Duquesne Dukes men's basketball
- Conference: Atlantic 10 Conference
- Record: 6–24 (1–16 A–10)
- Head coach: Keith Dambrot (5th season)
- Assistant coaches: Rick McFadden; Terry Weigand; Charles Thomas; Carl Thomas
- Home arena: UPMC Cooper Fieldhouse

2021–22 Atlantic 10 men's basketball standings
	Conf.				Overall
Team	W		L	PCT	W		L	PCT
Davidson	15	–	3	.833	27	–	7	.794
Dayton	14	–	4	.778	24	–	11	.686
VCU	14	–	4	.778	22	–	10	.688
St. Bonaventure	12	–	5	.706	23	–	10	.697
Saint Louis	12	–	6	.667	23	–	12	.657
Richmond †	10	–	8	.556	24	–	13	.649
George Washington	8	–	9	.471	12	–	18	.400
Fordham	8	–	10	.444	16	–	16	.500
George Mason	7	–	9	.438	14	–	16	.467
UMass	7	–	11	.389	15	–	17	.469
Rhode Island	5	–	12	.294	15	–	16	.484
La Salle	5	–	13	.278	11	–	19	.367
Saint Joseph's	5	–	13	.278	11	–	19	.367
Duquesne	1	–	16	.059	6	–	24	.200
† 2022 A-10 tournament winner

The 2021–22 Duquesne Dukes men's basketball team represented Duquesne University during the 2021–22 NCAA Division I men's basketball season. The team were led by fifth-year head coach Keith Dambrot, and played their home games at the UPMC Cooper Fieldhouse in Pittsburgh, Pennsylvania as a member of the Atlantic 10 Conference.

== Previous season ==
In a season limited due to the ongoing COVID-19 pandemic, the Dukes finished the 2020–21 season 9–9, 7–7 in A-10 play to finish in ninth place. In the A-10 tournament they defeated to Richmond in the second round before losing to St. Bonaventure in the quarterfinals.

== Offseason ==
=== Departures ===
Name	Number	Pos.	Height	Weight	Year	Hometown	Reason for departure
Tavian Dunn-Martin	0	G	5'8"	155	RS Senior	Huntington, WV	Graduate transferred to Florida Gulf Coast
Maceo Austin	3	G	6'5"	190	Sophomore	Sharon, PA	Left the team for personal reasons
Marcus Weathers	5	G	6'5"	215	RS Senior	Overland Park, KS	Graduate transferred to SMU
Ryan Murphy	20	G	6'5"	185	RS Senior	Calabasas, CA	Graduated
Michael Hughes	21	C	6'8"	240	RS Senior	Liberty, MO	Graduated
Amari Kelly	23	F	6'9"	230	RS Sophomore	Long Island, NY	Transferred to UNC Wilmington
Andre Harris	30	F	6'7"	225	Freshman	Mesa, AZ	Transferred
Jett Roesing	31	G	6'4"	180	Freshman	Pittsburgh, PA	Transferred to Iona
Chad Baker	44	F	6'7"	190	Freshman	Santo Domingo, DR	Transferred to San Diego State

=== Incoming transfers ===
Name	Number	Pos.	Height	Weight	Year	Hometown	Previous School
Leon Ayers III	0	G	6'6"	180	Senior	Troy, MI	Mercer
Tre Williams	4	C	6'7"	250	Junior	Reynoldsburg, OH	Indiana State
Rodney Gunn Jr.	21	F	6'7"	245	GS Senior	Columbia, SC	Lenoir–Rhyne
Davis Larson	30	F	6'5"	190	GS Senior	Sheboygan, WI	Hillsdale
Kevin Easley Jr.	35	F	6'7"	225	RS Junior	Indianapolis, IN	TCU

=== 2021 recruiting class ===
College recruiting information
Name	Hometown	School	Height	Weight	Commit date
Andy Barba; SF	Cleveland, OH	International Sports Academy	6 ft 6 in (1.98 m)	205 lb (93 kg)	Sep 28, 2020
Andy Barba; SF	Recruit ratings: Scout: Rivals: (NR)				
Jackie Johnson; SF	Chatham, VA	Hargrave Military Academy	5 ft 10 in (1.78 m)	180 lb (82 kg)	Apr 16, 2021
Jackie Johnson; SF	Recruit ratings: Scout: Rivals: (NR)				
Primo Spears; PG	Windsor, CT	Mt. Zion Preparatory School	6 ft 2 in (1.88 m)	188 lb (85 kg)	Feb 26, 2021
Primo Spears; PG	Recruit ratings: Scout: Rivals: (NR)				
Overall recruit ranking:
Note: In many cases, Scout, Rivals, 247Sports, On3, and ESPN may conflict in their listings of height and weight.; In these cases, the average was taken. ESPN grades are on a 100-point scale.; Sources: "2021 Team Ranking". Rivals.

== Roster ==
2021–22 Duquesne Dukes men's basketball team
Players
Coaches

Pos.	#	Name	Height	Weight	Year	Previous school	Hometown
G	0	Leon Ayers III	6 ft 5 in (1.96 m)	185 lb (84 kg)	Sr	Henry Ford; Mercer	Troy, MI
G	1	Tyson Acuff	6 ft 4 in (1.93 m)	190 lb (86 kg)	So	Cass Tech	Detroit, MI
G	2	Toby Okani	6 ft 7 in (2.01 m)	195 lb (88 kg)	So	Cushing Academy	Orange, NJ
C	4	Tre Williams	6 ft 7 in (2.01 m)	250 lb (113 kg)	Jr	Woodstock Academy; Indiana State	Reynoldsburg, OH
G	5	Jackie Johnson III	5 ft 11 in (1.8 m)	185 lb (84 kg)	Fr	Hargrave Military Academy	Wichita, KS
F	14	Andy Barba	6 ft 6 in (1.98 m)	200 lb (91 kg)	Fr	International Sports Academy	Cleveland, OH
F	21	Rodney Gunn Jr.	6 ft 7 in (2.01 m)	230 lb (104 kg)	GS	Irmo; Lenoir–Rhyne	Columbia, SC
G	22	Mike Bejelka	6 ft 2 in (1.88 m)	185 lb (84 kg)	So	International Sports Academy	Solon, OH
G	23	Primo Spears	6 ft 3 in (1.91 m)	185 lb (84 kg)	Fr	Mt. Zion Prep	Harford, CT
G	25	Jaylen Cole-Williams (W)	6 ft 1 in (1.85 m)	175 lb (79 kg)	So	TLAP Sports Academy	Reston, VA
G/F	30	Davis Larson	6 ft 5 in (1.96 m)	190 lb (86 kg)	GS	North; Hillsdale College	Sheboygan, WI
F	31	Luke Patten	6 ft 5 in (1.96 m)	180 lb (82 kg)	Fr	IMG Academy	Butler, PA
F	33	Noah Buono (W)	6 ft 6 in (1.98 m)	175 lb (79 kg)	Sr	Brick Township HS; Ramapo	Brick Township, NJ
F	34	Austin Rotroff	6 ft 10 in (2.08 m)	240 lb (109 kg)	Sr	Wauseon	Wauseon, OH
F	35	Kevin Easley Jr.	6 ft 7 in (2.01 m)	230 lb (104 kg)	RS Jr	Lawrence North; TCU	Indianapolis, IN
C	55	Mounir Hima	6 ft 11 in (2.11 m)	240 lb (109 kg)	RS Fr	St. Benedict's Prep	Tillabéri, Niger

Head coach

- Keith Dambrot (Akron)

Assistant coach(es)

- Rick McFadden (Akron)
- Terry Weigand (Ashland)
- Charles Thomas (Eastern Michigan)
- Carl Thomas (Eastern Michigan)

Legend

- (C) Team captain
- (S) Suspended
- (I) Ineligible
- (W) Walk-on
- Injured
- Current redshirt

Roster

== Schedule and results ==
Date time, TV	Rank^{#}	Opponent^{#}	Result	Record	Site (attendance) city, state
Non-conference regular season
November 9, 2021*; 7:00 p.m., ESPN+		Rider	W 73–61	1–0	UPMC Cooper Fieldhouse (2,276); Pittsburgh, PA
November 13, 2021*; 7:00 p.m., ESPN+		Hofstra	L 63–73	1–1	UPMC Cooper Fieldhouse (2,312); Pittsburgh, PA
November 15, 2021*; 7:00 p.m., ESPN+		Weber State	L 59–63	1–2	UPMC Cooper Fieldhouse (2,045); Pittsburgh, PA
November 19, 2021*; 5:45 p.m., ESPN3		vs. Northeastern; Paradise Jam Tournament quarterfinals	L 55–71	1–3	Sports and Fitness Center; Saint Thomas, USVI
November 20, 2021*; 5:45 p.m.		vs. Colorado; Paradise Jam Tournament consolation	L 76–84 ^{OT}	1–4	Sports and Fitness Center (723); Saint Thomas, USVI
November 22, 2021*; 1:00 p.m.		vs. Bradley; Paradise Jam Tournament consolation	W 78–70	2–4	Sports and Fitness Center; Saint Thomas, USVI
November 28, 2021*; 2:00 p.m., ESPN+		American	W 88–79	3–4	UPMC Cooper Fieldhouse (1,583); Pittsburgh, PA
December 1, 2021*; 7:00 p.m., ESPN+		Bowling Green	L 70–78	3–5	UPMC Cooper Fieldhouse (2,111); Pittsburgh, PA
December 4, 2021*; 7:00 p.m., ESPN+		at Marshall	L 71–72	3–6	Cam Henderson Center; Huntington, WV
December 7, 2021*; 8:30 p.m., FS1		at DePaul	L 67–87	3–7	Wintrust Arena; Chicago, IL
December 11, 2021*; 1:00 p.m., ESPN+		New Hampshire	W 64–62	4–7	UPMC Cooper Fieldhouse; Pittsburgh, PA
December 19, 2021*; 1:00 p.m., ESPN+		vs. UC Irvine	W 76–54	5–7	LeBron James Arena (211); Akron, OH
December 22, 2021*; 3:00 p.m., ESPN+		Wofford	Canceled due to COVID-19 protocols		UPMC Cooper Fieldhouse; Pittsburgh, PA
Atlantic 10 regular season
January 2, 2022; 2:00 p.m., ESPN+		George Mason	Postponed due to COVID-19		UPMC Cooper Fieldhouse; Pittsburgh, PA
January 8, 2022; 12:00 p.m., ESPN+		at UMass	W 78–74	6–7 (1–0)	Mullins Center (1,978); Amherst, MA
January 12, 2022; 7:00 p.m., ESPN+		at Fordham	L 71–72	6–8 (1–1)	Rose Hill Gymnasium (0); Bronx, NY
January 15, 2022; 12:30 p.m., NBC Sports		Dayton	L 52–72	6–9 (1–2)	UPMC Cooper Fieldhouse (3,012); Pittsburgh, PA
January 21, 2022; 7:00 p.m., ESPN2		St. Bonaventure	L 56–64	6–10 (1–3)	UPMC Cooper Fieldhouse (3,032); Pittsburgh, PA
January 26, 2022; 7:00 p.m., ESPN+		at Saint Joseph's	L 61–72	6–11 (1–4)	Hagan Arena (1,278); Philadelphia, PA
January 29, 2022; 2:00 p.m., ESPN+		Saint Louis	L 53–77	6–12 (1–5)	UPMC Cooper Fieldhouse (2,421); Pittsburgh, PA
February 1, 2022; 7:00 p.m., ESPN+		Richmond	L 57–74	6–13 (1–6)	UPMC Cooper Fieldhouse (2,211); Pittsburgh, PA
February 5, 2022; 4:00 p.m., ESPN+		at VCU	L 62–71	6–14 (1–7)	Siegel Center (7,293); Richmond, VA
February 9, 2022; 7:00 p.m., ESPN+		at Dayton	L 54–75	6–15 (1–8)	UD Arena (13,407); Dayton, OH
February 12, 2022; 5:30 p.m., CBSSN		Fordham	L 54–65	6–16 (1–9)	UPMC Cooper Fieldhouse (2,002); Pittsburgh, PA
February 14, 2021; 7:00 p.m., ESPN+		at Davidson; Rescheduled from December 30	L 61–72	6–17 (1–10)	John M. Belk Arena (2,881); Davidson, NC
February 16, 2022; 7:30 p.m., ESPN+		George Washington; Rescheduled from January 5	L 52–73	6–18 (1–11)	UPMC Cooper Fieldhouse (1,985); Pittsburgh, PA
February 19, 2022; 6:00 p.m., ESPNU		at St. Bonaventure	L 55–81	6–19 (1–12)	Reilly Center (4,620); Olean, NY
February 23, 2022; 7:00 p.m., ESPN+		Davidson	L 50–74	6–20 (1–13)	UPMC Cooper Fieldhouse (1,861); Pittsburgh, PA
February 26, 2022; 12:30 p.m., NBC Sports		at Rhode Island	L 54–70	6–21 (1–14)	Ryan Center (4,668); Kingston, RI
March 2, 2022; 7:00 p.m., ESPN+		at George Washington	L 93–98 ^{3OT}	6–22 (1–15)	Charles E. Smith Center (1,164); Washington, D.C.
March 5, 2022; 2:00 p.m., ESPN+		La Salle	L 76–85	6–23 (1–16)	UPMC Cooper Fieldhouse (2,003); Pittsburgh, PA
A-10 tournament
March 9, 2022; 3:30 p.m., ESPN+	(14)	vs. (11) Rhode Island; First round	L 77–79	6–24	Capital One Arena (2,283); Washington, D.C.
*Non-conference game. ^{#}Rankings from AP Poll. (#) Tournament seedings in parentheses. All times are in Eastern Time.
