= 2021–22 St. Bonaventure Bonnies men's basketball team =

American college basketball season

2021–22 St. Bonaventure Bonnies men's basketball
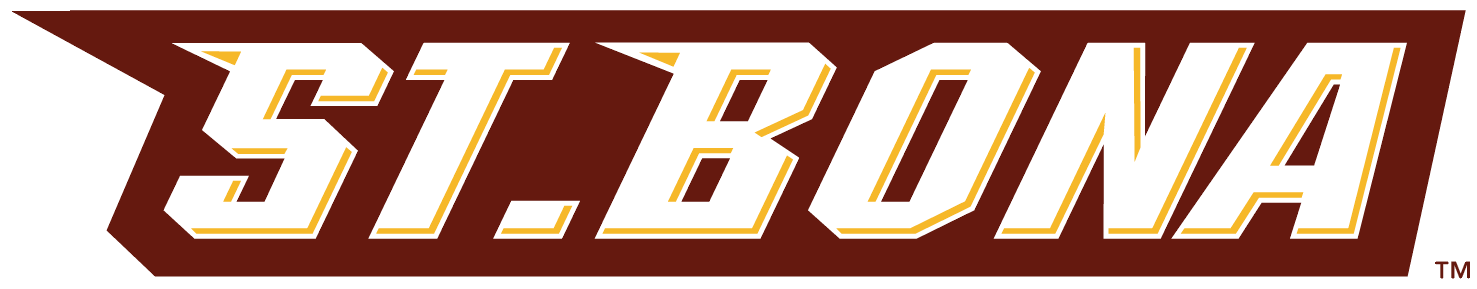

Charleston Classic champions

NIT, Semifinals
- Conference: Atlantic 10 Conference
- Record: 23–10 (12–5 A-10)
- Head coach: Mark Schmidt (15th season)
- Assistant coaches: Steve Curran; Sean Neal; Chris Lowe
- Home arena: Reilly Center

2021–22 Atlantic 10 men's basketball standings
	Conf.				Overall
Team	W		L	PCT	W		L	PCT
Davidson	15	–	3	.833	27	–	7	.794
Dayton	14	–	4	.778	24	–	11	.686
VCU	14	–	4	.778	22	–	10	.688
St. Bonaventure	12	–	5	.706	23	–	10	.697
Saint Louis	12	–	6	.667	23	–	12	.657
Richmond †	10	–	8	.556	24	–	13	.649
George Washington	8	–	9	.471	12	–	18	.400
Fordham	8	–	10	.444	16	–	16	.500
George Mason	7	–	9	.438	14	–	16	.467
UMass	7	–	11	.389	15	–	17	.469
Rhode Island	5	–	12	.294	15	–	16	.484
La Salle	5	–	13	.278	11	–	19	.367
Saint Joseph's	5	–	13	.278	11	–	19	.367
Duquesne	1	–	16	.059	6	–	24	.200
† 2022 A-10 tournament winner

The 2021–22 St. Bonaventure Bonnies men's basketball team represented St. Bonaventure University during the 2021–22 NCAA Division I men's basketball season. The Bonnies, led by 15th-year head coach Mark Schmidt, played their home games at the Reilly Center in Olean, New York as members of the Atlantic 10 Conference (A-10). They finished the season 23–10, 12–5 in A-10 play, to finish in fourth place. They lost in the quarterfinals of the A-10 tournament to Saint Louis. They received an at-large bid to the National Invitation Tournament where they defeated Colorado, Oklahoma and Virginia to advance to the semifinals. There they lost to Xavier.

The Bonnies were ranked No. 23 in the preseason AP poll, the first time they had ever been ranked in the preseason AP poll.

== Previous season ==
In a season limited due to the ongoing COVID-19 pandemic, the Bonnies finished 2020–21 at 16–5, 11–4 in A-10 play, to win the regular-season A-10 championship. They defeated Duquesne, Saint Louis and VCU to win the A-10 tournament. As a result, they received the conference's automatic bid to the NCAA tournament as the No. 9 seed in the East region. There they lost to LSU in the first round.

== Offseason ==
=== Coaching changes ===
Assistant coach Tray Woodall left the Bonnies to join Fordham's coaching staff on July 21, 2021. On August 6, the school announced it had hired former UMass player and Texas–Rio Grand Valley assistant Chris Lowe to replace Woodall.

=== Departures ===
Name	Number	Pos.	Height	Weight	Year	Hometown	Reason for departure
Eddie Creal	2	G	6' 4"	210	Junior	Joliet, IL	Graduate transferred to Lindenwood
Alpha Okoli	3	G	6' 5"	200	Junior	Los Angeles, CA	Graduate transferred to Cal State East Bay
Alejandro Vasquez	10	G	6' 3"	200	Sophomore	Queens, NY	Transferred to Tarleton State
Josh Bell	11	G	6' 5"	190	Freshman	Frederick, MD	Transferred
Jermaine Taggart	23	G	6' 3"	162	Freshman	Rochester, NY	Transferred to Saint Rose
Jalen Shaw	40	F/C	6' 10"	248	Junior	Elgin, IL	Transferred

=== Incoming transfers ===
Name	Number	Pos.	Height	Weight	Year	Hometown	Previous school
Quadry Adams	2	G	6' 3"	190	Sophomore	Piscataway, NJ	Wake Forest
Linton Brown	4	G	6' 5"	210	Junior	Delray Beach, FL	Indian River State College
Oluwasegun Durosinmi	10	F/C	6' 9"	235	Sophomore	Lagos, Nigeria	Harcum College
Abdoul Karim Coulibaly	12	F	6' 9"	235	Junior	Bamako, Mali	Pittsburgh

=== Recruiting classes ===
==== 2021 recruiting class ====
College recruiting information
Name	Hometown	School	Height	Weight	Commit date
Joryam Saizonou; PG	Almere, Netherlands	Beckley Prep	6 ft 3 in (1.91 m)	175 lb (79 kg)	Apr 23, 2021
Joryam Saizonou; PG	Recruit ratings: 247Sports:				
Brett Rumpel; SG	Geneva, OH	SPIRE Academy	6 ft 4 in (1.93 m)	N/A	Jun 17, 2021
Brett Rumpel; SG	Recruit ratings: No ratings found				
Justin Ndjock-Tadjore; SG	Gatineau, QC	Cégep de l'Outaouais	6 ft 8 in (2.03 m)	175 lb (79 kg)	Mar 1, 2021
Justin Ndjock-Tadjore; SG	Recruit ratings: No ratings found				
Anouar Mellouk; PF	Almere, Netherlands	Fork Union Military Academy	6 ft 8 in (2.03 m)	185 lb (84 kg)	May 7, 2021
Anouar Mellouk; PF	Recruit ratings: No ratings found				
Overall recruit ranking:
Note: In many cases, Scout, Rivals, 247Sports, On3, and ESPN may conflict in their listings of height and weight.; In these cases, the average was taken. ESPN grades are on a 100-point scale.; Sources: "2021 Team Ranking". Rivals.

==== 2022 recruiting class ====
College recruiting information (2022)
Name	Hometown	School	Height	Weight	Commit date
Barry Evans; SF	Baltimore, MD	Putnam Science Academy	6 ft 7 in (2.01 m)	198 lb (90 kg)	Sep 6, 2021
Barry Evans; SF	Recruit ratings: No ratings found				
Overall recruit ranking:
Note: In many cases, Scout, Rivals, 247Sports, On3, and ESPN may conflict in their listings of height and weight.; In these cases, the average was taken. ESPN grades are on a 100-point scale.; Sources: "2022 Team Ranking". Rivals.

== Preseason ==
=== Preseason rankings ===
For the first time since 1971, the Bonnies were ranked in the AP poll when the preseason poll was announced on October 18, 2021. The Bonnies were ranked No. 23 in the poll.

== Roster ==
2021–22 St. Bonaventure Bonnies men's basketball team
Players
Coaches

Pos.	#	Name	Height	Weight	Year	Previous school	Hometown
G	0	Kyle Lofton	6 ft 3 in (1.91 m)	185 lb (84 kg)	Sr	Putnam Science Academy	Hillside, NJ
G	1	Dominick Welch	6 ft 5 in (1.96 m)	205 lb (93 kg)	Sr	SPIRE Institute	Buffalo, NY
G	2	Quadry Adams	6 ft 3 in (1.91 m)	190 lb (86 kg)	So	Wake Forest	Piscataway, NJ
G	3	Joryam Saizonou	6 ft 3 in (1.91 m)	182 lb (83 kg)	Fr	The McCallie School	Almere, Netherlands
G	4	Linton Brown	6 ft 5 in (1.96 m)	210 lb (95 kg)	Jr	Indian River State College	Delray Beach, FL
G	5	Jaren Holmes	6 ft 4 in (1.93 m)	210 lb (95 kg)	Sr	Ranger College	Romulus, MI
F/C	10	Oluwasegun Durosinmi	6 ft 9 in (2.06 m)	235 lb (107 kg)	So	Harcum College	Lagos, Nigeria
G	11	Justin Ndjock-Tadjore	6 ft 7 in (2.01 m)	190 lb (86 kg)	Fr	Cégep de l'Outaouais	Gatineau, QC
F	12	Abdoul Karim Coulibaly	6 ft 9 in (2.06 m)	235 lb (107 kg)	Jr	Pittsburgh	Bamako, Mali
F	20	Pedro Rossi (W)	6 ft 8 in (2.03 m)	215 lb (98 kg)	Fr	DME Academy	Bahía Blanca, Argentina
F/C	21	Osun Osunniyi	6 ft 10 in (2.08 m)	220 lb (100 kg)	Sr	Putnam Science Academy	Pleasantville, NJ
G	33	Jalen Adaway	6 ft 5 in (1.96 m)	215 lb (98 kg)	RS Sr	Miami (OH)	Logansport, IN
F	41	Anouar Mellouk	6 ft 8 in (2.03 m)	200 lb (91 kg)	Fr	Fork Union Military Academy	Almere, Netherlands

Head coach

- Mark Schmidt (Boston College)

Assistant coach(es)

- Steve Curran (Merrimack)
- Dwayne Lee (Saint Joseph's)
- Sean Neal (La Salle)

Legend

- (C) Team captain
- (S) Suspended
- (I) Ineligible
- (W) Walk-on
- Injured
- Current redshirt

Roster
Last update: November 20, 2024

== Schedule and results ==
Date time, TV	Rank^{#}	Opponent^{#}	Result	Record	High points	High rebounds	High assists	Site (attendance) city, state
Exhibition
November 4, 2021*; 7:00 p.m., ESPN+	No. 23	Alfred	W 95–54		19 – Brown	8 – Brown	5 – tied	Reilly Center (2,622); Olean, NY
Non-conference regular season
November 9, 2021*; 7:00 p.m., ESPN+	No. 23	Siena; Franciscan Cup	W 75–47	1–0	17 – Lofton	7 – Welch	6 – Lofton	Reilly Center (4,617); Olean, NY
November 14, 2021*; 5:00 p.m., ESPN+	No. 23	Canisius	W 69–60	2–0	17 – tied	9 – Holmes	4 – Lofton	Reilly Center (3,943); Olean, NY
November 18, 2021*; 2:00 p.m., ESPN2	No. 22	vs. Boise State; Charleston Classic quarterfinals	W 67–61	3–0	17 – Lofton	10 – Holmes	7 – Lofton	TD Arena; Charleston, SC
November 19, 2021*; 2:30 p.m., ESPN2	No. 22	vs. Clemson; Charleston Classic semifinals	W 68–65	4–0	22 – Lofton	11 – Osunniyi	5 – Holmes	TD Arena; Charleston, SC
November 21, 2021*; 7:30 p.m., ESPN	No. 22	vs. Marquette; Charleston Classic championship	W 70–54	5–0	19 – Holmes	13 – Holmes	4 – tied	TD Arena (4,820); Charleston, SC
November 27, 2021*; 2:00 p.m., ESPN+	No. 16	Northern Iowa	L 80–90	5–1	21 – Lofton	7 – Welch	7 – Lofton	Reilly Center (4,296); Olean, NY
December 1, 2021*; 7:00 p.m., ESPN+		Coppin State	W 93–81	6–1	24 – Holmes	16 – Adaway	9 – Lofton	Reilly Center (2,976); Olean, NY
December 4, 2021*; 4:00 p.m., NBCSports.com		Buffalo	W 68–65	7–1	16 – Adaway	11 – Adaway	8 – Holmes	Reilly Center (4,860); Olean, NY
December 8, 2021*; 7:00 p.m., ESPN+		Loyola (MD)	W 84–71	8–1	22 – tied	7 – Osunniyi	9 – Holmes	Reilly Center (2,720); Olean, NY
December 11, 2021*; 3:30 p.m., ESPN2		vs. No. 15 UConn; Never Forget Tribute Classic	L 64–74	8–2	19 – Holmes	10 – Adaway	5 – Holmes	Prudential Center; Newark, NJ
December 17, 2021*; 4:00 p.m., ESPN2		vs. Virginia Tech; Hall of Fame Shootout	L 49–86	8–3	11 – Welch	6 – Adaway	3 – Lofton	Spectrum Center; Charlotte, NC
December 22, 2021*; 12:00 p.m., FloSports		at Northeastern	Canceled due to COVID-19 protocols					Matthews Arena; Boston, MA
A-10 regular season
December 30, 2021*; 4:00 p.m., ESPN+		at George Washington	Postponed due to COVID-19 issues					Charles E. Smith Center; Washington, D.C.
January 11, 2022; 7:00 p.m., ESPN+		at La Salle	W 80–76 ^{OT}	9–3 (1–0)	18 – Lofton	15 – Osunniyi	8 – Lofton	Tom Gola Arena (1,321); Philadelphia, PA
January 14, 2022; 7:30 p.m., ESPN2		VCU	W 73–53	10–3 (2–0)	25 – Adaway	8 – Adaway	6 – Lofton	Reilly Center (3,512); Olean, NY
January 18, 2022; 7:00 p.m., ESPN+		at Dayton; Rescheduled from January 2	L 50–68	10–4 (2–1)	15 – Adaway	6 – Adaway	5 – Lofton	UD Arena (13,407); Dayton, OH
January 21, 2022; 7:00 p.m., ESPN2		at Duquesne	W 64–56	11–4 (3–1)	21 – Osunniyi	17 – Osunniyi	3 – Lofton	UPMC Cooper Fieldhouse (3,032); Pittsburgh, PA
January 26, 2022; 7:00 p.m., ESPN+		at George Mason	L 66–75	11–5 (3–2)	15 – Adaway	7 – Welch	5 – Holmes	EagleBank Arena (2,687); Fairfax, VA
January 29, 2022; 2:00 p.m., USA		Saint Joseph's	W 80–69	12–5 (4–2)	22 – Adaway	10 – Osunniyi	4 – Lofton	Reilly Center (4,860); Olean, NY
February 1, 2022; 7:00 p.m., CBSSN		Davidson	L 76–81	12–6 (4–3)	21 – Adaway	9 – Lofton	8 – Lofton	Reilly Center (4,015); Olean, NY
February 4, 2022; 7:00 p.m., ESPN2		at Richmond	L 61–71	12–7 (4–4)	16 – Adaway	7 – Osunniyi	6 – Lofton	Robins Center (5,803); Richmond, VA
February 8, 2022; 7:00 p.m., ESPN+		Fordham; Rescheduled from January 5	W 76–51	13–7 (5–4)	21 – Welch	12 – Osunniyi	5 – Holmes	Reilly Center (3,634); Olean, NY
February 11, 2022; 9:00 p.m., ESPN2		at Saint Louis	W 68–61	14–7 (6–4)	16 – Lofton	8 – Holmes	8 – Lofton	Chaifetz Arena (7,924); St. Louis, MO
February 14, 2022; 5:00 p.m., CBSSN		Saint Louis; Rescheduled from January 8	W 83–79	15–7 (7–4)	21 – Osunniyi	6 – tied	8 – Lofton	Reilly Center (3,418); Olean, NY
February 16, 2022; 7:00 p.m., ESPN+		UMass	W 83–71	16–7 (8–4)	23 – Welch	10 – Welch	17 – Lofton	Reilly Center (3,452); Olean, NY
February 19, 2022; 6:00 p.m., ESPNU		Duquesne	W 81–55	17–7 (9–4)	21 – Adaway	10 – Osunniyi	6 – Lofton	Reilly Center (4,620); Olean, NY
February 22, 2022; 7:00 p.m., CBSSN		Rhode Island	W 73–55	18–7 (10–4)	23 – Adaway	9 – tied	5 – Lofton	Reilly Center (3,833); Olean, NY
February 26, 2022; 6:00 p.m., CBSSN		at Saint Joseph's	W 54–52	19–7 (11–4)	14 – Adaway	8 – Lofton	6 – Holmes	Hagan Arena (2,356); Philadelphia, PA
March 1, 2022; 8:30 p.m., CBSSN		at VCU	L 51–74	19–8 (11–5)	12 – Adaway	7 – Adaway	5 – Lofton	Siegel Center (7,509); Richmond, VA
March 4, 2022; 7:00 p.m., ESPN2		Richmond	W 72–65	20–8 (12–5)	21 – Adaway	7 – Adaway	3 – Lofton	Reilly Center (4,860); Olean, NY
A-10 tournament
March 11, 2022; 2:30 p.m., USA	(4)	vs. (5) Saint Louis; Quarterfinals	L 56–57	20–9	18 – Adaway	9 – Osunniyi	4 – tied	Capital One Arena (5,894); Washington, D.C.
NIT tournament
March 15, 2022; 11:00 p.m., ESPN2		at (4) Colorado; First round – Oklahoma Bracket	W 76–68	21–9	17 – Adaway	10 – Osunniyi	8 – Lofton	CU Events Center (3,791); Boulder, CO
March 20, 2022; 8:00 p.m., ESPNU		at (1) Oklahoma; Second round – Oklahoma Bracket	W 70–68	22–9	23 – Holmes	10 – Osunniyi	3 – Holmes	Lloyd Noble Center (4,324); Norman, OK
March 22, 2022; 7:00 p.m., ESPN		at Virginia; Quarterfinals – Oklahoma Bracket	W 52–51	23–9	10 – Welch	10 – Welch	– Lofton	John Paul Jones Arena (6,829); Charlottesville, VA
March 29, 2022; 7:00 p.m., ESPN		vs. (2) Xavier; Semifinals	L 77–84	23–10	25 – Welch	25 – Welch	11 – Lofton	Madison Square Garden; New York, NY
*Non-conference game. ^{#}Rankings from AP poll. (#) Tournament seedings in parentheses. All times are in Eastern.

== Rankings ==
Ranking movements Legend: ██ Increase in ranking ██ Decrease in ranking — = Not ranked RV = Received votes
	Week																			
Poll	Pre	1	2	3	4	5	6	7	8	9	10	11	12	13	14	15	16	17	18	Final
AP	23	22	16	RV	RV	—	—	—	—	—	—	—	—	—	—	—	—	—	—	Not released
Coaches	24	24^	16	25	RV	—	—	—	—	—	—	—	—	—	—	—	—	—	—	

*AP does not release post-NCAA tournament rankings.
^Coaches did not release a Week 1 poll.
