= 2022 National Invitation Tournament =

Men's college basketball tournament

- Season: 2021–22
- Teams: 32
- Finals site: Madison Square Garden, New York City
- Champions: Xavier Musketeers (2nd title)
- Runner-up: Texas A&M Aggies (1st title game)
- Semifinalists: St. Bonaventure Bonnies (7th semifinal); Washington State Cougars (2nd semifinal)
- Winning coach: Jonas Hayes (1st title)
- MVP: Colby Jones (Xavier)
- Attendance: 3,551 (championship game)

The 2022 National Invitation Tournament was a single-elimination tournament of 32 NCAA Division I men's college basketball teams not selected to participate in the 2022 NCAA tournament. The tournament began on March 15 and ended on March 31. The first three rounds were played on campuses, with the semifinal and championship final played at Madison Square Garden in New York City.

== Participants ==
Teams and pairings for the 2022 NIT were released by the NIT Committee at 9 p.m. Eastern time Sunday, March 13, on ESPNU. It returned to its previous 32-team field for the first time since 2019. In 2021, Memphis won the NIT Title.

=== Automatic qualifiers ===
After the tournament's cancellation in 2020 and its reduction in 2021 because of the ongoing COVID-19 pandemic, the 2022 tournament returned to the NIT's standard format of guaranteeing berths to teams which had the best regular season record in their conference, but failed to win their conference tournament.

Team	Conference	Overall record	Appearance	Last bid
Long Beach State	Big West	20–12	9th	2016
North Texas	C-USA	24–6	1st	Never
Towson	CAA	25–8	1st	Never
Cleveland State	Horizon	20–10	6th	2012
Princeton	Ivy League	23–5	7th	2016
Iona	MAAC	25–7	7th	2015
Toledo	MAC	26–7	11th	2021
Northern Iowa	MVC	19–11	2nd	2012
Nicholls	Southland	21–11	1st	Never
Alcorn State	SWAC	15–15	3rd	1985
Texas State	Sun Belt	21–7	1st	Never

=== At-large bids ===
The following teams were awarded at-large bids.

Team	Conference	Overall record	Appearance	Last bid
Belmont	Ohio Valley	25–7	5th	2017
BYU	WCC	22–10	15th	2018
Colorado	Pac-12	21–11	12th	2019
Dayton	Atlantic 10	23–10	27th	2021
Florida	SEC	19–13	11th	2016
Mississippi State	SEC	18–15	11th	2021
Missouri State	Missouri Valley	23–10	10th	2011
Oklahoma	Big 12	18–15	8th	2004
Oregon	Pac-12	19–14	12th	2018
Saint Louis	Atlantic 10	23–11	20th	2021
Santa Clara	WCC	21–11	5th	1989
SMU	American	23–8	5th	2021
St. Bonaventure	Atlantic 10	20–9	17th	2016
Texas A&M	SEC	23–12	8th	2015
Utah State	Mountain West	18–15	10th	2008
Vanderbilt	SEC	17–16	13th	2015
VCU	Atlantic 10	21–9	6th	2008
Virginia	ACC	19–13	14th	2013
Wake Forest	ACC	23–9	7th	2006
Washington State	Pac-12	19–14	6th	2011
Xavier	Big East	18–13	9th	2019

== Schedule ==
The 2022 National Invitation Tournament began on Tuesday, March 15 with the first round. First-round games were played both on Tuesday, and Wednesday, March 16. The semifinals were held on Tuesday, March 29, and the championship on Thursday, March 31.

== Bracket ==
The 32-team bracket was announced on March 13. It was released via the NIT Selection Show on ESPNU at 9 p.m. EDT on March 13.

First round March 15–16; Campus sites
1	Dayton^	74
8	Toledo	55
4	Vanderbilt	82
5	Belmont	71
3	Florida	79
6	Iona	74
2	Xavier	72
7	Cleveland State	68

Second round March 20; Campus sites
1	Dayton^	68
4	Vanderbilt	70^{OT}
3	Florida	56
2	Xavier	72

Quarterfinal; March 22; Campus sites
4	Vanderbilt	73
2	Xavier	75

^ Dayton's first-round game played at Toledo due to UD Arena hosting First Four 2022 NCAA tournament games
^ Dayton's second-round game played at Vanderbilt due to UD Arena hosting OHSAA Boys Basketball State Tournament games

First round March 15–16; Campus sites
1	Oklahoma	89
8	Missouri State	72
4	Colorado	68
5	St. Bonaventure	76
3	Mississippi State^	57
6	Virginia	60
2	North Texas	67^{OT}
7	Texas State	63

Second round March 20; Campus sites
1	Oklahoma	68
5	St. Bonaventure	70
6	Virginia	71^{OT}
2	North Texas	69

Quarterfinal; March 22; Campus sites
5	St. Bonaventure	52
6	Virginia	51

^ Game played at Virginia due to construction work at Humphrey Coliseum

First round March 15–16; Campus sites
1	SMU	68
8	Nicholls	58
4	Washington State	63
5	Santa Clara	50
3	Saint Louis	68
6	Northern Iowa	80
2	BYU	93
7	Long Beach State	72

Second round March 19–20; Campus sites
1	SMU	63
4	Washington State	75
6	Northern Iowa	71
2	BYU	90

Quarterfinal; March 23; Campus sites
4	Washington State	77
2	BYU	58

First round March 15–16; Campus sites
1	Texas A&M	74
8	Alcorn State	62
4	Utah State	72
5	Oregon	83
3	VCU	90
6	Princeton	79
2	Wake Forest	74
7	Towson	64

Second round March 19; Campus sites
1	Texas A&M	75
5	Oregon	60
3	VCU	74
2	Wake Forest	80

Quarterfinal; March 23; Campus sites
1	Texas A&M	67
2	Wake Forest	52

Semifinals; March 29; Madison Square Garden
5	St. Bonaventure	77
2	Xavier	84
4	Washington State	56
1	Texas A&M	72

Final; March 31; Madison Square Garden
2	Xavier	73
1	Texas A&M	72

== Media ==
ESPN, Inc. had exclusive television rights to all of the NIT games. It telecasted every game across ESPN, ESPN2, ESPNU, and ESPN+. Westwood One had exclusive radio rights to the semifinals and the championship.

== See also ==
- 2022 Women's National Invitation Tournament
