= 2021–22 VCU Rams men's basketball team =

American college basketball season

2021–22 VCU Rams men's basketball

NIT, Second Round
- Conference: Atlantic 10 Conference
- Record: 22–10 (14–4 A-10)
- Head coach: Mike Rhoades (5th season)
- Assistant coaches: J. D. Byers; Brent Scott; Jamal Brunt
- Home arena: Stuart C. Siegel Center

2021–22 Atlantic 10 men's basketball standings
	Conf.				Overall
Team	W		L	PCT	W		L	PCT
Davidson	15	–	3	.833	27	–	7	.794
Dayton	14	–	4	.778	24	–	11	.686
VCU	14	–	4	.778	22	–	10	.688
St. Bonaventure	12	–	5	.706	23	–	10	.697
Saint Louis	12	–	6	.667	23	–	12	.657
Richmond †	10	–	8	.556	24	–	13	.649
George Washington	8	–	9	.471	12	–	18	.400
Fordham	8	–	10	.444	16	–	16	.500
George Mason	7	–	9	.438	14	–	16	.467
UMass	7	–	11	.389	15	–	17	.469
Rhode Island	5	–	12	.294	15	–	16	.484
La Salle	5	–	13	.278	11	–	19	.367
Saint Joseph's	5	–	13	.278	11	–	19	.367
Duquesne	1	–	16	.059	6	–	24	.200
† 2022 A-10 tournament winner

The 2021–22 VCU Rams men's basketball team represented Virginia Commonwealth University during the 2021–22 NCAA Division I men's basketball season. They are led by fifth-year head coach is Mike Rhoades and played their home games at the Siegel Center in Richmond, Virginia as a member of the Atlantic 10 Conference. They finished the season 22–10, 14–4 in A-10 play to finish in a tie for second place. As the No. 3 seed in the A-10 tournament, they lost in the quarterfinals to Richmond. They received an at-large bid to the National Invitation Tournament where they defeated Princeton in the first round before losing to Wake Forest.

== Previous season ==
In a season limited due to the ongoing COVID-19 pandemic, the Rams finished the 2020–21 season 19–7, 10–4 in A-10 play to finish in second place. In the A-10 tournament, they defeated Dayton and Davidson to advance to the championship game where they lost to St. Bonaventure. VCU received an at-large berth to the NCAA tournament as the No. 10 seed in the West region. Due to several positive COVID-19 tests in the VCU program prior to their First Round game against Oregon, the game was declared a no-contest and Oregon advanced to the second round, making VCU the first team ever to forfeit a game in the NCAA tournament.

== Offseason ==
=== Departures ===
Name	Number	Pos.	Height	Weight	Year	Hometown	Notes
Bones Hyland	5	G	6'3"	173	Sophomore	Wilmington, Delaware	Declared for NBA draft; selected 26th overall by the Denver Nuggets
Corey Douglas Jr.	13	F	6'8"	210	RS Senior	Louisville, Kentucky	Graduated
Brendan Medley-Bacon	34	C	7'1"	240	Junior	Baltimore, Maryland	Transferred to McNeese State

=== Incoming transfers ===
Name	Number	Pos.	Height	Weight	Year	Hometown	Previous school
Marcus Tsohonis	5	G	6'3"	190	Junior	Portland, Oregon	Transferred from Washington
Jimmy Nichols Jr.	55	F	6'8"	225	RS Junior	Conway, South Carolina	Transferred from Providence

=== 2021 recruiting class ===
College recruiting information
Name	Hometown	School	Height	Weight	Commit date
Jalen DeLoach; PF	Savannah, GA	The Skill Factory	6 ft 9 in (2.06 m)	190 lb (86 kg)	Nov 11, 2020
Jalen DeLoach; PF	Recruit ratings: Scout: Rivals: 247Sports: (77)				
Nick Kern Jr. SF	St. Louis, MO	Vashon High School	6 ft 5 in (1.96 m)	180 lb (82 kg)	Nov 11, 2020
Nick Kern Jr. SF	Recruit ratings: Scout: Rivals: 247Sports: (86)				
Jayden Nunn; PG	Flint, MI	Dream City Christian	6 ft 4 in (1.93 m)	190 lb (86 kg)	Apr 18, 2021
Jayden Nunn; PG	Recruit ratings: Scout: Rivals: 247Sports:				
Overall recruit ranking:
Note: In many cases, Scout, Rivals, 247Sports, On3, and ESPN may conflict in their listings of height and weight.; In these cases, the average was taken. ESPN grades are on a 100-point scale.; Sources: "VCU 2021 Player Commits". ESPN.; "2021 Team Ranking". Rivals.

== Preseason ==
=== A-10 media poll ===
The Atlantic 10 men's basketball media poll will be released in October or November 2021.

== Roster ==
2021–22 VCU Rams men's basketball team
Players
Coaches

Pos.	#	Name	Height	Weight	Year	Previous school	Hometown
F	0	Jamir Watkins (injured) (redshirt)	6 ft 7 in (2.01 m)	210 lb (95 kg)	So	Trenton Catholic	Trenton, New Jersey
G	1	Ace Baldwin Jr.	6 ft 1 in (1.85 m)	190 lb (86 kg)	So	St. Frances Academy	Baltimore, Maryland
F	2	Mikeal Brown-Jones	6 ft 8 in (2.03 m)	220 lb (100 kg)	So	IMG Academy	Philadelphia, Pennsylvania
F	4	Jalen DeLoach	6 ft 9 in (2.06 m)	215 lb (98 kg)	Fr	The Skill Factory	Savannah, Georgia
G	5	Marcus Tsohonis	6 ft 3 in (1.91 m)	190 lb (86 kg)	Jr	Washington	Portland, Oregon
F	10	Vince Williams Jr.	6 ft 6 in (1.98 m)	205 lb (93 kg)	Sr	St. John's Jesuit	Toledo, Ohio
G	11	KeShawn Curry	6 ft 4 in (1.93 m)	180 lb (82 kg)	Sr	Fork Union Military Academy	Jacksonville, Florida
G	15	Arnold Henderson VI	5 ft 10 in (1.78 m)	180 lb (82 kg)	Jr	St. Christopher's School	Mechanicsville, Virginia
F	20	Hason Ward	6 ft 9 in (2.06 m)	215 lb (98 kg)	Jr	Springfield Central HS	Saint Thomas, Barbados
G	21	Jarren McAllister (injured)	6 ft 4 in (1.93 m)	205 lb (93 kg)	RS So	Massanutten Military Academy	Wake Forest, North Carolina
G	23	Jayden Nunn	6 ft 4 in (1.93 m)	190 lb (86 kg)	Fr	Dream City Christian	Flint, Michigan
F	24	Nick Kern Jr.	6 ft 6 in (1.98 m)	190 lb (86 kg)	Fr	Vashon HS	St. Louis, Missouri
G	33	Josh Banks	6 ft 5 in (1.96 m)	175 lb (79 kg)	So	Olympic	Charlotte, North Carolina
F	34	Levi Stockard III	6 ft 8 in (2.03 m)	240 lb (109 kg)	GS	Kansas State	St. Louis, Missouri
F	55	Jimmy Nichols Jr.	6 ft 8 in (2.03 m)	225 lb (102 kg)	RS Jr	Providence	Conway, South Carolina

Head coach

- Mike Rhoades (Lebanon Valley)

Assistant coach(es)

- J. D. Byers (Lebanon Valley)
- Brent Scott (Rice)
- Jamal Brunt (Randolph–Macon)

Legend

- (C) Team captain
- (S) Suspended
- (I) Ineligible
- (W) Walk-on
- Injured
- Current redshirt

Roster

== Schedule and results ==
Date time, TV	Rank^{#}	Opponent^{#}	Result	Record	High points	High rebounds	High assists	Site (attendance) city, state
Exhibition
November 1, 2021*; 7:00 p.m.		Virginia State; Exhibition	W 74–55		14 – Tied	9 – Stockard III	6 – Tsohonis	Siegel Center (5,573); Richmond, VA
Non-conference regular season
November 9, 2021*; 6:00 p.m., MASN2/ESPN+		Saint Peter's	W 57–54	1–0	12 – Tied	8 – Ward	4 – Williams Jr.	Siegel Center (7,017); Richmond, VA
November 13, 2021*; 7:00 p.m., MASN2/ESPN+		Wagner	L 44–58	1–1	12 – Curry	6 – Ward	5 – Tsohonis	Siegel Center (7,412); Richmond, VA
November 17, 2021*; 8:00 p.m., SECN+		at Vanderbilt	W 48–37	2–1	14 – Williams Jr.	8 – Ward	3 – Tsohonis	Memorial Gymnasium (5,768); Nashville, TN
November 20, 2021*; 4:00 p.m., MASN/ESPN+		Chattanooga	L 54–56	2–2	21 – Williams Jr.	6 – Williams Jr.	2 – Nunn	Siegel Center (7,202); Richmond, VA
November 24, 2021*; 5:00 p.m., ESPN2		vs. Syracuse; Battle 4 Atlantis Quarterfinals	W 67–55	3–2	15 – Stockard III	5 – Tied	4 – Tied	Imperial Arena (1,281); Paradise Island, BS
November 25, 2021*; 5:00 p.m., ESPN		vs. No. 6 Baylor; Battle 4 Atlantis Semifinals	L 61–69	3–3	17 – Williams Jr.	6 – Tied	5 – Williams Jr.	Imperial Arena (929); Paradise Island, BS
November 26, 2021*; 1:30 p.m., ESPN2		vs. No. 22 UConn; Battle 4 Atlantis 3rd Place Game	L 63–70 ^{OT}	3–4	21 – Nunn	8 – Nunn	2 – Tied	Imperial Arena (673); Paradise Island, BS
December 4, 2021*; 4:00 p.m., MASN/ESPN+		Campbell	W 65–61	4–4	14 – Williams Jr.	8 – Williams Jr.	5 – Williams Jr.	Siegel Center (7,321); Richmond, VA
December 8, 2021*; 7:00 p.m., MASN/ESPN+		Jacksonville State	W 66–52	5–4	20 – Nunn	8 – Stockard III	3 – Williams Jr.	Siegel Center (6,621); Richmond, VA
December 11, 2021*; 8:00 p.m., Stadium		at Old Dominion; ServPro Interstate Rivalry	W 75–66	6–4	16 – Tied	9 – Williams Jr.	5 – Baldwin Jr.	Chartway Arena (7,919); Norfolk, VA
December 15, 2021*; 7:00 p.m., MASN/ESPN+		Florida Atlantic	W 66–46	7–4	13 – Curry	8 – Williams Jr.	9 – Baldwin Jr.	Siegel Center (6,907); Richmond, VA
December 18, 2021*; 3:30 p.m., NBCSN		Penn State	Canceled due to COVID-19 issues					Siegel Center; Richmond, VA
December 22, 2021*; 7:00 p.m., MASN2/ESPN+		New Hampshire	Canceled due to COVID-19 issues					Siegel Center; Richmond, VA
Atlantic 10 regular season
January 5, 2022; 7:00 p.m., CBSSN		at Dayton	W 53–52	8–4 (1–0)	13 – Williams Jr.	11 – Williams Jr.	7 – Baldwin Jr.	UD Arena (13,407); Dayton, OH
January 8, 2022; 2:00 p.m., USA		at La Salle	W 85–66	9–4 (2–0)	17 – Tsohonis	7 – DeLoach	6 – Baldwin Jr.	Tom Gola Arena (1,721); Philadelphia, PA
January 11, 2022; 7:00 p.m., MASN2/ESPN+		George Washington	W 84–57	10–4 (3–0)	16 – Baldwin Jr.	10 – Lindo Jr.	3 – Freeman	Siegel Center (6,327); Richmond, VA
January 14, 2022; 7:30 p.m., ESPN2		at St. Bonaventure	L 53–73	10–5 (3–1)	14 – Tsohonis	4 – Williams Jr.	5 – Baldwin Jr.	Reilly Center (3,512); Olean, NY
January 18, 2022; 7:00 p.m., CBSSN		Davidson; Rescheduled from January 2	L 61–63	10–6 (3–2)	16 – Williams Jr.	7 – Williams Jr.	7 – Baldwin Jr.	Siegel Center (7,091); Richmond, VA
January 22, 2022; 2:30 p.m., USA		Saint Joseph's	W 70–54	11–6 (4–2)	21 – Williams Jr.	7 – Williams Jr.	6 – Baldwin Jr.	Siegel Center (7,391); Richmond, VA
January 26, 2022; 8:30 p.m., CBSSN		at No. 25 Davidson	W 70–68	12–6 (5–2)	16 – Williams Jr.	6 – Williams Jr.	3 – Nunn	John M. Belk Arena (3,575); Davidson, NC
January 29, 2022; 4:00 p.m., CBSSN		at Richmond; Capital City Classic	W 64–62	13–6 (6–2)	22 – Williams Jr.	10 – Ward	8 – Williams Jr.	Robins Center (7,201); Richmond, VA
February 2, 2022; 9:00 p.m., CBSSN		Dayton	L 52–82	13–7 (6–3)	12 – Baldwin Jr.	8 – Ward	4 – Baldwin Jr.	Siegel Center (6,724); Richmond, VA
February 5, 2022; 4:00 p.m., MASN2/ESPN+		Duquesne	W 71–62	14–7 (7–3)	13 – Ward	10 – Ward	7 – Baldwin Jr.	Siegel Center (7,293); Richmond, VA
February 8, 2022; 7:00 p.m., CBSSN		Rhode Island	W 73–64	15–7 (8–3)	28 – Curry	10 – Ward	7 – Williams Jr.	Siegel Center (6,624); Richmond, VA
February 12, 2022; 4:00 p.m., ESPN+		at George Mason; Rivalry	W 85–70	16–7 (9–3)	18 – Baldwin Jr.	6 – Nunn	10 – Baldwin Jr.	EagleBank Arena (6,333); Fairfax, VA
February 15, 2022; 7:00 p.m., ESPN+		at Fordham	W 66–61	17–7 (10–3)	21 – Curry	7 – Williams Jr.	7 – Baldwin Jr.	Rose Hill Gymnasium (876); Bronx, NY
February 18, 2022; 7:00 pm, ESPN2		Richmond; Capital City Classic	W 77–57	18–7 (11–3)	15 – Williams Jr.	7 – Brown-Jones	5 – Baldwin Jr.	Siegel Center (7,637); Richmond, VA
February 23, 2022; 7:00 pm, MASN/CBS6/ESPN+		George Mason; Rivalry/Rescheduled from December 30	W 72–66	19–7 (12–3)	18 – Baldwin Jr.	7 – Baldwin Jr.	4 – Baldwin Jr.	Siegel Center (7,411); Richmond, VA
February 26, 2022; 4:30 p.m., USA		at UMass	W 77–62	20–7 (13–3)	18 – Curry	6 – Ward	9 – Baldwin Jr.	Mullins Center (2,758); Amherst, MA
March 1, 2022; 8:30 p.m., CBSSN		St. Bonaventure	W 74–51	21–7 (14–3)	14 – Curry	7 – Williams Jr.	6 – Williams Jr.	Siegel Center (7,509); Richmond, VA
March 5, 2022; 4:00 p.m., ESPN2		at Saint Louis	L 65–69	21–8 (14–4)	26 – Williams Jr.	6 – Baldwin Jr.	6 – Baldwin Jr.	Chaifetz Arena (9,125); St. Louis, MO
Atlantic 10 tournament
March 11, 2022; 8:30 pm, USA	(3)	vs. (6) Richmond; Quarterfinals/Capital City Classic	L 64–75	21–9	18 – Williams	9 – Williams	7 – Baldwin Jr.	Capital One Arena (7,420); Washington, D.C.
NIT
March 15, 2022; 7:00 pm, ESPNU	(3)	(6) Princeton; First Round – Texas A&M Bracket	W 90–79	22–9	23 – Curry	11 – Williams Jr.	6 – Williams Jr.	Siegel Center (2,743); Richmond, VA
March 19, 2022; 4:00 pm, ESPN+	(3)	at (2) Wake Forest; Second Round – Texas A&M Bracket	L 74–80	22–10	27 – Williams Jr.	8 – 2 tied	4 – Baldwin Jr.	LJVM Coliseum (4,341); Winston-Salem, NC
*Non-conference game. ^{#}Rankings from AP Poll. (#) Tournament seedings in parentheses. All times are in Eastern Time.
