= List of 2022–23 NBA season transactions =

This is a list of transactions that have taken place during the 2022 NBA off-season and the 2022–23 NBA season.

== Retirement ==
Date	Name	Team(s) played (years)	Age	Notes	Ref.
June 24	Phil Pressey	Boston Celtics (2013–2015); Philadelphia 76ers (2015); Phoenix Suns (2016)	32	Also played in the NBA D-League and abroad. Hired as a graduate assistant by the Missouri Tigers.	
July 20	J. J. Barea	Dallas Mavericks (2006–2011; 2014–2020); Minnesota Timberwolves (2011–2014)	38	NBA champion (2011); J. Walter Kennedy Citizenship Award (2018); Also played in the NBA D-League and abroad.	
August 16	D. J. White	Oklahoma City Thunder (2008–2011); Charlotte Bobcats (2011–2012; 2014); Boston Celtics (2013)	35	Also played in the NBA D-League and abroad.	
August 20	Gustavo Ayón	New Orleans Hornets (2011–2012); Orlando Magic (2012–2013); Milwaukee Bucks (2013); Atlanta Hawks (2013–2014)	37	Also played abroad.	
August 23	Cameron Bairstow	Chicago Bulls (2014–2016)	31	Also played in the NBA D-League and abroad.	
September 3	Jodie Meeks	Milwaukee Bucks (2009–2010); Philadelphia 76ers (2010–2012); Los Angeles Lakers (2012–2014); Detroit Pistons (2014–2016); Orlando Magic (2016–2017); Washington Wizards (2017–2018); Toronto Raptors (2019)	35	NBA champion (2019); Also played in the NBA G League.	
September 6	Toure' Murry	New York Knicks (2013–2014); Utah Jazz (2014–2015); Washington Wizards (2015)	32	Also played in the NBA D-League and abroad.	
October 1	Reggie Hearn	Detroit Pistons (2018)	31	Also played in the NBA D-League and G League. Hired as a scout by the San Antonio Spurs.	
October 3	Jason Thompson	Sacramento Kings (2008–2015); Golden State Warriors (2015–2016); Toronto Raptors (2016)	36	Also played in the NBA G League and abroad. Hired as a special assistant to the head coach by the Rider Broncs.	
October 21	Quincy Acy	Toronto Raptors (2012–2013); Sacramento Kings (2013–2014; 2015–2016); New York Knicks (2014–2015); Dallas Mavericks (2016); Brooklyn Nets (2017–2018); Phoenix Suns (2019)	32	Also played in the NBA D-League/ G League and abroad. Hired as a player development coach by the Texas Legends.	
October 26	Gal Mekel	Dallas Mavericks (2013–2014); New Orleans Pelicans (2014)	34	Also played in the NBA D-League and abroad.	
November 29	Chandler Hutchison	Chicago Bulls (2018–2021); Washington Wizards (2021); Phoenix Suns (2021–2022)	26	Also played in the NBA G League.	
December 15	Tyrell Terry	Dallas Mavericks (2020–2021); Memphis Grizzlies (2021–2022)	22	Also played in the NBA G League.	
December 24	Jon Teske	Memphis Grizzlies (2022)	25	Also played in the NBA G League.	
March 31	LaMarcus Aldridge	Portland Trail Blazers (2006–2015); San Antonio Spurs (2015–2021); Brooklyn Nets (2021–2022)	37	NBA All-Star (2012–2016, 2018, 2019); All-NBA Second Team (2015, 2018); All-NBA Third Team (2011, 2014, 2016); NBA All-Rookie First Team (2007)	
April 8	Esteban Batista	Atlanta Hawks (2005–2007)	39	Also played in the NBA D-League and abroad. First Uruguayan to play in the NBA.	
May 4	Keith Langford	San Antonio Spurs (2007)	38	Also played in the NBA D-League, the USBL and abroad.	
May 22	Carmelo Anthony	Denver Nuggets (2003–2011); New York Knicks (2011–2017); Oklahoma City Thunder (2017–2018); Houston Rockets (2018–2019); Portland Trail Blazers (2019–2021); Los Angeles Lakers (2021–2022)	38	NBA All-Star (2007, 2008, 2010–2017); All-NBA Second Team (2010, 2013); All-NBA Third Team (2006, 2007, 2009, 2012); NBA scoring champion (2013); NBA All-Rookie First Team (2003); NBA 75th Anniversary Team; NBA Social Justice Champion Award (2021)	
June 2	Shayne Whittington	Indiana Pacers (2014–2016)	32	Also played in the NBA D-League and abroad. Hired as an assistant coach for the Indiana Pacers.	
June 9	Eugene Jeter	Sacramento Kings (2010–2011)	39	Also played in the NBA D-League, NBA G League and abroad. Hired as a player development coach by the Portland Trail Blazers and as an assistant GM for the Rip City Remix.	
June 9	Marcus Paige	Charlotte Hornets (2017–2018)	29	Also played in the NBA G League and abroad. Hired as a Director of Team and Player Development by the North Carolina Tar Heels.	

== Front office movements ==
=== Head coaching changes ===
Off-season

Departure date	Team	Outgoing head coach	Reason for departure	Hire date	Incoming head coach	Last coaching position	Ref.
April 11	Los Angeles Lakers	Frank Vogel	Fired	June 3	Darvin Ham	Milwaukee Bucks assistant coach (2018–2022)	
April 11	Sacramento Kings	Alvin Gentry	Fired	May 9	Mike Brown	Golden State Warriors associate head coach (2016–2022)	
April 22	Charlotte Hornets	James Borrego	Fired	June 24	Steve Clifford	Orlando Magic head coach (2018–2021)	
June 5	Utah Jazz	Quin Snyder	Resigned	June 29	Will Hardy	Boston Celtics assistant coach (2021–2022)	
September 22	Boston Celtics	Ime Udoka	Suspended	September 22	Joe Mazzulla	Boston Celtics assistant coach (2019–2022)	

In-Season

Departure date	Team	Outgoing head coach	Reason for departure	Hire date	Incoming head coach	Last coaching position	Ref.
November 1	Brooklyn Nets	Steve Nash	Mutually agreed to part ways	November 9	Jacque Vaughn	Brooklyn Nets assistant coach (2016–2022); interim coach (2020)	
February 21	Atlanta Hawks	Nate McMillan	Fired	February 26	Quin Snyder	Utah Jazz head coach (2014–2022)	

== Player movements ==
=== Trades ===
June
June 23 (pre-draft)	To Cleveland Cavaliers: 2022 No. 49 pick	To Sacramento Kings: Draft rights to Sasha Vezenkov (2017 No. 57); Cash considerations	
June 23 (pre-draft)	To Los Angeles Lakers: 2022 No. 35 pick	To Orlando Magic: 2028 second-round pick (Note: The more favorable of the picks originally belonging to either Washington or the Lakers.); Cash considerations	
June 23 (draft night)	To Denver Nuggets: Draft rights to Peyton Watson (No. 30); 2023 second-round pick (Note: The second best of the picks originally belonging to Oklahoma City, Washington, and Dallas/Miami (more favorable of the two).); 2024 second-round pick (Note: The more favorable of the picks originally belonging to Charlotte and Minnesota.)	To Oklahoma City Thunder: JaMychal Green; 2027 DEN protected first-round pick (Note: At least two years after Denver conveys its pick to Orlando, it will convey this pick to Oklahoma City. The earliest possible date is 2027 (if No. 6–30), rolling over to 2028 and 2029 with same protection; if not conveyed by 2029, it will convert to Denver's 2029 second-round pick.)	
June 23 (draft night)	To Charlotte Hornets: 2023 DEN first-round pick (Note: Charlotte will receive the pick if it is No. 15–30, rolling over with the same protection through 2025; if not conveyed by 2025, it will convert to Denver's 2025 and 2026 second-round picks.); 2023 NYK second-round pick; 2023 UTA second-round pick; 2023 second-round pick (Note: The least favorable of the picks originally belonging to Oklahoma City, Washington, and Dallas/Miami (more favorable of the two).); 2024 NYK second-round pick	To New York Knicks: Draft rights to Jalen Duren (No. 13) (Note: New York later traded his rights to Detroit.)	(Note: This was originally announced as part of a three-team trade also involving Detroit, to be finalized later but still official. The Detroit-New York portion of the trade was announced on July 6, when Duren's rights were included in the Kemba Walker trade. The Charlotte-New York portion has not appeared on the NBA Transactions page and Draft Trade Tracker portion has not been updated. The trade is listed here because New York didn't own the 2023 Denver pick until its trade with Oklahoma City became official on June 24.)
June 23 (draft night)	To New York Knicks: 2023 DEN protected first-round pick (Note: New York will receive the pick if it is No. 15–30, rolling over with the same protection through 2025; if not conveyed by 2025, it will convert to Denver's 2025 and 2026 second-round picks. New York traded this pick to Charlotte.); 2023 DET protected first-round pick (Note: New York will receive the pick if it is No. 19–30, rolling over to 2024 with the same protection, 2025 (No. 14–30), 2026 (No. 12–30), 2027 (No. 10–30); if not conveyed by 2027, it will convert to Detroit's 2027 second-round pick.); 2023 WAS protected first-round pick (Note: New York will receive the pick if it is No. 15–30, rolling over to 2024 (No. 13–30), 2025 (No. 11–30), 2026 (No. 9–30); if not conveyed by 2026, it will convert to Washington's 2026 and 2027 second-round picks.)	To Oklahoma City Thunder: Draft rights to Ousmane Dieng (No. 11)	
June 24	To Memphis Grizzlies: Danny Green; Draft rights to David Roddy (No. 23)	To Philadelphia 76ers: De'Anthony Melton	
June 24	To Memphis Grizzlies: Draft rights to Jake LaRavia (No. 19); 2023 MIN second-round pick	To Minnesota Timberwolves: Draft rights to Walker Kessler (No. 22) (Note: Minnesota later traded his rights to Utah.); Draft rights to TyTy Washington (No. 29) (Note: Minnesota traded his rights to Houston.)	
June 24	To Dallas Mavericks: Christian Wood	To Houston Rockets: Sterling Brown; Trey Burke; Marquese Chriss; Boban Marjanović; Draft rights to Wendell Moore Jr. (No. 26) (Note: Houston traded his rights to Minnesota.)	
June 24	To Houston Rockets: Draft rights to TyTy Washington Jr. (No. 29); 2025 MIN second-round pick; 2027 MIN second-round pick	To Minnesota Timberwolves: Draft rights to Wendell Moore Jr. (No. 26)	
June 24	To Indiana Pacers: Draft rights to Kendall Brown (No. 48)	To Minnesota Timberwolves: 2026 second-round pick (Note: The least favorable of the picks originally belonging to Indiana, Miami, and San Antonio.); Cash considerations	
June 24	To Indiana Pacers: Cash considerations	To Milwaukee Bucks: Draft rights to Hugo Besson (No. 58)	
June 24	To Charlotte Hornets: Draft rights to Bryce McGowens (No. 40)	To Minnesota Timberwolves: Draft rights to Josh Minott (No. 45); 2023 NYK second-round pick	
June 24	To Dallas Mavericks: Draft rights to Jaden Hardy (No. 37) (Note: Dallas' tweet states they acquired Hardy's rights; Sacramento's press release states that they traded the pick.)	To Sacramento Kings: 2024 DAL second-round pick; 2028 DAL second-round pick	
June 24	To Atlanta Hawks: Draft rights to Tyrese Martin (No. 51); Cash considerations	To Golden State Warriors: Draft rights to Ryan Rollins (No. 44)	
June 24	To Memphis Grizzlies: Draft rights to Kennedy Chandler (No. 38)	To San Antonio Spurs: 2024 LAL second-round pick; Cash considerations	
June 30	To Atlanta Hawks: Dejounte Murray; Jock Landale (Note: Atlanta later traded Landale to Phoenix)	To San Antonio Spurs: Danilo Gallinari; 2023 CHA protected first-round pick (Note: San Antonio will receive the pick if it is No. 17–30, rolling over to 2024 (No. 15–30) and 2025 (No. 15–30); if the pick is not conveyed by 2025, it will convert to Charlotte's 2026 and 2027 second-round picks.); 2025 ATL first-round pick; 2026 right to swap first-round picks; 2027 ATL first-round pick	
June 30	To Brooklyn Nets: Royce O'Neale	To Utah Jazz: 2023 first-round pick (Note: Brooklyn has the right to swap its pick for Houston's; after that, Utah will receive the less favorable of Philadelphia's pick and whichever of the Brooklyn and Houston picks the Nets chose to retain.)	
July
July 6	To Atlanta Hawks: Maurice Harkless; Justin Holiday; 2024 SAC protected first-round pick (Note: Atlanta will receive the pick if it is No. 15–30, rolling over to 2025 (No. 13–30) and 2026 (No. 11–30); if the pick is not conveyed by 2026, it will convert to Sacramento's 2026 and 2027 second-round picks)	To Sacramento Kings: Kevin Huerter	
July 6	To Atlanta Hawks: Cash considerations	To Phoenix Suns: Jock Landale	
July 6	To Denver Nuggets: Kentavious Caldwell-Pope; Ish Smith	To Washington Wizards: Will Barton; Monté Morris	
July 6	To Detroit Pistons: Draft rights to Gabriele Procida (No. 36); 2025 MIL protected first-round pick (Note: Detroit traded this pick to New York the same day.); 2025 DET second-round pick (Note: Detroit traded this pick away in 2020.); 2026 second-round pick (Note: The more favorable of the picks originally belonging to New Orleans and Portland.)	To Portland Trail Blazers: Jerami Grant; Draft rights to Ismaël Kamagate (No. 46) (Note: Detroit drafted Kamagate and traded his rights to Portland that night; the NBA.com Draft Trade Tracker initially listed the trade as official but part of a larger trade to be finalized later. Portland then traded Kamagate's rights to the Denver Nuggets without official announcement, and Denver included him in a press release about their draft acquisitions five days after the draft, giving the impression the trade was official. Denver signed two of their draft acquisitions on July 3 but Kamagate was not one of them.)	
July 6	To Detroit Pistons: Kemba Walker; Draft rights to Jalen Duren (No. 13)	To New York Knicks: 2025 MIL protected first-round pick (Note: New York will receive the pick if it is No. 5–30, otherwise they receive nothing.)	
July 6	To Denver Nuggets: Draft rights to Ismaël Kamagate (No. 46)	To Portland Trail Blazers: 2024 second-round pick (Note: The more favorable of the picks originally belonging to Charlotte and Minnesota.)	
July 6	To Minnesota Timberwolves: Rudy Gobert	To Utah Jazz: Malik Beasley; Patrick Beverley; Leandro Bolmaro; Jarred Vanderbilt; Draft rights to Walker Kessler (No. 22); 2023 MIN first-round pick; 2025 MIN first-round pick; 2026 right to swap first-round picks (Note: Utah may still owe a protected first-round pick to Oklahoma City in 2026, in which case Utah will only have its pick available to swap if it is No. 1–8.); 2027 MIN first-round pick; 2029 MIN first-round pick (Note: Utah will receive the pick if it is No. 6–30, otherwise they receive Minnesota's 2029 second-round pick.)	
July 9	To Boston Celtics: Malcolm Brogdon	To Indiana Pacers: Malik Fitts; Juwan Morgan; Aaron Nesmith; Nik Stauskas; Daniel Theis; 2023 BOS protected first-round pick (Note: Indiana will receive the pick if it is No. 13–30, otherwise it will convert to the least favorable of the 2023 second-round picks originally belonging to Dallas, Houston, and Miami.)	
July 11	To Detroit Pistons: Alec Burks; Nerlens Noel; 2023 DET second-round draft pick (Note: This is the second trade this offseason in which Detroit has reacquired one of its own picks that it previously traded away.); 2026 second-round draft pick (Note: The more favorable of the picks originally belonging to Minnesota and New York.); Cash considerations	To New York Knicks: Draft rights to Nikola Radičević (2015 No. 57); 2025 DET protected second-round pick (Note: New York will receive the pick if it is No. 56–60, otherwise they receive nothing.)	
August
August 25	To Los Angeles Lakers: Patrick Beverley	To Utah Jazz: Talen Horton-Tucker; Stanley Johnson	
September
September 3	To Cleveland Cavaliers: Donovan Mitchell	To Utah Jazz: Ochai Agbaji; Lauri Markkanen; Collin Sexton (sign-and-trade); 2025 CLE first-round pick; 2026 right to swap first-round picks; 2027 CLE first-round pick; 2028 right to swap first-round picks; 2029 CLE first-round pick	
September 22	To Detroit Pistons: Bojan Bogdanović	To Utah Jazz: Saben Lee; Kelly Olynyk	
September 27	To Atlanta Hawks: Vít Krejčí	To Oklahoma City Thunder: Maurice Harkless; 2025 ATL second-round pick protection reduced (Note: Oklahoma City will now receive the pick if it is No. 41–60, otherwise they receive nothing; previously the range was more restricted.); 2029 ATL second-round pick	
September 30	To Houston Rockets: Derrick Favors; Maurice Harkless; Ty Jerome; Théo Maledon; 2026 second-round pick (Note: The second best of the picks originally belonging to Dallas, Oklahoma City, and Philadelphia.); Cash considerations	To Oklahoma City Thunder: Sterling Brown; Trey Burke; Marquese Chriss; David Nwaba	
January
January 5	To Boston Celtics: 2024 SAS protected second-round pick (Note: Boston will receive the pick if it is No. 56–60.)	To San Antonio Spurs: Noah Vonleh; Cash considerations	
January 23	To Los Angeles Lakers: Rui Hachimura	To Washington Wizards: Kendrick Nunn; 2023 CHI second-round pick; 2028 second-round pick (Note: The less favorable of the picks originally belonging to the Lakers and Wizards. Washington traded its 2028 pick to the Lakers in 2021. The Lakers traded the more favorable of their pick and Washington's to Orlando before the 2022 draft and then the Lakers traded the remaining pick to Washington in this trade. It's a pick swap without technically being a pick swap.); 2029 LAL second-round pick	
February
February 6	To Brooklyn Nets: Spencer Dinwiddie; Dorian Finney-Smith; 2027 DAL second-round pick; 2029 DAL first-round pick; 2029 DAL second-round pick	To Dallas Mavericks: Kyrie Irving; Markieff Morris	
February 7	To Brooklyn Nets: Draft rights to David Michineau (2016 No. 39)	To Sacramento Kings: Kessler Edwards; Cash considerations	
February 7	To Miami Heat: Cash considerations	To San Antonio Spurs: Dewayne Dedmon; 2028 MIA second-round pick	
February 9	To Atlanta Hawks: Bruno Fernando; Garrison Mathews	To Houston Rockets: Justin Holiday; Frank Kaminsky; 2024 OKC second-round pick; 2025 OKC second-round pick	
February 9	To Boston Celtics: Mike Muscala	To Oklahoma City Thunder: Justin Jackson; 2023 second-round pick (Note: If the Rockets' second-round pick lands is No. 31–32, the Thunder will receive the least favorable of the picks originally belonging to Dallas, Miami, and Portland. If the Rockets' pick is No. 33–60, Oklahoma City will receive the less favorable of the picks originally belonging to Houston and Portland.); 2029 BOS second-round pick	
February 9	To Charlotte Hornets: Reggie Jackson; 2028 LAC second-round pick; Cash considerations	To Los Angeles Clippers: Mason Plumlee	
February 9	To New Orleans Pelicans: Josh Richardson	To San Antonio Spurs: Devonte' Graham; 2024 second-round pick (Note: The more favorable of the picks originally belonging to Chicago and New Orleans.); 2026 second-round pick (Note: The less favorable of the picks originally belonging to New Orleans and Portland.); 2028 NOP second-round pick; 2029 NOP second-round pick	
February 9	To Oklahoma City Thunder: Dario Šarić; 2029 PHX second-round pick; Cash considerations	To Phoenix Suns: Darius Bazley	
February 9	To San Antonio Spurs: Khem Birch; 2023 TOR second-round pick; 2024 TOR protected first-round pick (Note: San Antonio will receive the pick if it is No. 7–30; no further information.); 2025 TOR second-round pick	To Toronto Raptors: Jakob Poeltl	
February 9	Three-team trade		
February 9	To Houston Rockets: Danny Green (from Memphis); John Wall (from Los Angeles); 2023 right to swap first-round picks (Note: Houston may swap Milwaukee's pick for the less favorable of the picks originally belonging to the Clippers and Oklahoma City, subject to top-six protection.) (from Los Angeles)	To Los Angeles Clippers: Eric Gordon (from Houston); 2024 second-round pick (Note: The Clippers will receive the less favorable of the picks originally belonging to Cleveland and Utah or Indiana's pick, whichever is more favorable.) (from Memphis); 2024 TOR second-round pick (from Memphis); 2027 MEM second-round pick (from Memphis)	
February 9	To Memphis Grizzlies: Luke Kennard (from Los Angeles); 2026 Right to swap second-round picks (Note: Memphis may swap the most favorable of the picks originally belonging to Boston, Indiana, and Miami for the Clippers' pick.) (from Los Angeles)		
February 9	Three-team trade		
February 9	To Los Angeles Lakers: Malik Beasley (from Utah); D'Angelo Russell (from Minnesota); Jarred Vanderbilt (from Utah)	To Minnesota Timberwolves: Nickeil Alexander-Walker (from Utah); Mike Conley (from Utah); 2024 second-round pick (Note: The less favorable of the picks originally belonging to Memphis and Washington.) (from Los Angeles); 2025 UTA second-round pick (from Utah); 2026 UTA second-round pick (from Utah)	
February 9	To Utah Jazz: Damian Jones (from Los Angeles); Juan Toscano-Anderson (from Los Angeles); Russell Westbrook (from Los Angeles); 2027 LAL protected first-round pick (Note: Utah will receive the pick if it is No. 5–30, otherwise they receive the Lakers' 2027 second-round pick.) (from Los Angeles)		
February 9	Four-team trade		
February 9	To Atlanta Hawks: Saddiq Bey (from Detroit)	To Detroit Pistons: James Wiseman (from Golden State)	
February 9	To Golden State Warriors: Gary Payton II (from Portland); 2026 ATL second-round pick (from Atlanta); 2028 ATL second-round pick (from Atlanta)	To Portland Trail Blazers: Kevin Knox II (from Detroit); 2023 second-round pick (Note: The second best of the picks originally belonging to Atlanta, Brooklyn, and Charlotte.) (from Atlanta); 2024 ATL second-round pick protections removed (Note: Portland previously would have received the pick if it was No. 56–60, now they will receive it regardless of position.) (from Atlanta); 2025 ATL protected second-round pick (Note: Portland will receive the pick if it is No. 31–40.) (from Atlanta); 2026 MEM protected second-round pick (Note: Portland will receive the pick if it is No. 43–60.) (from Golden State); 2028 GSW second-round pick (from Golden State)	
February 9	Four-team trade		
February 9	To Brooklyn Nets: Mikal Bridges (from Phoenix); Cameron Johnson (from Phoenix); Draft rights to Juan Pablo Vaulet (2015 No. 39) (from Indiana); 2023 PHX first-round pick (from Phoenix); 2025 PHX first-round pick (from Phoenix); 2027 PHX first-round pick (from Phoenix); 2028 right to swap first-round picks (from Phoenix); 2028 MIL second-round pick (from Milwaukee); 2029 PHX first-round pick (from Phoenix); 2029 second-round pick (from Milwaukee)	To Indiana Pacers: George Hill (from Milwaukee); Serge Ibaka (from Milwaukee); Jordan Nwora (from Milwaukee); 2023 second-round pick (Note: Indiana will receive either the less favorable of the picks originally belonging to Cleveland and Golden State or Milwaukee's pick, whichever is more favorable.) (from Milwaukee); 2024 MIL second-round pick (from Milwaukee); 2025 IND second-round pick (Note: Milwaukee acquired this pick in an earlier trade.) (from Milwaukee); Cash considerations (from Brooklyn)	
February 9	To Milwaukee Bucks: Jae Crowder (from Phoenix)	To Phoenix Suns: Kevin Durant (from Brooklyn); T. J. Warren (from Brooklyn)	
February 9	Four-team trade		
February 9	To Charlotte Hornets: Sviatoslav Mykhailiuk (from New York); 2023 second-round pick (Note: The most favorable of the picks originally belonging to Atlanta, Brooklyn, and Charlotte. Philadelphia owned Charlotte's 2023 pick from an earlier trade.) (from Philadelphia); 2027 second-round pick (Note: The more favorable of the picks originally belonging to New Orleans and Portland.) (from Portland)	To New York Knicks: Josh Hart (from Portland); Draft rights to Dani Díez (2015 No. 54) (from Portland); Draft rights to Bojan Dubljević (2013 No. 59) (from Portland)	
February 9	To Philadelphia 76ers: Jalen McDaniels (from Charlotte); 2024 NYK second-round pick (from Charlotte); 2029 POR second-round pick (from Portland)	To Portland Trail Blazers: Ryan Arcidiacono (from New York); Cam Reddish (from New York); Matisse Thybulle (from Philadelphia); Draft rights to Ante Tomić (2008 No. 44); 2023 NYK protected first-round pick (Note: Portland will receive the pick if it is No. 15–30; no further details available.) (from New York)	
February 9	Four-team trade		
February 9	To Denver Nuggets: Thomas Bryant (from Lakers)	To Los Angeles Clippers: Bones Hyland (from Denver)	
February 9	To Los Angeles Lakers: Mo Bamba (from Orlando); Davon Reed (from Denver); 2024 LAC second-round pick (from Clippers); 2025 LAC second-round pick (from Clippers)	To Orlando Magic: Patrick Beverley (from Lakers); 2024 DEN second-round pick (from Denver); Cash considerations (from Lakers)	

=== Free agents ===
The NBA's free agency period began on June 30 at 6 p.m. EST.

Players were allowed to sign new offers starting on July 6 at 12 p.m. ET, after the moratorium ended.

^{®}	Denotes unsigned players whose free-agent rights were renounced
	Denotes sign and trade players
	Denotes player who is signed after buyout
	Denotes signed player who failed to make opening day roster
	Denotes player whose deal was later turned into a two-way contract
	Denotes player signed to 10-day contract
	Denotes restricted free agent whose offer sheet was matched by his old team

Player	Date signed	New team	Former team	Ref
Troy Brown Jr.	July 1	Los Angeles Lakers	Chicago Bulls	
Anthony Gill (RFA)	July 1	Washington Wizards		
Damian Jones	July 1	Los Angeles Lakers	Sacramento Kings	
Damion Lee	July 1	Phoenix Suns	Golden State Warriors	
Trevelin Queen	July 1	Philadelphia 76ers	Houston Rockets	
Juan Toscano-Anderson	July 1	Los Angeles Lakers	Golden State Warriors	
Josh Okogie	July 2	Phoenix Suns	Minnesota Timberwolves	
Bismack Biyombo	July 3	Phoenix Suns		
Isaiah Roby	July 5	San Antonio Spurs (Claimed off waivers)	Oklahoma City Thunder (Waived on July 3)	
Marvin Bagley III (RFA)	July 6	Detroit Pistons		
Nicolas Batum*	July 6	Los Angeles Clippers		
Bradley Beal*	July 6	Washington Wizards		
Thomas Bryant	July 6	Los Angeles Lakers	Washington Wizards	
Jevon Carter	July 6	Milwaukee Bucks		
Amir Coffey (RFA)	July 6	Los Angeles Clippers		
Dewayne Dedmon	July 6	Miami Heat		
Luguentz Dort** (RFA)	July 6	Oklahoma City Thunder		
Andre Drummond	July 6	Chicago Bulls	Brooklyn Nets	
Kessler Edwards	July 6	Brooklyn Nets		
Aaron Holiday	July 6	Atlanta Hawks	Phoenix Suns	
Danuel House	July 6	Philadelphia 76ers	Utah Jazz	
Joe Ingles	July 6	Milwaukee Bucks	Portland Trail Blazers	
Derrick Jones Jr.	July 6	Chicago Bulls		
Tyus Jones	July 6	Memphis Grizzlies		
Caleb Martin (RFA)	July 6	Miami Heat		
Cody Martin (RFA)	July 6	Charlotte Hornets		
Wesley Matthews	July 6	Milwaukee Bucks		
Malik Monk	July 6	Sacramento Kings	Los Angeles Lakers	
Jusuf Nurkić	July 6	Portland Trail Blazers		
Victor Oladipo	July 6	Miami Heat		
Gary Payton II	July 6	Portland Trail Blazers	Golden State Warriors	
Theo Pinson (RFA)	July 6	Dallas Mavericks		
Otto Porter Jr.	July 6	Toronto Raptors	Golden State Warriors	
Bobby Portis*	July 6	Milwaukee Bucks		
Orlando Robinson	July 6	Miami Heat	Fresno State (Undrafted in 2022)	
Anfernee Simons (RFA)	July 6	Portland Trail Blazers		
Jalen Smith	July 6	Indiana Pacers		
Jae'Sean Tate** (RFA)	July 6	Houston Rockets		
P. J. Tucker	July 6	Philadelphia 76ers	Miami Heat	
Lonnie Walker IV	July 6	Los Angeles Lakers	San Antonio Spurs	
Delon Wright	July 6	Washington Wizards	Atlanta Hawks	
Kyle Anderson	July 7	Minnesota Timberwolves	Memphis Grizzlies	
Mo Bamba	July 7	Orlando Magic		
Bol Bol	July 7	Orlando Magic		
Chris Boucher	July 7	Toronto Raptors		
Bruce Brown	July 7	Denver Nuggets	Brooklyn Nets	
Vlatko Čančar (RFA)	July 7	Denver Nuggets		
Nic Claxton (RFA)	July 7	Brooklyn Nets		
Drew Eubanks	July 7	Portland Trail Blazers		
Javon Freeman-Liberty	July 7	Chicago Bulls	DePaul (Undrafted in 2022)	
Zach LaVine	July 7	Chicago Bulls		
Robin Lopez	July 7	Cleveland Cavaliers	Orlando Magic	
Raul Neto	July 7	Cleveland Cavaliers	Washington Wizards	
Ricky Rubio	July 7	Cleveland Cavaliers	Indiana Pacers	
Rayjon Tucker	July 7	Milwaukee Bucks (Waived on July 5)		
Luca Vildoza	July 7	Milwaukee Bucks (Waived on July 5)		
T. J. Warren	July 7	Brooklyn Nets	Indiana Pacers	
D. J. Wilson	July 7	Toronto Raptors	Oklahoma City Blue (G League)	
Donte DiVincenzo	July 8	Golden State Warriors	Sacramento Kings	
Xavier Moon	July 8	Los Angeles Clippers (Previously on a two-way contract)		
Jay Scrubb	July 8	Los Angeles Clippers (Previously on a two-way contract)		
Edmond Sumner	July 8	Brooklyn Nets (Waived on October 10, 2021)		
John Wall	July 8	Los Angeles Clippers	Houston Rockets (Waived on June 28)	
Lindell Wigginton	July 8	Milwaukee Bucks (Previously on a two-way contract)		
Adonis Arms	July 9	Denver Nuggets	Texas Tech (Undrafted in 2022)	
Moses Brown	July 9	Los Angeles Clippers	Cleveland Cavaliers	
Kellan Grady	July 9	Denver Nuggets	Kentucky (Undrafted in 2022)	
Sam Hauser** (RFA)	July 9	Boston Celtics		
Luke Kornet	July 9	Boston Celtics		
Kevon Looney	July 9	Golden State Warriors		
JaVale McGee	July 9	Dallas Mavericks	Phoenix Suns	
Davon Reed (RFA)	July 9	Denver Nuggets		
Jericho Sims (RFA)	July 9	New York Knicks (Previously on a two-way contract)		
Michael Foster Jr.	July 10	Philadelphia 76ers	NBA G League Ignite (G League / Undrafted in 2022)	
Patty Mills*	July 10	Brooklyn Nets		
Bryn Forbes	July 11	Minnesota Timberwolves	Denver Nuggets	
DeAndre Jordan	July 11	Denver Nuggets	Philadelphia 76ers	
Frank Kaminsky	July 11	Atlanta Hawks	Phoenix Suns	
Jalen Brunson	July 12	New York Knicks	Dallas Mavericks	
Danilo Gallinari	July 12	Boston Celtics	San Antonio Spurs (Waived on July 8)	
Isaiah Hartenstein	July 12	New York Knicks	Los Angeles Clippers	
Mitchell Robinson	July 12	New York Knicks		
Jamaree Bouyea	July 13	Miami Heat	San Francisco (Undrafted in 2022)	
Justin Champagnie (RFA)	July 13	Toronto Raptors (Previously on a two-way contract)		
Jamal Cain	July 15	Miami Heat	Oakland (Undrafted in 2022)	
Deandre Ayton (RFA)	July 18	Phoenix Suns		
Chima Moneke	July 18	Sacramento Kings	Baxi Manresa (Spain)	
Taj Gibson	July 19	Washington Wizards	New York Knicks (Waived on July 8)	
Serge Ibaka	July 19	Milwaukee Bucks		
Austin Rivers	July 19	Minnesota Timberwolves	Denver Nuggets	
Mac McClung	July 22	Golden State Warriors	Los Angeles Lakers (Previously on a two-way contract)	
Trevion Williams	July 22	Golden State Warriors	Purdue (Undrafted in 2022)	
Nathan Knight (RFA)	July 23	Minnesota Timberwolves (Previously on a two-way contract)		
Pat Spencer	July 23	Golden State Warriors	Capital City Go-Go (G League)	
Fabian White Jr.	July 23	Los Angeles Lakers	Houston (Undrafted in 2022)	
Javante McCoy	July 24	Los Angeles Lakers	Boston University (Undrafted in 2022)	
Bruno Fernando	July 26	Houston Rockets		
Simone Fontecchio	July 27	Utah Jazz	Cazoo Baskonia (Spain)	
James Harden*	July 27	Philadelphia 76ers		
Juancho Hernangómez	July 27	Toronto Raptors	Utah Jazz (Waived on June 30)	
Jay Huff	July 27	Los Angeles Lakers	South Bay Lakers (G League)	
Matthew Dellavedova	July 29	Sacramento Kings	Melbourne United (Australia)	
JaMychal Green	August 1	Golden State Warriors	Oklahoma City Thunder (Waived on July 20)	
Kevin Knox II	August 1	Detroit Pistons	Atlanta Hawks	
Rodney McGruder	August 1	Detroit Pistons		
Gabe Brown	August 2	Toronto Raptors	Michigan State (Undrafted in 2022)	
Goran Dragić	August 2	Chicago Bulls	Brooklyn Nets	
Jared Rhoden	August 2	Portland Trail Blazers	Seton Hall (Undrafted in 2022)	
Isaiah Miller	August 3	Portland Trail Blazers	Iowa Wolves (G League)	
Mike Muscala**	August 3	Oklahoma City Thunder		
Norvel Pelle	August 3	Portland Trail Blazers	Cleveland Charge (G League)	
Gorgui Dieng	August 9	San Antonio Spurs	Atlanta Hawks	
C. J. Elleby	August 9	Minnesota Timberwolves	Portland Trail Blazers	
Makur Maker	August 9	Washington Wizards	Sydney Kings (Australia / Undrafted in 2022)	
Mouhamadou Gueye	August 12	Dallas Mavericks	Pittsburgh (Undrafted in 2022)	
Sam Merrill	August 12	Sacramento Kings	Memphis Grizzlies	
McKinley Wright IV	August 12	Dallas Mavericks	Minnesota Timberwolves (Previously on a two-way contract)	
Tyler Hall	August 15	Dallas Mavericks	Westchester Knicks (G League)	
Carlik Jones	August 15	Chicago Bulls	Texas Legends (G League)	
Deividas Sirvydis	August 18	Indiana Pacers	Motor City Cruise (G League)	
Tyson Etienne	August 22	Atlanta Hawks	Wichita State (Undrafted in 2022)	
Luka Garza	August 22	Minnesota Timberwolves	Detroit Pistons	
Udonis Haslem	August 23	Miami Heat		
Bruno Caboclo	August 24	Boston Celtics	São Paulo FC (Brazil)	
Joe Wieskamp (RFA)	August 24	San Antonio Spurs		
Chris Silva	August 25	Atlanta Hawks	Iowa Wolves (G League)	
Justin Tillman	August 25	Denver Nuggets	Gigantes de Carolina (Puerto Rico)	
Alize Johnson	August 26	San Antonio Spurs	New Orleans Pelicans	
Tommy Kuhse	August 26	San Antonio Spurs	Saint Mary's (Undrafted in 2022)	
Yuta Watanabe	August 28	Brooklyn Nets	Toronto Raptors	
Josh Jackson	August 30	Toronto Raptors	Sacramento Kings	
Collin Sexton (RFA)	September 3	Utah Jazz	Cleveland Cavaliers	
Devontae Cacok	September 7	Portland Trail Blazers	San Antonio Spurs	
Markieff Morris	September 7	Brooklyn Nets	Miami Heat	
Jerome Robinson	September 7	Golden State Warriors	Santa Cruz Warriors (G League)	
Olivier Sarr	September 7	Portland Trail Blazers	Oklahoma City Thunder	
Noah Vonleh	September 7	Boston Celtics	Shanghai Sharks (China)	
Jamorko Pickett^{®}	September 8	Cleveland Cavaliers	Detroit Pistons (Previously on a two-way contract)	
DJ Steward	September 8	Sacramento Kings	Stockton Kings (G League)	
Chandler Vaudrin	September 8	Cleveland Cavaliers	Winthrop (Undrafted in 2021)	
John Petty Jr.	September 9	New Orleans Pelicans	Birmingham Squadron (G League)	
Daeqwon Plowden	September 9	New Orleans Pelicans	Bowling Green (Undrafted in 2022)	
Joël Ayayi	September 12	Orlando Magic	Capital City Go-Go (G League)	
Jalen Crutcher	September 12	Charlotte Hornets	Greensboro Swarm (G League)	
Anthony Duruji	September 12	Charlotte Hornets	Florida (Undrafted in 2022)	
Quenton Jackson	September 12	Washington Wizards	Texas A&M (Undrafted in 2022)	
Davion Mintz	September 12	Washington Wizards	Kentucky (Undrafted in 2022)	
Jamorko Pickett	September 12	Detroit Pistons	Sioux Falls Skyforce (G League)	
Jaylen Sims	September 12	Charlotte Hornets	UNC Wilmington (Undrafted in 2022)	
Isaiah Whaley	September 12	Charlotte Hornets	UConn (Undrafted in 2022)	
Jordan Goodwin	September 13	Washington Wizards	Capital City Go-Go (G League)	
Montrezl Harrell	September 13	Philadelphia 76ers	Charlotte Hornets	
Paris Bass	September 14	Utah Jazz	South Bay Lakers (G League)	
Michael Devoe	September 14	Los Angeles Clippers	Georgia Tech (Undrafted in 2022)	
Justin Jackson	September 14	Boston Celtics	Texas Legends (G League)	
DaQuan Jeffries	September 14	New York Knicks	College Park Skyhawks (G League)	
Jake Layman	September 14	Boston Celtics	Minnesota Timberwolves	
KZ Okpala	September 14	Sacramento Kings	Oklahoma City Thunder	
Keifer Sykes	September 14	Detroit Pistons	Indiana Pacers (Waived on April 7)	
Denzel Valentine	September 14	Boston Celtics	Maine Celtics (G League)	
Keaton Wallace	September 14	Los Angeles Clippers	Ontario Clippers (G League)	
Lucas Williamson	September 14	Los Angeles Clippers	Loyola (Undrafted in 2022)	
Bennie Boatwright	September 15	Indiana Pacers	Fort Wayne Mad Ants (G League)	
Rob Edwards	September 15	Milwaukee Bucks	Oklahoma City Blue (G League)	
James Johnson	September 15	Indiana Pacers	Brooklyn Nets (Waived on April 7)	
David Stockton	September 15	Indiana Pacers	Memphis Hustle (G League)	
Alex Antetokounmpo	September 16	Milwaukee Bucks	Raptors 905 (G League)	
Chris Chiozza	September 16	Brooklyn Nets	Golden State Warriors	
Malik Ellison	September 16	Atlanta Hawks	College Park Skyhawks (G League)	
Dennis Schröder	September 16	Los Angeles Lakers	Houston Rockets	
Gabe York^{®}	September 16	Indiana Pacers (Previously on a two-way contract)		
Ryan Arcidiacono^{®}	September 17	New York Knicks		
Iverson Molinar	September 17	Milwaukee Bucks	Mississippi State (Undrafted in 2022)	
Ibou Badji	September 18	Milwaukee Bucks	ICG Força Lleida (Spain / Undrafted in 2022)	
Sviatoslav Mykhailiuk	September 18	New York Knicks	Toronto Raptors (Waived on August 29)	
Mamadi Diakite	September 19	Cleveland Cavaliers	Oklahoma City Thunder (Waived on February 9)	
Kyler Edwards	September 19	Detroit Pistons	Houston (Undrafted in 2022)	
Nate Hinton^{®}	September 19	Cleveland Cavaliers	Indiana Pacers (Previously on a two-way contract)	
Kent Bazemore	September 20	Sacramento Kings	Los Angeles Lakers	
Marcus Bingham Jr.	September 20	Dallas Mavericks	Michigan State (Undrafted in 2022)	
Marques Bolden	September 20	Milwaukee Bucks	Salt Lake City Stars (G League)	
Quinn Cook	September 20	Sacramento Kings	Stockton Kings (G League)	
Sharife Cooper	September 20	Cleveland Cavaliers	Atlanta Hawks (Waived on July 25)	
Frank Jackson**	September 20	Phoenix Suns	Detroit Pistons	
Dru Smith	September 20	Miami Heat	Sioux Falls Skyforce (G League)	
D.J. Stewart Jr.	September 20	Dallas Mavericks	San Antonio Spurs (Previously on a two-way contract)	
Dusty Hannahs	September 21	Golden State Warriors	Adelaide 36ers (Australia)	
Quinton Rose	September 21	New York Knicks	Westchester Knicks (G League)	
Luka Šamanić	September 21	Boston Celtics	New York Knicks (Waived on March 17)	
M. J. Walker	September 21	New York Knicks	Westchester Knicks (G League)	
Armoni Brooks	September 22	Atlanta Hawks	Toronto Raptors (Waived on July 30)	
Zylan Cheatham	September 22	New Orleans Pelicans	Birmingham Squadron (G League)	
Langston Galloway	September 22	Indiana Pacers	College Park Skyhawks (G League)	
Norvel Pelle	September 22	Indiana Pacers	Portland Trail Blazers (Waived on September 4)	
Justin Anderson	September 23	Indiana Pacers		
Justin Bean	September 23	Memphis Grizzlies	Utah State (Undrafted in 2022)	
Garrison Brooks	September 23	New York Knicks	Mississippi State (Undrafted in 2022)	
John Butler	September 23	New Orleans Pelicans	Florida State (Undrafted in 2022)	
Jacob Gilyard	September 23	Memphis Grizzlies	Richmond (Undrafted in 2022)	
Wes Iwundu	September 23	Portland Trail Blazers	Cleveland Charge (G League)	
Juwan Morgan	September 23	Los Angeles Clippers	Indiana Pacers (Waived on July 14)	
Nuni Omot	September 23	New York Knicks	Leones de Ponce (Puerto Rico)	
Dennis Smith Jr.	September 23	Charlotte Hornets	Portland Trail Blazers	
Brodric Thomas (RFA)	September 23	Boston Celtics (Previously on a two-way contract)		
Aleem Ford	September 24	Orlando Magic	Leones de Ponce (Puerto Rico)	
Timothé Luwawu-Cabarrot	September 24	Phoenix Suns	Atlanta Hawks	
Zavier Simpson	September 24	Orlando Magic	Oklahoma City Thunder	
Kostas Antetokounmpo	September 25	Chicago Bulls	LDLC ASVEL (France)	
Jules Bernard	September 25	Detroit Pistons	UCLA (Undrafted in 2022)	
Jalen Harris	September 25	New York Knicks	Scarborough Shooting Stars (Canada)	
Stanley Umude	September 25	Detroit Pistons	Arkansas (Undrafted in 2022)	
Marcus Zegarowski	September 25	Brooklyn Nets (Waived on September 17)		
Cody Zeller	September 25	Utah Jazz	Portland Trail Blazers	
Dwayne Bacon	September 26	Los Angeles Lakers	AS Monaco Basket (France)	
LiAngelo Ball	September 26	Charlotte Hornets	Greensboro Swarm (G League)	
PJ Dozier	September 26	Minnesota Timberwolves	Orlando Magic	
Grant Golden	September 26	Denver Nuggets	Richmond (Undrafted in 2022)	
RaiQuan Gray	September 26	Brooklyn Nets (Waived on September 22)		
Andre Iguodala	September 26	Golden State Warriors		
Jordan Nwora (RFA)	September 26	Milwaukee Bucks		
Matt Ryan	September 26	Los Angeles Lakers	Boston Celtics	
Devon Dotson	September 27	Washington Wizards	Windy City Bulls (G League)	
Kaiser Gates	September 29	Brooklyn Nets	Hapoel Bank Yahav Jerusalem (Israel)	
Brandon Rachal	October 1	Brooklyn Nets	Long Island Nets (G League)	
Bruno Fernando	October 2	Houston Rockets (Previously on a two-way contract)		
Sacha Killeya-Jones	October 2	Oklahoma City Thunder	Hapoel Gilboa Galil (Israel)	
Blake Griffin	October 3	Boston Celtics	Brooklyn Nets	
Nate Darling	October 4	Los Angeles Clippers	Ontario Clippers (G League)	
Malik Fitts	October 4	Los Angeles Clippers	Indiana Pacers (Waived on July 14)	
Ty Jerome	October 4	Golden State Warriors	Houston Rockets (Waived on October 1)	
Robert Woodard II	October 4	Oklahoma City Thunder	San Antonio Spurs (Previously on a two-way contract)	
Anthony Lamb	October 5	Golden State Warriors	Houston Rockets	
Noah Kirkwood	October 6	Brooklyn Nets	Harvard (Undrafted in 2022)	
Xavier Sneed	October 6	Charlotte Hornets	Utah Jazz (Waived on September 16)	
Jahmi'us Ramsey	October 7	Oklahoma City Thunder	Oklahoma City Blue (G League)	
Willie Cauley-Stein	October 8	Houston Rockets	Philadelphia 76ers	
L. J. Figueroa	October 8	Los Angeles Lakers	Santa Cruz Warriors (G League)	
Shaquille Harrison	October 8	Los Angeles Lakers	Brooklyn Nets	
Alex Morales	October 8	Orlando Magic	Wagner (Undrafted in 2022)	
Jay Scrubb	October 8	Orlando Magic	Los Angeles Clippers (Waived on July 27)	
Jaden Shackelford	October 8	Oklahoma City Thunder	Alabama (Undrafted in 2022)	
Darryl Morsell	October 9	Utah Jazz	Marquette (Undrafted in 2022)	
Mychal Mulder	October 9	Miami Heat (Waived on July 16)		
Chasson Randle	October 9	Denver Nuggets	Sky Sport Breakers (New Zealand)	
Chaundee Brown Jr.	October 10	San Antonio Spurs	Atlanta Hawks (Waived on September 11)	
Henri Drell	October 10	Chicago Bulls	Windy City Bulls (G League / Undrafted in 2022)	
Abdul Gaddy	October 10	Oklahoma City Thunder	Promitheas Patras (Greece)	
Grant Golden	October 10	Denver Nuggets (Waived on October 7)		
Bryce Hamilton	October 10	Los Angeles Lakers	UNLV (Undrafted in 2022)	
Matthew Hurt	October 10	Memphis Grizzlies	Memphis Hustle (G League)	
Drake Jeffries	October 10	Orlando Magic	Wyoming (Undrafted in 2022)	
Kelan Martin	October 10	New Orleans Pelicans	Grand Rapids Gold (G League)	
Skylar Mays	October 10	Philadelphia 76ers	Atlanta Hawks	
Patrick McCaw	October 10	Philadelphia 76ers	Delaware Blue Coats (G League)	
Mac McClung	October 10	Philadelphia 76ers	Golden State Warriors (Waived on October 3)	
Sean McDermott	October 10	Memphis Grizzlies	Memphis Hustle (G League)	
Javonte Smart	October 10	New Orleans Pelicans	Miami Heat (Waived on July 16)	
Justin Smith	October 10	Philadelphia 76ers	Raptors 905 (G League)	
Adonis Arms	October 11	Phoenix Suns	Denver Nuggets (Waived on October 7)	
Darius Days	October 11	Houston Rockets (Claimed off waivers)	Miami Heat (Waived on October 9)	
Saben Lee	October 11	Phoenix Suns	Utah Jazz (Waived on October 9)	
Trhae Mitchell	October 11	Houston Rockets	Rio Grande Valley Vipers (G League)	
Nate Pierre-Louis	October 11	Los Angeles Lakers	South Bay Lakers (G League)	
A. J. Reeves	October 11	Boston Celtics	Providence (Undrafted in 2022)	
Ethan Thompson	October 11	Chicago Bulls	Windy City Bulls (G League)	
Jeenathan Williams	October 11	Utah Jazz	Buffalo (Undrafted in 2022)	
Pierriá Henry	October 12	Houston Rockets	Fenerbahçe Beko (Turkey)	
Reginald Kissoonlal	October 12	Boston Celtics	Randers Cimbria (Denmark)	
Aminu Mohammed	October 12	Philadelphia 76ers	Georgetown (Undrafted in 2022)	
Adam Mokoka	October 12	Oklahoma City Thunder	Nanterre 92 (France)	
Jontay Porter	October 12	Milwaukee Bucks	Memphis Grizzlies (Waived on July 31, 2021)	
Simisola Shittu	October 12	Orlando Magic	Lakeland Magic (G League)	
Craig Sword	October 12	Washington Wizards	Capital City Go-Go (G League)	
Okaro White	October 12	Chicago Bulls	Panathinaikos (Greece)	
Donovan Williams	October 12	Brooklyn Nets	UNLV (Undrafted in 2022)	
Stephen Zimmerman	October 12	San Antonio Spurs	Cairns Taipans (Australia)	
Eric Demers	October 13	Boston Celtics	Maine Celtics (G League)	
Sekou Doumbouya	October 13	Philadelphia 76ers	Los Angeles Lakers (Waived on March 3)	
Jordan Ford	October 13	Sacramento Kings	Ontario Clippers (G League)	
Wes Iwundu	October 13	Sacramento Kings	Portland Trail Blazers (Waived on October 7)	
EJ Onu	October 13	Memphis Grizzlies	Niagara River Lions (Canada)	
Romeo Weems	October 13	Memphis Grizzlies	Memphis Hustle (G League)	
Jalen Adaway	October 14	San Antonio Spurs	St. Bonaventure (Undrafted in 2022)	
James Akinjo	October 14	New York Knicks	Baylor (Undrafted in 2022)	
Eli Brooks	October 14	Indiana Pacers	Michigan (Undrafted in 2022)	
Tevin Brown	October 14	Indiana Pacers	Murray State (Undrafted in 2022)	
Devontae Cacok	October 14	Detroit Pistons	Portland Trail Blazers (Waived on October 7)	
Jon Elmore	October 14	Miami Heat	Šiaulių Šiauliai-7bet (Lithuania)	
Scotty Hopson	October 14	Oklahoma City Thunder	Dynamo Lebanon (Lebanon)	
Jeriah Horne	October 14	Sacramento Kings	Tulsa (Undrafted in 2022)	
Elijah Hughes	October 14	Milwaukee Bucks	Portland Trail Blazers	
Dakota Mathias	October 14	Memphis Grizzlies	Texas Legends (G League)	
Alex O'Connell	October 14	Sacramento Kings	Creighton (Undrafted in 2022)	
Jared Rhoden	October 14	Atlanta Hawks (Claimed off waivers)	Portland Trail Blazers (Waived on October 12)	
Grant Riller	October 14	Dallas Mavericks	Philadelphia 76ers (Waived on December 21, 2021)	
Jermaine Samuels	October 14	Indiana Pacers	Villanova (Undrafted in 2022)	
Marial Shayok	October 14	Boston Celtics	Fenerbahçe Beko (Turkey)	
D.J. Stewart Jr.	October 14	Miami Heat (Claimed off waivers)	Dallas Mavericks (Waived on October 11)	
Bryson Williams	October 14	Los Angeles Clippers	Texas Tech (Undrafted in 2022)	
Ty-Shon Alexander	October 15	Charlotte Hornets	Pallacanestro Trieste (Italy)	
Tyler Cook	October 15	Utah Jazz	Chicago Bulls	
Jaime Echenique	October 15	Washington Wizards	Capital City Go-Go (G League)	
Ryan Hawkins	October 15	Toronto Raptors	Creighton (Undrafted in 2022)	
Frank Jackson	October 15	Utah Jazz	Phoenix Suns (Waived on October 11)	
David Johnson (RFA)	October 15	Toronto Raptors (Previously on a two-way contract)		
Matt Lewis	October 15	Minnesota Timberwolves	Iowa Wolves (G League)	
Isaiah Miller	October 15	Utah Jazz	Portland Trail Blazers (Waived on October 12)	
Emmanuel Mudiay	October 15	Minnesota Timberwolves	Sacramento Kings	
Reggie Perry	October 15	Toronto Raptors	Portland Trail Blazers	
Christian Vital	October 15	Toronto Raptors	Hamilton Honey Badgers (Canada)	
Phillip Wheeler	October 15	Minnesota Timberwolves	Capitanes de la Ciudad de México (G League / Undrafted in 2022)	
Isaiah Joe	October 16	Oklahoma City Thunder	Philadelphia 76ers (Waived on October 13)	
Saben Lee	October 16	Toronto Raptors	Phoenix Suns (Waived on October 13)	
Facundo Campazzo	October 18	Dallas Mavericks	Denver Nuggets	
Jordan Hall	November 2	San Antonio Spurs (Waived on October 24)		
Alize Johnson	November 29	San Antonio Spurs	Austin Spurs (G League)	
Kemba Walker	November 29	Dallas Mavericks	Detroit Pistons (Waived on October 17)	
Stanley Johnson	December 13	San Antonio Spurs	Sioux Falls Skyforce (G League)	
Sterling Brown	January 6	Los Angeles Lakers	Raptors 905 (G League)	
Joe Wieskamp	January 7	Toronto Raptors	Wisconsin Herd (G League)	
Gorgui Dieng	January 8	San Antonio Spurs (Waived on January 5)		
PJ Dozier	January 9	Sacramento Kings	Iowa Wolves (G League)	
Derrick Favors	January 11	Atlanta Hawks	Houston Rockets (Waived on October 17)	
Saben Lee	January 11	Phoenix Suns	Raptors 905 (G League)	
Joe Wieskamp	January 17	Toronto Raptors (Second 10-day contract)		
PJ Dozier	January 19	Sacramento Kings (Second 10-day contract)		
Gorgui Dieng	January 20	San Antonio Spurs (Second 10-day contract)		
Saben Lee	January 21	Phoenix Suns (Second 10-day contract)		
Deonte Burton	January 30	Sacramento Kings	Stockton Kings (G League)	
Chris Silva	January 31	Dallas Mavericks	College Park Skyhawks (G League)	
Jamaree Bouyea	February 7	Miami Heat	Sioux Falls Skyforce (G League)	
Gorgui Dieng	February 10	San Antonio Spurs (Signed for rest of season; last 10-day contract ended January 30)		
Eugene Omoruyi	February 10	Oklahoma City Thunder (Previously on two-way contract)		
Chris Silva	February 10	Dallas Mavericks (Second 10-day contract)		
Stanley Umude	February 10	Detroit Pistons	Motor City Cruise (G League)	
Joe Wieskamp	February 11	Toronto Raptors (Signed to multi-year contract; last 10-day contract ended January 27)		
Goga Bitadze	February 13	Orlando Magic	Indiana Pacers (Waived on February 9)	
James Johnson	February 13	Indiana Pacers (Signed for rest of season; previously waived on February 9)		
Boban Marjanović	February 13	Houston Rockets (Signed for rest of season; previously waived on February 9)		
Charles Bassey	February 14	San Antonio Spurs (Previously on a two-way contract)		
Dewayne Dedmon	February 14	Philadelphia 76ers	Miami Heat (Waived on February 9)	
Reggie Jackson	February 14	Denver Nuggets	Charlotte Hornets (Waived on February 12)	
Danny Green	February 15	Cleveland Cavaliers	Houston Rockets (Waived on February 12)	
Justin Holiday	February 15	Dallas Mavericks	Houston Rockets (Waived on February 13)	
Terrence Ross	February 15	Phoenix Suns	Orlando Magic (Waived on February 12)	
Kevin Love	February 20	Miami Heat	Cleveland Cavaliers (Waived on February 18)	
Cody Zeller	February 20	Miami Heat	Utah Jazz (Waived on October 15)	
Patrick Beverley	February 21	Chicago Bulls	Orlando Magic (Waived on February 12)	
Admiral Schofield	February 21	Orlando Magic (Previously on a two-way contract)		
Kris Dunn	February 22	Utah Jazz	Capital City Go-Go (G League)	
Frank Jackson	February 22	Utah Jazz	Salt Lake City Stars (G League)	
Meyers Leonard	February 22	Milwaukee Bucks	Oklahoma City Thunder (Waived on March 25, 2021)	
Russell Westbrook	February 22	Los Angeles Clippers	Utah Jazz (Waived on February 20)	
R. J. Hampton	February 23	Detroit Pistons	Orlando Magic (Waived on February 21)	
Trevor Keels	February 23	New York Knicks (Previously on a two-way contract)		
Jordan Goodwin	February 24	Washington Wizards (Previously on a two-way contract)		
Ish Wainright	February 24	Phoenix Suns (Previously on a two-way contract)		
PJ Dozier	February 25	Sacramento Kings (Signed for rest of season; Second 10-day contract ended January 29)		
Michael Carter-Williams	February 26	Orlando Magic (Previously waived on February 10, 2022)		
Bryce McGowens	February 26	Charlotte Hornets (Previously on a two-way contract)		
Willie Cauley-Stein	February 27	Houston Rockets	Rio Grande Valley Vipers (G League)	
Lindy Waters III	February 27	Oklahoma City Thunder (Previously on a two-way contract)		
Will Barton	February 28	Toronto Raptors	Washington Wizards (Waived on February 21)	
Lester Quiñones	March 2	Golden State Warriors	Santa Cruz Warriors (G League)	
Jamaree Bouyea	March 3	Washington Wizards	Sioux Falls Skyforce (G League)	
Carlik Jones	March 3	Chicago Bulls (Previously on a two-way contract)		
Sandro Mamukelashvili	March 3	San Antonio Spurs (Claimed off waivers)	Milwaukee Bucks (March 1)	
Sam Merrill	March 3	Cleveland Cavaliers	Cleveland Charge (G League)	
Eugene Omoruyi	March 3	Detroit Pistons	Oklahoma City Thunder (Waived on February 26)	
Goran Dragić	March 4	Milwaukee Bucks	Chicago Bulls (Waived on February 28)	
Kris Dunn	March 4	Utah Jazz (Second 10-day contract)		
Meyers Leonard	March 4	Milwaukee Bucks (Second 10-day contract)		
DaQuan Jeffries	March 5	New York Knicks (Previously on a two-way contract)		
Nerlens Noel	March 6	Brooklyn Nets	Detroit Pistons (Waived on February 28)	
Eugene Omoruyi	March 13	Detroit Pistons (Second 10-day contract)		
Kris Dunn	March 14	Utah Jazz (Signed to multi-year contract)		
Meyers Leonard	March 14	Milwaukee Bucks (Signed for rest of season)		
Sam Merrill	March 14	Cleveland Cavaliers (Signed to multi-year contract)		
DaQuan Jeffries	March 16	New York Knicks (Second 10-day contract)		
Moses Brown	March 17	Brooklyn Nets	New York Knicks (Waived on March 12)	
Xavier Cooks	March 17	Washington Wizards	Sydney Kings (Australia)	
Anthony Lamb	March 17	Golden State Warriors (Previously on a two-way contract)		
Jarrell Brantley	March 18	Utah Jazz	New Zealand Breakers (New Zealand)	
D. J. Augustin	March 23	Houston Rockets (Signed for rest of season)	Los Angeles Lakers	
Eugene Omoruyi	March 23	Detroit Pistons (Signed for rest of season)		
DaQuan Jeffries	March 26	New York Knicks (Signed to multi-year contract)		
Moses Brown	March 28	Brooklyn Nets (Second 10-day contract)		
Luka Šamanić	March 28	Utah Jazz	Maine Celtics (G League)	
Xavier Sneed	March 28	Charlotte Hornets	Greensboro Swarm (G League)	
Shaquille Harrison	March 30	Portland Trail Blazers	South Bay Lakers (G League)	
Skylar Mays	March 30	Portland Trail Blazers	Capitanes de la Ciudad de México (G League)	
Jeenathan Williams	April 1	Portland Trail Blazers (Signed to multi-year contract)	Salt Lake City Stars (G League)	
Justin Minaya	April 4	Portland Trail Blazers (Signed for rest of season)	Capitanes de la Ciudad de México (G League)	
Justin Champagnie	April 7	Boston Celtics (Signed to multi-year contract)	Sioux Falls Skyforce (G League)	
David Duke Jr.	April 7	Brooklyn Nets (Previously on a two-way contract)		
Luka Šamanić	April 7	Utah Jazz (Signed to multi-year contract)		
Kobi Simmons	April 7	Charlotte Hornets (Previously on a two-way contract)		
Vernon Carey Jr.	April 8	Utah Jazz (Signed to multi-year contract)	Washington Wizards (Waived on March 1)	
Kenneth Lofton Jr.	April 8	Memphis Grizzlies (Previously on a two-way contract)		
Willie Cauley-Stein	April 9	Houston Rockets (Signed for rest of season)	Rio Grande Valley Vipers (G League)	
Chance Comanche	April 9	Portland Trail Blazers (Signed for rest of season)	Stockton Kings (G League)	
Shaquille Harrison	April 9	Los Angeles Lakers (Signed for rest of season)	Portland Trail Blazers (10-day contract ended April 8)	
Skylar Mays	April 9	Portland Trail Blazers (Signed for rest of season)		
Isaiah Roby	April 9	New York Knicks (Signed to multi-year contract)	San Antonio Spurs (Waived on March 3)	
Tristan Thompson	April 9	Los Angeles Lakers (Signed for rest of season)	Chicago Bulls	
Ryan Arcidiacono			Portland Trail Blazers (Waived on April 1)	
Kent Bazemore			Sacramento Kings (Waived on October 13)	
DeAndre' Bembry			Milwaukee Bucks	
Avery Bradley			Los Angeles Lakers	
Tony Bradley			Chicago Bulls (Waived on February 21)	
Miles Bridges (RFA)			Charlotte Hornets	
Marquese Chriss			Oklahoma City Thunder (Waived on October 17)	
Wayne Ellington			Los Angeles Lakers	
Derrick Favors			Atlanta Hawks (10-day contract ended January 21)	
Bryn Forbes			Minnesota Timberwolves (Waived on February 9)	
Brandon Goodwin			Cleveland Cavaliers	
Maurice Harkless			Houston Rockets (Waived on October 11)	
Juancho Hernangómez			Toronto Raptors (Waived on February 28)	
Rodney Hood			Los Angeles Clippers	
Serge Ibaka			Indiana Pacers (Waived on February 11)	
Jeremy Lamb			Sacramento Kings	
Scottie Lewis			Charlotte Hornets	
Paul Millsap			Philadelphia 76ers	
Abdel Nader			Phoenix Suns	
Nerlens Noel			Brooklyn Nets (10-day contract ended March 16)	
KZ Okpala			Sacramento Kings (Waived on February 25)	
Joshua Primo			San Antonio Spurs (Waived on October 28)	
Trevelin Queen			Indiana Pacers (Waived on March 29; previously on a two-way contract)	
Rajon Rondo			Cleveland Cavaliers	
Jay Scrubb			Orlando Magic (Waived on June 5)	
Nik Stauskas			Indiana Pacers (Waived on July 14)	
Brodric Thomas			Boston Celtics (Waived on October 12)	
Isaiah Thomas			Charlotte Hornets	
Killian Tillie			Memphis Grizzlies (Waived on October 15)	
Noah Vonleh			San Antonio Spurs (Waived on January 5)	
Kemba Walker			Dallas Mavericks (Waived on January 6)	
John Wall			Houston Rockets (Waived on February 12)	
Lou Williams			Atlanta Hawks	

* Player option
** Team option
*** Early termination option

=== Two-way contracts ===
Per recent NBA rules implemented as of the 2017–18 season, teams are permitted to have two two-way players on their roster at any given time, in addition to their 15-man regular season roster. A two-way player will provide services primarily to the team's G League affiliate, but can spend up to 45 days with the parent NBA team. Only players with four or fewer years of NBA experience are able to sign two-way contracts, which can be for either one season or two. Players entering training camp for a team have a chance to convert their training camp deal into a two-way contract if they prove themselves worthy enough for it. Teams also have the option to convert a two-way contract into a regular, minimum-salary NBA contract, at which point the player becomes a regular member of the parent NBA team. Two-way players are not eligible for NBA playoff rosters, so a team must convert any two-way players it wants to use in the playoffs, waiving another player in the process.

Denotes players who were promoted to the main roster
Denotes players who were cut before season's end

Player	Date signed	Team	School / Club team	Ref
A. J. Green	July 1	Milwaukee Bucks	Northern Iowa (Undrafted in 2022)	
Trevor Hudgins	July 1	Houston Rockets	Northwest Missouri State (Undrafted in 2022)	
Kenneth Lofton Jr.	July 1	Memphis Grizzlies	Louisiana Tech (Undrafted in 2022)	
Scotty Pippen Jr.	July 1	Los Angeles Lakers	Vanderbilt (Undrafted in 2022)	
Cole Swider	July 1	Los Angeles Lakers	Syracuse (Undrafted in 2022)	
Buddy Boeheim	July 2	Detroit Pistons	Syracuse (Undrafted in 2022)	
Julian Champagnie	July 2	Philadelphia 76ers	St. John's (Undrafted in 2022)	
Keon Ellis	July 2	Sacramento Kings	Alabama (Undrafted in 2022)	
Bryce McGowens	July 2	Charlotte Hornets	Nebraska	
Isaiah Mobley	July 2	Cleveland Cavaliers	USC	
RJ Nembhard (RFA)	July 2	Cleveland Cavaliers (Previously on a two-way contract)		
Eugene Omoruyi	July 2	Oklahoma City Thunder	Dallas Mavericks (Previously on a two-way contract)	
Neemias Queta (RFA)	July 2	Sacramento Kings (Previously on a two-way contract)		
Vince Williams Jr.	July 2	Memphis Grizzlies	VCU	
Collin Gillespie	July 3	Denver Nuggets	Villanova (Undrafted in 2022)	
Alondes Williams	July 4	Brooklyn Nets	Wake Forest (Undrafted in 2022)	
Lester Quiñones	July 5	Golden State Warriors	Memphis (Undrafted in 2022)	
Justin Lewis	July 7	Chicago Bulls	Marquette (Undrafted in 2022)	
JD Davison	July 9	Boston Celtics	Alabama	
Trevor Keels	July 10	New York Knicks	Duke	
Dominick Barlow	July 10	San Antonio Spurs	Team Overtime (Undrafted in 2022)	
Ron Harper Jr.	July 13	Toronto Raptors	Rutgers (Undrafted in 2022)	
Johnny Juzang	July 15	Utah Jazz	UCLA (Undrafted in 2022)	
Darius Days	July 16	Miami Heat	LSU (Undrafted in 2022)	
Marcus Garrett	July 16	Miami Heat (Previously on a two-way contract)		
Mfiondu Kabengele	July 16	Boston Celtics	Rio Grande Valley Vipers (G League)	
Jeff Dowtin	July 19	Toronto Raptors	Lakeland Magic (G League)	
Jack White	July 19	Denver Nuggets	Melbourne United (Australia)	
Sharife Cooper	July 21	Atlanta Hawks (Previously on a two-way contract)		
Moussa Diabaté	July 22	Los Angeles Clippers	Michigan	
Admiral Schofield	July 22	Orlando Magic (Previously on a two-way contract)		
Quinndary Weatherspoon	July 22	Golden State Warriors (Previously on a two-way contract)		
Tyler Dorsey	July 23	Dallas Mavericks	Olympiacos (Greece)	
Kevon Harris	July 25	Orlando Magic	Raptors 905 (G League)	
A. J. Lawson	July 26	Minnesota Timberwolves	Guelph Nighthawks (Canada)	
Eric Paschall	July 29	Minnesota Timberwolves	Utah Jazz	
Duane Washington Jr.	August 3	Phoenix Suns	Indiana Pacers (Waived July 14)	
Ish Wainright	August 4	Phoenix Suns		
Trent Forrest	August 8	Atlanta Hawks	Utah Jazz	
Jordan Hall	August 11	San Antonio Spurs	St. Joseph's (Undrafted in 2022)	
Malcolm Hill	September 7	Chicago Bulls (Previously on a two-way contract)		
Dereon Seabron	September 9	New Orleans Pelicans	NC State (Undrafted in 2022)	
Izaiah Brockington	September 12	New Orleans Pelicans	Iowa State (Undrafted in 2022)	
Jarrett Culver	September 12	Atlanta Hawks	Memphis Grizzlies	
Kendall Brown	September 16	Indiana Pacers	Baylor	
David Duke Jr.	September 16	Brooklyn Nets (Previously on a two-way contract)		
Bruno Fernando	September 30	Houston Rockets		
John Butler	October 3	New Orleans Pelicans		
Jamal Cain	October 9	Miami Heat		
Trevelin Queen	October 11	Indiana Pacers	Philadelphia 76ers (Waived on October 9)	
Micah Potter	October 12	Utah Jazz	Detroit Pistons (Waived on September 14)	
Olivier Sarr	October 13	Portland Trail Blazers		
Dru Smith	October 13	Miami Heat		
Kostas Antetokounmpo	October 14	Chicago Bulls		
Luka Garza	October 14	Minnesota Timberwolves		
Ty Jerome	October 14	Golden State Warriors		
Anthony Lamb	October 14	Golden State Warriors		
Moses Brown	October 15	Los Angeles Clippers		
Jordan Goodwin	October 15	Washington Wizards		
Théo Maledon	October 15	Charlotte Hornets	Oklahoma City Thunder (Waived on October 11)	
McKinley Wright IV	October 15	Dallas Mavericks		
Michael Foster Jr.	October 16	Philadelphia 76ers		
E. J. Liddell	October 16	New Orleans Pelicans	Ohio State	
Darius Days	October 17	Houston Rockets		
Mamadi Diakite	October 17	Cleveland Cavaliers (Waived on October 15)		
Didi Louzada	October 17	Cleveland Cavaliers	Portland Trail Blazers (Waived on August 29)	
John Butler	October 20	Portland Trail Blazers	New Orleans Pelicans (Waived on October 10)	
Charles Bassey	October 24	San Antonio Spurs	Philadelphia 76ers (Waived on October 13)	
Orlando Robinson	November 13	Miami Heat	Sioux Falls Skyforce (G League)	
A. J. Lawson	November 16	Minnesota Timberwolves	College Park Skyhawks (G League)	
Ibou Badji	November 18	Portland Trail Blazers	Wisconsin Herd (G League)	
Devon Dotson	November 20	Washington Wizards	Capital City Go-Go (G League)	
Saben Lee	November 23	Philadelphia 76ers	Raptors 905 (G League)	
Dru Smith	November 25	Miami Heat	Sioux Falls Skyforce (G League)	
DaQuan Jeffries	November 29	New York Knicks	Westchester Knicks (G League)	
Matt Ryan	December 8	Minnesota Timberwolves	Los Angeles Lakers (Waived on December 1)	
Orlando Robinson	December 11	Miami Heat	Sioux Falls Skyforce (G League)	
Carlik Jones	December 16	Chicago Bulls	Windy City Bulls (G League)	
Louis King	December 26	Philadelphia 76ers	Rio Grande Valley Vipers (G League)	
A. J. Lawson	December 26	Dallas Mavericks	College Park Skyhawks (G League)	
Jared Rhoden	December 27	Detroit Pistons	College Park Skyhawks (G League)	
Dru Smith	January 13	Brooklyn Nets	Sioux Falls Skyforce (G League)	
Donovan Williams	January 17	Atlanta Hawks	Long Island Nets (G League)	
Saben Lee	February 1	Phoenix Suns (Previously on 10-day contract)		
Quenton Jackson	February 10	Washington Wizards	Capital City Go-Go (G League)	
Olivier Sarr	February 12	Oklahoma City Thunder	Oklahoma City Blue (G League)	
Mac McClung	February 14	Philadelphia 76ers	Delaware Blue Coats (G League)	
Julian Champagnie	February 16	San Antonio Spurs (Claimed off waivers)	Philadelphia 76ers (Waived on February 14)	
Nate Darling	February 17	Los Angeles Clippers	Ontario Clippers (G League)	
Terry Taylor	February 22	Chicago Bulls	Indiana Pacers (Waived on February 9)	
Keaton Wallace	February 22	Los Angeles Clippers	Ontario Clippers (G League)	
Duane Washington Jr.	February 28	New York Knicks	Phoenix Suns (Waived on February 1)	
Jay Huff	March 1	Washington Wizards	South Bay Lakers(G League)	
Xavier Moon	March 1	Los Angeles Clippers	Ontario Clippers (G League)	
Jared Butler	March 3	Oklahoma City Thunder	Grand Rapids Gold (G League)	
Justin Lewis	March 7	Chicago Bulls (Previously waived on October 14)		
Lindell Wigginton	March 7	Milwaukee Bucks	Wisconsin Herd (G League)	
Moses Brown	March 8	New York Knicks	Los Angeles Clippers (Waived on February 17)	
Trevor Keels	March 12	New York Knicks	Westchester Knicks (G League)	
Lester Quiñones	March 17	Golden State Warriors	Santa Cruz Warriors (G League)	
Jay Scrubb	March 24	Orlando Magic	Lakeland Magic (G League)	
Kobi Simmons	March 30	Charlotte Hornets	Greensboro Swarm (G League)	
Gabe York	March 30	Indiana Pacers	Fort Wayne Mad Ants (G League)	
Xavier Sneed	April 7	Charlotte Hornets (Previously on 10-day contract)		
Jacob Gilyard	April 8	Memphis Grizzlies	Memphis Hustle (G League)	
RaiQuan Gray	April 8	Brooklyn Nets	Long Island Nets (G League)	
Dereon Seabron	April 9	New Orleans Pelicans (Previously waived on April 6)		

=== Going to other North American leagues ===
The new league of all players is NBA G League, although some players have returned to their former team, as shown below. The NBA contract status of nearly all players is unrestricted free agent, and the rest is stated otherwise.

*	Denotes G-League players who returned to their former team
^{†}	Previously on a two-way contract
	Denotes players whose NBA contract status is unsigned draft pick

Player	Date signed	New team	NBA team	Ref
Alex Antetokounmpo	October 22	Wisconsin Herd	Milwaukee Bucks	
Ibou Badji	October 22	Wisconsin Herd	Milwaukee Bucks	
Armoni Brooks	October 22	College Park Skyhawks	Atlanta Hawks	
Bruno Caboclo	October 22	Capitanes de la Ciudad de México	Boston Celtics	
Devin Cannady	October 22	South Bay Lakers	Orlando Magic	
Willie Cauley-Stein	October 22	Rio Grande Valley Vipers	Houston Rockets	
Gary Clark	October 22	Capitanes de la Ciudad de México	New Orleans Pelicans	
Eric Demers*	October 22	Maine Celtics	Boston Celtics	
Rob Edwards	October 22	Wisconsin Herd	Milwaukee Bucks	
Malik Ellison*	October 22	College Park Skyhawks	Atlanta Hawks	
Tyson Etienne	October 22	College Park Skyhawks	Atlanta Hawks	
L. J. Figueroa	October 22	South Bay Lakers	Los Angeles Lakers	
Bryce Hamilton	October 22	South Bay Lakers	Los Angeles Lakers	
Shaquille Harrison	October 22	South Bay Lakers	Los Angeles Lakers	
Jay Huff	October 22	South Bay Lakers	Los Angeles Lakers	
Elijah Hughes	October 22	Wisconsin Herd	Milwaukee Bucks	
Mason Jones	October 22	Capitanes de la Ciudad de México	Los Angeles Lakers	
Reginald Kissoonlal	October 22	Maine Celtics	Boston Celtics	
A. J. Lawson*^{†}	October 22	College Park Skyhawks	Minnesota Timberwolves	
Javante McCoy	October 22	South Bay Lakers	Los Angeles Lakers	
Alfonzo McKinnie*	October 22	Capitanes de la Ciudad de México	Chicago Bulls	
Sam Merrill	October 22	Cleveland Charge	Sacramento Kings	
Trhae Mitchell	October 22	Rio Grande Valley Vipers	Houston Rockets	
Iverson Molinar	October 22	Wisconsin Herd	Milwaukee Bucks	
Nate Pierre-Louis	October 22	South Bay Lakers	Los Angeles Lakers	
Jontay Porter	October 22	Wisconsin Herd	Milwaukee Bucks	
A. J. Reeves	October 22	Maine Celtics	Boston Celtics	
Jared Rhoden	October 22	College Park Skyhawks	Atlanta Hawks	
Luka Šamanić	October 22	Maine Celtics	Boston Celtics	
Marial Shayok	October 22	Maine Celtics	Boston Celtics	
Chris Silva	October 22	College Park Skyhawks	Atlanta Hawks	
Denzel Valentine*	October 22	Maine Celtics	Boston Celtics	
Fabian White Jr.	October 22	South Bay Lakers	Los Angeles Lakers	
Joe Wieskamp	October 22	Wisconsin Herd	San Antonio Spurs	
Lindell Wigginton	October 22	Wisconsin Herd	Milwaukee Bucks	
Brandon Williams^{†}	October 22	College Park Skyhawks	Portland Trail Blazers	
James Akinjo	October 23	Westchester Knicks	New York Knicks	
Ty-Shon Alexander	October 23	Greensboro Swarm	Charlotte Hornets	
Justin Anderson	October 23	Fort Wayne Mad Ants	Indiana Pacers	
LiAngelo Ball*	October 23	Greensboro Swarm	Charlotte Hornets	
Justin Bean	October 23	Memphis Hustle	Memphis Grizzlies	
Marcus Bingham Jr.	October 23	Texas Legends	Dallas Mavericks	
Bennie Boatwright	October 23	Fort Wayne Mad Ants	Indiana Pacers	
Eli Brooks	October 23	Fort Wayne Mad Ants	Indiana Pacers	
Garrison Brooks	October 23	Westchester Knicks	New York Knicks	
Tevin Brown	October 23	Fort Wayne Mad Ants	Indiana Pacers	
Sharife Cooper	October 23	Cleveland Charge	Cleveland Cavaliers	
Jalen Crutcher*	October 23	Greensboro Swarm	Charlotte Hornets	
Henri Drell*	October 23	Windy City Bulls	Chicago Bulls	
Anthony Duruji	October 23	Greensboro Swarm	Charlotte Hornets	
Jaime Echenique	October 23	Capital City Go-Go	Washington Wizards	
Javon Freeman-Liberty	October 23	Windy City Bulls	Chicago Bulls	
Jacob Gilyard	October 23	Memphis Hustle	Memphis Grizzlies	
Mouhamadou Gueye	October 23	Texas Legends	Dallas Mavericks	
Tyler Hall	October 23	Texas Legends	Dallas Mavericks	
Jalen Harris	October 23	Westchester Knicks	New York Knicks	
Nate Hinton	October 23	Cleveland Charge	Cleveland Cavaliers	
Matthew Hurt	October 23	Memphis Hustle	Memphis Grizzlies	
DaQuan Jeffries	October 23	Westchester Knicks	New York Knicks	
Carlik Jones	October 23	Windy City Bulls	Chicago Bulls	
Didi Louzada^{†}	October 23	Cleveland Charge	Cleveland Cavaliers	
Dakota Mathias	October 23	Memphis Hustle	Memphis Grizzlies	
Sean McDermott	October 23	Memphis Hustle	Memphis Grizzlies	
Nuni Omot	October 23	Westchester Knicks	New York Knicks	
EJ Onu	October 23	Memphis Hustle	Memphis Grizzlies	
Norvel Pelle	October 23	Fort Wayne Mad Ants	Indiana Pacers	
Jamorko Pickett	October 23	Cleveland Charge	Cleveland Cavaliers	
Grant Riller	October 23	Texas Legends	Dallas Mavericks	
Quinton Rose	October 23	Westchester Knicks	New York Knicks	
Jermaine Samuels	October 23	Fort Wayne Mad Ants	Indiana Pacers	
Jaylen Sims	October 23	Greensboro Swarm	Charlotte Hornets	
Deividas Sirvydis	October 23	Fort Wayne Mad Ants	Indiana Pacers	
Xavier Sneed	October 23	Greensboro Swarm	Charlotte Hornets	
David Stockton	October 23	Fort Wayne Mad Ants	Indiana Pacers	
Craig Sword	October 23	Capital City Go-Go	Washington Wizards	
Ethan Thompson*	October 23	Windy City Bulls	Chicago Bulls	
Chandler Vaudrin	October 23	Cleveland Charge	Cleveland Cavaliers	
M. J. Walker	October 23	Westchester Knicks	New York Knicks	
Romeo Weems	October 23	Memphis Hustle	Memphis Grizzlies	
Isaiah Whaley	October 23	Greensboro Swarm	Charlotte Hornets	
Okaro White	October 23	Windy City Bulls	Chicago Bulls	
Gabe York	October 23	Fort Wayne Mad Ants	Indiana Pacers	
Jalen Adaway	October 24	Austin Spurs	San Antonio Spurs	
Paris Bass	October 24	Salt Lake City Stars	Utah Jazz	
Marques Bolden	October 24	Salt Lake City Stars	Milwaukee Bucks	
Jamaree Bouyea	October 24	Sioux Falls Skyforce	Miami Heat	
Charlie Brown Jr.	October 24	Delaware Blue Coats	Philadelphia 76ers	
Chaundee Brown Jr.	October 24	Austin Spurs	San Antonio Spurs	
Gabe Brown	October 24	Raptors 905	Toronto Raptors	
Zylan Cheatham	October 24	Birmingham Squadron	New Orleans Pelicans	
Chris Chiozza	October 24	Long Island Nets	Brooklyn Nets	
Tyler Cook	October 24	Salt Lake City Stars	Utah Jazz	
Nate Darling	October 24	Ontario Clippers	Los Angeles Clippers	
Michael Devoe	October 24	Ontario Clippers	Los Angeles Clippers	
Devon Dotson	October 24	Capital City Go-Go	Washington Wizards	
Sekou Doumbouya	October 24	Delaware Blue Coats	Philadelphia 76ers	
PJ Dozier	October 24	Iowa Wolves	Minnesota Timberwolves	
C. J. Elleby	October 24	Iowa Wolves	Minnesota Timberwolves	
Jon Elmore	October 24	Sioux Falls Skyforce	Miami Heat	
Malik Fitts	October 24	Ontario Clippers	Los Angeles Clippers	
Jordan Ford	October 24	Stockton Kings	Sacramento Kings	
Melvin Frazier	October 24	Raptors 905	Oklahoma City Thunder	
Marcus Garrett	October 24	Sioux Falls Skyforce	Miami Heat	
Kaiser Gates	October 24	Long Island Nets	Brooklyn Nets	
RaiQuan Gray*	October 24	Long Island Nets	Brooklyn Nets	
Dusty Hannahs	October 24	Santa Cruz Warriors	Golden State Warriors	
Ryan Hawkins	October 24	Raptors 905	Toronto Raptors	
Jeriah Horne	October 24	Stockton Kings	Sacramento Kings	
Wes Iwundu	October 24	Stockton Kings	Sacramento Kings	
Frank Jackson	October 24	Salt Lake City Stars	Utah Jazz	
Quenton Jackson	October 24	Capital City Go-Go	Washington Wizards	
Alize Johnson	October 24	Austin Spurs	San Antonio Spurs	
David Johnson	October 24	Raptors 905	Toronto Raptors	
Noah Kirkwood	October 24	Long Island Nets	Brooklyn Nets	
Tommy Kuhse	October 24	Austin Spurs	San Antonio Spurs	
Saben Lee	October 24	Raptors 905	Toronto Raptors	
Matt Lewis	October 24	Iowa Wolves	Minnesota Timberwolves	
Makur Maker	October 24	Capital City Go-Go	Washington Wizards	
Kelan Martin	October 24	Birmingham Squadron	New Orleans Pelicans	
Skylar Mays	October 24	Delaware Blue Coats	Philadelphia 76ers	
Patrick McCaw	October 24	Delaware Blue Coats	Philadelphia 76ers	
Mac McClung	October 24	Delaware Blue Coats	Philadelphia 76ers	
Isaiah Miller	October 24	Salt Lake City Stars	Utah Jazz	
Davion Mintz	October 24	Capital City Go-Go	Washington Wizards	
Aminu Mohammed	October 24	Delaware Blue Coats	Philadelphia 76ers	
Xavier Moon	October 24	Ontario Clippers	Los Angeles Clippers	
Darryl Morsell	October 24	Salt Lake City Stars	Utah Jazz	
Emmanuel Mudiay	October 24	Iowa Wolves	Minnesota Timberwolves	
Juwan Morgan	October 24	Ontario Clippers	Los Angeles Clippers	
Mychal Mulder	October 24	Sioux Falls Skyforce	Miami Heat	
Alex O'Connell	October 24	Stockton Kings	Sacramento Kings	
Reggie Perry	October 24	Raptors 905	Toronto Raptors	
John Petty Jr.	October 24	Birmingham Squadron	New Orleans Pelicans	
Daeqwon Plowden	October 24	Birmingham Squadron	New Orleans Pelicans	
Lester Quiñones^{†}	October 24	Santa Cruz Warriors	Golden State Warriors	
Brandon Rachal*	October 24	Long Island Nets	Brooklyn Nets	
Jerome Robinson*	October 24	Santa Cruz Warriors	Golden State Warriors	
Orlando Robinson	October 24	Sioux Falls Skyforce	Miami Heat	
Gui Santos	October 24	Santa Cruz Warriors	Golden State Warriors	
Javonte Smart	October 24	Birmingham Squadron	New Orleans Pelicans	
Justin Smith	October 24	Delaware Blue Coats	Philadelphia 76ers	
Pat Spencer	October 24	Santa Cruz Warriors	Golden State Warriors	
DJ Steward	October 24	Stockton Kings	Sacramento Kings	
D. J. Stewart Jr.	October 24	Sioux Falls Skyforce	Miami Heat	
Christian Vital	October 24	Raptors 905	Toronto Raptors	
Keaton Wallace	October 24	Ontario Clippers	Los Angeles Clippers	
Phillip Wheeler	October 24	Iowa Wolves	Minnesota Timberwolves	
Bryson Williams	October 24	Ontario Clippers	Los Angeles Clippers	
Donovan Williams	October 24	Long Island Nets	Brooklyn Nets	
Jeenathan Williams	October 24	Salt Lake City Stars	Utah Jazz	
Trevion Williams	October 24	Santa Cruz Warriors	Golden State Warriors	
Lucas Williamson	October 24	Ontario Clippers	Los Angeles Clippers	
Marcus Zegarowski*	October 24	Long Island Nets	Brooklyn Nets	
Stephen Zimmerman	October 24	Austin Spurs	San Antonio Spurs	
Adonis Arms	October 25	Grand Rapids Gold	Phoenix Suns	
Joël Ayayi	October 25	Lakeland Magic	Orlando Magic	
Aleem Ford	October 25	Lakeland Magic	Orlando Magic	
Abdul Gaddy	October 25	Oklahoma City Blue	Oklahoma City Thunder	
Grant Golden	October 25	Grand Rapids Gold	Denver Nuggets	
Kellan Grady	October 25	Grand Rapids Gold	Denver Nuggets	
Scotty Hopson	October 25	Oklahoma City Blue	Oklahoma City Thunder	
Drake Jeffries	October 25	Lakeland Magic	Orlando Magic	
Sacha Killeya-Jones	October 25	Oklahoma City Blue	Oklahoma City Thunder	
Adam Mokoka	October 25	Oklahoma City Blue	Oklahoma City Thunder	
Alex Morales	October 25	Lakeland Magic	Orlando Magic	
Jahmi'us Ramsey	October 25	Oklahoma City Blue	Oklahoma City Thunder	
Chasson Randle	October 25	Grand Rapids Gold	Denver Nuggets	
Jay Scrubb	October 25	Lakeland Magic	Orlando Magic	
Jaden Shackelford	October 25	Oklahoma City Blue	Oklahoma City Thunder	
Simisola Shittu	October 25	Lakeland Magic	Orlando Magic	
Zavier Simpson	October 25	Lakeland Magic	Orlando Magic	
Justin Tillman	October 25	Grand Rapids Gold	Denver Nuggets	
D. J. Wilson	October 25	Oklahoma City Blue	Toronto Raptors	
Robert Woodard II	October 25	Oklahoma City Blue	Oklahoma City Thunder	
Jules Bernard	October 26	Motor City Cruise	Detroit Pistons	
Devontae Cacok	October 26	Motor City Cruise	Detroit Pistons	
Kyler Edwards	October 26	Motor City Cruise	Detroit Pistons	
Jordan Hall	October 26	Austin Spurs	San Antonio Spurs	
Keifer Sykes	October 26	Motor City Cruise	Detroit Pistons	
Stanley Umude	October 26	Motor City Cruise	Detroit Pistons	
Jared Butler	November 3	Grand Rapids Gold	Utah Jazz	
RJ Nembhard	November 9	Motor City Cruise	Cleveland Cavaliers	
Langston Galloway	November 13	College Park Skyhawks	Indiana Pacers	
Jordan Schakel*^{†}	November 23	Capital City Go-Go	Washington Wizards	
Orlando Robinson*^{†}	November 25	Sioux Falls Skyforce	Miami Heat	
Feron Hunt*^{†}	November 30	Westchester Knicks	New York Knicks	
Jordan Hall*	December 1	Austin Spurs	San Antonio Spurs	
Michael Foster Jr.*^{†}	December 5	Delaware Blue Coats	Philadelphia 76ers	
Stanley Johnson	December 8	Sioux Falls Skyforce	Utah Jazz	
Trey Burke	December 9	Stockton Kings	Oklahoma City Thunder	
A. J. Lawson^{†}	December 10	College Park Skyhawks	Minnesota Timberwolves	
Dru Smith*^{†}	December 14	Sioux Falls Skyforce	Miami Heat	
Alize Johnson*	December 15	Austin Spurs	San Antonio Spurs	
Sterling Brown	December 17	Raptors 905	Oklahoma City Thunder	
David Nwaba	December 18	Lakeland Magic	Oklahoma City Thunder	
Saben Lee^{†}	December 28	Raptors 905	Philadelphia 76ers	
Braxton Key*^{†}	January 1	Delaware Blue Coats	Detroit Pistons	
Tyler Dorsey*^{†}	January 7	Texas Legends	Dallas Mavericks	
Olivier Sarr*	January 11	Oklahoma City Blue	Portland Trail Blazers	
Justin Champagnie	January 12	Sioux Falls Skyforce	Toronto Raptors	
Alondes Williams*^{†}	January 18	Long Island Nets	Brooklyn Nets	
Devon Dotson*^{†}	January 19	Capital City Go-Go	Washington Wizards	
Josh Jackson	January 25	Stockton Kings	Toronto Raptors	
Jarrett Culver*^{†}	January 26	College Park Skyhawks	Atlanta Hawks	
PJ Dozier*	January 29	Iowa Wolves	Sacramento Kings	
André Roberson	February 1	Oklahoma City Blue	Brooklyn Nets	
Tony Snell	February 1	Maine Celtics	New Orleans Pelicans	
Deonte Burton*	February 8	Stockton Kings	Sacramento Kings	
Elfrid Payton	February 8	Fort Wayne Mad Ants	Phoenix Suns	
Stanley Umude*	February 20	Motor City Cruise	Detroit Pistons	
Nate Darling*	February 23	Ontario Clippers	Los Angeles Clippers	
Justin Jackson*	February 23	Texas Legends	Oklahoma City Thunder	
Malcolm Hill*	February 27	Birmingham Squadron	Chicago Bulls	
Greg Brown III*	March 2	Ontario Clippers	Portland Trail Blazers	
Keaton Wallace*	March 4	Ontario Clippers	Los Angeles Clippers	
Trevor Keels*	March 5	Westchester Knicks	New York Knicks	
Lester Quiñones*	March 12	Santa Cruz Warriors	Golden State Warriors	
Izaiah Brockington	March 14	Birmingham Squadron	New Orleans Pelicans	
Willie Cauley-Stein*	March 18	Rio Grande Valley Vipers	Houston Rockets	

=== Going abroad ===
The following players were on NBA rosters during the previous season, but chose to sign with abroad teams after their contract expired and they became free agents. The players became free agents at the end of the season unless noted otherwise. The list also includes unsigned 2022 draft picks who signed with overseas teams, but excludes unsigned 2021 draft picks who were already playing overseas before the draft.

*	Denotes international players who returned to their home country
	Denotes players whose NBA contract status is unsigned draft pick

Player	Date signed	New team	New country	Former NBA team	Ref
Tomáš Satoranský	June 20	FC Barcelona	Spain	Washington Wizards	
Arnoldas Kulboka	July 6	Promitheas Patras	Greece	Charlotte Hornets	
Gabriele Procida	July 8	Alba Berlin	Germany	Detroit Pistons	
Markus Howard	July 16	Cazoo Baskonia	Spain	Denver Nuggets	
Gabriel Lundberg	July 21	Virtus Segafredo Bologna	Italy	Phoenix Suns	
Kyle Guy	July 22	Joventut Badalona	Spain	Miami Heat	
Karlo Matković	July 23	Cedevita Olimpija	Slovenia	New Orleans Pelicans	
Ignas Brazdeikis*	July 25	Žalgiris Kaunas	Lithuania	Orlando Magic	
Georgios Kalaitzakis*	July 25	Panathinaikos	Greece	Oklahoma City Thunder	
Semi Ojeleye	July 27	Virtus Segafredo Bologna	Italy	Los Angeles Clippers	
Yves Pons*	July 27	LDLC ASVEL	France	Memphis Grizzlies	
Myles Powell	July 27	Bay Area Dragons	Hong Kong	Philadelphia 76ers	
Aron Baynes*	July 28	Brisbane Bullets	Australia	Toronto Raptors	
Matteo Spagnolo	July 28	Dolomiti Energia Trento	Italy	Minnesota Timberwolves	
Cassius Winston	July 28	Bayern Munich	Germany	Washington Wizards	
Moses Wright	July 29	Zhejiang Lions	China	Dallas Mavericks	
Tyler Johnson	July 30	Brisbane Bullets	Australia	San Antonio Spurs	
Carsen Edwards	July 31	Fenerbahçe Beko	Turkey	Detroit Pistons	
Nemanja Bjelica	August 2	Fenerbahçe Beko	Turkey	Golden State Warriors	
Rayjon Tucker	August 2	Melbourne United	Australia	Milwaukee Bucks	
Justin Robinson	August 10	Illawarra Hawks	Australia	Detroit Pistons	
Hugo Besson	August 13	Metropolitans 92	France	Milwaukee Bucks	
Jaylen Hoard	August 14	Hapoel Tel Aviv	Israel	Oklahoma City Thunder	
Ismaël Kamagate	August 17	Paris Basketball	France	Denver Nuggets	
Isaac Bonga*	August 19	Bayern Munich	Germany	Toronto Raptors	
Tim Frazier	August 25	AEK Athens	Greece	Cleveland Cavaliers	
Jared Harper	September 7	Valencia Basket	Spain	New Orleans Pelicans	
Luca Vildoza	October 13	KK Crvena zvezda mts	Serbia	Milwaukee Bucks	
Dwayne Bacon	October 21	Panathinaikos	Greece	Los Angeles Lakers	
Mike Scott	October 23	SLUC Nancy Basket	France	Philadelphia 76ers	
Pierriá Henry	October 25	Cazoo Baskonia	Spain	Houston Rockets	
Eric Bledsoe	October 27	Shanghai Sharks	China	Portland Trail Blazers	
Dwight Howard	November 7	Taoyuan Leopards	Taiwan	Los Angeles Lakers	
Jake Layman	November 9	Baxi Manresa	Spain	Boston Celtics	
Miye Oni	November 16	London Lions	United Kingdom	New Orleans Pelicans	
Timothé Luwawu-Cabarrot	November 18	EA7 Emporio Armani Milan	Italy	Phoenix Suns	
Greg Monroe	December 7	Shanxi Loongs	China	Minnesota Timberwolves	
Quinn Cook	December 11	Zhejiang Lions	China	Sacramento Kings	
Quinndary Weatherspoon	December 12	Tianjin Pioneers	China	Golden State Warriors	
Facundo Campazzo	December 17	KK Crvena zvezda mts	Serbia	Dallas Mavericks	
Kostas Antetokounmpo	December 18	Fenerbahçe Beko	Turkey	Chicago Bulls	
Keljin Blevins	December 25	CS Rapid București	Romania	Portland Trail Blazers	
Chima Moneke	January 14	AS Monaco Basket	France	Sacramento Kings	
Thabo Sefolosha*	January 26	Vevey Riviera Basket	Switzerland	Houston Rockets	
Matt Thomas	January 29	Panathinaikos	Greece	Chicago Bulls	
Ben McLemore	February 1	Shandong Hi-Speed Kirin	China	Portland Trail Blazers	
Ed Davis	February 6	Mets de Guaynabo	Puerto Rico	Cleveland Cavaliers	
Leandro Bolmaro	March 2	Lenovo Tenerife	Spain	Utah Jazz	
Eric Paschall	March 7	Leones de Ponce	Puerto Rico	Minnesota Timberwolves	
Brandon Knight	March 15	Piratas de Quebradillas	Puerto Rico	Dallas Mavericks	
Hassan Whiteside	March 15	Piratas de Quebradillas	Puerto Rico	Utah Jazz	
DeMarcus Cousins	April 11	Mets de Guaynabo	Puerto Rico	Denver Nuggets	
Lance Stephenson	April 29	Leones de Ponce	Puerto Rico	Indiana Pacers	
Matthew Dellavedova*	May 17	Melbourne United	Australia	Sacramento Kings	

=== Waived ===
	Denotes player who did not clear waivers because his contract was claimed by another team
^{†}	Denotes players who were on a two-way contract
	Denotes players whose contracts were voided

Player	date Waived	Former Team	Ref
John Wall	June 28	Houston Rockets	
Juancho Hernangómez	June 30	Utah Jazz	
Tyrell Terry^{†}	July 2	Memphis Grizzlies	
Isaiah Roby	July 3	Oklahoma City Thunder	
Rayjon Tucker	July 5	Milwaukee Bucks	
Luca Vildoza	July 5	Milwaukee Bucks	
Eric Bledsoe	July 6	Portland Trail Blazers	
Danilo Gallinari	July 8	San Antonio Spurs	
Taj Gibson	July 8	New York Knicks	
Malik Fitts	July 14	Indiana Pacers	
Juwan Morgan	July 14	Indiana Pacers	
Nik Stauskas	July 14	Indiana Pacers	
Duane Washington Jr.	July 14	Indiana Pacers	
Mychal Mulder^{†}	July 16	Miami Heat	
Javonte Smart^{†}	July 16	Miami Heat	
JaMychal Green	July 20	Oklahoma City Thunder	
Sharife Cooper^{†}	July 25	Atlanta Hawks	
Jay Scrubb	July 27	Los Angeles Clippers	
Armoni Brooks	July 30	Toronto Raptors	
Rayjon Tucker	August 2	Milwaukee Bucks	
Didi Louzada	August 29	Portland Trail Blazers	
Sviatoslav Mykhailiuk	August 29	Toronto Raptors	
Norvel Pelle	September 4	Portland Trail Blazers	
Chaundee Brown Jr.^{†}	September 11	Atlanta Hawks	
DJ Steward	September 12	Sacramento Kings	
Micah Potter	September 14	Detroit Pistons	
Paris Bass	September 16	Utah Jazz	
Rob Edwards	September 16	Milwaukee Bucks	
Xavier Sneed^{†}	September 16	Utah Jazz	
Keifer Sykes	September 16	Detroit Pistons	
Alex Antetokounmpo	September 17	Milwaukee Bucks	
Marcus Zegarowski	September 17	Brooklyn Nets	
Iverson Molinar	September 19	Milwaukee Bucks	
Ibou Badji	September 20	Milwaukee Bucks	
Bruno Caboclo	September 20	Boston Celtics	
Chandler Vaudrin	September 20	Cleveland Cavaliers	
Bennie Boatwright	September 22	Indiana Pacers	
RaiQuan Gray	September 22	Brooklyn Nets	
Dusty Hannahs	September 22	Golden State Warriors	
David Stockton	September 22	Indiana Pacers	
Gabe York	September 22	Indiana Pacers	
Eric Paschall^{†}	October 19	Minnesota Timberwolves	
Jordan Hall^{†}	October 24	San Antonio Spurs	
Joshua Primo	October 28	San Antonio Spurs	
Dru Smith^{†}	November 13	Miami Heat	
Olivier Sarr^{†}	November 18	Portland Trail Blazers	
Jordan Schakel^{†}	November 20	Washington Wizards	
Michael Foster Jr.^{†}	November 23	Philadelphia 76ers	
Orlando Robinson^{†}	November 25	Miami Heat	
Facundo Campazzo	November 28	Dallas Mavericks	
Jordan Hall	November 29	San Antonio Spurs	
Feron Hunt^{†}	November 29	New York Knicks	
Matt Ryan	December 1	Los Angeles Lakers	
A. J. Lawson^{†}	December 8	Minnesota Timberwolves	
Dru Smith^{†}	December 11	Miami Heat	
Alize Johnson	December 13	San Antonio Spurs	
Kostas Antetokounmpo^{†}	December 16	Chicago Bulls	
Tyler Dorsey^{†}	December 26	Dallas Mavericks	
Saben Lee^{†}	December 26	Philadelphia 76ers	
Braxton Key^{†}	December 27	Detroit Pistons	
Justin Champagnie	December 29	Toronto Raptors	
Gorgui Dieng	January 5	San Antonio Spurs	
Noah Vonleh	January 5	San Antonio Spurs	
Chima Moneke	January 6	Sacramento Kings	
Kemba Walker	January 6	Dallas Mavericks	
Alondes Williams^{†}	January 12	Brooklyn Nets	
Jarrett Culver^{†}	January 14	Atlanta Hawks	
Devon Dotson^{†}	January 17	Washington Wizards	
Duane Washington Jr.^{†}	February 1	Phoenix Suns	
Deonte Burton	February 8	Sacramento Kings	
Goga Bitadze	February 9	Indiana Pacers	
Greg Brown III	February 9	Portland Trail Blazers	
Dewayne Dedmon	February 9	San Antonio Spurs	
Bryn Forbes	February 9	Minnesota Timberwolves	
James Johnson	February 9	Indiana Pacers	
Boban Marjanović	February 9	Houston Rockets	
Terry Taylor	February 9	Indiana Pacers	
Justin Jackson	February 10	Oklahoma City Thunder	
Serge Ibaka	February 11	Indiana Pacers	
Patrick Beverley	February 12	Orlando Magic	
Danny Green	February 12	Houston Rockets	
Reggie Jackson	February 12	Charlotte Hornets	
Stanley Johnson	February 12	San Antonio Spurs	
Terrence Ross	February 12	Orlando Magic	
John Wall	February 12	Houston Rockets	
Justin Holiday	February 13	Houston Rockets	
Julian Champagnie^{†}	February 14	Philadelphia 76ers	
Leandro Bolmaro	February 16	Utah Jazz	
Moses Brown^{†}	February 17	Los Angeles Clippers	
Kevin Love	February 18	Cleveland Cavaliers	
Russell Westbrook	February 20	Utah Jazz	
Will Barton	February 21	Washington Wizards	
Tony Bradley	February 21	Chicago Bulls	
Nate Darling^{†}	February 21	Los Angeles Clippers	
R. J. Hampton	February 21	Orlando Magic	
Malcolm Hill^{†}	February 21	Chicago Bulls	
KZ Okpala	February 25	Sacramento Kings	
Eugene Omoruyi	February 26	Oklahoma City Thunder	
Goran Dragić	February 28	Chicago Bulls	
Juancho Hernangómez	February 28	Toronto Raptors	
Nerlens Noel	February 28	Detroit Pistons	
Vernon Carey Jr.	March 1	Washington Wizards	
Sandro Mamukelashvili^{†}	March 1	Milwaukee Bucks	
Keaton Wallace^{†}	March 1	Los Angeles Clippers	
Isaiah Roby	March 3	San Antonio Spurs	
Moses Brown^{†}	March 12	New York Knicks	
Trevelin Queen^{†}	March 29	Indiana Pacers	
Ryan Arcidiacono	April 1	Portland Trail Blazers	
Dereon Seabron^{†}	April 6	New Orleans Pelicans	
Kennedy Chandler	April 8	Memphis Grizzlies	
Davon Reed	April 9	Los Angeles Lakers	
Jay Scrubb^{†}	June 5	Orlando Magic	

==== Training camp cuts ====
All players listed did not make the final roster.
^{†} On a two-way contract.
^{©} Claimed off waivers by another team.

Atlanta Hawks	Boston Celtics	Brooklyn Nets	Charlotte Hornets	Chicago Bulls
Armoni Brooks; Malik Ellison; Tyson Etienne; Jared Rhoden; Chris Silva	Eric Demers; Reginald Kissoonlal; Jake Layman; A. J. Reeves; Luka Šamanić; Marial Shayok; Brodric Thomas; Denzel Valentine	Chris Chiozza; Kaiser Gates; RaiQuan Gray; Noah Kirkwood; Brandon Rachal; Donovan Williams; Marcus Zegarowski	Ty-Shon Alexander; LiAngelo Ball; Jalen Crutcher; Anthony Duruji; Jaylen Sims; Xavier Sneed; Isaiah Whaley	Henri Drell; Javon Freeman-Liberty; Carlik Jones; Justin Lewis; Ethan Thompson; Okaro White
Cleveland Cavaliers	Dallas Mavericks	Denver Nuggets	Detroit Pistons	Golden State Warriors
Sharife Cooper; Mamadi Diakite; Nate Hinton; Didi Louzada; RJ Nembhard; Jamorko Pickett	Marcus Bingham Jr.; Mouhamadou Gueye; Tyler Hall; Grant Riller; D.J. Stewart Jr.	Adonis Arms; Grant Golden; Grant Golden; Kellan Grady; Chasson Randle; Justin Tillman	Jules Bernard; Devontae Cacok; Kyler Edwards; Stanley Umude; Kemba Walker	Mac McClung; Lester Quiñones; Jerome Robinson; Pat Spencer; Quinndary Weatherspoon; Trevion Williams
Houston Rockets	Indiana Pacers	Los Angeles Clippers	Los Angeles Lakers	Memphis Grizzlies
Willie Cauley-Stein; Derrick Favors; Maurice Harkless; Pierriá Henry; Ty Jerome; Théo Maledon; Trhae Mitchell	Justin Anderson; Eli Brooks; Tevin Brown; Langston Galloway; Norvel Pelle; Jermaine Samuels; Deividas Sirvydis	Nate Darling; Michael Devoe; Malik Fitts; Xavier Moon; Juwan Morgan; Keaton Wallace; Bryson Williams; Lucas Williamson	Dwayne Bacon; L. J. Figueroa; Bryce Hamilton; Shaquille Harrison; Jay Huff; Javante McCoy; Nate Pierre-Louis; Fabian White Jr.	Justin Bean; Jacob Gilyard; Matthew Hurt; Dakota Mathias; Sean McDermott; EJ Onu; Killian Tillie; Romeo Weems
Miami Heat	Milwaukee Bucks	Minnesota Timberwolves	New Orleans Pelicans	New York Knicks
Jamaree Bouyea; Darius Days^{©}; Jon Elmore; Marcus Garrett; Mychal Mulder; Orlando Robinson; D. J. Stewart Jr.	Marques Bolden; Elijah Hughes; Jontay Porter; Luca Vildoza; Lindell Wigginton	PJ Dozier; C. J. Elleby; A. J. Lawson; Matt Lewis; Emmanuel Mudiay; Phillip Wheeler	Izaiah Brockington^{†}; John Butler; Zylan Cheatham; Kelan Martin; John Petty Jr.; Daeqwon Plowden; Javonte Smart	James Akinjo; Garrison Brooks; Jalen Harris; DaQuan Jeffries; Nuni Omot; Quinton Rose; M.J. Walker
Oklahoma City Thunder	Orlando Magic	Philadelphia 76ers	Phoenix Suns	Portland Trail Blazers
Sterling Brown; Trey Burke; Marquese Chriss; Abdul Gaddy; Scotty Hopson; Sacha Killeya-Jones; Adam Mokoka; David Nwaba; Jahmi'us Ramsey; Jaden Shackelford; Robert Woodard II	Joël Ayayi; Devin Cannady; Aleem Ford; Drake Jeffries; Alex Morales; Jay Scrubb; Simisola Shittu; Zavier Simpson	Charles Bassey; Charlie Brown Jr.; Sekou Doumbouya; Isaiah Joe; Skylar Mays; Patrick McCaw; Mac McClung; Aminu Mohammed; Trevelin Queen; Justin Smith	Adonis Arms; Frank Jackson; Saben Lee; Timothé Luwawu-Cabarrot	Devontae Cacok; Wes Iwundu; Isaiah Miller; Jared Rhoden; Brandon Williams
Sacramento Kings	San Antonio Spurs	Toronto Raptors	Utah Jazz	Washington Wizards
Kent Bazemore; Quinn Cook; Jordan Ford; Jeriah Horne; Wes Iwundu; Sam Merrill; Alex O'Connell	Jalen Adaway; Chaundee Brown Jr.; Alize Johnson; Tommy Kuhse; Joe Wieskamp; Stephen Zimmerman	Gabe Brown; Ryan Hawkins; Josh Jackson; David Johnson; Saben Lee; Reggie Perry; Christian Vital; D. J. Wilson	Jared Butler; Tyler Cook; Frank Jackson; Stanley Johnson; Saben Lee; Isaiah Miller; Darryl Morsell; Jeenathan Williams; Cody Zeller	Devon Dotson; Jaime Echenique; Quenton Jackson; Makur Maker; Davion Mintz; Craig Sword

== Draft ==
The 2022 NBA draft was held on June 23, 2022, at Barclays Center in Brooklyn, New York. In two rounds of draft, 58 amateur United States college basketball players and other eligible players, including international players, was selected. The following players signed a regular rookie contract unless noted otherwise.

Denotes players who signed two-way contract
Denotes players whose NBA two-way contract was upgraded to standard NBA contract
Denotes players who are expected to play overseas

=== First round ===
Pick	Player	Date signed	Team (Note: Team denotes the team that holds the players' draft rights at the time of contract signing. Teams in parentheses denotes the teams that drafted the players before any trade occurred)	Ref
1	Paolo Banchero	July 1	Orlando Magic	
2	Chet Holmgren	July 1	Oklahoma City Thunder	
3	Jabari Smith Jr.	July 1	Houston Rockets	
4	Keegan Murray	July 2	Sacramento Kings	
5	Jaden Ivey	July 2	Detroit Pistons	
6	Bennedict Mathurin	July 3	Indiana Pacers	
7	Shaedon Sharpe	July 1	Portland Trail Blazers	
8	Dyson Daniels	July 8	New Orleans Pelicans	
9	Jeremy Sochan	July 8	San Antonio Spurs	
10	Johnny Davis	July 1	Washington Wizards	
11	Ousmane Dieng	July 5	Oklahoma City Thunder (rights acquired from New York)	
12	Jalen Williams	July 1	Oklahoma City Thunder	
13	Jalen Duren	July 7	Detroit Pistons (rights acquired from Charlotte via New York)	
14	Ochai Agbaji	July 2	Cleveland Cavaliers	
15	Mark Williams	July 2	Charlotte Hornets	
16	AJ Griffin	July 3	Atlanta Hawks	
17	Tari Eason	July 1	Houston Rockets	
18	Dalen Terry	July 7	Chicago Bulls	
19	Jake LaRavia	July 1	Memphis Grizzlies (rights acquired from Minnesota)	
20	Malaki Branham	July 8	San Antonio Spurs	
21	Christian Braun	July 3	Denver Nuggets	
22	Walker Kessler	July 9	Utah Jazz (rights acquired from Memphis via Minnesota)	
23	David Roddy	July 1	Memphis Grizzlies (rights acquired from Philadelphia)	
24	MarJon Beauchamp	July 7	Milwaukee Bucks	
25	Blake Wesley	July 5	San Antonio Spurs	
26	Wendell Moore Jr.	July 7	Minnesota Timberwolves (rights acquired from Houston via Dallas)	
27	Nikola Jović	July 2	Miami Heat	
28	Patrick Baldwin Jr.	July 6	Golden State Warriors	
29	TyTy Washington	July 1	Houston Rockets (rights acquired from Minnesota via Memphis)	
30	Peyton Watson	July 3	Denver Nuggets (rights acquired from Oklahoma City)	

=== Second round ===
Pick	Player	Date signed	Team	Ref
31	Andrew Nembhard	July 22	Indiana Pacers	
32	Caleb Houstan	July 10	Orlando Magic	
33	Christian Koloko	August 26	Toronto Raptors	
34	Jaylin Williams	July 19	Oklahoma City Thunder	
35	Max Christie	July 8	Los Angeles Lakers	
36	Gabriele Procida	—	Detroit Pistons (rights acquired from Portland)	
37	Jaden Hardy	July 6	Dallas Mavericks (rights acquired from Sacramento)	
38	Kennedy Chandler	July 6	Memphis Grizzlies (rights acquired from San Antonio)	
39	Khalifa Diop	—	Cleveland Cavaliers	
40	Bryce McGowens	July 2	Charlotte Hornets (rights acquired from Minnesota)	
41	E. J. Liddell	October 16	New Orleans Pelicans	
42	Trevor Keels	July 10	New York Knicks	
43	Moussa Diabaté	July 22	Los Angeles Clippers	
44	Ryan Rollins	July 28	Golden State Warriors (rights acquired from Atlanta)	
45	Josh Minott	July 22	Minnesota Timberwolves (rights acquired from Charlotte)	
46	Ismaël Kamagate	—	Denver Nuggets (rights acquired from Detroit via Portland)	
47	Vince Williams Jr.	July 2	Memphis Grizzlies	
48	Kendall Brown	September 16	Indiana Pacers (rights acquired from Minnesota)	
49	Isaiah Mobley	July 2	Cleveland Cavaliers	
50	Matteo Spagnolo	—	Minnesota Timberwolves	
51	Tyrese Martin	July 15	Atlanta Hawks (rights acquired from Golden State)	
52	Karlo Matković	—	New Orleans Pelicans	
53	JD Davison	July 9	Boston Celtics	
Milwaukee Bucks (forfeited)
Miami Heat (forfeited)
54	Yannick Nzosa	—	Washington Wizards	
55	Gui Santos	—	Golden State Warriors	
56	Luke Travers	—	Cleveland Cavaliers	
57	Jabari Walker	July 13	Portland Trail Blazers	
58	Hugo Besson	—	Milwaukee Bucks (rights acquired from Indiana)	

=== Previous years' draftees ===
Draft	Pick	Player	Date signed	Team	Previous team	Ref
2021	49	Marcus Zegarowski	September 16	Brooklyn Nets	Long Island Nets (NBA G League)	
2021	59	RaiQuan Gray	September 22	Brooklyn Nets	Long Island Nets (NBA G League)	

=== Renounced draft rights ===
Draft	Pick	Player	Date of rights' renouncement	Former team	Ref
