= Adonis Arms =

American basketball player (born 1998)

No. 25 – Promitheas Patras
- Position: Small forward
- League: Greek Basketball League

Personal information
- Born: June 26, 1998 (age 28) Milwaukee, Wisconsin, U.S.
- Listed height: 6 ft 6 in (1.98 m)
- Listed weight: 205 lb (93 kg)

Career information
- High school: Desert Vista (Phoenix, Arizona)
- College: Mesa CC (2016–2018); Northwest Nazarene (2018–2019); Winthrop (2020–2021); Texas Tech (2021–2022)
- NBA draft: 2022: undrafted
- Playing career: 2022–present

Career history
- 2022–2023: Grand Rapids Gold
- 2023–2024: Memphis Hustle
- 2024: Guangdong Southern Tigers
- 2025–2026: AEK Athens
- 2026: Calgary Surge
- 2026–present: Promitheas Patras

Career highlights
- GNAC Player of the Year (2019); GNAC Newcomer of the Year (2019)
- Stats at NBA.com
- Stats at Basketball Reference

Adonis Arms (born June 26, 1998) is an American professional basketball player for the Promitheas Patras of the Greek Basketball League (GBL). He played college basketball for the Mesa CC Thunderbirds, Northwest Nazarene Nighthawks, Winthrop Eagles and Texas Tech Red Raiders.

== High school career ==
Arms was raised in Milwaukee, Wisconsin, and moved to Phoenix, Arizona, at the age of 12. He attended Desert Vista High School where he failed to make the varsity team during his freshman, sophomore and junior seasons. Arms made the varsity team as a senior and averaged 2.7 points, 1.6 rebounds and .5 assists in 17 games. He received no college offers out of high school.

Arms was noticed by the son of Mesa Community College coach Sam Ballard while playing at open gyms. Ballard scouted Arms in an LA Fitness gym at the encouragement of his son and offered him a scholarship.

== College career ==
Arms, who was 6 ft 1 in (1.85 m) when he began playing at Mesa CC, averaged 8.1 points per game as a freshman. He grew to 6 ft 4 in (1.93 m) as a sophomore and was selected to the all-conference team. He transferred to join the Northwest Nazarene Nighthawks in NCAA Division II and averaged 20.6 points, 5.4 rebounds and 3.3 assists as he was named the Great Northwest Athletic Conference Player of the Year during the 2018–19 season.

Arms transferred to the Winthrop Eagles in NCAA Division I after his junior season. He had to sit out the 2019–20 season due to NCAA transfer rules. Arms averaged 10.3 points per game in a reserve role for the team during the 2020–21 season.

Arms elected to transfer to the Texas Tech Red Raiders for his final season of college eligibility. He chose the program due to his connection with associate head coach Barret Peery who he had first met as a freshman at Mesa CC. Arms averaged 8.6 points, 4.4 rebounds and 2.8 assists per game during the 2021–22 season.

== Professional career ==
=== Grand Rapids Gold (2022–2023) ===
After going undrafted in the 2022 NBA draft, Arms played for the Denver Nuggets in the 2022 NBA Summer League. Arms was invited to join the Nuggets during their 2022 training camp, but was waived on October 10, 2022. One day later, he signed with the Phoenix Suns on a training camp deal, but was later waived after not appearing in any preseason games. On November 4, 2022, Arms was named on the roster of the Nuggets' NBA G League affiliate team, Grand Rapids Gold.

=== Memphis Hustle (2023–2024) ===
On February 25, 2023, Arms was traded to the Memphis Hustle.

In June 2023, Arms joined the Brooklyn Nets for the 2023 NBA Summer League. On October 18, 2023, he signed with the Memphis Grizzlies. However, he was waived three days later, prior to opening night and on October 30, he re-joined the Hustle.

In July 2024, Arms joined the Sacramento Kings for the 2024 NBA Summer League. On October 1, he signed with the New Orleans Pelicans. However, he was waived on October 11.

=== Guangdong Southern Tigers (2024) ===
On November 10, 2024, Arms signed with the Guangdong Southern Tigers of the Chinese Basketball Association.

=== AEK Athens (2025–2026) ===
On August 15, 2025, Arms signed a one-year deal with Greek club AEK Athens.

=== Calgary Surge (2026–present) ===
On February 25, 2026, Arms joined Ironi Kiryat Ata of the Israeli Basketball Premier League. He did not appear in a single game for the team, and later in the season he joined Calgary Surge of the Canadian Elite Basketball League.

== Career statistics ==
=== College ===
Year	Team	GP	GS	MPG	FG%	3P%	FT%	RPG	APG	SPG	BPG	PPG
2020–21	Winthrop	23	1	17.4	.407	.351	.732	4.7	1.7	.9	.3	10.5
2021–22	Texas Tech	37	25	25.8	.448	.308	.744	4.4	2.8	1.0	.4	8.6
Career		60	26	22.6	.431	.326	.738	4.5	2.4	.9	.3	9.3
