= Anthony Duruji =

American basketball player

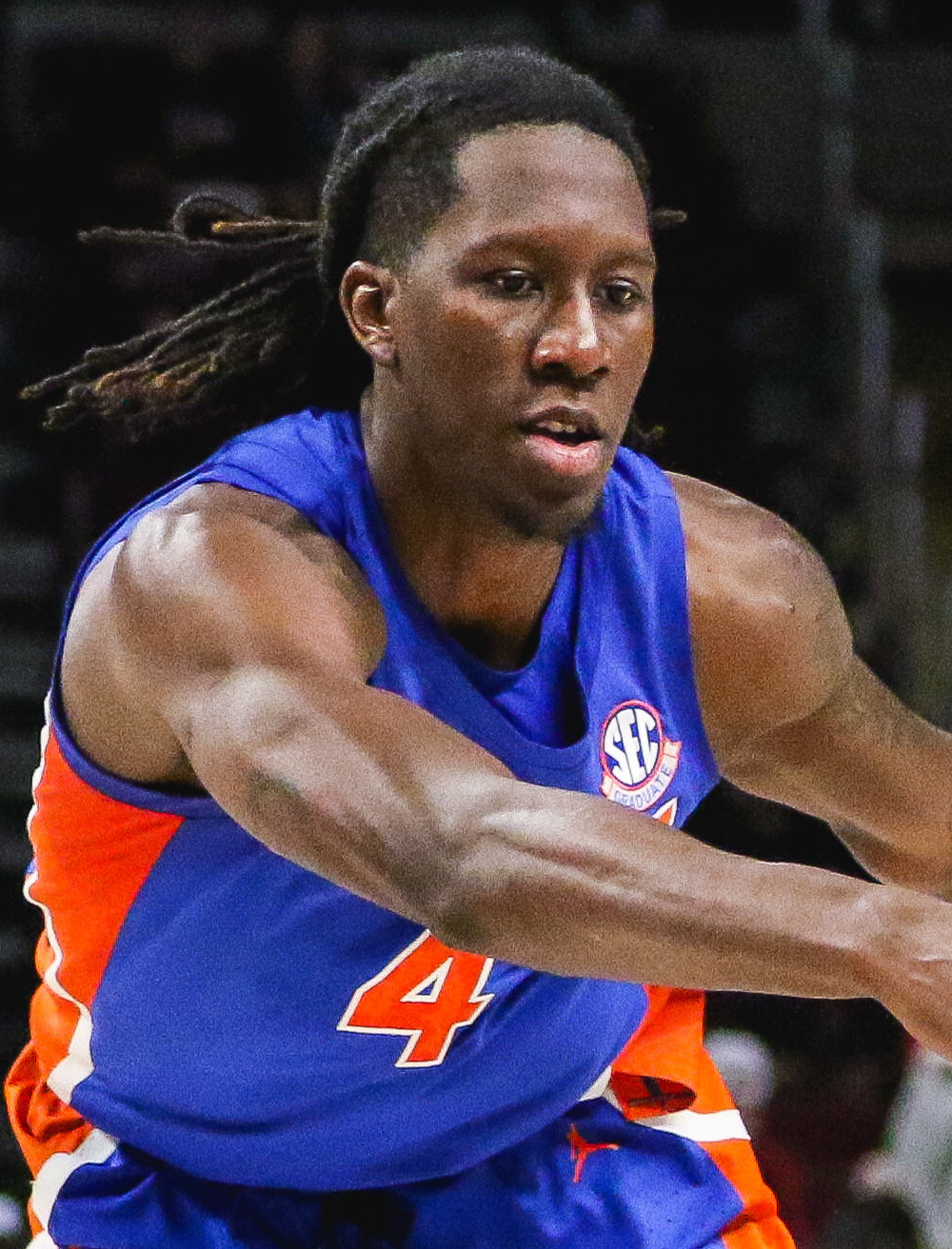
- Duruji with Florida in 2022

Free agent
- Position: Small forward / power forward

Personal information
- Born: July 22, 1998 (age 28) The Bronx, New York, U.S.
- Listed height: 6 ft 7 in (2.01 m)
- Listed weight: 209 lb (95 kg)

Career information
- High school: St. Andrew's Episcopal (Potomac, Maryland)
- College: Louisiana Tech (2017–2019); Florida (2020–2022)
- NBA draft: 2022: undrafted
- Playing career: 2022–present

Career history
- 2022–2023: Greensboro Swarm
- 2023–2024: Libertadores de Querétaro
- 2024: Rip City Remix
- 2024–2025: Saint-Chamond Basket

Career highlights
- Conference USA All-Freshman team (2018)
- Stats at NBA.com
- Stats at Basketball Reference

Anthony M. Duruji (born July 22, 1998) is an American professional basketball player who last played for Saint-Chamond Basket of the LNB Pro B. He played college basketball for the Louisiana Tech Bulldogs and the Florida Gators.

== High school career ==
Duruji is a native of Germantown, Maryland, and played basketball at St. Andrew's Episcopal School in Potomac, Maryland. He reached the 1,000 career points mark in three seasons. Duruji was a nationally ranked triple jumper but chose to focus on his basketball career. He competed in the American Family Insurance High School Slam Dunk competition in 2017 and finished in second place. Duruji was recruited especially by college programs near his hometown but chose to commit to Louisiana Tech University due to their coaching staff.

== College career ==
As a freshman for the Louisiana Tech Bulldogs, Duruji became known for his athleticism. He was selected to the Conference USA All-Freshman team in 2018. Duruji averaged 12.2 points and 6.2 rebounds during his sophomore season.

Duruji transferred to the Florida Gators and sat out the 2019–20 season. He became a valuable contributor for the Gators after they lost forward Keyontae Johnson early in the 2020–21 season. Duruji started 17 of 25 games and averaged 6.1 points and 4.4 rebounds per game. He started alongside Colin Castleton in the low post during the 2021–22 season and averaged 8.6 points and 4.1 rebounds per game.

On April 1, 2022, Duruji declared for the 2022 NBA draft to forgo his final season of college eligibility.

== Professional career ==
Duruji worked out for the Washington Wizards prior to the 2022 NBA draft but was not selected. He played with the Atlanta Hawks at the 2022 NBA Summer League.

On September 12, 2022, Duruji signed with the Charlotte Hornets. He appeared in two preseason games before he was waived on October 14, 2022. On November 4, 2022, Duruji was named to the opening night roster for the Greensboro Swarm.

Duruji returned to the Charlotte Hornets for the 2023 NBA Summer League. On September 23, 2023, he signed with the Libertadores de Querétaro of the Liga Nacional de Baloncesto Profesional.

On January 29, 2024, Duruji joined the Rip City Remix.

On July 30, 2024, Duruji signed with Saint-Chamond Basket of the LNB Pro B.

== Career statistics ==
Legend
GP	Games played	GS	Games started	MPG	Minutes per game
FG%	Field goal percentage	3P%	3-point field goal percentage	FT%	Free throw percentage
RPG	Rebounds per game	APG	Assists per game	SPG	Steals per game
BPG	Blocks per game	PPG	Points per game	**Bold**	Career high

=== College ===
Year	Team	GP	GS	MPG	FG%	3P%	FT%	RPG	APG	SPG	BPG	PPG
2017–18	Louisiana Tech	32	19	21.3	.451	**.394**	.597	4.1	.8	.4	**1.4**	7.2
2018–19	Louisiana Tech	**33**	**33**	**29.9**	.468	.339	.673	**6.2**	.9	**.9**	1.2	**12.2**
2019–20	Florida	Redshirt										
2020–21	Florida	25	17	22.0	.438	.263	.483	4.4	.6	.6	.4	6.1
2021–22	Florida	30	28	24.6	**.530**	.338	**.741**	4.1	**1.1**	**.9**	.5	8.6
Career		120	97	24.6	.472	.342	.649	4.7	.9	.7	.9	8.7

== Personal life ==
Duruji is the son of Esther Obioha who participated in track, high jump and javelin for her home country of Nigeria.
