= Jordan Hall (basketball) =

American basketball player

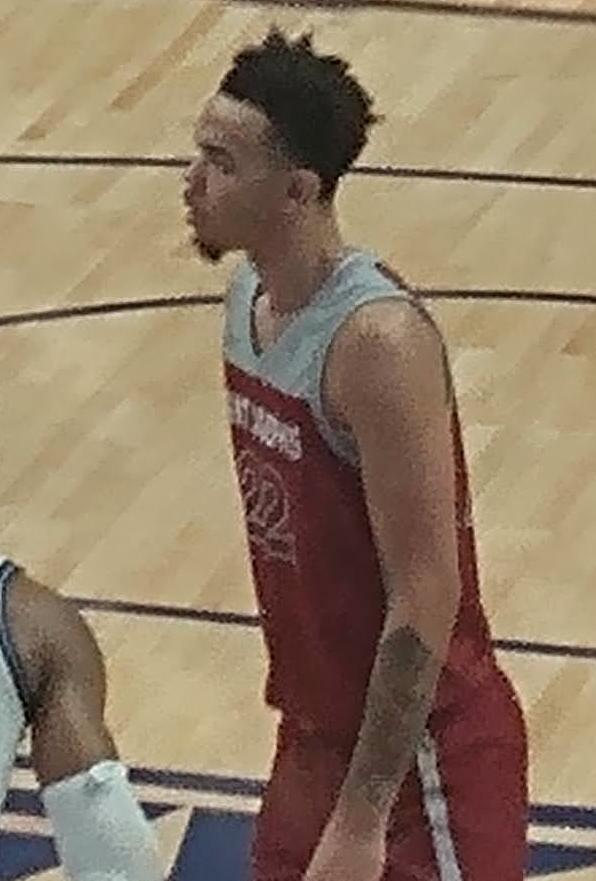
- Hall with Saint Joseph's in 2021

No. 17 – MKS Dąbrowa Górnicza
- Position: Shooting guard / small forward
- League: PLK

Personal information
- Born: January 14, 2002 (age 24) Wildwood, New Jersey, U.S.
- Listed height: 6 ft 7 in (2.01 m)
- Listed weight: 215 lb (98 kg)

Career information
- High school: Middle Township (Cape May Court House, New Jersey); Cardinal O'Hara (Springfield, Pennsylvania); Neumann-Goretti (Philadelphia, Pennsylvania)
- College: Saint Joseph's (2020–2022)
- NBA draft: 2022: undrafted
- Playing career: 2022–present

Career history
- 2022: San Antonio Spurs
- 2022–2023: Austin Spurs
- 2023–2024: Long Island Nets
- 2024: Napoli
- 2024: Windy City Bulls
- 2025–2026: Texas Legends
- 2026–present: Dąbrowa Górnicza

Career highlights
- Atlantic 10 All-Rookie Team (2021)
- Stats at NBA.com
- Stats at Basketball Reference

Jordan Davante Hall (born January 14, 2002) is an American professional basketball player for MKS Dąbrowa Górnicza of the Polish Basketball League (PLK). He played college basketball for the Saint Joseph's Hawks. Hall has played in nine NBA games for the San Antonio Spurs.

== High school career ==
Raised in North Wildwood, New Jersey, Hall played basketball for Middle Township High School in Cape May Court House, New Jersey as a freshman before transferring to Cardinal O'Hara High School in Springfield, Pennsylvania. Entering his junior year, he moved to Saints John Neumann and Maria Goretti Catholic High School in Philadelphia, Pennsylvania. As a senior, Hall led his team to a Philadelphia Catholic League title and was named Catholic League Player of the Year. He was a First Team Class 3A All-State selection. Hall committed to playing college basketball for Saint Joseph's over offers from La Salle and Bowling Green.

== College career ==
On February 20, 2021, Hall recorded a freshman season-high 22 points, 12 rebounds and 10 assists in a 91–82 overtime win over La Salle, the fourth triple-double in Saint Joseph's history. As a freshman, he averaged 10.6 points, 5.9 rebounds and 5.7 assists per game, earning Atlantic 10 All-Rookie Team honors. Hall led all NCAA Division I freshmen in assists. After the season, he left the program for personal reasons. Hall initially decided to transfer to Texas A&M and declare for the 2021 NBA draft while maintaining his college eligibility. However, on June 30 he announced he was withdrawing from the draft and returning to Saint Joseph's instead of transferring to Texas A&M. As a sophomore, Hall led Saint Joseph's in scoring with 14.1 points per game while also averaging 6.7 rebounds, 5.8 assists, and 1.2 steals per game. On March 18, 2022, he declared for the 2022 NBA draft, forgoing his remaining college eligibility.

== Professional career ==
=== San Antonio Spurs (2022) ===
After going undrafted in 2022 NBA draft, on August 11, 2022, Hall signed a two-way contract with the San Antonio Spurs. He was initially waived on October 24, without having played in a game, but later on November 2, the Spurs re-signed Hall. Hall made his NBA debut on the same day, coming off the bench and scoring three points, two assists and a rebound in a 100–143 loss to Toronto Raptors. On November 29, 2022, Hall was waived by the Spurs.

=== Austin Spurs (2022–2023) ===
On December 1, 2022, Hall signed with the Austin Spurs.

=== Long Island Nets (2023–2024) ===
On August 31, 2023, Hall's rights were traded to the Long Island Nets and on September 20, he signed with the Brooklyn Nets. However, they waived him on September 25. On October 28, he joined Long Island.

=== GeVi Napoli (2024) ===
On August 1, 2024, Hall signed with GeVi Napoli of the Lega Basket Serie A, but he got waived by the team on October 15 after just 3 games with the team.

=== Windy City Bulls (2024) ===
On November 7, 2024, Hall signed with the Windy City Bulls.

=== Texas Legends (2025–2026) ===
On March 14, 2025, Hall signed with the Texas Legends.

=== Santa Cruz Warriors (2026) ===
On March 20, 2026, Santa Cruz Warriors announced that they had signed Hall.

=== MKS Dąbrowa Górnicza (2026–present) ===
On August 23, 2026, he signed with MKS Dąbrowa Górnicza of the Polish Basketball League (PLK).

== Career statistics ==
Legend
GP	Games played	GS	Games started	MPG	Minutes per game
FG%	Field goal percentage	3P%	3-point field goal percentage	FT%	Free throw percentage
RPG	Rebounds per game	APG	Assists per game	SPG	Steals per game
BPG	Blocks per game	PPG	Points per game	**Bold**	Career high

=== NBA ===
Year	Team	GP	GS	MPG	FG%	3P%	FT%	RPG	APG	SPG	BPG	PPG
2022–23	San Antonio	9	0	9.2	.321	.200	.778	1.3	1.2	.1	.0	3.1
Career		9	0	9.2	.321	.200	.778	1.3	1.2	.1	.0	3.1

=== College ===
Year	Team	GP	GS	MPG	FG%	3P%	FT%	RPG	APG	SPG	BPG	PPG
2020–21	Saint Joseph's	20	18	31.9	.380	.351	**.760**	5.9	5.7	**1.3**	.1	10.6
2021–22	Saint Joseph's	**30**	**29**	**34.9**	**.393**	**.362**	.737	**6.7**	**5.8**	1.2	**.2**	**14.1**
Career		50	47	33.7	.389	.358	.748	6.3	5.7	1.2	.1	12.7
