= EJ Onu =

American basketball player

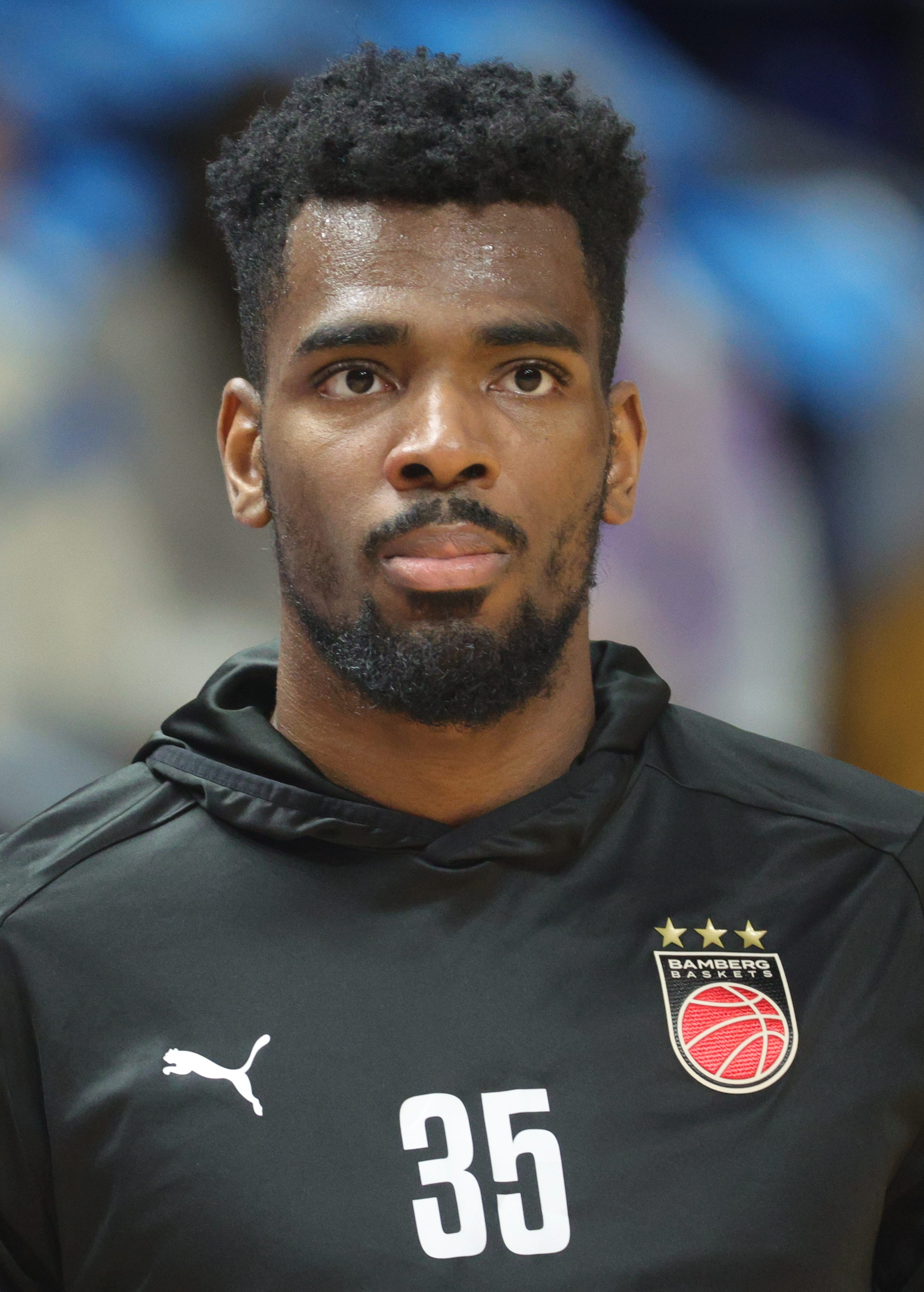
- EJ Onu in 2024

No. 35 – Gladiators Trier
- Position: Power forward / center
- League: Basketball Bundesliga

Personal information
- Born: July 31, 1999 (age 27) Cleveland, Ohio, U.S.
- Listed height: 6 ft 11 in (2.11 m)
- Listed weight: 240 lb (109 kg)

Career information
- High school: Richmond Heights (Richmond Heights, Ohio)
- College: Shawnee State (2017–2021)
- NBA draft: 2021: undrafted
- Playing career: 2021–present

Career history
- 2021–2022: Texas Legends
- 2022: Memphis Hustle
- 2022: Niagara River Lions
- 2022–2023: Memphis Hustle
- 2023: Santa Cruz Warriors
- 2023: Niagara River Lions
- 2023–2024: Brose Bamberg
- 2024: Río Breogán
- 2025: Legia Warsaw
- 2025–2026: Bamberg Baskets
- 2026–present: Gladiators Trier

Career highlights
- PLK champion (2025); CEBL Defensive Player of the Year (2022); German Bundesliga Best Defender (2026); 2× CEBL blocks leader (2022, 2023); NAIA champion (2021); First-team NAIA All-American (2021); MSC Player of the Year (2021); 2× First-team All-MSC (2020, 2021); Second-team All-MSC (2019); 3× MSC Defensive Player of the Year (2018, 2020, 2021); MSC Freshman of the Year (2018)
- Stats at NBA.com
- Stats at Basketball Reference

Ejiofor Johnson Onu (born July 31, 1999) is an American professional basketball player for Gladiators Trier of the Basketball Bundesliga (BBL). He played college basketball for the Shawnee State Bears.

== Early life ==
Born to Nigerian parents, Ejiofor Onu grew up near Cleveland, Ohio. He started playing basketball at age 14 and stood under 6 ft 3 in (1.91 m) as a high school freshman. Onu played for Richmond Heights High School in Richmond Heights, Ohio, earning Division IV All-Northeast Lake District honors from the Associated Press. He also ran track in high school.

== College career ==
During his freshman season at Shawnee State, Onu set a program single-game record with 11 blocks against the University of the Cumberlands. As a freshman, he averaged 9.4 points, 5.2 rebounds and a nation-leading 3.4 blocks per game, earning Mid-South Conference (MSC) Defensive Player of the Year and Freshman of the Year honors. He set a program single-season record for blocks. In his sophomore season, he averaged 12 points, 6.5 rebounds and 3.1 blocks per game. Onu was selected to the Second Team All-MSC.

As a junior, Onu averaged 11.7 points, 7.8 rebounds and a nation-leading 5.7 blocks per game. He was an Honorable Mention National Association of Intercollegiate Athletics (NAIA) All-American, First Team All-MSC and MSC Defensive Player of the Year. As a senior, Onu averaged 16.9 points, 8.1 rebounds and 4.5 blocks per game, earning First Team NAIA All-American, MSC Player of the Year and First Team All-MSC honors. For a third time, he was named MSC Defensive Player of the Year and led the nation in blocks. Onu became Shawnee State's all-time leader in blocks while ranking third in points and rebounds. He helped his team win an NAIA national championship. After the season, Onu declared for the 2021 NBA draft while maintaining his college eligibility and entering the transfer portal. On July 6, 2021, he announced that he was remaining in the draft.

== Professional career ==
=== Texas Legends (2021–2022) ===
After going undrafted in the 2021 NBA draft, Onu joined the Dallas Mavericks for the NBA Summer League. On August 21, 2021, the Mavericks announced that they had signed Onu, but was waived by the on September 4. He returned to Dallas on October 15, 2021, but was waived a day later. On October 23, he signed with the Texas Legends as an affiliate player. Onu was then later waived by the Legends on January 13, 2022.

=== Memphis Hustle (2022) ===
On January 14, 2022, Onu was acquired via available player pool by the Memphis Hustle. In 25 games, he averaged 5.96 points and 3.72 rebounds.

=== Niagara River Lions (2022) ===
On April 5, 2022, Onu signed with the Niagara River Lions of the Canadian Elite Basketball League. He was named the CEBL Defensive Player of the Year after averaging a league record 3.3 blocks per game, establishing Niagara as one of the best defensive teams in the league.

=== Return to Memphis (2022–2023) ===
Onu joined the Memphis Grizzlies for the 2022 NBA Summer League. On November 4, 2022, Onu was named to the opening night roster for the Memphis Hustle.

=== Santa Cruz Warriors (2023) ===
On January 22, 2023, Onu was traded to the Santa Cruz Warriors in exchange for Tremont Waters.

=== Return to the Niagara River Lions (2023) ===
On April 4, 2023, Onu returned to the Niagara River Lions.

=== Brose Bamberg (2023–2024) ===
On July 14, 2023, Onu signed with Brose Bamberg of the easyCredit BBL.

=== Río Breogán (2024–2025) ===
On June 29, 2024, he signed with Río Breogán of the Liga ACB. On January 1, 2025, it was announced that Onu and Breogán ended their cooperation.

=== Legia Warsaw (2025) ===
Onu signed a contract with Legia Warsaw of the Polish Basketball League (PLK).

=== Return to Bamberg (2025–2026) ===
On July 23, 2025, he signed with Bamberg Baskets in the Basketball Bundesliga (BBL) for a second stint.

=== Gladiators Trier (2026–present) ===
On June 20, 2026, he signed with Gladiators Trier of the Basketball Bundesliga (BBL).

== Career statistics ==
Legend
GP	Games played	GS	Games started	MPG	Minutes per game
FG%	Field goal percentage	3P%	3-point field goal percentage	FT%	Free throw percentage
RPG	Rebounds per game	APG	Assists per game	SPG	Steals per game
BPG	Blocks per game	PPG	Points per game	**Bold**	Career high

=== College ===
Year	Team	GP	GS	MPG	FG%	3P%	FT%	RPG	APG	SPG	BPG	PPG
2017–18	Shawnee State	30	30	–	.517	.256	.723	5.2	.4	.2	3.4	9.4
2018–19	Shawnee State	30	29	–	.570	.346	.728	6.5	.2	.2	3.1	12.0
2019–20	Shawnee State	32	32	**30.7**	.451	.270	.679	7.8	.4	.3	**5.7**	11.7
2020–21	Shawnee State	**33**	**33**	29.6	**.573**	**.400**	**.748**	**8.1**	**.5**	**.7**	4.5	**16.9**
Career		125	124	–	.528	.330	.721	6.9	.4	.3	4.2	12.6
