= Jeriah Horne =

American basketball player (born 1998)

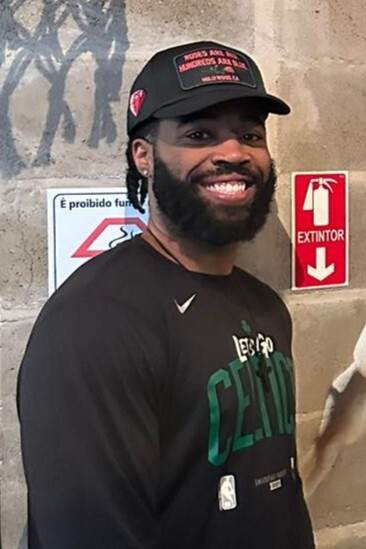

No. 41 – Élan Chalon
- Position: Small forward
- League: LNB Élite

Personal information
- Born: April 9, 1998 (age 28) Dayton, Ohio, U.S.
- Listed height: 6 ft 7 in (2.01 m)
- Listed weight: 220 lb (100 kg)

Career information
- High school: The Barstow School (Kansas City, Missouri)
- College: Nebraska (2016–2017); Tulsa (2018–2020); Colorado (2020–2021); Tulsa (2021–2022)
- NBA draft: 2022: undrafted
- Playing career: 2022–present

Career history
- 2022–2023: Stockton Kings
- 2023–2024: MKS Dąbrowa Górnicza
- 2024: Zastal Zielona Góra
- 2024–2025: Alba Fehérvár
- 2026: Shijiazhuang Xianglan
- 2026–present: Élan Chalon
- Stats at NBA.com
- Stats at Basketball Reference

Jeriah Jewel Horne (born April 9, 1998) is an American professional basketball player for Élan Chalon of the LNB Élite. He was a three-time first-team all-state selection in Missouri. In 2016, he shared the DiRenna Award for the top player in the Kansas City area, and he was also a finalist for Mr. Basketball in the state of Missouri.

== High school career ==
Horne is a 2016 graduate of The Barstow School in Kansas City, Missouri. He played basketball for the Barstow Knights, where he led the team to three consecutive Class 3 title games; bringing home the state championship in 2015. Horne scored more than 2,000 points during his prep career and Rivals.com ranked him the No. 122 player in the country.

== College career ==
During the 2016–17 season, Horne played 29 games for Nebraska Cornhuskers, with the average of 4.3 points and 1.9 rebounds per game. He upped his averages to 5.3 points and 2.2 rebounds per game during Big Ten play.

Between 2018 and 2020, he played 63 games for Tulsa Golden Hurricane (starting 23), with the average of 10.6 points and 5.0 rebounds over the two seasons. Horne scored in double-figures 33 times and led the team in 3-pointers both seasons.

As a senior in 2020–21, Horne led Colorado Buffaloes in rebounding at 5.8 per game, being the second in scoring at 10.8 points per contest and the third in steals (19). During the game vs. Arizona (2/6) he scored 10 points surpassing 1,000 points for his collegiate career.

He opted to return to Tulsa for an extra year of eligibility in 2020-21 due to the COVID-19 pandemic. During that season, he played all 94 games, starting in 53; with an average of 12.4 points and 5.6 rebounds; scoring in double-figures 60 times. On March 6, 2022, Horne made a buzzer-beating shot "from several steps shy of midcourt" to beat UCF.

== Professional career ==
For the 22–23 season, Horne signed with Stockton Kings of the NBA G League. During the next season (23–24), he played for MKS Dąbrowa Górnicza and Enea Zastal Zielona Góra, both in Poland.

On August 3, 2024, he signed with Alba Fehérvár of the Nemzeti Bajnokság I/A (NB1).

On September 18, 2026, he signed with Élan Chalon of the LNB Pro A.

== Personal life ==
Horne is the son of Tashannah and Jerrell Horne. His father played college ball at Memphis from 1992 to 1994 alongside Penny Hardaway. Jeriah has three brothers: Jonah, Jerrell and Octavious Ellis. Jeriah began playing basketball at age three. His favorite NBA player is LeBron James.

Horne earned a bachelor's degree in organization studies with a minor in sports management from Tulsa in 2020.

== Recognition ==
- 2016 - shared the DiRenna Award for the top player in the Kansas City area;
- 2016 - finalist for Mr. Basketball in the state of Missouri;
- 2017 - Tom Osborne Citizenship Team.
