= Seth Olsen =

American football player (born 1985)

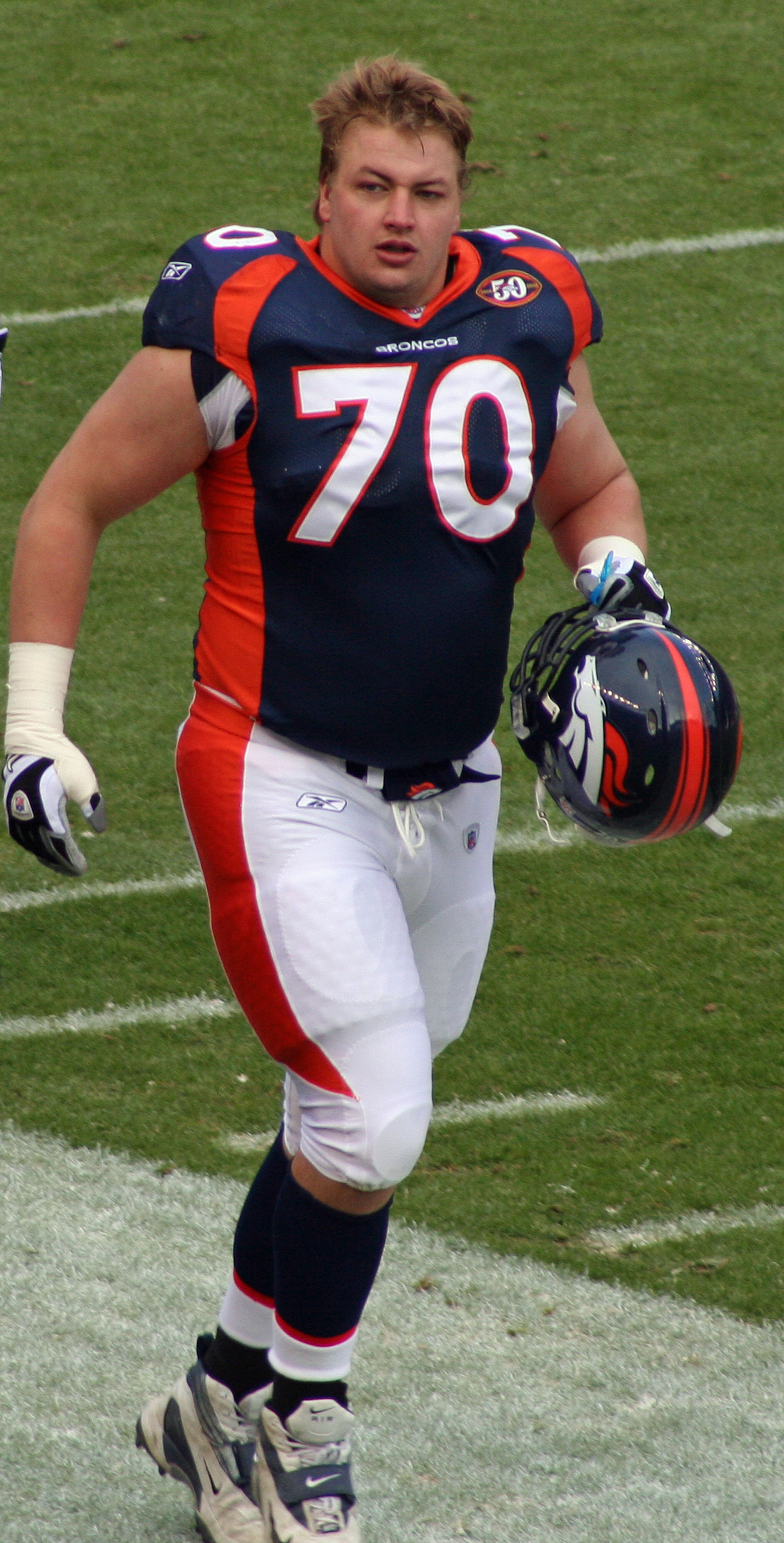
- Olsen with the Denver Broncos in 2010

No. 70, 73
- Position: Guard

Personal information
- Born: December 17, 1985 (age 40); Willmar, Minnesota, U.S.
- Listed height: 6 ft 5 in (1.96 m)
- Listed weight: 312 lb (142 kg)

Career information
- High school: Millard North (Omaha, Nebraska)
- College: Iowa
- NFL draft: 2009: 4th round, 132nd overall pick

Career history
- Denver Broncos (2009); Minnesota Vikings (2010–2011)*; Indianapolis Colts (2011–2012); Minnesota Vikings (2013)*
- * Offseason or practice squad member only

Awards and highlights
- First-team All-Big Ten (2008)

Career NFL statistics
- Games played: 14
- Games started: 5
- Stats at Pro Football Reference

Seth Olsen (born December 17, 1985) is an American former professional football player who was a guard in the National Football League (NFL). He played college football for the Iowa Hawkeyes. He was selected by the Denver Broncos in the fourth round of the 2009 NFL draft.

== Early life ==
He played for Millard North High School located in Omaha, Nebraska for head coach Fred Petito who also produced Heisman Trophy winner Eric Crouch. Olsen excelled on the football field and was a First-team All-Stater in his junior and senior seasons. He was also a High School Parade All-American. He led his team to three consecutive undefeated conference seasons and appeared in the State Championship game in his junior and senior seasons, winning the 2003 State Championship. Earned EA sports All-American status. Teammate at Iowa with former Millard North players Adam Shada and Jeff Tarpinian.

== College career ==
Olsen played four years for the University of Iowa after redshirting his freshman year. He played Right Guard. He earned First-team All-American Honors by Rivals.com. In his redshirt freshman season saw action in nearly every game and was named to the freshman all conference team. In his sophomore year saw action in first couple games before moving to right guard and starting every game after that. Named the Next man in Award on offense. Started every game at right guard in 2007 and was named All-Big 10 honorable mention. In his senior year in 2008 started every game at right guard and was named First-team All-American Honors by Rivals.com.

== Professional career ==
=== Denver Broncos ===
The Broncos selected Olsen in the fourth round (132nd overall) of the 2009 NFL draft. On July 23, 2009, Olsen signed a four-year, $2.615 million contract with a $414,120 signing bonus. His base salary was $310,000 in 2009, $395,000 in 2010, $480,000 in 2011, and $565,000 in 2012. Olsen was waived during final cuts on September 4, 2010.

=== Minnesota Vikings (first stint) ===
After being released by the Broncos, he was subsequently signed by the Minnesota Vikings to their practice squad. He was waived on September 10, 2011.

=== Indianapolis Colts ===
On September 12, he was claimed off waivers by the Indianapolis Colts. Olsen made his first start against the Tennessee Titans during week 8 of the 2011 NFL season at left guard.

=== Minnesota Vikings (second stint) ===
Olsen signed with the Vikings on March 19, 2013. Olsen was released from the Vikings after reaching an injury settlement on September 9, 2013.

== Personal life ==
He has been married to Christi Olsen since 2008. They have 3 children and reside in Arizona.
