= 2022–23 Loyola Ramblers men's basketball team =

American college basketball season

2022–23 Loyola Ramblers men's basketball
- Conference: Atlantic 10 Conference
- Record: 10–21 (4–14 A-10)
- Head coach: Drew Valentine (2nd season)
- Assistant coaches: Amorrow Morgan; Sean Dwyer; Patrick Wallace
- Home arena: Joseph J. Gentile Arena

2022–23 Atlantic 10 men's basketball standings
	Conf.				Overall
Team	W		L	PCT	W		L	PCT
VCU †	15	–	3	.833	27	–	8	.771
Fordham	12	–	6	.667	25	–	8	.758
Dayton	12	–	6	.667	22	–	12	.647
Saint Louis	12	–	6	.667	21	–	12	.636
George Mason	11	–	7	.611	20	–	13	.606
Duquesne	10	–	8	.556	20	–	13	.606
George Washington	10	–	8	.556	16	–	16	.500
Davidson	8	–	10	.444	16	–	16	.500
Saint Joseph's	8	–	10	.444	16	–	17	.485
St. Bonaventure	8	–	10	.444	14	–	18	.438
Richmond	7	–	11	.389	15	–	18	.455
La Salle	7	–	11	.389	15	–	19	.441
Massachusetts	6	–	12	.333	15	–	16	.484
Rhode Island	5	–	13	.278	9	–	22	.290
Loyola Chicago	4	–	14	.222	10	–	21	.323
† 2023 A10 tournament winner

The 2022–23 Loyola Ramblers men's basketball team represented Loyola University Chicago during the 2022–23 NCAA Division I men's basketball season. The Ramblers, led by second-year head coach Drew Valentine, played their home games at the Joseph J. Gentile Arena in Chicago, Illinois as first-year members of the Atlantic 10 Conference (A-10).

The Ramblers finished season 10–21, 4–14 in A-10 play, to finish in last place. They lost to Saint Joseph's in the first round of the A-10 tournament.

== Previous season ==
The Ramblers finished 2021–22 season 25–7, 13–5 in Missouri Valley Conference (MVC) play, to finish in a three-way tie for second place. As the No. 4 seed in the MVC tournament, they defeated Bradley, Northern Iowa and Drake to win the MVC tournament for the second consecutive season. As a result, they received the conference's automatic bid to the NCAA tournament as the No. 10 seed, where they lost in the first round to Ohio State.

On November 16, 2021, Loyola announced that the season would be the last season for the team in the Missouri Valley Conference as they would join the Atlantic 10 in July 2022.

== Offseason ==
=== Departures ===
Name	Number	Pos.	Height	Weight	Year	Hometown	Reason for departure
Lucas Williamson	1	G	6' 4"	205	Graduate student	Chicago, IL	Graduated
Ty Johnson	2	G	6' 3"	180	Freshman	Chicago, IL	Transferred to UC Davis
Keith Clemons	5	G	6' 1"	180	Graduate student	Norcross, GA	Graduated
Ryan Schwieger	13	F	6' 7"	205	Senior	Matthews, NC	Graduated
Chris Knight	23	F	6' 7"	225	Senior	Madison, WI	Graduated
Tate Hall	24	G/F	6' 6"	220	Graduate student	Greenfield, IN	Graduated
Aher Uguak	30	F	6' 7"	225	Graduate student	Edmonton, AB	Graduated
Damezi Anderson	35	F	6' 7"	225	Senior	South Bend, IN	Graduated
Will Alcock	45	F	6' 7"	215	Senior	Zionsville, IN	Graduated

=== Incoming transfers ===
Name	Number	Pos.	Height	Weight	Year	Hometown	Previous school
Sheldon Edwards	13	G	6' 4"	180	Junior	West Palm Beach, FL	Transferred from Valparaiso
Philip Alston	23	F	6' 6"	225	Junior	Columbus, OH	Transferred from California University of Pennsylvania
Jeameril Wilson	25	F	6' 7"	200	Graduate student	Chicago, IL	Transferred from Lehigh
Bryce Golden	35	C	6' 9"	245	Graduate student	Richmond, VA	Transferred from Butler

=== 2022 recruiting class ===
College recruiting information
Name	Hometown	School	Height	Weight	Commit date
Trey Lewis; G	Ferndale, MI	Ferndale (MI)	6 ft 6 in (1.98 m)	200 lb (91 kg)	Jul 13, 2021
Trey Lewis; G	Recruit ratings: 247Sports:				
Jayden Dawson; G	Omaha, NE	Omaha Central (NE)	6 ft 4 in (1.93 m)	185 lb (84 kg)	Jul 26, 2021
Jayden Dawson; G	Recruit ratings: 247Sports:				
Jalen Quinn; G	Tuscola, IL	Tuscola (IL)	6 ft 3 in (1.91 m)	185 lb (84 kg)	Aug 15, 2021
Jalen Quinn; G	Recruit ratings: 247Sports: ESPN: (N/R)				
Overall recruit ranking:
Note: In many cases, Scout, Rivals, 247Sports, On3, and ESPN may conflict in their listings of height and weight.; In these cases, the average was taken. ESPN grades are on a 100-point scale.; Sources: "2022 Loyola Ramblers Recruiting Class". ESPN.; "2022 Team Ranking". Rivals.

== Roster ==
2022–23 Loyola Ramblers men's basketball team
Players
Coaches

Pos.	#	Name	Height	Weight	Year	Previous school	Hometown
F	0	Saint Thomas	6 ft 7 in (2.01 m)	215 lb (98 kg)	So	Millard North	Omaha, NE
G	1	Jayden Dawson	6 ft 4 in (1.93 m)	185 lb (84 kg)	Fr	Omaha Central	Omaha, NE
G	2	Jalen Quinn	6 ft 3 in (1.91 m)	185 lb (84 kg)	Fr	Tuscola	Tuscola, IL
G	4	Braden Norris	6 ft 0 in (1.83 m)	180 lb (82 kg)	RS Sr	Hilliard Bradley; Oakland	Hilliard, OH
G	5	Trey Lewis	6 ft 6 in (1.98 m)	200 lb (91 kg)	Fr	Ferndale	Ferndale, MI
F	10	Tom Welch	6 ft 8 in (2.03 m)	220 lb (100 kg)	Sr	Naperville North	Naperville, IL
G	12	Marquise Kennedy	6 ft 1 in (1.85 m)	190 lb (86 kg)	Sr	Brother Rice	Chicago, IL
G	13	Sheldon Edwards	6 ft 4 in (1.93 m)	180 lb (82 kg)	Jr	TLAP Sports Academy; Valparaiso	West Palm Beach, FL
G	14	Caleb Reese (W)	5 ft 11 in (1.8 m)	160 lb (73 kg)	Fr	De La Salle	Warren, MI
C	22	Jacob Hutson	6 ft 11 in (2.11 m)	250 lb (113 kg)	Jr	Edina	Edina, MN
F	23	Philip Alston	6 ft 6 in (1.98 m)	225 lb (102 kg)	Jr	Westerville North; California (PA)	Columbus, OH
F	25	Jeameril Wilson	6 ft 7 in (2.01 m)	200 lb (91 kg)	GS	Woodstock Academy; Lehigh	Chicago, IL
G	31	Will Smythe (W)	6 ft 4 in (1.93 m)	170 lb (77 kg)	RS Fr	St. Mary's Prep	Rochester Hills, MI
F	32	Nolan Marold (W)	6 ft 8 in (2.03 m)	230 lb (104 kg)	Fr	Brewster Academy	Highlands Ranch, CO
G/F	33	Ben Schwieger	6 ft 7 in (2.01 m)	205 lb (93 kg)	RS Fr	Waubonsie Valley	Aurora, IL
C	35	Bryce Golden	6 ft 9 in (2.06 m)	245 lb (111 kg)	GS	St. James School; Butler	Richmond, VA

Head coach

- Drew Valentine (Oakland)

Assistant coach(es)

- Amorrow Morgan (Idaho State)
- Sean Dwyer (Michigan State)
- Patrick Wallace (Charleston Southern)

Legend

- (C) Team captain
- (S) Suspended
- (I) Ineligible
- (W) Walk-on
- Injured
- Current redshirt

Roster
Last update: December 8, 2025

== Schedule and results ==
Date time, TV	Rank^{#}	Opponent^{#}	Result	Record	Site (attendance) city, state
Exhibition
October 30, 2022*; 3:00 p.m.		Calumet	W 82–57		Gentile Arena (2,294); Chicago, IL
Regular season
November 7, 2022*; 7:00 p.m., NBCSCHI+		Fairleigh Dickinson	W 88–82 ^{OT}	1–0	Gentile Arena (3,609); Chicago, IL
November 11, 2022*; 7:00 p.m., ESPN+		at UIC	W 70–63	2–0	Credit Union 1 Arena (3,550); Chicago, IL
November 17, 2022*; 8:30 p.m., ESPNU		vs. Tulsa; Myrtle Beach Invitational Quarterfinals	L 66–85	2–1	HTC Center (1,143); Conway, SC
November 18, 2022*; 8:30 p.m., ESPN+		vs. Boise State; Myrtle Beach Invitational consolation 2nd round	L 48–70	2–2	HTC Center (1,312); Conway, SC
November 20, 2022*; 3:30 p.m., ESPN+		vs. No. 24 Texas A&M; Myrtle Beach Invitational 7th-place game	L 51–67	2–3	HTC Center (1,267); Conway, SC
November 25, 2022*; 1:00 p.m., ESPN+		at Harvard	L 55–61	2–4	Lavietes Pavilion (1,138); Allston, MA
November 30, 2022*; 8:00 p.m., NBCSCHI+		Central Arkansas	W 85–70	3–4	Gentile Arena (3,003); Chicago, IL
December 3, 2022; 3:00 p.m., NBCSCHI		DePaul	L 72–78 ^{OT}	3–5	Gentile Arena (4,557); Chicago, IL
December 6, 2022*; 7:00 p.m., NBCSCHI+		Green Bay	W 70–46	4–5	Gentile Arena (2,645); Chicago, IL
December 10, 2022*; 6:30 p.m., ACCN		vs. Clemson; Holiday Hoopsgiving	W 76–58	5–5	State Farm Arena (7,795); Atlanta, GA
December 18, 2022*; 1:00 p.m., NBCSCHI		Albany	W 68–56	6–5	Gentile Arena (3,162); Chicago, IL
December 22, 2022*; 9:00 p.m., P12N		vs. Stanford	L 62–75	6–6	Kaiser Permanente Arena (1,287); Santa Cruz, CA
Atlantic 10 regular season
December 31, 2022; 3:00 p.m., NBCSCHI		George Washington	L 87–97	6–7 (0–1)	Gentile Arena (2,424); Chicago, IL
January 4, 2023; 6:00 p.m., CBSSN		at Davidson	L 57-80	6–8 (0–2)	John M. Belk Arena (2,630); Davidson, NC
January 7, 2023; 1:00 p.m., ESPN+		at George Mason	L 75-86	6–9 (0–3)	EagleBank Arena (3,061); Fairfax, VA
January 10, 2023; 6:00 p.m., CBSSN		VCU	L 64–78	6–10 (0–4)	Gentile Arena (2,249); Chicago, IL
January 14, 2023; 11:30 a.m., USA		at Saint Joseph's	L 55–86	6–11 (0–5)	Hagan Arena (1,442); Philadelphia, PA
January 18, 2023; 6:00 p.m., CBSSN		Saint Louis	L 59–76	6–12 (0–6)	Gentile Arena (4,038); Chicago, IL
January 21, 2023; 3:00 p.m., NBCSCHI		St. Bonaventure	W 67–55	7–12 (1–6)	Gentile Arena (4,114); Chicago, IL
January 25, 2023; 6:00 p.m., ESPN+		at Duquesne	L 58–72	7–13 (1–7)	UPMC Cooper Fieldhouse (1,964); Pittsburgh, PA
January 31, 2023; 8:00 p.m., CBSSN		at Dayton	L 81–85 ^{OT}	7–14 (1–8)	UD Arena (13,407); Dayton, OH
February 4, 2023; 1:30 p.m., USA		George Mason	W 69–61	8–14 (2–8)	Gentile Arena (4,074); Chicago, IL
February 8, 2023; 8:00 p.m., NBCSCHI		Saint Joseph's	L 71–83	8–15 (2–9)	Gentile Arena (2,911); Chicago, IL
February 11, 2023; 3:00 p.m., ESPNU		at Richmond	L 71–74	8–16 (2–10)	Robins Center (7,201); Richmond, VA
February 14, 2023; 6:00 p.m., ESPN+		at UMass	W 64–62	9–16 (3–10)	Mullins Center (2,670); Amherst, MA
February 17, 2023; 6:00 p.m., ESPN2		Dayton	L 49–65	9–17 (3–11)	Gentile Arena (4,557); Chicago, IL
February 22, 2023; 8:00 p.m., NBCSCHI+		Fordham	L 69–71	9–18 (3–12)	Gentile Arena (2,871); Chicago, IL
February 25, 2023; 5:00 p.m., CBSSN		at Saint Louis	L 62–81	9–19 (3–13)	Chaifetz Arena (8,175); St. Louis, MO
March 1, 2023; 8:00 p.m., CBSSN		Rhode Island	L 77–79	9–20 (3–14)	Gentile Arena (3,003); Chicago, IL
March 4, 2023; 1:00 p.m., ESPN+		at La Salle	W 76–73	10–20 (4–14)	Tom Gola Arena (2,176); Philadelphia, PA
A-10 tournament
March 7, 2023; 1:00 p.m., ESPN+	(15)	vs. (10) Saint Joseph's; First round	L 67–72	10–21	Barclays Center; Brooklyn, NY
*Non-conference game. ^{#}Rankings from AP poll. (#) Tournament seedings in parentheses. All times are in Central.
