= Millard, Omaha, Nebraska =

Neighborhood of Omaha, Nebraska

Millard
- Neighborhood
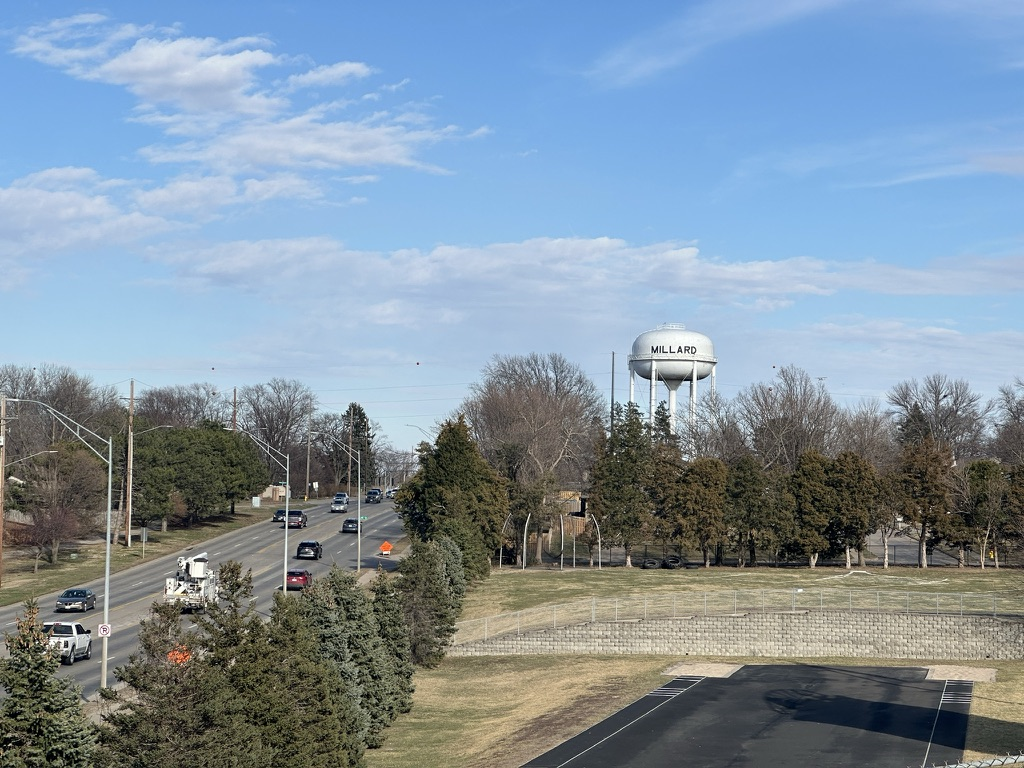
- Water tower in Millard
- Interactive map of Millard
- Coordinates: 41.209493°N 96.1245°W
- Country: United States
- State: Nebraska
- County: Douglas
- City: Omaha
- Founded: 1870
- Incorporated: 1885
- Absorbed: 1971
- Founder: Ezra Millard

Area
  - Total: 32.73 sq mi (84.77 km^{2})

Population (2019)
  - Total: 110,480
  - Density: 3,376/sq mi (1,303/km^{2})
- Time zone: UTC−06:00 (CST)
  - Summer (DST): UTC−05:00 (CDT)
- Zip Codes: 68135, 68137
- Area Codes: 402, 531

Millard is a former town and current neighborhood in southwest Omaha, Nebraska. The original downtown area of Millard (often referred to as 'Old Millard') is near the intersection of Millard Avenue and L Street.

== History ==
Millard was laid out in 1870 by Ezra Millard, and named for him. A post office was established in Millard in 1873, and remained in operation until it was discontinued in 1967. The town was incorporated in 1885. After lengthy legal fights, the town of Millard was annexed by the city of Omaha in 1971. There also were attempts through both the state legislature and the court system to annex Millard’s schools into the Omaha Public Schools, but the Millard Public Schools remained independent. Recently, they have been included under the taxing authority of the Learning Community to extend Omaha's tax base.

== Millard Public Schools ==
The Millard Public Schools system has 25 elementary schools, six middle schools, and four high schools. Similar to schools in Omaha Public Schools, many students that live outside the assigned attendance areas of Millard choose to attend Millard Public Schools. Aldrich Elementary and Black Elk Elementary are IB elementary schools, while North Middle and North High are also IB.

== Demographics ==
As of 2019, the estimated population of Millard was 110,480. There were 39,979 households and 42,305 housing units. The average population density was 3,003.7 per square mile. The racial makeup of the area was 87% White, 2% Black, 1% Native American, 3% from two or more races, 4% Asian, 5% Hispanic, and 0% Other or Pacific Islander.

There were 40,000 households, of which 75% were married couples, 3% were male householders with no female present, 11% were female householder with no male present. 11% of households were made up of individuals. The average household size was 2.7.

The median per capita income was $42,622, versus the median household income of $92,552. 4.1% of the population was under the poverty line, including 4% being children under the age of 18 and 6% being seniors over the age of 65.

== Location ==
Millard is around 144th and L, with a water tower that says Millard on 144th and Q. It extends to around 180th on the west, 108th on the east, Blondo Street on the North, and Harrison Street on the South..

== See also ==
- Millard Public Schools
