= 2022–23 Davidson Wildcats men's basketball team =

American college basketball season

2022–23 Davidson Wildcats men's basketball
- Conference: Atlantic 10 Conference
- Record: 16–16 (8–10 A-10)
- Head coach: Matt McKillop (1st season)
- Assistant coaches: Matt Matheny; Will Reigel; Joshua Heyliger
- Home arena: John M. Belk Arena

2022–23 Atlantic 10 men's basketball standings
	Conf.				Overall
Team	W		L	PCT	W		L	PCT
VCU †	15	–	3	.833	27	–	8	.771
Fordham	12	–	6	.667	25	–	8	.758
Dayton	12	–	6	.667	22	–	12	.647
Saint Louis	12	–	6	.667	21	–	12	.636
George Mason	11	–	7	.611	20	–	13	.606
Duquesne	10	–	8	.556	20	–	13	.606
George Washington	10	–	8	.556	16	–	16	.500
Davidson	8	–	10	.444	16	–	16	.500
Saint Joseph's	8	–	10	.444	16	–	17	.485
St. Bonaventure	8	–	10	.444	14	–	18	.438
Richmond	7	–	11	.389	15	–	18	.455
La Salle	7	–	11	.389	15	–	19	.441
Massachusetts	6	–	12	.333	15	–	16	.484
Rhode Island	5	–	13	.278	9	–	22	.290
Loyola Chicago	4	–	14	.222	10	–	21	.323
† 2023 A10 tournament winner

The 2022–23 Davidson Wildcats men's basketball team represented Davidson College during the 2022–23 NCAA Division I men's basketball season. The Wildcats were led by first-year head coach Matt McKillop and played their home games at the John M. Belk Arena in Davidson, North Carolina as members of the Atlantic 10 Conference (A-10).

== Previous season ==
The Wildcats finished the 2021–22 season 27–7, 15–3 in A-10 play, to win the regular season championship. They defeated Fordham and Saint Louis to advance to the championship game of the A-10 tournament where they lost to Richmond. They received an at-large bid to the NCAA tournament as the No. 10 seed in the West Region, where they lost in the first round to Michigan State.

On June 18, 2022, the school announced that head coach Bob McKillop was retiring after 33 years at the school. His son, Matt McKillop, who had served as an assistant for 14 years, was promoted to head coach.

== Offseason ==
=== Departures ===
Name	Number	Pos.	Height	Weight	Year	Hometown	Reason for departure
Lee Hyun-jung	1	G/F	6'7"	210	Junior	Yongin, South Korea	Declared for 2022 NBA draft
Emory Lanier	2	G	6'3"	180	Sophomore	Atlanta, GA	Transferred to SMU
David Kristensen	12	F	6'10"	210	Junior	Aarhus, Denmark	Signed to play in professional in Spain with BC Navarra
Mike Jones	13	G	6'5"	210	RS Junior	Woodbury, MN	Transferred to Stanford
Drew Dibble	22	G	5'11"	185	RS Senior	Nashville, TN	Walk-on; left the team for personal reasons
Chris Ford	23	F	6'5"	200	Freshman	Huntersville, NC	Transferred to Robert Morris
Nelson Boachie-Yiadom	32	F	6'8"	220	Junior	London, England	Graduate transferred to Hofstra
Luka Brajkovic	35	F	6'10"	250	Senior	Feldkirch, Austria	Graduated; signed to play in professional in Spain with CB Breogán
Ben Craig	40	G	6'1"	190	Senior	Montreat, NC	Walk-on; left the team for personal reasons

=== Incoming transfers ===
Name	Num	Pos.	Height	Weight	Year	Hometown	Previous school
Connor Kochera	23	G	6'5"	200	Junior	Arlington Heights, IL	William & Mary
David Skogman	42	C	6'10"	228	RS Junior	Waukesha, WI	Buffalo

=== Recruiting classes ===
==== 2022 recruiting class ====
College recruiting
Name	Hometown	School	Height	Weight	Commit date
Reed Bailey #32 PF	Wolfeboro, NH	Brewster Academy	6 ft 9 in (2.06 m)	190 lb (86 kg)	Aug 4, 2021
Reed Bailey #32 PF	Recruit ratings: Scout: Rivals: 247Sports: ESPN: (80)				
Sean Logan; SF	Westfield, NJ	Westfield Senior High School	6 ft 10 in (2.08 m)	210 lb (95 kg)	Oct 1, 2021
Sean Logan; SF	Recruit ratings: Scout: Rivals: 247Sports: (0)				
Overall recruit ranking:
Note: In many cases, Scout, Rivals, 247Sports, On3, and ESPN may conflict in their listings of height and weight.; In these cases, the average was taken. ESPN grades are on a 100-point scale.; Sources: "2022 Team Ranking". Rivals.

== Roster ==
2022–23 Davidson Wildcats men's basketball team
Players
Coaches

Pos.	#	Name	Height	Weight	Year	Previous school	Hometown
G	0	Foster Loyer (C)	6 ft 0 in (1.83 m)	175 lb (79 kg)	GS	Clarkston High School; Michigan State	Clarkston, MI
G	1	Reed Bailey	6 ft 11 in (2.11 m)	210 lb (95 kg)	Fr	Brewster Academy	Harvard, MA
F	3	Sam Mennenga	6 ft 9 in (2.06 m)	240 lb (109 kg)	RS Jr	Westlake Boys High School	Auckland, New Zealand
G/F	4	Desmond Watson	6 ft 5 in (1.96 m)	205 lb (93 kg)	So	St. Francis DeSales High School	Columbus, OH
G	5	Grant Huffman	6 ft 3 in (1.91 m)	185 lb (84 kg)	Jr	St. Edward's High School	Aurora, OH
F	15	Sean Logan	6 ft 10 in (2.08 m)	205 lb (93 kg)	Fr	Westfield High School	Westfield, NJ
G	20	Achile Spadone (W)	6 ft 4 in (1.93 m)	185 lb (84 kg)	Fr	Isberne	Geneva, Switzerland
G	22	Riccardo Ghedini	6 ft 7 in (2.01 m)	200 lb (91 kg)	RS Fr	Collegio San Carlo	Milan, Italy
G	23	Connor Kochera	6 ft 5 in (1.96 m)	200 lb (91 kg)	Jr	St. Viator High School; William & Mary	Arlington Heights, IL
G/F	24	Michael Katsock (W)	6 ft 6 in (1.98 m)	205 lb (93 kg)	So	St. Albans School	Washington, D.C.
G/F	34	Styrmir Snær Þrastarson	6 ft 7 in (2.01 m)	210 lb (95 kg)	So	Sunderland College	Reykjavík, Iceland
C	42	David Skogman	6 ft 10 in (2.08 m)	235 lb (107 kg)	RS Jr	Waukesha West High School; Buffalo	Waukesha, WI
F	50	Joe Thomson (W)	6 ft 7 in (2.01 m)	190 lb (86 kg)	Fr	Frontier Regional School	Sunderland, MA
G	51	Brock Matheny (W)	5 ft 10 in (1.78 m)	155 lb (70 kg)	Fr	Burlington Christian Academy	Davidson, NC
G	55	Chris Sosnik (W)	6 ft 2 in (1.88 m)	180 lb (82 kg)	Jr	St. Albans School	Washington, D.C.

Head coach

- Matt McKillop (Davidson)

Assistant coach(es)

- Will Reigel (Davidson)
- Matt Matheny (Davidson)
- Joshua Heyliger (Stonehill)

Legend

- (C) Team captain
- (S) Suspended
- (I) Ineligible
- (W) Walk-on
- Injured
- Current redshirt

Roster
Last update: March 26, 2024

== Schedule and results ==
Date time, TV	Rank^{#}	Opponent^{#}	Result	Record	High points	High rebounds	High assists	Site (attendance) city, state
Non-conference regular season
November 7, 2022*; 7:00 p.m., ESPN+		Guilford	W 87–64	1–0	30 – Loyer	11 – Mennenga	3 – Loyer	John M. Belk Arena (2,608); Davidson, NC
November 9, 2022*; 7:00 p.m., ESPN+		at Wright State	W 102–97 ^{2OT}	2–0	38 – Loyer	11 – Loyer	9 – Loyer	Nutter Center (3,784); Fairborn, OH
November 13, 2022*; 2:00 p.m., ESPN+		VMI	W 75–71	3–0	17 – Loyer	7 – Mennenga	5 – Loyer	John M. Belk Arena (2,991); Davidson, NC
November 17, 2022*; 7:30 p.m., ESPNU		at College of Charleston; Charleston Classic quarterfinals	L 66–89	3–1	19 – Mennenga	8 – Mennenga	4 – Loyer	TD Arena (5,017); Charleston, SC
November 18, 2022*; 7:30 p.m., ESPNews		vs. South Carolina; Charleston Classic consolation 2nd round	W 69–60	4–1	18 – Loyer	6 – tied	4 – tied	TD Arena (3,459); Charleston, SC
November 20, 2022*; 1:00 p.m., ESPNews		vs. Old Dominion; Charleston Classic 5th-place game	W 66–61	5–1	23 – Mennenga	10 – Loyer	3 – tied	TD Arena (1,621); Charleston, SC
November 25, 2022*; 2:00 p.m., ESPN+		San Francisco	W 89–80	6–1	30 – Loyer	5 – Loyer	7 – Loyer	John M. Belk Arena (3,426); Davidson, NC
November 29, 2022*; 7:00 p.m., ESPN+		Charlotte	L 66–68 ^{OT}	6–2	22 – Loyer	7 – tied	8 – Loyer	John M. Belk Arena (3,238); Davidson, NC
December 3, 2022*; 2:00 p.m., FloSports		at Delaware	L 67–69	6–3	20 – Mennenga	9 – Mennenga	7 – Loyer	Bob Carpenter Center (1,859); Newark, DE
December 7, 2022*; 7:00 p.m., ESPN+		Western Carolina	W 72–64	7–3	17 – tied	7 – Mennenga	5 – Loyer	John M. Belk Arena (2,869); Davidson, NC
December 17, 2022*; 6:15 p.m., BTN		vs. No. 1 Purdue; Indy Classic	L 61–69	7–4	14 – Mennenga	5 – tied	10 – Loyer	Gainbridge Fieldhouse (9,242); Indianapolis, IN
December 21, 2022*; 1:00 p.m., ESPN+		Northeastern	L 70–73	7–5	18 – Huffman	10 – Mennenga	5 – Huffman	John M. Belk Arena (3,589); Davidson, NC
Atlantic 10 Regular Season
December 28, 2022; 7:00 p.m., CBSSN		at Fordham	W 57-43	8–5 (1–0)	15 – tied	11 – tied	2 – tied	Rose Hill Gymnasium (1,700); The Bronx, NY
December 31, 2022; 2:00 p.m., ESPN+		Dayton	L 55–69	8–6 (1–1)	13 – Watson	7 – Bailey	2 – tied	John M. Belk Arena (3,953); Davidson, NC
January 4, 2023; 7:00 p.m., CBSSN		Loyola Chicago	W 80–57	9–6 (2–1)	22 – Mennenga	7 – Mennenga	4 – Loyer	John M. Belk Arena (2,630); Davidson, NC
January 7, 2023; 12:00 p.m., USA		at VCU	L 72–89	9–7 (2–2)	20 – Mennenga	9 – Bailey	3 – Loyer	Siegel Center (7,107); Richmond, VA
January 11, 2023; 7:00 p.m., ESPN+		Richmond	L 57–61	9–8 (2–3)	13 – Watson	16 – Mennenga	4 – tied	John M. Belk Arena (3,052); Davidson, NC
January 14, 2023; 12:00 p.m., ESPNU		at George Mason	L 65–67	9–9 (2–4)	16 – tied	7 – Huffman	6 – Huffman	EagleBank Arena (3,212); Fairfax, VA
January 17, 2023; 7:00 p.m., CBSSN		at Dayton	L 61–68	9–10 (2–5)	19 – Watson	13 – Mennenga	4 – Huffman	UD Arena (13,407); Dayton, OH
January 24, 2023; 7:00 p.m., ESPN+		at La Salle	W 64–57	10–10 (3–5)	27 – Mennenga	11 – Mennenga	6 – tied	Tom Gola Arena (1,184); Philadelphia, PA
January 27, 2023; 7:00 p.m., ESPN2		Saint Louis	L 70–74	10–11 (3–6)	16 – Mennenga	10 – Skogman	4 – Loyer	John M. Belk Arena (4,406); Davidson, NC
January 31, 2023; 7:00 p.m., CBSSN		VCU	L 59–61	10–12 (3–7)	12 – Watson	6 – tied	4 – tied	John M. Belk Arena (3,179); Davidson, NC
February 4, 2023; 12:30 p.m., USA		at UMass	W 93–78	11–12 (4–7)	29 – Kochera	7 – Skogman	10 – Huffman	Mullins Center (4,546); Amherst, MA
February 11, 2023; 2:30 p.m., USA		Fordham	L 71–73	11–13 (4–8)	26 – Loyer	9 – Watson	3 – Loyer	John M. Belk Arena (4,091); Davidson, NC
February 15, 2023; 9:00 p.m., CBSSN		at Saint Louis	L 65–78	11–14 (4–9)	17 – Mennenga	9 – Skogman	5 – Loyer	Chaifetz Arena (5,168); St. Louis, MO
February 18, 2023; 12:30 p.m., USA		Saint Joseph's	W 76–75	12–14 (5–9)	17 – tied	7 – Skogman	4 – tied	John M. Belk Arena (3,567); Davidson, NC
February 22, 2023; 7:00 p.m., NBC Digital		St. Bonaventure	W 74–61	13–14 (6–9)	27 – Loyer	8 – Skogman	8 – Huffman	John M. Belk Arena (3,153); Davidson, NC
February 26, 2023; 2:00 p.m., USA		at Duquesne	W 71–67	14–14 (7–9)	16 – Huffman	11 – Mennenga	3 – tied	UPMC Cooper Fieldhouse (3,111); Pittsburgh, PA
March 1, 2023; 7:00 p.m., ESPN+		George Washington	L 70–75	14–15 (7–10)	23 – Mennenga	8 – tied	5 – Huffman	John M. Belk Arena (3,590); Davidson, NC
March 4, 2023; 8:00 p.m., CBSSN		at Rhode Island	W 68–54	15–15 (8–10)	33 – Loyer	9 – Skogman	4 – Huffman	Ryan Center (5,543); Kingston, RI
A-10 tournament
March 8, 2023; 11:30 a.m., USA	(8)	vs. (9) St. Bonaventure; Second round	W 65–54	16–15	17 – Watson	8 – tied	6 – Loyer	Barclays Center; Brooklyn, NY
March 9, 2023; 11:30 a.m., USA	(8)	vs. (1) VCU; Quarterfinals	L 53–71	16–16	10 – tied	8 – Mennenga	5 – Huffman	Barclays Center; Brooklyn, NY
*Non-conference game. ^{#}Rankings from AP poll. (#) Tournament seedings in parentheses. W=West. All times are in Eastern Time.
