= 2022–23 Richmond Spiders men's basketball team =

2022–23 Richmond Spiders men's basketball

2022–23 Richmond Spiders men's basketball
- Conference: Atlantic 10 Conference
- Record: 15–18 (7–11 A-10)
- Head coach: Chris Mooney (18th season; first 27 games); Peter Thomas (interim; final 6 games)
- Assistant coaches: David Boyden; Will Gipe; Peter Thomas
- Home arena: Robins Center

2022–23 Atlantic 10 men's basketball standings
	Conf.				Overall
Team	W		L	PCT	W		L	PCT
VCU †	15	–	3	.833	27	–	8	.771
Fordham	12	–	6	.667	25	–	8	.758
Dayton	12	–	6	.667	22	–	12	.647
Saint Louis	12	–	6	.667	21	–	12	.636
George Mason	11	–	7	.611	20	–	13	.606
Duquesne	10	–	8	.556	20	–	13	.606
George Washington	10	–	8	.556	16	–	16	.500
Davidson	8	–	10	.444	16	–	16	.500
Saint Joseph's	8	–	10	.444	16	–	17	.485
St. Bonaventure	8	–	10	.444	14	–	18	.438
Richmond	7	–	11	.389	15	–	18	.455
La Salle	7	–	11	.389	15	–	19	.441
Massachusetts	6	–	12	.333	15	–	16	.484
Rhode Island	5	–	13	.278	9	–	22	.290
Loyola Chicago	4	–	14	.222	10	–	21	.323
† 2023 A10 tournament winner

The 2022–23 Richmond Spiders men's basketball team represented the University of Richmond during the 2022–23 NCAA Division I men's basketball season. They were led by 18th-year head coach Chris Mooney and played their home games at the Robins Center as members of the Atlantic 10 Conference.

On February 17, 2023, Richmond announced that Mooney would miss the remainder of the 2022–23 season due to heart surgery to address an aneurysm in his ascending aorta. Assistant coach and former Richmond player Peter Thomas served as interim head coach in Mooney's absence, and Mooney returned to his position after the conclusion of the season.

== Previous season ==
The Spiders finished the 2021–22 season 24–13, 10–8 in Atlantic 10 play to finish in sixth place. As the No. 6 seed, they defeated Rhode Island, VCU, Dayton, and Davidson to win the Atlantic 10 tournament. They received the conference's automatic bid to the NCAA tournament as the No. 12 seed in the Midwest Region, where they upset Iowa in the First Round before losing to Providence in the Second Round.

== Offseason ==
=== Departures ===
Name	Number	Pos.	Height	Weight	Year	Hometown	Reason for departure
Jacob Gilyard	0	G	5'9"	160	Graduate Student	Kansas City, MO	Graduated
Souleymane Koureissi	2	F	6'9"	215	Senior	Harlem, NY	Graduated and transferred to Radford
Nathan Cayo	4	F	6'7"	225	Graduate Student	Montreal, Canada	Graduated
Nick Sherod	5	G	6'4"	220	Graduate Student	Richmond, VA	Graduated
Sullivan Kulju	10	F	6'6"	220	Graduate Student	New Berlin, WI	Walk-on; Graduated
Isaiah Wilson	21	G	6'0"	165	Sophomore	Pittsburgh, PA	Transferred to Winthrop
Jordan Gaitley	31	G	6'4"	190	Graduate Student	Haverford, PA	Walk-on; Graduated
Grant Golden	33	F	6'10"	255	Graduate Student	Winchester, VA	Graduated

=== Returning players ===
With the NCAA granting student-athletes an extra year of eligibility due to impacts from the COVID-19 pandemic, two scholarship Spiders who would have otherwise exhausted their eligibility elected to return for the 2021–22 season: Matt Grace and Andre Gustavson.

=== 2022 recruiting class ===
College recruiting information
Name	Hometown	School	Height	Weight	Commit date
Mike Walz; C	Berwyn, PA	Conestoga High School	6 ft 11 in (2.11 m)	250 lb (110 kg)	Jul 25, 2021
Mike Walz; C	Recruit ratings: Rivals: 247Sports: (NR)				
Overall recruit ranking:
Note: In many cases, Scout, Rivals, 247Sports, On3, and ESPN may conflict in their listings of height and weight.; In these cases, the average was taken. ESPN grades are on a 100-point scale.; Sources: "Rivals.com 2022 Richmond Commitments". Rivals.; "ESPN 2022 Richmond Commitments". ESPN.; "2022 Team Ranking". Rivals.

=== Other new players ===
In addition to freshman Walz, Richmond also brought in three new players via transfer: Neal Quinn from Lafayette, Isaiah Bigelow from Wofford, and Jason Roche from The Citadel.

== Roster ==
2022–23 Richmond Spiders men's basketball team
Players
Coaches

Pos.	#	Name	Height	Weight	Year	Previous school	Hometown
G	1	Jason Nelson	5 ft 10 in (1.78 m)	175 lb (79 kg)	RS Fr	John Marshall High School	Richmond, Virginia
G	2	Marcus Randolph	6 ft 5 in (1.96 m)	195 lb (88 kg)	So	Archbishop Wood Catholic High School	Willingboro, New Jersey
F	3	Tyler Burton	6 ft 7 in (2.01 m)	215 lb (98 kg)	Sr	Marianapolis Prep	Uxbridge, Massachusetts
G	4	Dji Bailey	6 ft 5 in (1.96 m)	180 lb (82 kg)	Jr	Greenfield School	Wilson, North Carolina
G	5	Connor Crabtree	6 ft 6 in (1.98 m)	200 lb (91 kg)	GS	Hargrave Military Academy; Tulane	Hillsborough, North Carolina
G	10	Liam Weaver (W)	6 ft 2 in (1.88 m)	190 lb (86 kg)	So	Pembroke Hill School	Kansas City, Missouri
G	11	Jason Roche	6 ft 5 in (1.96 m)	180 lb (82 kg)	So	Saint Mary's College High School	Berkeley, California
G	12	Malcolm Dread	6 ft 4 in (1.93 m)	210 lb (95 kg)	RS Fr	Gonzaga College High School	Detroit, Michigan
F	15	Matt Grace	6 ft 9 in (2.06 m)	230 lb (104 kg)	GS	TRC Academy	Hamilton, Ontario
C	21	Mike Walz	6 ft 11 in (2.11 m)	250 lb (113 kg)	Fr	Conestoga High School	Berwyn, Pennsylvania
G	22	Andre Gustavson	6 ft 5 in (1.96 m)	205 lb (93 kg)	GS	Helsinki Basketball Academy	Helsinki, Finland
F	24	Isaiah Bigelow	6 ft 7 in (2.01 m)	200 lb (91 kg)	GS	Ben L. Smith High School	Greensboro, North Carolina
G	25	Quentin Southall (W)	6 ft 3 in (1.91 m)	180 lb (82 kg)	Jr	Georgetown Prep	Alexandria, Virginia
C	32	Neal Quinn	7 ft 0 in (2.13 m)	250 lb (113 kg)	Sr	Ramapo High School	Allendale, New Jersey
G	34	Gabe Arizin (W)	6 ft 4 in (1.93 m)	190 lb (86 kg)	Sr	St. Joseph's Prep	West Chester, Pennsylvania
F	35	Aidan Noyes	6 ft 7 in (2.01 m)	190 lb (86 kg)	RS Fr	Moeller High School	Cincinnati, Ohio

Head coach

- Chris Mooney (Princeton)

Assistant coach(es)

- David Boyden (Western Kentucky)
- Will Gipe (Virginia Tech)
- Peter Thomas (Richmond)

Legend

- (C) Team captain
- (S) Suspended
- (I) Ineligible
- (W) Walk-on
- Injured
- Current redshirt

Roster
Last update: October 11, 2022

== Schedule and results ==
Richmond announced a 30-game schedule on September 7, 2022, with a final game against Wichita State announced on September 15. The non-conference schedule began on November 7 with a home game against VMI and concluded with a December 28 home game against Coppin State. Richmond's 18-game Atlantic 10 schedule will see the Spiders facing VCU, George Mason, George Washington, and St. Bonaventure twice each and all other conference teams once each.

Date time, TV	Rank^{#}	Opponent^{#}	Result	Record	High points	High rebounds	High assists	Site (attendance) city, state
Non-conference regular season
November 7, 2022*; 7:00 p.m., MASN2/ESPN+		VMI	W 69–48	1–0	13 – Nelson	11 – Burton	3 – Tied	Robins Center (6,049); Richmond, VA
November 11, 2022*; 7:00 p.m., MASN2/ESPN+		Northern Iowa	W 68–55	2–0	21 – Nelson	9 – Burton	5 – Grace	Robins Center (6,814); Richmond, VA
November 14, 2022*; 7:00 p.m., FloHoops		at Charleston	L 90–92 ^{OT}	2–1	38 – Burton	8 – Bigelow	4 – Tied	TD Arena (4,515); Charleston, SC
November 17, 2022*; 7:00 p.m., MASN/ESPN+		Wichita State	L 53–56	2–2	16 – Bigelow	11 – Bigelow	7 – Nelson	Robins Center (5,896); Richmond, VA
November 21, 2022*; 7:00 p.m., ESPN2		vs. Syracuse; Empire Classic semifinals	L 71–74 ^{OT}	2–3	17 – Bigelow	15 – Burton	6 – Nelson	Barclays Center; Brooklyn, NY
November 22, 2022*; 7:00 p.m., ESPN2		vs. Temple; Empire Classic consolation	W 61–49	3–3	18 – Burton	8 – Quinn	3 – Tied	Barclays Center; Brooklyn, NY
November 30, 2022*; 7:00 p.m., ESPN+		at Toledo	L 67–90	3–4	15 – Burton	9 – Burton	4 – Quinn	Savage Arena (4,166); Toledo, OH
December 3, 2022*; 7:00 p.m., FloHoops		at William & Mary	L 57–58	3–5	26 – Burton	6 – Bigelow	5 – Grace	Kaplan Arena (3,179); Williamsburg, VA
December 10, 2022*; 2:00 p.m., NBCSWA/ESPN+		Drake	W 82–52	4–5	19 – Nelson	7 – Burton	3 – Quinn	Robins Center (6,447); Richmond, VA
December 13, 2022*; 7:00 p.m., MASN/ESPN+		Fairleigh Dickinson	W 77–48	5–5	17 – Bigelow	9 – Burton	5 – Nelson	Robins Center (5,004); Richmond, VA
December 17, 2022*; 7:00 p.m., ACCNX		vs. Clemson; Greenville Winter Invitational	L 57–85	5–6	21 – Burton	7 – Burton	3 – Quinn	Bon Secours Wellness Arena (4,117); Greenville, SC
December 21, 2022*; 7:00 p.m., NBCSWA/ESPN+		Bucknell	W 81–71	6–6	29 – Burton	5 – Burton	4 – Gustavson	Robins Center (5,803); Richmond, VA
December 28, 2022*; 7:00 p.m., WTVR-TV/ESPN+		Coppin State	W 83–65	7–6	20 – Burton	8 – Tied	7 – Quinn	Robins Center (6,007); Richmond, VA
A-10 regular season
December 31, 2022; 2:00 p.m., ESPN+		at George Mason	L 58–62	7–7 (0–1)	21 – Burton	12 – Bigelow	2 – Tied	EagleBank Arena (4,014); Fairfax, VA
January 4, 2023; 7:00 p.m., ESPN+		George Washington	W 73–63	8–7 (1–1)	26 – Burton	8 – Bigelow	3 – Tied	Robins Center (5,394); Richmond, VA
January 7, 2023; 6:00 p.m., NBCS WA/ESPN+		Duquesne	W 75–73	9–7 (2–1)	23 – Burton	9 – Quinn	4 – Tied	Robins Center (7,201); Richmond, VA
January 11, 2023; 7:00 p.m., ESPN+		at Davidson	W 61–57	10–7 (3–1)	17 – Burton	12 – Burton	4 – Bigelow	John M. Belk Arena (3,052); Davidson, NC
January 14, 2023; 2:30 p.m., USA		at St. Bonaventure	L 63–71	10–8 (3–2)	16 – Grace	6 – Bigelow	3 – Randolph	Reilly Center (4,351); St. Bonaventure, NY
January 17, 2023; 7:00 p.m., MASN2/ESPN+		Rhode Island	W 64–57	11–8 (4–2)	23 – Burton	7 – Tied	3 – Grace	Robins Center (5,892); Richmond, VA
January 20, 2023; 7:00 p.m., ESPN2		VCU; Capital City Classic	L 62–74	11–9 (4–3)	14 – Burton	5 – Tied	3 – Gustavson	Robins Center (7,201); Richmond, VA
January 25, 2023; 7:00 p.m., ESPN+		at UMass	L 76–85	11–10 (4–4)	20 – Burton	10 – Burton	6 – Quinn	Mullins Center (2,143); Amherst, MA
January 28, 2023; 4:00 p.m., CBSSN		at Dayton	L 60–86	11–11 (4–5)	19 – Bigelow	5 – Burton	3 – Grace	UD Arena (13,407); Dayton, OH
February 1, 2023; 7:00 p.m., MASN2/ESPN+		St. Bonaventure	L 62–66	11–12 (4–6)	22 – Burton	9 – Burton	3 – Bailey	Robins Center (5,235); Richmond, VA
February 5, 2023 noon, USA		Fordham	W 68–58	12–12 (5–6)	21 – Grace	8 – Burton	2 – Tied	Robins Center (7,201); Richmond, VA
February 8, 2023; 7:00 p.m., ESPN+		at George Washington	L 105–107 ^{2OT}	12–13 (5–7)	28 – Grace	9 – Bigelow	4 – Quinn	Charles E. Smith Center (1,067); Washington, D.C.
February 11, 2023; 4:00 p.m., ESPNU		Loyola Chicago	W 74–71	13–13 (6–7)	23 – Burton	5 – Tied	3 – Tied	Robins Center (7,201); Richmond, VA
February 15, 2023; 7:00 p.m., ESPN+		at La Salle	L 62–68	13–14 (6–8)	16 – Tied	10 – Burton	8 – Quinn	Tom Gola Arena (1,352); Philadelphia, PA
February 21, 2023; 7:00 p.m., MASN/ESPN+		Saint Louis	W 81–78	14–14 (7–8)	20 – Burton	9 – Burton	5 – Grace	Robins Center (6,022); Richmond, VA
February 24, 2023; 7:00 p.m., ESPN2		at VCU; Capital City Classic	L 58–73	14–15 (7–9)	21 – Quinn	7 – Burton	3 – Nelson	Siegel Center (7,637); Richmond, VA
March 1, 2023; 7:00 p.m., ESPN+		at Saint Joseph's	L 67–83	14–16 (7–10)	15 – Tied	8 – Grace	6 – Randolph	Hagan Arena (1,594); Philadelphia, PA
March 4, 2023; 12:30 p.m., USA		George Mason	L 60–62	14–17 (7–11)	17 – Burton	6 – Grace	3 – Tied	Robins Center (7,201); Richmond, VA
A-10 tournament
March 7, 2023; 11:30 a.m., ESPN+	(12)	vs. (13) UMass; First Round	W 71–38	15–17	28 – Burton	10 – Quinn	6 – Quinn	Barclays Center (5,119); Brooklyn, NY
March 8, 2023; 2:00 p.m., USA	(12)	vs. (5) George Mason; Second Round	L 57–62	15–18	23 – Burton	6 – Tied	2 – Quinn	Barclays Center (5,011); Brooklyn, NY
*Non-conference game. ^{#}Rankings from AP Poll. (#) Tournament seedings in parentheses. All times are in Eastern Time.
