= 2022–23 St. Bonaventure Bonnies men's basketball team =

American college basketball season

2022–23 St. Bonaventure Bonnies men's basketball
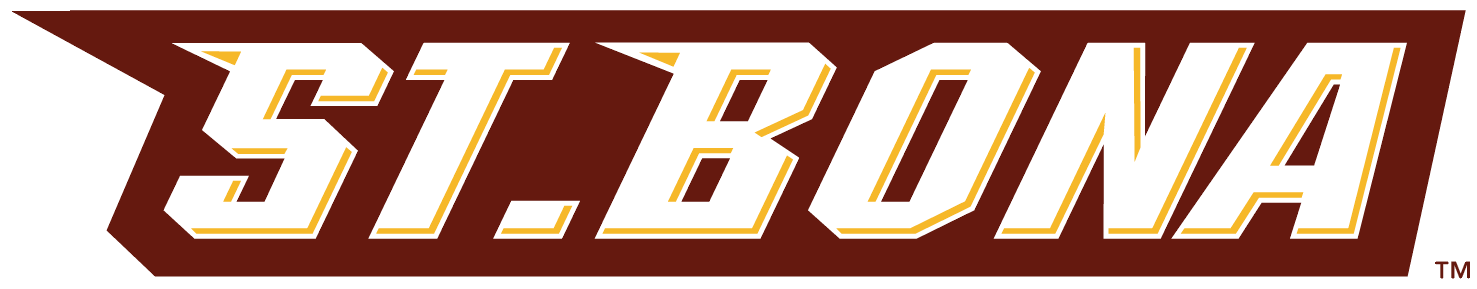
- Conference: Atlantic 10 Conference
- Record: 14–18 (8–10 A–10)
- Head coach: Mark Schmidt (16th season)
- Assistant coaches: Steve Curran; Sean Neal; Chris Lowe
- Home arena: Reilly Center

2022–23 Atlantic 10 men's basketball standings
	Conf.				Overall
Team	W		L	PCT	W		L	PCT
VCU †	15	–	3	.833	27	–	8	.771
Fordham	12	–	6	.667	25	–	8	.758
Dayton	12	–	6	.667	22	–	12	.647
Saint Louis	12	–	6	.667	21	–	12	.636
George Mason	11	–	7	.611	20	–	13	.606
Duquesne	10	–	8	.556	20	–	13	.606
George Washington	10	–	8	.556	16	–	16	.500
Davidson	8	–	10	.444	16	–	16	.500
Saint Joseph's	8	–	10	.444	16	–	17	.485
St. Bonaventure	8	–	10	.444	14	–	18	.438
Richmond	7	–	11	.389	15	–	18	.455
La Salle	7	–	11	.389	15	–	19	.441
Massachusetts	6	–	12	.333	15	–	16	.484
Rhode Island	5	–	13	.278	9	–	22	.290
Loyola Chicago	4	–	14	.222	10	–	21	.323
† 2023 A10 tournament winner

The 2022–23 St. Bonaventure Bonnies men's basketball team represented St. Bonaventure University during the 2022–23 NCAA Division I men's basketball season. The Bonnies, led by 16th-year head coach Mark Schmidt, played their home games at the Reilly Center in Olean, New York as members of the Atlantic 10 Conference (A-10).

The Bonnies finished the season 14–18, 8–10 in A-10 play, to finish in a three-way tie for eighth place. As a ninth seed, they lost in the second round to Davidson of the A-10 tournament.

== Previous season ==
The Bonnies finished the 2021–22 season 23–10, 12–5 in A-10 play, to finish in fourth place. They lost in the quarterfinals of the A-10 tournament to Saint Louis. They received an at-large bid to the National Invitation Tournament where they defeated Colorado, Oklahoma and Virginia to advance to the semifinals. There they lost to Xavier.

The Bonnies were ranked No. 24 in the preseason AP poll, the first time they had ever been ranked in the preseason AP poll.

== Offseason ==
=== Departures ===
Name	Number	Pos.	Height	Weight	Year	Hometown	Reason for departure
Kyle Lofton	0	G	6' 3"	185	Senior	Hillside, NJ	Graduate transferred to Florida
Dominick Welch	1	G	6' 5"	205	Senior	Buffalo, NY	Graduate transferred to Alabama
Quadry Adams	2	G	6' 3"	190	Sophomore	Piscataway, NJ	Transferred to Sacramento State
Joryam Saizonou	3	G	6' 3"	182	Freshman	Almere, Netherlands	Transferred to UNC Greensboro
Linton Brown	4	G	6' 5"	210	Junior	Delray Beach, FL	Transferred to Coastal Carolina
Jaren Holmes	5	G	6' 4"	210	Senior	Romulus, MI	Graduate transferred to Iowa State
Oluwasegun Durosinmi	10	F/C	6' 9"	235	Sophomore	Lagos, Nigeria	Transferred to Northern Illinois
Justin Ndjock-Tadjore	11	G	6' 7"	190	Freshman	Gatineau, QC	Transferred
Abdoul Karim Coulibaly	12	F	6' 9"	235	Junior	Bamako, Mali	Transferred to UMass Lowell
Pedro Rossi	20	F	6' 8"	215	Freshman	Bahía Blanca, Argentina	Walk-on; transferred to Minnesota Crookston
Osun Osunniyi	21	F/C	6' 10"	220	Senior	Pleasantville, NJ	Graduate transferred to Iowa State
Jalen Adaway	33	G	6' 5"	215	RS Senior	Logansport, IN	Graduated/went undrafted in 2022 NBA draft

=== Incoming transfers ===
Name	Number	Pos.	Height	Weight	Year	Hometown	Previous school
Kyrell Luc	1	G	5' 11"	165	Sophomore	Dorchester, MA	Holy Cross
Moses Flowers	4	G	6' 3"	180	RS Junior	Dorchester, MA	Hartford
Daryl Banks III	5	G	6' 3"	165	RS Junior	Los Angeles, CA	Saint Peter's
Max Amadasun	10	C	6' 9"	230	RS Sophomore	Dublin, Ireland	Pittsburgh
Chad Venning	32	F	6' 10"	280	RS Sophomore	Brooklyn, NY	Morgan State
Anquan Hill	35	F	6' 9"	195	Sophomore	Philadelphia, PA	Fairleigh Dickinson

=== Recruiting classes ===
==== 2022 recruiting class ====
College recruiting information
Name	Hometown	School	Height	Weight	Commit date
Yann Farell; SF	Colora, MD	Brewster Academy	6 ft 7 in (2.01 m)	180 lb (82 kg)	Apr 24, 2022
Yann Farell; SF	Recruit ratings: Rivals: 247Sports:				
Melian Martinez; C	Cerritos, CA	Valley Christian High School	6 ft 9 in (2.06 m)	180 lb (82 kg)	Jun 10, 2022
Melian Martinez; C	Recruit ratings: 247Sports:				
Barry Evans; SF	Baltimore, MD	Putnam Science Academy	6 ft 7 in (2.01 m)	198 lb (90 kg)	Sep 6, 2021
Barry Evans; SF	Recruit ratings: No ratings found				
Overall recruit ranking:
Note: In many cases, Scout, Rivals, 247Sports, On3, and ESPN may conflict in their listings of height and weight.; In these cases, the average was taken. ESPN grades are on a 100-point scale.; Sources: "2022 Team Ranking". Rivals.

==== 2023 recruiting class ====
College recruiting information (2023)
Name	Hometown	School	Height	Weight	Commit date
Miles Rose; SG	Rochester, NY	Putnam Science Academy	6 ft 4 in (1.93 m)	185 lb (84 kg)	Sep 16, 2022
Miles Rose; SG	Recruit ratings: No ratings found				
Overall recruit ranking:
Note: In many cases, Scout, Rivals, 247Sports, On3, and ESPN may conflict in their listings of height and weight.; In these cases, the average was taken. ESPN grades are on a 100-point scale.; Sources: "2023 Team Ranking". Rivals.

== Roster ==
2022–23 St. Bonaventure Bonnies men's basketball team
Players
Coaches

Pos.	#	Name	Height	Weight	Year	Previous school	Hometown
F	0	Barry Evans	6 ft 8 in (2.03 m)	205 lb (93 kg)	Fr	Putnam Science Academy	Baltimore, MD
G	1	Kyrell Luc	5 ft 11 in (1.8 m)	165 lb (75 kg)	So	Holy Cross	Dorchester, MA
F	2	Yann Farell	6 ft 6 in (1.98 m)	200 lb (91 kg)	Fr	Keystone Academy (PA)	Libreville, Gabon
G	4	Moses Flowers	6 ft 3 in (1.91 m)	180 lb (82 kg)	RS Jr	Hartford	Dorchester, MA
G	5	Daryl III Banks	6 ft 3 in (1.91 m)	170 lb (77 kg)	RS Jr	Saint Peter's	Los Angeles, CA
C	10	Max Amadasun	6 ft 9 in (2.06 m)	250 lb (113 kg)	RS So	Pittsburgh	Dublin, Ireland
F	11	Anouar Mellouk	6 ft 8 in (2.03 m)	205 lb (93 kg)	RS Fr	Fork Union Military Academy	Almere, Netherlands
F/C	21	Melian Martinez	6 ft 10 in (2.08 m)	200 lb (91 kg)	Fr	North Florida Educational Institute	Santo Domingo, Dominican Republic
G	23	Anthony Belardinelli (W)	6 ft 3 in (1.91 m)	—	Jr	Northern Highlands High School	Upper Saddle River, NJ
G	24	Brett Rumpel	6 ft 4 in (1.93 m)	190 lb (86 kg)	Fr	Seton Catholic Central	Binghamton, NY
G	30	Broek Ostrom (W)	6 ft 2 in (1.88 m)	—	Fr	Holley Jr. Sr. High School	Holley, NY
F	32	Chad Venning	6 ft 10 in (2.08 m)	270 lb (122 kg)	RS So	Morgan State	Brooklyn, NY
F	35	Anquan Hill	6 ft 9 in (2.06 m)	200 lb (91 kg)	So	Fairleigh Dickinson	Philadelphia, PA

Head coach

- Mark Schmidt (Boston College)

Assistant coach(es)

- Steve Curran (Merrimack)
- Sean Neal (La Salle)
- Chris Lowe (UMass)

Legend

- (C) Team captain
- (S) Suspended
- (I) Ineligible
- (W) Walk-on
- Injured
- Current redshirt

Roster

== Schedule and results ==
Date time, TV	Rank^{#}	Opponent^{#}	Result	Record	High points	High rebounds	High assists	Site (attendance) city, state
Exhibition
November 2, 2022*; 7:00 p.m., ESPN+		Alfred	W 76–48		18 – Banks III	11 – Farell	7 – Banks III	Reilly Center (2,342); Olean, NY
Non-conference regular season
November 7, 2022*; 7:00 p.m., ESPN+		Saint Francis (PA)	W 71–58	1–0	23 – Luc	8 – Evans	5 – Luc	Reilly Center (3,436); Olean, NY
November 12, 2022*; 7:00 p.m., ESPN+		at Canisius	L 80–84 ^{OT}	1–1	22 – Banks III	6 – Luc	9 – Luc	Koessler Athletic Center (1,903); Buffalo, NY
November 15, 2022*; 7:00 p.m., ESPN+		vs. South Dakota State	L 62–66	1–2	17 – Luc	11 – Farell	5 – Luc	Sanford Pentagon (3,093); Sioux Falls, SD
November 19, 2022*; 2:00 p.m., ESPN+		Bowling Green; Gotham Classic	W 81–68	2–2	34 – Banks III	8 – Evans	6 – Luc	Reilly Center (3,189); Olean, NY
November 22, 2022*; 7:00 p.m., ESPN+		Southern Indiana; Gotham Classic	W 80–66	3–2	21 – Venning	7 – 2 tied	6 – Luc	Reilly Center (3,102); Olean, NY
November 25, 2022*; 4:00 p.m., ESPN+		vs. Notre Dame; Gotham Classic	W 63–51	4–2	16 – Luc	14 – Farell	6 – Luc	UBS Arena (5,178); Elmont, NY
Novcember 30, 2022*; 7:00 p.m., ESPN+		Middle Tennessee	W 71–64	5–2	22 – Luc	8 – Farell	3 – Luc	Reilly Center (3,089); Olean, NY
December 3, 2022*; 2:30 p.m., ESPN+		at Buffalo	L 66–83	5–3	18 – Farell	9 – Farell	4 – Banks III	Alumni Arena (4,633); Buffalo, NY
December 7, 2022*; 7:00 p.m., ESPN+		Cleveland State	W 61–42	6–3	15 – Banks III	9 – Evans	4 – Luc	Reilly Center (3,158); Olean, NY
December 11, 2022*; 11:30 a.m., YES		vs. Iona; Basketball Hall of Fame Invitational	L 57–72	6–4	14 – 2 tied	10 – Venning	4 – Banks III	Barclays Center; Brooklyn, NY
December 16, 2022*; 7:00 p.m., ESPN+		Florida Gulf Coast	L 58–71	6–5	18 – Banks III	10 – Farell	2 – 5 tied	Reilly Center (3,005); Olean, NY
December 19, 2022*; 7:00 p.m., ESPN+		at Siena; Franciscan Cup	L 70–76	6–6	14 – Flowers	4 – Hill	3 – Flowers	MVP Arena (5,616); Albany, NY
December 21, 2022*; 7:00 p.m., ESPN+		at Northern Iowa	L 52–62	6–7	12 – 2 tied	8 – Farell	3 – Luc	McLeod Center (1,876); Cedar Falls, IA
A-10 regular season
December 31, 2022; 2:00 p.m., ESPN+		UMass	W 83–64	7–7 (1–0)	31 – Banks III	10 – Farell	7 – Flowers	Reilly Center (3,978); Olean, NY
January 4, 2023; 7:00 p.m., ESPN+		George Mason	W 73–69	8–7 (2–0)	27 – Banks III	9 – Venning	10 – Luc	Reilly Center (3,382); Olean, NY
January 7, 2023; 4:00 p.m., ESPN+		at Saint Louis	L 55–78	8–8 (2–1)	23 – Venning	6 – tied	2 – tied	Chaifetz Arena (8,219); St. Louis, MO
January 11, 2023; 7:00 p.m., ESPN+		at Rhode Island	L 67–68	8–9 (2–2)	20 – Luc	7 – tied	9 – Luc	Ryan Center (4,722); Kingston, RI
January 14, 2023; 2:30 p.m., USA		Richmond	W 71–63	9–9 (3–2)	20 – tied	10 – Hill	3 – Banks III	Reilly Center (4,351); Olean, NY
January 18, 2023; 7:00 p.m., ESPN+		Duquesne	W 65–56	10–9 (4–2)	15 – Banks	8 – Luc	4 – tied	Reilly Center (4,107); Olean, NY
January 21, 2023; 4:00 p.m., ESPN+		at Loyola Chicago	L 55–67	10–10 (4–3)	16 – Venning	9 – Evans	3 – Evans	Joseph J. Gentile Arena (4,114); Chicago, IL
January 25, 2023; 7:00 p.m., ESPN+		Fordham	L 68–79	10–11 (4–4)	29 – Banks III	6 – tied	6 – Luc	Reilly Center (3,854); Olean, NY
January 28, 2023; 6:00 p.m., CBSSN		at VCU	W 61–58	11–11 (5–4)	15 – 2 tied	7 – Farell	4 – Luc	Siegel Center (7,637); Richmond, VA
February 1, 2023; 7:00 p.m., ESPN+		at Richmond	W 66–62	12–11 (6–4)	18 – Farell	9 – Banks III	4 – Banks III	Robins Center (5,235); Richmond, VA
February 4, 2023; 8:00 p.m., ESPNU		Dayton	W 68–59	13–11 (7–4)	17 – Venning	8 – Venning	5 – Banks III	Reilly Center (4,850); Olean, NY
February 8, 2023; 7:00 p.m., ESPN+		La Salle	L 70–76	13–12 (7–5)	16 – 2 tied	6 – Banks III	6 – Luc	Reilly Center (3,798); Olean, NY
February 11, 2023; 2:30 p.m., USA		at Duquesne	L 54–56	13–13 (7–6)	15 – Banks III	8 – Venning	3 – Farell	UPMC Cooper Fieldhouse (3,333); Pittsburgh, PA
February 15, 2023; 7:00 p.m., ESPN+		at Fordham	L 63–78	13–14 (7–7)	15 – Venning	5 – Flowers	8 – Luc	Rose Hill Gymnasium (1,808); The Bronx, NY
February 19, 2023; 2:00 p.m., USA		George Washington	L 81–83 ^{OT}	13–15 (7–8)	22 – Venning	8 – Venning	4 – Rumpel	Reilly Center (4,760); Olean, NY
February 22, 2023; 7:00 p.m., NBC Digital		at Davidson	L 61–74	13–16 (7–9)	16 – Flowers	5 – 2 tied	3 – 2 tied	John M. Belk Arena (3,153); Davidson, NC
February 26, 2023; 12:00 p.m., USA		Saint Joseph's	W 89–76	14–16 (8–9)	36 – Banks III	6 – Venning	3 – 2 tied	Reilly Center (4,394); Olean, NY
March 4, 2023; 2:30 p.m., USA		at UMass	L 60–71	14–17 (8–10)	18 – Venning	8 – Venning	6 – Luc	Mullins Center (3,474); Amherst, MA
A-10 tournament
March 8, 2023; 11:30 a.m., USA	(9)	vs. (8) Davidson; Second round	L 54–65	14–18	16 – Venning	7 – Farrell	5 – tied	Barclays Center; Brooklyn, NY
*Non-conference game. ^{#}Rankings from AP poll. (#) Tournament seedings in parentheses. All times are in Eastern.
