= Saint Thomas (basketball) =

American basketball player (born 2003)

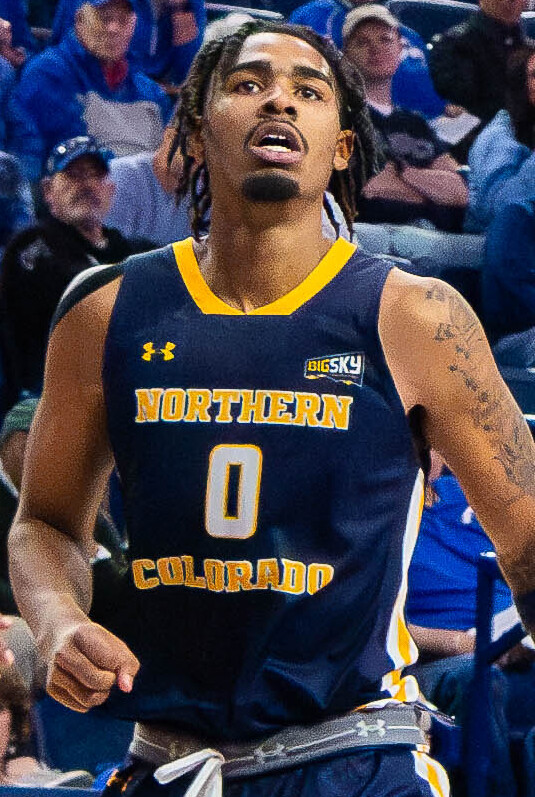
- Thomas in 2023

No. 1 – Delaware Blue Coats
- Position: Small forward
- League: NBA G League

Personal information
- Born: May 1, 2003 (age 23) Omaha, Nebraska, U.S.
- Listed height: 6 ft 7 in (2.01 m)
- Listed weight: 235 lb (107 kg)

Career information
- High school: Millard North (Omaha, Nebraska)
- College: Loyola Chicago (2021–2023); Northern Colorado (2023–2024); USC (2024–2025)
- NBA draft: 2025: undrafted
- Playing career: 2025–present

Career history
- 2025–present: Delaware Blue Coats

Career highlights
- First-team All-Big Sky (2024); Big Sky Newcomer of the Year (2024)
- Stats at NBA.com
- Stats at Basketball Reference

Saint Thomas (May 1, 2003) is an American professional basketball player for the Delaware Blue Coats of the NBA G League. He played college basketball for the USC Trojans, Northern Colorado Bears, and Loyola Chicago Ramblers.

== Early life and high school ==
Thomas grew up in Omaha, Nebraska and attended Millard North High School. He averaged 21.2 points, 7.9 rebounds, and 5.2 assists per game as a senior. Thomas committed to play college basketball at Loyola Chicago.

== College career ==
Thomas began his college career at Loyola Chicago. He left the team midway through his sophomore season in order to focus on his mental health. Thomas later entered the NCAA transfer portal.

Thomas transferred to Northern Colorado. In his lone season with the Bears, he was named the Big Sky Conference Newcomer of the Year and first team all-conference after averaging 19.7 points, 9.8 rebounds, and 4.2 assists per game. Thomas entered the transfer portal a second time after the season.

Thomas transferred to USC as a graduate transfer.

== Professional career ==
=== Delaware Blue Coats (2025–2026) ===
Thomas went undrafted in the 2025 NBA Draft. He then signed with the 76ers.

=== Philadelphia 76ers (2026) ===
On September 1, 2026, Thomas signed an Exhibit 10 contract with the Philadelphia 76ers.

== Career statistics ==
Legend
GP	Games played	GS	Games started	MPG	Minutes per game
FG%	Field goal percentage	3P%	3-point field goal percentage	FT%	Free throw percentage
RPG	Rebounds per game	APG	Assists per game	SPG	Steals per game
BPG	Blocks per game	PPG	Points per game	**Bold**	Career high

=== College ===
Year	Team	GP	GS	MPG	FG%	3P%	FT%	RPG	APG	SPG	BPG	PPG
2021–22	Loyola	27	0	6.3	.400	.310	**.875**	1.0	.4	.3	.1	1.8
2022–23	Loyola	14	5	18.3	.271	.200	.813	3.1	1.6	.6	.1	3.2
2023–24	Northern Colorado	32	32	**34.8**	**.472**	**.330**	.868	**9.8**	**4.2**	**1.7**	**.9**	**19.7**
2024–25	USC	**35**	**35**	33.9	.465	.303	.633	5.9	**4.2**	1.3	.5	9.5
Career		108	72	25.2	.455	.310	.800	5.5	2.9	1.1	.4	9.8
