= Caden VerMaas =

American football player (born 2006)

No. 25 – Rice Owls
- Position: Safety
- Class: Redshirt Freshman

Personal information
- Born: July 31, 2006 (age 20)
- Listed height: 6 ft 0 in (1.83 m)
- Listed weight: 190 lb (86 kg)

Career information
- High school: Millard North (Omaha, Nebraska)
- College: Nebraska (2025); Rice (2026–present)
- Stats at ESPN

Caden VerMaas (born July 31, 2006) is an American football safety for the Rice Owls. He previously played for the Nebraska Cornhuskers.

== Early life ==
VerMaas played for Millard North High School. He took extra classes in order to graduate early. In his three-year varsity career, he totaled 93 tackles, five interceptions, and four forced fumbles.

== College career ==
=== Nebraska ===
VerMaas committed to Nebraska in April 2023, becoming the team's first class of 2025 commit. He officially signed with the team in December 2024. In the 2025 season, he was placed on a redshirt, to preserve his eligibility. He called the elevation of John Butler to be the defensive coordinator of the team a "great hire," and played two games during the season. VerMaas entered the transfer portal in January 2026, though his entry was first reported in December.

=== Rice ===
Vermaas committed to Rice on January 9, 2026.
