= Millard Public Schools =

School district in Nebraska, United States

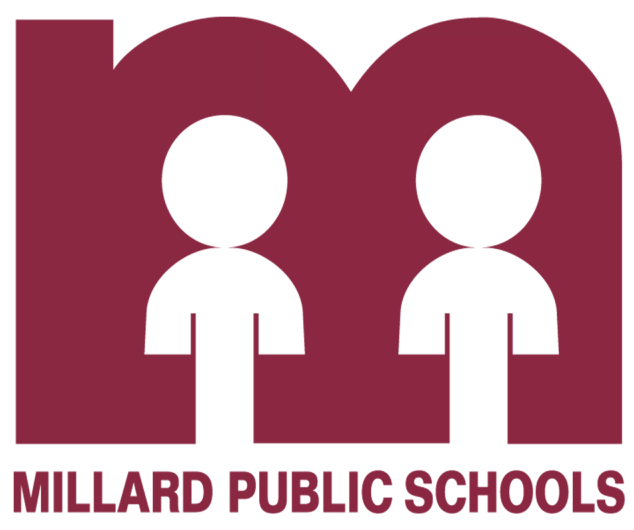

Location
- Millard, Omaha, Nebraska

District information
- Type: Public school district
- Grades: K–12
- Established: 1942; 83 years ago
- Superintendent: Dr. John Schwartz, Ed.D.
- Chair of the board: Amanda McGill Johnson
- Schools: 36
- NCES District ID: 3173740
- Affiliation: Learning Community of Douglas and Sarpy Counties

Students and staff
- Students: 23,762
- Teachers: 1,504
- Staff: 1,093
- Athletic conference: NSAA

Other information
- Website: Official website

The Millard Public Schools is a school district in the southwest part of Omaha, Nebraska, United States. The first school in Millard was established in the fall of 1870. The school district is named for Ezra Millard (1833-1886), who platted Millard, a mostly uninhabited prairie 12 miles southwest of the city. In the late 1950s, seven nearby rural school districts were merged into the Millard district, setting it up for growth as Interstate 80 reached Millard, giving the area easier access to Omaha, and a large Western Electric manufacturing plant opened just north of town.

The former city of Millard was annexed by the City of Omaha in 1971 after a lengthy legal battle, but the Millard school district remained independent of Omaha. Today the Millard School District has diverse programs such as Nebraska's only K-12 International Baccalaureate program, offered at Millard North High school, Millard North Middle School, Aldrich Elementary, and Black Elk Elementary. The district also offers the Core Academy and Montessori, as well as many other programs.

Thirteen Millard schools have earned the Blue Ribbon Award from the U.S. Department of Education. Kiplinger's Magazine cited the "top-rated, nationally recognized" Millard School District as one of the reasons Omaha rated No. 3 in the list of the Top 10 Best Cities for 2008.

Millard is the third largest district in Nebraska. The district currently has four high schools: Millard North High School, Millard West High School, Millard South High School, and Keith Lutz Horizon High School.

== Attendance area ==
Within Douglas County, the district includes portions of Omaha and Boys Town.

The district extends into Sarpy County, where the district includes sections of Chalco and La Vista.

== Middle schools (grades 6-8) ==
- Andersen Middle School
- Beadle Middle School
- Central Middle School
- Peter Kiewit Middle School
- Millard North Middle School
- Russell Middle School

== High schools (grades 9-12) ==
- Millard North High School
- Millard South High School
- Millard West High School
- Keith Lutz Horizon High School

== Elementary schools (K-grade 5) ==
- Ackerman
- Bess Streeter Aldrich
- Black Elk
- Bryan
- Cather
- Cody
- Cottonwood
- Disney
- Ezra Millard
- Grace Abbott
- Harvey Oaks
- Hitchcock
- Holling Heights
- Montclair
- Morton
- Neihardt
- Norris
- Reagan
- Reeder
- Rockwell
- Rohwer
- Sandoz
- Upchurch
- Wheeler
- Willowdale

=== Willowdale ===
Willowdale enrolls about 405 students and is notable for its website, WillowWeb, which features blogs, photos, and announcements. Radio WillowWeb is a podcast produced by Willowdale students and teachers. It was the first podcast by an elementary school in the United States and covers a range of educational topics.

== See also ==
- List of public schools in Omaha, Nebraska
