= Millard West High School =

Location
- 5710 S 176 Avenue; Omaha, Nebraska 68135; United States

Information
- Type: Public high school
- Established: August 17, 1995
- Principal: Greg Tiemann
- Teaching staff: 131.99 (FTE)
- Grades: 9–12
- Enrollment: 2,304 (2023–2024)
- Student to teacher ratio: 17.46
- Colors: Black and green
- Mascot: Wildcats
- Newspaper: The Catalyst
- Yearbook: Prowler
- Website: mwhs.mpsomaha.org

Millard West High School is a public high school located in Omaha, Nebraska, United States. It first opened its doors on August 17, 1995. Currently, Millard West High School is the third largest school within the Millard Public Schools district. In 2002, the school was designated as a National Blue Ribbon school of excellence. The school uses block scheduling, organizing the week into alternating "odd" and "even" days with four classes each and "all" days on Fridays. Students are enrolled in eight classes at a time, and classes change at the semester break.

In 2005, Millard voters approved the fourth-largest bond project in district history, providing $78 million for the construction of Horizon High School; renovations to all three high schools, one middle school and one elementary school; and the purchase of new land and technology. Of that, $6.2 million was appropriated to Millard West for the building of new classrooms and band room additions. These improvements were completed in the summer of 2007.

== Extracurriculars ==
=== State championships ===
State Championships
Season	Sport	Number of championships	Year
Fall	Marching band	4	2022, 2023, 2025, 2026
Fall	Football	2	2001, 2008
Fall	Cross country, boys'	4	2008, 2009, 2015, 2016
Fall	Cross country, girls'	3	2011, 2016, 2017
Winter	Swimming, girls'	5	2008, 2009, 2010, 2011, 2013
Winter	Bowling	1	2020
Winter	Cheerleading	15	2008, 2009, 2010, 2011, 2012, 2013, 2014, 2015, 2016, 2017, 2018, 2019, 2020, 2021, 2022, 2023
Winter	Dance	14	2008, 2009, 2010, 2011, 2012, 2013, 2014, 2015, 2017, 2018, 2019, 2020, 2021, 2022
Spring	Soccer, boys'	2	2009, 2015
Spring	Soccer, girls'	5	2007, 2009, 2013, 2015, 2019
Spring	Baseball	3	2019, 2022, 2024
Spring	Lacrosse, boys'	4	2007, 2009, 2014, 2016
Spring	Track and field, girls'	3	2012, 2013, 2017
Spring	Track and field, boys'	1	2016
Total		65	

=== National championships ===
National Championships
Season	Sport	Number of championships	Year
Winter	Cheerleading	12	2001, 2002, 2003, 2007, 2010, 2011, 2012, 2014, 2017, 2018, 2020, 2023
Total		12	

== Notable alumni ==
- Max Anderson - MLB player
- Dalys Beanum - NFL cornerback for the New Orleans Saints
- Chris Klein - Class of 1997; film actor (Election, Here on Earth, American Pie, Just Friends)
- Tyson Lewis - Cincinnati Reds Shortstop
- Matt Longacre - Los Angeles Rams Outside Linebacker
- Harrison Phillips - Minnesota Vikings Defensive Tackle
- Brett Lindstrom - Nebraska Cornhuskers quarterback and state Senator
