= Millard North High School =

Location
- 1010 S. 144th St. Omaha, Nebraska 68154-2899; United States; 41.250°N 96.141°W

Information
- Type: Public school
- Established: 1981
- School board: Millard Public Schools
- Principal: Aaron Bearinger
- Teaching staff: 148.50 (FTE)
- Enrollment: 2,534 (2023-2024)
- Student to teacher ratio: 17.06
- Colors: Blue, silver and green
- Fight song: Washington and Lee Swing
- Mascot: Mustangs
- Newspaper: The Hoofbeat
- Website: https://mnhs.mpsomaha.org/

Millard North High School is a high school in Omaha, Nebraska, United States. It is part of the Millard Public Schools district. Millard North partially opened in 1978 for 9th and 10th grade students. In 1981, the second phase of the project was completed and the school began to serve students in grades 9-12; at that time, the school's name was changed to Millard North High School. The school completed an expansion in 2007. Millard North underwent a comprehensive renovation which was finished in 2016.

== Curriculum ==
=== International Baccalaureate ===
Millard North is one of three public high schools in Nebraska to carry the International Baccalaureate Diploma Programme, and was the first in the state to offer it. Along with Millard North Middle School, Millard North High School offers the IB Middle Years Programme. The only other schools in Nebraska that offer the Diploma Programme are Lincoln High School in Lincoln and Omaha Central High School in Omaha.

=== Academies ===
Millard North is part of the Millard Public Schools System, which offers the Academy program for those students aspiring to a particular career after graduation. Currently, Millard North is home to the Business & Logistics Management Academy. Millard North sends students to the other three Millard high schools to participate in the other academies. Currently, there are five academies offered in the Millard district: Education at Millard West; Entrepreneurship at Millard South; Health Sciences at Horizon; and STEM at Millard West. Academy students graduate with almost a full year of college credit (though this varies by academy) and partake in the program during the junior and senior years of high school.

Millard North has had 48 students earn a perfect score on the ACT including a record 9 in the class of 2025.

== Extracurricular activities ==
=== State championships ===
State championships
Season	Activity	Number of championships	Year
Fall	Football	5	2003, 2005, 2010, 2012, 2015
Fall	Marching Band	1	2016
Fall	Softball	1	1993
Fall	Tennis, Boys'	2	1998, 2018
Fall	Volleyball	3	1987, 2016, 2018
Winter	Basketball, Boys'	2	2021, 2022
Winter	Speech	7	1993, 1996, 2017, 2018, 2019, 2021, 2022
Winter	Wrestling	2	1991, 1996
Winter	Winter Guard	1	2025
Winter	Basketball, Girls’	1	2019
Spring	Baseball	3	1990, 2005, 2026
Spring	Golf, Boys'	1	2011
Spring	Soccer, Boys'	2	1995, 2007
Spring	Soccer, Girls'	7	1988, 1994, 1997, 2006, 2008, 2011, 2018
Spring	Tennis, Girls'	3	1989, 2001, 2002
Spring	Track and field, Girls'	3	2005, 2006, 2008
Total		42	

=== Journalism ===
Millard North has two official student publications. The Hoofbeat, the newspaper, is published every three weeks and maintains an online website. The publication received the Cornhusker Award in 2011, 2015, 2016 and 2020. The Stampede, the school yearbook, is published in May with a supplement published in August. The Millard North journalism program won first place overall in the 2011, 2022, and 2025 Nebraska state competitions and were co-State Champions in 2012.

=== Nebraska Economics Challenge ===
Millard North operates an economics program, associated with the Advanced Placement Program, to compete in the Nebraska Economics Challenge. Millard North won four straight championships from 2011-2012 to 2014-2015.

=== National Personal Finance Challenge ===
The National Personal Finance Challenge (NPFC) is a nationwide competition that provides high school students the opportunity to build and demonstrate their knowledge of money management. Teams showcase their expertise in the concepts of earning income, buying goods and services, saving, using credit, investing, and protecting. In 2021, the champion team was from Millard North.

== Notable alumni ==
- Keith Ballard, retired NHL defenseman
- Lance Cade, professional wrestler
- Eric Crouch, football player, 2001 Heisman Trophy winner
- Nick DeLuca, Professional Football player
- Drew Dober, UFC fighter
- Todd Doxzon, football player 1999-2001 backup quarterback and special teams for Miami Dolphins
- Conor Gillaspie, baseball player, third baseman for the San Francisco Giants
- Kelly Lindsey, defender, USA Women's National Soccer Team, Women's United Soccer Association
- Ryan Malone, National Hockey League forward
- Erin McCarthy, professional ten-pin bowler, 2022 U.S. Women's Open champion
- Seth Olsen, football player, offensive lineman who has played for the Denver Broncos and Minnesota Vikings
- Hunter Sallis, basketball player for the Philadelphia 76ers
- Paul Stastny, former NHL player
- Jeff Tarpinian, football player, linebacker for the Houston Texans
- Saint Thomas, basketball player
- Patrick Tyrance, professional football player, Los Angeles Rams
- Caden VerMaas, college football safety for the Rice Owls
- Michael Zagurski, Major League Baseball pitcher
