= 2022–23 Dayton Flyers men's basketball team =

American college basketball season

2022–23 Dayton Flyers men's basketball
- Conference: Atlantic 10 Conference
- Record: 22–12 (12–6 A–10)
- Head coach: Anthony Grant (6th season)
- Associate head coach: Ricardo Greer (6th season)
- Assistant coaches: Darren Hertz (4th season); James Kane (3rd season)
- Home arena: UD Arena

2022–23 Atlantic 10 men's basketball standings
	Conf.				Overall
Team	W		L	PCT	W		L	PCT
VCU †	15	–	3	.833	27	–	8	.771
Fordham	12	–	6	.667	25	–	8	.758
Dayton	12	–	6	.667	22	–	12	.647
Saint Louis	12	–	6	.667	21	–	12	.636
George Mason	11	–	7	.611	20	–	13	.606
Duquesne	10	–	8	.556	20	–	13	.606
George Washington	10	–	8	.556	16	–	16	.500
Davidson	8	–	10	.444	16	–	16	.500
Saint Joseph's	8	–	10	.444	16	–	17	.485
St. Bonaventure	8	–	10	.444	14	–	18	.438
Richmond	7	–	11	.389	15	–	18	.455
La Salle	7	–	11	.389	15	–	19	.441
Massachusetts	6	–	12	.333	15	–	16	.484
Rhode Island	5	–	13	.278	9	–	22	.290
Loyola Chicago	4	–	14	.222	10	–	21	.323
† 2023 A10 tournament winner

The 2022–23 Dayton Flyers men's basketball team represented the University of Dayton in the 2022–23 NCAA Division I men's basketball season. They were led by head coach, Anthony Grant, in his sixth season with the Flyers. The Flyers played their home games at UD Arena in Dayton, Ohio as members of the Atlantic 10 Conference. They finished the season 20–11, 12–6 in A-10 Play to finish a three-way tie for 2nd place. They defeated Saint Joseph's in the quarterfinals of the Atlantic 10 tournament and Fordham in the semifinals before losing in the championship game to VCU. They preemptively declined any postseason invitations, making it unclear whether they were poised to join the National Invitation Tournament field.

== Previous season ==
The Flyers finished the 2021–22 season 24–11, 14–4 in A-10 play to finish in a tie for second place. As the No. 2 seed in the A-10 tournament, they defeated UMass in the quarterfinals before losing in the semifinals to Richmond. They were one of the last four teams not selected for the NCAA tournament and received an at-large bid to the National Invitation Tournament. There they defeated Toledo in the first round before losing in the second round to Vanderbilt.

== Offseason ==
=== Departures ===
Name	Number	Pos.	Height	Weight	Year	Hometown	Reason for departure
Elijah Weaver	0	G	6'6"	205	RS Junior	Cocoa, FL	Transferred to Chicago State
Lynn Greer III	3	G	6'3"	185	Freshman	Philadelphia, PA	Transferred to Saint Joseph's
Moulaye Sissoko	14	C	6'9"	240	RS Freshman	Bamako, Mali	Transferred to North Texas
Drew Swerlein	51	G	6'0"	190	Senior	Perrysburg, OH	Walk-on; Graduated
Christian Wilson	53	G	6'1"	175	RS Senior	Dayton, OH	Walk-on; Graduated

=== Incoming transfers ===
Name	Number	Pos.	Height	Weight	Year	Hometown	Previous school
Tyrone Baker	0	F	6'9"	205	Sophomore	Fort Myers, FL	Georgia

=== 2022 recruiting class ===
College recruiting information
Name	Hometown	School	Height	Weight	Commit date
Mike Sharavjamts #55 SF	Ulaanbaatar, Mongolia	Andrews Osborne Academy	6 ft 8 in (2.03 m)	180 lb (82 kg)	Dec 14, 2021
Mike Sharavjamts #55 SF	Recruit ratings: Scout: Rivals: 247Sports: ESPN:				
Overall recruit ranking:
Note: In many cases, Scout, Rivals, 247Sports, On3, and ESPN may conflict in their listings of height and weight.; In these cases, the average was taken. ESPN grades are on a 100-point scale.; Sources: "Dayton 2022 Basketball Commitments". Rivals.; "Dayton Flyers 2022 Player Commits". ESPN.; "2022 Team Ranking". Rivals.

== Roster ==
2022–23 Dayton Flyers men's basketball team
Players
Coaches

Pos.	#	Name	Height	Weight	Year	Previous school	Hometown
C	0	Tyrone Baker (redshirt)	6 ft 9 in (2.06 m)	205 lb (93 kg)	So	Georgia	Fort Meyers, FL
F	2	Toumani Camara	6 ft 8 in (2.03 m)	220 lb (100 kg)	Jr	Georgia	Brussels, Belgium
G	4	Koby Brea	6 ft 6 in (1.98 m)	206 lb (93 kg)	RS So	Monsignor Scanlan	Washington Heights, NY
F	10	Kaleb Washington (S)	6 ft 7 in (2.01 m)	190 lb (86 kg)	So	Wheeler	Mableton, GA
G	11	Malachi Smith (injured)	6 ft 0 in (1.83 m)	180 lb (82 kg)	So	St. Raymond School For Boys	The Bronx, NY
F	12	Zimi Nwojeki	6 ft 7 in (2.01 m)	210 lb (95 kg)	RS So	SPIRE Academy	Quincy, FL
F	15	DaRon Holmes II	6 ft 10 in (2.08 m)	231 lb (105 kg)	So	AZ Compass Prep	Goodyear, AZ
F	21	Richard Amaefule	6 ft 9 in (2.06 m)	224 lb (102 kg)	RS So	East Tennessee State	London, England
F	22	Mustapha Amzil	6 ft 10 in (2.08 m)	224 lb (102 kg)	Jr	HBA-Marsky	Helsinki, Finland
G/F	23	R. J. Blakney	6 ft 6 in (1.98 m)	195 lb (88 kg)	RS So	Loomis Chaffee School	Baltimore, MD
G	24	Kobe Elvis (injured)	6 ft 2 in (1.88 m)	170 lb (77 kg)	RS So	DePaul	Brampton, ON
G	42	Brady Uhl (W)	6 ft 1 in (1.85 m)	190 lb (86 kg)	RS So	Alter	Dayton, OH
G	50	Ty Locklear (W)	6 ft 1 in (1.85 m)	180 lb (82 kg)	Fr	Oberlin	Oberlin, OH
G	52	Cole Hatkevich (W)	5 ft 9 in (1.75 m)	165 lb (75 kg)	Fr	St. Joseph	Granger, IN
G/F	54	Atticus Schuler (W)	6 ft 6 in (1.98 m)	190 lb (86 kg)	Fr	St. Francis De Sales	Westerville, OH
G/F	55	Mike Sharavjamts	6 ft 8 in (2.03 m)	180 lb (82 kg)	Fr	International Sports Academy	Ulaanbaatar, Mongolia

Head coach

- Anthony Grant (Dayton)

Assistant coach(es)

- Ricardo Greer (Pittsburgh)
- Darren Hertz (Florida)
- James Kane (Florida)

Legend

- (C) Team captain
- (S) Suspended
- (I) Ineligible
- (W) Walk-on
- Injured
- Current redshirt

Roster
Last update: December 13, 2022

== Schedule and results ==
Date time, TV	Rank^{#}	Opponent^{#}	Result	Record	High points	High rebounds	High assists	Site (attendance) city, state
Exhibition
October 29, 2022*; 7:00 p.m.	No. 24	Capital	W 80–42		16 – Camara	9 – Camara	5 – Elvis	UD Arena (13,407); Dayton, OH
Non-conference regular season
November 7, 2022*; 7:00 p.m., SPEC1	No. 24	Lindenwood	W 73–46	1–0	14 – Amzil	11 – Camara	5 – Elvis	UD Arena (13,407); Dayton, OH
November 11, 2022*; 7:00 p.m., BSOH	No. 24	SMU	W 74–62	2–0	20 – Tied	18 – Camara	5 – Elvis	UD Arena (13,407); Dayton, OH
November 15, 2022*; 11:00 p.m., CBSSN	No. 21	at UNLV	L 52–60	2–1	16 – Elvis	7 – Tied	3 – Amzil	Thomas & Mack Center (5,732); Paradise, NV
November 19, 2022*; 1:00 p.m., SPEC1	No. 21	Robert Morris	W 60–51	3–1	18 – Holmes II	14 – Camara	4 – Holmes II	UD Arena (13,407); Dayton, OH
November 23, 2022*; 2:30 p.m., ESPN2		vs. Wisconsin; Battle 4 Atlantis quarterfinal	L 42–43	3–2	16 – Elvis	11 – Camara	2 – Smith	Imperial Arena (1,047); Nassau, Bahamas
November 24, 2022*; 4:20 p.m., ESPNews		vs. NC State; Battle 4 Atlantis	L 64–76	3–3	19 – Camara	7 – Camara	6 – Smith	Imperial Arena (613); Nassau, Bahamas
November 25, 2022*; 3:30 p.m., ESPNU		vs. BYU; Battle 4 Atlantis	L 75–79 ^{OT}	3–4	21 – Holmes	9 – Holmes	7 – Smith	Imperial Arena (715); Nassau, Bahamas
November 30, 2022*; 7:00 p.m., SPEC1		Western Michigan	W 67–47	4–4	24 – Holmes II	10 – Tied	8 – Sharavjamts	UD Arena (13,407); Dayton, OH
December 3, 2022*; 2:00 p.m., ESPN+		Southeastern Louisiana	W 80–74	5–4	20 – Camara	12 – Holmes II	8 – Sharavjamts	UD Arena (13,407); Dayton, OH
December 7, 2022*; 8:00 p.m., ACCN		at Virginia Tech	L 49–77	5–5	13 – Holmes II	10 – Holmes II	2 – Tied	Cassell Coliseum (7,702); Blacksburg, VA
December 10, 2022*; 2:00 p.m., USA		UNC Asheville	W 79–56	6–5	27 – Holmes II	12 – Holmes II	8 – Sharavjamts	UD Arena (13,407); Dayton, OH
December 17, 2022*; 8:00 p.m., CBSSN		vs. Wyoming; Legends of Basketball Showcase	W 66–49	7–5	24 – Holmes II	9 – Camara	4 – Tied	United Center; Chicago, IL
December 20, 2022*; 7:00 p.m., SPEC1/ESPN+		Alcorn State	W 88–46	8–5	23 – Holmes III	13 – Camara	8 – Amzil	UD Arena (13,407); Dayton, OH
Atlantic 10 Regular Season
December 28, 2022; 7:00 p.m., SPEC1/ESPN+		Duquesne	W 69–57	9–5 (1–0)	22 – Holmes II	13 – Holmes II	5 – Amzil	UD Arena (13,407); Dayton, OH
December 31, 2022; 2:00 p.m., ESPN+		at Davidson	W 69–55	10–5 (2–0)	32 – Holmes II	10 – Tied	4 – Holmes II	John M. Belk Arena (3,953); Davidson, NC
January 4, 2023; 7:00 p.m., SPEC1		Saint Joseph's	W 76–56	11–5 (3–0)	20 – Holmes II	12 – Holmes II	6 – Camara	UD Arena (13,407); Dayton, OH
January 10, 2023; 7:00 p.m., ESPN+		at Fordham	W 82-58	12–5 (4–0)	32 – Holmes II	8 – Camara	5 – Tied	Rose Hill Gymnasium (1,700); The Bronx, NY
January 13, 2023; 9:00 p.m., ESPN2		VCU	L 62–63	12–6 (4–1)	27 – Camara	11 – Camara	5 – Sharavjamts	UD Arena (13,407); Dayton, OH
January 17, 2023; 7:00 p.m., CBSSN		Davidson	W 68–61	13–6 (5–1)	19 – Amzil	5 – Tied	7 – Sharavjamts	UD Arena (13,407); Dayton, OH
January 21, 2023; 12:30 p.m., USA		at George Washington	L 69–76	13–7 (5–2)	16 – Camara	10 – Holmes II	3 – Smith	Charles E. Smith Center (2,380); Washington, D.C.
January 25, 2023; 7:00 p.m., CBSSN		at Rhode Island	L 70–75	13–8 (5–3)	19 – Holmes II	6 – Camara	5 – Smith	Ryan Center (5,743); Kingston, RI
January 28, 2023; 4:00 p.m., CBSSN		Richmond	W 86–60	14–8 (6–3)	18 – Brea	9 – Holmes II	13 – Smith	UD Arena (13,407); Dayton, OH
January 31, 2023; 9:00 p.m., CBSSN		Loyola Chicago	W 85–81 ^{OT}	15–8 (7–3)	31 – Camara	9 – Camara	8 – Smith	UD Arena (13,407); Dayton, OH
February 4, 2023; 8:00 p.m., ESPNU		at St. Bonaventure	L 59–68	15–9 (7–4)	21 – Holmes II	17 – Camara	6 – Elvis	Reilly Center (4,850); Olean, NY
February 7, 2023; 7:00 p.m., CBSSN		at VCU	W 62–58	16–9 (8–4)	26 – Camara	15 – Camara	4 – Tied	Siegel Center (7,637); Richmond, VA
February 10, 2023; 8:00 p.m., ESPN2		Saint Louis	W 70–56	17–9 (9–4)	17 – Camara	10 – Camara	6 – Smith	UD Arena (13,407); Dayton, OH
February 17, 2023; 7:00 p.m., ESPN2		at Loyola Chicago	W 65–49	18–9 (10–4)	20 – Holmes II	10 – Holmes II	7 – Elvis	Joseph J. Gentile Arena (4,557); Chicago, IL
February 22, 2023; 7:00 p.m., CBSSN		at UMass	W 72–54	19–9 (11–4)	22 – Holmes II	8 – Amzil	8 – Smith	Mullins Center (3,642); Amherst, MA
February 25, 2023; 6:00 p.m., ESPNU		George Mason	L 69–74	19–10 (11–5)	34 – Holmes II	6 – Tied	5 – Smith	UD Arena (13,407); Dayton, OH
February 28, 2023; 7:00 p.m., NBC Digital		La Salle	W 77–53	20–10 (12–5)	16 – Holmes II	10 – Holmes II	10 – Smith	UD Arena (13,407); Dayton, OH
March 3, 2023; 7:00 p.m., ESPN2		at Saint Louis	L 61–65	20–11 (12–6)	13 – Tied	6 – Tied	6 – Smith	Chaifetz Arena (9,699); St. Louis, MO
A-10 tournament
March 9, 2023; 5:00 p.m., USA	(2)	vs. (10) Saint Joseph's; Quarterfinals	W 60–54	21–11	17 – Tied	18 – Camara	4 – Smith	Barclays Center; Brooklyn, NY
March 11, 2023; 3:30 p.m., CBSSN	(2)	vs. (3) Fordham; Semifinals	W 78–68	22–11	28 – Camara	8 – Amzil	7 – Smith	Barclays Center (10,156); Brooklyn, NY
March 12, 2023; 1:00 p.m., CBS/Paramount+	(2)	vs. (1) VCU; Championship	L 56–68	22–12	28 – Holmes II	16 – Holmes II	3 – Smith	Barclays Center; Brooklyn, NY
*Non-conference game. ^{#}Rankings from AP Poll. (#) Tournament seedings in parentheses. All times are in Eastern Time.

== Rankings ==
Ranking movements Legend: ██ Increase in ranking ██ Decrease in ranking RV = Received votes
	Week																			
Poll	Pre	1	2	3	4	5	6	7	8	9	10	11	12	13	14	15	16	17	18	Final
AP	24	21	RV																	Not released
Coaches	25	23	RV																	

*AP does not release post-NCAA tournament rankings.
