= 2022–23 Saint Louis Billikens men's basketball team =

American college basketball season

2022–23 Saint Louis Billikens men's basketball
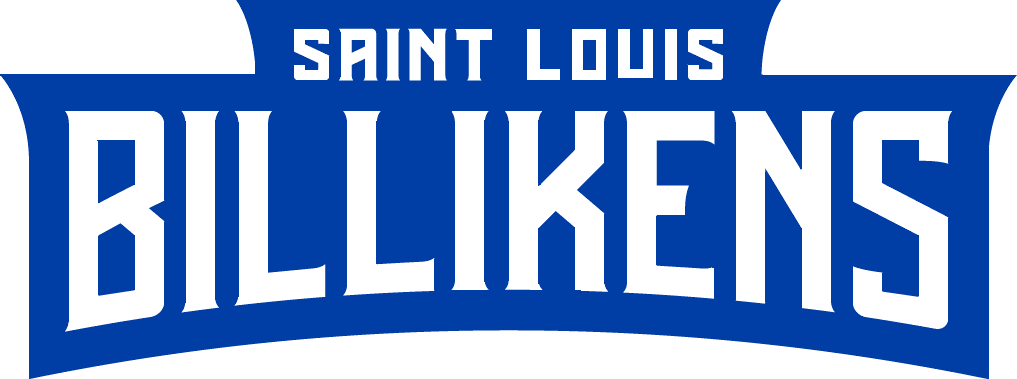
- Conference: Atlantic 10 Conference
- Record: 21–12 (12–6 A–10)
- Head coach: Travis Ford (7th season)
- Associate head coach: Corey Tate
- Assistant coaches: Will Bailey; Phil Forte
- Home arena: Chaifetz Arena

2022–23 Atlantic 10 men's basketball standings
	Conf.				Overall
Team	W		L	PCT	W		L	PCT
VCU †	15	–	3	.833	27	–	8	.771
Fordham	12	–	6	.667	25	–	8	.758
Dayton	12	–	6	.667	22	–	12	.647
Saint Louis	12	–	6	.667	21	–	12	.636
George Mason	11	–	7	.611	20	–	13	.606
Duquesne	10	–	8	.556	20	–	13	.606
George Washington	10	–	8	.556	16	–	16	.500
Davidson	8	–	10	.444	16	–	16	.500
Saint Joseph's	8	–	10	.444	16	–	17	.485
St. Bonaventure	8	–	10	.444	14	–	18	.438
Richmond	7	–	11	.389	15	–	18	.455
La Salle	7	–	11	.389	15	–	19	.441
Massachusetts	6	–	12	.333	15	–	16	.484
Rhode Island	5	–	13	.278	9	–	22	.290
Loyola Chicago	4	–	14	.222	10	–	21	.323
† 2023 A10 tournament winner

The 2022–23 Saint Louis Billikens men's basketball team represented Saint Louis University during the 2022–23 NCAA Division I men's basketball season. Their head coach was Travis Ford who was in his seventh season at Saint Louis. The team played their home games at Chaifetz Arena as a member of the Atlantic 10 Conference.

== Previous season ==
The Billikens finished the 2021–22 season 23–12, 12–6 in A-10 Play to finish in fifth place. They defeated La Salle and St. Bonaventure to advance to the semifinals of the A-10 tournament where they lost to Davidson. They received an at-large bid to the National Invitation Tournament where they lost in the first round to Northern Iowa.

== Offseason ==
=== Departures ===
Name	Number	Pos.	Height	Weight	Year	Hometown	Reason for departure
Markhi Stickland	2	G/F	6'5"	210	Freshman	Miami, FL	Transferred to Victoria College
Rashad Williams	11	G	6'2"	185	Junior	Detroit, MI	Transferred to Arkansas–Pine Bluff
Marten Linssen	12	F	6'8"	240	RS Junior	Düsseldorf, Germany	Graduated/Signed with Uni Baskets Padeborn in Germany

=== Incoming transfers ===
Name	Number	Pos.	Height	Weight	Year	Hometown	Previous School
Javon Pickett	4	G	6'6"	215	Senior	Belleville, IL	Missouri
Jake Forrester	10	F	6'9"	225	Senior	Harrisburg, PA	Temple
Daniel Rivera	11	F	6'6"	210	Sophomore	San Juan, PR	Odessa College
Sincere Parker	21	G	6'4"	190	Sophomore	Rockford, IL	Moberly Area CC
Lamont Evans IV	33	G	6'1"	155	Sophomore	Hollywood, FL	South Florida

=== Recruiting classes ===
==== 2022 recruiting class ====
College recruiting information
Name	Hometown	School	Height	Weight	Commit date
Nick Kramer; SG	Saint Louis, MO	Saint Louis University High School	6 ft 4 in (1.93 m)	180 lb (82 kg)	Jun 22, 2021
Nick Kramer; SG	Recruit ratings: (NR)				
Kellen Thames; SG	Maryland Heights, MO	Pattonville High School	6 ft 6 in (1.98 m)	185 lb (84 kg)	Jul 8, 2021
Kellen Thames; SG	Recruit ratings: Rivals: (NR)				
Larry Hughes Jr. SG	Saint Louis, MO	Christian Brothers College High School	6 ft 4 in (1.93 m)	165 lb (75 kg)	Apr 12, 2022
Larry Hughes Jr. SG	Recruit ratings: 247Sports: (NR)				
Mouhamadou Cisse; C	Dakar, Senegal	Putnam Science Academy	7 ft 0 in (2.13 m)	245 lb (111 kg)	May 19, 2022
Mouhamadou Cisse; C	Recruit ratings: 247Sports: (NR)				
Overall recruit ranking:
Note: In many cases, Scout, Rivals, 247Sports, On3, and ESPN may conflict in their listings of height and weight.; In these cases, the average was taken. ESPN grades are on a 100-point scale.; Sources: "2022 Team Ranking". Rivals.

==== 2023 recruiting class ====
College recruiting information (2022)
Name	Hometown	School	Height	Weight	Commit date
Cian Medley; PG	Camden, NJ	Camden High School	6 ft 0 in (1.83 m)	150 lb (68 kg)	Jul 12, 2022
Cian Medley; PG	Recruit ratings: No ratings found				
Brock Vice; C	Germantown, TN	Houston High School	6 ft 10 in (2.08 m)	225 lb (102 kg)	Aug 9, 2022
Brock Vice; C	Recruit ratings: No ratings found				
Bruce Zhang; C	Beijing, China	Skill Factory	7 ft 1 in (2.16 m)	250 lb (110 kg)	Nov 15, 2022
Bruce Zhang; C	Recruit ratings: No ratings found				
Overall recruit ranking:
Note: In many cases, Scout, Rivals, 247Sports, On3, and ESPN may conflict in their listings of height and weight.; In these cases, the average was taken. ESPN grades are on a 100-point scale.; Sources: "2023 Team Ranking". Rivals.

== Roster ==
2022–23 Saint Louis Billikens men's basketball team
Players
Coaches

Pos.	#	Name	Height	Weight	Year	Previous school	Hometown
G	0	Kellen Thames	6 ft 5 in (1.96 m)	200 lb (91 kg)	Fr	Pattonville	St. Louis, MO
G	1	Yuri Collins	6 ft 0 in (1.83 m)	190 lb (86 kg)	Jr	St. Mary’s	St. Louis, MO
G	2	Larry Hughes Jr. (W)	6 ft 4 in (1.93 m)	175 lb (79 kg)	Fr	CBC	St. Louis, MO
G/F	3	Javonte Perkins	6 ft 6 in (1.98 m)	205 lb (93 kg)	RS Sr	Miller Career Academy; Southwestern Illinois College	St. Louis, MO
G	4	Javon Pickett	6 ft 5 in (1.96 m)	215 lb (98 kg)	Sr	Belleville East; Missouri	Belleville, IL
F	5	Francis Okoro	6 ft 9 in (2.06 m)	230 lb (104 kg)	RS Sr	Normal West; Oregon	Imo, Nigeria
F	10	Jake Forrester	6 ft 9 in (2.06 m)	225 lb (102 kg)	Sr	Westtown School; Indiana/Temple	Harrisburg, PA
F	11	Daniel Rivera (injured) (redshirt)	6 ft 6 in (1.98 m)	210 lb (95 kg)	So	Odessa College	San Juan, PR
G	13	Nick Kramer (redshirt)	6 ft 3 in (1.91 m)	210 lb (95 kg)	Fr	SLUH	St. Louis, MO
G	20	Fred Thatch Jr. (injured)	6 ft 3 in (1.91 m)	215 lb (98 kg)	RS Jr	Sikeston	Sikeston, MO
G	21	Sincere Parker	6 ft 3 in (1.91 m)	195 lb (88 kg)	So	Rockford East; Moberly Area Community College	Rockford, IL
F	22	Terrence Hargrove Jr.	6 ft 4 in (1.93 m)	215 lb (98 kg)	Jr	East St. Louis	East St. Louis, IL
G	24	Gibson Jimerson	6 ft 5 in (1.96 m)	205 lb (93 kg)	RS So	Montverde Academy	Richmond, VA
G	25	Phil Jones (W)	6 ft 1 in (1.85 m)	185 lb (84 kg)	Fr	Mount Carmel	Chicago, IL
G	33	Lamont Evans IV (W)	6 ft 0 in (1.83 m)	155 lb (70 kg)	So	Blanche Ely; South Florida	Hollywood, FL
C	35	Mouhamadou Cisse	6 ft 10 in (2.08 m)	210 lb (95 kg)	Fr	Putnam Science Academy	Dakar, Senegal

Head coach

- Travis Ford (Kentucky)

Assistant coach(es)

- Corey Tate (Missouri)
- Will Bailey(UAB)
- Phil Forte (Oklahoma State)

Legend

- (C) Team captain
- (S) Suspended
- (I) Ineligible
- (W) Walk-on
- Injured
- Current redshirt

Roster
Last update: 1/9/2023

== Schedule and results ==
Date time, TV	Rank^{#}	Opponent^{#}	Result	Record	High points	High rebounds	High assists	Site (attendance) city, state
Exhibition
October 24, 2022*; 7:00 p.m.		UMSL	W 81–58		15 – Tied	7 – Parker	7 – Collins	Chaifetz Arena; St. Louis, MO
Non-conference regular season
November 7, 2022*; 7:00 p.m., BSMWX		Murray State	W 91–68	1–0	21 – Perkins	13 – Pickett	14 – Collins	Chaifetz Arena (7,253); St. Louis, MO
November 12, 2022*; 6:00 p.m., BSMW		Evansville	W 83–65	2–0	18 – Jimerson	13 – Pickett	13 – Collins	Chaifetz Arena (7,020); St. Louis, MO
November 15, 2022*; 8:00 p.m., CBSSN		Memphis	W 90–84	3–0	22 – Collins	11 – Okoro	9 – Collins	Chaifetz Arena (7,925); St. Louis, MO
November 19, 2022*; 12:00 p.m., ESPNews		vs. Maryland; Hall of Fame Tip Off semifinals	L 67–95	3–1	17 – Perkins	8 – Parker	6 – Collins	Mohegan Sun Arena; Uncasville, CT
November 20, 2022*; 2:30 p.m., ESPNU		vs. Providence; Hall of Fame Tip Off 3rd place game	W 76–73	4–1	21 – Collins	9 – Okoro	7 – Collins	Mohegan Sun Arena; Uncasville, CT
November 23, 2022*; 7:00 p.m., ESPN+		Paul Quinn	W 96–53	5–1	16 – Jimerson	7 – Tied	15 – Collins	Chaifetz Arena (5,343); St. Louis, MO
November 27, 2022*; 2:00 p.m., SECN		at No. 13 Auburn	L 60–65	5–2	16 – Pickett	7 – Okoro	9 – Collins	Neville Arena (9,121); Auburn, AL
November 30, 2022*; 8:00 p.m., BSMW		Tennessee State	W 80–63	6–2	15 – Tied	8 – Collins	20 – Collins	Chaifetz Arena (5,025); St. Louis, MO
December 3, 2022*; 3:00 p.m., BSMW		Southern Illinois	W 85–72	7–2	23 – Pickett	6 – Pickett	14 – Collins	Chaifetz Arena (7,024); St. Louis, MO
December 6, 2022*; 6:00 p.m., ESPN+		at Iona	L 62–84	7–3	15 – Jimerson	14 – Okoro	4 – Collins	Hynes Athletic Center (2,171); New Rochelle, NY
December 10, 2022*; 7:00 p.m., BSMW		Boise State	L 52–57	7–4	17 – Collins	12 – Okoro	4 – Collins	Chaifetz Arena; St. Louis, MO
December 17, 2022*; 7:00 p.m., BSMW		Drake	W 83–75	8–4	17 – Tied	15 – Okoro	9 – Collins	Chaifetz Arena (7,251); St. Louis, MO
December 21, 2022*; 7:00 p.m., BSMW		SIU Edwardsville	L 67–69	8–5	23 – Perkins	6 – Tied	10 – Collins	Chaifetz Arena (7,876); St. Louis, MO
Atlantic 10 regular season
December 31, 2022; 12:00 p.m., ESPN+		at Saint Joseph's	W 83–78	9–5 (1–0)	22 – Jimerson	7 – Collins	15 – Collins	Hagan Arena (1,382); Philadelphia, PA
January 4, 2023; 6:30 p.m., ESPN+		at UMass	L 81–90	9–6 (1–1)	16 – Collins	7 – Hargrove Jr.	10 – Collins	Mullins Center (3,449); Amherst, MA
January 7, 2023; 3:00 p.m., BSMW		St. Bonaventure	W 78–55	10–6 (2–1)	13 – Jimerson	7 – Tied	14 – Collins	Chaifetz Arena (8,219); St. Louis, MO
January 11, 2023; 7:00 p.m., BSMW		George Mason	W 63–62	11–6 (3–1)	16 – Jimerson	7 – Okoro	12 – Collins	Chaifetz Arena (5,238); St. Louis, MO
January 14, 2023; 3:00 p.m., ESPN+		at George Washington	W 81–74	12–6 (4–1)	27 – Perkins	10 – Forrester	4 – Pickett	Charles E. Smith Center (1,706); Washington, D.C.
January 18, 2023; 6:00 p.m., CBSSN		at Loyola Chicago	W 76–59	13–6 (5–1)	18 – Perkins	10 – Okoro	7 – Jimerson	Joseph J. Gentile Arena (4,038); Chicago, IL
January 21, 2023; 1:30 p.m., USA		La Salle	W 84–71	14–6 (6–1)	20 – Parker	20 – Okoro	11 – Collins	Chaifetz Arena (7,523); St. Louis, MO
January 27, 2023; 6:00 p.m., ESPN2		at Davidson	W 74–70	15–6 (7–1)	14 – Pickett	8 – Forrester	10 – Collins	John M. Belk Arena (4,406); Davidson, NC
January 31, 2023; 6:00 p.m., BSMW		at Fordham	L 65–75	15–7 (7–2)	21 – Okoro	11 – Okoro	2 – Okoro	Rose Hill Gymnasium (1,800); Bronx, NY
February 3, 2023; 6:00 p.m., ESPN2		VCU	L 65–73	15–8 (7–3)	24 – Jimerson	5 – Tied	11 – Collins	Chaifetz Arena (9,230); St. Louis, MO
February 7, 2023; 8:00 p.m., CBSSN		Rhode Island	W 76–71	16–8 (8–3)	24 – Jimerson	9 – Hargrove Jr.	8 – Collins	Chaifetz Arena (5,012); St. Louis, MO
February 10, 2023; 7:00 p.m., ESPN2		at Dayton	L 56–70	16–9 (8–4)	17 – Perkins	4 – Tied	6 – Collins	UD Arena (13,407); Dayton, Ohio
February 15, 2023; 8:00 p.m., CBSSN		Davidson	W 78–65	17–9 (9–4)	24 – Jimerson	11 – Forrester	11 – Collins	Chaifetz Arena (5,168); St. Louis, MO
February 18, 2023; 7:00 p.m., BSMW		Duquesne	W 90–85	18–9 (10–4)	28 – Jimerson	16 – Okoro	9 – Collins	Chaifetz Arena (7,519); St. Louis, MO
February 21, 2022; 6:00 p.m., ESPN+		at Richmond	L 78–81	18–10 (10–5)	28 – Perkins	14 – Okoro	17 – Collins	Robins Center (6,022); Richmond, VA
February 25, 2023; 5:00 p.m., CBSSN		Loyola Chicago	W 81–62	19–10 (11–5)	21 – Jimerson	6 – Tied	11 – Collins	Chaifetz Arena (8,175); St. Louis, MO
February 28, 2023; 6:00 p.m., CBSSN		at VCU	L 67–79	19–11 (11–6)	15 – Hargrove Jr.	10 – Forrester	8 – Collins	Siegel Center (7,637); Richmond, VA
March 3, 2023; 6:00 p.m., ESPN2		Dayton	W 65–61	20–11 (12–6)	17 – Perkins	9 – Pickett	10 – Collins	Chaifetz Arena (9,699); St. Louis, MO
A-10 tournament
March 9, 2023; 1:00 p.m., USA	(4)	vs. (5) George Mason; Quarterfinals	W 82–54	21–11	21 – Jimerson	7 – Okoro	10 – Collins	Barclays Center; Brooklyn, NY
March 11, 2023; 1:00 p.m., CBSSN	(4)	vs. (1) VCU; Semifinals	L 78–90	21–12	18 – Pickett	8 – Forrester	10 – Collins	Barclays Center; Brooklyn, NY
*Non-conference game. ^{#}Rankings from AP Poll. (#) Tournament seedings in parentheses. All times are in Central Time.

== Rankings ==
Ranking movements Legend: ██ Increase in ranking ██ Decrease in ranking — = Not ranked RV = Received votes
	Week																			
Poll	Pre	1	2	3	4	5	6	7	8	9	10	11	12	13	14	15	16	17	18	Final
AP	RV	RV	RV	—	—	—	—	—	—	—	—	—	RV							Not released
Coaches	—	RV	RV	—	—	—	—	—	—	—	—	—	RV							

*AP does not release post-NCAA Tournament rankings
