= Harrison Phillips =

American football player (born 1996)

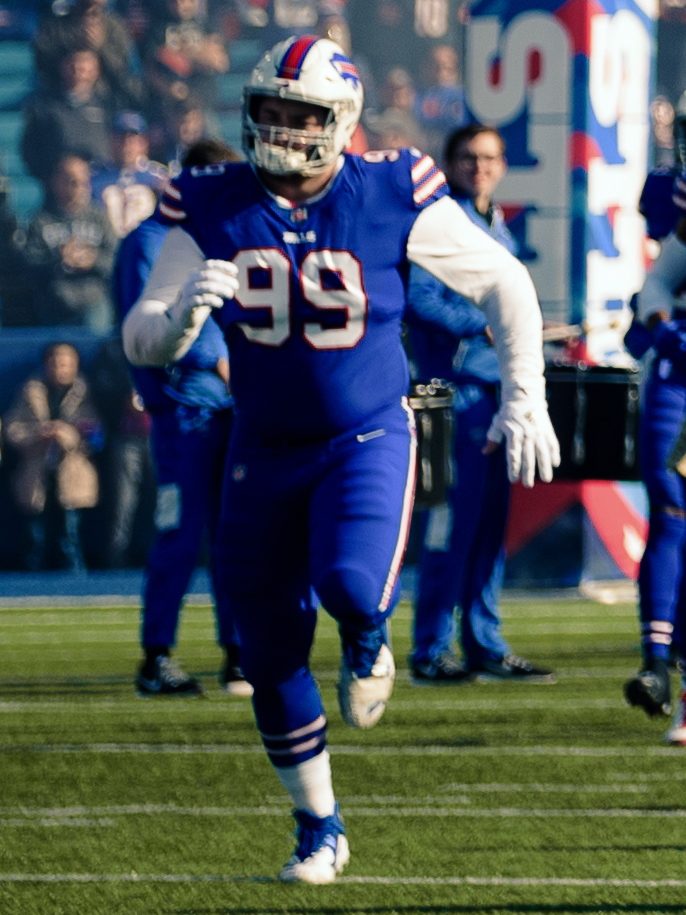
- Phillips with the Buffalo Bills in 2018

No. 97 – New York Jets
- Position: Nose tackle
- Roster status: Active

Personal information
- Born: January 25, 1996 (age 30); Omaha, Nebraska, U.S.
- Listed height: 6 ft 3 in (1.91 m)
- Listed weight: 307 lb (139 kg)

Career information
- High school: Millard West (Omaha, Nebraska)
- College: Stanford (2014–2017)
- NFL draft: 2018: 3rd round, 96th overall pick

Career history
- Buffalo Bills (2018–2021); Minnesota Vikings (2022–2024); New York Jets (2025–present)

Awards and highlights
- First-team All-Pac-12 (2017)

Career NFL statistics as of Week 5, 2026
- Total tackles: 387
- Sacks: 8.5
- Forced fumbles: 2
- Fumble recoveries: 6
- Pass deflections: 12
- Stats at Pro Football Reference

Harrison Foster Phillips (born January 25, 1996) is an American professional football nose tackle for the New York Jets of the National Football League (NFL). He played college football for the Stanford Cardinal.

== Early life ==
Phillips was born in Omaha, Nebraska on January 25, 1996. He attended Millard West High School in Omaha, Nebraska, where he played high school football. As a senior, he was the Nebraska Gatorade Football Player of the Year. He committed to Stanford University to play college football. In his high school career, he had over 175 tackles, 35 sacks, and 75 tackles-for-loss.

== College career ==
Phillips played college football at Stanford University from 2014 to 2017. He played in only one game as a sophomore in 2015 after tearing his ACL, and redshirted. In 2017, he led all linemen in the Football Bowl Subdivision with 103 tackles and earned All-Pac-12 First-team and Pac-12 All-Academic First-team honors. He was also invited to play in the 2018 Senior Bowl. Having graduated with a double major in Sociology and Science, Technology and Society, and a minor in Education in December 2017, Phillips decided to forgo his last year of eligibility and enter the 2018 NFL draft.

== Professional career ==
=== Pre-draft ===
On November 20, 2017, it was announced that Phillips had accepted his invitation to play in the Senior Bowl. On January 4, 2018, Phillips officially announced his decision to forgo his remaining year of eligibility and enter the 2018 NFL draft. He was eligible to return as a fifth-year senior after missing the majority of his sophomore season due to an ankle injury he sustained in the season-opener. Phillips practiced well throughout preparations for the game and impressed scouts and analysts. On January 27, 2018, Phillips played in the 2018 Reese's Senior Bowl and was part of Denver Broncos head coach Vance Joseph's North team that lost 45–16 to the South. He attended the NFL Scouting Combine in Indianapolis and performed all of the combine drills. Phillips finished first among any player in the bench press with 42 repetitions.

External videos
- Harrison Phillip's NFL Combine Workout
- Harrison Phillips' 40-yard dash
- Phillips puts up 42 reps on the bench press

On March 27, 2018, Phillips participated at Stanford's pro day, but opted to stand on his combine numbers and only performed positional drills. At the conclusion of the pre-draft process, Phillips was projected to be a second round pick by NFL draft experts and scouts. He was ranked as the fourth best defensive tackle by Scouts Inc., was ranked the fifth best defensive tackle by DraftScout.com and NFL analyst Mike Mayock, and was ranked the sixth best defensive tackle by Sports Illustrated.

Pre-draft measurables
Height	Weight	Arm length	Hand span	Wingspan	40-yard dash	10-yard split	20-yard split	20-yard shuttle	Three-cone drill	Vertical jump	Broad jump	Bench press
6 ft 3 1/4 in (1.91 m)	307 lb (139 kg)	33 7/8 in (0.86 m)	10 3/8 in (0.26 m)	6 ft 8 1/2 in (2.04 m)	5.21 s	1.79 s	3.00 s	4.50 s	7.28 s	32.0 in (0.81 m)	8 ft 7 in (2.62 m)	42 reps
All values from NFL Combine

=== Buffalo Bills ===
The Buffalo Bills selected Phillips in the third round (96th overall) of the 2018 NFL Draft. Phillips was the tenth defensive tackle drafted in 2018.

The Bills previously acquired the pick used to select Phillips along with Jordan Matthews in a trade with the Philadelphia Eagles.

On May 30, 2018, the Bills signed Phillips to a four-year, $3.34 million contract that includes a signing bonus of $775,040. Phillips played a reserve role as a 1-tech tackle during his rookie season, alternating snaps with Star Lotulelei, Kyle Williams, and Jordan Phillips.

In his second year, Phillips recorded his first career sack against the New York Giants, taking down Eli Manning during a 28–14 Bills win. In Week 3, Phillips suffered a torn ACL and was ruled out for the season. He was placed on injured reserve on September 24, 2019.

=== Minnesota Vikings ===
On March 16, 2022, Phillips signed a three-year, $19.5 million contract with the Minnesota Vikings. He started all 17 games in 2022, recording 59 tackles and 1.5 sacks. Phillips followed up his strong 2022 season by setting career-highs in 2023, recording 92 tackles and three sacks.

On September 10, 2024, Phillips signed a two-year extension with the Vikings, keeping him under contract through the 2026 season.

=== New York Jets ===
On August 21, 2025, Phillips and a 2027 seventh-round pick were traded to the New York Jets in exchange for 2026 and 2027 sixth round picks.

== NFL career statistics ==
Legend
**Bold**	Career high

=== Regular season ===
Year	Team	Games		Tackles					Interceptions						Fumbles				
Year	Team	GP	GS	Cmb	Solo	Ast	Sck	TFL	Int	Yds	Avg	Lng	TD	PD	FF	Fum	FR	Yds	TD
2018	BUF	16	0	35	20	15	0.0	4	0	0	0.0	0	0	0	0	0	**1**	0	0
2019	BUF	3	0	3	1	2	0.5	0	0	0	0.0	0	0	2	0	0	0	0	0
2020	BUF	12	3	18	11	7	0.0	0	0	0	0.0	0	0	0	0	0	**1**	0	0
2021	BUF	14	8	51	28	23	1.0	4	0	0	0.0	0	0	1	0	0	**1**	0	0
2022	MIN	17	17	59	28	31	1.5	3	0	0	0.0	0	0	1	0	0	**1**	0	0
2023	MIN	17	17	**92**	**44**	**48**	**3.0**	2	0	0	0.0	0	0	2	0	0	0	0	0
2024	MIN	17	17	56	16	40	2.0	2	0	0	0.0	0	0	**4**	**1**	0	**1**	0	0
2025	NYJ	17	17	60	22	38	0.5	**5**	0	0	0.0	0	0	2	**1**	0	0	0	0
2026	NYJ	5	5	13	4	9	0.0	0	0	0	0.0	0	0	0	0	0	**1**	0	0
Career		118	84	387	174	213	8.5	20	0	0	0.0	0	0	12	2	0	6	0	0

=== Postseason ===
Year	Team	Games		Tackles					Interceptions						Fumbles				
Year	Team	GP	GS	Cmb	Solo	Ast	Sck	TFL	Int	Yds	Avg	Lng	TD	PD	FF	Fum	FR	Yds	TD
2020	BUF	3	0	**9**	4	**5**	0.0	0	0	0	0.0	0	0	0	0	0	0	0	0
2021	BUF	2	2	7	**6**	1	0.0	0	0	0	0.0	0	0	0	0	0	0	0	0
2022	MIN	1	1	3	2	1	0.0	0	0	0	0.0	0	0	**1**	0	0	0	0	0
2024	MIN	1	1	1	0	1	0.0	0	0	0	0.0	0	0	0	0	0	0	0	0
Career		7	4	20	12	8	0.0	0	0	0	0.0	0	0	1	0	0	0	0	0
