= 2022–23 VCU Rams men's basketball team =

American college basketball season

2022–23 VCU Rams men's basketball

Atlantic 10 regular season and tournament champions

NCAA tournament, First Round
- Conference: Atlantic 10 Conference
- Record: 27–8 (15–3 A-10)
- Head coach: Mike Rhoades (6th season)
- Associate head coach: Jamal Brunt
- Assistant coaches: J. D. Byers; Brent Scott
- Home arena: Stuart C. Siegel Center

2022–23 Atlantic 10 men's basketball standings
	Conf.				Overall
Team	W		L	PCT	W		L	PCT
VCU †	15	–	3	.833	27	–	8	.771
Fordham	12	–	6	.667	25	–	8	.758
Dayton	12	–	6	.667	22	–	12	.647
Saint Louis	12	–	6	.667	21	–	12	.636
George Mason	11	–	7	.611	20	–	13	.606
Duquesne	10	–	8	.556	20	–	13	.606
George Washington	10	–	8	.556	16	–	16	.500
Davidson	8	–	10	.444	16	–	16	.500
Saint Joseph's	8	–	10	.444	16	–	17	.485
St. Bonaventure	8	–	10	.444	14	–	18	.438
Richmond	7	–	11	.389	15	–	18	.455
La Salle	7	–	11	.389	15	–	19	.441
Massachusetts	6	–	12	.333	15	–	16	.484
Rhode Island	5	–	13	.278	9	–	22	.290
Loyola Chicago	4	–	14	.222	10	–	21	.323
† 2023 A10 tournament winner

The 2022–23 VCU Rams men's basketball team represented Virginia Commonwealth University during the 2022–23 NCAA Division I men's basketball season. They were led by sixth-year head coach is Mike Rhoades and played their home games at the Siegel Center in Richmond, Virginia as a member of the Atlantic 10 Conference. They finished the season 27–8, 15–3 in A-10 play to win the regular season championship. They defeated Davidson, Saint Louis, and Dayton to win the A-10 tournament championship, their first since 2015. As a result, they received the conference's automatic bid to the NCAA tournament as the No. 12 seed in the West region. There they lost to Saint Mary's in the first round.

On March 29, 2023, head coach Mike Rhoades left the school to take the head coaching position at Penn State. That same day, the school named Utah State head coach Ryan Odom the team's new coach.

== Previous season ==
The Rams finished the 2021–22 season 22–10, 14–4 in A-10 play to finish in a tie for second place. As the No. 3 seed in the A-10 tournament, they lost in the quarterfinals to Richmond. The Rams received an at-large bid to the National Invitation Tournament, their first since 2008, where they defeated Princeton before losing to Wake Forest in the second round.

== Offseason ==
=== Departures ===
Name	Number	Pos.	Height	Weight	Year	Hometown	Notes
Vince Williams Jr.	10	F	6'6"	205	Senior	Toledo, Ohio	Declared for NBA draft; selected 47th overall by the Memphis Grizzlies
KeShawn Curry	11	G	6'4"	180	Senior	Jacksonville, Florida	Graduated
Marcus Tsohonis	5	G	6'3"	190	Junior	Portland, Oregon	Transferred to Long Beach State
Jimmy Nichols Jr.	55	F	6'8"	225	RS Junior	Conway, South Carolina	Transferred to Coastal Carolina
Hason Ward	20	F	6'9"	215	Junior	Saint Thomas, Barbados	Transferred to Iowa State
Levi Stockard III	34	F	6'8"	240	Graduate Student	St. Louis, Missouri	Graduated
Mikeal Brown-Jones	2	F	6'8"	220	Sophomore	Philadelphia, Pennsylvania	Transferred to UNC Greensboro

=== Incoming transfers ===
Name	Number	Pos.	Height	Weight	Year	Hometown	Previous school
Zeb Jackson	5	G	6'5"	180	Junior	Toledo, Ohio	Transferred from Michigan
Brandon Johns Jr.	30	F	6'8"	240	Graduate Student	Lansing, Michigan	Transferred from Michigan
David Shriver	35	G/F	6'6"	220	Senior	Philippi, West Virginia	Transferred from Hartford

=== 2022 recruiting class ===
College recruiting information
Name	Hometown	School	Height	Weight	Commit date
Alphonzo Billups III; G/F	Richmond, VA	Varina High School	6 ft 7 in (2.01 m)	180 lb (82 kg)	Nov 11, 2020
Alphonzo Billups III; G/F	Recruit ratings: Scout: Rivals: 247Sports: (82)				
Christian Fermin; F	Tobyhanna, Pennsylvania	Pocono Mountain West High School	6 ft 10 in (2.08 m)	215 lb (98 kg)	Nov 11, 2020
Christian Fermin; F	Recruit ratings: Scout: Rivals: 247Sports: (82)				
Toibu Lawal; F	London, England	Lee Academy (Maine)	6 ft 8 in (2.03 m)	200 lb (91 kg)	Apr 18, 2021
Toibu Lawal; F	Recruit ratings: Scout: Rivals: 247Sports:				
Obinnaya Okafor; F	Hampton, Virginia	Bethel High School (Virginia)	6 ft 9 in (2.06 m)	216 lb (98 kg)	Apr 18, 2021
Obinnaya Okafor; F	Recruit ratings: Scout: Rivals: 247Sports:				
Overall recruit ranking:
Note: In many cases, Scout, Rivals, 247Sports, On3, and ESPN may conflict in their listings of height and weight.; In these cases, the average was taken. ESPN grades are on a 100-point scale.; Sources: "VCU 2022 Player Commits". ESPN.; "2022 Team Ranking". Rivals.

== Roster ==
2022–23 VCU Rams men's basketball team
Players
Coaches

Pos.	#	Name	Height	Weight	Year	Previous school	Hometown
F	0	Jamir Watkins	6 ft 7 in (2.01 m)	210 lb (95 kg)	RS So	Trenton Catholic	Trenton, New Jersey
G	1	Ace Baldwin Jr.	6 ft 1 in (1.85 m)	190 lb (86 kg)	Jr	St. Frances Academy	Baltimore, Maryland
G	2	Zeb Jackson	6 ft 5 in (1.96 m)	180 lb (82 kg)	Jr	Michigan	Toledo, Ohio
F	4	Jalen DeLoach	6 ft 9 in (2.06 m)	215 lb (98 kg)	So	The Skill Factory	Savannah, Georgia
G/F	5	Alphonzo "Fats" Billups III	6 ft 7 in (2.01 m)	180 lb (82 kg)	Fr	Varina	Richmond, VA
F	10	Tobi Lawal	6 ft 8 in (2.03 m)	200 lb (91 kg)	Fr	Lee Academy	London, England
F	11	Christian Fermin	6 ft 10 in (2.08 m)	215 lb (98 kg)	Fr	Pocono Mountain West	Tobyhanna, Pennsylvania
G	15	Arnold Henderson VI	5 ft 10 in (1.78 m)	180 lb (82 kg)	Sr	St. Christopher's School	Mechanicsville, Virginia
G	21	Jarren McAllister (injured)	6 ft 4 in (1.93 m)	205 lb (93 kg)	RS Jr	Massanutten Military Academy	Wake Forest, North Carolina
G	23	Jayden Nunn	6 ft 4 in (1.93 m)	190 lb (86 kg)	So	Dream City Christian	Flint, Michigan
F	24	Nick Kern Jr.	6 ft 6 in (1.98 m)	190 lb (86 kg)	So	Vashon HS	St. Louis, Missouri
F	30	Brandon Johns Jr.	6 ft 8 in (2.03 m)	240 lb (109 kg)	GS	Michigan	Lansing, Michigan
G	33	Josh Banks	6 ft 5 in (1.96 m)	175 lb (79 kg)	Jr	Olympic	Charlotte, North Carolina
F	34	Obinnaya Okafor	6 ft 9 in (2.06 m)	216 lb (98 kg)	Fr	Bethel	Hampton, Virginia
G/F	35	David Shriver	6 ft 6 in (1.98 m)	220 lb (100 kg)	RS Sr	Hartford	Philippi, West Virginia

Head coach

- Mike Rhoades (Lebanon Valley)

Assistant coach(es)

- J. D. Byers (Lebanon Valley)
- Brent Scott (Rice)
- Jamal Brunt (Randolph–Macon)

Legend

- (C) Team captain
- (S) Suspended
- (I) Ineligible
- (W) Walk-on
- Injured
- Current redshirt

Roster

== Schedule and results ==
The Rams placed third in the Legends Classic.

Date time, TV	Rank^{#}	Opponent^{#}	Result	Record	High points	High rebounds	High assists	Site (attendance) city, state
Exhibition
October 29, 2022*; 7:00 p.m.		Shippensburg	W 88–53		15 – DeLoach	5 – DeLoach	7 – Baldwin Jr.	Siegel Center (5,108); Richmond, VA
Non-conference regular season
November 7, 2022*; 7:00 p.m., ESPN+		Manhattan	W 73–56	1–0	15 – Baldwin Jr.	9 – DeLoach	9 – Baldwin Jr.	Siegel Center (7,344); Richmond, VA
November 12, 2022*; 7:00 p.m., MASN/ESPN+		Morgan State	W 69–54	2–0	15 – Johns Jr.	9 – Watkins	5 – Baldwin Jr.	Siegel Center (7,125); Richmond, VA
November 16, 2022*; 8:30 p.m., ESPN+		vs. Arizona State; Legends Classic semifinal	L 59–63	2–1	13 – Nunn	8 – DeLoach	5 – Nunn	Barclays Center (5,778); Brooklyn, NY
November 17, 2022*; 7:00 p.m., ESPN2		vs. Pittsburgh; Legends Classic third place game	W 71–67	3–1	18 – Johns Jr.	9 – Johns Jr.	3 – Jackson	Barclays Center; Brooklyn, NY
November 20, 2022*; 5:00 p.m., ESPN+		at Memphis	L 47–62	3–2	14 – Watkins	10 – Watkins	3 – Watkins	FedExForum (10,653); Memphis, TN
November 26, 2022*; 4:00 p.m., MASN/ESPN+		Kennesaw State	W 64–61	4–2	24 – Nunn	7 – Johns Jr.	4 – Jackson	Siegel Center (6,807); Richmond, VA
November 30, 2022*; 7:00 p.m., CBSSN		Vanderbilt	W 70–65	5–2	28 – Baldwin Jr.	6 – DeLoach	4 – Baldwin Jr.	Siegel Center (7,117); Richmond, VA
December 3, 2022*; 1:00 p.m., ESPNU		at Temple	L 73–83	5–3	16 – Tied	6 – DeLoach	9 – Baldwin Jr.	Liacouras Center (4,094); Philadelphia, PA
December 7, 2022*; 7:00 p.m., MASN/ESPN+		Jacksonville	L 62–73	5–4	20 – Johns Jr.	6 – Nunn	4 – Baldwin Jr.	Siegel Center (7,015); Richmond, VA
December 11, 2022*; 7:00 p.m., MASN/ESPN+		Howard	W 70–60	6–4	16 – Johns Jr.	7 – Johns Jr.	2 – Tied	Siegel Center (7,220); Richmond, VA
December 14, 2022*; 7:00 p.m., MASN/ESPN+		Radford	W 70–62	7–4	18 – Johns Jr.	11 – Watkins	6 – Baldwin Jr.	Siegel Center (7,314); Richmond, VA
December 17, 2022*; 4:00 p.m., MASN/ESPN+		Northern Illinois	W 90–63	8–4	22 – Watkins	9 – DeLoach	8 – Baldwin Jr.	Siegel Center (6,817); Richmond, VA
December 21, 2022*; 7:00 p.m., MASN/ESPN+		Navy	W 74–52	9–4	18 – Tied	6 – Tied	8 – Baldwin Jr.	Siegel Center (7,214); Richmond, VA
Atlantic 10 regular season
December 31, 2022; 2:00 p.m., MASN/ESPN+		La Salle	W 80–67	10–4 (1–0)	19 – Baldwin Jr.	13 – DeLoach	6 – Baldwin Jr.	Siegel Center (7,323); Richmond, VA
January 4, 2023; 7:00 p.m., ESPN+		at Duquesne	L 70–79	10–5 (1–1)	22 – Johns Jr.	6 – Johns Jr.	2 – Baldwin Jr.	UPMC Cooper Fieldhouse (2,087); Pittsburgh, PA
January 7, 2023; 12:00 p.m., USA		Davidson	W 89–72	11–5 (2–1)	19 – Baldwin Jr.	4 – Johns Jr.	8 – Baldwin Jr.	Siegel Center (7,107); Richmond, VA
January 10, 2023; 7:00 p.m., CBSSN		at Loyola Chicago	W 78–64	12–5 (3–1)	16 – DeLoach	7 – DeLoach	8 – Baldwin Jr.	Joseph J. Gentile Arena (2,249); Chicago, IL
January 13, 2023; 9:00 p.m., ESPN2		at Dayton	W 63–62	13–5 (4–1)	18 – Shriver	8 – DeLoach	4 – Baldwin Jr.	UD Arena (13,407); Dayton, OH
January 17, 2023; 7:00 p.m., NBC Digital		UMass	W 83–55	14–5 (5–1)	19 – DeLoach	12 – DeLoach	5 – Jackson	Siegel Center (7,225); Richmond, VA
January 20, 2023; 7:00 p.m., ESPN2		at Richmond; Capital City Classic	W 74–62	15–5 (6–1)	15 – Watkins	10 – Watkins	5 – Baldwin Jr.	Robins Center (7,201); Richmond, VA
January 25, 2023; 7:00 p.m., MASN/ESPN+		George Mason; Rivalry	W 72–52	16–5 (7–1)	13 – Shriver	9 – Baldwin Jr.	7 – Baldwin Jr.	Siegel Center (7,637); Richmond, VA
January 28, 2023; 6:00 p.m., CBSSN		St. Bonaventure	L 58–61	16–6 (7–2)	15 – Baldwin Jr.	12 – DeLoach	6 – Baldwin Jr.	Siegel Center (7,637); Richmond, VA
January 31, 2023; 7:00 p.m., CBSSN		at Davidson	W 61–59	17–6 (8–2)	14 – Baldwin Jr.	9 – DeLoach	7 – Baldwin Jr.	John M. Belk Arena (3,179); Davidson, NC
February 3, 2023; 7:00 p.m., ESPN2		at Saint Louis	W 73–65	18–6 (9–2)	37 – Baldwin Jr.	11 – DeLoach	3 – DeLoach	Chaifetz Arena (9,230); St. Louis, MO
February 7, 2023; 7:00 p.m., CBSSN		Dayton	L 58–62	18–7 (9–3)	14 – Baldwin Jr.	9 – DeLoach	3 – Baldwin Jr.	Siegel Center (7,637); Richmond, VA
February 15, 2023; 7:00 p.m., MASN/ESPN+		at Rhode Island	W 55–54	19–7 (10–3)	17 – Johns Jr.	5 – Johns Jr.	4 – Baldwin Jr.	Ryan Center (4,229); Kingston, RI
February 18, 2023; 2:30 p.m., USA		Fordham	W 80–61	20–7 (11–3)	17 – Kern Jr.	8 – DeLoach	10 – Baldwin Jr.	Siegel Center (7,637); Richmond, VA
February 21, 2023; 7:00 p.m., ESPN+		at Saint Joseph's	W 88–63	21–7 (12–3)	31 – Nunn	7 – Tied	3 – Nunn	Hagan Arena (1,398); Philadelphia, PA
February 24, 2023; 7:00 p.m., ESPN2		Richmond; Capital City Classic	W 73–58	22–7 (13–3)	18 – Baldwin Jr.	9 – Watkins	8 – Baldwin Jr.	Siegel Center (7,637); Richmond, VA
February 28, 2023; 7:00 p.m., CBSSN		Saint Louis	W 79–67	23–7 (14–3)	14 – DeLoach	7 – Tied	6 – Baldwin Jr.	Siegel Center (7,637); Richmond, VA
March 4, 2023; 4:30 p.m., USA		at George Washington	W 74–68	24–7 (15–3)	17 – Johns Jr.	10 – Johns Jr.	7 – Baldwin Jr.	Charles E. Smith Center (3,712); Washington, D.C.
A-10 tournament
March 9, 2023; 11:30 a.m., USA	(1)	vs. (8) Davidson; Quarterfinals	W 71–53	25–7	11 – Tied	9 – Kern	6 – Baldwin Jr.	Barclays Center (5,680); Brooklyn, NY
March 11, 2023; 1:00 p.m., CBSSN	(1)	vs. (4) Saint Louis; Semifinals	W 90–78	26–7	18 – Nunn	9 – Johns Jr.	6 – Baldwin Jr.	Barclays Center (10,156); Brooklyn, NY
March 12, 2023; 1:00 p.m., CBS/Paramount+	(1)	vs. (2) Dayton; Championship	W 68–56	27–7	16 – Baldwin	10 – DeLoach	7 – Baldwin	Barclays Center (8,162); Brooklyn, NY
NCAA tournament
March 17, 2023*; 2:00 pm, TBS	(12 W)	vs. (5 W) No. 19 Saint Mary's; First Round	L 51–63	27–8	13 – Baldwin Jr.	7 – Nunn	3 – Baldwin Jr.	MVP Arena; Albany, NY
*Non-conference game. ^{#}Rankings from AP Poll. (#) Tournament seedings in parentheses. All times are in Eastern Time.

== See also ==
- 2022–23 VCU Rams women's basketball team
