= Jeff Tarpinian =

Armenian-American football player (born 1987)

No. 53, 52
- Position: Linebacker

Personal information
- Born: October 16, 1987 (age 39); Omaha, Nebraska, U.S.
- Listed height: 6 ft 3 in (1.91 m)
- Listed weight: 240 lb (109 kg)

Career information
- High school: Millard North (Omaha)
- College: Iowa
- NFL draft: 2011: undrafted

Career history
- New England Patriots (2011–2012); Carolina Panthers (2013)*; Houston Texans (2013–2014)
- * Offseason or practice squad member only

Career NFL statistics
- Total tackles: 45
- Sacks: 0.5
- Forced fumbles: 1
- Stats at Pro Football Reference

Jeff Tarpinian (born October 16, 1987) is an Armenian-American former professional football linebacker. He was signed by the New England Patriots as an undrafted free agent in 2011. He played college football at Iowa.

== Early life ==
He was named 2005 Nebraska Gatorade Player of the Year. He was selected to the first-team all-state and all-conference in his senior season. He was an honorable mention all-state in both his sophomore and junior season along with the second-team all-conference as a junior season.

== College career ==
He was named to the Academic All-Big Ten in both his freshman and sophomore seasons.

== Professional career ==
=== New England Patriots ===
Tarpinian went undrafted in the 2011 NFL draft and signed with the New England Patriots as a rookie free agent in July, soon after the end of the 2011 NFL lockout.

After being elevated to the active roster on September 22, he made the first defensive start of his NFL career on Sunday Night Football in Week 10 against the division rival New York Jets. He recorded 3 solo tackles and an assist in the team's 37–16 victory.

On November 24, 2011, the Patriots placed Tarpinian on injured reserve, with the listed reason as a "head injury". It would be revealed years later that injury was in fact a cerebral cavernous malformation that required brain surgery. Tarpinian was able to make a full recovery and return to the Patriots for the 2012 season, playing mainly on special teams.

=== Houston Texans ===
After spending time on the Carolina Panthers' practice squad, the Houston Texans signed Tarpinian to their active roster in October 2013. He would go on to play in eight games that season, making three starts.

Tarpinian would return to the Texans in 2014, reuniting him with former Patriots Offensive Coordinator Bill O'Brien, who was hired that offseason as head coach. His role on the team that season was mainly on special teams.

Tarpinian was released by the Texans on September 1, 2015 before their final preseason game, and became an unrestricted free agent.
