= Keith Lutz Horizon High School =

Public alternative high school in Omaha, Nebraska

Location
- 5300 George B. Lake Parkway; Omaha, Nebraska, 68022; United States; 41°12′14″N 96°14′44″W

Information
- Former name: Millard Horizon High School
- Type: Public, alternative
- Established: January 4, 2010
- School district: Millard Public Schools
- NCES School ID: 317374002375
- Principal: Emili Brosnan
- Staff: 9
- Faculty: 18
- Grades: 9-12
- Website: Official website

Keith Lutz Horizon High School is a public high school located in Omaha, Nebraska, United States. The school first opened its doors on January 11, 2010 (due to snow days). It is Millard Alternative High School and houses a few Millard Academies.

In 2005, Millard voters approved the fourth-largest bond project in district history, providing $78 million for the construction of Millard South; renovations to all three high schools, one middle school and one elementary school; and the purchase of new land and technology. Horizon was in this plan to become the alternative high school in 2010.
