= 2022–23 Atlantic 10 Conference men's basketball season =

- League: NCAA Division I
- Sport: Basketball
- Teams: 15

Regular Season

Atlantic 10 Conference Tournament

Seasons
- ← 2021–22 2023–24 →

2022–23 Atlantic 10 men's basketball standings
	Conf.				Overall
Team	W		L	PCT	W		L	PCT
VCU †	15	–	3	.833	27	–	8	.771
Fordham	12	–	6	.667	25	–	8	.758
Dayton	12	–	6	.667	22	–	12	.647
Saint Louis	12	–	6	.667	21	–	12	.636
George Mason	11	–	7	.611	20	–	13	.606
Duquesne	10	–	8	.556	20	–	13	.606
George Washington	10	–	8	.556	16	–	16	.500
Davidson	8	–	10	.444	16	–	16	.500
Saint Joseph's	8	–	10	.444	16	–	17	.485
St. Bonaventure	8	–	10	.444	14	–	18	.438
Richmond	7	–	11	.389	15	–	18	.455
La Salle	7	–	11	.389	15	–	19	.441
Massachusetts	6	–	12	.333	15	–	16	.484
Rhode Island	5	–	13	.278	9	–	22	.290
Loyola Chicago	4	–	14	.222	10	–	21	.323
† 2023 A10 tournament winner

The 2022–23 Atlantic 10 Conference men's basketball season started non-conference play on November 7, 2022, and began conference play on December 28, 2022. The regular season was scheduled to end on March 4, 2022, followed by the 2023 Atlantic 10 men's basketball tournament from March 7 to March 12.

== Conference Schedule ==
Each team was scheduled to play 18 conference games. This resulted in each team playing 10 teams a singular time and 4 teams twice, once at home and once on the road.

== Head coaches ==
=== Coaches ===
Team	Head Coach	Years At School	Record at School	Atlantic 10 Record
Davidson	Matt McKillop	1	5-1	0-0
Dayton	Anthony Grant	5	105-53	62-26
Duquesne	Keith Dambrot	6	74-72	37-49
Fordham	Keith Urgo	1	3-1	0-0
George Mason	Kim English	1	16-19	7-9
George Washington	Chris Caputo	1	3-1	0-0
La Salle	Fran Dunphy	1	2-3	80-32
Loyola Chicago	Drew Valentine	2	27-11	0-0
UMass	Frank Martin	1	4-1	0-0
Rhode Island	Archie Miller	1	1-2	68-34
Richmond	Chris Mooney	17	313-246	153-127
St. Bonaventure	Mark Schmidt	15	270-196	141-110
Saint Joseph's	Billy Lange	3	24-60	10-37
Saint Louis	Travis Ford	6	116-78	87-63
VCU	Mike Rhoades	5	105-54	57-29

Notes:

- Year at school includes 2022–23 season.
- Overall and Atlantic 10 records are from the time at current school and through the 2022–23 season.

Source: Atlantic 10

== Preseason Awards ==
=== Preseason men's basketball poll ===
First Place Votes in Parentheses

1. Dayton (22) - 428
2. Saint Louis (7) - 411
3. VCU - 370
4. Loyola Chicago - 315
5. George Mason - 300
6. Davidson - 294
7. Richmond - 276
8. UMass - 228
9. Rhode Island - 203
10. St. Bonaventure - 194
11. Fordham - 119
12. George Washington - 110
13. Saint Joseph's - 107
14. La Salle - 63
15. Duquesne - 62

Source: Atlantic 10

=== Preseason Honors ===
Honor	Recipient
Preseason All-Atlantic 10 First Team	Foster Loyer, Davidson
Preseason All-Atlantic 10 First Team	DaRon Holmes II, Dayton
Preseason All-Atlantic 10 First Team	Josh Oduro, George Mason
Preseason All-Atlantic 10 First Team	Tyler Burton, Richmond
Preseason All-Atlantic 10 First Team	Yuri Collins, Saint Louis
Preseason All-Atlantic 10 First Team	Ace Baldwin Jr., VCU
Preseason All-Atlantic 10 Second Team	Toumani Camara, Dayton
Preseason All-Atlantic 10 Second Team	Malachi Smith, Dayton
Preseason All-Atlantic 10 Second Team	James Bishop IV, George Washington
Preseason All-Atlantic 10 Second Team	Noah Fernandes, UMass
Preseason All-Atlantic 10 Second Team	Gibson Jimerson, Saint Louis
Preseason All-Atlantic 10 Second Team	Javonte Perkins, Saint Louis
Preseason All-Atlantic 10 Third Team	Darius Quisenberry, Fordham
Preseason All-Atlantic 10 Third Team	Braden Norris, Loyola Chicago
Preseason All-Atlantic 10 Third Team	Brayon Freeman, Rhode Island
Preseason All-Atlantic 10 Third Team	Erik Reynolds II, Saint Joseph's
Preseason All-Atlantic 10 Third Team	Francis Okoro, Saint Louis
Preseason All-Atlantic 10 Third Team	Jayden Nunn, VCU

== Regular season ==
=== Rankings ===
Team	Preseason	Wk 2	Wk 3	Wk 4	Wk 5	Wk 6	Wk 7	Wk 8	Wk 9	Wk 10	Wk 11	Wk 12	Wk 13	Wk 14	Wk 15	Wk 16	Final
Davidson	–	–	–	–	–	–	–	–									
Dayton	24	21	RV	–	–	–	–	–									
Duquesne	–	–	–	–	–	–	–	–									
Fordham	–	–	–	–	–	–	–	–									
George Mason	–	–	–	–	–	–	–	–									
George Washington	–	–	–	–	–	–	–	–									
La Salle	–	–	–	–	–	–	–	–									
Loyola Chicago	–																
UMass	–	–	–	–	–	–	–	–									
Rhode Island	–	–	–	–	–	–	–	–									
Richmond	–	–	–	–	–	–	–	–									
St. Bonaventure	–	–	–	–	–	–	–	–									
Saint Joseph's	–	–	–	–	–	–	–	–									
Saint Louis	RV	RV	RV	–	–	–	–	–									
VCU	–	–	–	–	–	–	–	–	–	RV	RV	–	RV	–	–	RV	

Notes:

- Rankings are from the AP poll

=== Conference standings ===
2022–23 Atlantic 10 men's basketball standings
	Conf.				Overall
Team	W		L	PCT	W		L	PCT
VCU †	15	–	3	.833	27	–	8	.771
Fordham	12	–	6	.667	25	–	8	.758
Dayton	12	–	6	.667	22	–	12	.647
Saint Louis	12	–	6	.667	21	–	12	.636
George Mason	11	–	7	.611	20	–	13	.606
Duquesne	10	–	8	.556	20	–	13	.606
George Washington	10	–	8	.556	16	–	16	.500
Davidson	8	–	10	.444	16	–	16	.500
Saint Joseph's	8	–	10	.444	16	–	17	.485
St. Bonaventure	8	–	10	.444	14	–	18	.438
Richmond	7	–	11	.389	15	–	18	.455
La Salle	7	–	11	.389	15	–	19	.441
Massachusetts	6	–	12	.333	15	–	16	.484
Rhode Island	5	–	13	.278	9	–	22	.290
Loyola Chicago	4	–	14	.222	10	–	21	.323
† 2023 A10 tournament winner

== Postseason ==
=== 2023 Atlantic 10 Tournament ===
The Atlantic 10 Men's Basketball tournament was held in Brooklyn at Barclays Center from March 7 to March 12.

First round Tuesday, March 7 ESPN+
12	Richmond	71
13	Massachusetts	38
10	Saint Joseph's	72
15	Loyola Chicago	67
11	La Salle	73
14	Rhode Island	56

Second round Wednesday, March 8 USA Network/Peacock
8	Davidson	65
9	St. Bonaventure	54
5	George Mason	62
12	Richmond	57
7	George Washington	76
10	Saint Joseph's	87
6	Duquesne	70
11	La Salle	81

Quarterfinals; Thursday, March 9 USA Network/Peacock
1	VCU	71
8	Davidson	53
4	Saint Louis	82
5	George Mason	54
2	Dayton	60
10	Saint Joseph's	54
3	Fordham	69
11	La Salle	61

Semifinals; Saturday, March 11; CBSSN
1	VCU	90
4	Saint Louis	78
2	Dayton	78
3	Fordham	68

Championship; Sunday, March 12; CBS/Paramount+
1	VCU	68
2	Dayton	56

=== NCAA Tournament ===
Seed	Region	School	First round	Second round	Sweet 16	Elite Eight	Final Four	Championship
12	West	VCU	Lost to (5) Saint Mary's 63–51	DNP				
