= 2022–23 George Mason Patriots men's basketball team =

American college basketball season

2022–23 George Mason Patriots men's basketball
- Conference: Atlantic 10 Conference
- Record: 20–13 (11–7 A–10)
- Head coach: Kim English (2nd season)
- Assistant coaches: Dennis Felton; Duane Simpkins; Nate Tomlinson
- Home arena: EagleBank Arena

2022–23 Atlantic 10 men's basketball standings
	Conf.				Overall
Team	W		L	PCT	W		L	PCT
VCU †	15	–	3	.833	27	–	8	.771
Fordham	12	–	6	.667	25	–	8	.758
Dayton	12	–	6	.667	22	–	12	.647
Saint Louis	12	–	6	.667	21	–	12	.636
George Mason	11	–	7	.611	20	–	13	.606
Duquesne	10	–	8	.556	20	–	13	.606
George Washington	10	–	8	.556	16	–	16	.500
Davidson	8	–	10	.444	16	–	16	.500
Saint Joseph's	8	–	10	.444	16	–	17	.485
St. Bonaventure	8	–	10	.444	14	–	18	.438
Richmond	7	–	11	.389	15	–	18	.455
La Salle	7	–	11	.389	15	–	19	.441
Massachusetts	6	–	12	.333	15	–	16	.484
Rhode Island	5	–	13	.278	9	–	22	.290
Loyola Chicago	4	–	14	.222	10	–	21	.323
† 2023 A10 tournament winner

The 2022–23 George Mason Patriots Men's basketball team represented George Mason University during the 2022–23 NCAA Division I men's basketball season. The season was the 57th for the program, the second under head coach Kim English, and the tenth as members of the Atlantic 10 Conference (A-10). The Patriots played their home games at EagleBank Arena in Fairfax, Virginia. They finished the season 20–13, 11–7 in A-10 play, to finish in fifth place. This was the first season since 2017 that the Patriots finished the season with at least 20 wins. They defeated Richmond in the second round of the A-10 tournament before losing to Saint Louis.

On March 23, 2023, head coach Kim English left the school to take the head coaching job at Providence. On March 30, the school named Maryland assistant coach Tony Skinn the team's new head coach.

== Previous season ==
In Kim English's first season as head coach, the Patriots finished the 2021–22 season 14–16, 7–9 in A-10 play, to finish in ninth place. Their season ended with a loss to Fordham in the second round of the A-10 tournament.

== Offseason ==
=== Departures ===
Name	Number	Pos.	Height	Weight	Year	Hometown	Notes
Blake Buchanan	22	G	6'5"	205	Grad Senior	Durham, NC	Graduated
Otis Frazier	5	F	6'6"	212	Junior	Buckeye, AZ	Transferred to UTEP
Jamal Hartwell II	10	G	5'10"	155	Grad Senior	Inglewood, CA	Transferred to UC Riverside
TJ Gadsden	32	G/F	6'7"	192	Freshman	New York, NY	Transferred to Canisius
Mike Gray	11	G	6'1"	160	Sophomore	Fredericksburg, VA	
Xavier Johnson	2	G	6'1"	186	Senior	Germantown, MD	Transferred to Southern Illinois
Joel Kabimba	33	F	6'8"	210	Freshman	Kinshasa, Congo	Transferred to Bryant
Sam Shelton	4	G	6'1"	210	Freshman	Sterling, VA	
D'Shawn Schwartz	15	G/F	6'7"	232	Grad Senior	Colorado Springs, CO	Graduated

=== Arrivals ===
Name	Number	Pos.	Height	Weight	Year	Hometown	Notes
Victor Bailey Jr.		G	6'4"	182	RS Junior	Austin, TX	Transferred from Tennessee
Devin Dinkins		G	5'10"	155	Freshman	Washington, D.C.	
Justyn Fernandez		G/F	6'5"	200	Freshman	Richmond, VA	
Peter Oduro		F	6'9"	224	Freshman	Gainesville, VA	
Andrei O'Grady- Cook		G	5'10"	155	RS Freshman	Alexandria, VA	Transferred from Saint Vincent
Saquan Singleton		G	6'6"	190	RS Junior	The Bronx, NY	Transferred from New Mexico

== Honors and awards ==
All Atlantic 10 First Team

- Josh Oduro

Atlantic 10 Player of the Week

- Josh Oduro – January 16
- Josh Oduro – February 20

== Roster ==
2022–23 George Mason Patriots men's basketball team
Players
Coaches

Pos.	#	Name	Height	Weight	Year	Previous school	Hometown
G	0	Devon Cooper	6 ft 4 in (1.93 m)	201 lb (91 kg)	GS	Morehead State	Louisville, KY
G	1	Ronald Polite III	6 ft 2 in (1.88 m)	182 lb (83 kg)	Jr	Oxon Hill High School	Temple Hills, MD
G	2	Victor Bailey Jr.	6 ft 4 in (1.93 m)	182 lb (83 kg)	GS	Tennessee	Austin, TX
G	3	Davonte Gaines	6 ft 7 in (2.01 m)	175 lb (79 kg)	Sr	Tennessee	Buffalo, NY
G	4	Justyn Fernandez	6 ft 5 in (1.96 m)	200 lb (91 kg)	Fr	IMG Academy	Richmond, VA
G	5	Devin Dinkins	5 ft 10 in (1.78 m)	164 lb (74 kg)	Fr	Gonzaga	Washington, D.C.
G	7	Andrei O.'Grady-Cook (redshirt)	5 ft 10 in (1.78 m)	155 lb (70 kg)	RS Fr	Commonwealth Academy	Alexandria, VA
F	12	Peter Oduro	6 ft 7 in (2.01 m)	224 lb (102 kg)	Fr	Virginia Academy High School	Gainesville, VA
F	13	Josh Oduro	6 ft 9 in (2.06 m)	235 lb (107 kg)	Sr	Paul VI High School	Gainesville, VA
G	15	Saquan Singleton	6 ft 6 in (1.98 m)	190 lb (86 kg)	GS	New Mexico	The Bronx, NY
F	20	Ginika Ojiako	6 ft 10 in (2.08 m)	240 lb (109 kg)	GS	Virginia Tech	Lagos, Nigeria
F	23	Elvis Nnaji	6 ft 7 in (2.01 m)	222 lb (101 kg)	Fr	Hopkins High School	Hopkins, MN
F	24	Blake Jones	6 ft 10 in (2.08 m)	222 lb (101 kg)	So	NBA Global Academy	Canberra, Australia
G	30	Chase Tucker (W)	6 ft 1 in (1.85 m)	165 lb (75 kg)	So	Mount Pisgah Christian	Alpharetta, GA
F	35	Malik Henry	6 ft 8 in (2.03 m)	230 lb (104 kg)	Jr	Longview High School	Longview, TX

Head coach

- Kim English (Missouri)

Assistant coach(es)

- Dennis Felton (Howard)
- Duane Simpkins (Maryland)
- Nate Tomlinson (Colorado)

Legend

- (C) Team captain
- (S) Suspended
- (I) Ineligible
- (W) Walk-on
- Injured
- Current redshirt

Roster
Last update: October 14, 2022

== Player statistics ==
Player	GP	GS	MPG	FG%	3FG%	FT%	RPG	APG	SPG	BPG	PPG
Josh Oduro	33	33	29.1	.551	.233	.616	7.9	2.6	0.8	0.9	15.6
Victor Bailey Jr.	24	20	31.7	.449	.470	.804	3.2	1.6	0.4	0.2	11.8
Ronald Polite III	30	28	31.8	.441	.364	.790	3.2	4.0	1.0	0.3	11.5
DeVon Cooper	33	33	33.3	.362	.333	.782	4.0	2.7	0.8	0.1	10.2
Davonte Gaines	23	23	27.0	.382	.343	.744	6.1	1.2	0.6	0.3	7.3
Ginika Ojiako	33	5	10.5	.580	.000	.639	2.5	0.1	0.1	0.4	4.2
Justyn Fernandez	33	13	14.1	.370	.338	.563	1.9	0.5	0.3	0.1	4.1
Malik Henry	32	4	11.4	.621	.000	.434	2.7	0.1	0.3	0.4	4.1
Saquan Singleton	32	2	16.0	.457	.000	.370	2.8	1.1	0.6	0.4	3.3
Devin Dinkins	31	4	11.4	.350	.333	.742	0.6	0.8	0.3	0.0	3.1
Kam Johnson	3	0	3.7	.200	.000	.000	1.0	0.3	0.0	0.0	0.7
Elvis Nnaji	13	0	4.0	.273	.000	.000	0.9	0.1	0.0	0.2	0.5
Blake Jones	23	0	6.0	.176	.231	.000	1.0	0.3	0.0	0.1	0.4
Peter Oduro	7	0	1.6	.000	.000	.000	0.3	0.0	0.0	0.1	0.0
Chase Tucker	2	0	1.5	.000	.000	.000	0.0	0.0	0.0	0.0	0.0
Andrei O'Grady-Cook	0	0	0.0	.000	.000	.000	0.0	0.0	0.0	0.0	0.0

== Schedule and results ==
Date time, TV	Rank^{#}	Opponent^{#}	Result	Record	High points	High rebounds	High assists	Site (attendance) city, state
Non-conference regular season
November 7, 2022*; 8:00 p.m., SECN+/ESPN+		at No. 15 Auburn	L 52–70	0–1	10 – Polite III	5 – Bailey Jr.	4 – Polite III	Neville Arena (9,121); Auburn, AL
November 11, 2022*; 7:00 p.m., ESPN+		Longwood	W 83–69	1–1	20 – Oduro	12 – Oduro	4 – Singleton	EagleBank Arena (5,185); Fairfax, VA
November 13, 2022*; 4:00 p.m., ESPN+		American	W 73–56	2–1	23 – Bailey Jr.	9 – Gaines	6 – Oduro	EagleBank Arena (3,113); Fairfax, VA
November 18, 2022*; 8:00 p.m., ESPN3		vs. Boston College; Paradise Jam Tournament opening round	L 56–71	2–2	15 – Bailey Jr.	7 – Bailey Jr.	3 – Gaines	Sports and Fitness Center (924); Saint Thomas, USVI
November 19, 2022*; 5:45 p.m., ESPN3		vs. Belmont; Paradise Jam Tournament consolation second round	L 62–66	2–3	15 – Cooper	7 – tied	4 – Oduro	Sports and Fitness Center (724); Saint Thomas, USVI
November 21, 2022*; 1:00 p.m., ESPN3		vs. Buffalo; Paradise Jam Tournament 7th-place game	L 74–82	2–4	17 – Oduro	6 – tied	6 – Cooper	Sports and Fitness Center; Saint Thomas, USVI
November 26, 2022*; 2:00 p.m., ESPN+		Queens	W 72–65	3–4	16 – Polite III	8 – Oduro	3 – Oduro	EagleBank Arena (2,460); Fairfax, VA
November 30, 2022*; 7:00 p.m., MASN2		Hofstra	W 81–77 ^{OT}	4–4	21 – Oduro	11 – Oduro	5 – Polite III	EagleBank Arena (2,391); Fairfax, VA
December 3, 2022*; 2:00 p.m., MASN		Toledo	W 80–73	5–4	19 – Cooper	10 – Bailey Jr.	4 – Singleton	EagleBank Arena (3,041); Fairfax, VA
December 6, 2022*; 7:00 p.m., ESPN+		Maryland Eastern Shore	W 67–54	6–4	23 – Oduro	12 – Oduro	4 – Polite III	EagleBank Arena (2,481); Fairfax, VA
December 17, 2022*; 3:30 p.m.		vs. Tulane; Legends of Basketball Showcase	W 62–56	7–4	19 – Bailey Jr.	11 – Gaines	7 – Cooper	United Center; Chicago, IL
December 21, 2022*; 4:00 p.m., ESPN+		at Old Dominion	L 77–78	7–5	23 – Bailey Jr.	7 – Gaines	10 – Polite III	Chartway Arena (4,297); Norfolk, VA
December 23, 2022*; 4:00 p.m., ESPN+		Coppin State	W 91–53	8–5	17 – Bailey Jr.	12 – Oduro	5 – Oduro	EagleBank Arena (3,011); Fairfax, VA
A-10 regular season
December 31, 2022; 2:00 p.m., MASN2		Richmond	W 62–58	9–5 (1–0)	22 – Polite III	12 – Oduro	2 – tied	EagleBank Arena (4,014); Fairfax, VA
January 4, 2023; 7:00 p.m., ESPN+		at St. Bonaventure	L 69–73	9–6 (1–1)	21 – Bailey Jr.	11 – Polite III	5 – tied	Reilly Center (3,382); Olean, NY
January 7, 2023; 2:00 p.m., MASN2		Loyola Chicago	W 86–75	10–6 (2–1)	17 – tied	11 – Oduro	2 – tied	EagleBank Arena (3,601); Fairfax, VA
January 11, 2023; 8:00 p.m., ESPN+		at Saint Louis	L 62–63	10–7 (2–2)	26 – Oduro	12 – Oduro	5 – tied	Chaifetz Arena (5,238); St. Louis, MO
January 14, 2023; 12:00 p.m., ESPNU		Davidson	W 67–65	11–7 (3–2)	22 – Oduro	9 – Oduro	5 – Oduro	EagleBank Arena (3,212); Fairfax, VA
January 16, 2023; 4:00 p.m., CBSSN		George Washington; Revolutionary Rivalry	L 75–78	11–8 (3–3)	19 – Polite III	9 – Oduro	4 – tied	EagleBank Arena (3,906); Fairfax, VA
January 21, 2023; 12:00 p.m., ESPN+		at Rhode Island	W 79–72	12–8 (4–3)	24 – Oduro	14 – Oduro	8 – Polite III	Ryan Center (5,917); Kingston, RI
January 25, 2023; 7:00 p.m., ESPN+		at VCU; Rivalry	L 52–72	12–9 (4–4)	19 – Oduro	5 – Singleton	5 – Cooper	Siegel Center (7,637); Richmond, VA
January 29, 2023; 12:00 p.m., USA		Saint Joseph's	L 76–79	12–10 (4–5)	17 – Oduro	12 – Oduro	7 – Oduro	EagleBank Arena (4,011); Fairfax, VA
February 1, 2023; 7:00 p.m., ESPN+		UMass	W 70–59	13–10 (5–5)	18 – Fernandez	9 – Oduro	8 – Cooper	EagleBank Arena (2,805); Fairfax, VA
February 4, 2023; 2:30 p.m., USA		at Loyola Chicago	L 61–69	13–11 (5–6)	14 – tied	8 – Oduro	4 – Polite III	Joseph J. Gentile Arena (4,074); Chicago, IL
February 8, 2023; 7:00 p.m., ESPN+		at Duquesne	L 52–75	13–12 (5–7)	13 – Oduro	13 – Oduro	3 – Oduro	UPMC Cooper Fieldhouse (1,927); Pittsburgh, PA
February 11, 2023; 2:00 p.m., MASN2		Rhode Island	W 75–67	14–12 (6–7)	27 – Oduro	9 – Gaines	9 – Polite III	EagleBank Arena (3,962); Fairfax, VA
February 15, 2023; 7:00 p.m., NBCSWA		at George Washington; Revolutionary Rivalry	W 66–53	15–12 (7–7)	19 – Oduro	12 – Oduro	4 – Gaines	Charles E. Smith Center (1,377); Washington, D.C.
February 18, 2023; 4:00 p.m., MASN2		La Salle; Homecoming	W 70–66	16–12 (8–7)	25 – Oduro	9 – Cooper	6 – Polite III	EagleBank Arena (7,860); Fairfax, VA
February 25, 2023; 6:00 p.m., ESPNU		at Dayton	W 74–69	17–12 (9–7)	22 – Polite III	5 – Cooper	6 – Polite III	UD Arena (13,407); Dayton, OH
March 1, 2023; 7:00 p.m., MASN		Fordham	W 64–58 ^{OT}	18–12 (10–7)	17 – Oduro	10 – Cooper	7 – Polite III	EagleBank Arena (3,642); Fairfax, VA
March 4, 2023; 12:30 p.m., USA		at Richmond	W 62–60	19–12 (11–7)	23 – Gaines	10 – Oduro	5 – Polite III	Robins Center (7,201); Richmond, VA
A-10 tournament
March 8, 2023; 2:00 p.m., USA	(5)	vs. (12) Richmond; Second round	W 62–57	20–12	16 – tied	10 – Oduro	3 – Polite III	Barclays Center; Brooklyn, NY
March 9, 2023; 2:00 p.m., USA	(5)	vs. (4) Saint Louis; Quarterfinals	L 54–82	20–13	15 – Oduro	9 – Gaines	5 – Oduro	Barclays Center; Brooklyn, NY
*Non-conference game. ^{#}Rankings from AP poll. (#) Tournament seedings in parentheses. All times are in Eastern Time.
