= 2022–23 Hofstra Pride men's basketball team =

American college basketball season

2022–23 Hofstra Pride men's basketball

CAA regular season co-champions

NIT, Second round
- Conference: Colonial Athletic Association
- Record: 25–10 (16–2 CAA)
- Head coach: Speedy Claxton (2nd season)
- Assistant coaches: Tom Parrotta; Serge Clement; Mike DePaoli
- Home arena: Mack Sports Complex

2022–23 CAA men's basketball standings
	Conf.				Overall
Team	W		L	PCT	W		L	PCT
Hofstra	16	–	2	.889	25	–	10	.714
Charleston †	16	–	2	.889	31	–	4	.886
Towson	12	–	6	.667	21	–	12	.636
UNC Wilmington	12	–	6	.667	24	–	10	.706
Drexel	10	–	8	.556	17	–	15	.531
Delaware	8	–	10	.444	17	–	16	.515
North Carolina A&T	8	–	10	.444	13	–	19	.406
William & Mary	7	–	11	.389	13	–	20	.394
Elon	6	–	12	.333	8	–	24	.250
Stony Brook	6	–	12	.333	11	–	22	.333
Northeastern	6	–	12	.333	10	–	20	.333
Hampton	5	–	13	.278	8	–	24	.250
Monmouth	5	–	13	.278	7	–	26	.212
† 2023 CAA tournament winner

The 2022–23 Hofstra Pride men's basketball team represented Hofstra University in the 2022–23 NCAA Division I men's basketball season. The Pride, led by second-year head coach Speedy Claxton, played their home games at the Mack Sports Complex in Hempstead, New York as members of the Colonial Athletic Association (CAA). They finished the season 25–10, 16–2 CAA play, to finish in a tie with Charleston for first place.

== Previous season ==
The Pride finished the 2021–22 season 21–11, 13–5 in CAA play, to finish in third place. In the CAA tournament, they were upset by No. 6 seed Charleston in the quarterfinals.

== Roster ==
2022–23 Hofstra Pride men's basketball team
Players
Coaches

Pos.	#	Name	Height	Weight	Year	Previous school	Hometown
F	0	Warren Williams	6 ft 9 in (2.06 m)	247 lb (112 kg)	GS	Manhattan	Kingston, Jamaica
G	1	Aaron Estrada	6 ft 3 in (1.91 m)	195 lb (88 kg)	RS Sr	Oregon	Woodbury, NJ
G	2	Bryce Washington	6 ft 4 in (1.93 m)	187 lb (85 kg)	GS	Penn	Southfield, MI
G	3	Khalil Farmer	6 ft 4 in (1.93 m)	188 lb (85 kg)	Fr	Roman Catholic HS	Philadelphia, PA
G	11	Jaquan Carlos	6 ft 0 in (1.83 m)	170 lb (77 kg)	So	Thomas Jefferson HS	Brooklyn, NY
G	12	Griffin Barrouk	6 ft 4 in (1.93 m)	204 lb (93 kg)	RS Fr	Bayard Rustin HS	Glen Mills, PA
G	14	Aiden Best	5 ft 9 in (1.75 m)	150 lb (68 kg)	Fr	Lawrence Woodmere Academy	Hempstead, NY
G	15	Petey Galgano	6 ft 0 in (1.83 m)	164 lb (74 kg)	GS	Manhattanville	New Rochelle, NY
G	23	Tyler Thomas	6 ft 3 in (1.91 m)	200 lb (91 kg)	RS Sr	Sacred Heart	New Haven, CT
G	24	Amar'e Marshall	6 ft 4 in (1.93 m)	207 lb (94 kg)	RS Fr	Roselle Catholic HS	Montclair, NJ
G	25	German Plotnikov	6 ft 6 in (1.98 m)	197 lb (89 kg)	So	North Platte CC	Minsk, Belarus
F	32	Nelson Boachie-Yiadom	6 ft 8 in (2.03 m)	216 lb (98 kg)	GS	Davidson	London, England
F	33	Christian Tomasco	6 ft 9 in (2.06 m)	205 lb (93 kg)	RS Fr	Archbishop Ryan HS	Moorestown, NJ
F	34	Lual Manyang	6 ft 10 in (2.08 m)	225 lb (102 kg)	Fr	Blair Academy	Twic, South Sudan
G	55	Darlinstone Dubar	6 ft 8 in (2.03 m)	211 lb (96 kg)	So	Iowa State	Charlotte, NC

Head coach

- Speedy Claxton (Hofstra)

Assistant coach(es)

- Tom Parrotta (Fordham)
- Serge Clement (SUNY Potsdam)
- Mike DePaoli (Saint Rose)

Legend

- (C) Team captain
- (S) Suspended
- (I) Ineligible
- (W) Walk-on
- Injured
- Current redshirt

Roster
Last update: January 10, 2023

== Schedule and results ==
Date time, TV	Rank^{#}	Opponent^{#}	Result	Record	Site (attendance) city, state
Non-conference regular season
November 7, 2022*; 7:30 p.m., ESPN+		at Princeton	W 83–77	1–0	Jadwin Gymnasium (1,112); Princeton, NJ
November 11, 2022*; 7:00 p.m., FloHoops		Iona	W 83–78	2–0	Mack Sports Complex (3,707); Hempstead, NY
November 14, 2022*; 7:00 p.m., FloHoops		George Washington	W 85–80	3–0	Mack Sports Complex (1,898); Hempstead, NY
November 17, 2022*; 10:00 p.m., NBCS Bay Area		at San Jose State	W 85–76	4–0	Provident Credit Union Event Center (1,652); San Jose, CA
November 19, 2022*; 8:30 p.m., WCC Network		at Saint Mary's	L 48–76	4–1	University Credit Union Pavilion (3,274); Moraga, CA
November 25, 2022*; 7:00 p.m., BeTheBeast		vs. Middle Tennessee; Northern Classic	L 54–64	4–2	Place Bell; Laval, QC
November 26, 2022*; 2:00 p.m., BeTheBeast		vs. UNC Greensboro; Northern Classic	W 65–53	5–2	Place Bell; Laval, QC
November 27, 2022*; 4:00 p.m., BeTheBeast		vs. Quinnipiac; Northern Classic	W 72–70	6–2	Place Bell; Laval, QC
November 30, 2022*; 7:00 p.m., ESPN+		at George Mason	L 77–81 ^{OT}	6–3	EagleBank Arena (2,391); Fairfax, VA
December 7, 2022*; 7:00 p.m., BTN+		at No. 4 Purdue	L 66–85	6–4	Mackey Arena (14,876); West Lafayette, IN
December 11, 2022*; 7:00 p.m., YES		vs. UMass; Basketball Hall of Fame Invitational	L 56–71	6–5	Barclays Center; Brooklyn, NY
December 19, 2022*; 7:00 p.m., ESPN+		at South Florida	L 70–77	6–6	Yuengling Center (2,239); Tampa, FL
December 22, 2022*; 11:30 am, FloHoops		Old Westbury	W 96–48	7–6	Mack Sports Complex (2,608); Hempstead, NY
CAA regular season
December 29, 2022; 7:00 p.m., CBSSN		at Delaware	W 87–73	8–6 (1–0)	Bob Carpenter Center (2,121); Newark, DE
December 31, 2022; 1:00 p.m., FloHoops		North Carolina A&T	L 79–81	8–7 (1–1)	Mack Sports Complex (1,667); Hempstead, NY
January 5, 2023; 7:00 p.m., FloHoops		at Hampton	W 67–51	9–7 (2–1)	Hampton Convocation Center (147); Hampton, VA
January 7, 2023; 2:00 p.m., FloHoops		at William & Mary	W 75–62	10–7 (3–1)	Kaplan Arena (2,152); Williamsburg, VA
January 11, 2023; 7:00 p.m., FloHoops		Monmouth	W 77–57	11–7 (4–1)	Mack Sports Complex (1,427); Hempstead, NY
January 14, 2023; 2:00 p.m., FloHoops		Delaware	W 86–62	12–7 (5–1)	Mack Sports Complex (2,037); Hempstead, NY
January 16, 2023; 12:00 p.m., FloHoops		at Towson	L 47–68	12–8 (5–2)	SECU Arena (2,155); Towson, MD
January 19, 2023; 7:00 p.m., CBSSN		UNC Wilmington	W 70–46	13–8 (6–2)	Mack Sports Complex (1,732); Hempstead, NY
January 26, 2023; 7:00 p.m., FloHoops		at Elon	W 82–65	14–8 (7–2)	Schar Center (1,493); Elon, NC
January 28, 2023; 4:00 p.m., FloHoops		at No. 18 College of Charleston	W 85–81	15–8 (8–2)	TD Arena (5,109); Charleston, SC
February 2, 2023; 7:00 p.m., FloHoops		Towson	W 76–72	16–8 (9–2)	Mack Sports Complex (2,023); Hempstead, NY
February 4, 2023; 4:00 p.m., FloHoops		Stony Brook	W 79–58	17–8 (10–2)	Mack Sports Complex (3,901); Hempstead, NY
February 8, 2023; 6:00 p.m., CBSSN		at Northeastern	W 72–53	18–8 (11–2)	Matthews Arena (899); Boston, MA
February 11, 2023; 2:00 p.m., SNY/FloHoops		at Monmouth	W 86–57	19–8 (12–2)	OceanFirst Bank Center (2,109); West Long Branch, NJ
February 13, 2023; 7:00 p.m., FloHoops		Drexel	W 66–52	20–8 (13–2)	Mack Sports Complex (1,784); Hempstead, NY
February 16, 2023; 7:00 p.m., FloHoops		Hampton	W 73–43	21–8 (14–2)	Mack Sports Complex (1,833); Hempstead, NY
February 18, 2023; 6:30 p.m., SNY/FloHoops		at Stony Brook	W 68–65	22–8 (15–2)	Island Federal Arena (4,009); Stony Brook, NY
February 25, 2023; 2:00 p.m., FloHoops		Northeastern	W 84–52	23–8 (16–2)	Mack Sports Complex (3,616); Hempstead, NY
CAA tournament
March 5, 2023; 12:00 p.m., FloHoops	(1)	vs. (8) William & Mary; Quarterfinals	W 94–46	24–8	Entertainment and Sports Arena; Washington, D.C.
March 6, 2023; 6:00 p.m., CBSSN	(1)	vs. (4) UNC Wilmington; Semifinals	L 73–79 ^{OT}	24–9	Entertainment and Sports Arena; Washington, D.C.
NIT
March 14, 2023; 7:00 p.m., ESPNU		at (1) Rutgers; First round – Rutgers Bracket	W 88–86 ^{OT}	25–9	Jersey Mike's Arena (5,017); Piscataway, NJ
March 18, 2023; 2:00 p.m., ESPN+		(4) Cincinnati; Second round – Rutgers Bracket	L 65–79	25–10	Mack Sports Complex (2,228); Hempstead, NY
*Non-conference game. ^{#}Rankings from AP poll. (#) Tournament seedings in parentheses. All times are in Eastern.
