= 2022–23 La Salle Explorers men's basketball team =

American college basketball season

2022–23 La Salle Explorers men's basketball
- Conference: Atlantic 10 Conference
- Record: 15–19 (7–11 A–10)
- Head coach: Fran Dunphy (1st season)
- Assistant coaches: John Cox; Donnie Carr; Mark Hueber
- Home arena: Tom Gola Arena

2022–23 Atlantic 10 men's basketball standings
	Conf.				Overall
Team	W		L	PCT	W		L	PCT
VCU †	15	–	3	.833	27	–	8	.771
Fordham	12	–	6	.667	25	–	8	.758
Dayton	12	–	6	.667	22	–	12	.647
Saint Louis	12	–	6	.667	21	–	12	.636
George Mason	11	–	7	.611	20	–	13	.606
Duquesne	10	–	8	.556	20	–	13	.606
George Washington	10	–	8	.556	16	–	16	.500
Davidson	8	–	10	.444	16	–	16	.500
Saint Joseph's	8	–	10	.444	16	–	17	.485
St. Bonaventure	8	–	10	.444	14	–	18	.438
Richmond	7	–	11	.389	15	–	18	.455
La Salle	7	–	11	.389	15	–	19	.441
Massachusetts	6	–	12	.333	15	–	16	.484
Rhode Island	5	–	13	.278	9	–	22	.290
Loyola Chicago	4	–	14	.222	10	–	21	.323
† 2023 A10 tournament winner

The 2022–23 La Salle Explorers men's basketball team represented La Salle University during the 2022–23 NCAA Division I men's basketball season. The Explorers, led by first-year head coach Fran Dunphy, played their home games at Tom Gola Arena in Philadelphia, Pennsylvania as members of the Atlantic 10 Conference.

== Previous season ==
The Explorers finished the 2021–22 season 11–19, 5–13 in A-10 play to finish in a tie for 12th place. As the No. 12 seed in the A-10 tournament, they defeated Saint Joseph's in the first round before losing to Saint Louis in the second round.

On March 21, 2022, the school fired head coach Ashley Howard. On April 5, the school announced former Penn and Temple head coach, Fran Dunphy, would be the team's new head coach.

== Offseason ==
=== Departures ===
Name	Number	Pos.	Height	Weight	Year	Hometown	Reason for departure
Sherif Kenney	4	G	6'4"	215	Junior	Washington, D.C.	Transferred to Bryant
Jack Clark	5	G	6'8"	200	RS Junior	Wyncote, PA	Transferred to NC State
Tegra Izay	11	C	6'10"	265	Sophomore	Montreal, QC	Transferred to Harcum College
Kyle Thompson	12	G	5'10"	200	RS Junior	Horsham, PA	Graduate transferred
Clifton Moore	21	F/C	6'10"	240	RS Senior	Horsham, PA	Graduate transferred to Providence
Chrisitan Ray	24	G	6'6"	215	Junior	Gap, PA	Transferred to Delaware
Andrew Lafond	25	G	5'10"	150	Senior	Philadelphia, PA	Walk-on; left the team for personal reasons
Brandon Dwyer	30	G	6'3"	180	Freshman	Newark, DE	Walk-on; transferred to Florida Gulf Coast

=== Incoming transfers ===
Name	Num	Pos.	Height	Weight	Year	Hometown	Previous School
Hassan Drame	4	F	6'7"	200	Senior	Bamako, Mali	Saint Peter's
Fousseyni Drame	11	F	6'7"	200	Senior	Bamako, Mali	Saint Peter's
Tommy Gardler	12	G	6'1"	185	Sophomore	Broomall, PA	Walk-on; USciences

=== 2022 recruiting class ===
College recruiting information
Name	Hometown	School	Height	Weight	Commit date
Jorge Sánchez-Ramos; PG	Spain	Get Better Academy	6 ft 3 in (1.91 m)	N/A	Jul 17, 2022
Jorge Sánchez-Ramos; PG	Recruit ratings: No ratings found				
Lucas Mercandino; SF	Córdoba, Argentina	Club Comunicaciones	6 ft 6 in (1.98 m)	N/A	Jun 22, 2022
Lucas Mercandino; SF	Recruit ratings: No ratings found				
Ryan Zan; PF	Somerset, NJ	Rutgers Prep School	6 ft 7 in (2.01 m)	N/A	Jul 27, 2022
Ryan Zan; PF	Recruit ratings: No ratings found				
Rokas Jocius; C	Kaunas, Lithuania	BC Rytas Vilnius	6 ft 10 in (2.08 m)	N/A	Apr 23, 2022
Rokas Jocius; C	Recruit ratings: No ratings found				
Overall recruit ranking:
Note: In many cases, Scout, Rivals, 247Sports, On3, and ESPN may conflict in their listings of height and weight.; In these cases, the average was taken. ESPN grades are on a 100-point scale.; Sources: "2022 Team Ranking". Rivals.

== Roster ==
2022–23 La Salle Explorers men's basketball team
Players
Coaches

Pos.	#	Name	Height	Weight	Year	Previous school	Hometown
G	0	Andrés Marrero	6 ft 5 in (1.96 m)	200 lb (91 kg)	RS Fr	Upper Room Christian School (NY)	Caracas, Venezuela
G	1	Charles Ireland (W)	6 ft 2 in (1.88 m)	165 lb (75 kg)	So	La Salle College	Glenside, PA
G	2	Jhamir Brickus	5 ft 11 in (1.8 m)	205 lb (93 kg)	Jr	Coatesville	Coatesville, PA
G	3	Anwar Gill	6 ft 4 in (1.93 m)	205 lb (93 kg)	Jr	Montverde Academy	Washington, D.C.
F	4	Hassan Drame	6 ft 7 in (2.01 m)	200 lb (91 kg)	Sr	Our Savior New American; Saint Peter's	Bamako, Mali
G	5	Khlil Brantley	6 ft 1 in (1.85 m)	175 lb (79 kg)	So	Our Savior Lutheran	Bronx, NY
G	10	Josh Nickelberry	6 ft 4 in (1.93 m)	205 lb (93 kg)	Sr	Northwood Temple Academy; Louisville	Fayetteville, NC
F	11	Fousseyni Drame	6 ft 7 in (2.01 m)	200 lb (91 kg)	Sr	Our Savior New American; Saint Peter's	Bamako, Mali
G	12	Tommy Gardler (W)	6 ft 1 in (1.85 m)	165 lb (75 kg)	So	The Phelps School; USciences	Broomall, PA
G	13	Daeshon Shepherd	6 ft 5 in (1.96 m)	200 lb (91 kg)	So	Archbishop Wood	Philadelphia, PA
F	14	Mamadou Doucoure	6 ft 9 in (2.06 m)	250 lb (113 kg)	GS	Our Savior New American School; Rutgers	Bamako, Mali
F	21	Ryan Zan	6 ft 7 in (2.01 m)	200 lb (91 kg)	Fr	Rutgers Prep	Princeton, NJ
G	24	Jorge Sanchez-Ramos	6 ft 2 in (1.88 m)	160 lb (73 kg)	Fr	Colegio Peñalar	Torrelodones, Spain
G/F	25	Lucas Mercandino	6 ft 6 in (1.98 m)	170 lb (77 kg)	Fr	IPEM 21 Alfonsina Storni	Córdoba, Argentina
G	35	Rokas Jocius	6 ft 10 in (2.08 m)	260 lb (118 kg)	Fr	Vilniaus Perlas Energija	Kaunas, Lithuania

Head coach

- Fran Dunphy (La Salle)

Assistant coach(es)

- Kyle Griffin (Siena)
- Donnie Carr (La Salle)
- Mark Hueber (Immaculata)

Legend

- (C) Team captain
- (S) Suspended
- (I) Ineligible
- (W) Walk-on
- Injured
- Current redshirt

Roster

== Schedule and results ==
Date time, TV	Rank^{#}	Opponent^{#}	Result	Record	Site (attendance) city, state
Non-conference regular season
November 7, 2022*; 6:30 p.m., FS1		at No. 16 Villanova; Philadelphia Big 5	L 68–81	0–1	Finneran Pavilion (6,501); Villanova, PA
November 12, 2022*; 3:00 p.m., ESPN+		Wagner	W 77–69	1–1	Tom Gola Arena (2,517); Philadelphia, PA
November 15, 2022*; 7:00 p.m., ESPN+		Queens (NC); Jamaica Classic campus site game	W 72–60	2–1	Tom Gola Arena (1,027); Philadelphia, PA
November 18, 2022*; 2:00 p.m., CBSSN		vs. Wake Forest; Jamaica Classic Semifinal	L 63–75	2–2	Montego Bay Convention Centre; Montego Bay, Jamaica
November 20, 2022*; 12:00 p.m., CBSSN		vs. Georgetown; Jamaica Classic Consolation	L 62–69	2–3	Montego Bay Convention Centre; Montego Bay, Jamaica
November 26, 2022*; 2:00 p.m., ESPN+		Binghamton	W 65–62	3–3	Tom Gola Arena (1,247); Philadelphia, PA
November 30, 2022*; 6:00 p.m., ESPN+		vs. Temple; Philadelphia Big 5	L 51–67	3–4	Palestra; Philadelphia, PA
December 3, 2022*; 3:00 p.m., ESPN+		at Penn; Philadelphia Big 5	W 84–81 ^{OT}	4–4	Palestra (1,739); Philadelphia, PA
December 6, 2022*; 7:00 p.m., ESPN+		Bucknell	W 82–72	5–4	Tom Gola Arena (1,362); Philadelphia, PA
December 10, 2022*; 12:00 p.m., USA		Drexel; City 6	L 58–65 ^{OT}	5–5	Tom Gola Arena (1,781); Philadelphia, PA
December 17, 2022*; 2:00 p.m., ESPN+		at Cincinnati	L 60–78	5–6	Fifth Third Arena (8,869); Cincinnati, OH
December 21, 2022*; 2:00 p.m., ESPN+		Lafayette	L 65–90	5–7	Tom Gola Arena (1,071); Philadelphia, PA
December 29, 2022*; 2:00 p.m.		at Howard	W 80–76	6–7	Burr Gymnasium (539); Washington, D.C.
Atlantic 10 regular season
December 31, 2022; 2:00 p.m., ESPN+		at VCU	L 67–80	6–8 (0–1)	Siegel Center (7,323); Richmond, VA
January 7, 2023; 2:00 p.m., ESPN+		Rhode Island	W 77–75 ^{OT}	7–8 (1–1)	Tom Gola Arena (1,571); Philadelphia, PA
January 11, 2023; 7:00 p.m., ESPN+		at UMass	W 78–77	8–8 (2–1)	Mullins Center (2,853); Amherst, MA
January 14, 2023; 3:00 p.m., ESPN+		Fordham	L 64–66	8–9 (2–2)	Tom Gola Arena (1,611); Philadelphia, PA
January 16, 2023; 2:00 p.m., CBSSN		Saint Joseph's	L 59–71	8–10 (2–3)	Tom Gola Arena (2,134); Philadelphia, PA
January 21, 2023; 2:30 p.m., USA		at Saint Louis	L 71–84	8–11 (2–4)	Chaifetz Arena (7,523); St. Louis, MO
January 24, 2023; 2:00 p.m., ESPN+		Davidson	L 57–64	8–12 (2–5)	Tom Gola Arena (1,184); Philadelphia, PA
January 28, 2023; 2:00 p.m., ESPN+		at Rhode Island	L 70–72	8–13 (2–6)	Ryan Center (6,530); Kingston, RI
February 1, 2023; 7:00 p.m., ESPN+		George Washington	W 75–64	9–13 (3–6)	Tom Gola Arena (1,176); Philadelphia, PA
February 5, 2023; 12:00 p.m., ESPNU		at Saint Joseph's	W 73–65	10–13 (4–6)	Hagan Arena (2,213); Philadelphia, PA
February 8, 2023; 7:00 p.m., ESPN+		at St. Bonaventure	W 76–70	11–13 (5–6)	Reilly Center (3,798); Olean, NY
February 11, 2023; 2:00 p.m., ESPN+		UMass	W 86–72	12–13 (6–6)	Tom Gola Arena (2,019); Philadelphia, PA
February 15, 2023; 7:00 p.m., ESPN+		Richmond	W 68–62	13–13 (7–6)	Tom Gola Arena (1,352); Philadelphia, PA
February 18, 2023; 4:00 p.m., ESPN+		at George Mason	L 66–70	13–14 (7–7)	EagleBank Arena; Fairfax, VA
February 22, 2023; 7:00 p.m., ESPN+		Duquesne	L 74–91	13–15 (7–8)	Tom Gola Arena (1,473); Philadelphia, PA
February 25, 2023; 6:00 p.m., ESPN+		at George Washington	L 85–92	13–16 (7–9)	Charles E. Smith Center (1,457); Washington, D.C.
February 28, 2023; 7:00 p.m., NBC Digital		at Dayton	L 53–77	13–17 (7–10)	UD Arena (13,407); Dayton, OH
March 4, 2023; 2:00 p.m., ESPN+		Loyola Chicago	L 73–76	13–18 (7–11)	Tom Gola Arena (2,176); Philadelphia, PA
Atlantic 10 tournament
March 7, 2023; 4:30 p.m., ESPN+	(11)	vs. (14) Rhode Island; First round	W 73–56	14–18	Barclays Center (5,119); Brooklyn, NY
March 8, 2023; 7:30 p.m., USA	(11)	vs. (6) Duquesne; Second round	W 81–70	15–18	Barclays Center (4,201); Brooklyn, NY
March 9, 2023; 7:30 p.m., USA	(11)	vs. (3) Fordham; Quarterfinals	L 61–69	15–19	Barclays Center (8,595); Brooklyn, NY
*Non-conference game. ^{#}Rankings from AP Poll. (#) Tournament seedings in parentheses. All times are in Eastern Time.
