= 2022–23 Fordham Rams men's basketball team =

American college basketball season

2022–23 Fordham Rams men's basketball

Tom Konchalski Classic champions
- Conference: Atlantic 10
- Record: 25–8 (12–6 A–10)
- Head coach: Keith Urgo (1st season)
- Associate head coach: Tray Woodall
- Assistant coaches: Dave Paulsen; Ronald Ramón
- Home arena: Rose Hill Gymnasium

2022–23 Atlantic 10 men's basketball standings
	Conf.				Overall
Team	W		L	PCT	W		L	PCT
VCU †	15	–	3	.833	27	–	8	.771
Fordham	12	–	6	.667	25	–	8	.758
Dayton	12	–	6	.667	22	–	12	.647
Saint Louis	12	–	6	.667	21	–	12	.636
George Mason	11	–	7	.611	20	–	13	.606
Duquesne	10	–	8	.556	20	–	13	.606
George Washington	10	–	8	.556	16	–	16	.500
Davidson	8	–	10	.444	16	–	16	.500
Saint Joseph's	8	–	10	.444	16	–	17	.485
St. Bonaventure	8	–	10	.444	14	–	18	.438
Richmond	7	–	11	.389	15	–	18	.455
La Salle	7	–	11	.389	15	–	19	.441
Massachusetts	6	–	12	.333	15	–	16	.484
Rhode Island	5	–	13	.278	9	–	22	.290
Loyola Chicago	4	–	14	.222	10	–	21	.323
† 2023 A10 tournament winner

The 2022–23 Fordham Rams men's basketball team represented Fordham University during the 2022–23 NCAA Division I men's basketball season. The Rams, led by first-year head coach Keith Urgo, played their home games at Rose Hill Gymnasium in The Bronx, New York as a member of the Atlantic 10 Conference. This was the Rams' first 20-win season since the 1990–91 season. They finished the season 25-8, 12-6 in A-10 Play for a three-way tie for 2nd place. They defeated La Salle in the quarterfinals of the Atlantic 10 Tournament before losing to Dayton in the semifinals. Despite having 25 wins, they didn’t participate in a postseason tournament.

== Previous season ==
The Rams finished the 2021–22 season 16–16, 8–10 in A-10 play to finish in eighth place. They defeated George Washington in the second round of the A-10 tournament before losing to Davidson in the quarterfinals.

On April 20, 2022, following the retirement of Villanova head coach Jay Wright, head coach Kyle Neptune left the school to become the head coach of the Wildcats. On April 26, the school named associate head coach Keith Urgo the team's new head coach.

== Offseason ==
=== Departures ===
Name	Number	Pos.	Height	Weight	Year	Hometown	Reason for departure
Kam'Ron Cunningham	0	G	6'7"	205	Senior	Greenville, SC	Graduate transferred to Coppin State
Chuba Ohams	1	F	6'9"	220	RS Senior	Bronx, NY	Graduated
Jalen Cobb	2	G	6'1"	165	Junior	Atlanta, GA	Transferred to Mercer
DJ Gordon	4	G	6'5"	175	Sophomore	Pittsburgh, PA	Mid season transferred to Jacksonville State
Antonio Daye, Jr.	5	G	6'3"	200	Senior	Durham, NC	Mid season transferred to Coastal Carolina
Josh Navarro	21	G	5'10"	170	RS Senior	Carolina, PR	Graduated
Ahmad Harrison	50	G	6'1"	190	Freshman	Baltimore, MD	Transferred to Harcum College

=== Incoming transfers ===
Name	Number	Pos.	Height	Weight	Year	Hometown	Previous School
Khalid Moore	2	F	6'7"	208	GS Senior	Briarwood, NY	Georgia Tech

=== Recruiting classes ===
==== 2022 recruiting class ====
College recruiting information
Name	Hometown	School	Height	Weight	Commit date
Will Richardson; PG	Oradell, NJ	Bergen Catholic High School	6 ft 2 in (1.88 m)	160 lb (73 kg)	Oct 11, 2021
Will Richardson; PG	Recruit ratings: Rivals: 247Sports:				
Noah Best; SG	Bronx, NY	Mount Saint Michael Academy	6 ft 4 in (1.93 m)	175 lb (79 kg)	May 17, 2022
Noah Best; SG	Recruit ratings: Rivals: 247Sports:				
Angel Montas; SF	Kissimmee, FL	Life Academy	6 ft 5 in (1.96 m)	210 lb (95 kg)	Apr 8, 2022
Angel Montas; SF	Recruit ratings: Rivals: 247Sports:				
Romad Dean; SF	Toronto, ON	Crestwood Prep	6 ft 7 in (2.01 m)	185 lb (84 kg)	Mar 18, 2022
Romad Dean; SF	Recruit ratings: 247Sports:				
Elijah Gray; SF	Charlotte, NC	Ardrey Kell High School	6 ft 6 in (1.98 m)	190 lb (86 kg)	Mar 18, 2022
Elijah Gray; SF	Recruit ratings: 247Sports:				
Overall recruit ranking:
Note: In many cases, Scout, Rivals, 247Sports, On3, and ESPN may conflict in their listings of height and weight.; In these cases, the average was taken. ESPN grades are on a 100-point scale.; Sources: "2022 Team Ranking". Rivals.

==== 2023 recruiting class ====
College recruiting information (2023)
Name	Hometown	School	Height	Weight	Commit date
Alex Bates IV; SG	Matthews, NC	United Faith Christian Academy	6 ft 5 in (1.96 m)	N/A	Sep 12, 2022
Alex Bates IV; SG	Recruit ratings: No ratings found				
Overall recruit ranking:
Note: In many cases, Scout, Rivals, 247Sports, On3, and ESPN may conflict in their listings of height and weight.; In these cases, the average was taken. ESPN grades are on a 100-point scale.; Sources: "2023 Team Ranking". Rivals.

== Roster ==
2022–23 Fordham Rams men's basketball team
Players
Coaches

Pos.	#	Name	Height	Weight	Year	Previous school	Hometown
G	1	Will Richardson	6 ft 3 in (1.91 m)	170 lb (77 kg)	Fr	Bergen Catholic High School	Teaneck, New Jersey
F	2	Khalid Moore	6 ft 7 in (2.01 m)	208 lb (94 kg)	GS	Georgia Tech	Briarwood, New York
G	3	Darius Quisenberry	6 ft 1 in (1.85 m)	188 lb (85 kg)	GS	Youngstown State	Springfield, Ohio
G	4	Noah Best	6 ft 5 in (1.96 m)	175 lb (79 kg)	Fr	Mount Saint Michael Academy	Bronx, New York
F	5	Angel Montas	6 ft 6 in (1.98 m)	228 lb (103 kg)	Fr	Life Christian Academy (FL)	La Romana, DR
G	10	Kyle Rose	6 ft 4 in (1.93 m)	192 lb (87 kg)	Jr	Eleanor Roosevelt High School	Upper Marlboro, Maryland
F	11	Romad Dean	6 ft 7 in (2.01 m)	210 lb (95 kg)	Fr	Mount Saint Michael Academy	Freeport, Bahamas
F	12	Elijah Gray	6 ft 8 in (2.03 m)	220 lb (100 kg)	Fr	Hargrave Military Academy	Charlotte, NC
G	13	Zach Riley	6 ft 5 in (1.96 m)	195 lb (88 kg)	So	Rangitoto College	Auckland, New Zealand
G	14	Albe Evans (W)	5 ft 11 in (1.8 m)	160 lb (73 kg)	Jr	Schuylkill Haven High School	Schuylkill Haven, Pennsylvania
C	15	Rostyslav Novitskyi	6 ft 10 in (2.08 m)	225 lb (102 kg)	Sr	Seward County Community College	Kyiv, Ukraine
G	22	Brian Nussbaum (W)	5 ft 11 in (1.8 m)	160 lb (73 kg)	So	The Winchendon School	South Salem, New York
F	23	Patrick Kelly	6 ft 8 in (2.03 m)	223 lb (101 kg)	RS So	Penn State	Raleigh, North Carolina
G	24	Antrell Charlton	6 ft 5 in (1.96 m)	205 lb (93 kg)	Jr	Seward County Community College	Live Oak, Florida
G	25	Luke Hardenburg (W)	6 ft 6 in (1.98 m)	183 lb (83 kg)	Fr	Highland Park High School	Dallas, Texas
F	30	Abdou Tsimbila	6 ft 9 in (2.06 m)	245 lb (111 kg)	Jr	Penn State	Yaoundé, Cameroon
G	31	Wayne Franklin (W)	6 ft 1 in (1.85 m)	185 lb (84 kg)	Fr	Paramus Catholic High School	Paramus, New Jersey

Head coach

- Keith Urgo (Fairfield)

Assistant coach(es)

- Tray Woodall (Pittsburgh)
- Dave Paulsen (Williams)
- Ronald Ramón (Pittsburgh)

Legend

- (C) Team captain
- (S) Suspended
- (I) Ineligible
- (W) Walk-on
- Injured
- Current redshirt

Roster

== Schedule and results ==
Date time, TV	Rank^{#}	Opponent^{#}	Result	Record	Site (attendance) city, state
Non-conference regular season
November 7, 2022*; 7:30 p.m., ESPN+		Dartmouth	W 88–74	1–0	Rose Hill Gymnasium (752); Bronx, NY
November 11, 2022*; 8:00 p.m., SECN+		at No. 10 Arkansas	L 48–74	1–1	Bud Walton Arena (19,200); Fayetteville, AR
November 15, 2022*; 7:00 p.m., SNY/ESPN+		New Hampshire	W 79–61	2–1	Rose Hill Gymnasium (415); Bronx, NY
November 19, 2022*; 5:00 p.m., SNY/ESPN+		UIC; Tom Konchalski Classic	W 79–65	3–1	Rose Hill Gymnasium (681); Bronx, NY
November 21, 2022*; 7:00 p.m., SNY/ESPN+		Holy Cross; Tom Konchalski Classic	W 67–53	4–1	Rose Hill Gymnasium (450); Bronx, NY
November 22, 2022*; 7:00 p.m., SNY/ESPN+		Stonehill; Tom Konchalski Classic	W 71–60	5–1	Rose Hill Gymnasium (373); Bronx, NY
November 27, 2022*; 1:30 p.m., SNY/ESPN+		Harvard	W 68–60	6–1	Rose Hill Gymnasium (1,015); Bronx, NY
November 30, 2022*; 7:30 p.m., ESPN+		Maine	W 72–67	7–1	Rose Hill Gymnasium (319); Bronx, NY
December 3, 2022*; 11:30 a.m., ESPN+		at Tulane	W 95–90	8–1	Devlin Fieldhouse (1,383); New Orleans, LA
December 6, 2022*; 7:00 p.m., SNY/ESPN+		Wagner	W 72–59	9–1	Rose Hill Gymnasium (660); Bronx, NY
December 9, 2022*; 7:00 p.m., SNY/ESPN+		Binghamton	W 77–62	10–1	Rose Hill Gymnasium (607); Bronx, NY
December 11, 2022*; 1:00 p.m., ESPN+		Central Connecticut	W 90–77	11–1	Rose Hill Gymnasium (274); Bronx, NY
December 22, 2022*; 12:00 p.m., SNY/ESPN+		VMI	W 80–77 ^{OT}	12–1	Rose Hill Gymnasium (1,500); Bronx, NY
Atlantic 10 regular season
December 28, 2022; 7:00 p.m., CBSSN		Davidson	L 43–57	12–2 (0–1)	Rose Hill Gymnasium (1,700); Bronx, NY
January 4, 2023; 7:00 p.m., ESPN+		at Rhode Island	L 79–82	12–3 (0–2)	Ryan Center (3,683); Kingston, RI
January 7, 2023; 2:00 p.m., SNY/ESPN+		Saint Joseph's	W 66–54	13–3 (1–2)	Rose Hill Gymnasium (1,259); Bronx, NY
January 10, 2023; 7:00 p.m., ESPN+		Dayton	L 58–82	13–4 (1–3)	Rose Hill Gymnasium (1,700); Bronx, NY
January 14, 2023; 3:00 p.m., ESPN+		at La Salle	W 66–64	14–4 (2–3)	Tom Gola Arena (1,611); Philadelphia, PA
January 21, 2023; 2:00 p.m., ESPN+		at Duquesne	W 65–58	15–4 (3–3)	UPMC Cooper Fieldhouse (2,932); Pittsburgh, PA
January 25, 2023; 7:00 p.m., ESPN+		at St. Bonaventure	W 79–68	16–4 (4–3)	Reilly Center (3,854); Olean, NY
January 28, 2023; 2:00 p.m., ESPN+		George Washington	W 85–70	17–4 (5–3)	Rose Hill Gymnasium (1,734); Bronx, NY
January 31, 2023; 7:00 p.m., SNY/ESPN+		Saint Louis	W 75–65	18–4 (6–3)	Rose Hill Gymnasium (1,800); Bronx, NY
February 5, 2023; 12:00 p.m., USA		at Richmond	L 58–68	18–5 (6–4)	Robins Center (7,201); Richmond, VA
February 8, 2023; 7:00 p.m., SNY/ESPN+		UMass	W 77–67	19–5 (7–4)	Rose Hill Gymnasium (1,808); Bronx, NY
February 11, 2023; 2:30 p.m., USA		at Davidson	W 73–71	20–5 (8–4)	John M. Belk Arena (4,091); Davidson, NC
February 15, 2023; 7:00 p.m., SNY/ESPN+		St. Bonaventure	W 78–63	21–5 (9–4)	Rose Hill Gymnasium (1,808); Bronx, NY
February 18, 2023; 2:30 p.m., USA		at VCU	L 61–80	21–6 (9–5)	Siegel Center (7,637); Richmond, VA
February 22, 2023; 9:00 p.m., ESPN+		at Loyola Chicago	W 71–69	22–6 (10–5)	Joseph J. Gentile Arena (2,871); Chicago, IL
February 25, 2023; 2:30 p.m., USA		Rhode Island	W 74–71	23–6 (11–5)	Rose Hill Gymnasium (1,808); Bronx, NY
March 1, 2023; 7:00 p.m., ESPN+		at George Mason	L 58–64 ^{OT}	23–7 (11–6)	EagleBank Arena (3,642); Fairfax, VA
March 4, 2023; 2:00 p.m., SNY/ESPN+		Duquesne	W 87–60	24–7 (12–6)	Rose Hill Gymnasium (1,808); Bronx, NY
Atlantic 10 tournament
March 9, 2023; 7:30 p.m., USA	(3)	vs. (11) La Salle; Quarterfinals	W 69–61	25–7	Barclays Center (8,595); Brooklyn, NY
March 11, 2023; 3:30 p.m., CBSSN	(3)	vs. (2) Dayton; Semifinals	L 68–78	25–8	Barclays Center (10,156); Brooklyn, NY
*Non-conference game. ^{#}Rankings from AP Poll. (#) Tournament seedings in parentheses. All times are in Eastern Time.
