= 2022–23 Rhode Island Rams men's basketball team =

American college basketball season

2022–23 Rhode Island Rams men's basketball
- Conference: Atlantic 10 Conference
- Record: 9–22 (5–13 A-10)
- Head coach: Archie Miller (1st season)
- Assistant coaches: Kenny Johnson; Duane Woodward; Austin Carroll
- Home arena: Ryan Center

2022–23 Atlantic 10 men's basketball standings
	Conf.				Overall
Team	W		L	PCT	W		L	PCT
VCU †	15	–	3	.833	27	–	8	.771
Fordham	12	–	6	.667	25	–	8	.758
Dayton	12	–	6	.667	22	–	12	.647
Saint Louis	12	–	6	.667	21	–	12	.636
George Mason	11	–	7	.611	20	–	13	.606
Duquesne	10	–	8	.556	20	–	13	.606
George Washington	10	–	8	.556	16	–	16	.500
Davidson	8	–	10	.444	16	–	16	.500
Saint Joseph's	8	–	10	.444	16	–	17	.485
St. Bonaventure	8	–	10	.444	14	–	18	.438
Richmond	7	–	11	.389	15	–	18	.455
La Salle	7	–	11	.389	15	–	19	.441
Massachusetts	6	–	12	.333	15	–	16	.484
Rhode Island	5	–	13	.278	9	–	22	.290
Loyola Chicago	4	–	14	.222	10	–	21	.323
† 2023 A10 tournament winner

The 2022–23 Rhode Island Rams basketball team represented the University of Rhode Island during the 2022–23 NCAA Division I men's basketball season. The Rams, led by first-year head coach Archie Miller, played their home games at the Ryan Center in Kingston, Rhode Island as members of the Atlantic 10 Conference.

== Previous season ==
The Rams finished the 2021–22 season 15–16, 5–12 in A-10 play, to finish in 11th place. They defeated Duquesne in the first round of the A-10 tournament before losing to Richmond in the second round.

On March 11, 2022, the school fired head coach David Cox. On March 18, the school hired former Dayton and Indiana head coach Archie Miller as the team's new head coach.

== Offseason ==
=== Departures ===
Name	Number	Pos.	Height	Weight	Year	Hometown	Reason for departure
Jeremy Sheppard	2	G	6'1"	165	RS Senior	Richmond, VA	Graduated
Allen Betrand	4	G	6'6"	205	Senior	Philadelphia, PA	Graduate transferred to Rider
Antwan Walker	5	F	6'7"	230	RS Senior	Washington, D.C.	Graduate transferred to Bryant
Tres Berry	13	G	6'4"	190	Sophomore	Cleveland, TN	Transferred to Charleston Southern
Makhi Mitchell	21	C	6'9"	230	RS Junior	Washington, D.C.	Transferred to Arkansas
Makhel Mitchell	22	C	6'10"	245	RS Junior	Washington, D.C.	Transferred to Arkansas
Ileri Ayo-Faleye	24	F	6'7"	185	Sophomore	Lebanon, PA	Transferred to Vermont
Ishmael El-Amin	42	G	6'3"	180	RS Senior	Minneapolis, MN	Graduated

=== Incoming transfers ===
Name	Number	Pos.	Height	Weight	Year	Hometown	Previous school
Anthony Harris	0	G	6'4"	195	RS Sophomore	Woodbridge, VA	North Carolina
Brayon Freeman	2	G	6'2"	180	Freshman	Washington, D.C.	George Washington
Brandon Weston	20	G/F	6'5"	200	Sophomore	Brooklyn, NY	Seton Hall
Josaphat Bilau	21	F	6'10"		RS Sophomore	La Roche-sur-Yon, France	New Mexico JC
Alex Tchikou	22	F	6'11'	230	RS Sophomore	Paris, France	Alabama

=== Recruiting classes ===
==== 2022 recruiting class ====
College recruiting information
Name	Hometown	School	Height	Weight	Commit date
Louis Hutchinson; SG	Bradenton, FL	Long Island Lutheran	6 ft 6 in (1.98 m)	185 lb (84 kg)	May 4, 2022
Louis Hutchinson; SG	Recruit ratings: Scout: Rivals: (NR)				
Rory Stewart; PF	London, England	Orangeville Prep	6 ft 9 in (2.06 m)	N/A	Apr 7, 2022
Rory Stewart; PF	Recruit ratings: Scout: Rivals: (NR)				
Jeremy Foumena; C	Montreal, QC	Orangeville Prep	6 ft 11 in (2.11 m)	N/A	Apr 1, 2022
Jeremy Foumena; C	Recruit ratings: Scout: Rivals: (NR)				
Overall recruit ranking:
Note: In many cases, Scout, Rivals, 247Sports, On3, and ESPN may conflict in their listings of height and weight.; In these cases, the average was taken. ESPN grades are on a 100-point scale.; Sources: "2022 Team Ranking". Rivals.

==== 2023 recruiting class ====
College recruiting information (2023)
Name	Hometown	School	Height	Weight	Commit date
Connor Dubsky; SG	Woodbridge, VA	Putnam Science Academy	6 ft 4 in (1.93 m)	190 lb (86 kg)	Aug 12, 2022
Connor Dubsky; SG	Recruit ratings: Scout: Rivals: (NR)				
Adrian Myers; SF	Stephens City, VA	Massanutten Military Academy	6 ft 7 in (2.01 m)	185 lb (84 kg)	Jul 9, 2022
Adrian Myers; SF	Recruit ratings: Scout: Rivals: (NR)				
K.C. Nwafor; PF	Rotorua, New Zealand	Rotorua Boys' High School	6 ft 7 in (2.01 m)	N/A	Apr 30, 2022
K.C. Nwafor; PF	Recruit ratings: Scout: Rivals: (NR)				
Overall recruit ranking:
Note: In many cases, Scout, Rivals, 247Sports, On3, and ESPN may conflict in their listings of height and weight.; In these cases, the average was taken. ESPN grades are on a 100-point scale.; Sources: "2023 Team Ranking". Rivals.

== Roster ==
2022–23 Rhode Island Rams men's basketball team
Players
Coaches

Pos.	#	Name	Height	Weight	Year	Previous school	Hometown
G	0	Anthony Harris	6 ft 4 in (1.93 m)	195 lb (88 kg)	RS So	Paul VI Catholic; North Carolina	Woodbridge, VA
F	1	Abdou Samb	6 ft 8 in (2.03 m)	210 lb (95 kg)	So	Frederick Douglass	Upper Marlboro, MD
G	2	Brayon Freeman	6 ft 2 in (1.88 m)	180 lb (82 kg)	So	Huntington Prep School; George Washington	Washington, D.C.
G	4	Sebastian Thomas	6 ft 1 in (1.85 m)	180 lb (82 kg)	So	Bishop Hendricken	Providence, RI
G	5	Jalen Carey	6 ft 3 in (1.91 m)	186 lb (84 kg)	RS Jr	Immaculate Conception (NJ); Syracuse	Harlem, NY
G	10	Ishmael Leggett	6 ft 2 in (1.88 m)	180 lb (82 kg)	RS So	St. John's College	Washington, D.C.
C	11	Jeremy Foumena	6 ft 11 in (2.11 m)	235 lb (107 kg)	Fr	Orangeville Prep	Montreal, QC
G	12	Malik Martin	6 ft 6 in (1.98 m)	210 lb (95 kg)	RS Sr	Curtis; Charlotte	Staten Island, NY
F	15	Rory Stewart	6 ft 8 in (2.03 m)	230 lb (104 kg)	Fr	Orangeville Prep	Toronto, ON
G/F	20	Brandon Weston (redshirt)	6 ft 5 in (1.96 m)	200 lb (91 kg)	So	Hillcrest Prep Academy; Seton Hall	Brooklyn, NY
F	21	Josaphat Bilau	6 ft 10 in (2.08 m)	232 lb (105 kg)	RS So	Spire Academy; New Mexico JC	La Roche-sur-Yon, France
F	22	Alex Tchikou	6 ft 11 in (2.11 m)	230 lb (104 kg)	RS So	Dream City Christian HS; Alabama	Paris, France
G/F	24	Louis Hutchinson	6 ft 7 in (2.01 m)	185 lb (84 kg)	Fr	Long Island Luteran	Upper Marlboro, MD
G	31	Jimmy Ball (W)	6 ft 2 in (1.88 m)	175 lb (79 kg)	Fr	Arlington Catholic	Medford, MA

Head coach

- Archie Miller (NC State)

Assistant coach(es)

- Kenny Johnson (Maryland)
- Duane Woodward (Boston College)
- Austin Carroll (American)

Legend

- (C) Team captain
- (S) Suspended
- (I) Ineligible
- (W) Walk-on
- Injured
- Current redshirt

Roster
Last update: 2024-03-21

== Schedule and results ==
Date time, TV	Rank^{#}	Opponent^{#}	Result	Record	High points	High rebounds	High assists	Site (attendance) city, state
Non-conference regular season
November 7, 2022*; 7:00 p.m., ESPN+		Quinnipiac	L 62–67	0–1	14 – Leggett	8 – Martin	6 – Thomas	Ryan Center (5,501); Kingston, RI
November 12, 2022*; 4:00 p.m., ESPN+		Texas State	L 66–70	0–2	21 – Leggett	8 – Tchikou	4 – Leggett	Ryan Center (4,610); Kingston, RI
November 15, 2022*; 7:00 p.m., ESPN+		Stony Brook	W 74–64	1–2	18 – Leggett	9 – Leggett	10 – Thomas	Ryan Center (4,484); Kingston, RI
November 21, 2022*; 7:30 p.m., FloSports		vs. Kansas State; Cayman Islands Classic quarterfinals	L 57–77	1–3	13 – Leggett	10 – Weston	2 – Tied	John Gray Gymnasium (1,250); George Town, Cayman Islands
November 22, 2022*; 5:00 p.m., FloSports		vs. Tulane; Cayman Islands Classic consolation 2nd round	L 75–78	1–4	34 – Leggett	10 – Martin	4 – Tied	John Gray Gymnasium; George Town, Cayman Islands
November 23, 2022*; 11:00 a.m., FloSports		vs. Illinois State; Cayman Islands Classic 7th-place game	W 57–44	2–4	21 – Freeman	11 – Bilau	2 – Leggett	John Gray Gymnasium; George Town, Cayman Islands
November 27, 2022*; 12:00 p.m., ACCN		at Boston College	L 49–53	2–5	21 – Freeman	8 – Martin	3 – Leggett	Conte Forum (4,432); Chestnut Hill, MA
December 3, 2022*; 5:00 p.m., ESPNU		Providence; Ocean State Rivalry	L 74–88	2–6	16 – Bilau	5 – Bilau	5 – Thomas	Ryan Center (7,662); Kingston, RI
December 7, 2022*; 7:00 p.m., ESPN+		Brown	L 58–59	2–7	14 – Tied	7 – Tied	4 – Freeman	Ryan Center (4,476); Kingstown, RI
December 10, 2022*; 2:00 p.m., ESPN+		Army	W 77–67	3–7	16 – Leggett	12 – Martin	6 – Freeman	Ryan Center (5,238); Kingston, RI
December 13, 2022*; 7:00 p.m., ESPN+		UMass Lowell	W 77–75 ^{OT}	4–7	19 – Leggett	10 – Samb	3 – Thomas	Ryan Center (3,829); Kingston, RI
December 18, 2022*; 2:00 p.m., ESPN+		at Georgia State	L 66–75	4–8	21 – Freeman	5 – Tied	4 – Tied	GSU Convocation Center (1,440); Atlanta, GA
December 22, 2022*; 7:00 p.m., ESPN+		Milwaukee	Cancelled due to COVID-19 outbreak within the Rhode Island program					Ryan Center; Kingston, RI
Atlantic 10 regular season
December 31, 2022; 1:00 p.m., ESPN+		at Duquesne	L 61–72	4–9 (0–1)	15 – Carey	11 – Martin	3 – Tied	UPMC Cooper Fieldhouse (2,887); Pittsburgh, PA
January 4, 2023; 7:00 p.m., ESPN+		Fordham	W 82–79	5–9 (1–1)	23 – Martin	7 – Thomas	8 – Freeman	Ryan Center (3,683); Kingston, RI
January 7, 2023; 2:00 p.m., ESPN+		at La Salle	L 75–77 ^{OT}	5–10 (1–2)	18 – Tied	11 – Tied	4 – Tied	Tom Gola Arena (1,571); Philadelphia, PA
January 11, 2023; 7:00 p.m., ESPN+		St. Bonaventure	W 68–67	6–10 (2–2)	23 – Leggett	14 – Leggett	5 – Freeman	Ryan Center (4,722); Kingston, RI
January 14, 2023; 4:30 p.m., ESPN+		at UMass	L 65–75	6–11 (2–3)	19 – Leggett	7 – Tied	3 – Tied	Mullins Center (5,013); Amherst, MA
January 17, 2023; 7:00 p.m., ESPN+		at Richmond	L 57–64	6–12 (2–4)	18 – Freeman	6 – Carey	5 – Freeman	Robins Center (5,892); Richmond, VA
January 21, 2023; 12:00 p.m., ESPN+		George Mason	L 72–79	6–13 (2–5)	25 – Freeman	6 – Leggett	2 – Carey	Ryan Center (5,917); Kingston, RI
January 25, 2023; 7:00 p.m., CBSSN		Dayton	W 75–70	7–13 (3–5)	25 – Leggett	8 – Carey	3 – Leggett	Ryan Center (5,743); Kingston, RI
January 28, 2023; 2:00 p.m., ESPN+		La Salle	W 72–70	8–13 (4–5)	20 – Leggett	7 – Martin	4 – Leggett	Ryan Center (6,530); Kingston, RI
February 1, 2023; 7:00 p.m., ESPN+		at Saint Joseph's	L 50–64	8–14 (4–6)	14 – Freeman	13 – Martin	4 – Martin	Hagan Arena (1,121); Philadelphia, PA
February 7, 2023; 9:00 p.m., CBSSN		at Saint Louis	L 71–76	8–15 (4–7)	20 – Leggett	8 – Tchikou	4 – Freeman	Chaifetz Arena (5.012); St. Louis, MO
February 11, 2023; 2:00 p.m., ESPN+		at George Mason	L 67–75	8–16 (4–8)	21 – Carey	8 – Carey	2 – Freeman	EagleBank Arena (3,962); Fairfax, VA
February 15, 2023; 7:00 p.m., ESPN+		VCU	L 54–55	8–17 (4–9)	21 – Leggett	9 – Martin	3 – Tied	Ryan Center (4,229); Kingston, RI
February 18, 2023; 2:00 p.m., ESPNU		UMass	L 45–69	8–18 (4–10)	18 – Leggett	8 – Leggett	4 – Thomas	Ryan Center (5,785); Kingston, RI
February 22, 2023; 7:00 p.m., ESPN+		George Washington	L 80–89 ^{OT}	8–19 (4–11)	30 – Leggett	8 – Martin	6 – Thomas	Ryan Center (4,579); Kingston, RI
February 25, 2023; 2:30 p.m., USA		at Fordham	L 71–74	8–20 (4–12)	17 – Martin	8 – Martin	4 – Thomas	Rose Hill Gymnasium (1,808); The Bronx, NY
March 1, 2023; 9:00 p.m., CBSSN		at Loyola Chicago	W 79–77	9–20 (5–12)	20 – Leggett	7 – Leggett	5 – Thomas	Joseph J. Gentile Arena (3,003); Chicago, IL
March 4, 2023; 8:00 p.m., CBSSN		Davidson	L 54–68	9–21 (5–13)	14 – Leggett	8 – Stewart	3 – Leggett	Ryan Center (5,543); Kingston, RI
A-10 tournament
March 7, 2023; 4:30 p.m., ESPN+	(14)	vs. (11) La Salle; First round	L 56–73	9–22	19 – Martin	7 – Martin	4 – Thomas	Barclays Center; Brooklyn, NY
*Non-conference game. ^{#}Rankings from AP poll. (#) Tournament seedings in parentheses. All times are in Eastern Time.
