= 2022–23 George Washington Colonials men's basketball team =

American college basketball season

2022–23 George Washington Colonials men's basketball
- Conference: Atlantic 10 Conference
- Record: 16–16 (10–8 A–10)
- Head coach: Chris Caputo (1st season)
- Assistant coaches: Brenden Straughn; Dwayne Lee; Zak Boisvert
- Home arena: Charles E. Smith Center

2022–23 Atlantic 10 men's basketball standings
	Conf.				Overall
Team	W		L	PCT	W		L	PCT
VCU †	15	–	3	.833	27	–	8	.771
Fordham	12	–	6	.667	25	–	8	.758
Dayton	12	–	6	.667	22	–	12	.647
Saint Louis	12	–	6	.667	21	–	12	.636
George Mason	11	–	7	.611	20	–	13	.606
Duquesne	10	–	8	.556	20	–	13	.606
George Washington	10	–	8	.556	16	–	16	.500
Davidson	8	–	10	.444	16	–	16	.500
Saint Joseph's	8	–	10	.444	16	–	17	.485
St. Bonaventure	8	–	10	.444	14	–	18	.438
Richmond	7	–	11	.389	15	–	18	.455
La Salle	7	–	11	.389	15	–	19	.441
Massachusetts	6	–	12	.333	15	–	16	.484
Rhode Island	5	–	13	.278	9	–	22	.290
Loyola Chicago	4	–	14	.222	10	–	21	.323
† 2023 A10 tournament winner

The 2022–23 George Washington Colonials men's basketball team represented George Washington University during the 2022–23 NCAA Division I men's basketball season. The team was led by first-year head coach Chris Caputo, and played their home games at Charles E. Smith Center in Washington, D.C. as a member of the Atlantic 10 Conference.

The season marked the last for the school using the nickname Colonials. On May 24, 2023, the school changed the nickname to Revolutionaries.

== Previous season ==
The Colonials finished the 2021–22 season with a 12–19 record and a 8–9 record in Atlantic 10 play. They defeated Fordham in the first round of the 2021 Atlantic 10 men's basketball tournament before losing to George Mason.

== Offseason ==
=== Departures ===
Name	Number	Pos.	Height	Weight	Year	Hometown	Reason for departure
Joe Bamisile	1	G	6'4"	195	Sophomore	Chesterfield, VA	Transferred to Oklahoma
Brayon Freeman	2	G	6'2"	180	Freshman	Washington, D.C.	Transferred to Rhode Island
Bryan Knapp	12	G	6'1"	190	Senior	Washington, D.C.	Graduated
Ira Lee	14	F	6'8"	240	RS Senior	Los Angeles, CA	Graduated
Tyler Warner	22	F	6'10"	250	Freshman	Rochester, NY	Walk-on; left the team for personal reasons
Miles Gally	33	F	6'9"	220	Junior	Rockville, MD	Left team for personal reasons

=== Incoming transfers ===
Name	Number	Pos.	Height	Weight	Year	Hometown	Previous school
E.J. Clark	1	G	5'11"	165	GS Senior	Dallas, TX	Alabama State
Maximus Edwards	2	G	6'5"	220	Sophomore	Stratford, CT	Kansas State
Keegan Harvey	14	F	6'11"	220	Junior	Newcastle, Australia	College of Charleston

=== Recruiting classes ===
==== 2022 recruiting class ====
College recruiting information
Name	Hometown	School	Height	Weight	Commit date
Jabari West; PG	Hot Springs, AR	Hot Springs High School	6 ft 1 in (1.85 m)	160 lb (73 kg)	Sep 7, 2021
Jabari West; PG	Recruit ratings: Scout: Rivals: 247Sports: ESPN: (0)				
Overall recruit ranking:
Note: In many cases, Scout, Rivals, 247Sports, On3, and ESPN may conflict in their listings of height and weight.; In these cases, the average was taken. ESPN grades are on a 100-point scale.; Sources: "2022 Team Ranking". Rivals.

==== 2023 recruiting class ====
College recruiting information (2023)
Name	Hometown	School	Height	Weight	Commit date
Jacoi Hutchinson #58 PG	Bradenton, FL	IMG Academy	6 ft 1 in (1.85 m)	165 lb (75 kg)	Oct 31, 2022
Jacoi Hutchinson #58 PG	Recruit ratings: Scout: Rivals: 247Sports: ESPN: (79)				
Christian Jones; SG	The Bronx, NY	Our Saviour Lutheran School	6 ft 4 in (1.93 m)	170 lb (77 kg)	Oct 22, 2022
Christian Jones; SG	Recruit ratings: Scout: Rivals: 247Sports: ESPN: (NR)				
Trey Autry; SG	Hudson, OH	Western Reserve Academy	6 ft 3 in (1.91 m)	180 lb (82 kg)	Oct 17, 2022
Trey Autry; SG	Recruit ratings: Scout: Rivals: 247Sports: ESPN: (NR)				
Overall recruit ranking:
Note: In many cases, Scout, Rivals, 247Sports, On3, and ESPN may conflict in their listings of height and weight.; In these cases, the average was taken. ESPN grades are on a 100-point scale.; Sources: "2023 Team Ranking". Rivals.

== Roster ==
2022–23 George Washington Colonials men's basketball team
Players
Coaches

Pos.	#	Name	Height	Weight	Year	Previous school	Hometown
G	0	Laziz Talipov (W)	6 ft 1 in (1.85 m)	160 lb (73 kg)	So	Trinity Preparatory School	Orlando, FL
G	1	E.J. Clark	5 ft 11 in (1.8 m)	165 lb (75 kg)	GS	Alabama State	Dallas, TX
G	2	Maximus Edwards	6 ft 5 in (1.96 m)	215 lb (98 kg)	RS Fr	Kansas State	Stratford, CT
G	3	Amir Harris	6 ft 5 in (1.96 m)	210 lb (95 kg)	GS	Nebraska	Frederick, MD
F	4	Ricky Jr. Lindo	6 ft 8 in (2.03 m)	220 lb (100 kg)	RS Sr	Maryland	Washington, D.C.
F	5	Jabari Jr. West	6 ft 8 in (2.03 m)	230 lb (104 kg)	Fr	Hot Springs High School	Hot Springs, AR
G	10	Brendan Adams	6 ft 4 in (1.93 m)	205 lb (93 kg)	GS	UConn	Baltimore, MD
G	11	James IV Bishop	6 ft 2 in (1.88 m)	185 lb (84 kg)	Sr	LSU	Baltimore, MD
F	13	Hunter Dean	6 ft 10 in (2.08 m)	235 lb (107 kg)	Sr	Southern Miss	Mandeville, LA
F	14	Keegan Harvey	6 ft 11 in (2.11 m)	220 lb (100 kg)	Jr	College of Charleston	Newcastle, Australia
F	20	Qwanzi Samuels	6 ft 9 in (2.06 m)	205 lb (93 kg)	Sr	Florida Gulf Coast	District Heights, MD
C	21	Noel Brown	6 ft 11 in (2.11 m)	260 lb (118 kg)	Jr	Flint Hill School	Leesburg, VA
F	23	Daniel Nixon	6 ft 7 in (2.01 m)	225 lb (102 kg)	So	Winston Salem Christian School	White Plains, NY
G	34	Theofanis Stamoulis (W)	6 ft 3 in (1.91 m)	175 lb (79 kg)	GS	Adelphi	Athens, Greece

Head coach

- Chris Caputo (Westfield State)

Assistant coach(es)

- Brenden Straughn (Hood)
- Dwayne Lee (Saint Joseph's)
- Zak Boisvert (Fordham)

Legend

- (C) Team captain
- (S) Suspended
- (I) Ineligible
- (W) Walk-on
- Injured
- Current redshirt

Roster
Last update: August 2, 2024

== Schedule and results ==
Date time, TV	Rank^{#}	Opponent^{#}	Result	Record	High points	High rebounds	High assists	Site (attendance) city, state
Exhibition
October 30, 2022*; 2:00 p.m.		Western Connecticut State	W 78–61		19 – Bishop IV	9 – Edwards	6 – Bishop IV	Charles E. Smith Center (480); Washington, D.C.
Non-conference regular season
November 7, 2022*; 7:00 p.m., ESPN+		Virginia State	W 85–58	1–0	21 – Bishop IV	10 – Lindo Jr.	9 – Bishop IV	Charles E. Smith Center (1,711); Washington, D.C.
November 11, 2022*; 6:00 p.m., ESPN+		Howard	W 85–75	2–0	19 – Lindo Jr.	9 – tied	5 – Bishop IV	Charles E. Smith Center (2,363); Washington, D.C.
November 14, 2022*; 7:00 p.m., FloSports		at Hofstra	L 80–85	2–1	44 – Bishop IV	10 – Lindo Jr.	5 – Bishop IV	Mack Sports Complex (1,898); Hempstead, NY
November 18, 2022*; 7:00 p.m., ESPN+		Maryland Eastern Shore	W 69–64	3–1	19 – Bishop IV	8 – Lindo Jr.	6 – Adams	Charles E. Smith Center (1,147); Washington, D.C.
November 22, 2022*; 7:00 p.m., ESPN+		UC San Diego	L 70–75	3–2	25 – Bishop IV	7 – Dean	4 – Bishop IV	Charles E. Smith Center (841); Washington, D.C.
November 26, 2022*; 2:00 p.m., NBCSWA/ESPN+		New Hampshire	W 75–54	4–2	25 – Adams	9 – Lindo Jr.	5 – Bishop IV	Charles E. Smith Center (703); Washington, D.C.
November 30, 2022*; 9:00 p.m., CBSSN		South Carolina	W 79–55	5–2	24 – Bishop IV	8 – Edwards	8 – Bishop IV	Charles E. Smith Center (2,216); Washington, D.C.
December 4, 2022*; 2:00 p.m., ESPN+		at Radford	L 76–86	5–3	26 – Bishop IV	5 – Dean	5 – Bishop IV	Dedmon Center (1,246); Radford, VA
December 10, 2022*; 4:00 p.m., ESPN+		American	L 64–69	5–4	18 – Lindo Jr.	9 – Lindo Jr.	7 – Bishop IV	Charles E. Smith Center (1,619); Washington, D.C.
December 13, 2022*; 6:00 p.m., ESPN+		Coppin State	W 83–71	6–4	30 – Bishop IV	12 – Edwards	5 – Edwards	Charles E. Smith Center (808); Washington, D.C.
December 22, 2022*; 9:00 p.m., ESPN2		vs. Washington State; Diamond Head Classic quarterfinals	L 64–66	6–5	17 – Adams	8 – Edwards	5 – Bishop IV	Stan Sheriff Center; Honolulu, HI
December 23, 2022*; 10:00 p.m., ESPN2		vs. Pepperdine; Diamond Head Classic	L 70–81	6–6	22 – Bishop IV	8 – Lindo Jr.	3 – Bishop IV	Stan Sheriff Center; Honolulu, HI
December 25, 2022*; 1:30 p.m., ESPNU		vs. Seattle; Diamond Head Classic 7th-place game	L 67–85	6–7	19 – Adams	4 – Brown	3 – Bishop IV	Stan Sheriff Center; Honolulu, HI
Atlantic 10 regular season
December 31, 2022; 4:00 p.m., ESPN+		at Loyola Chicago	W 97–87	7–7 (1–0)	40 – Bishop IV	7 – Dean	7 – Bishop IV	Joseph J. Gentile Arena (2,424); Chicago, IL
January 4, 2023; 7:00 p.m., ESPN+		at Richmond	L 63–73	7–8 (1–1)	25 – Bishop IV	9 – Edwards	5 – Bishop IV	Robins Center (5,394); Richmond, VA
January 7, 2023; 2:00 p.m., USA		UMass	W 81–73	8–8 (2–1)	26 – Bishop IV	13 – Dean	5 – tied	Charles E. Smith Center (1,102); Washington, D.C.
January 14, 2023; 4:00 p.m., NBCSWA/ESPN+		Saint Louis	L 74–81	8–9 (2–2)	24 – Edwards	9 – Lindo Jr.	5 – Bishop IV	Charles E. Smith Center (1,706); Washington, D.C.
January 16, 2023; 4:00 p.m., CBSSN		at George Mason; Revolutionary Rivalry	W 78–75	9–9 (3–2)	22 – Adams	8 – Adams	8 – Bishop IV	EagleBank Arena (3,906); Fairfax, VA
January 21, 2023; 12:30 p.m., USA		Dayton	W 76–69	10–9 (4–2)	27 – Bishop IV	8 – Adams	7 – Bishop IV	Charles E. Smith Center (2,380); Washington, D.C.
January 25, 2023; 7:00 p.m., ESPN+		Saint Joseph's	W 92–91	11–9 (5–2)	32 – Adams	10 – Edwards	6 – Bishop IV	Charles E. Smith Center (1,254); Washington, D.C.
January 28, 2023; 2:00 p.m., ESPN+		at Fordham	L 70–85	11–10 (5–3)	18 – Adams	10 – Lindo Jr.	6 – Bishop IV	Rose Hill Gymnasium (1,734); The Bronx, NY
February 1, 2023; 7:00 p.m., ESPN+		at La Salle	L 64–75	11–11 (5–4)	14 – tied	9 – Lindo Jr.	3 – Edwards	Tom Gola Arena (1,176); Philadelphia, PA
February 4, 2023; 2:00 p.m., NBCSWA/ESPN+		Duquesne	L 67-93	11-12 (5-5)	15 – Edwards	9 – Lindo Jr.	3 – Bishop IV	Charles E. Smith Center (1,877); Washington, D.C.
February 8, 2023; 7:00 p.m., ESPN+		Richmond	W 107–105 ^{2OT}	12–12 (6–5)	35 – Adams	16 – Edwards	10 – Bishop IV	Charles E. Smith Center (1,067); Washington, D.C.
February 11, 2023; 1:00 p.m.		at Saint Joseph's	L 69–81	12–13 (6–6)	15 – Adams	8 – Edwards	4 – Adams	Hagan Arena (1,843); Philadelphia, PA
February 15, 2023; 7:00 p.m., NBCSWA/ESPN+		George Mason; Revolutionary Rivalry	L 53–66	12–14 (6–7)	23 – Bishop IV	5 – tied	3 – Edwards	Charles E. Smith Center (1,377); Washington, D.C.
February 19, 2023; 2:00 p.m., USA		at St. Bonaventure	W 83-81 ^{OT}	13–14 (7–7)	28 – Adams	15 – Edwards	6 – Bishop IV	Reilly Center (4,760); Olean, NY
February 22, 2023; 7:00 p.m., ESPN+		at Rhode Island	W 89–80 ^{OT}	14–14 (8–7)	25 – Bishop IV	12 – Dean	6 – Bishop IV	Ryan Center (4,579); Kingston, RI
February 25, 2023; 6:00 p.m., ESPN+		La Salle	W 92–85	15–14 (9–7)	29 – Bishop IV	11 – Lindo Jr.	9 – Bishop IV	Charles E. Smith Center (1,457); Washington, D.C.
March 1, 2023; 7:00 p.m., ESPN+		at Davidson	W 75–70	16–14 (10–7)	26 – Bishop IV	11 – Lindo Jr.	4 – Bishop IV	John M. Belk Arena (3,590); Davidson, NC
March 4, 2023; 4:30 p.m., USA		VCU	L 68–74	16–15 (10–8)	14 – Dean	10 – Edwards	6 – Adams	Charles E. Smith Center (3,712); Washington, D.C.
Atlantic 10 tournament
March 8, 2023; 5:00 p.m., USA	(7)	vs. (10) Saint Joseph's; Second round	L 76–87	16–16	25 – Bishop IV	12 – Dean	8 – Bishop IV	Barclays Center; Brooklyn, NY
*Non-conference game. ^{#}Rankings from AP poll. (#) Tournament seedings in parentheses. All times are in Eastern.
