= 2022–23 UMass Minutemen basketball team =

Basketball team

2022–23 UMass Minutemen basketball

Myrtle Beach Invitational champions
- Conference: Atlantic 10 Conference
- Record: 15–16 (6–12 A–10)
- Head coach: Frank Martin (1st season)
- Associate head coach: Allen Edwards
- Assistant coaches: Brian Steele; Derek Kellogg
- Home arena: Mullins Center

2022–23 Atlantic 10 men's basketball standings
	Conf.				Overall
Team	W		L	PCT	W		L	PCT
VCU †	15	–	3	.833	27	–	8	.771
Fordham	12	–	6	.667	25	–	8	.758
Dayton	12	–	6	.667	22	–	12	.647
Saint Louis	12	–	6	.667	21	–	12	.636
George Mason	11	–	7	.611	20	–	13	.606
Duquesne	10	–	8	.556	20	–	13	.606
George Washington	10	–	8	.556	16	–	16	.500
Davidson	8	–	10	.444	16	–	16	.500
Saint Joseph's	8	–	10	.444	16	–	17	.485
St. Bonaventure	8	–	10	.444	14	–	18	.438
Richmond	7	–	11	.389	15	–	18	.455
La Salle	7	–	11	.389	15	–	19	.441
Massachusetts	6	–	12	.333	15	–	16	.484
Rhode Island	5	–	13	.278	9	–	22	.290
Loyola Chicago	4	–	14	.222	10	–	21	.323
† 2023 A10 tournament winner

The 2022–23 UMass Minutemen basketball team represented the University of Massachusetts Amherst during the 2022–23 NCAA Division I men's basketball season. The Minutemen are led by first-year head coach Frank Martin and play their home games at the William D. Mullins Memorial Center in Amherst, Massachusetts as members of the Atlantic 10 Conference.

== Previous season ==
The Minutemen finished the 2021–22 season 15–17, 7–11 in A-10 play to finish in 10th place. They defeated George Washington in the second round of the A-10 tournament before losing to Dayton in the quarterfinals.

== Offseason ==
=== Departures ===
Name	Number	Pos.	Height	Weight	Year	Hometown	Reason for departure
Trent Buttrick	0	F	6'8"	240	RS Senior	Bloomsburg, PA	Graduated
Javohn Garcia	1	G	6'2"	180	Sophomore	Pickerington, OH	Transferred to College of the Sequoias
Preston Santos	2	G/F	6'6"	185	Junior	Providence, RI	Transferred to Southern New Hampshire
Kolton Mitchell	3	G	6'3"	185	Junior	Fort Myers, FL	Transferred to West Virginia
Cairo McCrory	5	G	6'5"	190	Freshman	Hartford, CT	Left the team for personal reasons
Greg Jones	10	F	6'7"	220	RS Senior	Richmond, VA	Left the team for personal reasons
CJ Kelly	15	G	6'5"	190	Senior	Long Island, NY	Graduate transferred to UCF
Rich Kelly	22	G	6'1"	175	GS Senior	Shelton, CT	Graduated
Michael Steadman	24	F	6'11"	231	RS Senior	Union City, CA	Graduated
Dibaji Walker	35	F	6'9"	200	Senior	Columbus, OH	Graduate transferred to Appalachian State

=== Incoming transfers ===
Name	Number	Pos.	Height	Weight	Year	Hometown	Previous School
Wildens Leveque	0	F/C	6'10"	255	Senior	Brockton, MA	South Carolina
Brandon Martin	1	F	6'5"	232	GS Senior	Miami, FL	South Carolina
Rahsool Diggins	3	G	6'2"	175	Sophomore	Philadelphia, PA	UConn
Jackson Cronin	4	G	6'1"	187	Sophomore	Great Neck, NY	Walk-on; Nebraska
Ta'Quan Woodley	5	F	6'8"	280	Sophomore	Camden, NJ	South Carolina
Isaac Kante	10	F	6'8"	245	GS Senior	Brooklyn, NY	LIU
Gianni Thompson	13	F	6'8"	205	Sophomore	Newton, MA	Boston College
Matt Cross	33	F	6'7"	225	Junior	Beverly, MA	Louisville

=== 2022 recruiting class ===
College recruiting information
Name	Hometown	School	Height	Weight	Commit date
Tafara Gapare #43 PF	South Kent, CT	South Kent School	6 ft 9 in (2.06 m)	205 lb (93 kg)	Aug 10, 2022
Tafara Gapare #43 PF	Recruit ratings: Scout: Rivals: 247Sports: ESPN: (78)				
R.J. Luis; SG	Miami, FL	Mt. Zion Prep	6 ft 6 in (1.98 m)	195 lb (88 kg)	May 23, 2022
R.J. Luis; SG	Recruit ratings: Scout: Rivals: 247Sports: ESPN: (NR)				
Keon Thompson; PG	Merrillville, IN	Merrillville High School	5 ft 11 in (1.80 m)	155 lb (70 kg)	May 8, 2022
Keon Thompson; PG	Recruit ratings: Scout: Rivals: 247Sports: ESPN: (NR)				
Overall recruit ranking:
Note: In many cases, Scout, Rivals, 247Sports, On3, and ESPN may conflict in their listings of height and weight.; In these cases, the average was taken. ESPN grades are on a 100-point scale.; Sources: "2022 Team Ranking". Rivals.

=== 2023 recruiting class ===
College recruiting information (2023)
Name	Hometown	School	Height	Weight	Commit date
Sawyer Mayhugh #49 C	Weston, MA	Brewster Academy	6 ft 10 in (2.08 m)	220 lb (100 kg)	Oct 1, 2022
Sawyer Mayhugh #49 C	Recruit ratings: Scout: Rivals: 247Sports: ESPN: (79)				
Jayden Ndjigue; SF	Weston, MA	The Rivers School	6 ft 4 in (1.93 m)	190 lb (86 kg)	Aug 9, 2022
Jayden Ndjigue; SF	Recruit ratings: Scout: Rivals: 247Sports: ESPN: (NR)				
Robert Davis; SF	Castaic, CA	Southern California Academy	6 ft 6 in (1.98 m)	190 lb (86 kg)	Aug 26, 2022
Robert Davis; SF	Recruit ratings: Scout: Rivals: 247Sports: ESPN: (NR)				
Rollie Castineyra; PG	Exeter, NH	Phillips Exeter Academy	6 ft 1 in (1.85 m)	180 lb (82 kg)	Sep 23, 2022
Rollie Castineyra; PG	Recruit ratings: Scout: Rivals: 247Sports: ESPN: (NR)				
Overall recruit ranking:
Note: In many cases, Scout, Rivals, 247Sports, On3, and ESPN may conflict in their listings of height and weight.; In these cases, the average was taken. ESPN grades are on a 100-point scale.; Sources: "2023 Team Ranking". Rivals.

== Roster ==
2022–23 UMass Minutemen men's basketball team
Players
Coaches

Pos.	#	Name	Height	Weight	Year	Previous school	Hometown
F/C	0	Wildens Leveque	6 ft 10 in (2.08 m)	255 lb (116 kg)	Sr	Gould Academy; South Carolina	Brockton, MA
F	1	Brandon Martin	6 ft 5 in (1.96 m)	223 lb (101 kg)	GS	Cardinal Newman HS; South Carolina	Miami, FL
F	2	Tafara Gapare	6 ft 9 in (2.06 m)	—	Fr	South Kent School	Wellington, New Zealand
G	3	Rahsool Diggins	6 ft 2 in (1.88 m)	185 lb (84 kg)	So	Archbishop Wood HS; UConn	Philadelphia, PA
G	4	Jackson Cronin (W)	6 ft 0 in (1.83 m)	187 lb (85 kg)	So	Great Neck North HS; Nebraska	Great Neck, NY
F	5	Ta'Quan Woodley	6 ft 8 in (2.03 m)	—	So	Camden HS; South Carolina	Camden, NJ
F	10	Isaac Kante	6 ft 7 in (2.01 m)	259 lb (117 kg)	GS	Putnam Science Academy; LIU	Brooklyn, NY
G	11	Noah Fernandes	5 ft 11 in (1.8 m)	180 lb (82 kg)	Sr	Woodstock Academy; Wichita State	Mattapoisett, MA
G	12	RJ Luis	6 ft 7 in (2.01 m)	196 lb (89 kg)	Fr	Mt. Zion Prep	Miami, FL
F	13	Gianni Thompson	6 ft 8 in (2.03 m)	210 lb (95 kg)	So	Brimmer and May; Boston College	Newton, MA
G	20	Ryan Marcus (W)	6 ft 3 in (1.91 m)	185 lb (84 kg)	Jr	Wakefield Memorial HS	Wakefield, MA
G	22	Keon Thompson	6 ft 0 in (1.83 m)	210 lb (95 kg)	Fr	Hargrave Military Academy	Merrillville, IN
G	23	T.J. Weeks Jr.	6 ft 4 in (1.93 m)	190 lb (86 kg)	RS Jr	Bishop Hendricken Catholic HS	Warwick, RI
F	33	Matt Cross	6 ft 7 in (2.01 m)	230 lb (104 kg)	Jr	Brewster Academy; Louisville	Beverly, MA
F	44	John Kelly (W)	6 ft 7 in (2.01 m)	212 lb (96 kg)	RS Jr	Williston Northampton School; Fairfield	Shelton, CT
F	45	Dyondre Dominguez	6 ft 9 in (2.06 m)	200 lb (91 kg)	Jr	Woodstock Academy	Providence, RI

Head coach

- Frank Martin (FIU)

Assistant coach(es)

- Allen Edwards (Kentucky)
- Brian Steele (South Carolina)
- Derek Kellogg (UMass)

Legend

- (C) Team captain
- (S) Suspended
- (I) Ineligible
- (W) Walk-on
- Injured
- Current redshirt

Roster

== Schedule and results ==
Date time, TV	Rank^{#}	Opponent^{#}	Result	Record	Site (attendance) city, state
Exhibition
November 1, 2022*; 7:00 p.m.		American International	W 94–68		Mullins Center; Amherst, MA
Non-conference regular season
November 7, 2022*; 7:30 p.m., NESN+		Central Connecticut	W 74–67	1–0	Mullins Center (4,963); Amherst, MA
November 10, 2022*; 7:00 p.m., NESN+		Towson	L 55–67	1–1	Mullins Center (4,435); Amherst, MA
November 17, 2022*; 1:30 p.m., ESPNU		vs. Colorado; Myrtle Beach Invitational Quarterfinals	W 66–63	2–1	HTC Center (1,256); Conway, SC
November 18, 2022*; 2:30 p.m., ESPN2		vs. Murray State; Myrtle Beach Invitational Semifinals	W 71–69	3–1	HTC Center (1,393); Conway, SC
November 20, 2022*; 1:00 p.m., ESPN2		vs. Charlotte; Myrtle Beach Invitational Championship	W 60–54	4–1	HTC Center (1,349); Conway, SC
November 29, 2022*; 7:00 p.m., ESPN+		at South Florida	W 73–67	5–1	Yuengling Center (2,723); Tampa, FL
December 2, 2022*; 7:00 p.m., ESPN+		at Harvard	W 71–68	6–1	Lavietes Pavilion (1,636); Allston, MA
December 5, 2022*; 7:00 p.m., NESN		Albany	W 87–73	7–1	Mullins Center (3,174); Amherst, MA
December 8, 2022*; 7:00 p.m., NESN		UMass Lowell	L 80–85	7–2	Mullins Center (3,720); Amherst, MA
December 11, 2022*; 3:00 p.m., YES		vs. Hofstra; Hall of Fame Invitational	W 71–56	8–2	Barclays Center; Brooklyn, NY
December 17, 2022*; 3:00 p.m., ESPN+		vs. North Texas; Hall of Fame Classic	L 44–62	8–3	MassMutual Center (3,426); Springfield, MA
December 20, 2022*; 7:00 p.m., NESN		Dartmouth	W 68–57	9–3	Mullins Center (2,232); Amherst, MA
A-10 regular season
December 31, 2022; 2:00 p.m., ESPN+		at St. Bonaventure	L 64–83	9–4 (0–1)	Reilly Center (3,978); Olean, NY
January 4, 2023; 7:30 p.m., NESN		Saint Louis	W 90–81	10–4 (1–1)	Mullins Center (3,449); Amherst, MA
January 7, 2023; 2:00 p.m., USA		at George Washington	L 73–81	10–5 (1–2)	Charles E. Smith Center (1,102); Washington, D.C.
January 11, 2023; 7:00 p.m., NESN		La Salle	L 77–78	10–6 (1–3)	Mullins Center (2,853); Amherst, MA
January 14, 2023; 4:30 p.m., NESN+		Rhode Island	W 75–65	11–6 (2–3)	Mullins Center (5,013); Amherst, MA
January 17, 2023; 7:00 p.m., NBC Digital		at VCU	L 55–83	11–7 (2–4)	Siegel Center (7,225); Richmond, VA
January 21, 2023; 1:00 p.m., ESPN+		at Saint Joseph's	L 68–74	11–8 (2–5)	Hagan Arena (1,611); Philadelphia, PA
January 25, 2023; 7:00 p.m., NESN		Richmond	W 85–76	12–8 (3–5)	Mullins Center (2,143); Amherst, MA
January 28, 2023; 4:00 p.m., NESN+		Duquesne	W 87–79	13–8 (4–5)	Mullins Center (3,810); Amherst, MA
February 1, 2023; 7:00 p.m., ESPN+		at George Mason	L 59–70	13–9 (4–6)	EagleBank Arena (2,805); Fairfax, VA
February 4, 2023; 12:30 p.m., USA		Davidson	L 78–93	13–10 (4–7)	Mullins Center (4,546); Amherst, MA
February 8, 2023; 7:00 p.m., ESPN+		at Fordham	L 67–77	13–11 (4–8)	Rose Hill Gymnasium (1,808); Bronx, NY
February 11, 2023; 2:00 p.m., ESPN+		at La Salle	L 72–86	13–12 (4–9)	Tom Gola Arena (2,019); Philadelphia, PA
February 14, 2023; 7:00 p.m., ESPN+		Loyola Chicago	L 62–64	13–13 (4–10)	Mullins Center (2,670); Amherst, MA
February 18, 2023; 2:00 p.m., ESPNU		at Rhode Island	W 69–45	14–13 (5–10)	Ryan Center; Kingston, RI
February 22, 2023; 7:00 p.m., CBSSN		Dayton	L 54–72	14–14 (5–11)	Mullins Center (3,642); Amherst, MA
March 1, 20223; 7:00 p.m., ESPN+		at Duquesne	L 79–88	14–15 (5–12)	UPMC Cooper Fieldhouse (1,876); Pittsburgh, PA
March 4, 2023; 2:30 p.m., USA		St. Bonaventure	W 71–60	15–15 (6–12)	Mullins Center (3,474); Amherst, MA
A-10 tournament
March 7, 2023; 11:30 a.m., ESPN+	(13)	vs. (12) Richmond; First round	L 38–71	15–16	Barclays Center; Brooklyn, NY
*Non-conference game. ^{#}Rankings from AP Poll / Coaches' Poll. (#) Tournament seedings in parentheses. All times are in Eastern.
