= 2022–23 Duquesne Dukes men's basketball team =

NCAA Division I team

2022–23 Duquesne Dukes men's basketball

CBI, First Round
- Conference: Atlantic 10 Conference
- Record: 20–13 (10–8 A–10)
- Head coach: Keith Dambrot (6th season)
- Associate head coach: Dru Joyce III
- Assistant coaches: Rick McFadden; Charles Thomas; Carl Thomas
- Home arena: UPMC Cooper Fieldhouse

2022–23 Atlantic 10 men's basketball standings
	Conf.				Overall
Team	W		L	PCT	W		L	PCT
VCU †	15	–	3	.833	27	–	8	.771
Fordham	12	–	6	.667	25	–	8	.758
Dayton	12	–	6	.667	22	–	12	.647
Saint Louis	12	–	6	.667	21	–	12	.636
George Mason	11	–	7	.611	20	–	13	.606
Duquesne	10	–	8	.556	20	–	13	.606
George Washington	10	–	8	.556	16	–	16	.500
Davidson	8	–	10	.444	16	–	16	.500
Saint Joseph's	8	–	10	.444	16	–	17	.485
St. Bonaventure	8	–	10	.444	14	–	18	.438
Richmond	7	–	11	.389	15	–	18	.455
La Salle	7	–	11	.389	15	–	19	.441
Massachusetts	6	–	12	.333	15	–	16	.484
Rhode Island	5	–	13	.278	9	–	22	.290
Loyola Chicago	4	–	14	.222	10	–	21	.323
† 2023 A10 tournament winner

The 2022–23 Duquesne Dukes men's basketball team represented Duquesne University during the 2022–23 NCAA Division I men's basketball season. The team was led by sixth-year head coach Keith Dambrot and played their home games at the UPMC Cooper Fieldhouse in Pittsburgh, Pennsylvania as a member of the Atlantic 10 Conference. They finished the season 20–11, 10–8 in A-10 play to finish in a tie for sixth place. They lost to La Salle in the first round of the A-10 tournament. The Dukes were invited to the College Basketball Invitational where they were defeated by Rice in the first round.

== Previous season ==
The Dukes finished the 2021–22 season 6–24, 1–16 in A-10 play to finish in last place. They lost in the first round of the A-10 Tournament to Rhode Island.

== Offseason ==
=== Departures ===
Name	Number	Pos.	Height	Weight	Year	Hometown	Reason for departure
Leon Ayers III	0	G	6'5"	185	Senior	Troy, MI	Graduate transferred to Bowling Green
Tyson Acuff	1	G	6'4"	190	Sophomore	Detroit, MI	Transferred to Eastern Michigan
Toby Okani	2	G	6'7"	195	Sophomore	Orange, NJ	Transferred to UIC
Jackie Johnson III	5	G	5'11"	185	Freshman	Wichita, KS	Transferred to UNLV
Mike Nejelka	22	G	6'2"	185	Sophomore	Solon, OH	Transferred to Kent State
Primo Spears	23	G	6'3"	185	Freshman	Hartford, CT	Transferred to Georgetown
Davis Larson	30	G/F	6'5"	190	GS Senior	Sheboygan, WI	Graduated
Luke Patten	31	F	6'5"	180	Freshman	Butler, PA	No longer on team roster
Noah Buono	33	F	6'6"	175	Senior	Brick Twp, NJ	Walk-on; left the team for personal reasons
Mounir Hima	55	C	6'11"	240	RS Freshman	Tillabéri, Niger	Transferred to Syracuse

=== Incoming transfers ===
Name	Number	Pos.	Height	Weight	Year	Hometown	Previous School
Tevin Brewer	0	G	5'8"	160	GS Senior	Fort Smith, AR	FIU
Tre Clark	1	G	6'3"	185	RS Junior	Covington, GA	Northwest Florida State College
Dae Dae Grant	3	G	6'2	185	Junior	Lorain, OH	Miami (OH)
Joe Reece	20	F	6'8	200	Senior	St. Louis, MO	Bowling Green
Quincy McGriff	55	G	6'6"	200	Sophomore	Los Angeles, CA	Salt Lake Community College

=== 2022 recruiting class ===
College recruiting information
Name	Hometown	School	Height	Weight	Commit date
Kareem Rozier; PG	Detroit, MI	St. Mary's Preparatory	5 ft 9 in (1.75 m)	160 lb (73 kg)	Oct 20, 2021
Kareem Rozier; PG	Recruit ratings: No ratings found				
Devin Carney; CG	Butler, PA	Butler Area High School	6 ft 1 in (1.85 m)	170 lb (77 kg)	Apr 26, 2022
Devin Carney; CG	Recruit ratings: No ratings found				
Matúš Hronský; PF	Poruba, Slovakia	Wasatch Academy	6 ft 8 in (2.03 m)	180 lb (82 kg)	Mar 11, 2022
Matúš Hronský; PF	Recruit ratings: 247Sports:				
David Dixon; SF	Memphis, TN	Memphis Academy of Health Sciences	6 ft 6 in (1.98 m)	180 lb (82 kg)	Mar 10, 2022
David Dixon; SF	Recruit ratings: Rivals:				
Abdou-Halil Barre; SF	Scotland, PA	Scotland Campus	6 ft 8 in (2.03 m)	220 lb (100 kg)	Apr 13, 2022
Abdou-Halil Barre; SF	Recruit ratings: No ratings found				
Overall recruit ranking:
Note: In many cases, Scout, Rivals, 247Sports, On3, and ESPN may conflict in their listings of height and weight.; In these cases, the average was taken. ESPN grades are on a 100-point scale.; Sources: "2022 Team Ranking". Rivals.

== Roster ==
2022–23 Duquesne Dukes men's basketball team
Players
Coaches

Pos.	#	Name	Height	Weight	Year	Previous school	Hometown
G	0	Tevin Brewer	5 ft 8 in (1.73 m)	160 lb (73 kg)	GS	Northside HS; FIU	Fort Smith, AR
G	1	Jimmy Clark III	6 ft 3 in (1.91 m)	185 lb (84 kg)	RS Jr	Newton HS; Northwest Florida State College	Covington, GA
F	2	David Dixon	6 ft 9 in (2.06 m)	215 lb (98 kg)	Fr	Speights Academy (FL)	Memphis, TN
G	3	Dae Dae Grant	6 ft 2 in (1.88 m)	185 lb (84 kg)	Jr	Lorain HS; Miami (OH)	Lorain, OH
C	4	Tre Williams	6 ft 7 in (2.01 m)	250 lb (113 kg)	RS Jr	Woodstock Academy; Indiana State	Reynoldsburg, OH
F	5	Halil Barre	6 ft 9 in (2.06 m)	220 lb (100 kg)	Fr	Scotland Campus (PA)	Cotonou, Benin
F	14	Matúš Hronský	6 ft 8 in (2.03 m)	205 lb (93 kg)	Fr	Wasatch Academy (UT)	Poruba, Slovakia
F	20	Joe Reece	6 ft 8 in (2.03 m)	200 lb (91 kg)	Sr	East St. Louis HS; Bowling Green	St. Louis, MO
F	21	Rodney Gunn Jr.	6 ft 7 in (2.01 m)	230 lb (104 kg)	GS	Irmo; Lenoir–Rhyne	Columbia, SC
F	22	Andy Barba	6 ft 6 in (1.98 m)	200 lb (91 kg)	So	International Sports Academy	Cleveland, OH
F	23	Devin Carney	6 ft 1 in (1.85 m)	180 lb (82 kg)	Fr	Butler Area Sr. HS	Butler, PA
G	25	Jaylen Cole-Williams (W)	6 ft 1 in (1.85 m)	175 lb (79 kg)	RS So	TLAP Sports Academy	Reston, VA
G	30	Jake Harper (W)	6 ft 3 in (1.91 m)	180 lb (82 kg)	Jr	Avonworth HS	Dayton, OH
G	32	Kareem Rozier	5 ft 9 in (1.75 m)	160 lb (73 kg)	Fr	St. Mary's Prep	Detroit, MI
F	34	Austin Rotroff	6 ft 10 in (2.08 m)	240 lb (109 kg)	GS	Wauseon	Wauseon, OH
F	35	Kevin Easley Jr.	6 ft 7 in (2.01 m)	230 lb (104 kg)	RS Jr	Lawrence North; TCU	Indianapolis, IN
G	55	Quincy McGriff	6 ft 6 in (1.98 m)	200 lb (91 kg)	So	Santa Monica HS; Salt Lake CC	Los Angeles, CA

Head coach

- Keith Dambrot (Akron)

Assistant coach(es)

- Dru Joyce III (Akron)
- Rick McFadden (Akron)
- Charles Thomas (Eastern Michigan)
- Carl Thomas (Eastern Michigan)

Legend

- (C) Team captain
- (S) Suspended
- (I) Ineligible
- (W) Walk-on
- Injured
- Current redshirt

Roster

== Schedule and results ==
Date time, TV	Rank^{#}	Opponent^{#}	Result	Record	Site (attendance) city, state
Non-conference regular season
November 8, 2022*; 7:00 p.m., ESPN+		Montana	W 91–63	1–0	UPMC Cooper Fieldhouse (2,157); Pittsburgh, PA
November 11, 2022*; 7:00 p.m., SECN		at No. 4 Kentucky; Tribute Classic	L 52–77	1–1	Rupp Arena (20,014); Lexington, KY
November 14, 2022*; 7:00 p.m., CBSSN		South Carolina State; Tribute Classic	W 96–71	2–1	UPMC Cooper Fieldhouse (2,186); Pittsburgh, PA
November 18, 2022*; 6:00 p.m.		vs. Colgate	W 85–80	3–1	LeBron James Arena (429); Akron, OH
November 21, 2022*; 7:00 p.m.		North Florida; Tribute Classic	W 83–82	4–1	UPMC Cooper Fieldhouse (2,018); Pittsburgh, PA
November 23, 2022*; 7:00 p.m., ESPN+		Alabama State	W 75–57	5–1	UPMC Cooper Fieldhouse (1,784); Pittsburgh, PA
November 29, 2022*; 7:00 p.m., ESPN+		UC Santa Barbara	W 72–61	6–1	UPMC Cooper Fieldhouse (1,863); Pittsburgh, PA
December 3, 2022*; 2:00 p.m., ESPN+		Ball State	W 78–77	7–1	UPMC Cooper Fieldhouse (2,012); Pittsburgh, PA
December 8, 2022*; 7:00 p.m., ESPN+		Marshall	L 71–82	7–2	UPMC Cooper Fieldhouse (1,967); Pittsburgh, PA
December 11, 2022*; 4:00 p.m., ESPN+		New Mexico State	L 60–73	7–3	UPMC Cooper Fieldhouse (1,834); Pittsburgh, PA
December 14, 2022*; 7:00 p.m., ESPN+		DePaul	W 66–55	8–3	UPMC Cooper Fieldhouse (1,873); Pittsburgh, PA
December 17, 2022*; 2:00 p.m., ESPN+		Indiana State	W 92–86	9–3	UPMC Cooper Fieldhouse (2,277); Pittsburgh, PA
December 21, 2022*; 2:00 p.m., ESPN+		Winthrop	W 74–57	10–3	UPMC Cooper Fieldhouse (1,721); Pittsburgh, PA
Atlantic 10 regular season
December 28, 2022; 7:00 p.m., ESPN+		at Dayton	L 57–69	10–4 (0–1)	UD Arena (13,407); Dayton, OH
December 31, 2022; 1:00 p.m., ESPN+		Rhode Island	W 72–61	11–4 (1–1)	UPMC Cooper Fieldhouse (2,887); Pittsburgh, PA
January 4, 2023; 7:00 p.m., ESPN+		VCU	W 79–70	12–4 (2–1)	UPMC Cooper Fieldhouse (2,087); Pittsburgh, PA
January 7, 2023; 6:00 p.m., ESPN+		at Richmond	L 73–75	12–5 (2–2)	Robins Center (7,201); Richmond, VA
January 11, 2023; 7:00 p.m., ESPN+		at Saint Joseph's	W 92–80	13–5 (3–2)	Hagan Arena (1,003); Philadelphia, PA
January 18, 2023; 7:00 p.m., ESPN+		at St. Bonaventure	L 56–65	13–6 (3–3)	Reilly Center (4,107); Olean, NY
January 21, 2023; 2:00 p.m., ESPN+		Fordham	L 58–65	13–7 (3–4)	UPMC Cooper Fieldhouse (2,932); Pittsburgh, PA
January 25, 2023; 7:00 p.m., ESPN+		Loyola Chicago	W 72–58	14–7 (4–4)	UPMC Cooper Fieldhouse (1,964); Pittsburgh, PA
January 28, 2023; 4:00 p.m., ESPN+		at Massachusetts	L 79–87	14–8 (4–5)	Mullins Center (3,810); Amherst, MA
February 4, 2023; 2:00 p.m., ESPN+		at George Washington	W 93–67	15–8 (5–5)	Charles E. Smith Center (1,877); Washington, D.C.
February 8, 2023; 7:00 p.m., ESPN+		George Mason	W 75–52	16–8 (6–5)	UPMC Cooper Fieldhouse (1,927); Pittsburgh, PA
February 11, 2023; 12:30 p.m., USA		St. Bonaventure	W 56–54	17–8 (7–5)	UPMC Cooper Fieldhouse (3,333); Pittsburgh, PA
February 15, 2023; 7:00 p.m., ESPN+		Saint Joseph's	W 76–62	18–8 (8–5)	UPMC Cooper Fieldhouse (1,756); Pittsburgh, PA
February 18, 2023; 8:00 p.m., ESPN+		at Saint Louis	L 85–90	18–9 (8–6)	Chaifetz Arena; St. Louis, MO
February 22, 2023; 7:00 p.m., ESPN+		at La Salle	W 91–74	19–9 (9–6)	Tom Gola Arena (1,473); Philadelphia, PA
February 26, 2023; 2:00 p.m., USA		Davidson	L 67–71	19–10 (9–7)	UPMC Cooper Fieldhouse (3,111); Pittsburgh, PA
March 1, 2023; 7:00 p.m., ESPN+		Massachusetts	W 88–79	20–10 (10–7)	UPMC Cooper Fieldhouse (1,876); Pittsburgh, PA
March 4, 2023; 2:00 p.m., ESPN+		at Fordham	L 60–87	20–11 (10–8)	Rose Hill Gymnasium (1,808); Bronx, NY
A-10 tournament
March 8, 2023; 7:30 p.m., USA Network/Peacock	(6)	vs. (11) La Salle; Second round	L 70–81	20–12	Barclays Center; Brooklyn, NY
College Basketball Invitational
March 19, 2023; 2:30 p.m., FloHoops	(5)	vs. (12) Rice; First round	L 78–84	20–13	Ocean Center; Daytona Beach, FL
*Non-conference game. ^{#}Rankings from AP Poll. (#) Tournament seedings in parentheses. All times are in Eastern Time.
