= 2023 Atlantic 10 men's basketball tournament =

American college competition

- Classification: Division I
- Season: 2022–23
- Teams: 15
- Site: Barclays Center; Brooklyn, New York
- Champions: VCU (2nd title)
- Winning coach: Mike Rhoades (1st title)
- MVP: DaRon Holmes (Dayton)
- Attendance: 46,924
- Television: ESPN+, USA Network/Peacock, CBSSN, CBS/Paramount+

2022–23 Atlantic 10 men's basketball standings
	Conf.				Overall
Team	W		L	PCT	W		L	PCT
VCU †	15	–	3	.833	27	–	8	.771
Fordham	12	–	6	.667	25	–	8	.758
Dayton	12	–	6	.667	22	–	12	.647
Saint Louis	12	–	6	.667	21	–	12	.636
George Mason	11	–	7	.611	20	–	13	.606
Duquesne	10	–	8	.556	20	–	13	.606
George Washington	10	–	8	.556	16	–	16	.500
Davidson	8	–	10	.444	16	–	16	.500
Saint Joseph's	8	–	10	.444	16	–	17	.485
St. Bonaventure	8	–	10	.444	14	–	18	.438
Richmond	7	–	11	.389	15	–	18	.455
La Salle	7	–	11	.389	15	–	19	.441
Massachusetts	6	–	12	.333	15	–	16	.484
Rhode Island	5	–	13	.278	9	–	22	.290
Loyola Chicago	4	–	14	.222	10	–	21	.323
† 2023 A10 tournament winner

The 2023 Atlantic 10 men's basketball tournament is the postseason men's basketball tournament for the 2022–23 season of the Atlantic 10 Conference (A-10). It will be held from March 7–12, 2023, in Brooklyn, New York, at Barclays Center.

== Seeds ==
All 15 A-10 schools will participate in the tournament. Teams will be seeded by winning percentage within the conference, with a tiebreaker system to seed teams with identical percentages. The top 9 teams will receive a first-round bye, and the top 4 teams will receive a double-bye, automatically advancing them to the quarterfinals.

Seed	School	Conference Record	Tiebreaker
1	VCU	15–3	
2	Dayton	12–6	2–1 vs. FOR/SLU
3	Fordham	12–6	1–1 vs. DAY/SLU
4	Saint Louis	12–6	1–2 vs. DAY/FOR
5	George Mason	11–7	
6	Duquesne	10–8	1–0 vs. GW
7	George Washington	10–8	0–1 vs. DUQ
8	Davidson	8–10	2–0 vs. SBU/SJU
9	St. Bonaventure	8–10	1–1 vs. DAV/SJU
10	Saint Joseph's	8–10	0–2 vs. DAV/SBU
11	La Salle	7–11	1–0 vs. UR
12	Richmond	7–11	0–1 vs. LAS
13	Massachusetts	6–12	
14	Rhode Island	5–13	
15	Loyola Chicago	4–14	

== Schedule ==
Session	Game	Time	Matchup	Score	Television	Attendance
First round – Tuesday, March 7
1	1	11:30 am	No. 12 Richmond vs No. 13 Massachusetts	71–38	ESPN+	5,119
1	2	2:00 pm	No. 10 Saint Joseph's vs No. 15 Loyola Chicago	72–67	ESPN+	5,119
1	3	4:30 pm	No. 11 La Salle vs No. 14 Rhode Island	73–56	ESPN+	5,119
Second round – Wednesday, March 8
2	4	11:30 am	No. 8 Davidson vs No. 9 St. Bonaventure	65–54	USA Network	5,011
2	5	2:00 pm	No. 5 George Mason vs No. 12 Richmond	62–57	USA Network	5,011
3	6	5:00 pm	No. 7 George Washington vs No. 10 Saint Joseph's	76–87	USA Network	4,201
3	7	7:30 pm	No. 6 Duquesne vs No. 11 La Salle	70–81	USA Network	4,201
Quarterfinals – Thursday, March 9
4	8	11:30 am	No. 1 VCU vs No. 8 Davidson	71–53	USA Network	5,680
4	9	2:00 pm	No. 4 Saint Louis vs No. 5 George Mason	82–54	USA Network	5,680
5	10	5:00 pm	No. 2 Dayton vs No. 10 Saint Joseph's	60–54	USA Network	8,595
5	11	7:30 pm	No. 3 Fordham vs No. 11 La Salle	69–61	USA Network	8,595
Semifinals – Saturday, March 11
6	12	1:00 pm	No. 1 VCU vs No. 4 Saint Louis	90–78	CBSSN	10,156
6	13	3:30 pm	No. 2 Dayton vs No. 3 Fordham	78–68	CBSSN	10,156
Championship – Sunday, March 12
7	14	1:00 pm	No. 1 VCU vs No. 2 Dayton	68–56	CBS/ Paramount+	8,162

*Game times in Eastern Time.

== Bracket ==
First round Tuesday, March 7 ESPN+
12	Richmond	71
13	Massachusetts	38
10	Saint Joseph's	72
15	Loyola Chicago	67
11	La Salle	73
14	Rhode Island	56

Second round Wednesday, March 8 USA Network/Peacock
8	Davidson	65
9	St. Bonaventure	54
5	George Mason	62
12	Richmond	57
7	George Washington	76
10	Saint Joseph's	87
6	Duquesne	70
11	La Salle	81

Quarterfinals; Thursday, March 9 USA Network/Peacock
1	VCU	71
8	Davidson	53
4	Saint Louis	82
5	George Mason	54
2	Dayton	60
10	Saint Joseph's	54
3	Fordham	69
11	La Salle	61

Semifinals; Saturday, March 11; CBSSN
1	VCU	90
4	Saint Louis	78
2	Dayton	78
3	Fordham	68

Championship; Sunday, March 12; CBS/Paramount+
1	VCU	68
2	Dayton	56
