= 2022–23 Saint Joseph's Hawks men's basketball team =

2022–23 Saint Joseph's Hawks men's basketball
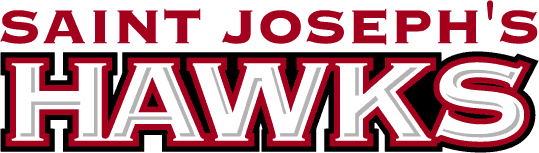
- Conference: Atlantic 10 Conference
- Record: 16–17 (8–10 A–10)
- Head coach: Billy Lange (4th season)
- Associate head coach: John Griffin III
- Assistant coaches: Justin Scott; John Linehan
- Home arena: Hagan Arena

2022–23 Atlantic 10 men's basketball standings
	Conf.				Overall
Team	W		L	PCT	W		L	PCT
VCU †	15	–	3	.833	27	–	8	.771
Fordham	12	–	6	.667	25	–	8	.758
Dayton	12	–	6	.667	22	–	12	.647
Saint Louis	12	–	6	.667	21	–	12	.636
George Mason	11	–	7	.611	20	–	13	.606
Duquesne	10	–	8	.556	20	–	13	.606
George Washington	10	–	8	.556	16	–	16	.500
Davidson	8	–	10	.444	16	–	16	.500
Saint Joseph's	8	–	10	.444	16	–	17	.485
St. Bonaventure	8	–	10	.444	14	–	18	.438
Richmond	7	–	11	.389	15	–	18	.455
La Salle	7	–	11	.389	15	–	19	.441
Massachusetts	6	–	12	.333	15	–	16	.484
Rhode Island	5	–	13	.278	9	–	22	.290
Loyola Chicago	4	–	14	.222	10	–	21	.323
† 2023 A10 tournament winner

The 2022–23 Saint Joseph's Hawks basketball team represented Saint Joseph's University during the 2022–23 NCAA Division I men's basketball season. The Hawks, led by fourth-year head coach Billy Lange, played their home games at Hagan Arena in Philadelphia, Pennsylvania as members of the Atlantic 10 Conference.

== Previous season ==
The Hawks finished the 2021–22 season 11–19, 5–13 in A-10 play to finish 13th place. They lost in the first round of the A-10 Tournament to La Salle.

== Offseason ==
=== Departures ===
Name	Number	Pos.	Height	Weight	Year	Hometown	Reason for departure
Dahmir Bishop	1	G	6'5"	190	Junior	Philadelphia, PA	Transferred to Florida Gulf Coast
Rahmir Moore	11	G	6'3"	205	Junior	Philadelphia, PA	Mid-season transferred to Wagner
Jadrian Tracey	13	F	6'5"	205	Sophomore	Fort Myers, FL	Transferred to Florida SouthWestern State College
Nikkos Luna-Nash	21	G	6'0"	155	Sophomore	Seminole, FL	Walk-on; left the team for personal reasons
Jordan Hall	22	G/F	6'7"	215	Sophomore	Wildwood, NJ	Declare for 2022 NBA draft
Jake Forrest	24	G	6'5"	205	Junior	Bala Cynwyd, PA	Transferred to Bucknell
Taylor Funk	33	F	6'8"	215	RS Senior	Lancaster, PA	Graduate transferred to Utah State

=== Incoming transfers ===
Name	Num	Pos.	Height	Weight	Year	Hometown	Previous School
Lynn Greer III	5	G	6'3"	185	Sophomore	Philadelphia, PA	Dayton
Louis Bleechmore	55	G	6'5"	200	Junior	Sydney, Australia	Harcum College

=== Recruiting classes ===
==== 2022 recruiting class ====
College recruiting information
Name	Hometown	School	Height	Weight	Commit date
Christian Winborne; PG	Baltimore, MD	Gilman High School	6 ft 3 in (1.91 m)	175 lb (79 kg)	Jul 20, 2021
Christian Winborne; PG	Recruit ratings: Scout: Rivals: 247Sports: ESPN: (NR)				
Christ Essandoko; C	Paris, France	Winston-Salem Prep	6 ft 11 in (2.11 m)	260 lb (120 kg)	Apr 24, 2022
Christ Essandoko; C	Recruit ratings: Scout: Rivals: 247Sports: ESPN: (NR)				
Rasheer Fleming; PF	Camden, NJ	Camden High School	6 ft 8 in (2.03 m)	N/A	Jun 28, 2021
Rasheer Fleming; PF	Recruit ratings: Scout: Rivals: 247Sports: ESPN: (NR)				
Quin Berger; PG	Malvern, PA	Westtown School	6 ft 1 in (1.85 m)	200 lb (91 kg)	Mar 21, 2022
Quin Berger; PG	Recruit ratings: Scout: Rivals: 247Sports: ESPN: (NR)				
Overall recruit ranking:
Note: In many cases, Scout, Rivals, 247Sports, On3, and ESPN may conflict in their listings of height and weight.; In these cases, the average was taken. ESPN grades are on a 100-point scale.; Sources: "Saint Joseph's Hawks". ESPN.; "2022 Team Ranking". Rivals.

==== 2023 recruiting class ====
College recruiting information (2023)
Name	Hometown	School	Height	Weight	Commit date
Xzayvier Brown #35 PG	Philadelphia, PA	Roman Catholic High School	6 ft 0 in (1.83 m)	160 lb (73 kg)	Jul 28, 2022
Xzayvier Brown #35 PG	Recruit ratings: Scout: Rivals: 247Sports: ESPN: (80)				
Shawn Simmons #42 PF	Phoenix, AZ	Hillcrest Prep	6 ft 7 in (2.01 m)	185 lb (84 kg)	Aug 20, 2022
Shawn Simmons #42 PF	Recruit ratings: Scout: Rivals: 247Sports: ESPN: (79)				
Anthony Finkley #48 PF	Philadelphia, PA	West Philadelphia Catholic High School	6 ft 7 in (2.01 m)	N/A	Jun 20, 2022
Anthony Finkley #48 PF	Recruit ratings: Scout: Rivals: 247Sports: ESPN: (79)				
Overall recruit ranking:
Note: In many cases, Scout, Rivals, 247Sports, On3, and ESPN may conflict in their listings of height and weight.; In these cases, the average was taken. ESPN grades are on a 100-point scale.; Sources: "Saint Joseph's Hawks". ESPN.; "2023 Team Ranking". Rivals.

== Roster ==
2022–23 Saint Joseph's Hawks men's basketball team
Players
Coaches

Pos.	#	Name	Height	Weight	Year	Previous school	Hometown
G	0	Kacper Klaczek	6 ft 8 in (2.03 m)	230 lb (104 kg)	So	Long Island Lutheran High School	Chorzów, Poland
G	1	Christian Winborne	6 ft 2 in (1.88 m)	185 lb (84 kg)	Fr	Gilman School	Baltimore, Maryland
G	2	Erik Reynolds II	6 ft 2 in (1.88 m)	175 lb (79 kg)	So	Bullis School	Potomac, Maryland
G	3	Cameron Brown	6 ft 5 in (1.96 m)	220 lb (100 kg)	Sr	Eleanor Roosevelt High School	Laurel, Maryland
G	5	Lynn Greer III	6 ft 3 in (1.91 m)	190 lb (86 kg)	So	Dayton	Philadelphia, Pennsylvania
C	10	Anton Jansson	6 ft 11 in (2.11 m)	250 lb (113 kg)	Jr	Golden State Prep	Stockholm, Sweden
G	12	Quin Berger	6 ft 1 in (1.85 m)	200 lb (91 kg)	Fr	Westtown School	Malvern, Pennsylvania
F	13	Rasheer Fleming	6 ft 9 in (2.06 m)	220 lb (100 kg)	Fr	Camden High School	Camden, New Jersey
G	15	Cooper Vogel (W)	6 ft 3 in (1.91 m)	180 lb (82 kg)	Jr	Howell High School	Howell, New Jersey
G	20	Chris Arizin (W)	6 ft 3 in (1.91 m)	195 lb (88 kg)	Jr	St. Joseph's Prep	Media, Pennsylvania
C	22	Christ Essandoko	7 ft 0 in (2.13 m)	285 lb (129 kg)	Fr	Winston Salem Christian School	Paris, France
G	25	Brian Geatens (W)	6 ft 0 in (1.83 m)	175 lb (79 kg)	Jr	St. Joseph's Prep	Harleysville, Pennsylvania
F/C	32	Charles Coleman	7 ft 0 in (2.13 m)	245 lb (111 kg)	RS Jr	East Carolina	Boston, Massachusetts
F/C	50	Ejike Obinna	6 ft 10 in (2.08 m)	245 lb (111 kg)	GS	Vanderbilt	Enugu, Nigeria
F	55	Louis Bleechmore	6 ft 5 in (1.96 m)	200 lb (91 kg)	Jr	Harcum College	Sydney, Australia

Head coach

- Billy Lange (Rowan)

Assistant coach(es)

- John Griffin III (Bucknell)
- Justin Scott (East Stroudsburg)
- John Linehan (Providence)

Legend

- (C) Team captain
- (S) Suspended
- (I) Ineligible
- (W) Walk-on
- Injured
- Current redshirt

Roster

== Schedule and results ==
Date time, TV	Rank^{#}	Opponent^{#}	Result	Record	High points	High rebounds	High assists	Site (attendance) city, state
Exhibition
October 29, 2022*; 1:00 p.m., ESPN+		Towson	W 78–76		22 – Winborne	9 – Klaczek	3 – Tied	Hagan Arena (634); Philadelphia, PA
November 4, 2022*; 7:00 p.m., ESPN+		Widener	W 92–80		22 – Brown	9 – Tied	5 – Winborne	Hagan Arena (753); Philadelphia, PA
Non-conference regular season
November 11, 2022*; 6:00 p.m., CBSSN		vs. No. 3 Houston; Veterans Classic	L 55–81	0–1	17 – Reynolds II	12 – Klaczek	2 – Greer III	Alumni Hall (2,889); Annapolis, MD
November 14, 2022*; 7:00 p.m., ESPN+		Lafayette	W 63–59	1–1	21 – Reynolds II	12 – Brown	5 – Greer III	Hagan Arena (1,296); Philadelphia, PA
November 17, 2022*; 7:00 p.m., ESPN+		Albany; Sunshine Slam campus site game	W 99–79	2–1	32 – Reynolds II	11 – Brown	7 – Greer III	Hagan Arena (1,452); Philadelphia, PA
November 21, 2022*; 8:30 p.m., CBSSN		vs. Georgia; Sunshine Slam semifinals	L 53–66	2–2	10 – Tied	10 – Klaczek	3 – Reynolds II	Ocean Center (1,612); Daytona Beach, FL
November 22, 2022*; 6:30 p.m., FloSports		vs. South Florida; Sunshine Slam consolation game	L 62–75	2–3	15 – Greer III	10 – Fleming	2 – Tied	Ocean Center; Daytona Beach, FL
November 30, 2022*; 8:30 p.m., NBCSP+/ESPN+		at Penn; Philadelphia Big 5	W 85–80 ^{OT}	3–3	27 – Reynolds II	9 – Klaczek	6 – Klaczek	Palestra (3,246); Philadelphia, PA
December 3, 2022*; 1:00 p.m., ESPN+		Fairleigh Dickinson	L 80–97	3–4	21 – Reynolds II	5 – Fleming	4 – Tied	Hagan Arena (1,162); Philadelphia, PA
December 6, 2022*; 7:00 p.m., ESPNU		at Temple; Rivalry	L 60–70	3–5	25 – Brown	10 – Brown	3 – Reynolds II	Liacouras Center (4,402); Philadelphia, PA
December 10, 2022*; 1:00 p.m., ESPN+		Saint Peter's	W 73–57	4–5	17 – Brown	6 – Brown	2 – Tied	Hagan Arena (1,279); Philadelphia, PA
December 17, 2022*; 4:00 p.m., CBSSN		Villanova; Holy War	L 64–71	4–6	27 – Reynolds II	6 – Klaczek	6 – Greer III	Hagan Arena (3,924); Philadelphia, PA
December 19, 2022*; 7:00 p.m., ESPN+		Sacred Heart	W 77–59	5–6	19 – Brown	11 – Brown	8 – Greer III	Hagan Arena (819); Philadelphia, PA
December 22, 2022*; 7:00 p.m., ESPN+		Central Connecticut	W 83–66	6–6	24 – Brown	7 – Obinna	5 – Tied	Hagan Arena (527); Philadelphia, PA
Atlantic 10 regular season
December 31, 2022; 1:00 p.m., ESPN+		Saint Louis	L 78–83	6–7 (0–1)	18 – Reynolds II	9 – Brown	9 – Greer III	Hagan Arena (1,382); Philadelphia, PA
January 4, 2023; 7:00 p.m.		at Dayton	L 56–76	6–8 (0–2)	13 – Brown	5 – Tied	3 – Greer III	UD Arena (13,407); Dayton, OH
January 7, 2023; 2:00 p.m.		at Fordham	L 54–66	6–9 (0–3)	15 – Quisenberry	15 – Moore	3 – Tied	Rose Hill Gymnasium (1,259); Bronx, NY
January 11, 2023; 7:00 p.m., ESPN+		Duquesne	L 80–92	6–10 (0–4)	25 – Brown	9 – Fleming	7 – Reynolds II	Hagan Arena (1,003); Philadelphia, PA
January 14, 2023; 12:30 p.m., USA		Loyola Chicago	W 86–55	7–10 (1–4)	17 – Tied	8 – Obinna	5 – Tied	Hagan Arena (1,442); Philadelphia, PA
January 16, 2023; 2:00 p.m., CBSSN		at La Salle; Philadelphia Big 5	W 71–59	8–10 (2–4)	20 – Brown	9 – Tied	6 – Greer	Tom Gola Arena (2,134); Philadelphia, PA
January 21, 2023; 1:00 p.m., ESPN+		UMass	W 74–68	9–10 (3–4)	25 – Brown	6 – Tied	4 – Tied	Hagan Arena (1,611); Philadelphia, PA
January 25, 2023; 7:00 p.m., ESPN+		at George Washington	L 91–92	9–11 (3–5)	31 – Greer III	11 – Greer III	5 – Klaczek	Charles E. Smith Center (1,254); Washington, D.C.
January 29, 2023; 12:00 p.m., USA		at George Mason	W 79–76	10–11 (4–5)	30 – Reynolds II	12 – Obinna	4 – Greer III	EagleBank Arena (4,011); Fairfax, VA
February 1, 2023; 7:00 p.m., ESPN+		Rhode Island	W 64–50	11–11 (5–5)	18 – Brown	8 – Brown	4 – Greer III	Hagan Arena (1,121); Philadelphia, PA
February 5, 2023; 12:00 p.m., ESPNU		La Salle; Philadelphia Big 5	L 65–73	11–12 (5–6)	15 – Reynolds II	7 – Brown	5 – Brown	Hagan Arena (2,213); Philadelphia, PA
February 8, 2023; 9:00 p.m., ESPN+		at Loyola Chicago	W 83–71	12–12 (6–6)	24 – Reynolds	9 – Obinna	4 – Winborne	Joseph J. Gentile Arena (2,911); Chicago, IL
February 11, 2023; 1:00 p.m., ESPN+		George Washington	W 81–69	13–12 (7–6)	24 – Reynolds II	8 – Tied	6 – Greer III	Hagan Arena (1,843); Philadelphia, PA
February 15, 2023; 7:00 p.m., ESPN+		at Duquesne	L 62–76	13–13 (7–7)	22 – Greer III	11 – Fleming	3 – Greer III	UPMC Cooper Fieldhouse (1,758); Pittsburgh, PA
February 18, 2023; 12:30 p.m., USA		at Davidson	L 75–76	13–14 (7–8)	17 – Brown	9 – Tied	3 – Tied	John M. Belk Arena (3,567); Davidson, NC
February 21, 2023; 7:00 p.m., ESPN+		VCU	L 63–88	13–15 (7–9)	21 – Reynolds II	11 – Fleming	4 – Brown	Hagan Arena (1,398); Philadelphia, PA
February 26, 2023; 12:00 p.m., USA		at St. Bonaventure	L 76–89	13–16 (7–10)	33 – Reynolds II	7 – Greer III	3 – Greer III	Reilly Center (4,394); Olean, NY
March 1, 2023; 7:00 p.m., ESPN+		Richmond	W 83–67	14–16 (8–10)	33 – Reynolds II	12 – Fleming	3 – Tied	Hagan Arena (1,594); Philadelphia, PA
A-10 tournament
March 7, 2023; 2:00 p.m., ESPN+	(10)	vs. (15) Loyola Chicago; First round	W 72–67	15–16	22 – Greer III	10 – Greer III	7 – Greer III	Barclays Center; Brooklyn, NY
March 8, 2023; 5:00 p.m., USA	(10)	vs. (7) George Washington; Second round	W 87–76	16–16	34 – Reynolds II	8 – Fleming	4 – Tied	Barclays Center; Brooklyn, NY
March 9, 2023; 5:00 p.m., USA	(10)	vs. (2) Dayton; Quarterfinals	L 54–60	16–17	19 – Reynolds II	9 – Tied	5 – Greer III	Barclays Center; Brooklyn, NY
*Non-conference game. ^{#}Rankings from AP Poll. (#) Tournament seedings in parentheses. All times are in Eastern Time.
