= Keith Urgo =

American basketball coach (born 1980)

Biographical details
- Born: April 25, 1980 (age 46); Washington, D.C., U.S.

Playing career
- 1998–2002: Fairfield

Coaching career (HC unless noted)
- 2004–2007: Gonzaga College HS (assistant)
- 2010–2012: Villanova (assistant)
- 2012–2021: Penn State (assistant)
- 2021–2022: Fordham (Associate HC)
- 2022–2025: Fordham
- 2025-present: Gonzaga College HS

Administrative career (AD unless noted)
- 2007–2008: Villanova (video assistant)
- 2008–2010: Villanova (Director of Basketball Operations)

Head coaching record
- Overall: 50–49 (.505)

Accomplishments and honors

Awards
- Atlantic 10 Coach of the Year (2023)

Keith Urgo (born April 25, 1980) is an American college basketball coach who was most recently the head coach of the Fordham Rams men's basketball program in the Atlantic 10 Conference.

== Early years and playing career ==
Urgo was born in Washington D.C. the 8th of 10 children to parents originally from Brooklyn; his father attended Fordham. Urgo attended Gonzaga College High School. For college, he attended Fairfield University where he was a dual sport athlete, playing basketball and lacrosse.

== Coaching career ==
After graduating from college, Urgo founded the non-profit organization, Playing for Peace. He began his coaching career in 2004 as an assistant coach for Gonzaga College High School, his former high school before leaving in 2008 for Villanova, where he started off as a video assistant before becoming the teams director of basketball operations. In 2012 he was hired by Penn State, where he served as an assistant head coach for 10 years. In 2021 he was hired as the associate head coach for Fordham under Kyle Neptune.

On April 28, 2022 Urgo was named the head coach of Fordham following the departure of Neptune to Villanova.

On March 20, 2025, Urgo was relieved of his duties as head coach of the Rams following two consecutive losing seasons, including an eight-game losing streak to end the 2024-25 campaign. The Rams finished last in the Atlantic 10 Conference with a 3-15 record in league play.

On May 20, 2025, Urgo was hired as the head coach at his alma mater, Gonzaga College High School in Washington D.C.

== Head coaching record ==
Record table
Season	Team	Overall	Conference	Standing	Postseason
Fordham Rams (Atlantic 10 Conference) (2022–2025)
2022–23	Fordham	25–8	12–6	T–2nd	
2023–24	Fordham	13–20	6–12	T–10th	
2024–25	Fordham	12–21	3–15	15th	
Fordham:		50–49 (.505)	21–33 (.389)		
Total:		50–49 (.505)			
