= Chris Caputo =

American basketball coach (born 1980)

Current position
- Title: Head coach
- Team: George Washington
- Conference: Atlantic 10
- Record: 76–64 (.543)

Biographical details
- Born: June 22, 1980 (age 46); Elmhurst, New York, U.S.

Playing career
- 1999–2002: Westfield State

Coaching career (HC unless noted)
- 2005–2011: George Mason (assistant)
- 2011–2015: Miami (FL) (assistant)
- 2015–2022: Miami (FL) (Associate HC)
- 2022–present: George Washington

Administrative career (AD unless noted)
- 2002–2005: George Mason (DBO/video)

Head coaching record
- Overall: 76–64 (.543)

Chris Caputo (born June 22, 1980) is an American basketball coach who is the current head coach of the George Washington Revolutionaries men's basketball team.

== Playing career ==
Caputo played four years of basketball at Westfield State, where he served as team captain.

== Coaching career ==
After graduation, Caputo joined Jim Larrañaga's coaching staff at George Mason as the director of operations and video coordinator. He'd become a full assistant coach in 2005, where that year, the Patriots would reach the 2006 Final Four. While on staff at George Mason, the team would reach the NCAA tournament three times, along with the NIT once.

When Larrañaga accepted the head coaching position at Miami in 2011, Caputo would join him on staff where he be a part of the Hurricanes' 2013 ACC regular season and tournament titles en route to a Sweet 16 appearance in the 2013 NCAA tournament. Caputo would be on staff for five postseason appearances, including runner-up in the 2015 NIT, along with five total NCAA Tournament appearances, including the Elite Eight in 2022.

On April 1, 2022, Caputo was named the head coach at George Washington, replacing Jamion Christian.

== Head coaching record ==
Record table
Season	Team	Overall	Conference	Standing	Postseason
George Washington Revolutionaries (Atlantic 10) (2022–Present)
2022–23	George Washington	16–16	10–8	T–6th	
2023–24	George Washington	15–17	4–14	15th	
2024–25	George Washington	21–13	9–9	T–7th	CBC First round
2025–26	George Washington	19–16	8–10	T–8th	NIT Second Round
2026–27	George Washington	5–2	0–0		
George Washington:		76–64 (.543)	31–41 (.431)		
Total:		76–64 (.543)			
National champion Postseason invitational champion Conference regular season champion Conference regular season and conference tournament champion Division regular season champion Division regular season and conference tournament champion Conference tournament champion
