= 2020–21 George Mason Patriots men's basketball team =

American college basketball season

2020–21 George Mason Patriots men's basketball
- Conference: Atlantic 10 Conference
- Record: 13–9 (8–6 A-10)
- Head coach: Dave Paulsen (6th season)
- Assistant coaches: Duane Simpkins; Maurice Joseph; Bryson Johnson
- Home arena: EagleBank Arena

2020–21 Atlantic 10 men's basketball standings
| | Conf. | | | | Overall |
| Team | W | | L | PCT | W | | L | PCT |
|---|---|---|---|---|---|---|---|---|
| St. Bonaventure† | 11 | – | 4 | .733 | 16 | – | 5 | .762 |
| VCU | 10 | – | 4 | .714 | 19 | – | 7 | .731 |
| Davidson | 7 | – | 4 | .636 | 13 | – | 9 | .591 |
| Saint Louis | 6 | – | 4 | .600 | 14 | – | 7 | .667 |
| UMass | 6 | – | 4 | .600 | 8 | – | 7 | .533 |
| George Mason | 8 | – | 6 | .571 | 13 | – | 9 | .591 |
| Dayton | 9 | – | 7 | .563 | 14 | – | 10 | .583 |
| Richmond | 6 | – | 5 | .545 | 14 | – | 9 | .609 |
| Duquesne | 7 | – | 7 | .500 | 9 | – | 9 | .500 |
| Rhode Island | 7 | – | 10 | .412 | 10 | – | 15 | .400 |
| George Washington | 3 | – | 5 | .375 | 5 | – | 12 | .294 |
| La Salle | 6 | – | 11 | .353 | 9 | – | 16 | .360 |
| Saint Joseph's | 3 | – | 9 | .250 | 5 | – | 15 | .250 |
| Fordham | 2 | – | 11 | .154 | 2 | – | 12 | .143 |
† 2021 A10 Tournament winner

The 2020–21 George Mason Patriots Men's basketball team represented George Mason University during the 2020–21 NCAA Division I men's basketball season. The season marked the 55th for the program, the sixth under head coach Dave Paulsen, and the eighth as members of the Atlantic 10 Conference. The Patriots played their home games at EagleBank Arena in Fairfax, Virginia. The Patriots finished the season 13–9, 8–6 in A-10 play to finish in sixth place. They defeated George Washington in the second round of the A-10 tournament before losing to Davidson in the quarterfinals.

On March 16, 2021, the school fired Paulsen. A week later, the school named Tennessee assistant Kim English the team's new head coach.

== Previous season ==
The Patriots finished the 2019–20 season 17–15, 5–13 in A-10 play to finish in twelfth place. The A-10 tournament was canceled after the first round due to the ongoing COVID-19 pandemic.

== Offseason ==
=== Departures ===
| Name | Number | Pos. | Height | Weight | Year | Hometown | Notes |
|---|---|---|---|---|---|---|---|
| Goanar Mar | 0 | F | 6’7” | 214 | Junior | Mankato, MN | Transferred to Northern Iowa |
| Justin Kier | 1 | G | 6’4” | 197 | Senior | Grottoes, VA | Transferred to Georgia |
| Jason Douglas-Stanley | 20 | G | 6’2” | 191 | Sophomore | Mount Vernon, NY | Transferred to Manhattan |

=== 2020 recruiting class ===
College recruiting information
| Name | Hometown | School | Height | Weight | Commit date |
|---|---|---|---|---|---|
| Ronald Polite; G | Temple Hills, MD | Oxon Hill High School | 6 ft 2 in (1.88 m) | N/A | |
| Ronald Polite; G | Recruit ratings: Scout: | | | | |
| Tyler Kolek; G | Cumberland, RI | St. George's School | 6 ft 3 in (1.91 m) | 190 lb (86 kg) | |
| Tyler Kolek; G | Recruit ratings: Scout: | | | | |
| Otis Frazier III; G | Buckeye, AZ | Mt. Zion Prep | 6 ft 6 in (1.98 m) | 207 lb (94 kg) | |
| Otis Frazier III; G | Recruit ratings: Scout: | | | | |
| Malik Henry; F | Longview, TX | Longview High School | 6 ft 8 in (2.03 m) | 211 lb (96 kg) | |
| Malik Henry; F | Recruit ratings: Scout: | | | | |
Overall recruit ranking:
Note: In many cases, Scout, Rivals, 247Sports, On3, and ESPN may conflict in their listings of height and weight.; In these cases, the average was taken. ESPN grades are on a 100-point scale.; Sources: "ESPN". ESPN.; "2020 Team Ranking". Rivals.

== Honors and awards ==
Atlantic 10 Rookie of the Year

- Tyler Kolek

All Atlantic 10 Third Team

- Jordan Miller

Atlantic 10 All-Defensive Team

- A.J. Wilson

Atlantic 10 Player of the Week

- Josh Oduro - Feb. 22

Atlantic 10 Rookie of the Week

- Tyler Kolek - Dec. 28
- Tyler Kolek - Feb. 15
- Tyler Kolek - Mar. 2

== Roster ==
2020–21 George Mason Patriots men's basketball team
Players
Coaches

| Pos. | # | Name | Height | Weight | Year | Previous school | Hometown |
|---|---|---|---|---|---|---|---|
| G | 1 | Ronald Polite | 6 ft 2 in (1.88 m) | 175 lb (79 kg) | Fr | Oxon Hill High School | Temple Hills, MD |
| G | 2 | Xavier Johnson | 6 ft 1 in (1.85 m) | 186 lb (84 kg) | So | Episcopal High School | Germantown, MD |
| G | 3 | Bahaïde Haïdara | 6 ft 6 in (1.98 m) | 203 lb (92 kg) | So | Dawson College | Montréal, Canada |
| G/F | 5 | Otis Frazier III | 6 ft 6 in (1.98 m) | 207 lb (94 kg) | Fr | Mt. Zion Prep | Buckeye, AZ |
| G | 10 | Jamal Hartwell II | 5 ft 10 in (1.78 m) | 155 lb (70 kg) | Jr | Fairfax High School | Inglewood, CA |
| G | 11 | Jordan Miller | 6 ft 6 in (1.98 m) | 202 lb (92 kg) | Jr | Loudoun Valley High School | Middleburg, VA |
| F | 12 | A. J. Wilson | 6 ft 7 in (2.01 m) | 230 lb (104 kg) | RS Sr | Elev8 Prep Academy | Laurel, MD |
| F | 13 | Josh Oduro | 6 ft 9 in (2.06 m) | 228 lb (103 kg) | So | Paul VI High School | Gainesville, VA |
| G | 20 | Tyler Kolek | 6 ft 3 in (1.91 m) | 190 lb (86 kg) | Fr | St. George's School | Cumberland, RI |
| G | 21 | Jack Tempchin (W) | 5 ft 9 in (1.75 m) | 161 lb (73 kg) | RS Sr | Blake High School | Silver Spring, MD |
| G | 22 | Mehki McCray (W) | 6 ft 1 in (1.85 m) | 194 lb (88 kg) | Sr | St. Charles High School | Waldorf, MD |
| G | 23 | Javon Greene | 6 ft 2 in (1.88 m) | 190 lb (86 kg) | Jr | Henry County High School | McDonough, GA |
| G | 24 | Lysander Rehnstrom (W) | 6 ft 4 in (1.93 m) | 190 lb (86 kg) | Fr | Herndon High School | Herndon, VA |
| F | 25 | Jake Nichols (W) | 6 ft 7 in (2.01 m) | 215 lb (98 kg) | Fr | Brewster Academy | Baltimore, MD |
| F | 30 | Chance Konnor (W) | 6 ft 11 in (2.11 m) | 235 lb (107 kg) | Sr | South Lakes High School | Reston, VA |
| G | 32 | Ian Boyd | 6 ft 4 in (1.93 m) | 230 lb (104 kg) | RS Sr | Apex High School | Apex, NC |
| F | 33 | Greg Calixte | 6 ft 8 in (2.03 m) | 235 lb (107 kg) | Sr | Mount Vernon High School | Mount Vernon, NY |
| F | 35 | Malik Henry | 6 ft 8 in (2.03 m) | 211 lb (96 kg) | Fr | Longview High School | Longview, TX |

Head coach

- Dave Paulsen (Williams)

Assistant coach(es)

- Duane Simpkins (Maryland)
- Maurice Joseph (Vermont)
- Bryson Johnson (Bucknell)

Legend

- (C) Team captain
- (S) Suspended
- (I) Ineligible
- (W) Walk-on
- Injured
- Current redshirt

Roster
Last update: March 20, 2021

== Player statistics ==
| Player | GP | GS | MPG | FG% | 3FG% | FT% | RPG | APG | SPG | BPG | PPG |
|---|---|---|---|---|---|---|---|---|---|---|---|
| Jordan Miller | 20 | 18 | 32.9 | .463 | .333 | .775 | 6.1 | 2.0 | 1.0 | 0.4 | 15.8 |
| Javon Greene | 22 | 19 | 28.6 | .423 | .375 | .775 | 5.0 | 2.2 | 1.8 | 0.0 | 11.5 |
| Tyler Kolek | 22 | 18 | 30.7 | .399 | .358 | .794 | 3.6 | 2.3 | 1.3 | 0.1 | 10.8 |
| Josh Oduro | 22 | 16 | 23.5 | .508 | .200 | .583 | 6.0 | 1.2 | 0.5 | 0.8 | 10.0 |
| A.J. Wilson | 21 | 20 | 22.9 | .397 | .238 | .500 | 5.0 | 0.8 | 0.3 | 2.1 | 7.8 |
| Jamal Hartwell II | 22 | 9 | 18.3 | .383 | .368 | .889 | 1.4 | 1.1 | 0.4 | 0.0 | 5.4 |
| Xavier Johnson | 21 | 9 | 19.0 | .323 | .250 | .613 | 1.8 | 1.8 | 0.8 | 0.1 | 3.3 |
| Ronald Polite | 19 | 0 | 12.8 | .293 | .136 | .536 | 0.9 | 1.1 | 0.4 | 0.1 | 2.4 |
| Bahaïde Haïdara | 22 | 0 | 8.7 | .556 | .000 | .188 | 2.9 | 0.6 | 0.6 | 0.2 | 2.4 |
| Malik Henry | 8 | 0 | 3.6 | .667 | .000 | .467 | 1.1 | 0.3 | 0.0 | 0.4 | 2.4 |
| Otis Frazier III | 15 | 0 | 7.7 | .382 | .313 | .500 | 1.6 | 0.2 | 0.3 | 0.5 | 2.2 |
| Greg Calixte | 19 | 1 | 8.2 | .600 | .000 | .231 | 1.9 | 0.2 | 0.1 | 0.2 | 2.5 |
| Chance Konnor | 2 | 0 | 2.5 | 1.000 | .000 | .000 | 0.0 | 0.0 | 0.0 | 0.0 | 1.0 |
| Jack Tempchin | 5 | 0 | 2.4 | .000 | .000 | .667 | 0.4 | 0.0 | 0.2 | 0.0 | 0.4 |
| Mehki McCray | 5 | 0 | 1.8 | 1.000 | .000 | .000 | 0.0 | 0.0 | 0.0 | 0.0 | 0.4 |
| Jake Nichols | 2 | 0 | 1.0 | .000 | .000 | .000 | 0.5 | 0.0 | 0.2 | 0.0 | 0.0 |
| Lysander Rehnstrom | 2 | 0 | 1.5 | .000 | .000 | .000 | 0.0 | 0.0 | 0.0 | 0.0 | 0.0 |

== Schedule and results ==
| Date time, TV | Rank^{#} | Opponent^{#} | Result | Record | High points | High rebounds | High assists | Site (attendance) city, state |
Non-conference regular season
| November 26, 2020*; 2:00 pm, ESPN+ | | vs. Queens (NC); DC Paradise Jam | W 66–65 | 1–0 | 19 – Greene | 4 – Miller | 2 – Tied (4) | Washington Convention Center (0); Washington, DC |
| November 27, 2020*; 2:00 pm, ESPN+ | | vs. Belmont; DC Paradise Jam | L 67–77 | 1–1 | 19 – Miller | 9 – Miller | 4 – Johnson | Washington Convention Center (0); Washington, DC |
| November 28, 2020*; 2:00 pm, ESPN+ | | vs. Howard; DC Paradise Jam | W 84–70 | 2–1 | 30 – Miller | 8 – Miller | 9 – Hartwell II | Washington Convention Center (0); Washington, DC |
| December 21, 2020*; 1:00 pm, ESPN+ | | VMI | W 68–66 | 3–1 | 22 – Wilson | 10 – Wilson | 5 – Johnson | EagleBank Arena (197); Fairfax, VA |
| December 23, 2020*; 4:00 pm, ESPN+ | | Towson | W 70–65 | 4–1 | 19 – Oduro | 8 – Oduro | 3 – Haidara, Johnson | EagleBank Arena (193); Fairfax, VA |
| December 26, 2020*; 4:00 pm, ESPN+ | | Norfolk State | L 65–68 | 4–2 | 19 – Kolek | 9 – Haidara, Oduro | 4 – Kolek, Miller | EagleBank Arena (202); Fairfax, VA |
A-10 regular season
| December 30, 2020; 6:00 pm, ESPN+ | | at Massachusetts | W 93–92 ^{2OT} | 5–2 (1–0) | 26 – Miller | 8 – Miller | 5 – Miller | Mullins Center (0); Amherst, MA |
| January 2, 2021; 4:30 pm, NBCSN | | at Dayton | L 64–75 | 5–3 (1–1) | 16 – Kolek | 7 – Oduro | 3 – Johnson, Kolek, Polite | UD Arena (0); Dayton, OH |
| January 6, 2021; 7:00 pm, MASN | | VCU; Rivalry | L 61–66 | 5–4 (1–2) | 13 – Oduro | 9 – Oduro | 3 – Johnson | EagleBank Arena (250); Fairfax, VA |
| January 9, 2021; 12:00 pm, CBSSN | | Richmond | L 55–77 | 5–5 (1–3) | 16 – Wilson | 7 – Greene | 3 – Miller | EagleBank Arena (250); Fairfax, VA |
| January 13, 2021; 7:00 pm | | La Salle | W 75–42 | 6–5 (2–3) | 18 – Greene | 12 – Wilson | 4 – Oduro | EagleBank Arena (250); Fairfax, VA |
| January 16, 2021; 2:00 pm, NBCSN | | at Rhode Island | L 60–80 | 6–6 (2–4) | 22 – Miller | 9 – Greene | 3 – Greene | Ryan Center (0); Kingston, RI |
| January 20, 2021; 7:00 pm, ESPN+ | | Saint Joseph's | W 87–85 ^{2OT} | 7–6 (3–4) | 25 – Greene | 13 – Oduro | 2 – Tied (4) | EagleBank Arena (180); Fairfax, VA |
| January 23, 2021; 12:30 pm, NBCSN | | at Saint Joseph's | W 71–62 | 8–6 (4–4) | 18 – Miller | 8 – Greene | 4 – Greene, Haidara | Hagan Arena (0); Philadelphia, PA |
| January 27, 2021; 7:00 pm, MASN2 | | George Washington | Postponed due to COVID-19 issues | | | | | EagleBank Arena (–); Fairfax, VA |
| January 30, 2021; 2:00 pm, CBSSN | | at St. Bonaventure | L 67–84 | 8–7 (4–5) | 19 – Miller | 6 – Wilson | 6 – Greene | Reilly Center (0); Olean, NY |
| February 2, 2021; 6:00 pm | | at Richmond | Postponed due to COVID-19 issues | | | | | Robins Center (–); Richmond, VA |
| February 5, 2021; 7:00 pm, ESPN2 | | at Dayton | L 65–74 | 8–8 (4–6) | 16 – Miller | 9 – Wilson | 3 – Kolek | UD Arena (0); Dayton, OH |
| February 10, 2021; 7:00 pm, ESPN+ | | Fordham | W 77–45 | 9–8 (5–6) | 16 – Miller | 6 – Oduro | 4 – Miller, Oduro | EagleBank Arena (190); Fairfax, VA |
| February 13, 2021; 7:00 pm, MASN | | Duquesne | Postponed due to COVID-19 issues | | | | | EagleBank Arena (–); Fairfax, VA |
| February 20, 2021; 2:30 pm, NBCSN | | at VCU; Rivalry | W 79–76 ^{OT} | 10–8 (6–6) | 27 – Oduro | 9 – Miller | 4 – Greene | Siegel Center (250); Richmond, VA |
| February 24, 2021; 6:00 pm, ESPN+ | | George Washington | W 63–58 | 11–8 (7–6) | 16 – Kolek | 15 – Miller | 4 – Kolek | EagleBank Arena (250); Fairfax, VA |
| February 27, 2021; 4:30 pm, NBCSN | | La Salle | W 89–54 | 12–8 (8–6) | 16 – Wilson | 6 – Wilson | 5 – Miller, Polite | EagleBank Arena (250); Fairfax, VA |
A-10 tournament
| March 4, 2021; 5:30 pm, NBCSN | (6) | vs. (11) George Washington; Second round | W 73–59 | 13–8 | 19 – Miller | 10 – Miller | 3 – Greene | Robins Center (250); Richmond, VA |
| March 5, 2021; 5:30 pm, NBCSN | (6) | vs. (3) Davidson; Quarterfinals | L 67–99 | 13–9 | 15 – Miller | 4 – Frazier III, Miller, Oduro | 3 – Oduro | Robins Center (250); Richmond, VA |
*Non-conference game. ^{#}Rankings from AP Poll. (#) Tournament seedings in parentheses. All times are in Eastern Time.
