= 2020–21 Davidson Wildcats men's basketball team =

American college basketball season

2020–21 Davidson Wildcats men's basketball

NIT, First round
- Conference: Atlantic 10 Conference
- Record: 13–9 (7–4 A-10)
- Head coach: Bob McKillop (32nd season)
- Assistant coaches: Matt McKillop; Will Reigel; Kevin Kuwik
- Home arena: John M. Belk Arena

2020–21 Atlantic 10 men's basketball standings
	Conf.				Overall
Team	W		L	PCT	W		L	PCT
St. Bonaventure†	11	–	4	.733	16	–	5	.762
VCU	10	–	4	.714	19	–	7	.731
Davidson	7	–	4	.636	13	–	9	.591
Saint Louis	6	–	4	.600	14	–	7	.667
UMass	6	–	4	.600	8	–	7	.533
George Mason	8	–	6	.571	13	–	9	.591
Dayton	9	–	7	.563	14	–	10	.583
Richmond	6	–	5	.545	14	–	9	.609
Duquesne	7	–	7	.500	9	–	9	.500
Rhode Island	7	–	10	.412	10	–	15	.400
George Washington	3	–	5	.375	5	–	12	.294
La Salle	6	–	11	.353	9	–	16	.360
Saint Joseph's	3	–	9	.250	5	–	15	.250
Fordham	2	–	11	.154	2	–	12	.143
† 2021 A10 Tournament winner

The 2020–21 Davidson Wildcats men's basketball team represented Davidson College during the 2020–21 NCAA Division I men's basketball season. The Wildcats were led by 32nd-year head coach Bob McKillop and played their home games at the John M. Belk Arena in Davidson, North Carolina as members of the Atlantic 10 (A-10) Conference. They finished the season 13–9, 7–4 in A-10 play, to finish in third place. They defeated George Mason in the quarterfinals of the A-10 tournament before losing in the semifinals to VCU. They were invited to the National Invitation Tournament where they lost in the first round to NC State.

== Previous season ==
The Wildcats finished the 2019–20 season 16–14, 10–8 in A-10 play, to finish in seventh place. Their season ended when the A-10 tournament and all other postseason tournaments were canceled due to the ongoing coronavirus pandemic.

== Offseason ==
=== Departures ===
Name	Number	Pos.	Height	Weight	Year	Hometown	Reason for departure
Jón Axel Guðmundsson	3	G	6'4"	200	Senior	Grindavík, Iceland	Graduated
Cal Freundlich	4	G	6'2"	160	Senior	New York, NY	Walk-on; graduated
Malcolm Wynter	5	G	5'10"	155	Senior	Greenlawn, NY	Walk-on; graduated
Luke Frampton	14	G	6'5"	200	RS Sophomore	Poca, WV	Transferred to Western Kentucky
Patrick Casey	15	F	6'6"	210	Senior	Fort Mill, SC	Walk-on; graduated
KiShawn Pritchett	20	G	6'6"	225	RS Senior	Mooresville, NC	Graduated
David Czerapowicz	53	G	6'3"	185	Sophomore	Gothenburg, Sweden	Transferred

=== 2020 recruiting class ===
College recruiting information
Name	Hometown	School	Height	Weight	Commit date
Grant Huffman; SG	Lakewood, OH	Saint Edward High School	6 ft 2 in (1.88 m)	N/A	Jul 14, 2019
Grant Huffman; SG	Recruit ratings: Scout: Rivals: 247Sports: (NR)				
Emory Lanier; PG	Knoxville, TN	Webb School of Knoxville	6 ft 3 in (1.91 m)	185 lb (84 kg)	Jul 16, 2019
Emory Lanier; PG	Recruit ratings: Scout: Rivals: 247Sports: (NR)				
Sam Mennenga; PF	Auckland, New Zealand	NBA Global Academy	6 ft 8 in (2.03 m)	215 lb (98 kg)	Oct 21, 2019
Sam Mennenga; PF	Recruit ratings: Scout: Rivals: 247Sports: (NR)				
Overall recruit ranking:
Note: In many cases, Scout, Rivals, 247Sports, On3, and ESPN may conflict in their listings of height and weight.; In these cases, the average was taken. ESPN grades are on a 100-point scale.; Sources: "2020 Team Ranking". Rivals.

=== 2021 recruiting class ===
College recruiting information (2021)
Name	Hometown	School	Height	Weight	Commit date
Chris Ford; SF	Huntersville, NC	North Mecklenburg High School	6 ft 5 in (1.96 m)	200 lb (91 kg)	Aug 15, 2020
Chris Ford; SF	Recruit ratings: Scout: Rivals: 247Sports: (0)				
Overall recruit ranking:
Note: In many cases, Scout, Rivals, 247Sports, On3, and ESPN may conflict in their listings of height and weight.; In these cases, the average was taken. ESPN grades are on a 100-point scale.; Sources: "2021 Team Ranking". Rivals.

== Roster ==
2020–21 Davidson Wildcats men's basketball team
Players
Coaches

Pos.	#	Name	Height	Weight	Year	Previous school	Hometown
G/F	1	Lee Hyun-jung	6 ft 7 in (2.01 m)	210 lb (95 kg)	So	NBA Global Academy	Yongin, South Korea
G	2	Emory Lanier	6 ft 3 in (1.91 m)	180 lb (82 kg)	Fr	Woodward Academy	Atlanta, GA
F	3	Sam Mennenga	6 ft 9 in (2.06 m)	245 lb (111 kg)	RS Fr	Westlake Boys High School	Auckland, New Zealand
G	5	Grant Huffman	6 ft 3 in (1.91 m)	185 lb (84 kg)	Fr	St. Edward's High School	Aurora, OH
F	12	David Kristensen	6 ft 10 in (2.08 m)	210 lb (95 kg)	So	Marelisborg Gymnasium	Aarhus, Denmark
G	13	Mike Jones	6 ft 5 in (1.96 m)	210 lb (95 kg)	RS So	Woodbury High School	Woodbury, MN
G	22	Drew Dibble (W)	5 ft 11 in (1.8 m)	185 lb (84 kg)	RS Jr	University School of Nashville	Nashville, TN
G	24	Carter Collins	6 ft 3 in (1.91 m)	190 lb (86 kg)	Sr	East Chapel Hill High School	Chapel Hill, NC
F	25	Bates Jones (W)	6 ft 8 in (2.03 m)	225 lb (102 kg)	Sr	Charlotte Latin School	Charlotte, NC
G	31	Kellan Grady	6 ft 5 in (1.96 m)	205 lb (93 kg)	Sr	Northfield Mount Hermon School	Boston, MA
F	32	Nelson Boachie-Yiadom	6 ft 8 in (2.03 m)	220 lb (100 kg)	Jr	Loomis Chaffee School	London, England
F	35	Luka Brajkovic	6 ft 10 in (2.08 m)	250 lb (113 kg)	Jr	Gymnasium Schillerstraße	Feldkirch, Austria
G	40	Ben Craig (W)	6 ft 1 in (1.85 m)	190 lb (86 kg)	Jr	Christ School	Montreat, NC

Head coach

- Bob McKillop (Hofstra)

Assistant coach(es)

- Matt McKillop (Davidson)
- Will Reigel (Davidson)
- Kevin Kuwik (Notre Dame)

Legend

- (C) Team captain
- (S) Suspended
- (I) Ineligible
- (W) Walk-on
- Injured
- Current redshirt

Roster
Last update: May 31, 2024

== Schedule and results ==
Date time, TV	Rank^{#}	Opponent^{#}	Result	Record	High points	High rebounds	High assists	Site (attendance) city, state
Regular season
November 25, 2020*; 7:00 p.m., ESPN+		High Point	W 82–73 ^{OT}	1–0	23 – Lee	9 – Mennenga	9 – Lee	John M. Belk Arena (25); Davidson, NC
November 30, 2020*; 12:00 p.m., ESPN2		vs. No. 17 Texas; Maui Invitational quarterfinals	L 76–78	1–1	17 – Mennenga	5 – Mennenga	5 – Collins	Harrah's Cherokee Center (0); Asheville, NC
December 1, 2020*; 7:00 p.m., ESPN2		vs. Providence; Maui Invitational consolation second round	L 62–63	1–2	17 – Grady	7 – Grady	3 – Collins	Harrah's Cherokee Center (0); Asheville, NC
December 2, 2020*; 9:30 p.m., ESPN2		vs. UNLV; Maui Invitational 7th-place game	W 77–73	2–2	22 – Grady	6 – Lee	3 – Grady	Harrah's Cherokee Center (0); Asheville, NC
December 11, 2020*; 7:00 p.m., ESPN+		Georgia Southern	W 77–45	3–2	23 – Collins	8 – Brajkovic	5 – tied	John M. Belk Arena; Davidson, NC
December 15, 2020*; 7:00 p.m., ESPN+		Charlotte	L 52–63	3–3	23 – Grady	7 – Lee	3 – Collins	John M. Belk Arena (0); Davidson, NC
December 18, 2020; 7:00 p.m., ESPNU		at Rhode Island	W 67–58	4–3 (1–0)	22 – Collins	12 – B. Jones	3 – Collins	Ryan Center (0); Kingston, RI
December 22, 2020*; 7:00 p.m., ESPN+		Vanderbilt	W 85–65	5–3	23 – Lee	8 – Mennenga	3 – Collins	John M. Belk Arena (0); Davidson, NC
December 30, 2020; 7:00 p.m., CBSSN		Richmond	L 74–80	5–4 (1–1)	17 – Lee	14 – Brajkovic	5 – Collins	John M. Belk Arena (0); Davidson, NC
January 2, 2021; 2:30 p.m., NBCSN		at VCU; Postponed due to COVID-19 issues						Siegel Center; Richmond, VA
January 5, 2021; 7:00 p.m., CBSSN		at Duquesne	W 61–48	6–4 (2–1)	13 – tied	7 – tied	3 – tied	Kerr Fitness Center; Pittsburgh, PA
January 9, 2021; 9:00 p.m., ESPN		Dayton	L 78–89 ^{OT}	6–5 (2–2)	27 – Grady	10 – Brajkovic	2 – Jones	John M. Belk Arena; Davidson, NC
January 12, 2021; 7:00 p.m., ESPN+		Saint Joseph's	W 80–66	7–5 (3–2)	21 – Grady	9 – Mennenga	4 – tied	John M. Belk Arena; Davidson, NC
January 15, 2021; 7:00 p.m., ESPN2		at No. 24 Saint Louis; Postponed due to COVID-19 issues						Chaifetz Arena; St. Louis, MO
January 16, 2021; 2:00 p.m., ESPN+		at La Salle	W 77–53	8–5 (4–2)	24 – Collins	5 – tied	4 – Brajkovic	Tom Gola Arena; Philadelphia, PA
January 20, 2021; 1:00 p.m., ESPN+		Fordham	W 73–58	9–5 (5–2)	24 – Grady	9 – Brajkovic	3 – tied	John M. Belk Arena; Davidson, NC
January 24, 2021; 12:00 p.m., CBSSN		at Massachusetts	W 69–60	10–5 (6–2)	22 – Grady	8 – Mennenga	5 – Grady	Mullins Center; Amherst, MA
February 10, 2021; 6:00 p.m., ESPN+		at VCU; Postponed due to COVID-19 issues						Siegel Center; Richmond, VA
February 13, 2021; 7:00 p.m., ESPN+		Rhode Island; Postponed due to COVID-19 issues						John M. Belk Arena; Davidson, NC
February 19, 2021*; 3:00 p.m., ESPN+		Southern Virginia	W 101–51	11–5	25 – Grady	8 – tied	5 – Lee	John M. Belk Arena; Davidson, NC
February 21, 2021; 3:30 p.m., NBCSN		at St. Bonaventure	L 58–69	11–6 (6–3)	18 – tied	5 – Lee	5 – Grady	Reilly Center; Olean, NY
February 24, 2021; 5:00 p.m., ESPN+		St. Bonaventure	L 53–56	11–7 (6–4)	16 – Collins	7 – Collins	3 – Collins	John M. Belk Arena; Davidson, NC
February 27, 2021; 2:00 p.m., ESPNU		VCU	W 65–57	12–7 (7–4)	15 – Brajkovic	5 – Lee	3 – tied	John M. Belk Arena (225); Davidson, NC
A-10 tournament
March 5, 2021; 5:30 p.m., NBCSN	(3)	vs. (6) George Mason; Quarterfinals	W 99–67	13–7	32 – Grady	6 – Grady	4 – Brajkovic	Robins Center; Richmond, VA
March 6, 2021; 9:00 p.m., CBSSN	(3)	at (2) VCU; Semifinals	L 52–64	13–8	13 – tied	9 – Brajkovic	4 – Lee	Siegel Center; Richmond, VA
NIT
March 18, 2021; 7:00 p.m., ESPN	(2)	vs. (3) NC State; First round – Colorado State bracket	L 61–75	13–9	15 – Brajkovic	6 – Mennenga	5 – Brajkovic	The Super Pit; Denton, TX
*Non-conference game. ^{#}Rankings from AP poll. (#) Tournament seedings in parentheses. All times are in Eastern Time.
