= 2020–21 Rhode Island Rams men's basketball team =

American college basketball season

2020–21 Rhode Island Rams men's basketball

Hall of Fame Tip-Off champions
- Conference: Atlantic 10 Conference
- Record: 10–15 (7–10 A-10)
- Head coach: David Cox (3rd season)
- Assistant coaches: T. J. Buchanan; Austin Carroll; Kevin Sutton
- Home arena: Ryan Center

2020–21 Atlantic 10 men's basketball standings
	Conf.				Overall
Team	W		L	PCT	W		L	PCT
St. Bonaventure†	11	–	4	.733	16	–	5	.762
VCU	10	–	4	.714	19	–	7	.731
Davidson	7	–	4	.636	13	–	9	.591
Saint Louis	6	–	4	.600	14	–	7	.667
UMass	6	–	4	.600	8	–	7	.533
George Mason	8	–	6	.571	13	–	9	.591
Dayton	9	–	7	.563	14	–	10	.583
Richmond	6	–	5	.545	14	–	9	.609
Duquesne	7	–	7	.500	9	–	9	.500
Rhode Island	7	–	10	.412	10	–	15	.400
George Washington	3	–	5	.375	5	–	12	.294
La Salle	6	–	11	.353	9	–	16	.360
Saint Joseph's	3	–	9	.250	5	–	15	.250
Fordham	2	–	11	.154	2	–	12	.143
† 2021 A10 Tournament winner

The 2020–21 Rhode Island Rams basketball team represented the University of Rhode Island during the 2020–21 NCAA Division I men's basketball season. The Rams, led by third-year head coach David Cox, played their home games at the Ryan Center in Kingston, Rhode Island as members of the Atlantic 10 Conference. They finished the season 10–15, 7–10 in A-10 play, to finish in 10th place. They lost in the second round of the Atlantic 10 tournament to Dayton.

== Previous season ==
The Rams finished the 2019–20 season 21–9, 13–5 in A-10 play, to finish in third place. They were to play the winner of Duquesne and Fordham in the quarterfinals of the 2020 Atlantic 10 men's basketball tournament, but the tournament was cancelled due to the COVID-19 pandemic prior to Rhode Island playing a game. The remainder of the season was cancelled due to the pandemic.

== Offseason ==
=== Departures ===
Name	Number	Pos.	Height	Weight	Year	Hometown	Notes
Tyrese Martin	4	G	6'6"	205	Sophomore	Allentown, PA	Transferred to UConn
Cyril Langevine	10	F	6'8"	230	Senior	East Orange, NJ	Graduated
Jeff Dowtin	11	F	6'3"	185	Senior	Washington, D.C.	Graduated
Eric Dadika	13	G	6'0"	175	Senior	Milltown, NJ	Graduated
Jordan Green	20	G	5'9"	160	Senior	The Bronx, NY	Graduated
Jacob Toppin	21	F	6'8"	190	Freshman	Brooklyn, NY	Transferred to Kentucky
Elijah Wood	33	G	6'5"	190	Freshman	Milltown, NJ	Decommitted, transferred to Nebraska

=== Incoming transfers ===
Name	Number	Pos.	Height	Weight	Year	Hometown	Previous school
Allen Bertrand	4	G	6'5"	200	Junior	Philadelphia, PA	Transferred from Towson
Malik Martin	12	G	6'6"	210	Junior	Staten Island, NY	Transferred from Charlotte
Umberto Brusadin	14	G	6'0"	180	Graduate	Latina, Italy	Transferred from Caldwell, walk-on
Jalen Carey	15	G	6'3"	186	RS-Sophomore	Harlem, NY	Transferred from Syracuse
Makhi Mitchell	21	C	6'9"	230	Sophomore	Washington, D.C.	Transferred from Maryland
Makhel Mitchell	22	C	6'10"	245	Sophomore	Washington, D.C.	Transferred from Maryland

=== 2020 recruiting class ===
College recruiting
Name	Hometown	School	Height	Weight	Commit date
Ishmael Leggett; SG	Washington, D.C.	St. John's College High School	6 ft 2 in (1.88 m)	165 lb (75 kg)	Sep 19, 2019
Ishmael Leggett; SG	Recruit ratings: Scout: Rivals: (NR)				
Tres Berry; PG	Cleveland, TN	Scotland Campus	6 ft 4 in (1.93 m)	189 lb (86 kg)	Apr 10, 2020
Tres Berry; PG	Recruit ratings: Scout: Rivals: (64)				
Overall recruit ranking:
Note: In many cases, Scout, Rivals, 247Sports, On3, and ESPN may conflict in their listings of height and weight.; In these cases, the average was taken. ESPN grades are on a 100-point scale.; Sources: "2020 Team Ranking". Rivals.

=== 2021 recruiting class ===
College recruiting
Name	Hometown	School	Height	Weight	Commit date
Abdou Samb; PF	Upper Marlboro, MD	Frederick Douglass (MD)	6 ft 8 in (2.03 m)	210 lb (95 kg)	Sep 10, 2020
Abdou Samb; PF	Recruit ratings: Scout: Rivals: (NR)				
Overall recruit ranking:
Note: In many cases, Scout, Rivals, 247Sports, On3, and ESPN may conflict in their listings of height and weight.; In these cases, the average was taken. ESPN grades are on a 100-point scale.; Sources: "2021 Team Ranking". Rivals.

== Roster ==
2020–21 Rhode Island Rams men's basketball team
Players
Coaches

Pos.	#	Name	Height	Weight	Year	Previous school	Hometown
F	0	Jermaine Harris	6 ft 8 in (2.03 m)	230 lb (104 kg)	Jr	Rock Creek Christian	Upper Marlboro, MD
G	1	Fatts Russell	5 ft 10 in (1.78 m)	165 lb (75 kg)	Sr	Imhotep Institute	Philadelphia, PA
G	2	Jeremy Sheppard	6 ft 1 in (1.85 m)	165 lb (75 kg)	RS Sr	John Marshall; Williston State College	Richmond, VA
G	4	Allen Betrand	6 ft 6 in (1.98 m)	205 lb (93 kg)	Jr	Massanutten Military Academy; Towson	Philadelphia, PA
F	5	Antwan Walker	6 ft 7 in (2.01 m)	230 lb (104 kg)	RS Jr	Massanutten Military Academy; Georgetown	Washington, D.C.
G	10	Ishmael Leggett	6 ft 2 in (1.88 m)	180 lb (82 kg)	Fr	St. John's College	Washington, D.C.
G	12	Malik Martin	6 ft 6 in (1.98 m)	210 lb (95 kg)	Jr	Curtis; Charlotte	Staten Island, NY
G	13	Tres Berry	6 ft 4 in (1.93 m)	190 lb (86 kg)	Fr	Scotland	Cleveland, TN
G	14	Umberto Brusadin (W)	6 ft 0 in (1.83 m)	180 lb (82 kg)	GS	Oak Hill Academy (NJ); Caldwell	Latina, Italy
G	15	Jalen Carey	6 ft 3 in (1.91 m)	186 lb (84 kg)	RS So	Immaculate Conception (NJ); Syracuse	Harlem, NY
C	21	Makhi Mitchell	6 ft 9 in (2.06 m)	230 lb (104 kg)	RS So	Woodrow Wilson (DC); Maryland	Washington, D.C.
C	22	Makhel Mitchell	6 ft 10 in (2.08 m)	245 lb (111 kg)	RS So	Woodrow Wilson (DC); Maryland	Washington, D.C.
F	23	D.J. Johnson	6 ft 7 in (2.01 m)	185 lb (84 kg)	RS Jr	Brooklyn Prep; Williston State	Brooklyn, NY
F	24	Ileri Ayo-Faleye	6 ft 7 in (2.01 m)	185 lb (84 kg)	Fr	Cedar Crest	Lebanon, PA
G	31	Brandon Borde	6 ft 2 in (1.88 m)	190 lb (86 kg)	Fr	Foxborough	Foxborough, MA

Head coach

- David Cox (William & Mary)

Assistant coach(es)

- T. J. Buchanan (Rhode Island)
- Austin Carroll (American)
- Kevin Sutton (James Madison)

Legend

- (C) Team captain
- (S) Suspended
- (I) Ineligible
- (W) Walk-on
- Injured
- Current redshirt

Roster
Last update: July 24, 2024

=== Depth chart ===
Pos.	Starting 5	Bench 1	Bench 2
C	Makhel Mitchell	Makhi Mitchell	Ileri Ayo-Faleye
PF	Malik Martin	Jermaine Harris	Tres Berry
SF	Antwan Walker	D.J. Johnson	Umberto Brusadin
SG	Fatts Russell	Ishmael Leggett	Brandon Borde
PG	Jeremy Sheppard	Allen Betrand	Jalen Carey

== Schedule ==
Date time, TV	Rank^{#}	Opponent^{#}	Result	Record	High points	High rebounds	High assists	Site (attendance) city, state
Non-conference regular season
November 25, 2020*; 7:00 p.m., ESPN		vs. No. 18 Arizona State; 2K Empire Classic semifinals	L 88–94 ^{OT}	0–1	19 – Sheppard	8 – Walker	6 – Russell	Mohegan Sun Arena (0); Uncasville, CT
November 26, 2020*; 7:00 p.m., ESPN		vs. Boston College; 2K Empire Classic third-place game	L 64–69	0–2	23 – Russell	6 – Walker	3 – Russell	Mohegan Sun Arena (0); Uncasville, CT
November 28, 2020*; 5:30 p.m., ESPN3		vs. South Florida; Hall of Fame Tip-Off semifinals	W 84–68	1–2	16 – Collins	7 – Durr	4 – Collins	Mohegan Sun Arena (0); Uncasville, CT
November 29, 2020*; 5:30 p.m., ESPNU		vs. San Francisco; Hall of Fame Tip-Off final	W 84–71	2–2	21 – Russell	10 – Walker	4 – Russell	Mohegan Sun Arena (0); Uncasville, CT
December 2, 2020*; 7:00 p.m., CBSSN		Seton Hall	W 76–63	3–2	17 – Russell	11 – Mitchell	2 – Russell	Ryan Center (0); Kingston, RI
December 9, 2020*; 4:30 p.m., BTN		at No. 13 Wisconsin	L 62–73	3–3	13 – Sheppard	10 – Walker	1 – tied (4)	Kohl Center (0); Madison, WI
December 13, 2020*; 12:00 p.m., CBSSN		at Western Kentucky	L 65–68	3–4	16 – Johnson	6 – Walker	4 – Russell	Diddle Arena (1,070); Bowling Green, KY
Atlantic 10 regular season
December 18, 2020; TBA, ESPN		Davidson	L 57–68	3–5 (0–1)	20 – Martin	10 – Walker	6 – Russell	Ryan Center (0); Kingston, RI
December 30, 2020; TBA, ESPN+		St. Bonaventure	W 63–57	4–5 (1–1)	17 – Sheppard	10 – tied (2)	5 – Russell	Ryan Center (0); Kingston, RI
January 3, 2021; 4:30 p.m., NBCSN		Saint Joseph's	W 85–77 ^{OT}	5–5 (2–1)	20 – Russell	8 – tied (2)	8 – Russell	Ryan Center (0); Kingston, RI
January 6, 2021; 6:00 p.m., CBSSN		at Richmond	L 73–80	5–6 (2–2)	18 – Russell	8 – Walker	4 – Russell	Robins Center (0); Richmond, VA
January 9, 2021; 2:00 p.m., CBSSN		at VCU	W 83–68	6–6 (3–2)	23 – Russell	9 – Russell	5 – Clark	Siegel Center (250); Richmond, VA
January 13, 2021; 7:00 p.m., ESPN+		at UMass	L 78–80 ^{OT}	6–7 (3–3)	23 – Mitchell	7 – Russell	7 – Sheppard	Mullins Center (0); Amherst, MA
January 16, 2021; 5:00 p.m., NBCSN		George Mason	W 80–60	7–7 (4–3)	18 – Russell	10 – Mitchell	4 – Russell	Ryan Center (0); Kingston, RI
January 20, 2021; 6:00 p.m., NBCSN		at Duquesne	L 69–71	7–8 (4–4)	16 – Mitchell	11 – Mitchell	6 – Russell	Kerr Fitness Center (0); McCandless, PA
January 24, 2021; 2:30 p.m., ESPN+		Fordham	W 52–42	8–8 (5–4)	16 – Sheppard	9 – Sheppard	2 – Sheppard	Ryan Center (0); Kingston, RI
January 27, 2021; 5:00 p.m., ESPN+		at La Salle	W 73–60	9–8 (6–4)	25 – Sheppard	5 – Sheppard	6 – Russell	Tom Gola Arena (0); Philadelphia, PA
January 30, 2021; 4:00 p.m., CBSSN		at Dayton	L 56–67	9–9 (6–5)	16 – Sheppard	6 – Sheppard	2 – Sheppard	UD Arena (0); Dayton, OH
February 3, 2021; 7:00 p.m., ESPN+		VCU	L 62–63	9–10 (6–6)	17 – Leggett	7 – Mitchell	6 – Sheppard	Ryan Center (0); Kingston, RI
February 6, 2021; 8:00 p.m., ESPN2		UMass	L 63–75	9–11 (6–7)	26 – Walker	14 – Walker	6 – Sheppard	Ryan Center (0); Kingston, RI
February 10, 2021; 9:00 p.m., CBSSN		at Saint Louis	L 60–67	9–12 (6–8)	16 – Sheppard	8 – Mitchell	3 – Sheppard	Chaifetz Arena; St. Louis, MO
February 16, 2021; 7:00 p.m., CBSSN		Dayton	W 91–89 ^{2OT}	10–12 (7–8)	20 – Russell	12 – Mitchell	7 – Russell	Ryan Center (0); Kingston, RI
February 21, 2021; 11:30 a.m., NBCSN		at George Washington	L 70–78	10–13 (7–9)	16 – Leggett	9 – Russell	10 – Russell	Charles E. Smith Center; Washington, D.C.
February 27, 2021; 7:00 p.m., ESPN+		at Duquesne	L 75–86	10–14 (7–10)	27 – Russell	6 – Martin	5 – Russell	UPMC Cooper Fieldhouse; Pittsburgh, PA
Atlantic 10 tournament
March 4, 2021; 3:30 p.m., NBCSN	(10)	vs. (7) Dayton; Second round	L 72–84	10–15	17 – Martin	9 – Russell	8 – Russell	Siegel Center (250); Richmond, VA
*Non-conference game. ^{#}Rankings from AP poll. (#) Tournament seedings in parentheses. All times are in Eastern.
