= 2020–21 Duquesne Dukes men's basketball team =

American college basketball season

2020–21 Duquesne Dukes men's basketball
- Conference: Atlantic 10 Conference
- Record: 9–9 (7–7 A-10)
- Head coach: Keith Dambrot (4th season)
- Assistant coaches: Rick McFadden; Terry Weigand; Charles Thomas; Carl Thomas
- Home arena: UPMC Cooper Fieldhouse; Kerr Fitness Center

2020–21 Atlantic 10 men's basketball standings
	Conf.				Overall
Team	W		L	PCT	W		L	PCT
St. Bonaventure†	11	–	4	.733	16	–	5	.762
VCU	10	–	4	.714	19	–	7	.731
Davidson	7	–	4	.636	13	–	9	.591
Saint Louis	6	–	4	.600	14	–	7	.667
UMass	6	–	4	.600	8	–	7	.533
George Mason	8	–	6	.571	13	–	9	.591
Dayton	9	–	7	.563	14	–	10	.583
Richmond	6	–	5	.545	14	–	9	.609
Duquesne	7	–	7	.500	9	–	9	.500
Rhode Island	7	–	10	.412	10	–	15	.400
George Washington	3	–	5	.375	5	–	12	.294
La Salle	6	–	11	.353	9	–	16	.360
Saint Joseph's	3	–	9	.250	5	–	15	.250
Fordham	2	–	11	.154	2	–	12	.143
† 2021 A10 Tournament winner

The 2020–21 Duquesne Dukes men's basketball team represented Duquesne University during the 2020–21 NCAA Division I men's basketball season. The team was led by fourth-year head coach Keith Dambrot, and played its home games at the UPMC Cooper Fieldhouse in Pittsburgh, Pennsylvania and Kerr Fitness Center in McCandless, Pennsylvania as a member of the Atlantic 10 Conference.

The Dukes finished the season 9-9, 7–7 in A-10 Play to finish in 9th place. The team defeated Richmond during the second round of the A-10 tournament, before losing in the quarterfinals to St. Bonaventure.

== Previous season ==
The Dukes finished the 2019–20 season 21–9, 11–7 in A-10 play to finish in sixth place. As the No. 6 seed in the A-10 tournament, it was scheduled to face No. 14 Fordham in the second round, but the tournament was canceled due to the COVID-19 pandemic.

== Offseason ==
=== Departures ===
Name	Number	Pos.	Height	Weight	Year	Hometown	Reason for departure
James Ellis	1	C	6'11"	230	RS Freshman	Pittsburgh, PA	Transferred to Pearl River Community College
Frankie Hughes	3	G	6'4"	195	RS Junior	Cleveland, OH	Transferred to San Diego
Lamar Norman Jr.	4	G	6'3"	180	Sophomore	Wyoming, MI	Midseason transfer
Sincere Carry	10	G	6'1"	180	Sophomore	Solon, OH	Midseason transfer to Kent State
Ashton Miller	14	G	6'5"	200	Freshman	Scotch Plains, NJ	Transferred to Wagner
Evan Buckley	22	G	6'1"	185	Freshman	Ashburn, VA	Left team for personal reasons
Jake Harper	30	G	6'3"	175	Freshman	Dayton, OH	Walk-on; left basketball program to play football
Caleb Davis	31	G	6'0"	175	Senior	New Kensington, PA	Graduated
Baylee Steele	44	C	6'11"	240	Senior	Norwalk, IA	Graduated

=== Incoming transfers ===
Name	Number	Pos.	Height	Weight	Year	Hometown	Previous School
Ryan Murphy	20	G	6'2"	185	RS Senior	Calabasas, CA	Graduate transfer from Pittsburgh. Will be eligible to play immediately.
Noah Buono	35	G	6'5"	180	Junior	Brick Township, NJ	Transferred from Ramapo College. Will be eligible to play immediately.

=== 2020 recruiting class ===
College recruiting information
Name	Hometown	School	Height	Weight	Commit date
Tyson Acuff; CG	Detroit, MI	Cass Technical High School	6 ft 4 in (1.93 m)	200 lb (91 kg)	Nov 15, 2019
Tyson Acuff; CG	Recruit ratings: Scout: Rivals: (NR)				
Toby Okani; SF	Orange, NJ	Cushing Academy	6 ft 7 in (2.01 m)	195 lb (88 kg)	Apr 10, 2020
Toby Okani; SF	Recruit ratings: Scout: Rivals: (NR)				
Mike Bejelka; PG	Solon, OH	International Sports Academy	6 ft 1 in (1.85 m)	180 lb (82 kg)	Mar 31, 2020
Mike Bejelka; PG	Recruit ratings: Scout: Rivals: (NR)				
Andre Harris; SF	Mesa, AZ	Hillcrest Prep	6 ft 7 in (2.01 m)	225 lb (102 kg)	Dec 22, 2019
Andre Harris; SF	Recruit ratings: Scout: Rivals: (NR)				
Jett Roesing; SG	Pittsburgh, PA	First Love Academy	6 ft 4 in (1.93 m)	180 lb (82 kg)	Jul 31, 2019
Jett Roesing; SG	Recruit ratings: Scout: Rivals: (NR)				
Chad Baker; SF	Santo Domingo, Dominican Republic	SPIRE Academy	6 ft 7 in (2.01 m)	190 lb (86 kg)	Mar 31, 2020
Chad Baker; SF	Recruit ratings: Scout: Rivals: (NR)				
Mounir Hima; C	Tillabéri, Niger	St. Benedict's Prep	6 ft 11 in (2.11 m)	220 lb (100 kg)	May 8, 2020
Mounir Hima; C	Recruit ratings: Scout: Rivals: (NR)				
Overall recruit ranking:
Note: In many cases, Scout, Rivals, 247Sports, On3, and ESPN may conflict in their listings of height and weight.; In these cases, the average was taken. ESPN grades are on a 100-point scale.; Sources: "2020 Team Ranking". Rivals.

== Roster ==
2020–21 Duquesne Dukes men's basketball team
Players
Coaches

Pos.	#	Name	Height	Weight	Year	Previous school	Hometown
G	0	Tavian Dunn-Martin	5 ft 8 in (1.73 m)	155 lb (70 kg)	RS Sr	Huntington HS; Akron	Huntington, WV
G	1	Tyson Acuff	6 ft 4 in (1.93 m)	200 lb (91 kg)	Fr	Cass Tech	Detroit, MI
G	2	Toby Okani	6 ft 7 in (2.01 m)	180 lb (82 kg)	Fr	Cushing Academy	Orange, NJ
G	3	Maceo Austin	6 ft 5 in (1.96 m)	190 lb (86 kg)	So	Kennedy Catholic	Sharon, PA
F	5	Marcus Weathers	6 ft 5 in (1.96 m)	215 lb (98 kg)	RS Sr	Shawnee Mission North; Miami (OH)	Overland Park, KS
G	20	Ryan Murphy	6 ft 2 in (1.88 m)	185 lb (84 kg)	RS Sr	Calabasas HS; Pittsburgh	Calabasas, CA
C	21	Michael Hughes	6 ft 8 in (2.03 m)	240 lb (109 kg)	RS Sr	Liberty North; Akron	Liberty, MO
G	22	Mike Bejelka	6 ft 1 in (1.85 m)	180 lb (82 kg)	Fr	International Sports Academy	Solon, OH
F	23	Amari Kelly	6 ft 9 in (2.06 m)	230 lb (104 kg)	RS So	Meadowcreek	Long Island, NY
G	25	Jaylen Cole-Williams (W)	6 ft 0 in (1.83 m)	170 lb (77 kg)	Fr	TLAP Sports Academy	Reston, VA
F	30	Andre Harris	6 ft 7 in (2.01 m)	225 lb (102 kg)	Fr	Hillcrest Prep	Mesa, AZ
G	31	Jett Roesing	6 ft 4 in (1.93 m)	180 lb (82 kg)	Fr	First Love Academy	Pittsburgh, PA
F	34	Austin Rotroff	6 ft 10 in (2.08 m)	240 lb (109 kg)	Jr	Wauseon	Wauseon, OH
F	35	Noah Buono	6 ft 5 in (1.96 m)	180 lb (82 kg)	Jr	Brick Township HS; Ramapo	Brick Township, NJ
F	44	Chad Baker	6 ft 7 in (2.01 m)	190 lb (86 kg)	Fr	SPIRE Institute	Santo Domingo, Dominican Republic
C	55	Mounir Hima	6 ft 11 in (2.11 m)	220 lb (100 kg)	Fr	St. Benedict's Prep	Tillabéri, Niger

Head coach

- Keith Dambrot (Akron)

Assistant coach(es)

- Rick McFadden (Akron)
- Terry Weigand (Ashland)
- Charles Thomas (Eastern Michigan)
- Carl Thomas (Eastern Michigan)

Legend

- (C) Team captain
- (S) Suspended
- (I) Ineligible
- (W) Walk-on
- Injured
- Current redshirt

Roster

== Schedule and results ==
Date time, TV	Rank^{#}	Opponent^{#}	Result	Record	Site (attendance) city, state
Non-conference regular season
November 30, 2020*; 4:00 p.m., ESPN3		vs. Little Rock; Wade Houston Tipoff Classic	L 66–76	0–1	KFC Yum! Center (125); Louisville, KY
December 2, 2020*; 6:00 p.m., ESPN3		vs. UNC Greensboro; Wade Houston Tipoff Classic	W 81–68	1–1	KFC Yum! Center; Louisville, KY
December 4, 2020*; 11:00 a.m.		vs. Winthrop; Wade Houston Tipoff Classic	Cancelled		KFC Yum! Center; Louisville, KY
December 14, 2020*; 4:00 p.m.		vs. Southern Illinois	Cancelled		Indiana Convention Center; Indianapolis, IN
December 16, 2020*; 1:00 p.m.		vs. Loyola–Chicago	Cancelled		Indiana Convention Center; Indianapolis, IN
Atlantic 10 regular season
December 30, 2020; 7:00 p.m., ESPN+		at Saint Louis; Postponed due to COVID-19 issues			Chaifetz Arena; St. Louis, MO
January 2, 2021; 12:30 p.m., NBCSN		at George Washington	W 75–63	2–1 (1–0)	Charles E. Smith Center; Washington, D.C.
January 3, 2021; 2:00 p.m., ESPN+		at George Washington	L 73–75	2–2 (1–1)	Charles E. Smith Center; Washington, D.C.
January 5, 2021; 7:00 p.m., CBSSN		Davidson	L 48–61	2–3 (1–2)	Kerr Fitness Center; McCandless, PA
January 9, 2021; 2:00 p.m., NBCSN		Fordham	W 48–45	3–3 (2–2)	Kerr Fitness Center; McCandless, PA
January 13, 2021; 7:00 p.m., CBSSN		at Dayton	L 63–72	3–4 (2–3)	UD Arena; Dayton, OH
January 15, 2021; 2:00 p.m., ESPN+		at St. Bonaventure	L 48–62	3–5 (2–4)	Reilly Center; St. Bonaventure, NY
January 20, 2021; 6:00 p.m., ESPN+		Rhode Island	W 71–69	4–5 (3–4)	Kerr Fitness Center; McCandless, PA
January 23, 2021; 7:00 p.m., ESPN+		St. Bonaventure	L 61–65	4–6 (3–5)	Kerr Fitness Center; McCandless, PA
January 27, 2021; 6:00 p.m., ESPN+		at Fordham	W 86–62	5–6 (4–5)	Rose Hill Gymnasium; Bronx, NY
January 30, 2021; 7:00 p.m., ESPN+		Saint Joseph's	W 67–50	6–6 (5–5)	Kerr Fitness Center; McCandless, PA
February 2, 2021; 9:00 p.m., ESPN2		Dayton	W 69–64	7–6 (6–5)	UPMC Cooper Fieldhouse (212); Pittsburgh, PA
February 7, 2021; 4:00 p.m., NBCSN		VCU; Postponed due to COVID-19 issues			UPMC Cooper Fieldhouse; Pittsburgh, PA
February 13, 2021; 7:00 pm, ESPN+		at George Mason; Postponed due to COVID-19 issues			EagleBank Arena; Fairfax, VA
February 20, 2021; 4:30 p.m., NBCSN		at Richmond	L 72–79	7–7 (6–6)	Robins Center; Richmond, VA
February 24, 2021; 7:00 pm, ESPN+		La Salle	L 65–85	7–8 (6–7)	Tom Gola Arena (26); Philadelphia, PA
February 27, 2021; 7:00 pm, ESPN+		Rhode Island	W 86–75	8–8 (7–7)	UPMC Cooper Fieldhouse; Pittsburgh, PA
A-10 tournament
March 4, 2021; 11:00 am, NBCSN	(9)	vs. (8) Richmond; Second round	W 67–62	9–8	Siegel Center (250); Richmond, VA
March 5, 2021; 11:00 am, NBCSN	(9)	vs. (1) St. Bonaventure; Quarterfinals	L 59–75	9–9	Robins Center (250); Richmond, VA
*Non-conference game. ^{#}Rankings from AP Poll. (#) Tournament seedings in parentheses. All times are in Eastern Time.
