= 2021 Atlantic 10 men's basketball tournament =

American college basketball postseason tournament

- Classification: Division I
- Season: 2020–21
- Teams: 14
- Site: Siegel Center & Robins Center; UD Arena; Richmond, Virginia; Dayton, Ohio
- Champions: St. Bonaventure (2nd title)
- Winning coach: Mark Schmidt (2nd title)
- MVP: Osun Osunniyi (St. Bonaventure)
- Attendance: 3,000
- Television: ESPN+, NBCSN, CBSSN, CBS

2020–21 Atlantic 10 men's basketball standings
	Conf.				Overall
Team	W		L	PCT	W		L	PCT
St. Bonaventure†	11	–	4	.733	16	–	5	.762
VCU	10	–	4	.714	19	–	7	.731
Davidson	7	–	4	.636	13	–	9	.591
Saint Louis	6	–	4	.600	14	–	7	.667
UMass	6	–	4	.600	8	–	7	.533
George Mason	8	–	6	.571	13	–	9	.591
Dayton	9	–	7	.563	14	–	10	.583
Richmond	6	–	5	.545	14	–	9	.609
Duquesne	7	–	7	.500	9	–	9	.500
Rhode Island	7	–	10	.412	10	–	15	.400
George Washington	3	–	5	.375	5	–	12	.294
La Salle	6	–	11	.353	9	–	16	.360
Saint Joseph's	3	–	9	.250	5	–	15	.250
Fordham	2	–	11	.154	2	–	12	.143
† 2021 A10 Tournament winner

The 2021 Atlantic 10 men's basketball tournament (A-10) was the postseason men's basketball tournament for the Atlantic 10 Conference's 2020–21 season. It was originally scheduled to be held from March 10 through March 14, 2021, at the Barclays Center in Brooklyn, New York. Due to COVID-19 regulations, the tournament was moved to Richmond, Virginia and was set to be played entirely at the Robins Center and Siegel Center, respectively homes of A-10 members Richmond and VCU.

The A-10 later announced that it had swapped the dates of its men's and women's tournaments. The bulk of the men's tournament was now played at the aforementioned Richmond venues from March 3 through 6. The first round and both semifinals were hosted by VCU, while the second round and both quarterfinals were split between both venues. The women's tournament, being held at the Siegel Center, took over the original men's tournament dates. Both tournament finals were held on March 14, with the women's final in Richmond and the men's final at UD Arena in Dayton, Ohio.

== Seeds ==
All 14 A-10 schools participated in the tournament. Teams were seeded by winning percentage within the conference, with a tiebreaker system to seed teams with identical percentages. Any team that did not play above 60 percent of the median number of conference games played by other members would be seeded by their NET ranking within the conference rather than by winning percentage, but all teams ultimately qualified to be seeded by winning percentage. The top 10 teams received a first-round bye and the top four teams received a double-bye, automatically advancing them to the quarterfinals.

Seed	School	Conference Record	Tiebreaker
1	St. Bonaventure	11–4	
2	VCU	10–4	
3	Davidson	7–4	
4	Saint Louis	6–4	1–0 vs. UMass
5	Massachusetts	6–4	0–1 vs. Saint Louis
6	George Mason	8–6	
7	Dayton	9–7	
8	Richmond	6–5	
9	Duquesne	7–7	
10	Rhode Island	7–10	
11	George Washington	3–5	
12	La Salle	6–11	
13	Saint Joseph's	3–9	
14	Fordham	2–11	

== Schedule ==
Session	Game	Time	Matchup	Location	Score	Television	Attendance
First round – Wednesday, March 3
1	1	12:00 pm	No. 12 La Salle vs No. 13 Saint Joseph's	Siegel Center	66–72	ESPN+	250
1	2	2:00 pm	No. 11 George Washington vs No. 14 Fordham	Siegel Center	53–49	ESPN+	250
Second round – Thursday, March 4
2	3	11:00 am	No. 8 Richmond vs No. 9 Duquesne	Siegel Center	62–67	NBCSN	250
2	4	1:00 pm	No. 5 UMass vs No. 13 Saint Joseph's	Robins Center	100–66	NBCSN	250
3	5	3:30 pm	No. 7 Dayton vs No. 10 Rhode Island	Siegel Center	82–74	NBCSN	250
3	6	5:30 pm	No. 6 George Mason vs No. 11 George Washington	Robins Center	73–59	NBCSN	250
Quarterfinals – Friday, March 5
4	7	11:00 am	No. 1 St. Bonaventure vs No. 9 Duquesne	Siegel Center	75–57	NBCSN	250
4	8	1:00 pm	No. 4 Saint Louis vs No. 5 UMass	Robins Center	86–72	NBCSN	250
5	9	3:30 pm	No. 2 VCU vs No. 7 Dayton	Siegel Center	73–68	NBCSN	250
5	10	5:30 pm	No. 3 Davidson vs No. 6 George Mason	Robins Center	99–67	NBCSN	250
Semifinals – Saturday, March 6
6	11	6:00 pm	No. 1 St. Bonaventure vs No. 4 Saint Louis	Siegel Center	71–53	CBSSN	250
6	12	9:00 pm	No. 2 VCU vs No. 3 Davidson	Siegel Center	64–52	CBSSN	250
Championship – Sunday, March 14
7	13	1:00 pm	No. 1 St. Bonaventure vs No. 2 VCU	UD Arena	74–65	CBS	1,500

*Game times in Eastern Time.

== Bracket ==
First round Wednesday, March 3 ESPN+
12	La Salle	66
13	Saint Joseph’s	72
11	George Washington	53
14	Fordham	49

Second round Thursday, March 4 NBCSN
8	Richmond	62
9	Duquesne	67
5	UMass	100
13	Saint Joseph's	66
7	Dayton	84
10	Rhode Island	72
6	George Mason	73
11	George Washington	59

Quarterfinals; Friday, March 5 NBCSN
1	St. Bonaventure	75
9	Duquesne	59
4	Saint Louis	86
5	UMass	72
2	VCU	73
7	Dayton	68
3	Davidson	99
6	George Mason	67

Semifinals; Saturday, March 6 CBSSN
1	St. Bonaventure	71
4	Saint Louis	53
2	VCU	64
3	Davidson	52

Championship; Sunday, March 14; CBS
1	St. Bonaventure	74
2	VCU	65

* denotes overtime period
