= 2020–21 George Washington Colonials men's basketball team =

American college basketball season

2020–21 George Washington Colonials men's basketball
- Conference: Atlantic 10 Conference
- Record: 5–12 (3–5 A-10)
- Head coach: Jamion Christian (2nd season)
- Assistant coaches: Eric Atkins; Graham Bousley; Ryan Devlin
- Home arena: Charles E. Smith Center

2020–21 Atlantic 10 men's basketball standings
	Conf.				Overall
Team	W		L	PCT	W		L	PCT
St. Bonaventure†	11	–	4	.733	16	–	5	.762
VCU	10	–	4	.714	19	–	7	.731
Davidson	7	–	4	.636	13	–	9	.591
Saint Louis	6	–	4	.600	14	–	7	.667
UMass	6	–	4	.600	8	–	7	.533
George Mason	8	–	6	.571	13	–	9	.591
Dayton	9	–	7	.563	14	–	10	.583
Richmond	6	–	5	.545	14	–	9	.609
Duquesne	7	–	7	.500	9	–	9	.500
Rhode Island	7	–	10	.412	10	–	15	.400
George Washington	3	–	5	.375	5	–	12	.294
La Salle	6	–	11	.353	9	–	16	.360
Saint Joseph's	3	–	9	.250	5	–	15	.250
Fordham	2	–	11	.154	2	–	12	.143
† 2021 A10 Tournament winner

The 2020–21 George Washington Colonials men's basketball team represented George Washington University during the 2020–21 NCAA Division I men's basketball season. The team was led by second-year head coach Jamion Christian, and played their home games at Charles E. Smith Center in Washington, D.C. as a member of the Atlantic 10 Conference. They finished the season 5-12, 3-5 in A-10 Play to finish in 11th place. They defeated Fordham in the first round of the A-10 tournament before losing in the second round to George Mason.

== Previous season ==
The Colonials finished the 2019–20 season with a 12–20 record and a 6–12 record in Atlantic 10 play. They were eliminated by Fordham in the opening round of the 2020 Atlantic 10 men's basketball tournament.

== Roster ==
2020–21 George Washington Colonials men's basketball team
Players
Coaches

Pos.	#	Name	Height	Weight	Year	Previous school	Hometown
F	0	Matt Moyer	6 ft 9 in (2.06 m)	225 lb (102 kg)	GS	Vanderbilt	Gahanna, Ohio
G	2	Tyler Brelsford	6 ft 4 in (1.93 m)	175 lb (79 kg)	Fr	Mount Saint Joseph High School	Ellicott City, Maryland
F	3	Chase Paar	6 ft 9 in (2.06 m)	245 lb (111 kg)	So	Glenelg Country School	Mount Airy, Maryland
F	4	Ricky Lindo Jr.	6 ft 8 in (2.03 m)	225 lb (102 kg)	Jr	Maryland	Washington, D.C.
G	5	Lincoln Ball	6 ft 6 in (1.98 m)	220 lb (100 kg)	Fr	Williamsport High School	Williamsport, Maryland
F	10	Jamison Battle	6 ft 7 in (2.01 m)	225 lb (102 kg)	So	DeLaSalle High School	Robbinsdale, Minnesota
G	11	James Bishop	6 ft 2 in (1.88 m)	180 lb (82 kg)	So	LSU	Baltimore, Maryland
F	13	Hunter Dean	6 ft 10 in (2.08 m)	245 lb (111 kg)	So	Southern Miss	Mandeville, Louisiana
C	21	Noel Brown	6 ft 11 in (2.11 m)	270 lb (122 kg)	Fr	Flint Hill School	Leesburg, Virginia
G	22	Amir Harris	6 ft 5 in (1.96 m)	210 lb (95 kg)	Jr	Nebraska	Frederick, Maryland
F	23	Sloan Seymour	6 ft 9 in (2.06 m)	215 lb (98 kg)	Jr	Siena	Albany, New York
G	32	Brandon Leftwich	6 ft 3 in (1.91 m)	185 lb (84 kg)	GS	Mount St. Mary's	Brooklyn, New York
F	33	Miles Gally	6 ft 10 in (2.08 m)	210 lb (95 kg)	So	Richard Montgomery High School	Rockville, Maryland

Head coach

- Jamion Christian (Mount St. Mary's)

Assistant coach(es)

- Eric Atkins (Notre Dame)
- Graham Bousley (Wisconsin)
- Ryan Devlin (Pittsburgh)

Legend

- (C) Team captain
- (S) Suspended
- (I) Ineligible
- (W) Walk-on
- Injured
- Current redshirt

Roster
Last update: January 6, 2021

== Schedule and results ==
Date time, TV	Rank^{#}	Opponent^{#}	Result	Record	High points	High rebounds	High assists	Site (attendance) city, state
Non-conference regular season
November 25, 2020*; Noon, CBSSN		at Navy; Veterans Classic	L 71–78	0–1	20 – Battle	10 – Moyer	9 – Bishop	Alumni Hall (87); Annapolis, MD
December 1, 2020*; 8:00 p.m., ESPN+		Hampton	L 78–82	0–2	22 – Bishop	9 – Battle	7 – Bishop	Charles E. Smith Center (0); Washington, D.C.
December 5, 2020*; 2:00 p.m., ESPN+		Coppin State	W 85–69	1–2	20 – Bishop	16 – Paar	9 – Bishop	Charles E. Smith Center (0); Washington, D.C.
December 7, 2020*; 4:00 p.m.		at UMBC	L 81–92	1–3	20 – Bishop	7 – Moyer	6 – Bishop	UMBC Event Center (0); Baltimore, MD
December 11, 2020*; 7:00 p.m., FloHoops		at Delaware	L 65–68	1–4	14 – Tied	12 – Moyer	5 – Bishop	Bob Carpenter Center (0); Newark, DE
December 14, 2020*; 7:00 p.m., ESPN+		William & Mary	L 84–85 ^{OT}	1–5	21 – Bishop	11 – Moyer	5 – Bishop	Charles E. Smith Center (0); Washington, D.C.
December 22, 2020*; 2:00 p.m., ESPN+		Charlotte	L 65–66	1–6	20 – Bishop	9 – Moyer	5 – Bishop	Charles E. Smith Center (0); Washington, D.C.
Atlantic 10 regular season
December 30, 2020; 1:00 p.m., ESPN+		at Fordham	W 71–47	2–6 (1–0)	24 – Battle	8 – Moyer	5 – Bishop	Rose Hill Gymnasium (0); Bronx, NY
January 2, 2021; 12:30 p.m., NBCSN		Duquesne	L 63–75	2–7 (1–1)	21 – Bishop	11 – Moyer	3 – Bishop	Charles E. Smith Center; Washington, D.C.
January 3, 2021; 2:00 p.m., ESPN+		Duquesne	W 75–73	3–7 (2–1)	29 – Battle	15 – Moyer	7 – Bishop	Charles E. Smith Center; Washington, D.C.
January 6, 2021; 6:00 p.m., NBCSW+		UMass	Postponed due to the 2021 United States Capitol attack					Charles E. Smith Center; Washington, D.C.
January 13, 2021; 6:00 p.m., NBCSW+		VCU	L 77–84	3–8 (2–2)	24 – Bishop	12 – Lindo Jr.	3 – Tied	Charles E. Smith Center; Washington, D.C.
January 17, 2021; 4:30 p.m., NBCSN		Dayton	L 54–67	3–9 (2–3)	17 – Bishop	8 – Lindo Jr.	5 – Bishop	Charles E. Smith Center; Washington, D.C.
January 20, 2021; 7:00 p.m., ESPN+		at Dayton	Postponed due to COVID-19 issues					UD Arena; Dayton, OH
January 30, 2021; 2:00 p.m., NBCSW		Fordham	Postponed due to COVID-19 issues					Charles E. Smith Center; Washington, D.C.
February 6, 2021; CBSSN		Saint Louis	Postponed due to COVID-19 issues					Charles E. Smith Center; Washington, D.C.
February 9, 2021; 6:00 p.m., ESPN+		at Richmond	Postponed due to COVID-19 issues					Robins Center; Richmond, VA
February 13, 2021; 2:00 p.m., ESPN+		at La Salle	Postponed due to COVID-19 issues					Tom Gola Arena; Philadelphia, PA
February 17, 2021; 6:00 p.m., NBCSW+		Saint Joseph's	Postponed due to COVID-19 issues					Charles E. Smith Center; Washington, D.C.
February 21, 2021; 11:30 a.m., NBCSN		Rhode Island	W 78–70	4–9 (3–3)	28 – Bishop	10 – Lindo Jr.	4 – Lindo Jr.	Charles E. Smith Center; Washington, D.C.
February 24, 2021; 6:00 p.m., ESPN+		at George Mason	L 58–63	4–10 (3–4)	15 – Bishop	14 – Lindo Jr.	4 – Bishop	EagleBank Arena (250); Fairfax, VA
February 26, 2021; 6:00 pm, ESPN+		at St. Bonaventure	L 41–88	4–11 (3–5)	10 – Battle	4 – Brelsford	2 – Tied	Reilly Center; Olean, NY
A-10 tournament
March 3, 2021; 2:00 pm, ESPN+	(11)	vs. (14) Fordham; First round	W 53–49	5–11	21 – Lindo Jr.	14 – Lindo Jr.	5 – Bishop	Siegel Center (250); Richmond, VA
March 4, 2021; 5:30 pm, NBCSN	(11)	vs. (6) George Mason; Second round	L 59–73	5–12	29 – Bishop	14 – Lindo Jr.	4 – Bishop	Robins Center (250); Richmond, VA
*Non-conference game. ^{#}Rankings from AP Poll. (#) Tournament seedings in parentheses. All times are in Eastern Time.
