= 2020–21 St. Bonaventure Bonnies men's basketball team =

American college basketball season

2020–21 St. Bonaventure Bonnies men's basketball
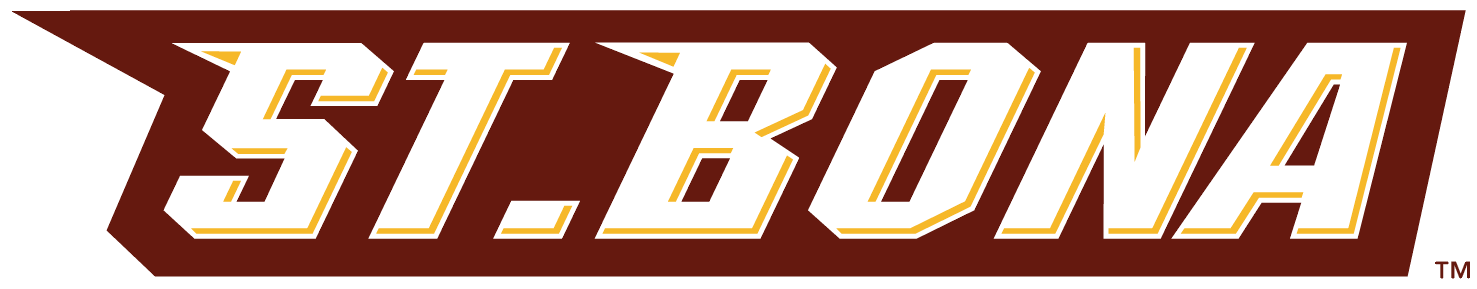

Atlantic 10 regular season and tournament champions

NCAA tournament, First Round
- Conference: Atlantic 10 Conference
- Record: 16–5 (11–4 A–10)
- Head coach: Mark Schmidt (14th season)
- Assistant coaches: Steve Curran; Tray Woodall; Sean Neal
- Home arena: Reilly Center

2020–21 Atlantic 10 men's basketball standings
	Conf.				Overall
Team	W		L	PCT	W		L	PCT
St. Bonaventure†	11	–	4	.733	16	–	5	.762
VCU	10	–	4	.714	19	–	7	.731
Davidson	7	–	4	.636	13	–	9	.591
Saint Louis	6	–	4	.600	14	–	7	.667
UMass	6	–	4	.600	8	–	7	.533
George Mason	8	–	6	.571	13	–	9	.591
Dayton	9	–	7	.563	14	–	10	.583
Richmond	6	–	5	.545	14	–	9	.609
Duquesne	7	–	7	.500	9	–	9	.500
Rhode Island	7	–	10	.412	10	–	15	.400
George Washington	3	–	5	.375	5	–	12	.294
La Salle	6	–	11	.353	9	–	16	.360
Saint Joseph's	3	–	9	.250	5	–	15	.250
Fordham	2	–	11	.154	2	–	12	.143
† 2021 A10 Tournament winner

The 2020–21 St. Bonaventure Bonnies men's basketball team represented St. Bonaventure University during the 2020–21 NCAA Division I men's basketball season. The Bonnies, led by 14th-year head coach Mark Schmidt, played their home games at the Reilly Center in Olean, New York as members of the Atlantic 10 Conference. In a season limited due to the ongoing COVID-19 pandemic, the Bonnies finished the season 16–5, 11–4 in A-10 play to win the regular season A-10 championship. They defeated Duquesne, Saint Louis, and VCU to win the A-10 tournament. As a result, they received the conference's automatic bid to the NCAA tournament as the No. 9 seed in the East region. There they lost to LSU in the first round.

== Previous season ==
The Bonnies finished the 2019–20 season 19–12, 11–7 in A-10 play to finish in a tie for fifth place. Their season ended when the A-10 tournament and all other postseason tournaments were canceled due to the ongoing COVID-19 pandemic.

== Offseason ==
=== Departures ===
Name	Number	Pos.	Height	Weight	Year	Hometown	Reason for departure
Robert Carpenter	2	F	6'8"	215	Freshman	Detroit, MI	Transferred to Pearl River Community College
Matt Johnson	4	G	6'4"	180	Junior	Baltimore, MD	Transferred to Detroit Mercy
Bobby Planudis	10	F	6'8"	190	RS Sophomore	Hazleton, PA	Transferred to Purdue Fort Wayne
Malik Lacewell	23	G	6'2"	160	Freshman	Brooklyn, NY	Transferred to Northwest Kansas Technical College
Amadi Ikpeze	32	C	6'10"	240	Senior	Buffalo, NY	Graduated

=== Incoming transfers ===
Name	Number	Pos.	Height	Weight	Year	Hometown	Previous School
Eddie Creal	2	G	6'4"	210	Junior	Joliet, IL	Junior college transferred from Moberly Area Community College.
Anthony Roberts	4	G	6'4"	190	Junior	Detroit, MI	Transferred from Kent State. Granted transfer waiver and will have immediate eligibility for the 2020–21 season.
Jalen Shaw	40	F/C	6'10"	248	Junior	Elgin, IL	Junior college transferred from Triton College.

=== 2020 recruiting class ===
College recruiting information
Name	Hometown	School	Height	Weight	Commit date
Josh Bell; SG	Frederick, MD	Saint John's Catholic Prep	6 ft 5 in (1.96 m)	190 lb (86 kg)	Jun 5, 2020
Josh Bell; SG	Recruit ratings: Scout: Rivals: (NR)				
Jermaine Taggart; SG	Rochester, NY	McQuaid Jesuit High School	6 ft 3 in (1.91 m)	162 lb (73 kg)	Jun 30, 2020
Jermaine Taggart; SG	Recruit ratings: Scout: Rivals: (NR)				
Overall recruit ranking:
Note: In many cases, Scout, Rivals, 247Sports, On3, and ESPN may conflict in their listings of height and weight.; In these cases, the average was taken. ESPN grades are on a 100-point scale.; Sources: "2020 Team Ranking". Rivals.

== Roster ==
2020–21 St. Bonaventure Bonnies men's basketball team
Players
Coaches

Pos.	#	Name	Height	Weight	Year	Previous school	Hometown
G	0	Kyle Lofton	6 ft 3 in (1.91 m)	190 lb (86 kg)	Jr	Putnam Science Academy	Hillside, New Jersey
G	1	Dominick Welch	6 ft 5 in (1.96 m)	200 lb (91 kg)	Jr	SPIRE Institute	Buffalo, New York
G	2	Eddie Creal	6 ft 4 in (1.93 m)	210 lb (95 kg)	Jr	Moberly Area CC	Joliet, Illinois
G	3	Alpha Okoli	6 ft 5 in (1.96 m)	200 lb (91 kg)	Jr	St. John Bosco High School	Los Angeles, California
G	5	Jaren Holmes	6 ft 4 in (1.93 m)	215 lb (98 kg)	Jr	Ranger College	Romulus, Michigan
G	10	Alejandro Vasquez	6 ft 3 in (1.91 m)	200 lb (91 kg)	So	The Patrick School	Queens, New York
G	11	Josh Bell	6 ft 5 in (1.96 m)	190 lb (86 kg)	Fr	Saint John's Catholic Prep	Frederick, Maryland
F/C	21	Osun Osunniyi	6 ft 10 in (2.08 m)	220 lb (100 kg)	Jr	Putnam Science Academy	Pleasantville, New Jersey
G	23	Jermaine Taggart	6 ft 3 in (1.91 m)	162 lb (73 kg)	Fr	McQuaid Jesuit High School	Rochester, New York
G	33	Jalen Adaway	6 ft 5 in (1.96 m)	210 lb (95 kg)	RS Jr	Miami (OH)	Logansport, Indiana
F/C	40	Jalen Shaw	6 ft 10 in (2.08 m)	248 lb (112 kg)	Jr	Triton College	Elgin, Illinois

Head coach

- Mark Schmidt (Boston College)

Assistant coach(es)

- Steve Curran (Merrimack)
- Dwayne Lee (Saint Joseph's)
- Sean Neal (La Salle)

Legend

- (C) Team captain
- (S) Suspended
- (I) Ineligible
- (W) Walk-on
- Injured
- Current redshirt

Roster

== Schedule and results ==
Date time, TV	Rank^{#}	Opponent^{#}	Result	Record	High points	High rebounds	High assists	Site (attendance) city, state
Non-conference regular season
December 12, 2020*; 7:00 p.m., ESPN+		Saint Francis (PA)	Cancelled due to COVID-19 issues					Reilly Center; Olean, NY
December 15, 2020*; 1:00 p.m., ESPN+		vs. Akron	W 81–74	1–0	25 – Osunniyi	8 – Osunniyi	5 – Lofton	Rocket Mortgage FieldHouse (150); Cleveland, OH
December 19, 2020*; 2:00 p.m., ESPN+		Hofstra	W 77–69	2–0	16 – Lofton	12 – Osunniyi	9 – Lofton	Reilly Center (0); Olean, NY
December 22, 2020*; 7:00 p.m., ESPN+		Buffalo	Cancelled due to COVID-19 issues					Reilly Center; Olean, NY
A-10 regular season
December 30, 2020; 4:00 p.m., ESPN+		at Rhode Island	L 57–63	2–1 (0–1)	13 – Lofton	7 – Welch	4 – Roberts	Ryan Center (0); Kingston, RI
January 2, 2021; 5:00 p.m., CBSSN		at Richmond	W 69–66	3–1 (1–1)	17 – Holmes	13 – Osunniyi	3 – Lofton	Robins Center; Richmond, VA
January 6, 2021; 4:00 p.m., ESPN+		Saint Joseph's	W 83–57	4–1 (2–1)	38 – Holmes	12 – Osunniyi	11 – Lofton	Reilly Center (0); Olean, NY
January 13, 2021; 2:00 p.m., ESPN+		at Fordham	W 68–54	5–1 (3–1)	26 – Holmes	14 – Welch	7 – Osunniyi	Rose Hill Gymnasium; The Bronx, NY
January 16, 2021; 2:00 p.m., ESPN+		Duquesne	W 62–48	6–1 (4–1)	28 – Lofton	12 – Osunniyi	2 – Lofton	Reilly Center (0); Olean, NY
January 20, 2021; 6:00 p.m., CBSSN		VCU	W 70–54	7–1 (5–1)	19 – Welch	9 – Tied	4 – Osunniyi	Reilly Center (0); Olean, NY
January 23, 2021; 7:00 p.m., ESPN+		at Duquesne	W 65–61	8–1 (6–1)	17 – Lofton	10 – Tied	5 – Lofton	Kerr Fitness Center; McCandless, PA
January 30, 2021; 2:00 p.m., CBSSN		George Mason	W 84–67	9–1 (7–1)	22 – Welch	15 – Osunniyi	5 – Lofton	Reilly Center (0); Olean, NY
February 3, 2021; 6:00 p.m., ESPN+		at Saint Joseph's	Postponed due to COVID-19 issues					Hagan Arena; Philadelphia, PA
February 6, 2021; 2:00 p.m., CBSSN		at Saint Louis	L 59–70	9–2 (7–2)	17 – Lofton	8 – Osunniyi	5 – Lofton	Chaifetz Arena; St. Louis, MO
February 10, 2021; 6:00 p.m., ESPN+		La Salle	W 86–73	10–2 (8–2)	20 – Adaway	8 – Tied	8 – Lofton	Reilly Center (0); Olean, NY
February 12, 2021; 7:00 p.m., ESPN2		at VCU	L 64–67	10–3 (8–3)	23 – Adaway	8 – Tied	3 – Tied	Siegel Center (250); Richmond, VA
February 14, 2021; 2:00 p.m., NBCSN		at UMass	Postponed due to COVID-19 issues					Mullins Center; Amherst, MA
February 21, 2021; 3:30 p.m., NBCSN		Davidson	W 69–58	11–3 (9–3)	19 – Holmes	11 – Holmes	6 – Lofton	Reilly Center; Olean, NY
February 24, 2021; 5:00 p.m., ESPN+		at Davidson	W 56–53	12–3 (10–3)	16 – Holmes	8 – Osunniyi	5 – Lofton	John M. Belk Arena; Davidson, NC
February 26, 2021; 6:00 pm, ESPN+		George Washington	W 88–41	13–3 (11–3)	18 – Tied	8 – Osunniyi	10 – Lofton	Reilly Center; Olean, NY
March 1, 2021; 5:00 pm, ESPNU		Dayton	L 52–55	13–4 (11–4)	17 – Adaway	15 – Osunniyi	6 – Lofton	Reilly Center; Olean, NY
A-10 tournament
March 5, 2021; 11:00 am, NBCSN	(1)	vs. (9) Duquesne; Quarterfinals	W 75–59	14–4	18 – Tied	14 – Osunniyi	6 – Osunniyi	Siegel Center (250); Richmond, VA
March 6, 2021; 6:00 pm, CBSSN	(1)	vs. (4) Saint Louis; Semifinals	W 71–53	15–4	17 – Adaway	10 – Lofton	6 – Lofton	Siegel Center (250); Richmond, VA
March 14, 2021; 1:00 pm, CBS	(1)	vs. (2) VCU; Championship	W 74–65	16–4	23 – Lofton	12 – Osunniyi	6 – Lofton	UD Arena (1,500); Dayton, OH
NCAA tournament
March 20, 2021; 1:45 pm, TNT	(9 E)	vs. (8 E) LSU; First Round	L 61–76	16–5	18 – English	9 – Osunniyi	5 – Lofton	Simon Skjodt Assembly Hall; Bloomington, IN
*Non-conference game. ^{#}Rankings from AP Poll. (#) Tournament seedings in parentheses. All times are in Eastern Time.
