= 2020–21 Saint Joseph's Hawks men's basketball team =

American college basketball season

2020–21 Saint Joseph's Hawks men's basketball
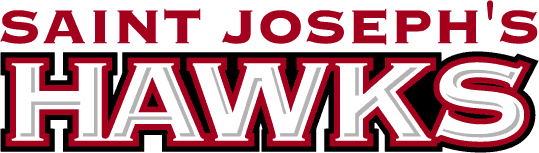
- Conference: Atlantic 10 Conference
- Record: 5–15 (3–9 A-10)
- Head coach: Billy Lange (2nd season)
- Assistant coaches: John Griffin III; Justin Scott; Brenden Straughn
- Home arena: Hagan Arena

2020–21 Atlantic 10 men's basketball standings
	Conf.				Overall
Team	W		L	PCT	W		L	PCT
St. Bonaventure†	11	–	4	.733	16	–	5	.762
VCU	10	–	4	.714	19	–	7	.731
Davidson	7	–	4	.636	13	–	9	.591
Saint Louis	6	–	4	.600	14	–	7	.667
UMass	6	–	4	.600	8	–	7	.533
George Mason	8	–	6	.571	13	–	9	.591
Dayton	9	–	7	.563	14	–	10	.583
Richmond	6	–	5	.545	14	–	9	.609
Duquesne	7	–	7	.500	9	–	9	.500
Rhode Island	7	–	10	.412	10	–	15	.400
George Washington	3	–	5	.375	5	–	12	.294
La Salle	6	–	11	.353	9	–	16	.360
Saint Joseph's	3	–	9	.250	5	–	15	.250
Fordham	2	–	11	.154	2	–	12	.143
† 2021 A10 Tournament winner

The 2020–21 Saint Joseph's Hawks basketball team represented Saint Joseph's University during the 2020–21 NCAA Division I men's basketball season. The Hawks, led by second-year head coach Billy Lange, played their home games at Hagan Arena in Philadelphia, Pennsylvania as members of the Atlantic 10 Conference. They finished the season 5-15, 3-9 in A-10 Play to finish in 13th place. They defeated La Salle in the first round of the A-10 tournament before losing in the second round to UMass.

== Previous season ==
The previous season was the first season without longtime head coach, Phil Martelli since 1994. The Hawks finished the 2018–19 season 6–26 overall, 2–16 in A-10 play to finish in a tie for 13th place. As the No. 13 seed in the A-10 tournament, they played against the No. 12 seed, George Mason in the opening round, where they lost 70–77. Their season record-wise, was their poorest since the 1974–75 season.

== Offseason ==
=== 2020 recruiting class ===
College recruiting information
Name	Hometown	School	Height	Weight	Commit date
Jordan Hall; SF	Philadelphia, PA	Neumann-Goretti High School	6 ft 7 in (2.01 m)	N/A	Jun 25, 2019
Jordan Hall; SF	Recruit ratings: Scout: Rivals: 247Sports: ESPN: (NR)				
Anton Jansson; C	Napa, CA	Golden State Prep	6 ft 10 in (2.08 m)	230 lb (100 kg)	Nov 15, 2019
Anton Jansson; C	Recruit ratings: Scout: Rivals: 247Sports: ESPN: (NR)				
Overall recruit ranking:
Note: In many cases, Scout, Rivals, 247Sports, On3, and ESPN may conflict in their listings of height and weight.; In these cases, the average was taken. ESPN grades are on a 100-point scale.; Sources: "Saint Joseph's Hawks". ESPN.; "2020 Team Ranking". Rivals.

=== 2021 recruiting class ===
College recruiting information
Name	Hometown	School	Height	Weight	Commit date
Erik Reynolds; SG	Potomac, MD	Bullis School	6 ft 2 in (1.88 m)	170 lb (77 kg)	Aug 29, 2020
Erik Reynolds; SG	Recruit ratings: Scout: Rivals: 247Sports: ESPN: (79)				
Overall recruit ranking:
Note: In many cases, Scout, Rivals, 247Sports, On3, and ESPN may conflict in their listings of height and weight.; In these cases, the average was taken. ESPN grades are on a 100-point scale.; Sources: "Saint Joseph's Hawks". ESPN.; "2020 Team Ranking". Rivals.

== Preseason ==
=== A10 media poll ===
The Atlantic 10 men's basketball media poll was released on November 9, 2020. Saint Joseph's was picked to finish 12th.

A10 Preseason Poll
Predicted finish	Team
1	Richmond (19)
2	Saint Louis (7)
3	Dayton (2)
4	St. Bonaventure
5	Duquesne
6	Rhode Island
7	Davidson
8	UMass
9	VCU
10	George Mason
11	George Washington
12	Saint Joseph's
13	La Salle
14	Fordham

== Roster ==
2020–21 Saint Joseph's Hawks men's basketball team
Players
Coaches

Pos.	#	Name	Height	Weight	Year	Previous school	Hometown
G	0	Dahmir Bishop	6 ft 5 in (1.96 m)	190 lb (86 kg)	So	Xavier	Philadelphia, Pennsylvania
G	1	Ryan Daly	6 ft 5 in (1.96 m)	225 lb (102 kg)	RS Sr	Delaware	Havertown, Pennsylvania
F	2	Myles Douglas	6 ft 7 in (2.01 m)	215 lb (98 kg)	Jr	UCF	Edgewood, Maryland
G	3	Cameron Brown	6 ft 5 in (1.96 m)	220 lb (100 kg)	So	Eleanor Roosevelt High School	Laurel, Maryland
G	5	Greg Foster Jr.	6 ft 5 in (1.96 m)	200 lb (91 kg)	RS So	Gonzaga	Milwaukee, Wisconsin
C	10	Anton Jansson	6 ft 11 in (2.11 m)	235 lb (107 kg)	Fr	Golden State Prep	Stockholm, Sweden
G	11	Rahmir Moore	6 ft 3 in (1.91 m)	205 lb (93 kg)	So	RISE Prep	Philadelphia, Pennsylvania
F	12	Anthony Longpré	6 ft 10 in (2.08 m)	250 lb (113 kg)	Sr	Glenelg Country School	L'Assomption, Quebec
F	13	Jadrian Tracey	6 ft 5 in (1.96 m)	205 lb (93 kg)	Fr	West Oaks Academy	Fort Myers, Florida
G	20	Chris Arizin	6 ft 3 in (1.91 m)	195 lb (88 kg)	Fr	St. Joseph's Prep	Media, Pennsylvania
G	21	Nikkos Luna-Nash	6 ft 0 in (1.83 m)	155 lb (70 kg)	Fr	Shorecrest Prep	Seminole, Florida
G/F	22	Jordan Hall	6 ft 8 in (2.03 m)	210 lb (95 kg)	Fr	Neumann Goretti High School	Wildwood, New Jersey
G	24	Jack Forrest	6 ft 5 in (1.96 m)	200 lb (91 kg)	So	Columbia	Bala Cynwyd, Pennsylvania
G	30	Brian Geatens	6 ft 0 in (1.83 m)	175 lb (79 kg)	Fr	St. Joseph's Prep	Harleysville, Pennsylvania
F	33	Taylor Funk	6 ft 8 in (2.03 m)	215 lb (98 kg)	RS Jr	Manheim Central High School	Lancaster, Pennsylvania
G	34	Ethan Griffith	6 ft 3 in (1.91 m)	190 lb (86 kg)	Sr	Hillsborough High School	Hillsborough, New Jersey

Head coach

- Billy Lange (Rowan)

Assistant coach(es)

- John Griffin III (Bucknell)
- Justin Scott (East Stroudsburg)
- Brenden Straughn (Hood)

Legend

- (C) Team captain
- (S) Suspended
- (I) Ineligible
- (W) Walk-on
- Injured
- Current redshirt

Roster
Last update: April 17, 2021

== Schedule ==
Date time, TV	Rank^{#}	Opponent^{#}	Result	Record	High points	High rebounds	High assists	Site (attendance) city, state
Regular season
November 26, 2020*; 3:30 p.m., FS1		vs. Auburn; Fort Myers Tip-Off semifinals	L 91–96 ^{OT}	0–1	28 – Funk	7 – Funk	7 – Daly	Suncoast Credit Union Arena (198); Fort Myers, FL
November 27, 2020*; 1:00 p.m., FS1		vs. No. 6 Kansas; Fort Myers Tip-Off third place game	L 72–94	0–2	18 – Forrest	7 – Daly	5 – Hall	Suncoast Credit Union Arena (310); Fort Myers, FL
December 5, 2020*; 3:00 p.m.		at Bradley	Postponed due to COVID-19 issues					Carver Arena; Peoria, IL
December 12, 2020*; 3:00 p.m., NBCSN		Temple; Temple rivalry	Postponed due to COVID-19 issues					Hagan Arena; Philadelphia, PA
December 17, 2020*; 6:00 p.m., NBCSPHI		at Drexel; City 6	L 77–81	0–3	30 – Daly	8 – Funk	4 – Hall	Daskalakis Center (0); Philadelphia, PA
December 19, 2020*; 2:00 p.m., FS1		at No. 7 Villanova; Holy War	L 68–88	0–4	17 – Hall	6 – Hall	6 – Hall	Finneran Pavilion (0); Philadelphia, PA
December 21, 2020*; 6:00 p.m., SECN		at No. 8 Tennessee	L 66–102	0–5	13 – Daly	7 – Daly	3 – Daly	Thompson–Boling Arena (4,191); Knoxville, TN
December 30, 2020; 12:00 p.m., ESPN+		VCU	L 64–80	0–6 (0–1)	20 – Bishop	8 – Brown	7 – Hall	Hagan Arena (0); Philadelphia, PA
January 3, 2021; 4:30 p.m., NBCSN		at Rhode Island	L 77–85 ^{OT}	0–7 (0–2)	29 – Funk	8 – Hall	8 – Hall	Ryan Center (0); Kingston, RI
January 6, 2021; 4:00 p.m., ESPN+		at St. Bonaventure	L 57–83	0–8 (0–3)	13 – Funk	10 – Hall	5 – Hall	Reilly Center (0); Olean, NY
January 9, 2021*; 6:00 p.m., NBCSN		Albany	W 67–64	1–8	14 – Funk	6 – Funk	9 – Hall	Hagan Arena (0); Philadelphia, PA
January 12, 2021; 7:00 p.m., ESPN+		at Davidson	L 66–80	1–9 (0–4)	19 – Forrest	7 – Hall	6 – Hall	Belk Arena (0); Davidson, NC
January 18, 2021; 4:00 p.m., CBSSN		at La Salle; Big 5	L 83–90	1–10 (0–5)	25 – Forrest	7 – Hall	11 – Hall	Gola Arena (0); Philadelphia, PA
January 20, 2021; 7:00 p.m., ESPN+		at George Mason	L 85–87 ^{OT}	1–11 (0–6)	19 – Funk	9 – Funk	11 – Hall	EagleBank Arena (180); Fairfax, VA
January 23, 2021; 12:30 p.m., NBCSN		George Mason	L 61–72	1–12 (0–7)	21 – Funk	7 – Hall	7 – Hall	Hagan Arena (0); Philadelphia, PA
January 26, 2021; 6:00 p.m., ESPN+		Richmond	L 56–79	1–13 (0–8)	17 – Hall	5 – Tracey	3 – Hall	Hagan Arena (0); Philadelphia, PA
January 30, 2021; 8:00 p.m., ESPN+		at Duquesne	L 50–67	1–14 (0–9)	15 – Funk	11 – Tracey	4 – Moore	Kerr Fitness Center; McCandless, PA
February 3, 2021; 6:00 p.m., ESPN+		St. Bonaventure	Postponed due to COVID-19 issues					Hagan Arena; Philadelphia, PA
February 17, 2021; 6:00 p.m., ESPN+		at George Washington	Postponed due to COVID-19 issues					Smith Center; Washington, DC
February 20, 2021; 12:30 p.m., NBCSN		La Salle; Big 5	W 91–82 ^{OT}	2–14 (1–9)	30 – Daly	12 – Hall	10 – Hall	Hagan Arena; Philadelphia, PA
February 24, 2021; 6:00 p.m., ESPN+		Dayton	W 97–84	3–14 (2–9)	36 – Funk	8 – Moore	5 – Tied	Hagan Arena; Philadelphia, PA
March 1, 2021; 6:00 pm, ESPN+		at Richmond	W 76–73	4–14 (3–9)	22 – Funk	10 – Hall	3 – Daly	Robins Center; Richmond, VA
A-10 tournament
March 3, 2021; 11:00 am, ESPN+	(13)	vs. (12) La Salle; First round	W 72–66	5–14	23 – Daly	7 – Tied	2 – Tied	Siegel Center (250); Richmond, VA
March 4, 2021; 1:00 pm, NBCSN	(13)	vs. (5) Massachusetts; Second round	L 66–100	5–15	18 – Hall	7 – Brown	5 – Hall	Robins Center (250); Richmond, VA
*Non-conference game. ^{#}Rankings from AP Poll. (#) Tournament seedings in parentheses. All times are in Eastern Time.
