= 2020–21 Fordham Rams men's basketball team =

2020–21 Fordham Rams men's basketball
- Conference: Atlantic 10
- Record: 2–12 (2–11 A-10)
- Head coach: Jeff Neubauer (6th season) (fired 1/26) (interim, 1st season); Mike DePaoli
- Assistant coaches: Anthony Evans; Dennis Felton
- Home arena: Rose Hill Gymnasium

2020–21 Atlantic 10 men's basketball standings
	Conf.				Overall
Team	W		L	PCT	W		L	PCT
St. Bonaventure†	11	–	4	.733	16	–	5	.762
VCU	10	–	4	.714	19	–	7	.731
Davidson	7	–	4	.636	13	–	9	.591
Saint Louis	6	–	4	.600	14	–	7	.667
UMass	6	–	4	.600	8	–	7	.533
George Mason	8	–	6	.571	13	–	9	.591
Dayton	9	–	7	.563	14	–	10	.583
Richmond	6	–	5	.545	14	–	9	.609
Duquesne	7	–	7	.500	9	–	9	.500
Rhode Island	7	–	10	.412	10	–	15	.400
George Washington	3	–	5	.375	5	–	12	.294
La Salle	6	–	11	.353	9	–	16	.360
Saint Joseph's	3	–	9	.250	5	–	15	.250
Fordham	2	–	11	.154	2	–	12	.143
† 2021 A10 Tournament winner

The 2020–21 Fordham Rams men's basketball team represented Fordham University during the 2020–21 NCAA Division I men's basketball season. The Rams, led by sixth-year head coach Jeff Neubauer, played their home games at Rose Hill Gymnasium in The Bronx, New York as a member of the Atlantic 10 Conference. They finished the season 2–12, 2–11 in A-10 Play to finish in last place. They lost in the first round of the A-10 tournament to George Washington.

== Previous season ==
The Rams finished the 2019–20 season 9–22, 2–16 in A-10 play to finish in last place. They defeated George Washington in the first round of the Atlantic 10 tournament and were set to take on Duquesne in the second round before the remainder of the Atlantic 10 Tournament was cancelled amid the COVID-19 pandemic.

=== Departures ===
Name	Number	Pos.	Height	Weight	Year	Hometown	Reason for departure
Erten Gazi	4	G	6'3"	205	RS Senior	Güzelyurt, Cyprus	Graduated
Luka Radovich	12	F	6'5"	200	Sophomore	Cresskill, NJ	Walk-on; transferred to Ithaca College
Antwon Portley	13	G	6'4"	195	RS Senior	Lancaster, TX	Graduated
Alec Rodriguez	25	G	5'10"	170	Freshman	Miami, FL	Walk-on; transferred

=== 2020 recruiting class ===
College recruiting information
Name	Hometown	School	Height	Weight	Commit date
Julian Dozier; PG	Putnam, CT	Putnam Science Academy	5 ft 9 in (1.75 m)	170 lb (77 kg)	Nov 27, 2019
Julian Dozier; PG	Recruit ratings: Scout: Rivals: (0)				
Yame Butler; SG	Greenbelt, MD	Fork Union Military Academy	6 ft 3 in (1.91 m)	190 lb (86 kg)	Apr 4, 2020
Yame Butler; SG	Recruit ratings: Scout: Rivals: (0)				
Overall recruit ranking:
Note: In many cases, Scout, Rivals, 247Sports, On3, and ESPN may conflict in their listings of height and weight.; In these cases, the average was taken. ESPN grades are on a 100-point scale.; Sources: "2020 Team Ranking". Rivals.

== Roster ==
2020–21 Fordham Rams men's basketball team
Players
Coaches

Pos.	#	Name	Height	Weight	Year	Previous school	Hometown
G	0	Cameron Cohn	6 ft 4 in (1.93 m)	175 lb (79 kg)	So	Second Baptist School	Houston, Texas
F	1	Chuba Ohams	6 ft 9 in (2.06 m)	210 lb (95 kg)	RS Sr	Wadleigh High School	Bronx, New York
G	2	Jalen Cobb	6 ft 1 in (1.85 m)	165 lb (75 kg)	Jr	Columbia High School	Atlanta, Georgia
G	3	Kyle Rose	6 ft 3 in (1.91 m)	185 lb (84 kg)	So	Eleanor Roosevelt	Upper Marlboro, Maryland
G	4	Julian Dozier	5 ft 10 in (1.78 m)	170 lb (77 kg)	Fr	Putnam Science Academy	Detroit, Michigan
G	5	Chris Austin	6 ft 4 in (1.93 m)	205 lb (93 kg)	So	Maranatha High School	Pasadena, California
G	10	Ty Perry	6 ft 3 in (1.91 m)	215 lb (98 kg)	Jr	Woodstock Academy	Boston, Massachusetts
G	13	Yame Butler	6 ft 5 in (1.96 m)	190 lb (86 kg)	Fr	Fork Union Military Academy	Greenbelt, Maryland
G	14	Albe Evans (W)	5 ft 11 in (1.8 m)	160 lb (73 kg)	Fr	Schuylkill Haven High School	Schuylkill Haven, Pennsylvania
G	15	Mason Williams (W)	6 ft 4 in (1.93 m)	184 lb (83 kg)	Jr	William Penn Charter School	Voorhees, New Jersey
F	20	Ivan Raut	6 ft 7 in (2.01 m)	204 lb (93 kg)	Sr	JU Gimnazija Kotor	Kotor, Montenegro
G	21	Josh Colon	5 ft 10 in (1.78 m)	170 lb (77 kg)	Sr	Salt Lake Community College	Carolina, Puerto Rico
F	22	Joel Soriano	6 ft 11 in (2.11 m)	250 lb (113 kg)	So	St. Thomas More School	Yonkers, New York
G	23	Lazar Skoric	6 ft 3 in (1.91 m)	190 lb (86 kg)	Jr	Sportska Gimnazija	Belgrade, Serbia
F	30	Onyi Eyisi	6 ft 9 in (2.06 m)	225 lb (102 kg)	Jr	Prolific Prep Academy	Napa Valley, California
G	45	Peter Burquest	6 ft 1 in (1.85 m)	165 lb (75 kg)	Sr	St. Xavier High School	Cincinnati, Ohio

Head coach

- Jeff Neubauer (La Salle)
- Michael DePaoli (College of Saint Rose) (interim)

Assistant coach(es)

- Anthony Evans (St. Thomas Aquinas)
- Dennis Felton (Howard)

Legend

- (C) Team captain
- (S) Suspended
- (I) Ineligible
- (W) Walk-on
- Injured
- Current redshirt

Roster
Last update: March 20, 2021

== Schedule and results ==
Date time, TV	Rank^{#}	Opponent^{#}	Result	Record	Site (attendance) city, state
Non-conference regular season
Nov 25, 2020*; TBD, ESPN+		Iona	Canceled due to Covid-19 issues		Rose Hill Gymnasium; Bronx, NY
Dec 3, 2020*; 6:00 pm		at Manhattan; Battle of the Bronx	Canceled due to Covid-19 issues		Draddy Gymnasium; Riverdale, NY
Dec 8, 2020*; 7:00 pm, CBSSN		at St. John's; Rivalry	Canceled due to Covid-19 issues		Carnesecca Arena; Queens, NY
Dec 12, 2020*; 1:00 pm, ESPN+		Maine	Canceled due to Covid-19 issues		Rose Hill Gymnasium; Bronx, NY
Dec 19, 2020*; 1:00 pm, ESPN+		Central Connecticut	Cancelled		Rose Hill Gymnasium; Bronx, NY
Dec 22, 2020*; 1:00 pm, ESPN+		Stony Brook	Cancelled		Rose Hill Gymnasium; Bronx, NY
Atlantic 10 regular season
Dec 30, 2020; 1:00 pm, ESPN+		George Washington	L 47–71	0–1 (0–1)	Rose Hill Gymnasium (0); Bronx, NY
Jan 2, 2021; 6:30 pm, NBCSN		at La Salle	L 52–89	0–2 (0–2)	Tom Gola Arena (0); Philadelphia, PA
Jan 5, 2021; 6:00 pm, ESPN+		Dayton	W 55–54	1–2 (1–2)	Rose Hill Gymnasium (0); Bronx, NY
Jan 9, 2021; 2:00 pm, NBCSN		at Duquesne	L 45–48	1–3 (1–3)	Kerr Fitness Center (0); Pittsburgh, PA
Jan 13, 2021; 2:00 pm, ESPN+		St. Bonaventure	L 54–68	1–4 (1–4)	Rose Hill Gymnasium (0); Bronx, NY
Jan 17, 2021; 2:30 pm, NBCSN		Massachusetts	L 46–65	1–5 (1–5)	Rose Hill Gymnasium (0); Bronx, NY
Jan 20, 2021; 1:00 pm, ESPN+		at Davidson	L 58–73	1–6 (1–6)	John M. Belk Arena (0); Davidson, NC
Jan 24, 2021; 2:30 pm, NBCSN		at Rhode Island	L 42–52	1–7 (1–7)	Ryan Center; Kingston, RI
Jan 27, 2021; 6:00 pm, ESPN+		Duquesne	L 62–86	1–8 (1–8)	Rose Hill Gymnasium; Bronx, NY
Jan 30, 2021; 2:00 pm, ESPN+		at George Washington	Postponed due to Covid-19 issues		Charles E. Smith Center; Washington, D.C.
Jan 31, 2021; 5:00 pm, ESPN+		at VCU	Postponed due to Covid-19 issues		Siegel Center; Richmond, VA
Feb 3, 2021; 6:00 pm, ESPN+		at Massachusetts	L 54–60	1–9 (1–9)	Mullins Center; Amherst, MA
Feb 6, 2021; 1:00 pm, ESPN+		Davidson	Postponed due to Covid-19 issues		Rose Hill Gymnasium; Bronx, NY
Feb 6, 2021; 12:30 pm, NBCSN		La Salle	W 76–68	2–9 (2–9)	Rose Hill Gymnasium; Bronx, NY
Feb 10, 2021; 7:00 pm, ESPN+		at George Mason	L 45–77	2–10 (2–10)	EagleBank Arena; Fairfax, VA
Feb 13, 2021; 3:30 pm, CBSSN		Saint Louis	L 40–68	2–11 (2–11)	Rose Hill Gymnasium; Bronx, NY
Feb 23, 2021; 1:00 pm, ESPN+		at Richmond	Postponed due to Covid-19 issues		Robins Center; Richmond, VA
Feb 27, 2021; 1:00 pm, ESPN+		Saint Joseph's	Postponed due to Covid-19 issues		Rose Hill Gymnasium; Bronx, NY
Mar 3, 2021; 2:00 pm, ESPN+		La Salle	Postponed due to Covid-19 issues		Rose Hill Gymnasium; Bronx, NY
Atlantic 10 tournament
Mar 3, 2021; 2:00 pm, ESPN+	(14)	vs. (11) George Washington; First round	L 49–53	2–12	Siegel Center; Richmond, VA
*Non-conference game. ^{#}Rankings from AP Poll. (#) Tournament seedings in parentheses. All times are in Eastern Time.

== See also ==
- 2020–21 Fordham Rams women's basketball team
