= 2020–21 UMass Minutemen basketball team =

American college basketball season

2020–21 UMass Minutemen basketball
- Conference: Atlantic 10 Conference
- Record: 8–7 (6–4 A–10)
- Head coach: Matt McCall (4th season)
- Assistant coaches: Tyson Wheeler; Tony Bergeron; Lucious Jordan
- Home arena: Mullins Center

2020–21 Atlantic 10 men's basketball standings
| | Conf. | | | | Overall |
| Team | W | | L | PCT | W | | L | PCT |
|---|---|---|---|---|---|---|---|---|
| St. Bonaventure† | 11 | – | 4 | .733 | 16 | – | 5 | .762 |
| VCU | 10 | – | 4 | .714 | 19 | – | 7 | .731 |
| Davidson | 7 | – | 4 | .636 | 13 | – | 9 | .591 |
| Saint Louis | 6 | – | 4 | .600 | 14 | – | 7 | .667 |
| UMass | 6 | – | 4 | .600 | 8 | – | 7 | .533 |
| George Mason | 8 | – | 6 | .571 | 13 | – | 9 | .591 |
| Dayton | 9 | – | 7 | .563 | 14 | – | 10 | .583 |
| Richmond | 6 | – | 5 | .545 | 14 | – | 9 | .609 |
| Duquesne | 7 | – | 7 | .500 | 9 | – | 9 | .500 |
| Rhode Island | 7 | – | 10 | .412 | 10 | – | 15 | .400 |
| George Washington | 3 | – | 5 | .375 | 5 | – | 12 | .294 |
| La Salle | 6 | – | 11 | .353 | 9 | – | 16 | .360 |
| Saint Joseph's | 3 | – | 9 | .250 | 5 | – | 15 | .250 |
| Fordham | 2 | – | 11 | .154 | 2 | – | 12 | .143 |
† 2021 A10 Tournament winner

The 2020–21 UMass Minutemen basketball team represented the University of Massachusetts Amherst during the 2020–21 NCAA Division I men's basketball season. The Minutemen were led by fourth-year head coach Matt McCall and played their home games at the William D. Mullins Memorial Center in Amherst, Massachusetts as members of the Atlantic 10 Conference. They finished the season 8–7, 6–4 in A-10 Play to finish in 5th place. They defeated Saint Joseph’s in the second round of the A-10 tournament before losing in the quarterfinals to Saint Louis.

== Previous season ==
The Minutemen finished the 2019–20 season 14–17, 8–10 in A-10 play to finish in eighth place. Their season ended when the A-10 tournament and all other postseason tournaments were canceled due to the ongoing coronavirus pandemic.

=== Departures ===
| Name | Number | Pos. | Height | Weight | Year | Hometown | Reason for departure |
|---|---|---|---|---|---|---|---|
| John Buggs | 0 | G | 6' 2“ | 185 | Freshman | Homer, LA | Entered transfer portal; missed final 27 games of previous season due to torn ACL. |
| Sy Chatman | 1 | F | 6' 8“ | 200 | Sophomore | Saint Paul, MN | Transferred to Illinois State |
| C.J. Jackson | 3 | G/F | 6'6" | 185 | Freshman | Atlanta, GA | Transferred to Florida SouthWestern State College |
| Keon Clergeot | 4 | G | 6'1“ | 185 | Junior | Winter Haven, FL | Transferred to Southeastern Louisiana |
| Samba Diallo | 5 | F | 6'7“ | 195 | Sophomore | Rufisque, Senegal | Transferred to Manhattan |
| Sean East II | 10 | G | 6'3“ | 185 | Freshman | Louisville, KY | Transferred to Bradley |
| Djery Baptiste | 11 | C | 6' 10“ | 245 | RS Senior | Gonaives, Haiti | Graduated |
| Davonté Higginbottom | 20 | G | 6'1“ | 175 | Senior | Mattapan, MA | Graduated |
| Randall West | 31 | F | 6'4" | 220 | Senior | Moorestown, NJ | Graduated |

=== Incoming transfers ===
| Name | Number | Pos. | Height | Weight | Year | Hometown | Previous School |
|---|---|---|---|---|---|---|---|
| Mark Gasperini | 10 | C | 6'10" | 255 | Graduate Student | Moscow, Russia | Graduate transfer from American |
| Noah Fernandes | 11 | G | 5'11" | 175 | Sophomore | Mattapoisett, MA | Transferred from Wichita State. NCAA transfer rules mandate that he sit out 2020-21, but he was granted a legislative relief waiver and was therefore immediately eligible for the 2020-21 season. |

=== 2020 recruiting class ===
College recruiting information
| Name | Hometown | School | Height | Weight | Commit date |
|---|---|---|---|---|---|
| Dyondre Dominguez #4 F | Providence, RI | Woodstock Academy | 6 ft 8 in (2.03 m) | 205 lb (93 kg) | Feb 29, 2020 |
| Dyondre Dominguez #4 F | Recruit ratings: Scout: Rivals: 247Sports: ESPN: | | | | |
| Ronnie DeGray III #13 F | Parker, CO | Woodstock Academy | 6 ft 7 in (2.01 m) | 220 lb (100 kg) | Apr 6, 2020 |
| Ronnie DeGray III #13 F | Recruit ratings: Scout: Rivals: 247Sports: ESPN: | | | | |
| Javohn Garcia #1 G | Pickerington, OH | Brewster Academy | 6 ft 2 in (1.88 m) | 180 lb (82 kg) | Oct 18, 2019 |
| Javohn Garcia #1 G | Recruit ratings: Scout: Rivals: 247Sports: ESPN: | | | | |
| Cairo McCrory #5 G | Hartford, CT | Woodstock Academy | 6 ft 5 in (1.96 m) | 190 lb (86 kg) | Aug 2, 2019 |
| Cairo McCrory #5 G | Recruit ratings: Scout: Rivals: 247Sports: ESPN: | | | | |
| Ryan Marcus #20 G | Wakefield, MA | Wakefield Memorial | 6 ft 3 in (1.91 m) | 185 lb (84 kg) | N/A |
| Ryan Marcus #20 G | Recruit ratings: Scout: Rivals: 247Sports: ESPN: | | | | |
Overall recruit ranking:
Note: In many cases, Scout, Rivals, 247Sports, On3, and ESPN may conflict in their listings of height and weight.; In these cases, the average was taken. ESPN grades are on a 100-point scale.; Sources: "2020 Team Ranking". Rivals.

== Roster ==
2020–21 UMass Minutemen men's basketball team
Players
Coaches

| Pos. | # | Name | Height | Weight | Year | Previous school | Hometown |
|---|---|---|---|---|---|---|---|
| G | 0 | Brady Antonopoulos (W) | 6 ft 1 in (1.85 m) | 165 lb (75 kg) | Sr | Quaboag Regional HS | West Brookfield, MA |
| G | 1 | Javohn Garcia | 6 ft 2 in (1.88 m) | 180 lb (82 kg) | Fr | Brewster Academy | Pickerington, OH |
| G/F | 2 | Preston Santos | 6 ft 6 in (1.98 m) | 185 lb (84 kg) | So | Woodstock Academy | Providence, RI |
| G | 3 | Kolton Mitchell | 6 ft 3 in (1.91 m) | 185 lb (84 kg) | So | Victory Rock Prep | Fort Myers, FL |
| F | 4 | Dyondre Dominguez | 6 ft 8 in (2.03 m) | 205 lb (93 kg) | Fr | Woodstock Academy | Providence, RI |
| G | 5 | Cairo McCrory | 6 ft 5 in (1.96 m) | 190 lb (86 kg) | Fr | Woodstock Academy | Hartford, CT |
| C | 10 | Mark Gasperini | 6 ft 10 in (2.08 m) | 255 lb (116 kg) | GS | Brimmer and May; American | Moscow, Russia |
| G | 11 | Noah Fernandes | 5 ft 11 in (1.8 m) | 175 lb (79 kg) | So | Woodstock Academy; Wichita State | Mattapoisett, MA |
| G | 12 | Carl Pierre | 6 ft 4 in (1.93 m) | 190 lb (86 kg) | Sr | Boston College HS | Boston, MA |
| F | 13 | Ronnie DeGray III | 6 ft 7 in (2.01 m) | 220 lb (100 kg) | Fr | Woodstock Academy | Parker, CO |
| G | 20 | Ryan Marcus | 6 ft 3 in (1.91 m) | 185 lb (84 kg) | Fr | Wakefield Memorial HS | Wakefield, MA |
| G | 23 | T.J. Weeks | 6 ft 4 in (1.93 m) | 185 lb (84 kg) | RS Fr | Bishop Hendricken Catholic HS; Woodstock Academy | Warwick, RI |
| F | 24 | Dibaji Walker | 6 ft 9 in (2.06 m) | 200 lb (91 kg) | Jr | Woodstock Academy; Cleveland State | Columbus, OH |
| C | 33 | Tre Mitchell | 6 ft 9 in (2.06 m) | 240 lb (109 kg) | So | Woodstock Academy | Pittsburgh, PA |

Head coach

- Matt McCall (Chattanooga)

Assistant coach(es)

- Tony Bergeron (Woodstock Academy)
- Tyson Wheeler (Fairfield)
- Lucious Jordan (Albany)

Legend

- (C) Team captain
- (S) Suspended
- (I) Ineligible
- (W) Walk-on
- Injured
- Current redshirt

Roster

== Schedule and results ==
| Date time, TV | Rank^{#} | Opponent^{#} | Result | Record | Site (attendance) city, state |
Non-conference regular season
| December 11, 2020*; 1:30 pm, NESN | | Northeastern | W 94–79 | 1–0 | Mullins Center; Amherst, MA |
| December 13, 2020*; 12:00 pm, NESN | | at Northeastern | L 75–78 | 1–1 | Cabot Center; Boston, MA |
| December 21, 2020*; 4:00 pm, NESN | | Bryant | L 88–93 | 1–2 | Mullins Center; Amherst, MA |
A-10 regular season
| December 16, 2020; 1:00 pm, ESPN+ | | at La Salle | W 85–66 | 2–2 (1–0) | Tom Gola Arena; Philadelphia, PA |
| December 30, 2020; 6:00 pm, ESPN+ | | George Mason | L 92–93 ^{2OT} | 2–3 (1–1) | Mullins Center; Amherst, MA |
| January 6, 2021; 6:00 pm, ESPN+ | | at George Washington; Postponed due to the 2021 United States Capitol attack | | | Charles E. Smith Center; Washington, D.C. |
| January 9, 2021; 4:00 pm, NBCSN | | La Salle | W 80–78 | 3–3 (2–1) | Mullins Center; Amherst, MA |
| January 13, 2021; 1:00 pm | | Rhode Island | W 80–77 ^{OT} | 4–3 (3–1) | Mullins Center; Amherst, MA |
| January 17, 2021; 2:30 pm, NBCSN | | at Fordham | W 65–46 | 5–3 (4–1) | Rose Hill Gymnasium; Bronx, NY |
| January 20, 2021 | | Saint Louis; Postponed due to COVID-19 issues | | | Mullins Center; Amherst, MA |
| January 24, 2021; 12:00 pm, CBSSN | | Davidson | L 60–69 | 5–4 (4–2) | Mullins Center; Amherst, MA |
| January 30, 2021; 2:00 pm, ESPN+ | | at George Mason; Postponed due to COVID-19 issues | | | EagleBank Arena; Fairfax, VA |
| February 3, 2021; 6:00 pm, NESN/ESPN+ | | Fordham | W 60–54 | 6–4 (5–2) | Mullins Center; Amherst, MA |
| February 6, 2021; 8:00 pm, ESPN2 | | at Rhode Island | W 75–63 | 7–4 (6–2) | Ryan Center; Kingston, RI |
| February 9, 2021; 7:00 pm, ESPNU | | Dayton; Postponed due to COVID-19 issues | | | Mullins Center; Amherst, MA |
| February 12, 2021; 7:00 pm, ESPN+ | | at VCU; Postponed due to COVID-19 issues | | | Siegel Center; Richmond, VA |
| February 14, 2021; 2:00 pm, NBCSN | | St. Bonaventure; Postponed due to COVID-19 issues | | | Mullins Center; Amherst, MA |
| February 20, 2021; 6:00 pm, ESPN+ | | at Duquesne; Postponed due to COVID-19 issues | | | UPMC Cooper Fieldhouse; Pittsburgh, PA |
| February 23, 2021; 6:00 pm, ESPN+ | | at Richmond | L 65–79 | 7–5 (6–3) | Robins Center; Richmond, VA |
| March 1, 2021; 6:00 pm, CBSSN | | at Saint Louis | L 54–78 | 7–6 (6–4) | Chaifetz Arena; St. Louis, MO |
A-10 tournament
| March 4, 2021; 1:00 pm, NBCSN | (5) | vs. (13) Saint Joseph's; Second round | W 100–66 | 8–6 | Robins Center (250); Richmond, VA |
| March 5, 2021; 1:00 pm, NBCSN | (5) | vs. (4) Saint Louis; Quarterfinals | L 72–86 | 8–7 | Robins Center (250); Richmond, VA |
*Non-conference game. ^{#}Rankings from AP Poll / Coaches' Poll. (#) Tournament seedings in parentheses. All times are in Eastern.
