= Tyson Acuff =

American basketball player

Free agent
- Position: Shooting guard

Personal information
- Born: September 16, 2002 (age 24)
- Listed height: 6 ft 4 in (1.93 m)
- Listed weight: 210 lb (95 kg)

Career information
- High school: Cass Technical (Detroit, Michigan)
- College: Duquesne (2020–2022); Eastern Michigan (2022–2024); Rutgers (2024–2025)
- NBA draft: 2025: undrafted
- Playing career: 2025–present

Career history
- 2025–2026: BC Kalev

Career highlights
- Third-team All-MAC (2024)

Tyson Acuff (born September 16, 2002) is an American professional basketball player who mostly recently played for BC Kalev of the Korvpalli Meistriliiga and the Estonian-Latvian Basketball League. He played college basketball for the Duquesne Dukes, the Eastern Michigan Eagles, and the Rutgers Scarlet Knights.

== High school career ==
Acuff attended Cass Technical High School in Detroit, Michigan. As a junior, he averaged 16.6 points per game. He finished his senior season averaging 27.6 points, 10.3 rebounds, 6.3 assists, and 4.2 steals per game. A three-star recruit, Acuff committed to play college basketball at Duquesne University over offers from Georgia State, Toledo, and Siena.

== College career ==
After averaging 5.7 points and 2.9 rebounds per game as a sophomore, Acuff entered the transfer portal. In May 2022, he announced his commitment to Eastern Michigan. Acuff spent two seasons at Eastern Michigan, averaging 21.7 points per game in his second season on campus, before entering the transfer portal for a second time.

On April 1, 2024, Acuff announced his commitment to Rutgers. In June 2024, Acuff fractured his right foot in practice and was expected to miss three months of basketball activities.

== Professional career ==
On September 21, 2025, Acuff signed with BC Kalev of the Korvpalli Meistriliiga.

== Career statistics ==
Legend
GP	Games played	GS	Games started	MPG	Minutes per game
FG%	Field goal percentage	3P%	3-point field goal percentage	FT%	Free throw percentage
RPG	Rebounds per game	APG	Assists per game	SPG	Steals per game
BPG	Blocks per game	PPG	Points per game	**Bold**	Career high

=== College ===
Year	Team	GP	GS	MPG	FG%	3P%	FT%	RPG	APG	SPG	BPG	PPG
2020–21	Duquesne	18	0	13.7	.373	.294	1.000	1.1	.9	.5	.1	3.7
2021–22	Duquesne	30	16	23.0	.448	.394	.737	2.9	.9	.6	.2	5.7
2022–23	Eastern Michigan	30	30	34.5	.458	.344	.813	2.8	2.7	1.3	.1	14.3
2023–24	Eastern Michigan	27	27	37.9	.433	.292	.811	3.6	2.8	1.1	.1	21.7
