= 2020–21 La Salle Explorers men's basketball team =

American college basketball season

2020–21 La Salle Explorers men's basketball
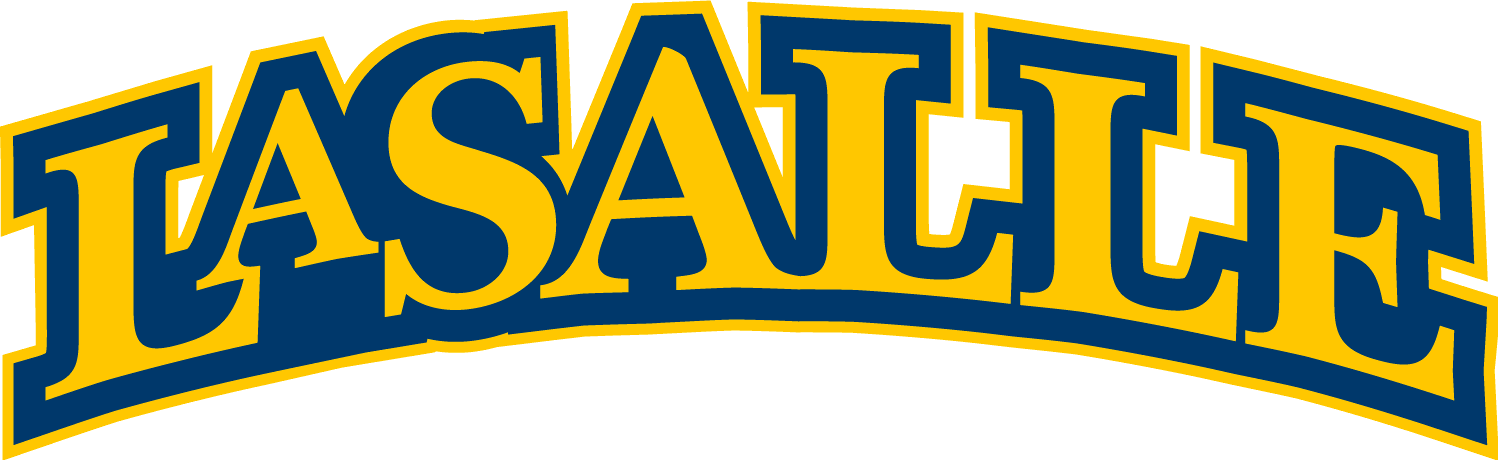
- Conference: Atlantic 10 Conference
- Record: 9–16 (6–11 A-10)
- Head coach: Ashley Howard (3rd season)
- Assistant coaches: Kyle Griffin; Donnie Carr; Jamal Robinson
- Home arena: Tom Gola Arena

2020–21 Atlantic 10 men's basketball standings
	Conf.				Overall
Team	W		L	PCT	W		L	PCT
St. Bonaventure†	11	–	4	.733	16	–	5	.762
VCU	10	–	4	.714	19	–	7	.731
Davidson	7	–	4	.636	13	–	9	.591
Saint Louis	6	–	4	.600	14	–	7	.667
UMass	6	–	4	.600	8	–	7	.533
George Mason	8	–	6	.571	13	–	9	.591
Dayton	9	–	7	.563	14	–	10	.583
Richmond	6	–	5	.545	14	–	9	.609
Duquesne	7	–	7	.500	9	–	9	.500
Rhode Island	7	–	10	.412	10	–	15	.400
George Washington	3	–	5	.375	5	–	12	.294
La Salle	6	–	11	.353	9	–	16	.360
Saint Joseph's	3	–	9	.250	5	–	15	.250
Fordham	2	–	11	.154	2	–	12	.143
† 2021 A10 Tournament winner

The 2020–21 La Salle Explorers basketball team represented La Salle University during the 2020–21 NCAA Division I men's basketball season. The Explorers, led by third-year head coach Ashley Howard, played their home games at Tom Gola Arena in Philadelphia, Pennsylvania as members of the Atlantic 10 Conference. They finished the season 9–16, 6–11 in A-10 Play to finish in 12th place. They lost in the first round of the A-10 tournament to Saint Joseph's.

== Previous season ==
The Explorers finished the 2019–20 season 15–15, 6–12 in A-10 play to finish in tenth place. Their season ended when the A-10 tournament and all other postseason tournaments were canceled due to the ongoing COVID-19 pandemic.

== Offseason ==
=== Departures ===
Name	Number	Pos.	Height	Weight	Year	Hometown	Reason for departure
Ayinde Hakim	0	G	5'11"	165	Sophomore	Washington, D.C.	Midseason transfer to UMass Lowell
Isaiah Deas	10	G	6'6"	200	Senior	Brooklyn, NY	Graduated
Ed Croswell	11	F	6'8"	250	Sophomore	Philadelphia, PA	Transferred to Providence
Saul Phiri	13	G	6'4"	215	Senior	Haverhill, MA	Graduated
Brandon Stone	23	F	6'11"	200	Sophomore	Alverton, PA	Midseason transfer to Robert Morris
Moustapha Diagne	35	F	6'9"	230	RS Senior	Rufisque, Senegal	Graduated

=== 2020 recruiting class ===
College recruiting information
Name	Hometown	School	Height	Weight	Commit date
Anwar Gill; SG	Washington, DC	Montverde Academy	6 ft 4 in (1.93 m)	205 lb (93 kg)	Oct 5, 2019
Anwar Gill; SG	Recruit ratings: Scout: Rivals: (69)				
Jhamir Brickus; PG	Coatesville, PA	Coatesville Area High School	5 ft 11 in (1.80 m)	205 lb (93 kg)	Mar 18, 2020
Jhamir Brickus; PG	Recruit ratings: Scout: Rivals: (NR)				
Tegray Izay; C	Montreal, Canada	Archbishop Carroll High School	6 ft 10 in (2.08 m)	265 lb (120 kg)	Mar 21, 2020
Tegray Izay; C	Recruit ratings: Scout: Rivals: (NR)				
Derrius Ward; SG	Philadelphia, PA	St. Thomas More School	6 ft 6 in (1.98 m)	185 lb (84 kg)	Apr 5, 2020
Derrius Ward; SG	Recruit ratings: Scout: Rivals: (NR)				
Overall recruit ranking:
Note: In many cases, Scout, Rivals, 247Sports, On3, and ESPN may conflict in their listings of height and weight.; In these cases, the average was taken. ESPN grades are on a 100-point scale.; Sources: "2020 Team Ranking". Rivals.

== Roster ==
2020–21 La Salle Explorers men's basketball team
Players
Coaches

Pos.	#	Name	Height	Weight	Year	Previous school	Hometown
G	1	David Beatty	6 ft 2 in (1.88 m)	200 lb (91 kg)	Sr	Imhotep Institute Charter; South Carolina	Philadelphia, PA
G	2	Scott Spencer	6 ft 6 in (1.98 m)	210 lb (95 kg)	RS Sr	Blue Ridge; Clemson	Suffolk, VA
G	3	Christian Ray	6 ft 6 in (1.98 m)	215 lb (98 kg)	So	Haverford School	Gap, PA
G	4	Sherif Kenney	6 ft 4 in (1.93 m)	215 lb (98 kg)	So	Orr Academy	Washington, D.C.
G	5	Jack Clark	6 ft 8 in (2.03 m)	200 lb (91 kg)	RS So	Cheltenham	Wyncote, PA
G	10	Derrius Ward	6 ft 6 in (1.98 m)	185 lb (84 kg)	Fr	St. Thomas More	Philadelphia, PA
G	11	Anwar Gill	6 ft 4 in (1.93 m)	205 lb (93 kg)	Fr	Montverde Academy	Washington, D.C.
G	12	Kyle Thompson (W)	5 ft 10 in (1.78 m)	200 lb (91 kg)	RS So	Archbishop Wood; West Chester	Horsham, PA
G	13	Jhamir Brickus	5 ft 11 in (1.8 m)	205 lb (93 kg)	Fr	Coatesville	Coatesville, PA
C	14	Tegra Izay	6 ft 10 in (2.08 m)	265 lb (120 kg)	Fr	Archbishop Carroll	Montreal, Canada
F/C	21	Clifton Moore	6 ft 10 in (2.08 m)	240 lb (109 kg)	RS Jr	Hatboro-Horsham; Indiana	Horsham, PA
F	24	Jared Kimbrough	6 ft 8 in (2.03 m)	225 lb (102 kg)	Jr	Neptune	Neptune, NJ
G	25	Andrew Lafond (W)	5 ft 10 in (1.78 m)	150 lb (68 kg)	Jr	St. Joseph's Prep	Philadelphia, PA

Head coach

- Ashley Howard (Drexel)

Assistant coach(es)

- Kyle Griffin (Siena)
- Donnie Carr (La Salle)
- Jamal Robinson (Virginia)

Legend

- (C) Team captain
- (S) Suspended
- (I) Ineligible
- (W) Walk-on
- Injured
- Current redshirt

Roster

== Schedule and results ==
Date time, TV	Rank^{#}	Opponent^{#}	Result	Record	Site (attendance) city, state
Regular season
November 26, 2020*; 2:00 p.m., FS1		at St. John's; Joe Lapchick Tournament	L 65–82	0–1	Carnesecca Arena; Queens, NY
November 27, 2020*; 4:00 p.m.		vs. Saint Peter's; Joe Lapchick Tournament	L 51–62	0–2	Carnessecca Arena; Queens, NY
December 6, 2020*; 4:00 p.m., ESPN+		at Army	L 59–63	0–3	Christl Arena; West Point, NY
December 8, 2020*; 4:00 p.m., ESPN+		Lincoln (PA.)	W 80–62	1–3	Tom Gola Arena; Philadelphia, PA
December 12, 2020*; 2:00 p.m.		at Drexel	W 58–48	2–3	Daskalakis Athletic Center; Philadelphia, PA
December 16, 2020; 12:00 p.m., ESPN+		UMass	L 66–85	2–4 (0–1)	Tom Gola Arena; Philadelphia, PA
December 19, 2020*; 4:30 p.m.		Delaware	W 71–61	3–4	Tom Gola Arena; Philadelphia, PA
December 22, 2020*; 7:00 p.m.		at Maryland	L 71–84	3–5	Xfinity Center; College Park, MD
December 30, 2020; 7:00 p.m., ESPN+		at Dayton	W 67–65	4–5 (1–1)	UD Arena; Dayton, OH
January 2, 2021; 6:30 p.m.		Fordham	W 89–52	5–5 (2–1)	Tom Gola Arena; Philadelphia, PA
January 6, 2021; 5:00 p.m.		No. 23 Saint Louis	Postponed due to COVID-19 issues		Tom Gola Arena; Philadelphia, PA
January 9, 2021; 7:00 pm, NBCSN		at UMass	L 67–83	5–6 (2–2)	Mullins Center; Amherst, MA
January 13, 2021; 7:00 pm, ESPN+		George Mason	L 42–75	5–7 (2–3)	EagleBank Arena (250); Fairfax, VA
January 16, 2021; 2:00 pm, ESPN+		Davidson	L 53–77	5–8 (2–4)	Tom Gola Arena; Philadelphia, PA
January 18, 2021; 4:00 pm, CBSSN		Saint Joseph's	W 90–83	6–8 (3–4)	Tom Gola Arena; Philadelphia, PA
January 23, 2021; 2:30 pm, NBCSN		at Richmond	W 84–78	7–8 (4–4)	Robins Center; Richmond, VA
January 27, 2021; 5:00 pm, ESPN+		Rhode Island	L 60–73	7–9 (4–5)	Tom Gola Arena; Philadelphia, PA
January 30, 2021; 1:00 pm, NBCSN		at VCU	L 62–73	7–10 (4–6)	Siegel Center (250); Richmond, VA
February 3, 2021; 7:00 pm, ESPN+		Saint Louis	W 82–75	8–10 (5–6)	Tom Gola Arena; Philadelphia, PA
February 6, 2021; 12:30 pm, NBCSN		at Fordham	L 68–76	8–11 (5–7)	Rose Hill Gymnasium; Bronx, NY
February 10, 2021; 6:00 pm, ESPN+		at St. Bonaventure	L 73–86	8–12 (5–8)	Reilly Center; Olean, NY
February 13, 2021; 2:00 pm, ESPN+		George Washington	Postponed due to COVID-19 issues		Tom Gola Arena; Philadelphia, PA
February 16, 2021; 8:00 pm, ESPN+		at Saint Louis	L 57–78	8–13 (5–9)	Chaifetz Arena; St. Louis, MO
February 20, 2021; 12:30 pm, NBCSN		at Saint Joseph's	L 82–91 ^{OT}	8–14 (5–10)	Hagan Arena; Philadelphia, PA
February 24, 2021; 7:00 pm, ESPN+		Duquesne	W 85–65	9–14 (6–10)	Tom Gola Arena (26); Philadelphia, PA
February 27, 2021; 4:30 pm, NBCSN		at George Mason	L 54–89	9–15 (6–11)	EagleBank Arena (250); Fairfax, VA
Atlantic 10 tournament
March 3, 2021; 11:00 am, ESPN+	(12)	vs. (13) Saint Joseph's; First round	L 66–72	9–16	Siegel Center; Richmond, VA
*Non-conference game. ^{#}Rankings from AP Poll. (#) Tournament seedings in parentheses. All times are in Eastern Time.
