= 2020–21 Dayton Flyers men's basketball team =

American college basketball season

2020–21 Dayton Flyers men's basketball

NIT, first round
- Conference: Atlantic 10 Conference
- Record: 14–10 (9–7 A-10)
- Head coach: Anthony Grant (4th season)
- Associate head coach: Anthony Solomon (4th season)
- Assistant coaches: Ricardo Greer (4th season); Darren Hertz (2nd season)
- Home arena: UD Arena

2020–21 Atlantic 10 men's basketball standings
	Conf.				Overall
Team	W		L	PCT	W		L	PCT
St. Bonaventure†	11	–	4	.733	16	–	5	.762
VCU	10	–	4	.714	19	–	7	.731
Davidson	7	–	4	.636	13	–	9	.591
Saint Louis	6	–	4	.600	14	–	7	.667
UMass	6	–	4	.600	8	–	7	.533
George Mason	8	–	6	.571	13	–	9	.591
Dayton	9	–	7	.563	14	–	10	.583
Richmond	6	–	5	.545	14	–	9	.609
Duquesne	7	–	7	.500	9	–	9	.500
Rhode Island	7	–	10	.412	10	–	15	.400
George Washington	3	–	5	.375	5	–	12	.294
La Salle	6	–	11	.353	9	–	16	.360
Saint Joseph's	3	–	9	.250	5	–	15	.250
Fordham	2	–	11	.154	2	–	12	.143
† 2021 A10 Tournament winner

The 2020–21 Dayton Flyers men's basketball team represented the University of Dayton in the 2020–21 NCAA Division I men's basketball season. Their head coach was Anthony Grant, in his fourth season with the Flyers. The Flyers played their home games at UD Arena in Dayton, Ohio as members of the Atlantic 10 Conference. They finished the season 14–10, 9–7 to finish in 7th place. They defeated Rhode Island in the second round in the A10 Tournament before losing to VCU in the quarterfinals. They were invited to the NIT where they lost in the first round to Memphis.

== Previous season ==
The Flyers finished the season with an overall record of 29–2 and were undefeated regular season champions of the Atlantic 10. Grant was named consensus national coach of the year while sophomore Obi Toppin became Dayton's first consensus first-team All-American and earned the majority of major college player of the year awards, including the Naismith College Player of the Year and the John R. Wooden Award. The season was cut short due to the COVID-19 pandemic prior to the Flyers’ first game of the Atlantic 10 tournament. They finished ranked third in both major polls, their highest ranking in a major media poll since the Don Donoher era.

== Offseason ==
=== Departures ===
Name	Number	Pos.	Height	Weight	Year	Hometown	Reason for departure
Obi Toppin	1	F	6'9"	220	RS Sophomore	Ossining, NY	Declared for 2020 NBA draft
Trey Landers	3	G	6'5"	221	Senior	Huber Heights, OH	Graduated
Jared Becker	4	G	6'4"	180	Freshman	Milford, OH	Walk-on; did not return
Sean Loughran	11	G	6'3"	200	Freshman	Pittsburgh, PA	Walk-on; did not return
Jheury Matos	31	G	6'5"	196	RS Junior	Santo Republic, DR	Transferred to Charlotte
Ryan Mikesell	33	F	6'7"	217	Graduate Student	St. Henry, OH	Graduated

=== Incoming transfers ===
Name	Number	Pos.	Height	Weight	Year	Hometown	Previous School
Elijah Weaver	11	G	6'6"	205	Junior	Cocoa, FL	Transferred from USC. Weaver would sit out for first semester of the 2020–21 season until all transfers Ruled eligible.

=== 2020 recruiting class ===
College recruiting information
Name	Hometown	School	Height	Weight	Commit date
R. J. Blakney #74 SG	Windsor, CT	The Loomis Chaffee School	6 ft 6 in (1.98 m)	174 lb (79 kg)	Oct 25, 2019
R. J. Blakney #74 SG	Recruit ratings: Scout: Rivals: 247Sports: ESPN:				
Koby Brea; SG	Bronx, NY	Monsignor Scanlan High School	6 ft 5 in (1.96 m)	175 lb (79 kg)	Nov 13, 2019
Koby Brea; SG	Recruit ratings: Scout: Rivals: (NR)				
Lukas Frazier #71 PG	Mentor, OH	Lake Catholic	6 ft 3 in (1.91 m)	170 lb (77 kg)	Jun 11, 2019
Lukas Frazier #71 PG	Recruit ratings: Scout: Rivals: 247Sports: ESPN:				
Overall recruit ranking:
Note: In many cases, Scout, Rivals, 247Sports, On3, and ESPN may conflict in their listings of height and weight.; In these cases, the average was taken. ESPN grades are on a 100-point scale.; Sources: "2020 Team Ranking". Rivals.

=== 2021 recruiting class ===
College recruiting information (2021)
Name	Hometown	School	Height	Weight	Commit date
Mustapha Amzil #58 PF	Washington, PA	First Love Christian Academy	6 ft 9 in (2.06 m)	215 lb (98 kg)	Nov 16, 2020
Mustapha Amzil #58 PF	Recruit ratings: Scout: Rivals: 247Sports: ESPN:				
DaRon Holmes II #10 PF	Montverde, FL	Montverde Academy	6 ft 8 in (2.03 m)	195 lb (88 kg)	
DaRon Holmes II #10 PF	Recruit ratings: Scout: Rivals: 247Sports: ESPN:				
Malachi Smith #23 CG	Bronx, NY	St. Raymond for Boys	6 ft 0 in (1.83 m)	155 lb (70 kg)	Sep 22, 2019
Malachi Smith #23 CG	Recruit ratings: Scout: Rivals: 247Sports: ESPN:				
Kaleb Washington #26 SF	Mableton, GA	Pebblebrook	6 ft 7 in (2.01 m)	185 lb (84 kg)	Sep 22, 2019
Kaleb Washington #26 SF	Recruit ratings: Scout: Rivals: 247Sports: ESPN:				
Overall recruit ranking:
Note: In many cases, Scout, Rivals, 247Sports, On3, and ESPN may conflict in their listings of height and weight.; In these cases, the average was taken. ESPN grades are on a 100-point scale.; Sources: "2021 Team Ranking". Rivals.

== Roster ==
2020–21 Dayton Flyers men's basketball team
Players
Coaches

Pos.	#	Name	Height	Weight	Year	Previous school	Hometown
G	0	Rodney Chatman	6 ft 1 in (1.85 m)	180 lb (82 kg)	RS Sr	Chattanooga	Lithonia, GA
G	2	Ibi Watson	6 ft 5 in (1.96 m)	195 lb (88 kg)	RS Sr	Michigan	Pickerington, OH
G	3	Luke Frazier	6 ft 5 in (1.96 m)	170 lb (77 kg)	Fr	Lake Catholic	Mentor, OH
G	4	Koby Brea	6 ft 6 in (1.98 m)	174 lb (79 kg)	Fr	Monsignor Scanlan	Washington Heights, NY
G	10	Jalen Crutcher	6 ft 2 in (1.88 m)	175 lb (79 kg)	Sr	Ridgeway	Memphis, TN
G	11	Elijah Weaver	6 ft 6 in (1.98 m)	205 lb (93 kg)	Jr	USC	Cocoa, FL
F	12	Zimi Nwojeki	6 ft 7 in (2.01 m)	220 lb (100 kg)	RS Fr	SPIRE Academy	Quincy, FL
C	14	Moulaye Sissoko	6 ft 9 in (2.06 m)	250 lb (113 kg)	RS Fr	Lincoln Academy	Bamako, Mali
G/F	23	R. J. Blakney	6 ft 6 in (1.98 m)	195 lb (88 kg)	Fr	Loomis Caffee School	Baltimore, MD
F	30	Mustapha Amzil	6 ft 10 in (2.08 m)	220 lb (100 kg)	Fr	HBA-Marsky	Helsinki, Finland
C	32	Jordy Tshimanga	6 ft 11 in (2.11 m)	278 lb (126 kg)	GS	Nebraska	Montreal, Quebec
G	35	Dwayne Cohill	6 ft 2 in (1.88 m)	180 lb (82 kg)	Jr	Holy Name	Cleveland, OH
F	40	Chase Johnson (L)	6 ft 9 in (2.06 m)	226 lb (103 kg)	RS Jr	Florida	Ripley, WV
G	51	Drew Swerlein (W)	6 ft 0 in (1.83 m)	175 lb (79 kg)	RS So	St. Francis De Sales	Perrysburg, OH
G	52	Camron Greer (W)	5 ft 7 in (1.7 m)	160 lb (73 kg)	Sr	Rich Central	Country Club Hills, IL
G	53	Christian Wilson (W)	6 ft 1 in (1.85 m)	160 lb (73 kg)	RS Jr	Northmont	Dayton, OH

Head coach

- Anthony Grant (Dayton)

Assistant coach(es)

- Anthony Solomon (Virginia)
- Darren Hertz (Florida)
- Ricardo Greer (Pittsburgh)

Legend

- (C) Team captain
- (S) Suspended
- (I) Ineligible
- (W) Walk-on
- Injured
- Current redshirt

Roster

== Schedule and results ==
Dayton had to cancel its games against Cedarville, Alcorn State, and Purdue Fort Wayne due to the COVID-19 pandemic. They also postponed their game against George Washington.

Date time, TV	Rank^{#}	Opponent^{#}	Result	Record	High points	High rebounds	High assists	Site (attendance) city, state
Exhibition
Nov 28, 2020*; Canceled		Cedarville						UD Arena; Dayton, OH
Regular season
Dec 1, 2020*; 7:00 p.m., ESPN+		Eastern Illinois	W 66–63	1–0	16 – Watson	8 – Tshimanga	6 – Crutcher	UD Arena (0); Dayton, OH
Dec 5, 2020*; 2:00 p.m., ESPN+		SMU	L 64–66	1–1	23 – Watson	12 – Tshimanga	7 – Crutcher	UD Arena (0); Dayton, OH
Dec 8, 2020*; 7:00 pm, ESPN+		Northern Kentucky	W 66–60	2–1	19 – Watson	10 – Johnson	8 – Crutcher	UD Arena (0); Dayton, OH
Dec 12, 2020*; 3:00 p.m., ESPNU		vs. Mississippi State; Holiday Hoopsgiving	W 85–82 ^{2OT}	3–1	23 – Crutcher	7 – Johnson	5 – Watson	State Farm Arena (0); Atlanta, GA
Dec 19, 2020*; 2:30 p.m., NBCSN		Ole Miss	W 65–62	4–1	23 – Crutcher	5 – Tshimanga	4 – Tied	UD Arena (0); Dayton, OH
Dec 30, 2020; 7:00 p.m., ESPN+		La Salle	L 65–67	4–2 (0–1)	22 – Amzil	7 – Tied	7 – Chatman	UD Arena (0); Dayton, OH
Jan 2, 2020; 4:30 p.m., NBCSN		George Mason	W 75–64	5–2 (1–1)	26 – Crutcher	6 – Tied	7 – Crutcher	UD Arena (0); Dayton, OH
Jan 5, 2020; 6:00 p.m., ESPN+		at Fordham	L 54–55	5–3 (1–2)	14 – Crutcher	16 – Tshimanga	3 – Crutcher	Rose Hill Gym (0); New York, NY
Jan 8, 2021; 9:00 p.m., ESPN2		at Davidson	W 89–78 ^{OT}	6–3 (2–2)	29 – Crutcher	8 – Tshimanga	7 – Weaver	John M. Belk Arena (0); Davidson, NC
Jan 13, 2021; 7:00 pm, CBSSN		Duquesne	W 72–63	7–3 (3–2)	19 – Watson	9 – Tshimanga	6 – Weaver	UD Arena (0); Dayton, OH
Jan 17, 2021; 4:30 pm, NBCSN		at George Washington	W 67–54	8–3 (4–2)	23 – Crutcher	8 – Tshimanga	6 – Weaver	Charles E. Smith Center (0); Washington, D.C.
Jan 23, 2021; 3:30 pm, CBSSN		at VCU	L 43–66	8–4 (4–3)	10 – Tied	5 – Tied	4 – Weaver	Siegel Center (250); Richmond, VA
Jan 26, 2021; 8:30 pm, CBSSN		at No. 22 Saint Louis	W 76–71	9–4 (5–3)	27 – Crutcher	10 – Tshimanga	3 – Tied	Chaifetz Arena (0); St. Louis, MO
Jan 30, 2021; 4:00 pm, CBSSN		Rhode Island	W 67–56	10–4 (6–3)	22 – Watson	8 – Tshimanga	6 – Weaver	UD Arena (0); Dayton, OH
Feb 2, 2021; 9:00 pm, ESPN2		at Duquesne	L 64–69	10–5 (6–4)	28 – Crutcher	11 – Amzil	6 – Crutcher	UPMC Cooper Fieldhouse (212); Pittsburgh, PA
Feb 5, 2021; 7:00 pm, ESPN2		George Mason	W 74–65	11–5 (7–4)	21 – Crutcher	14 – Tshimanga	7 – Crutcher	UD Arena (0); Dayton, OH
Feb 9, 2021; 5:00 p.m., CBSSN		VCU	L 67–76	11–6 (7–5)	20 – Watson	12 – Tshimanga	8 – Crutcher	UD Arena (0); Dayton, OH
Feb 16, 2021; 7:00 pm, CBSSN		at Rhode Island	L 89–91 ^{2OT}	11–7 (7–6)	29 – Nwokeji	9 – Nwokeji	5 – Crutcher	Ryan Center (0); Kingston, RI
Feb 19, 2021; 7:00 pm, ESPN2		Saint Louis	W 76–53	12–7 (8–6)	19 – Crutcher	8 – Tshimanga	6 – Crutcher	UD Arena (0); Dayton, OH
Feb 24, 2021; 6:00 pm, ESPN+		at Saint Joseph's	L 84–97	12–8 (8–7)	17 – Crutcher	9 – Amzil	4 – Tied	Hagan Arena (0); Philadelphia, PA
Mar 1, 2021; 5:00 pm, ESPNU		at St. Bonaventure	W 55–52	13–8 (9–7)	14 – Watson	7 – Tshimanga	5 – Crutcher	Reilly Center (0); Olean, NY
A-10 tournament
March 4, 2021; 3:30 pm, NBCSN	(7)	vs. (10) Rhode Island; Second Round	W 84–72	14–8	25 – Watson	7 – Tshimanga	7 – Tied	Siegel Center (250); Richmond, VA
March 5, 2021; 3:30 pm, NBCSN	(7)	vs. (2) VCU; Quarterfinals	L 68–73	14–9	21 – Crutcher	10 – Tshimanga	2 – Tied	Siegel Center (250); Richmond, VA
NIT
March 20, 2021; Noon, ESPN	(4)	vs. (1) Memphis; First Round – Memphis bracket	L 60–71	14–10	16 – Weaver	8 – Amzil	3 – Tied	UNT Coliseum (0); Denton, TX
*Non-conference game. ^{#}Rankings from AP Poll. (#) Tournament seedings in parentheses. All times are in Eastern Time.

== Rankings ==
Ranking movements
	Week																				
Poll	Pre	1	2	3	4	5	6	7	8	9	10	11	12	13	14	15	16	17	18	19	Final
AP																					Not released
Coaches																					
