= 2021–22 Mississippi State Bulldogs men's basketball team =

American college basketball season

2021–22 Mississippi State Bulldogs men's basketball

NIT, First Round
- Conference: Southeastern Conference
- Record: 18–16 (8–10 SEC)
- Head coach: Ben Howland (7th season)
- Assistant coaches: George Brooks; Korey McCray; Ernie Zeigler
- Home arena: Humphrey Coliseum

2021–22 Southeastern Conference men's basketball standings
| | Conf. | | | | Overall |
| Team | W | | L | PCT | W | | L | PCT |
|---|---|---|---|---|---|---|---|---|
| No. 14 Auburn | 15 | – | 3 | .833 | 28 | – | 6 | .824 |
| No. 16 Kentucky | 14 | – | 4 | .778 | 26 | – | 8 | .765 |
| No. 15 Tennessee † | 14 | – | 4 | .778 | 27 | – | 8 | .771 |
| No. 8 Arkansas | 13 | – | 5 | .722 | 28 | – | 9 | .757 |
| LSU | 9 | – | 9 | .500 | 22 | – | 12 | .647 |
| Alabama | 9 | – | 9 | .500 | 19 | – | 14 | .576 |
| South Carolina | 9 | – | 9 | .500 | 18 | – | 13 | .581 |
| Texas A&M | 9 | – | 9 | .500 | 27 | – | 13 | .675 |
| Florida | 9 | – | 9 | .500 | 20 | – | 14 | .588 |
| Mississippi State | 8 | – | 10 | .444 | 18 | – | 16 | .529 |
| Vanderbilt | 7 | – | 11 | .389 | 19 | – | 17 | .528 |
| Missouri | 5 | – | 13 | .278 | 12 | – | 21 | .364 |
| Ole Miss | 4 | – | 14 | .222 | 13 | – | 19 | .406 |
| Georgia | 1 | – | 17 | .056 | 6 | – | 26 | .188 |
† 2022 SEC tournament winner Rankings from AP poll

The 2021–22 Mississippi State Bulldogs men's basketball team represented Mississippi State University during the 2021–22 NCAA Division I men's basketball season. The team was led by seventh-year head coach Ben Howland, and played their home games at Humphrey Coliseum in Starkville, Mississippi as a member of the Southeastern Conference. They finished the season 18–16, 8–10 in SEC play to finish 10th place. They defeated South Carolina in the second round of the SEC tournament before losing to Tennessee in the quarterfinals. They received an at-large bid to the National Invitation Tournament where they lost in the first round to Virginia.

Following the season, the school fired head coach Howland. On March 20, 2022, the school named New Mexico State head coach Chris Jans the team's new head coach.

== Previous season ==
In a season limited due to the ongoing COVID-19 pandemic, the Bulldogs finished the 2020–21 season 18–15, 8–10 in SEC play to finish in ninth place. They defeated Kentucky in the second round of the SEC tournament before losing to Alabama in the quarterfinals. They received an invitation to the National Invitation Tournament as the fourth seed in the Saint Louis bracket. There they defeated Saint Louis, Richmond, and Louisiana Tech to advance the championship game where they lost to Memphis.

== Offseason ==
=== Departures ===
| Name | Number | Pos. | Height | Weight | Year | Hometown | Reason for departure |
|---|---|---|---|---|---|---|---|
| Jalen Johnson | 0 | G/F | 6'6" | 210 | RS Senior | Baton Rouge, LA | Transferred to Texas A&M |
| D. J. Stewart Jr. | 3 | G | 6'6" | 205 | RS Sophomore | Grace, MS | Declare for 2021 NBA draft |
| Deivon Smith | 5 | G | 6'1" | 165 | Freshman | Loganville, GA | Transferred to Georgia Tech |
| Abdul Ado | 24 | F | 6'11" | 255 | RS Senior | Lagos, Nigeria | Graduate transferred to Cincinnati |
| Andrew Juskin | 30 | F | 6'11" | 240 | RS Sophomore | New Hope, MS | Walk-on; transferred to Elon |
| Quinten Post | 32 | F | 7'0" | 240 | Sophomore | Amsterdam, Netherlands | Transferred to Boston College |
| Reggie Morris | 33 | G | 6'1" | 160 | Freshman | Grandview, MO | Walk-on; transferred to Central Missouri |
| Keondre Montgomery | 55 | G/F | 6'7" | 200 | Freshman | Jackson, MS | Transferred to Alcorn State |

=== Incoming transfers ===
| Name | Number | Pos. | Height | Weight | Year | Hometown | Previous School |
|---|---|---|---|---|---|---|---|
| Rocket Watts | 0 | G | 6'2" | 185 | Junior | Detroit, MI | Michigan State |
| Shakeel Moore | 3 | G | 6'1" | 185 | Sophomore | Greensboro, NC | NC State |
| Garrison Brooks | 10 | F | 6'9" | 230 | Graduate Student | Lafayette, AL | North Carolina |
| D. J. Jeffries | 13 | F | 6'7" | 215 | Junior | Olive Branch, MS | Memphis |

=== 2021 recruiting class ===
College recruiting information
| Name | Hometown | School | Height | Weight | Commit date |
|---|---|---|---|---|---|
| KeShawn Murphy #18 PF | Birmingham, AL | Ramsay High School | 6 ft 8 in (2.03 m) | 225 lb (102 kg) | Aug 28, 2020 |
| KeShawn Murphy #18 PF | Recruit ratings: Scout: Rivals: 247Sports: ESPN: (83) | | | | |
| Alden Applewhite #28 SG | Memphis, TN | AZ Compass Prep | 6 ft 6 in (1.98 m) | 230 lb (100 kg) | Feb 26, 2021 |
| Alden Applewhite #28 SG | Recruit ratings: Scout: Rivals: 247Sports: ESPN: (82) | | | | |
| Cam Carter; SG | Donaldsonville, LA | Oak Hill Academy | 6 ft 3 in (1.91 m) | 180 lb (82 kg) | Feb 26, 2021 |
| Cam Carter; SG | Recruit ratings: Scout: Rivals: 247Sports: ESPN: (0) | | | | |
Overall recruit ranking:
Note: In many cases, Scout, Rivals, 247Sports, On3, and ESPN may conflict in their listings of height and weight.; In these cases, the average was taken. ESPN grades are on a 100-point scale.; Sources: "Mississippi State 2021 Basketball Commitments". Rivals.; "2021 Mississippi State Basketball Commits". Scout.; "ESPN". ESPN.; "Scout.com Team Recruiting Rankings". Scout.; "2021 Team Ranking". Rivals.

=== 2022 Recruiting class ===
College recruiting information (2022)
| Name | Hometown | School | Height | Weight | Commit date |
|---|---|---|---|---|---|
| Riley Kugel; SG | Orlando, FL | Dr. Phillips High School | 6 ft 4 in (1.93 m) | 175 lb (79 kg) | Sep 26, 2021 |
| Riley Kugel; SG | Recruit ratings: Scout: Rivals: 247Sports: ESPN: (0) | | | | |
Overall recruit ranking:
Note: In many cases, Scout, Rivals, 247Sports, On3, and ESPN may conflict in their listings of height and weight.; In these cases, the average was taken. ESPN grades are on a 100-point scale.; Sources: "Mississippi State 2022 Basketball Commitments". Rivals.; "2022 Mississippi State Basketball Commits". Scout.; "ESPN". ESPN.; "Scout.com Team Recruiting Rankings". Scout.; "2022 Team Ranking". Rivals.

== Roster ==
2021–22 Mississippi State Bulldogs men's basketball team
Players
Coaches

| Pos. | # | Name | Height | Weight | Year | Previous school | Hometown |
|---|---|---|---|---|---|---|---|
| G | 0 | Rocket Watts | 6 ft 2 in (1.88 m) | 185 lb (84 kg) | Jr | Michigan State | Detroit, MI |
| G | 1 | Iverson Molinar | 6 ft 3 in (1.91 m) | 190 lb (86 kg) | Jr | Veritas Prep (CA) | Panama City, Panama |
| F | 2 | Javian Davis | 6 ft 9 in (2.06 m) | 240 lb (109 kg) | RS Jr | Alabama | Canton, MS |
| G | 3 | Shakeel Moore | 6 ft 1 in (1.85 m) | 185 lb (84 kg) | So | NC State | Greensboro, NC |
| G/F | 4 | Cameron Matthews | 6 ft 7 in (2.01 m) | 225 lb (102 kg) | So | Olive Branch HS | Olive Branch, MS |
| G | 5 | Cam Carter | 6 ft 3 in (1.91 m) | 185 lb (84 kg) | Fr | Oak Hill Academy | Donaldsonville, LA |
| F | 10 | Garrison Brooks | 6 ft 9 in (2.06 m) | 230 lb (104 kg) | GS | North Carolina | Lafayette, AL |
| G/F | 11 | Andersson Garcia | 6 ft 7 in (2.01 m) | 210 lb (95 kg) | So | Hamilton Heights Christian Academy | Moca, DR |
| F | 12 | KeShawn Murphy | 6 ft 10 in (2.08 m) | 245 lb (111 kg) | Fr | Ramsey | Birmingham, AL |
| F | 13 | D. J. Jeffries | 6 ft 7 in (2.01 m) | 215 lb (98 kg) | Jr | Memphis | Olive Branch, MS |
| F | 20 | Derek Fountain | 6 ft 9 in (2.06 m) | 220 lb (100 kg) | So | Holly Springs HS | Holly Springs, MS |
| G | 21 | Justin Rumph (W) | 6 ft 5 in (1.96 m) | 220 lb (100 kg) | RS Sr | Southern Union State CC | Birmingham, AL |
| G | 24 | Tyler Brumfield (W) | 6 ft 2 in (1.88 m) | 185 lb (84 kg) | Fr | Montverde Academy | Los Angeles, CA |
| G | 25 | Isaac Stansbury (W) | 6 ft 1 in (1.85 m) | 170 lb (77 kg) | Jr | Greenwood HS | Bowling Green, KY |
| F | 35 | Tolu Smith | 6 ft 11 in (2.11 m) | 245 lb (111 kg) | RS Jr | Western Kentucky | Bay St. Louis, MS |
| F | 44 | Alden Applewhite | 6 ft 7 in (2.01 m) | 205 lb (93 kg) | Fr | AZ Compass Prep | Memphis, TN |

Head coach

- Ben Howland (Weber State)

Assistant coach(es)

- George Brooks (Mississippi State)
- Korey McCray (Mercer)
- Ernie Zeigler (Cleary)

Legend

- (C) Team captain
- (S) Suspended
- (I) Ineligible
- (W) Walk-on
- Injured
- Current redshirt

Roster

== Schedule and results ==
| Date time, TV | Rank^{#} | Opponent^{#} | Result | Record | High points | High rebounds | High assists | Site (attendance) city, state |
Regular season
| November 10, 2021*; 7:00 p.m., SECN+ | | North Alabama | W 75–49 | 1–0 | 18 – Brooks | 14 – Matthews | 4 – Matthews | Humphrey Coliseum (6,671); Starkville, MS |
| November 13, 2021*; 6:00 p.m., SECN+ | | Montana | W 86–49 | 2–0 | 16 – Molinar | 11 – Brooks | 7 – Carter | Humphrey Coliseum (6,289); Starkville, MS |
| November 17, 2021*; 7:00 p.m., SECN+ | | Detroit Mercy; Baha Mar Hoops Bahamas Championship campus game | W 77–64 | 3–0 | 19 – Molinar | 7 – Brooks | 6 – Molinar | Humphrey Coliseum (6,497); Starkville, MS |
| November 21, 2021*; 2:00 p.m., SECN+ | | Morehead State | W 66–46 | 4–0 | 15 – Molinar | 10 – Jeffries | 6 – Molinar | Humphrey Coliseum (6,108); Starkville, MS |
| November 25, 2021*; 9:30 p.m., CBSSN | | vs. Louisville; Baha Mar Hoops Bahamas Championship semifinal | L 58–72 | 4–1 | 17 – Molinar | 7 – Matthews | 2 – Molinar | Baha Mar Convention Center; Nassau, Bahamas |
| November 27, 2021*; 12:30 p.m., FloHoops | | vs. Richmond; Baha Mar Hoops Bahamas consolation | W 82–71 ^{OT} | 5–1 | 22 – Smith | 11 – Smith | 7 – Molinar | Baha Mar Convention Center (1,175); Nassau, Bahamas |
| December 2, 2021*; 7:00 p.m., SECN+ | | Lamar | W 75–60 | 6–1 | 17 – Molinar | 11 – Smith | 5 – Jeffries | Humphrey Coliseum (5,981); Starkville, MS |
| December 5, 2021*; 1:00 p.m., SECN | | Minnesota | L 76–81 | 6–2 | 26 – Molinar | 10 – Brooks | 6 – Molinar | Humphrey Coliseum (6,965); Starkville, MS |
| December 11, 2021*; 1:00 p.m., ESPNU | | vs. Colorado State; Basketball Hall of Fame Classic | L 63–66 | 6–3 | 15 – Brooks | 6 – Moore | 5 – Molinar | Dickies Arena; Fort Worth, TX |
| December 14, 2021*; 7:00 p.m., SECN+ | | Georgia State | W 79–50 | 7–3 | 18 – Molinar | 9 – Fountain | 4 – Molinar | Humphrey Coliseum (5,953); Starkville, MS |
| December 17, 2021*; 6:00 p.m., SECN | | Furman | W 69–66 | 8–3 | 18 – Brooks | 6 – Moore | 4 – Moore | Humphrey Coliseum (5,797); Starkville, MS |
| December 21, 2021*; 6:00 p.m. | | vs. Winthrop | W 84–63 | 9–3 | 22 – Molinar | 6 – Matthews | 4 – Carter | Mississippi Coliseum (1,474); Jackson, MS |
| December 29, 2021; 4:00 p.m., SECN | | Arkansas | W 81–68 | 10–3 (1–0) | 18 – Smith | 10 – Brooks | 5 – Tied | Humphrey Coliseum (6,629); Starkville, MS |
| January 5, 2022; 8:00 p.m., SECN | | at Missouri | Postponed to February 20 | | | | | Mizzou Arena; Columbia, MO |
| January 8, 2022; 7:30 p.m., SECN | | at Ole Miss | L 72–82 | 10–4 (1–1) | 16 – Tied | 9 – Matthews | 4 – Matthews | SJB Pavilion (6,988); Oxford, MS |
| January 12, 2022; 6:00 p.m., SECN | | Georgia | W 88–72 | 11–4 (2–1) | 28 – Molinar | 6 – Davis | 7 – Molinar | Humphrey Coliseum (5,973); Starkville, MS |
| January 15, 2022; 5:00 p.m., SECN | | No. 24 Alabama | W 78–76 | 12–4 (3–1) | 24 – Molinar | 10 – Brooks | 4 – Molinar | Humphrey Coliseum (8,090); Starkville, MS |
| January 19, 2022; 6:30 p.m., SECN | | at Florida | L 72–80 | 12–5 (3–2) | 18 – Moore | 6 – Smith | 5 – Molinar | O'Connell Center (10,008); Gainesville, FL |
| January 22, 2022; 3:00 p.m., ESPNU | | Ole Miss | W 78–60 | 13–5 (4–2) | 20 – Molinar | 6 – Matthews | 7 – Moore | Humphrey Coliseum (9,739); Starkville, MS |
| January 25, 2022; 8:00 p.m., ESPN | | at No. 12 Kentucky | L 74–82 ^{OT} | 13–6 (4–3) | 30 – Molinar | 8 – Matthews | 4 – Moore | Rupp Arena (18,144); Lexington, KY |
| January 29, 2022*; 5:00 p.m., ESPN2 | | at No. 13 Texas Tech; Big 12/SEC Challenge | L 50–76 | 13–7 | 12 – Molinar | 5 – Garcia | 2 – Molinar | United Supermarkets Arena (15,098); Lubbock, TX |
| February 1, 2022; 6:00 p.m., ESPNU | | South Carolina | W 78–64 | 14–7 (5–3) | 20 – Molinar | 9 – Brooks | 5 – Jeffries | Humphrey Coliseum (6,678); Starkville, MS |
| February 5, 2022; 7:30 p.m., SECN | | at Arkansas | L 55–63 | 14–8 (5–4) | 19 – Molinar | 11 – Brooks | 3 – Tied | Bud Walton Arena (19,200); Fayetteville, AR |
| February 9, 2022; 8:00 p.m., ESPN2 | | No. 19 Tennessee | L 63–72 | 14–9 (5–5) | 16 – Molinar | 8 – Brooks | 5 – Molinar | Humphrey Coliseum (7,014); Starkville, MS |
| February 12, 2022; 7:00 p.m., ESPN2 | | at LSU | L 65–69 | 14–10 (5–6) | 26 – Molinar | 11 – Brooks | 5 – Brooks | Pete Maravich Assembly Center (10,975); Baton Rouge, LA |
| February 16, 2022; 6:00 p.m., ESPN2 | | at No. 25 Alabama | L 75–80 | 14–11 (5–7) | 22 – Molinar | 7 – Matthews | 4 – Molinar | Coleman Coliseum (9,192); Tuscaloosa, AL |
| February 18, 2022; 8:30 p.m., SECN | | Missouri | W 68–49 | 15–11 (6–7) | 16 – Smith | 7 – Brooks | 5 – Jefferies | Humphrey Coliseum (6,813); Starkville, MS |
| February 20, 2022; 7:00 p.m., SECN | | at Missouri | W 58–56 | 16–11 (7–7) | 16 – Molinar | 8 – Smith | 2 – Garcia | Mizzou Arena (7,009); Columbia, MO |
| February 23, 2022; 5:30 p.m., SECN | | at South Carolina | L 56–66 | 16–12 (7–8) | 21 – Smith | 8 – Brooks | 3 – Jeffries | Colonial Life Arena (10,129); Columbia, SC |
| February 26, 2022; 12:00 p.m., SECN | | Vanderbilt | W 74–69 | 17–12 (8–8) | 22 – Smith | 8 – Smith | 3 – Brooks | Humphrey Coliseum (6,829); Starkville, MS |
| March 2, 2022; 8:00 p.m., SECN | | No. 5 Auburn | L 68–81 ^{OT} | 17–13 (8–9) | 22 – Smith | 13 – Garcia | 4 – Moore | Humphrey Coliseum (9,637); Starkville, MS |
| March 5, 2022; 7:30 p.m., SECN | | at Texas A&M | L 64–67 | 17–14 (8–10) | 18 – Smith | 6 – Tied | 4 – Molinar | Reed Arena (9,955); College Station, TX |
SEC tournament
| March 10, 2022; 5:00 pm, SECN | (10) | vs. (7) South Carolina; Second round | W 73–51 | 18–14 | 20 – Smith | 14 – Garcia | 5 – Moore | Amalie Arena (12,121); Tampa, FL |
| March 11, 2022; 5:00 pm, SECN | (10) | vs. (2) No. 9 Tennessee; Quarterfinals | L 59–72 | 18–15 | 15 – Moore | 6 – Tied | 3 – Tied | Amalie Arena (17,132); Tampa, FL |
NIT tournament
| March 16, 2022; 6:00 pm, ESPN2 | (3) | at Virginia; First Round – Oklahoma Bracket | L 57–60 | 18–16 | 16 – Smith | 11 – Smith | 4 – Molinar | John Paul Jones Arena (5,278); Charlottesville, VA |
*Non-conference game. ^{#}Rankings from AP Poll. (#) Tournament seedings in parentheses. All times are in Central Time.

== See also ==
- 2021–22 Mississippi State Bulldogs women's basketball team
