= 2020–21 Atlantic 10 Conference men's basketball season =

- League: NCAA Division I
- Sport: Basketball
- Duration: November 25, 2020 – March 14, 2021
- Teams: 14
- TV partner(s): CBSSN, NBCSN, CBS

Regular season
- Season champions: St. Bonaventure
- Season MVP: Bones Hyland, VCU

Tournament
- Champions: St. Bonaventure
- Runners-up: VCU
- Finals MVP: Osun Osunniyi, St. Bonaventure

Atlantic 10 men's basketball seasons
- ← 2019–20 2021–22 →

2020–21 Atlantic 10 men's basketball standings
	Conf.				Overall
Team	W		L	PCT	W		L	PCT
St. Bonaventure†	11	–	4	.733	16	–	5	.762
VCU	10	–	4	.714	19	–	7	.731
Davidson	7	–	4	.636	13	–	9	.591
Saint Louis	6	–	4	.600	14	–	7	.667
UMass	6	–	4	.600	8	–	7	.533
George Mason	8	–	6	.571	13	–	9	.591
Dayton	9	–	7	.563	14	–	10	.583
Richmond	6	–	5	.545	14	–	9	.609
Duquesne	7	–	7	.500	9	–	9	.500
Rhode Island	7	–	10	.412	10	–	15	.400
George Washington	3	–	5	.375	5	–	12	.294
La Salle	6	–	11	.353	9	–	16	.360
Saint Joseph's	3	–	9	.250	5	–	15	.250
Fordham	2	–	11	.154	2	–	12	.143
† 2021 A10 Tournament winner

The 2020–21 Atlantic 10 Conference men's basketball season is the 45th season of Atlantic 10 Conference basketball. The season began with practices in November 2020, followed by the start of the 2020–21 NCAA Division I men's basketball season in late November, delayed due to the COVID-19 pandemic. League play will begin in early January and end in early March.

The 2021 Atlantic 10 tournament was originally scheduled to be held from March 10–14, 2021, at Barclays Center in Brooklyn, New York, but due to ongoing impacts from the COVID-19 pandemic, the tournament was moved to campus locations. The tournament was first scheduled to be played on the same dates but split between the Robins Center at the University of Richmond and the Siegel Center at VCU, but the schedule was later adjusted so that the first four rounds will be played from March 3 to March 6 at those arenas with the championship game to be held March 14 at UD Arena at the University of Dayton.

Dayton were the defending regular season champion. Due to the COVID-19 pandemic, there was no defending Atlantic 10 Tournament champion.

== Preseason ==
=== Preseason poll ===
Prior to the season at the conference's annual media day, awards and a poll were chosen by a panel of the league's head coaches and select media members.

Rank	Team
1	Richmond (19)
2	Saint Louis (7)
3	Dayton (2)
4	St. Bonaventure
5	Duquesne
6	Rhode Island
7	Davidson
8	UMass
9	VCU
10	George Mason
11	George Washington
12	Saint Joseph's
13	La Salle
14	Fordham
(first place votes)

=== Preseason all-conference teams ===
Award	Recipients
Preseason All-Atlantic 10 First Team	Kellan Grady, Davidson
Preseason All-Atlantic 10 First Team	Jalen Crutcher, Dayton
Preseason All-Atlantic 10 First Team	Tre Mitchell, UMass
Preseason All-Atlantic 10 First Team	Fatts Russell, Rhode Island
Preseason All-Atlantic 10 First Team	Jacob Gilyard, Richmond
Preseason All-Atlantic 10 First Team	Jordan Goodwin, Saint Louis
Preseason All-Atlantic 10 Second Team	Marcus Weathers, Duquesne
Preseason All-Atlantic 10 Second Team	Blake Francis, Richmond
Preseason All-Atlantic 10 Second Team	Grant Golden, Richmond
Preseason All-Atlantic 10 Second Team	Kyle Lofton, St. Bonaventure
Preseason All-Atlantic 10 Second Team	Ryan Daly, Saint Joseph's
Preseason All-Atlantic 10 Second Team	Hasahn French, Saint Louis
Preseason All-Atlantic 10 Third Team	Sincere Carry, Duquesne
Preseason All-Atlantic 10 Third Team	Javon Greene, George Mason
Preseason All-Atlantic 10 Third Team	AJ Wilson, George Mason
Preseason All-Atlantic 10 Third Team	Osun Osunniyi, St. Bonaventure
Preseason All-Atlantic 10 Third Team	Javonte Perkins, Saint Louis
Preseason All-Atlantic 10 Third Team	Bones Hyland, VCU
Preseason All-Atlantic 10 Defensive Team	AJ Wilson, George Mason
Preseason All-Atlantic 10 Defensive Team	Jacob Gilyard, Richmond
Preseason All-Atlantic 10 Defensive Team	Osun Osunniyi, St. Bonaventure
Preseason All-Atlantic 10 Defensive Team	Hasahn French, Saint Louis
Preseason All-Atlantic 10 Defensive Team	Jordan Goodwin, Saint Louis

== Regular season ==
=== Early season tournaments ===
Team	Tournament	Finish
Davidson	Maui Invitational (Note: Due to the COVID-19 pandemic, the Maui Invitational Tournament was played at Harrah's Cherokee Center in Asheville, North Carolina instead of the Lahaina Civic Center in Lahaina, Hawaii.)	7th
Dayton	—	—
Duquesne	Wade Houseton Tipoff Classic	
Fordham	—	—
George Mason	DC Paradise Jam (Note: Due to the COVID-19 pandemic, the Paradise Jam tournament was played at the Walter E. Washington Convention Center in Washington, D.C. instead of the Sports and Fitness Center in Charlotte Amalie, U.S. Virgin Islands.)	2nd
George Washington	Veterans Classic	2nd
La Salle	—	—
Massachusetts	—	—
Rhode Island	2K Empire Classic	4th
Rhode Island	Hall of Fame Tip-Off	1st
Richmond	Bluegrass Showcase	1st
Saint Joseph's	Fort Myers Tip Off	4th
Saint Louis	Billiken Classic	1st
St. Bonaventure	—	—
VCU	Crossover Classic	3rd

=== Rankings ===
Legend
Increase in ranking
Decrease in ranking
Not ranked previous week
First Place votes shown in ()

		Pre	Wk 2	Wk 3	Wk 4	Wk 5	Wk 6	Wk 7	Wk 8	Wk 9	Wk 10	Wk 11	Wk 12	Wk 13	Wk 14	Wk 15	Wk 16	Final
Davidson	AP																	
Davidson	C																	
Dayton	AP																	
Dayton	C	RV	RV*															
Duquesne	AP																	
Duquesne	C																	
Fordham	AP																	
Fordham	C																	
George Mason	AP																	
George Mason	C																	
George Washington	AP																	
George Washington	C																	
La Salle	AP																	
La Salle	C																	
UMass	AP																	
UMass	C																	
Rhode Island	AP																	
Rhode Island	C																	
Richmond	AP	RV	19	19	RV	RV	RV											
Richmond	C	RV	RV*	19	25	23	RV		RV	RV								
Saint Joseph's	AP																	
Saint Joseph's	C																	
Saint Louis	AP	RV	RV	RV	RV	RV	RV	23	24	25	22	RV	RV	RV				
Saint Louis	C	RV	RV*	RV	RV	RV	RV	23	24	RV	24	RV	RV	RV				
St. Bonaventure	AP										RV	RV			RV	RV	RV	
St. Bonaventure	C										RV	RV			RV	RV	RV	
VCU	AP												RV	RV		RV		
VCU	C																	

*USA TODAY did not release a Coaches Poll for Week 2. AP does not release a final poll.

=== Conference matrix ===
This table summarizes the head-to-head results between teams in conference play. Each team will play 18 conference games: one game vs. eight opponents and two games against five opponents.

	DAV	DAY	DUQ	FOR	GMU	GWU	LAS	UMA	URI	RIC	STJ	STL	SBA	VCU
vs. Davidson	–	1–0	0–1	0–1	0–0	0–0	0–1	0–1	0–1	1–0	0–1	0–0	2–0	0–1
vs. Dayton	0–1	–	1–1	1–0	0–2	0–1	1–0	0–0	1–1	0–0	1–0	0–2	0–1	2–0
vs. Duquesne	1–0	1–1	–	0–2	0–0	1–1	1–0	0–0	0–2	1–0	0–1	0–0	2–0	0–0
vs. Fordham	1–0	0–1	2–0	–	1–0	1–0	1–1	2–0	1–0	0–0	0–0	1–0	1–0	0–0
vs. George Mason	0–0	2–0	0–0	0–1	–	0–1	0–2	0–1	1–0	1–0	0–2	0–0	1–0	1–1
vs. George Washington	0–0	1–0	1–1	0–1	1–0	–	0–0	0–0	0–1	0–0	0–0	0–0	1–0	1–0
vs. La Salle	1–0	0–1	0–1	1–1	2–0	0–0	–	2–0	1–0	0–1	1–1	1–1	1–0	1–0
vs. UMass	1–0	0–0	0–0	0–2	1–0	0–0	0–2	–	0–2	1–0	0–0	1–0	0–0	0–0
vs. Rhode Island	1–0	1–1	2–0	0–1	0–1	1–0	0–1	2–0	–	1–0	0–1	1–0	0–1	1–1
vs. Richmond	0–1	0–0	0–1	0–0	0–1	0–0	1–0	0–1	0–1	–	1–1	1–0	1–0	1–0
vs. Saint Joseph's	1–0	0–1	1–0	0–0	2–0	0–0	1–1	0–0	1–0	1–1	–	0–0	1–0	1–0
vs. Saint Louis	0–0	2–0	0–0	0–1	0–0	0–0	1–1	0–1	0–1	0–1	0–0	–	0–1	1–0
vs. St. Bonaventure	0–2	1–0	0–2	0–1	0–1	0–1	0–1	0–0	1–0	0–1	0–1	1–0	–	1–1
vs. VCU	1–0	0–2	0–0	0–0	1–1	0–1	0–1	0–0	1–1	0–1	0–1	0–1	1–1	–
Total	7–4	9–7	7–7	2–11	8–6	3–5	6–11	6–4	7–10	6–5	3–9	6–4	11–4	10–4

=== Records against other conferences ===
2020–21 records against non-conference foes as of February 19, 2021. Records shown for regular season only.

Power Conferences	Record
American	2–1
ACC	1–1
Big East	1–3
Big Ten	0–4
Big 12	0–4
Pac-12	0–1
SEC	6–2
Power Total	10–16
Other NCAA Division I Conferences	Record
America East	1–1
ASUN	0–0
Big Sky	0–0
Big South	1–1
Big West	0–0
CAA	6–5
C-USA	1–3
Horizon	1–0
Ivy	0–0
MAAC	0–1
MAC	1–0
MEAC	3–1
MVC	3–0
Mountain West	2–0
NEC	1–1
OVC	3–1
Patriot	0–2
Pacific West	0–0
SoCon	4–0
Southland	1–0
SWAC	1–0
Summit	1–0
Sun Belt	1–1
WAC	0–0
WCC	1–0
Other Division I Total	32–17
NCAA Division I Total	42–33
NCAA Division II Conferences	Record
CIAA	1–0
South Atlantic	1–0
NCAA Division II Total	2–0
NCAA Division III Conferences	Record
Coast to Coast	2–0
NCAA Division III Total	2–0
Overall	46–33

== Conference awards ==
On March 10, 2021, the Atlantic 10 announced its conference awards.

Award	Recipients
Coach of the Year	Mark Schmidt, St. Bonaventure
Player of the Year	Bones Hyland, VCU
Defensive Player of the Year	Osun Osunniyi, St. Bonaventure
Rookie of the Year	Tyler Kolek, George Mason
Chris Daniels Most Improved Player of the Year	Tyler Burton, Richmond
Sixth Man of the Year	Sherif Kenney, La Salle
First Team	Kellan Grady, Davidson Jalen Crutcher, Dayton Tre Mitchell, Massachusetts Kyle Lofton, St. Bonaventure Jordan Goodwin, Saint Louis Bones Hyland, VCU
Second Team	Marcus Weathers, Duquesne Blake Francis, Richmond Jacob Gilyard, Richmond Jaren Holmes, St. Bonaventure Osun Osunniyi, St. Bonaventure Javonte Perkins, Saint Louis
Third Team	Ibi Watson, Dayton Jordan Miller, George Mason Jamison Battle, George Washington Fatts Russell, Rhode Island Grant Golden, Richmond Vince Williams Jr., VCU
All-Academic Team	Jordy Tshimanga, Dayton Christian Ray, La Salle Tre Mitchell, Massachusetts Jaren Holmes, St. Bonaventure Gibson Jimerson, Saint Louis
All-Defensive Team	AJ Wilson, George Mason Jacob Gilyard, Richmond Osun Osunniyi, St. Bonaventure Jordan Goodwin, Saint Louis Hason Ward, VCU
All-Rookie Team	Mustapha Amzil, Dayton Tyler Kolek, George Mason Jhamir Brickus, La Salle Jordan Hall, Saint Joseph's Adrian Baldwin Jr., VCU

== Postseason ==
=== 2021 A-10 Tournament ===
Semifinals; Saturday, March 6 CBSSN
1	St. Bonaventure	71
4	Saint Louis	53
2	VCU	64
3	Davidson	52

Championship; Sunday, March 14; CBS
1	St. Bonaventure	74
2	VCU	65

=== 2021 NCAA Tournament ===
Two teams from the Atlantic 10 qualified for the NCAA Tournament. Tournament and regular-season champion St. Bonaventure qualified through the conference's automatic bid, while tournament and regular-season runner-up VCU qualified through an at-large bid.

Seed	Region	School	1st Round	2nd Round	Sweet Sixteen	Elite Eight	Final Four	Championship
9	East	St. Bonaventure	eliminated by (8) LSU, 61–76					
10	West	VCU	(7) Oregon advanced due to COVID-19 no-contest declaration					

=== 2021 NIT ===
Four teams from the Atlantic 10 earned at-large bids into the NIT.

Seed	School	First round	Quarterfinals	Semifinals	Championship
1	Saint Louis	eliminated by (4) Mississippi State, 68–74			
2	Davidson	eliminated by (3) NC State, 61–75			
2	Richmond	defeated (3) Toledo, 76–66	eliminated by (4) Mississippi State, 67–68		
4	Dayton	eliminated by (1) Memphis, 60–71			
