= Javonte Perkins =

American basketball player (born 1998)

Free agent
- Position: Shooting guard / small forward

Personal information
- Born: August 24, 1998 (age 28)
- Listed height: 6 ft 6 in (1.98 m)
- Listed weight: 215 lb (98 kg)

Career information
- High school: Miller Career Academy (St. Louis, Missouri)
- College: Southwestern Illinois (2017–2019); Saint Louis (2019–2023)
- NBA draft: 2023: undrafted

Career highlights
- Second-team All-Atlantic 10 (2021); Third-team All-Atlantic 10 (2020); Atlantic 10 Sixth Man of the Year (2020)

Javonte Perkins (born August 24, 1998) is an American professional basketball player who is a free agent. He played college basketball for the Southwestern Illinois Blue Storm and the Saint Louis Billikens.

== High school career ==
Perkins attended Clyde C. Miller Career Academy in St. Louis, Missouri. He averaged 15.7 points, 9.5 rebounds, 3.6 assists and 3.0 steals per game as a junior, leading the team to a 21–5 record. As a senior, he averaged 20.8 points and 15.6 rebounds per game. Perkins competed for Gateway Basketball Club on the Amateur Athletic Union circuit.

== College career ==
In his first two years of college basketball, Perkins played for Southwestern Illinois College. As a freshman, he averaged 20 points and 6.9 rebounds per game, shooting 60.5 percent from the floor. He averaged 26.4 points per game as a sophomore, which ranked third in the nation among junior college players. Perkins left as the program's all-time leading scorer. For his junior season, he committed to Saint Louis over two other NCAA Division I offers, including Louisiana–Monroe. After struggling initially, Perkins was given an expanded role during Atlantic 10 Conference play. In January 2020, he scored 25 points in consecutive games against Dayton and Davidson. On February 1, Perkins scored a season-high 33 points in a 78–73 win over Saint Joseph's. As a junior, he averaged 15 points and 3.5 rebounds per game, earning Third Team All-Atlantic 10 and Sixth Man of the Year honors. On November 28, Perkins posted 32 points, including 26 in the second half, and five assists in an 85–81 victory over LSU. As a senior during the 2020-2021 season he averaged 17.1 points and 3.9 rebounds per game. Perkins was named to the Second Team All-Atlantic 10. He missed the entire 2021-2022 season due to a torn ACL. Following the season, he announced he was taking advantage of the additional season of eligibility granted by the NCAA due to the COVID-19 pandemic and wil return for the 2022-2023 season as a redshirt graduate athlete.

== Professional career ==
After going undrafted in the 2023 NBA draft, Perkins joined the College Park Skyhawks of the NBA G League on October 29, 2023. However, he was waived on November 6.

On October 28, 2024, Perkins joined the Memphis Hustle, but was waived on November 3.

== Career statistics ==
Legend
GP	Games played	GS	Games started	MPG	Minutes per game
FG%	Field goal percentage	3P%	3-point field goal percentage	FT%	Free throw percentage
RPG	Rebounds per game	APG	Assists per game	SPG	Steals per game
BPG	Blocks per game	PPG	Points per game	**Bold**	Career high

=== College ===
==== NCAA Division I ====
Year	Team	GP	GS	MPG	FG%	3P%	FT%	RPG	APG	SPG	BPG	PPG
2019–20	Saint Louis	31	1	27.3	.443	.351	.768	3.5	.7	**.8**	.3	15.0
2020–21	Saint Louis	21	21	**30.5**	**.465**	**.376**	**.866**	**3.9**	**1.8**	.7	**.5**	**17.1**
2021–22	Saint Louis	Redshirt										
2022–23	Saint Louis	**33**	**33**	22.6	.420	.361	.815	1.9	.5	.5	.2	10.9
Career		85	55	26.2	.442	.362	.801	3.0	.9	.6	.3	14.0

==== JUCO ====
Year	Team	GP	GS	MPG	FG%	3P%	FT%	RPG	APG	SPG	BPG	PPG
2017–18	Southwestern Illinois	**28**	**27**	—	**.605**	**.426**	**.814**	6.9	1.8	**1.1**	.2	20.0
2018–19	Southwestern Illinois	27	**27**	—	.537	.360	.797	**7.9**	**2.7**	**1.1**	**.4**	**26.4**
Career		55	54	—	.567	.383	.803	7.4	2.2	1.1	.3	23.2

== Personal life ==
Perkins' mother, Ilean Stokes, was diagnosed with multiple sclerosis in 2008. He is the youngest of three children. Older brother, Trevin Stokes, who died on October 2, 2020 at the age of 38 and older sister Djuana Ashford.
