= 2020–21 Saint Louis Billikens men's basketball team =

American college basketball season

2020–21 Saint Louis Billikens men's basketball
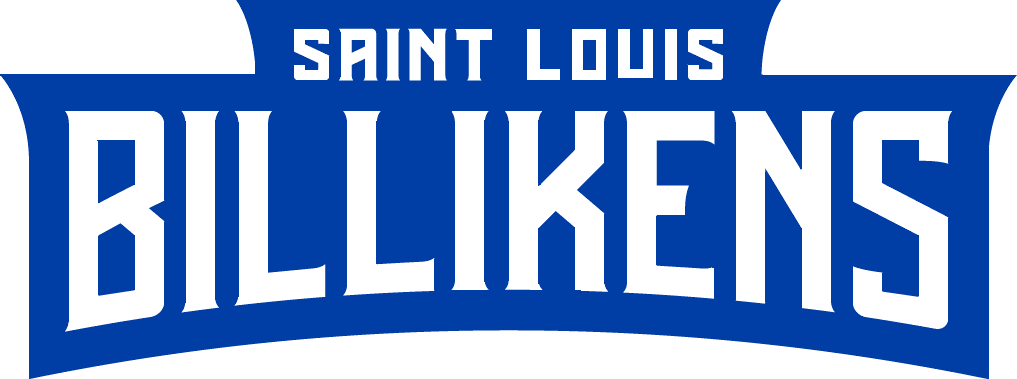

NIT, First Round
- Conference: Atlantic 10 Conference
- Record: 14–7 (6–4 A-10)
- Head coach: Travis Ford (5th season)
- Associate head coach: Corey Tate
- Assistant coaches: Ray Giacoletti; Ford Stuen
- Home arena: Chaifetz Arena

2020–21 Atlantic 10 men's basketball standings
	Conf.				Overall
Team	W		L	PCT	W		L	PCT
St. Bonaventure†	11	–	4	.733	16	–	5	.762
VCU	10	–	4	.714	19	–	7	.731
Davidson	7	–	4	.636	13	–	9	.591
Saint Louis	6	–	4	.600	14	–	7	.667
UMass	6	–	4	.600	8	–	7	.533
George Mason	8	–	6	.571	13	–	9	.591
Dayton	9	–	7	.563	14	–	10	.583
Richmond	6	–	5	.545	14	–	9	.609
Duquesne	7	–	7	.500	9	–	9	.500
Rhode Island	7	–	10	.412	10	–	15	.400
George Washington	3	–	5	.375	5	–	12	.294
La Salle	6	–	11	.353	9	–	16	.360
Saint Joseph's	3	–	9	.250	5	–	15	.250
Fordham	2	–	11	.154	2	–	12	.143
† 2021 A10 Tournament winner

The 2020–21 Saint Louis Billikens men's basketball team represented Saint Louis University during the 2020–21 NCAA Division I men's basketball season. Their head coach was Travis Ford in his fifth season at Saint Louis. The team played their home games at Chaifetz Arena as a member of the Atlantic 10 Conference. They finished the season 14–7, 6–4 to finish a tie for 4th place. They defeated UMass in the quarterfinals of the A-10 tournament before losing in the semifinals to St. Bonaventure. They received an invitation to the NIT where they lost in the first round to Mississippi State.

== Previous season ==
The Billikens finished the 2019-20 season 23–8, 12-6 in A-10 play in fourth place. Their season ended when the A-10 tournament and all other postseason tournaments were canceled due to the ongoing coronavirus pandemic.

== Offseason ==
=== Departures ===
Name	Number	Pos.	Height	Weight	Year	Hometown	Reason for departure
Tay Weaver	2	G	5'10"	170	Senior	Louisville, KY	Graduated
Madani Diarra	21	C	6'10"	240	Freshman	Bamako, Mail	Transferred to Eastern Illinois
KC Hankton	23	F	6'4"	195	Sophomore	Charlotte, NC	Transferred to Chattanooga
Jack Raboin	31	G	6'6"	205	Senior	Mattoon, IL	Graduated

=== Incoming transfers ===
Name	Number	Pos.	Height	Weight	Year	Hometown	Previous School
Marten Linssen	12	F	6'8"	255	Junior	Düsseldorf, Germany	Transferred from UNC Wilmington. Graduate Transfer, eligible immediately
Francis Okoro	5	F	6'9"	235	Junior	Imo, Nigeria	Transferred from Oregon. Under NCAA transfer rules, Okoro will have to sit out for the 2020–21 season. Will have two years of remaining eligibility.

=== 2020 recruiting class ===
College recruiting information
Name	Hometown	School	Height	Weight	Commit date
Markhi Strickland; G/F	Miami, FL	Victory Rock Prep	6 ft 5 in (1.96 m)	200 lb (91 kg)	Sep 30, 2019
Markhi Strickland; G/F	Recruit ratings: Rivals: 247Sports: (77)				
Phillip Russell; PG	St. Louis, MO	Vashon(MO)	5 ft 10 in (1.78 m)	165 lb (75 kg)	Aug 11, 2020
Phillip Russell; PG	Recruit ratings: Rivals: 247Sports:				
Andre Lorentsson; F	Gothenburg, Sweden	RIG Mark Kinna	6 ft 8 in (2.03 m)	205 lb (93 kg)	Feb 26, 2020
Andre Lorentsson; F	Recruit ratings: Rivals: 247Sports:				
Overall recruit ranking:
Note: In many cases, Scout, Rivals, 247Sports, On3, and ESPN may conflict in their listings of height and weight.; In these cases, the average was taken. ESPN grades are on a 100-point scale.; Sources:

== Roster ==
2020–21 Saint Louis Billikens men's basketball team
Players
Coaches

Pos.	#	Name	Height	Weight	Year	Previous school	Hometown
G	0	Jordan Goodwin	6 ft 3 in (1.91 m)	200 lb (91 kg)	Sr	Althoff Catholic	Centreville, Il
G	1	Yuri Collins	6 ft 0 in (1.83 m)	185 lb (84 kg)	So	St. Mary’s	St. Louis, MO
G/F	2	Markhi Strickland	6 ft 5 in (1.96 m)	200 lb (91 kg)	Fr	Victory Rock Prep	Miami, FL
G/F	3	Javonte Perkins	6 ft 6 in (1.98 m)	210 lb (95 kg)	Sr	Miller Career Academy; Southwestern Illinois College	St. Louis, MO
G	4	Phillip Russell (W)	5 ft 10 in (1.78 m)	165 lb (75 kg)	Fr	Vashon	St. Louis, MO
F	5	Francis Okoro (redshirt)	6 ft 9 in (2.06 m)	235 lb (107 kg)	RS Jr	Normal West; Oregon	Imo, Nigeria
G	10	Joshua Hightower (W)	6 ft 3 in (1.91 m)	175 lb (79 kg)	Sr	Glenelg Country; ASA College	Cooksville, MD
F	11	Hasahn French	6 ft 7 in (2.01 m)	240 lb (109 kg)	Sr	Commonwealth Academy	Middletown, NY
F	12	Marten Linssen	6 ft 8 in (2.03 m)	255 lb (116 kg)	RS Jr	Schloss-Gymnasium Benrath; Valparaiso; UNC Wilmington	Düsseldorf, Germany
F	13	Andre Lorentsson	6 ft 8 in (2.03 m)	205 lb (93 kg)	Fr	RIG Mark Kinna	Gothenburg, Sweden
G	15	Demarius Jacobs	6 ft 2 in (1.88 m)	185 lb (84 kg)	Jr	Uplift	Chicago, IL
G	20	Fred Thatch Jr.	6 ft 3 in (1.91 m)	215 lb (98 kg)	Jr	Sikeston	Sikeston, MO
F	22	Terrence Hargrove Jr.	6 ft 4 in (1.93 m)	215 lb (98 kg)	So	East St. Louis	East St. Louis, IL
G	24	Gibson Jimerson	6 ft 5 in (1.96 m)	200 lb (91 kg)	So	Montverde Academy	Richmond, VA
G	30	Brandon Courtney (W)	6 ft 3 in (1.91 m)	180 lb (82 kg)	Jr	Wesclin	Trenton, IL
F	32	Jimmy Bell Jr.	6 ft 10 in (2.08 m)	270 lb (122 kg)	So	Bella Vista Prep	Saginaw, MI

Head coach

- Travis Ford (Kentucky)

Assistant coach(es)

- Corey Tate (Missouri)
- Ray Giacoletti (Minot State University)
- Ford Stuen (Oklahoma State)

Legend

- (C) Team captain
- (S) Suspended
- (I) Ineligible
- (W) Walk-on
- Injured
- Current redshirt

Roster

== Schedule ==
Date time, TV	Rank^{#}	Opponent^{#}	Result	Record	High points	High rebounds	High assists	Site (attendance) city, state
Non-conference regular season
November 25, 2020*; 6:00 pm, ESPN+		SIU Edwardsville; Billiken Classic	W 89–52	1–0	22 – Perkins	11 – Goodwin	6 – Collins	Chaifetz Arena (0); St. Louis, MO
November 26, 2020*; 2:00 pm, ESPN+		LSU; Billiken Classic	W 85–81	2–0	32 – Perkins	11 – Goodwin	6 – Collins	Chaifetz Arena (0); St. Louis, MO
December 5, 2020*; 7:00 pm, FSMW		Arkansas–Pine Bluff	W 107–54	3–0	15 – Goodwin	7 – Goodwin	8 – Collins	Chaifetz Arena (0); St. Louis, MO
December 8, 2020*; 7:00 pm, FSMW		Central Arkansas	W 88–65	4–0	21 – Gibson	11 – Goodwin	9 – Collins	Chaifetz Arena (0); St. Louis, MO
December 15, 2020*; 7:00 pm, FSMW		Indiana State	W 78–59	5–0	22 – Goodwin	11 – Goodwin	10 – Collins	Chaifetz Arena (0); St. Louis, MO
December 17, 2020*; 7:00 pm, FSMW		NC State	W 80–69	6–0	20 – Perkins	15 – Goodwin	5 – Tied	Chaifetz Arena (0); St. Louis, MO
December 20, 2020*; 7:30 pm, FS1		at Minnesota	L 82–90	6–1	21 – Goodwin	10 – Goodwin	7 – Tied	Williams Arena (0); Minneapolis, MN
December 23, 2020*; 7:00 pm, FSMW		Kansas City	W 62–46	7–1	23 – Goodwin	13 – Goodwin	7 – Collins	Chaifetz Arena (0); St. Louis, MO
Atlantic 10 regular season
December 30, 2020; 6:00 pm, FSMW		Duquesne; Postponed due to positive COVID-19 tests						Chaifetz Arena; St. Louis, MO
January 9, 2021; 5:00 pm, NBCSN	No. 23	at Saint Joseph's; Postponed due to positive COVID-19 tests						Hagan Arena; Philadelphia, PA
January 15, 2021; 6:00 pm, ESPN2	No. 24	Davidson; Postponed due to positive COVID-19 tests						Chaifetz Arena; St. Louis, MO
January 20, 2021; 5:00 pm, FSMW	No. 25	at UMass; Postponed due to positive COVID-19 tests						Mullins Center; Amherst, MA
January 26, 2021; 7:00 pm, CBSSN	No. 22	Dayton	L 71–76	7–2 (0–1)	20 – Perkins	11 – Goodwin	11 – Collins	Chaifetz Arena (0); St. Louis, MO
January 29, 2021; 5:30 pm, ESPN2	No. 22	at Richmond; Postponed due to positive COVID-19 tests.						Robins Center; Richmond, VA
February 3, 2021; 6:00 pm, ESPN+		at La Salle	L 75–82	7–3 (0–2)	13 – Perkins	9 – Thatch Jr.	4 – Thatch Jr.	Tom Gola Arena (0); Philadelphia, PA
February 6, 2021; 1:00 pm, CBSSN		St. Bonaventure	W 70–59	8–3 (1–2)	21 – Perkins	7 – French	4 – Tied	Chaifetz Arena (0); St. Louis, MO
February 10, 2021; 8:00 pm, CBSSN		Rhode Island	W 67–60	9–3 (2–2)	17 – Goodwin	13 – French	6 – Goodwin	Chaifetz Arena (0); St. Louis, MO
February 13, 2021; 2:30 pm, CBSSN		at Fordham	W 68–40	10–3 (3–2)	19 – Perkins	11 – French	5 – Goodwin	Rose Hill Gymnasium (0); Bronx, NY
February 16, 2021; 8:00 pm, CBSSN		La Salle	W 78–57	11–3 (4–2)	19 – Perkins	15 – Goodwin	8 – Goodwin	Chaifetz Arena (0); St. Louis, MO
February 19, 2021; 6:00 pm, ESPN2		at Dayton	L 53–76	11–4 (4–3)	8 – Hargrove	8 – Goodwin	4 – Collins	UD Arena (0); Dayton, OH
February 23, 2021; 5:00 pm, CBSSN		at VCU	L 65–67	11–5 (4–4)	21 – French	12 – Goodwin	3 – Tied	Siegel Center (250); Richmond, VA
February 26, 2021; 6:00 pm, ESPN2		Richmond	W 72–67	12–5 (5–4)	15 – Tied	9 – French	9 – Collins	Chaifetz Arena (0); St. Louis, MO
March 1, 2021; 6:00 pm, CBSSN		UMass	W 78–57	13–5 (6–4)	16 – Perkins	11 – Goodwin	8 – Goodwin	Chaifetz Arena; St. Louis, MO
A-10 tournament
March 5, 2021; 12:00 pm, NBCSN	(4)	vs. (5) UMass; Quarterfinals	W 86–72	14–5	25 – Perkins	14 – Goodwin	5 – Collins	Robins Center (250); Richmond, VA
March 6, 2021; 5:00 pm, CBSSN	(4)	vs. (1) St. Bonaventure; Semifinals	L 53–71	14–6	11 – Goodwin	7 – Goodwin	9 – Collins	Siegel Center (250); Richmond, VA
NIT
March 20, 2021; 4:00 pm, ESPN	(1)	vs. (4) Mississippi State; First Round – Saint Louis bracket	L 68–74	14–7	21 – Perkins	10 – French	6 – Goodwin	Comerica Center (751); Frisco, TX
*Non-conference game. ^{#}Rankings from AP Poll. (#) Tournament seedings in parentheses. All times are in Central Time.

== Rankings ==
Ranking movements Legend: ██ Increase in ranking ██ Decrease in ranking — = Not ranked RV = Received votes т = Tied with team above or below
	Week																		
Poll	Pre	1	2	3	4	5	6	7	8	9	10	11	12	13	14	15	16	17	Final
AP	RV	RV	RV	RV	RV	RV	23т	24	25	22	RV	RV	RV						
Coaches	—		RV	RV	RV	RV	23	24т	RV	24	RV	RV	RV						

*AP does not release post-NCAA Tournament rankings
