= 2020–21 VCU Rams men's basketball team =

American college basketball season

2020–21 VCU Rams men's basketball

NCAA tournament, first round (Note: The game was declared a no-contest.)
- Conference: Atlantic 10 Conference
- Record: 19–7 (10–4 A-10)
- Head coach: Mike Rhoades (4th season)
- Assistant coaches: J. D. Byers; Brent Scott; Jamal Brunt
- Home arena: Stuart C. Siegel Center

2020–21 Atlantic 10 men's basketball standings
	Conf.				Overall
Team	W		L	PCT	W		L	PCT
St. Bonaventure†	11	–	4	.733	16	–	5	.762
VCU	10	–	4	.714	19	–	7	.731
Davidson	7	–	4	.636	13	–	9	.591
Saint Louis	6	–	4	.600	14	–	7	.667
UMass	6	–	4	.600	8	–	7	.533
George Mason	8	–	6	.571	13	–	9	.591
Dayton	9	–	7	.563	14	–	10	.583
Richmond	6	–	5	.545	14	–	9	.609
Duquesne	7	–	7	.500	9	–	9	.500
Rhode Island	7	–	10	.412	10	–	15	.400
George Washington	3	–	5	.375	5	–	12	.294
La Salle	6	–	11	.353	9	–	16	.360
Saint Joseph's	3	–	9	.250	5	–	15	.250
Fordham	2	–	11	.154	2	–	12	.143
† 2021 A10 Tournament winner

The 2020–21 VCU Rams men's basketball team represented Virginia Commonwealth University during the 2020–21 NCAA Division I men's basketball season. Their head coach was Mike Rhoades, in his fourth year as VCU head coach. The team played their home games at the Siegel Center in Richmond, Virginia, as a member of the Atlantic 10 Conference. In a season limited due to the ongoing COVID-19 pandemic, they finished the season 19–7, 10–4 in A-10 play to finish in second place. The Rams defeated Dayton and Davidson in the A-10 tournament before losing to St. Bonaventure in the championship. They received an at-large bid to the NCAA tournament as the No. 10 seed in the West region. Their game against Oregon in the first round was ruled a no-contest due to positive COVID-19 tests in the VCU program, thus ending their season and making VCU the first team ever to forfeit a game in the NCAA tournament.

== Previous season ==
The Rams finished the 2019–20 season 18–13, 8–10 in A-10 play to finish in a tie for eighth place. As the No. 8 seed in the A-10 tournament, they were to play UMass in the second round, but the tournament was canceled due to the ongoing COVID-19 pandemic.

VCU began the season with a 6–0 record for the first time in program history, and were ranked as high as 20th in the nation. The Rams finished the season with a 2–7 record in their final nine games.

== Offseason ==
=== Departures ===
Name	Number	Pos.	Height	Weight	Year	Hometown	Notes
De'Riante Jenkins	0	G	6'5"	190	Senior	Eutawville, South Carolina	Graduated
Mike'L Simms	1	G/F	6'5"	210	Senior	Richmond, Virginia	Graduated
Marcus Evans	2	G	6'2"	190	RS-Senior	Chesapeake, Virginia	Graduated
Malik Crowfield	13	G	6'4"	190	Senior	LaPlace, Louisiana	Graduated
Marcus Santos-Silva	14	F	6'7"	250	Junior	Taunton, Massachusetts	Graduate transferred to Texas Tech
Issac Vann	23	F	6'6"	200	RS-Senior	Bridgeport, Connecticut	Graduated

=== Incoming transfers ===
Name	Number	Pos.	Height	Weight	Year	Hometown	Notes
Brendan Medley-Bacon	34	C	7'1"	240	Junior	Baltimore, Maryland	Transferred from Coppin State
Levi Stockard III	35	F	6'8"	245	Senior	St. Louis, Missouri	Transferred from Kansas State

=== 2020 recruiting class ===
College recruiting
Name	Hometown	School	Height	Weight	Commit date
Ace Baldwin Jr. PG	Baltimore, MD	St. Frances Academy	6 ft 0 in (1.83 m)	170 lb (77 kg)	Nov 13, 2019
Ace Baldwin Jr. PG	Recruit ratings: Scout: Rivals: 247Sports: (80)				
Josh Banks; SF	Charlotte, NC	Olympic High School	6 ft 5 in (1.96 m)	185 lb (84 kg)	Sep 1, 2019
Josh Banks; SF	Recruit ratings: Scout: Rivals: 247Sports: (78)				
Mikeal Brown-Jones; PF	Philadelphia, PA	IMG Academy	6 ft 8 in (2.03 m)	215 lb (98 kg)	Nov 13, 2019
Mikeal Brown-Jones; PF	Recruit ratings: Scout: Rivals: 247Sports: (79)				
Jamir Watkins; SF	Trenton, NJ	Trenton Catholic	6 ft 7 in (2.01 m)	200 lb (91 kg)	Nov 13, 2019
Jamir Watkins; SF	Recruit ratings: Scout: Rivals: 247Sports: (NR)				
Overall recruit ranking:
Note: In many cases, Scout, Rivals, 247Sports, On3, and ESPN may conflict in their listings of height and weight.; In these cases, the average was taken. ESPN grades are on a 100-point scale.; Sources: "VCU 2020 Player Commits". ESPN.; "2020 Team Ranking". Rivals.

=== 2021 Recruiting class ===
College recruiting (2021)
Name	Hometown	School	Height	Weight	Commit date
Jalen DeLoach; PF	Savannah, GA	The Skill Factory	6 ft 9 in (2.06 m)	190 lb (86 kg)	Nov 11, 2020
Jalen DeLoach; PF	Recruit ratings: Scout: Rivals: 247Sports: (77)				
Nick Kern; SF	St. Louis, MO	Vashon High School	6 ft 5 in (1.96 m)	180 lb (82 kg)	Nov 11, 2020
Nick Kern; SF	Recruit ratings: Scout: Rivals: 247Sports: (86)				
Overall recruit ranking:
Note: In many cases, Scout, Rivals, 247Sports, On3, and ESPN may conflict in their listings of height and weight.; In these cases, the average was taken. ESPN grades are on a 100-point scale.; Sources: "VCU 2021 Player Commits". ESPN.; "2021 Team Ranking". Rivals.

== Preseason ==
=== Atlantic 10 media poll ===
The Atlantic 10 men's basketball media poll was released on November 9, 2020. VCU was picked to finish ninth.

A10 Preseason Poll
Predicted finish	Team
1	Richmond (19)
2	Saint Louis (7)
3	Dayton (2)
4	St. Bonaventure
5	Duquesne
6	Rhode Island
7	Davidson
8	UMass
9	VCU
10	George Mason
11	George Washington
12	Saint Joseph's
13	La Salle
14	Fordham

== Roster ==
2020–21 VCU Rams men's basketball team
Players
Coaches

Pos.	#	Name	Height	Weight	Year	Previous school	Hometown
F	0	Jamir Watkins	6 ft 7 in (2.01 m)	205 lb (93 kg)	Fr	Trenton Catholic	Trenton, New Jersey
G	1	Ace Baldwin Jr.	6 ft 1 in (1.85 m)	190 lb (86 kg)	Fr	St. Frances Academy	Baltimore, Maryland
F	2	Mikeal Brown-Jones	6 ft 8 in (2.03 m)	220 lb (100 kg)	Fr	IMG Academy	Philadelphia, Pennsylvania
G	5	Bones Hyland	6 ft 3 in (1.91 m)	173 lb (78 kg)	So	St. Georges Technical	Wilmington, Delaware
F	10	Vince Williams Jr.	6 ft 6 in (1.98 m)	220 lb (100 kg)	Jr	St. John's Jesuit	Toledo, Ohio
G	11	KeShawn Curry	6 ft 4 in (1.93 m)	175 lb (79 kg)	Jr	Fork Union Military Academy	Jacksonville, Florida
G	12	Jimmy Clark III	6 ft 3 in (1.91 m)	175 lb (79 kg)	So	Newton HS	Covington, Georgia
F	13	Corey Douglas Jr.	6 ft 8 in (2.03 m)	210 lb (95 kg)	RS Sr	Ballard (Louisville); Tallahassee CC	Louisville, Kentucky
G	15	Arnold Henderson VI	5 ft 10 in (1.78 m)	175 lb (79 kg)	So	St. Christopher's School	Mechanicsville, Virginia
F	20	Hason Ward	6 ft 9 in (2.06 m)	210 lb (95 kg)	So	Springfield Central HS	Saint Thomas, Barbados
G	21	Jarren McAllister (injured) (redshirt)	6 ft 4 in (1.93 m)	205 lb (93 kg)	So	Massanutten Military Academy	Wake Forest, North Carolina
G	33	Josh Banks	6 ft 5 in (1.96 m)	170 lb (77 kg)	Fr	Olympic	Charlotte, North Carolina
F	34	Levi Stockard III	6 ft 8 in (2.03 m)	245 lb (111 kg)	Sr	Kansas State	St. Louis, Missouri
C	35	Brendan Medley-Bacon	7 ft 1 in (2.16 m)	240 lb (109 kg)	Jr	Coppin State	Baltimore, Maryland

Head coach

- Mike Rhoades (Lebanon Valley)

Assistant coach(es)

- J. D. Byers (Lebanon Valley)
- Brent Scott (Rice)
- Jamal Brunt (Randolph–Macon)

Legend

- (C) Team captain
- (S) Suspended
- (I) Ineligible
- (W) Walk-on
- Injured
- Current redshirt

Roster

=== Depth chart ===
Pos.	Starting 5	Bench 1	Bench 2	Bench 3
C	Corey Douglas Jr.	Brendan Medley-Bacon	Mikeal Brown-Jones
PF	Levi Stockard III	Hason Ward
SF	Vince Williams Jr.	Jamir Watkins
SG	Bones Hyland	KeShawn Curry	Josh Banks
PG	Ace Baldwin Jr.	Jimmy Clark III*	Jarren McAllister	Arnold Henderson VI

=== Suspension of Jimmy Clark III ===
On February 3, 2021, in a post-game conference, head coach Mike Rhoades said that Jimmy Clark III was absent for the Rams' game against Rhode Island due to a "university suspension." Rhoades then said that he would "leave it at that" for the time being. On February 4, the university confirmed that Clark was no longer with the program, not giving more detail and indicating they were "not allowed to comment further on this matter."

== Schedule and results ==
VCU originally had games scheduled against Charlotte, Tennessee, and LSU that were canceled due to positive COVID-19 tests. Additionally, a game against Louisiana that was canceled due to NCAA scheduling limitations.

Date time, TV	Rank^{#}	Opponent^{#}	Result	Record	High points	High rebounds	High assists	Site (attendance) city, state
Non-conference regular season
November 25, 2020*; 7:00 p.m., ESPN2		vs. Utah State; Crossover Classic quarterfinals	W 85–69	1–0	23 – Hyland	6 – Curry	7 – Baldwin	Sanford Pentagon (0); Sioux Falls, SD
November 26, 2020*; 2:30 pm, ESPN		vs. No. 15 West Virginia; Crossover Classic semifinals	L 66–78	1–1	13 – Hyland	4 – Watkins	6 – Baldwin	Sanford Pentagon (0); Sioux Falls, SD
November 27, 2020*; 9:00 p.m., ESPN2		vs. Memphis; Crossover Classic third place game	W 70–59	2–1	15 – Williams	7 – Ward	6 – Baldwin	Sanford Pentagon (0); Sioux Falls, SD
December 2, 2020*; 5:00 p.m., FS1		at Penn State	L 69–72	2–2	13 – Stockard III	6 – Hyland	6 – Baldwin	Bryce Jordan Center (283); University Park, PA
December 5, 2020*; 2:00 p.m., ESPN+		Mount St. Mary's	W 60–42	3–2	14 – Hyland	5 – Ward	5 – Baldwin	Siegel Center (250); Richmond, VA
December 9, 2020*; 7:00 p.m., ESPN+		North Carolina A&T	W 95–59	4–2	30 – Hyland	8 – Williams	5 – Baldwin	Siegel Center (250); Richmond, VA
December 12, 2020*; 5:00 p.m., NBCSN		Old Dominion; ODU Rivalry	W 77–54	5–2	15 – Hyland	8 – Williams	2 – Tied	Siegel Center (250); Richmond, VA
December 15, 2020*; 7:00 p.m., MASN		Western Carolina	W 93–68	6–2	31 – Hyland	6 – Williams	4 – Williams	Siegel Center (250); Richmond, VA
December 22, 2020*; 4:00 p.m., MASN		James Madison	W 82–81	7–2	15 – Tied	8 – Williams	10 – Baldwin	Siegel Center (250); Richmond, VA
Atlantic 10 regular season
December 30, 2020; 12:00 p.m., ESPN+		at Saint Joseph's	W 80–64	8–2 (1–0)	17 – Williams	7 – Williams	3 – Williams	Hagan Arena (0); Philadelphia, PA
January 6, 2021; 7:00 p.m., MASN		at George Mason; Mason Rivalry	W 66–61	9–2 (2–0)	23 – Hyland	10 – Hyland	3 – Williams	EagleBank Arena (250); Fairfax, VA
January 9, 2021; 2:00 p.m., CBSSN		Rhode Island	L 68–83	9–3 (2–1)	24 – Hyland	6 – Williams	5 – Clark	Siegel Center (250); Richmond, VA
January 13, 2021; 6:00 p.m., ESPN+		at George Washington	W 84–77	10–3 (3–1)	17 – Hyland	5 – Williams	8 – Baldwin	Smith Center (0); Washington, DC
January 20, 2021; 6:00 p.m., CBSSN		at St. Bonaventure	L 54–70	10–4 (3–2)	16 – Hyland	10 – Ward	3 – Clark	Reilly Center (0); Olean, NY
January 23, 2021; 4:30 p.m., CBSSN		Dayton	W 66–43	11–4 (4–2)	28 – Hyland	6 – Tied	5 – Baldwin	Siegel Center (250); Richmond, VA
January 30, 2021; 1:00 p.m., NBCSN		La Salle	W 73–62	12–4 (5–2)	24 – Hyland	10 – Ward	4 – Tied	Siegel Center (250); Richmond, VA
February 3, 2021; 7:00 pm, ESPN+		at Rhode Island	W 63–62	13–4 (6–2)	23 – Hyland	9 – Ward	6 – Baldwin	Ryan Center (0); Kingston, RI
February 9, 2021; 5:00 p.m., CBSSN		at Dayton	W 76–67	14–4 (7–2)	19 – Hyland	5 – Hyland	4 – Ward	UD Arena (0); Dayton, OH
February 12, 2021; 7:00 p.m., ESPN2		St. Bonaventure	W 67–64	15–4 (8–2)	22 – Hyland	9 – Williams	4 – Baldwin	Siegel Center (250); Richmond, VA
February 17, 2021; 7:00 pm, CBSSN		Richmond; Capital City Classic	W 68–56	16–4 (9–2)	20 – Hyland	12 – Hyland	6 – Hyland	Siegel Center (250); Richmond, VA
February 20, 2021; 2:30 p.m., NBCSN		George Mason; Mason Rivalry	L 76–79 ^{OT}	16–5 (9–3)	17 – Hyland	7 – Williams	5 – Williams	Siegel Center (250); Richmond, VA
February 23, 2021; 6:00 pm, CBSSN		Saint Louis	W 67–65	17–5 (10–3)	16 – Williams	9 – Williams	7 – Baldwin	Siegel Center (250); Richmond, VA
February 27, 2021; 2:00 pm, ESPNU		at Davidson	L 57–65	17–6 (10–4)	14 – Watkins	10 – Tied	3 – Williams	John M. Belk Arena (225); Davidson, NC
Atlantic 10 tournament
March 5, 2021; 3:30 pm, NBCSN	(2)	(7) Dayton; Quarterfinals	W 73–68	18–6	30 – Hyland	10 – Hyland	3 – Hyland	Siegel Center (250); Richmond, VA
March 6, 2021; 9:00 pm, CBSSN	(2)	(3) Davidson; Semifinals	W 64–52	19–6	12 – Hyland	7 – Stockard III	7 – Baldwin	Siegel Center (250); Richmond, VA
March 14, 2021; 1:00 pm, CBS	(2)	vs. (1) St. Bonaventure; Championship	L 65–74	19–7	21 – Hyland	9 – Williams	3 – Baldwin	UD Arena (1,500); Dayton, OH
NCAA tournament
March 20, 2021; 9:57 pm, TNT	(10 W)	vs. (7 W) Oregon; First Round	Declared a no-contest due to COVID-19 protocols					Indiana Farmers Coliseum; Indianapolis, IN
*Non-conference game. ^{#}Rankings from AP Poll. (#) Tournament seedings in parentheses. All times are in Eastern Time.

== Rankings ==
Ranking movements Legend: ██ Increase in ranking ██ Decrease in ranking — = Not ranked RV = Received votes
	Week																			
Poll	Pre	1	2	3	4	5	6	7	8	9	10	11	12	13	14	15	16	17	18	Final
AP	—	—	—	—	—	—	—	—	—	—	—	—	RV	RV	—	—	—			Not released
Coaches	—	—	—	—	—	—	—	—	—	—	—	—	—	RV	RV	—	—			

*AP does not release post-NCAA Tournament rankings

== Statistics ==
No.	Player	GP	GS	MPG	FG%	3FG%	FT%	RPG	APG	SPG	BPG	PPG
0	Jamir Watkins	9	0	15.4	.476	.357	.722	2.8	0.222	0.777	0.111	7.0
1	Ace Baldwin Jr.	9	9	25.6								5.2
2	Mikeal Brown-Jones	9	0	9.9	.500							3.9
5	Bones Hyland	9	9	27.9	.444							18.2
10	Vince Williams Jr.	9	5	26.2								10.6
11	KeShawn Curry	5	4	24.6								9.4
12	Jimmy Clark III	9	0	16.6								6.9
13	Corey Douglas	9	9	20.4								5.8
15	Arnold Henderson	3	0	1.7								0.0
20	Hason Ward	9	0	16.6								5.4
21	Jarren McAllister	0	0	0.0	0.000	0.000	0.000	0.000	0.000	0.000	0.000	0.0
33	Josh Banks	9	0	10.2								3.3
34	Levi Stockard	9	9	13.9								5.8
35	Brendan Medley	6	0	4.7								0.2

== See also ==
- 2020–21 VCU Rams women's basketball team
