= 2021 National Invitation Tournament =

College basketball postseason tournament

- Season: 2020–21
- Teams: 16
- Finals site: Comerica Center, Frisco, Texas
- Champions: Memphis Tigers (2nd title)
- Runner-up: Mississippi State Bulldogs (1st title game)
- Semifinalists: Louisiana Tech Bulldogs (2nd semifinal); Colorado State Rams (2nd semifinal)
- Winning coach: Penny Hardaway (1st title)
- MVP: Landers Nolley II (Memphis)

The 2021 National Invitation Tournament was a single-elimination tournament of 16 NCAA Division I men's college basketball teams that had not been selected to participate in the 2021 NCAA tournament. The Tournament began on March 17 and ended on March 28. All rounds were played at the Comerica Center in Frisco, Texas or the UNT Coliseum in Denton, Texas. First-round games began on Wednesday, March 17, and was played through Saturday, March 20. Quarterfinals also took place Thursday, March 25. The semifinals and championship took place Saturday and Sunday, March 27 and 28. The 2021 tournament also featured a third-place game Sunday, March 28, which had not been played at the NIT since 2003. Also, the final game to be played was not the championship, but, rather, the third-place game. This was the first NIT in which the semifinals and final were not played in New York City.

== Participants ==
Teams and pairings for the 2021 NIT were released by the NIT Committee at 8:30 p.m. Eastern time Sunday, March 14, on ESPNU. Because of the reduced field size, halved from 2019's tournament field, all 16 teams were selected as at-large participants, and there were no automatic qualifiers for the 2021 NIT. In 2019, Texas won the NIT title. The 2020 tournament was canceled due to the COVID-19 pandemic.

=== Automatic qualifiers ===
There were no automatic qualifiers in the 2021 NIT due to the reduced field size.

=== At-large bids ===
The following teams were awarded NIT berths.

Team	Conference	Overall record	Appearance	Last bid
Boise State	Mtn West	18–8	7th	2018
Buffalo	MAC	16–8	2nd	2005
Colorado State	Mtn West	18–6	10th	2017
Davidson	Atlantic 10	13–8	9th	2019
Dayton	Atlantic 10	14–9	26th	2019
Louisiana Tech	C–USA	21–7	10th	2015
Memphis	American	16–8	19th	2019
Mississippi State	SEC	15–14	10th	2018
NC State	ACC	13–10	13th	2019
Ole Miss	SEC	16–11	13th	2017
Richmond	Atlantic 10	13–8	10th	2017
Saint Louis	Atlantic 10	14–6	19th	2004
Saint Mary's	WCC	14–9	7th	2018
SMU	American	11–5	4th	2014
Toledo	MAC	21–8	10th	2019
Western Kentucky	C–USA	20–7	15th	2018

== Bracket ==
The field of 16 teams was announced on March 14 on ESPNU.

First round March 17–20
1	Colorado State	75
4	Buffalo	73
March 19; March 18
2	Davidson	61
3	NC State	75
1	Memphis	71
4	Dayton	60
March 20; March 18
2	Boise State	85
3	SMU	84
1	Saint Louis	68
4	Mississippi State	74
March 20; March 17
2	Richmond	76
3	Toledo	66
1	Ole Miss	61
4	Louisiana Tech	70
March 19; March 17
2	Saint Mary's	67
3	Western Kentucky	69

Quarterfinals; March 25
1	Colorado State	65
3	NC State	61
1	Memphis	59
2	Boise State	56
4	Mississippi State	68
2	Richmond	67
4	Louisiana Tech	72
3	Western Kentucky	65

Semifinals; March 27
1	Colorado State	67
1	Memphis	90
4	Mississippi State	84
4	Louisiana Tech	62

Final; March 28
1	Memphis	77
4	Mississippi State	64
Third-place game March 28
1	Colorado State	74
4	Louisiana Tech	76

== Media ==
ESPN, Inc. broadcast all NIT games on ESPN or ESPN2. The semifinals and finals were broadcast on ESPN. Westwood One had exclusive radio rights to the semifinals and the championship.

== See also ==
- 2021 Women's National Invitation Tournament
