= Blake Francis =

American basketball player (born 1998)

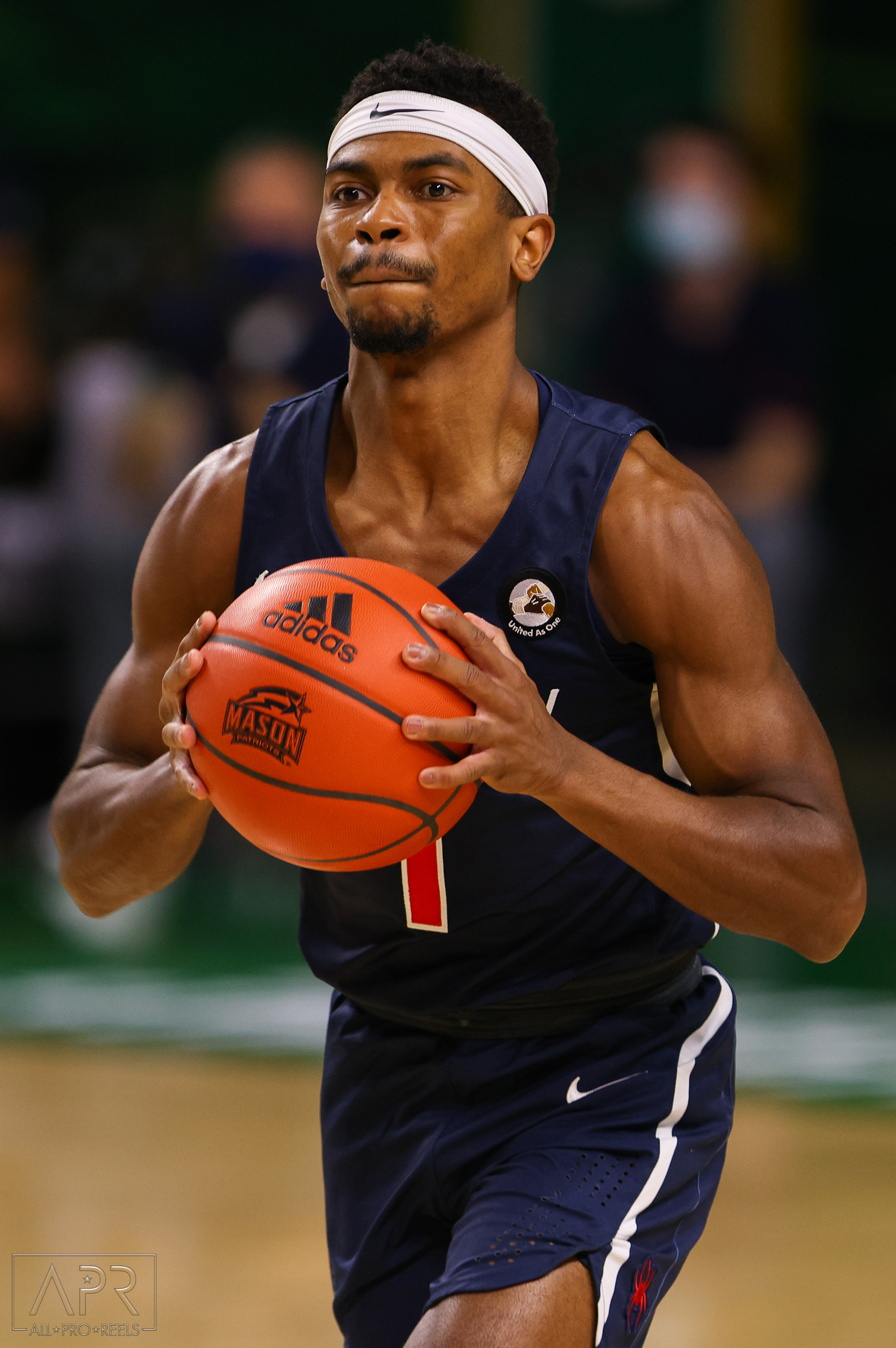
- Francis with Richmond in 2021

No. 5 – New Basket Brindisi
- Position: Point guard
- League: Serie A2

Personal information
- Born: January 3, 1998 (age 28) Herndon, Virginia, U.S.
- Listed height: 6 ft 0 in (1.83 m)
- Listed weight: 175 lb (79 kg)

Career information
- High school: Bishop O'Connell (Arlington, Virginia); Westfield (Chantilly, Virginia)
- College: Wagner (2016–2018); Richmond (2019–2021)
- NBA draft: 2021: undrafted
- Playing career: 2021–present

Career history
- 2021–2022: Westchester Knicks
- 2022: Newfoundland Growlers
- 2022: Capital City Go-Go
- 2023: Cleveland Charge
- 2023: Montreal Alliance
- 2023–2024: Medipolis SC Jena
- 2024–2025: Kouvot
- 2025: Elachem Vigevano
- 2025–present: New Basket Brindisi

Career highlights
- 2× Second-team All-Atlantic 10 (2020, 2021); Second-team All-NEC (2018)

Blake Francis (born January 3, 1998) is an American professional basketball player for New Basket Brindisi of the Italian Serie A2. He played college basketball for the Wagner Seahawks and the Richmond Spiders.

== High school career ==
After spending his freshman year at Bishop O'Connell High School in Arlington, Virginia, Francis transferred to Westfield High School in Chantilly, Virginia. As a senior, he averaged 20.1 points per game and led Westfield to the Virginia 6A state championship, scoring 23 points against Oscar F. Smith High School in the title game. He was a Second Team All-State selection. Francis left as Westfield's all-time leading scorer, with 1,390 career points. He planned to attend prep school because he had no NCAA Division I scholarship offers. He accepted an offer from Wagner when a scholarship suddenly became available on the team because two-sport athlete Greg Senat had switched his scholarship from basketball to football.

== College career ==
As a freshman at Wagner, Francis averaged 7.2 points per game in a reserve role. Due to the departures of important players after the season, he was given more opportunities as a sophomore. On February 8, 2018, Francis scored a career-high 29 points in a 96–76 win over Bryant. In his sophomore season, he averaged 17.3 points per game and made a program-record 102 three-pointers. Francis was named to the Second Team All-Northeast Conference. He transferred to Richmond and sat out his next year per National Collegiate Athletic Association rules. He was drawn to Richmond because his friend Cedrick Lindsay had played there and some of his former Amateur Athletic Union teammates were on the roster.

During his redshirt year, he recovered from foot surgery. On December 3, 2019, Francis matched his career-high of 29 points, shooting 6-of-9 from three-point range, in an 80–63 victory over Hampton. On January 11, 2020, he suffered a sternal fracture when diving for a loose ball during a 75–58 loss against Saint Louis and was expected to miss four to six weeks. He returned to action against Fordham on February 8 and finished with 18 points. As a junior, Francis led the team in scoring with 17.7 points per game while also averaging 2.2 rebounds and 2 assists per game. He earned Second Team All-Atlantic 10 honors. He led Richmond to a program-record 14 conference wins. Francis declared for the 2020 NBA draft before withdrawing his name and opting to return to Richmond.

After the 2020–21 season, Francis declined to take an additional year of eligibility granted to all players, instead opting for the 2021 NBA draft.

== Professional career ==
=== Westchester Knicks (2021–2022) ===
Francis was drafted second round (15th pick overall) by the Raptors 905 in the 2021 NBA G League Draft. However, he did not make the team's final roster.

On December 30, 2021, Francis was acquired by the Westchester Knicks of the NBA G League. Francis was then later waived on January 26, 2022.

On February 8, 2022, Francis was acquired by the Raptors 905, but was waived on February 10.

=== Capital City Go-Go (2022) ===
On March 9, Francis was acquired and activated by the Capital City Go-Go off of waivers. He was later waived on November 14, 2022, and then re-acquired on December 3, and then waived again on December 9, 2022.

=== Cleveland Charge (2023) ===
On February 11, 2023, Francis was acquired by the Cleveland Charge.

=== Montreal Alliance (2023) ===
On May 4, 2023, Francis signed with the Montreal Alliance of the Canadian Elite Basketball League. However, he was waived on July 2 after playing 7 games for the club.

=== Medipolis SC Jena (2023–2024) ===
On July 27, 2023, Francis signed with Medipolis SC Jena of the second-tier German ProA for a contract duration of 1 year.

=== Kouvot (2024–2025 ===
On 16 November 2024, Francis signed with Kouvot in Finnish Korisliiga.

=== Elachem Vigevano (2025) ===
On 11 April 2025, he joined Elachem Vigevano in Italian Serie A2.

=== Valtur New Basket Brindisi(2025) ===
In september 2025, he joined New Basket Brindisi in Italian Serie A2.

== Career statistics ==
Legend
GP	Games played	GS	Games started	MPG	Minutes per game
FG%	Field goal percentage	3P%	3-point field goal percentage	FT%	Free throw percentage
RPG	Rebounds per game	APG	Assists per game	SPG	Steals per game
BPG	Blocks per game	PPG	Points per game	**Bold**	Career high

=== College ===
Year	Team	GP	GS	MPG	FG%	3P%	FT%	RPG	APG	SPG	BPG	PPG
2016–17	Wagner	28	3	20.5	.424	**.422**	.750	1.4	1.1	.6	.0	7.2
2017–18	Wagner	**32**	22	**32.7**	**.430**	.402	**.806**	1.9	1.7	**1.6**	.0	17.3
2018–19	Richmond	Redshirt										
2019–20	Richmond	25	**25**	32.7	.417	.363	.805	2.2	2.0	1.1	.0	**17.7**
2020–21	Richmond	20	20	**33.4**	.424	.360	.750	**2.3**	**2.2**	1.4	.0	16.1
Career		105	70	29.6	.424	.386	.787	1.9	1.7	1.2	.0	14.5

== Personal life ==
Francis' older brother, Branden, played college football for Liberty. He is a cousin of former NFL player Marques Hagans and basketball player Tyler Thornton.
