= 2020–21 Richmond Spiders men's basketball team =

2019–20 Richmond Spiders men's basketball

2020–21 Richmond Spiders men's basketball

NIT, Quarterfinals
- Conference: Atlantic 10 Conference
- Record: 14–9 (6–5 A-10)
- Head coach: Chris Mooney (16th season)
- Assistant coaches: Rob Jones; Marcus Jenkins; Steve Thomas
- Home arena: Robins Center

2020–21 Atlantic 10 men's basketball standings
	Conf.				Overall
Team	W		L	PCT	W		L	PCT
St. Bonaventure†	11	–	4	.733	16	–	5	.762
VCU	10	–	4	.714	19	–	7	.731
Davidson	7	–	4	.636	13	–	9	.591
Saint Louis	6	–	4	.600	14	–	7	.667
UMass	6	–	4	.600	8	–	7	.533
George Mason	8	–	6	.571	13	–	9	.591
Dayton	9	–	7	.563	14	–	10	.583
Richmond	6	–	5	.545	14	–	9	.609
Duquesne	7	–	7	.500	9	–	9	.500
Rhode Island	7	–	10	.412	10	–	15	.400
George Washington	3	–	5	.375	5	–	12	.294
La Salle	6	–	11	.353	9	–	16	.360
Saint Joseph's	3	–	9	.250	5	–	15	.250
Fordham	2	–	11	.154	2	–	12	.143
† 2021 A10 Tournament winner

The 2020–21 Richmond Spiders men's basketball team represented the University of Richmond during the 2020–21 NCAA Division I men's basketball season. They were led by 16th-year head coach Chris Mooney and played their home games at the Robins Center as members of the Atlantic 10 Conference. They finished the season 14–9, 6–5 in A-10 play to finish in 8th place. They lost in the quarterfinals of the A-10 tournament to Duquesne. They received an invitation to the NIT where they defeated Toledo in the first round before losing in the quarterfinals to Mississippi State.

== Previous season ==
The Spiders finished the 2019–20 season 24–7, 14–4 in A-10 play to finish in second place. Their season ended when the A-10 tournament and all other postseason tournaments were canceled due to the ongoing coronavirus pandemic.

== Offseason ==
=== Departures ===
Name	Number	Pos.	Height	Weight	Year	Hometown	Reason for departure
Jake Wojcik	11	G	6'4"	190	Sophomore	San Jose, CA	Transfer to Fairfield
Tomas Verbinskis	21	F	6'7"	210	Redshirt Sophomore	Klaipeda, Lithuania	Transfer to Lafayette in December 2019

In addition, guard Nick Sherod suffered a season-ending knee injury during preseason practice in October 2020.

=== Incoming transfer ===
Guard Connor Crabtree transferred to Richmond from Tulane prior to the 2019–20 season and sat out due to NCAA transfer rules. He will become eligible to play for the Spiders in the 2020–21 season.

=== 2020 recruiting class ===
College recruiting information
Name	Hometown	School	Height	Weight	Commit date
Isaiah Wilson; G	Pittsburgh, PA	First Love Academy	6 ft 0 in (1.83 m)	160 lb (73 kg)	Sep 9, 2019
Isaiah Wilson; G	Recruit ratings: Scout: Rivals: 247Sports: (0)				
Andre Weir; F	Hollywood, FL	Chaminade-Madonna	6 ft 10 in (2.08 m)	265 lb (120 kg)	
Andre Weir; F	Recruit ratings: Scout: Rivals: 247Sports: (0)				
Dji Bailey; G	Wilson, NC	Greenfield School	6 ft 5 in (1.96 m)	175 lb (79 kg)	May 11, 2020
Dji Bailey; G	Recruit ratings: Scout: Rivals: 247Sports: (0)				
Quentin Southall; G	Alexandria, VA	Georgetown Prep (MD)	6 ft 3 in (1.91 m)	180 lb (82 kg)	
Quentin Southall; G	Recruit ratings: Scout: Rivals: 247Sports: (0)				
Overall recruit ranking:
Note: In many cases, Scout, Rivals, 247Sports, On3, and ESPN may conflict in their listings of height and weight.; In these cases, the average was taken. ESPN grades are on a 100-point scale.; Sources: "Rivals.com 2020 Richmond Commitments". Rivals.; "Scout.com 2020 Richmond Commitments". Scout.; "ESPN 2020 Richmond Commitments". ESPN.; "Scout.com Team Recruiting Rankings". Scout.; "2020 Team Ranking". Rivals.

Weir left the program in December 2020 before he played in any games for the Spiders.

== Preseason ==
In a preseason poll of league head coaches and select media members, Richmond was chosen as the favorite to win the Atlantic 10 Conference in 2020–21, taking 19 out of 28 first-place votes. Jacob Gilyard was selected to both the preseason all-conference first team and the preseason all-defensive team, while Blake Francis and Grant Golden were both selected to the preseason all-conference second team.

== Roster ==
2020–21 Richmond Spiders men's basketball team
Players
Coaches

Pos.	#	Name	Height	Weight	Year	Previous school	Hometown
G	0	Jacob Gilyard	5 ft 9 in (1.75 m)	160 lb (73 kg)	Sr	The Barstow School	Kansas City, Missouri
G	1	Blake Francis	6 ft 0 in (1.83 m)	175 lb (79 kg)	GS	Westfield High School; Wagner	Herndon, Virginia
F	2	Souleymane Koureissi	6 ft 9 in (2.06 m)	215 lb (98 kg)	Jr	Iona Prep	Harlem, New York
F	3	Tyler Burton	6 ft 7 in (2.01 m)	215 lb (98 kg)	So	Marianapolis Prep	Uxbridge, Massachusetts
F	4	Nathan Cayo	6 ft 7 in (2.01 m)	225 lb (102 kg)	Sr	Collège Jean-de-Brébeuf	Montreal, Quebec
G	5	Nick Sherod (injured)	6 ft 4 in (1.93 m)	230 lb (104 kg)	GS	St. Christopher's School	Richmond, Virginia
F	10	Sullivan Kulju (W)	6 ft 6 in (1.98 m)	220 lb (100 kg)	Sr	Eisenhower Middle/High School	New Berlin, Wisconsin
G	12	Gabe Arizin (W)	6 ft 4 in (1.93 m)	190 lb (86 kg)	So	St. Joseph's Prep	West Chester, Pennsylvania
G	13	Connor Crabtree	6 ft 6 in (1.98 m)	190 lb (86 kg)	RS So	Hargrave Military Academy; Tulane	Hillsborough, North Carolina
F	15	Matt Grace	6 ft 9 in (2.06 m)	230 lb (104 kg)	Jr	TRC Academy	Hamilton, Ontario
G	21	Isaiah Wilson	6 ft 0 in (1.83 m)	160 lb (73 kg)	Fr	First Love Academy	Pittsburgh, Pennsylvania
G	22	Andre Gustavson	6 ft 4 in (1.93 m)	195 lb (88 kg)	Jr	Helsinki Basketball Academy	Helsinki, Finland
G	24	Dji Bailey	6 ft 5 in (1.96 m)	175 lb (79 kg)	Fr	Greenfield School	Wilson, North Carolina
G	25	Quentin Southall (W)	6 ft 3 in (1.91 m)	180 lb (82 kg)	Fr	Georgetown Prep	Alexandria, Virginia
G	31	Jordan Gaitley (W)	6 ft 4 in (1.93 m)	190 lb (86 kg)	GS	Fordham Preparatory School	Haverford, Pennsylvania
F	33	Grant Golden	6 ft 10 in (2.08 m)	255 lb (116 kg)	GS	St. James School	Winchester, Virginia

Head coach

- Chris Mooney (Princeton)

Assistant coach(es)

- Rob Jones (Toccoa Falls)
- Marcus Jenkins (Air Force)
- Steve Thomas (Rowan)

Legend

- (C) Team captain
- (S) Suspended
- (I) Ineligible
- (W) Walk-on
- Injured
- Current redshirt

Roster
Last update: January 1, 2021

== Schedule and results ==
The Spiders' opening game of the season against Detroit Mercy as part of the Bluegrass Showcase was canceled due to COVID-19 issues within the Detroit Mercy program. Two other non-conference games against Charleston and Furman were canceled due to a COVID-related pause by Richmond.

Richmond experienced two additional COVID-related pauses during the season, resulting in multiple changes to the Atlantic 10 portion of the schedule, while adjustments to the schedule for the 2021 Atlantic 10 men's basketball tournament resulted in additional changes to several teams' schedules over the final two weeks of the regular season.

Date time, TV	Rank^{#}	Opponent^{#}	Result	Record	High points	High rebounds	High assists	Site (attendance) city, state
Regular season
Nov 27, 2020*; 6:00 p.m.		vs. Morehead State; Bluegrass Showcase	W 82–64	1–0	23 – Cayo	12 – Burton	5 – Tied	Rupp Arena (261); Lexington, KY
Nov 29, 2020*; 1:00 p.m., ESPN		at No. 10 Kentucky; Bluegrass Showcase	W 76–64	2–0	18 – Tied	7 – Golden	6 – Gilyard	Rupp Arena (3,075); Lexington, KY
Dec 7, 2020*; 2:00 p.m., ESPN+	No. 19	Wofford	W 77–72	3–0	18 – Gilyard	7 – Burton	6 – Gilyard	Robins Center (0); Richmond, VA
Dec 9, 2020*; 6:00 p.m., NBCS WA/ESPN+	No. 19	Northern Iowa	W 78–68	4–0	21 – Burton	13 – Burton	11 – Gilyard	Robins Center (0); Richmond, VA
Dec 13, 2020*; 1:00 p.m., ESPN	No. 19	at No. 11 West Virginia	L 71–87	4–1	14 – Tied	10 – Burton	6 – Gilyard	WVU Coliseum (371); Morgantown, WV
Dec 16, 2020*; 1:00 p.m., SEC Network		at Vanderbilt	W 78–67	5–1	21 – Francis	8 – Golden	5 – Gilyard	Memorial Gymnasium (0); Nashville, TN
Dec 18, 2020*; 6:00 p.m., NBCS WA/ESPN+		vs. Loyola–Chicago	W 75–73	6–1	27 – Francis	9 – Burton	3 – Gilyard	Indiana Convention Center (0); Indianapolis, IN
Dec 22, 2020*; 2:00 p.m., NBCS WA/ESPN+		Hofstra	L 71–76	6–2	15 – Tied	7 – Burton	6 – Gilyard	Robins Center; Richmond, VA
Dec 30, 2020; 7:00 p.m., CBSSN		at Davidson	W 80–74	7–2 (1–0)	22 – Golden	11 – Burton	5 – Tied	John M. Belk Arena; Davidson, NC
Jan 2, 2021; 5:00 p.m., CBSSN		St. Bonaventure	L 66–69	7–3 (1–1)	21 – Francis	10 – Cayo	6 – Golden	Robins Center; Richmond, VA
Jan 6, 2021; 6:00 p.m., CBSSN		Rhode Island	W 80–73	8–3 (2–1)	22 – Gilyard	9 – Golden	5 – Golden	Robins Center; Richmond, VA
Jan 9, 2021 noon, CBSSN		at George Mason	W 77–57	9–3 (3–1)	18 – Golden	10 – Golden	5 – Gilyard	EagleBank Arena (250); Fairfax, VA
Jan 23, 2021; 2:30 p.m., NBCSN		La Salle	L 78–84	9–4 (3–2)	22 – Golden	12 – Burton	4 – Tied	Robins Center; Richmond, VA
Jan 26, 2021; 6:00 p.m., ESPN+		at Saint Joseph's	W 79–56	10–4 (4–2)	25 – Burton	7 – Golden	7 – Gilyard	Hagan Arena; Philadelphia, PA
Feb 14, 2021*; 6:00 p.m., ESPN+		St. Mary's College (MD)	W 90–49	11–4	17 – Francis	7 – Golden	4 – Golden	Robins Center; Richmond, VA
Feb 17, 2021; 7:00 p.m., CBSSN		at VCU; Capital City Classic	L 56–68	11–5 (4–3)	18 – Cayo	7 – Cayo	5 – Gilyard	Siegel Center (250); Richmond, VA
Feb 20, 2021; 4:30 p.m., NBCSN		Duquesne	W 79–72	12–5 (5–3)	17 – Tied	8 – Tied	8 – Golden	Robins Center; Richmond, VA
Feb 23, 2021; 6:00 p.m., NBCS WA+/ESPN+		Massachusetts	W 79–65	13–5 (6–3)	20 – Francis	9 – Gilyard	6 – Gilyard	Robins Center; Richmond, VA
Feb 26, 2021; 7:00 p.m., ESPN2		at Saint Louis	L 67–72	13–6 (6–4)	24 – Francis	7 – Burton	5 – Golden	Chaifetz Arena; St. Louis, MO
Mar 1, 2021; 6:00 p.m., NBCS WA/ESPN+		Saint Joseph's	L 73–76	13–7 (6–5)	25 – Cayo	8 – Tied	3 – Cayo	Robins Center; Richmond, VA
A-10 tournament
Mar 4, 2021; 11:00 a.m., NBCSN	(8)	(9) Duquesne; Second Round	L 62–67	13–8	18 – Burton	11 – Burton	4 – Gilyard	Siegel Center; Richmond, VA
NIT
Mar 17, 2021*; 7:00 p.m., ESPN2	(2)	vs. (3) Toledo; First Round – Saint Louis bracket	W 76–66	14–8	18 – Tied	10 – Burton	5 – Gilyard	UNT Coliseum (731); Denton, TX
Mar 25, 2021*; 6:00 p.m., ESPN2	(2)	vs. (4) Mississippi State; Quarterfinals – Saint Louis bracket	L 67–68	14–9	22 – Gilyard	5 – Cayo	6 – Gilyard	UNT Coliseum; Denton, TX
*Non-conference game. ^{#}Rankings from AP Poll. (#) Tournament seedings in parentheses. All times are in Eastern Time.

== Rankings ==
Ranking movements Legend: ██ Increase in ranking ██ Decrease in ranking — = Not ranked RV = Received votes
	Week																	
Poll	Pre	1	2	3	4	5	6	7	8	9	10	11	12	13	14	15	16	Final
AP	RV	19	19	RV	RV	RV	—	—	—	—	—	—	—	—	—	—	—	Not released
Coaches	RV	RV*	19	25	23	RV	—	RV	RV	—	—	—	—	—	—	—	—	—

*Coaches did not release a Week 1 poll
