= Bones Hyland =

American basketball player (born 2000)

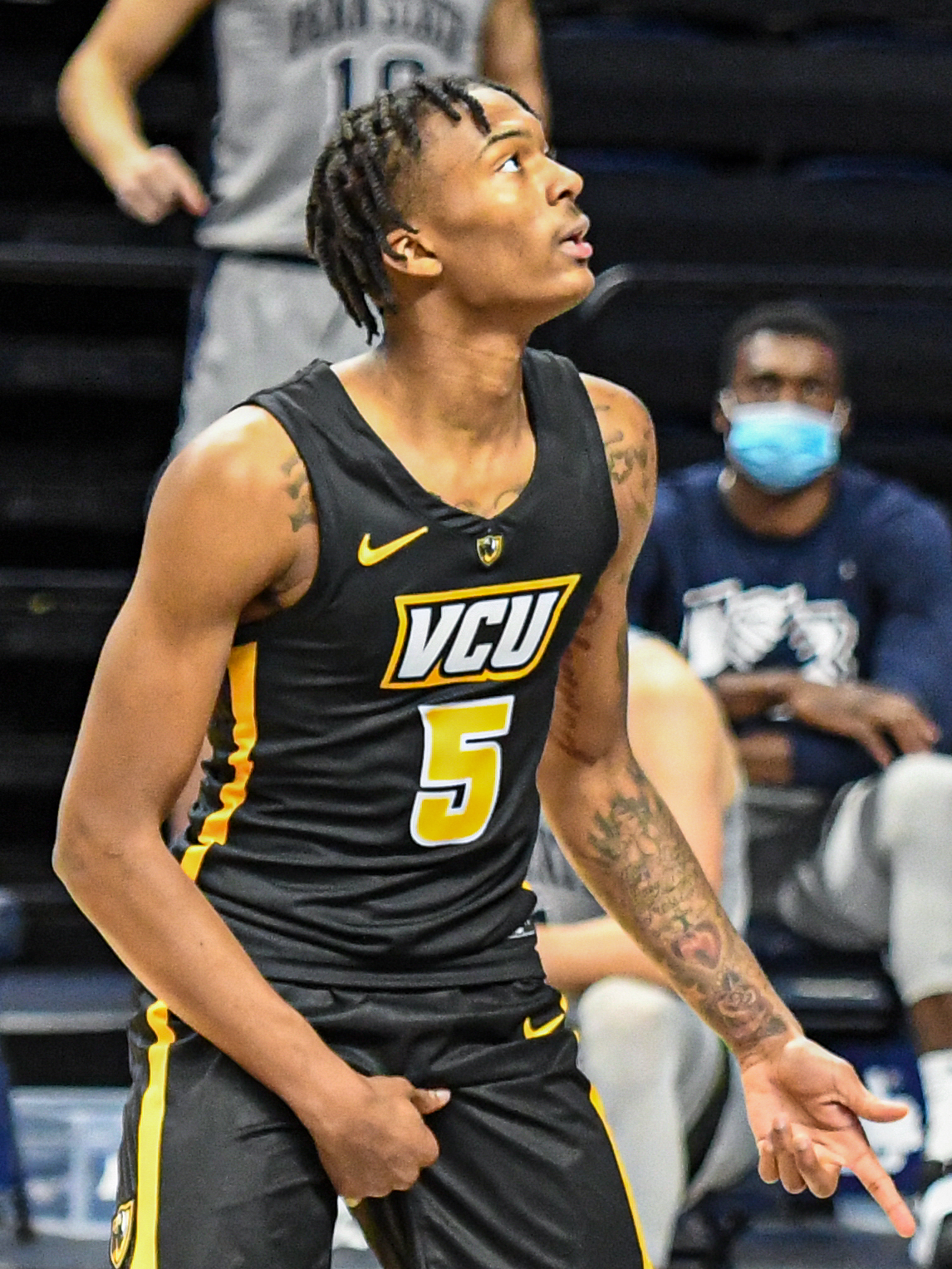
- Hyland with VCU in 2020

No. 8 – Minnesota Timberwolves
- Position: Point guard / shooting guard
- League: NBA

Personal information
- Born: September 14, 2000 (age 26) Wilmington, Delaware, U.S.
- Listed height: 6 ft 2 in (1.88 m)
- Listed weight: 169 lb (77 kg)

Career information
- High school: St. Georges Tech (Middletown, Delaware)
- College: VCU (2019–2021)
- NBA draft: 2021: 1st round, 26th overall pick
- Drafted by: Denver Nuggets
- Playing career: 2021–present

Career history
- 2021–2023: Denver Nuggets
- 2023–2025: Los Angeles Clippers
- 2025–present: Minnesota Timberwolves
- 2025: →Iowa Wolves

Career highlights
- NBA All-Rookie Second Team (2022); Atlantic 10 Player of the Year (2021); First-team All-Atlantic 10 (2021); Atlantic 10 All-Rookie Team (2020)
- Stats at NBA.com
- Stats at Basketball Reference

Nah'Shon Lee "Bones" Hyland (born September 14, 2000) is an American professional basketball player for the Minnesota Timberwolves of the National Basketball Association (NBA). He played college basketball for the VCU Rams before being drafted 26th overall in the 2021 NBA draft by the Denver Nuggets.

== Early life ==
Hyland was born in Delaware. He started playing basketball after watching his older brother and a friend playing at the park. He was nicknamed "Bizzy Bones" or "Bones" in part due to his slender build. Hyland attended St. Georges Technical High School in Middletown, Delaware. During his junior year, on March 25, 2018, his 11-month-old cousin and grandmother died in a house fire. Hyland escaped by jumping from his second-floor bedroom and suffered a torn patellar tendon, sidelining him for six months. As a senior, he averaged 26.6 points, 6.6 rebounds, 4.6 assists and 3.4 steals per game, leading his team to the semifinals of the state tournament. He was named Delaware Player of the Year and earned first team All-State honors. A four-star recruit, he committed to playing college basketball for VCU over offers from Saint Joseph's, Rhode Island, La Salle, Boston College, UConn, and Temple.

== College career ==
On January 18, 2020, Hyland scored a freshman season-high 21 points and five three-pointers in a 91–63 win over St. Bonaventure. As a freshman, he averaged nine points, 2.2 rebounds and 1.8 assists per game, earning Atlantic 10 All-Rookie Team accolades. He shot 43.4 percent from three-point range and set a program freshman record with 63 three-pointers. In his sophomore season debut on November 25, Hyland scored 23 points, making five three-pointers, in an 85–69 victory over Utah State. On December 9, he scored 30 points, shooting 7-of-12 from three-point range, in a 95–59 win over North Carolina A&T. Six days later, Hyland posted a career-high 31 points in a 93–68 victory over Western Carolina. On March 5, 2021, he recorded 30 points and 10 rebounds in a 73–68 win against Dayton at the Atlantic 10 tournament quarterfinals. As a sophomore, Hyland averaged 19.5 points, 4.7 rebounds, 2.1 assists and 1.9 steals per game, and was named Atlantic 10 Player of the Year. On April 17, 2021, he declared for the 2021 NBA draft, forgoing his remaining college eligibility.

== Professional career ==
=== Denver Nuggets (2021–2023) ===
On July 29, 2021, Hyland was drafted with the 26th overall pick in the 2021 NBA draft by the Denver Nuggets, becoming VCU's first draft pick in 11 years. On January 15, 2022, Hyland scored a then career-high 27 points and had 10 rebounds in a 133–96 win against the Los Angeles Lakers. On April 24, in the first round of the playoffs, Hyland helped the Nuggets to a 126–121 Game 4 victory over the Golden State Warriors, with 15 points and 7 assists. Although Hyland played 42 games with the 2022-23 Nuggets and averaged more than 11 points per game before his trade, he was excluded from receiving a championship ring when Denver won the NBA title after sending him to the Clippers.

=== Los Angeles Clippers (2023–2025) ===
On February 9, 2023, Hyland was traded to the Los Angeles Clippers in a four-team trade involving the Los Angeles Lakers and Orlando Magic.

On April 10, 2024, in a 124–108 loss against the Phoenix Suns, Hyland scored a new career-high 37 points.

=== Minnesota Timberwolves (2025–present) ===
On February 6, 2025, Hyland and Terance Mann were traded to the Atlanta Hawks in exchange for guard Bogdan Bogdanović, and three second-round draft picks. He was waived the next day. On February 27, Hyland signed a two-way contract with the Minnesota Timberwolves. In four appearances for Minnesota, he averaged 1.3 points, 0.3 rebounds, and 1.0 assist.

On September 15, 2025, Hyland re-signed with the Timberwolves on a one-year minimum contract. He would have a resurgence for the Timberwolves, becoming a key contributor off the bench, averaging 8.5 points and 2.6 assists in 16.6 minutes per game. On June 30, 2026, Hyland re-signed with the Timberwolves on another one-year minimum contract.

== Career statistics ==
Legend
GP	Games played	GS	Games started	MPG	Minutes per game
FG%	Field goal percentage	3P%	3-point field goal percentage	FT%	Free throw percentage
RPG	Rebounds per game	APG	Assists per game	SPG	Steals per game
BPG	Blocks per game	PPG	Points per game	**Bold**	Career high

=== NBA ===
==== Regular season ====
Year	Team	GP	GS	MPG	FG%	3P%	FT%	RPG	APG	SPG	BPG	PPG
2021–22	Denver	69	4	19.0	.403	.366	.856	2.7	2.8	.6	**.3**	10.1
2022–23	Denver	42	1	**19.5**	.399	.378	.866	2.0	3.0	.7	**.3**	**12.1**
2022–23	L.A. Clippers	14	0	18.9	.401	.351	.750	**3.5**	**3.4**	.8	.1	10.8
2023–24	L.A. Clippers	37	**5**	14.6	.386	.326	.783	1.5	2.5	.7	.1	6.9
2024–25	L.A. Clippers	20	0	11.1	.391	.388	**.885**	1.2	1.4	**.9**	.2	7.2
2024–25	Minnesota	4	0	4.3	**.667**	**.500**	—	.3	1.0	.0	.0	1.3
2025–26	Minnesota	**71**	3	16.6	.453	.388	.780	1.8	2.6	.6	.2	8.5
Career		257	13	16.9	.411	.370	.832	2.1	2.6	.7	.2	9.2

==== Playoffs ====
Year	Team	GP	GS	MPG	FG%	3P%	FT%	RPG	APG	SPG	BPG	PPG
2022	Denver	5	0	**17.3**	.361	**.348**	.857	**2.0**	**3.2**	.2	.0	**9.2**
2023	L.A. Clippers	5	0	16.5	.341	.250	.800	.8	.8	**.8**	**.2**	8.6
2024	L.A. Clippers	3	0	4.0	**.429**	.200	**1.000**	.7	1.3	.0	.0	3.7
2026	Minnesota	**10**	0	11.6	.300	.265	.875	1.3	1.5	.4	.1	4.6
Career		23	0	12.9	.336	.280	.861	1.3	1.7	.4	.1	6.3

=== College ===
Year	Team	GP	GS	MPG	FG%	3P%	FT%	RPG	APG	SPG	BPG	PPG
2019–20	VCU	**31**	9	20.6	.433	**.434**	.667	2.2	1.8	.8	**.3**	9.0
2020–21	VCU	24	**24**	**31.9**	**.447**	.371	**.862**	**4.7**	**2.1**	**1.9**	.2	**19.5**
Career		55	33	25.5	.441	.399	.827	3.3	1.9	1.3	.3	13.6
