= Clyde C. Miller Career Academy =

Public high school in St. Louis, Missouri, US

Location
- 1000 N Grand Blvd; St. Louis, Missouri 63106; United States

Information
- Type: Public high school
- School district: St. Louis Public Schools
- Superintendent: Kelvin Adams
- Principal: Jana Haywood
- Staff: 43.00 (FTE)
- Grades: 9–12
- Enrollment: 430 (2024–2025)
- Student to teacher ratio: 10.00
- Campus type: Urban
- Colors: Blue and gold
- Athletics conference: Public High League
- Sports: Track and Field, Football, Basketball, Baseball
- Mascot: Phoenix
- Website: miller.slps.org

Clyde C. Miller Career Academy is a public high school located in St. Louis, Missouri in the Grand Central Arts District of Midtown. The academy is a magnet school providing students a traditional academic program as well as in-depth exposure in a Career and Technical program.

== Overview ==
97% of Clyde C Miller's student body is African-American. 100% of the student body is eligible for Free Lunch.

An attempted senior prank in 2018 on Clyde C. Miller by fellow seniors involving throwing eggs and water balloons resulted in the police being called and several students getting pepper sprayed, with 1 arrest.
