= 2020–21 Memphis Tigers men's basketball team =

American college basketball season

2020–21 Memphis Tigers men's basketball

NIT Champions
- Conference: American Athletic Conference
- Record: 20–8 (11–4 AAC)
- Head coach: Penny Hardaway (3rd season)
- Assistant coaches: Tony Madlock; Jermaine Johnson; Cody Toppert
- Home arena: FedExForum

2020–21 American Athletic Conference men's basketball standings
| | Conf. | | | | Overall |
| Team | W | | L | PCT | W | | L | PCT |
|---|---|---|---|---|---|---|---|---|
| Wichita State | 11 | – | 2 | .846 | 16 | – | 6 | .727 |
| No. 6 Houston † | 14 | – | 3 | .824 | 28 | – | 4 | .875 |
| Memphis | 11 | – | 4 | .733 | 20 | – | 8 | .714 |
| SMU | 7 | – | 4 | .636 | 11 | – | 6 | .647 |
| Cincinnati | 8 | – | 6 | .571 | 12 | – | 11 | .522 |
| UCF | 8 | – | 10 | .444 | 11 | – | 12 | .478 |
| Tulsa | 7 | – | 9 | .438 | 11 | – | 12 | .478 |
| South Florida | 4 | – | 10 | .286 | 9 | – | 13 | .409 |
| Temple | 4 | – | 10 | .286 | 5 | – | 11 | .313 |
| Tulane | 4 | – | 12 | .250 | 10 | – | 13 | .435 |
| East Carolina | 2 | – | 10 | .167 | 8 | – | 11 | .421 |
† 2021 AAC tournament winner Rankings from AP poll

The 2020–21 Memphis Tigers men's basketball team represented the University of Memphis in the 2020–21 NCAA Division I men's basketball season. This is the 100th season of Tiger basketball, the third under head coach Penny Hardaway, and the eighth as members of the American Athletic Conference. They play their home games at the FedEx Forum. They finished the season 20–8, 11–4 to finish in 3rd place. They defeated UCF in the quarterfinals of the AAC Tournament before losing in the semifinals to Houston. They received an invitation to the NIT where they defeated Dayton, Boise State, Colorado State, and Mississippi State to become NIT Champions.

== Previous season ==
The Tigers finished the 2019–20 season 21–10, 10–8 in AAC play to finish in sixth place. They entered as the No. 6 seed in the AAC tournament, which was ultimately cancelled due to the coronavirus pandemic.

== Offseason ==
=== Departures ===
| Name | Number | Pos. | Height | Weight | Year | Hometown | Notes |
|---|---|---|---|---|---|---|---|
| Tyler Harris | 1 | G | 5'9 | 150 | Sophomore | Memphis, TN | Transferred to Iowa State |
| Ryan Boyce | 12 | F | 6'6 | 185 | RS Freshman | Memphis, TN | Transferred to Georgia State (mid-season) |
| Isaiah Maurice | 14 | F | 6'10 | 224 | Senior | Durham, NC | Graduated |
| James Wiseman | 32 | C | 7'1 | 240 | Freshman | Nashville, TN | Left team (mid-season) |
| Precious Achiuwa | 55 | F | 6'9 | 225 | Freshman | Port Harcourt, Nigeria | Declared for NBA draft; selected 20th overall by the Miami Heat |

=== Incoming transfers ===
| Name | Pos. | Height | Weight | Year | Hometown | Notes |
|---|---|---|---|---|---|---|
| Ahmad Rand | F | 6'8" | 180 | Junior | Lincolnton, GA | Junior college transferred from USC Salkehatchie. |
| Landers Nolley II | F | 6'7" | 225 | RS Sophomore | Atlanta, GA | Transferred from Virginia Tech. Nolley was granted a waiver for immediate eligibility. Will have three years of remaining eligibility. |
| DeAndre Williams | F | 6'9" | 190 | Junior | Houston, TX | Transferred from Evansville. Williams was granted a waiver for immediate eligibility on December 16. Will have two years of remaining eligibility. |

=== 2020 recruiting class ===
College recruiting information
| Name | Hometown | School | Height | Weight | Commit date |
|---|---|---|---|---|---|
| Moussa Cissé; C | Conakry, Guinea | Lausanne Collegiate School | 6 ft 11 in (2.11 m) | 210 lb (95 kg) | 07/15/20 |
| Moussa Cissé; C | Recruit ratings: Rivals: 247Sports: ESPN: (92) | | | | |
Overall recruit ranking:
Note: In many cases, Scout, Rivals, 247Sports, On3, and ESPN may conflict in their listings of height and weight.; In these cases, the average was taken. ESPN grades are on a 100-point scale.; Sources: "Memphis 2020 Basketball Commitments". Rivals.; "2020 Memphis Tigers Recruiting Class". ESPN.; "2020 Team Ranking". Rivals.; "2020 Memphis Tigers Basketball 24/7 Sports Commits". 247Sports.

Memphis will also add Preferred Walk-on Conor Glennon a 5'10" PG from Brother Rice High School in Chicago.

=== Preseason Awards ===
- Preseason Rookie of the Year - Moussa Cisse
- All-AAC Second Team - Landers Nolley, D.J. Jeffries

== Roster ==
2020–21 Memphis Tigers men's basketball team
Players
Coaches

| Pos. | # | Name | Height | Weight | Year | Previous school | Hometown |
|---|---|---|---|---|---|---|---|
| F | 0 | D. J. Jeffries | 6 ft 7 in (2.01 m) | 225 lb (102 kg) | So | Olive Branch HS | Olive Branch, Mississippi |
| G | 1 | Jayden Hardaway | 6 ft 5 in (1.96 m) | 195 lb (88 kg) | RS So | IMG Academy | Memphis, Tennessee |
| G | 2 | Alex Lomax | 6 ft 0 in (1.83 m) | 190 lb (86 kg) | Jr | East HS | Memphis, Tennessee |
| G | 3 | Landers Nolley II | 6 ft 7 in (2.01 m) | 225 lb (102 kg) | RS So | Virginia Tech | Fairburn, Georgia |
| F | 4 | Isaiah Stokes (S) | 6 ft 8 in (2.03 m) | 250 lb (113 kg) | RS So | Florida | Memphis, Tennessee |
| G | 5 | Boogie Ellis | 6 ft 3 in (1.91 m) | 175 lb (79 kg) | So | Mission Bay HS | San Diego, California |
| G | 10 | Damion Baugh | 6 ft 3 in (1.91 m) | 185 lb (84 kg) | So | Tennessee Prep Academy | Nashville, Tennessee |
| G | 11 | Lester Quiñones | 6 ft 5 in (1.96 m) | 210 lb (95 kg) | So | IMG Academy | Brentwood, New York |
| F | 12 | DeAndre Williams | 6 ft 9 in (2.06 m) | 190 lb (86 kg) | Jr | Evansville | Houston, Texas |
| G | 14 | Jordan Nesbitt | 6 ft 6 in (1.98 m) | 185 lb (84 kg) | Fr | St. Louis Christian Academy | St. Louis, Missouri |
| F | 15 | Lance Thomas (T) | 6 ft 9 in (2.06 m) | 224 lb (102 kg) | RS Jr | Louisville | Norcross, Georgia |
| F | 20 | Ahmad Rand (T) | 6 ft 8 in (2.03 m) | 180 lb (82 kg) | Jr | USC Salkehatchie | Lincolnton, Georgia |
| C | 23 | Malcolm Dandridge | 6 ft 9 in (2.06 m) | 250 lb (113 kg) | So | East HS | Memphis, Tennessee |
| G | 30 | Conor Glennon (W) | 5 ft 10 in (1.78 m) | 165 lb (75 kg) | Fr | Brother Rice HS | Chicago, Illinois |
| C | 32 | Moussa Cissé | 6 ft 10 in (2.08 m) | 220 lb (100 kg) | Fr | Lausanne Collegiate School | Conakry, Guinea |

Head coach

- Penny Hardaway (Memphis)

Assistant coach(es)

- Tony Madlock (Memphis)
- Cody Toppert (Cornell)
- Jermaine Johnson (UT Arlington)

Legend

- (C) Team captain
- (S) Suspended
- (I) Ineligible
- (W) Walk-on
- (T) Transferred
- Injured
- Current redshirt

Roster
Last update: August 8, 2020

- Nov 19, 2020 - Prior to the start of season, Isaiah Stokes was suspended for the year.
- Dec 31, 2020 - Ahmad Rand elected to transfer to Oregon State after the fall semester.
- Jan 19, 2021 - 2021 commit Jordan Nesbitt enrolled a semester early.
- Jan 22, 2021 - Lance Thomas entered the transfer portal. He would eventually transfer to South Alabama.

== Schedule and results ==
=== COVID-19 impact ===
Due to the ongoing COVID-19 pandemic, the Tigers' schedule was subject to change, including the cancellation or postponement of individual games, the cancellation of the entire season, or games played either with minimal fans or without fans in attendance and just essential personnel. The game against Houston scheduled for March 7 was moved to Houston.

=== Schedule ===
| Date time, TV | Rank^{#} | Opponent^{#} | Result | Record | High points | High rebounds | High assists | Site (attendance) city, state |
Regular season
| November 25, 2020*; 1:00 p.m., ESPN2 | | vs. Saint Mary's; Crossover Classic quarterfinals | W 73–56 | 1–0 | 24 – Ellis | 9 – Jeffries | 3 – Lomax | Sanford Pentagon (0); Sioux Falls, SD |
| November 26, 2020*; 11:00 a.m., ESPN | | vs. Western Kentucky; Crossover Classic semifinals | L 69–75 | 1–1 | 25 – Nolley II | 10 – Jeffries | 4 – Nolley II | Sanford Pentagon (0); Sioux Falls, SD |
| November 27, 2020*; 8:00 p.m., ESPN2 | | vs. VCU; Crossover Classic third place game | L 59–70 | 1–2 | 17 – Jeffries | 5 – Jeffries | 5 – Baugh | Sanford Pentagon (0); Sioux Falls, SD |
| December 2, 2020*; 7:00 p.m., ESPN+ | | Arkansas State | W 83–54 | 2–2 | 23 – Nolley II | 10 – Tied | 6 – Tied | FedExForum (2,829); Memphis, TN |
| December 5, 2020* | | Ole Miss | Cancelled due to COVID-19 issues | | | | | The Pavilion at Ole Miss; Oxford, MS |
| December 5, 2020*; 6:00 p.m., ESPN+ | | Central Arkansas | W 85–68 | 3–2 | 23 – Nolley II | 10 – Cisse | 5 – Bauh | FedExForum (2,564); Memphis, TN |
| December 8, 2020*; 7:00 p.m., ESPN+ | | Mississippi Valley State | W 94–57 | 4–2 | 21 – Jeffries | 13 – Cisse | 11 – Lomax | FedExForum (2,478); Memphis, TN |
| December 12, 2020*; 4:30 p.m., ESPNU | | vs. Auburn; Holiday Hoopsgiving | L 71–74 | 4–3 | 16 – Jeffries | 14 – Cisse | 5 – Nolley II | State Farm Arena (0); Atlanta, GA |
| December 16, 2020; 8:00 p.m., ESPNU | | at Tulane | W 80–74 | 5–3 (1–0) | 20 – Quiñones | 11 – Jeffries | 3 – Jeffries | Devlin Fieldhouse (100); New Orleans, LA |
| December 21, 2020; 7:00 p.m., ESPN2 | | Tulsa | L 49–56 | 5–4 (1–1) | 13 – Williams | 9 – Williams | 3 – Tied | FedExForum; Memphis, TN |
| December 29, 2020; 6:00 p.m., ESPN2 | | South Florida | W 58–57 | 6–4 (2–1) | 13 – Quiñones | 4 – Cisse | 4 – Jeffries | FedExForum (133); Memphis, TN |
| January 2, 2021; 11:00 a.m., ESPNU | | at Temple | Postponed due to COVID-19 issues | | | | | Liacouras Center; Philadelphia, PA |
| January 17, 2021; 2:00 p.m., ESPN+ | | at Tulsa | L 57–58 | 6–5 (2–2) | 13 – Nolley II | 10 – Dandridge | 4 – Williams | Reynolds Center (100); Tulsa, OK |
| January 21, 2021; 6:00 p.m., ESPN2 | | Wichita State | W 72–52 | 7–5 (3–2) | 16 – Nolley II | 10 – Tied | 6 – Lomax | FedExForum (2,118); Memphis, TN |
| January 24, 2021; 3:00 p.m., ESPN2 | | at East Carolina | W 80–53 | 8–5 (4–2) | 15 – Cisse | 9 – Cisse | 5 – Lomax | Williams Arena (55); Greenville, NC |
| January 26, 2021; 6:00 p.m., ESPNU | | SMU; Previously scheduled for Jan. 14 | W 76–72 | 9–5 (5–2) | 14 – Lomax | 10 – Cisse | 5 – Lomax | FedExForum (2,157); Memphis, TN |
| January 28, 2021; 7:00 p.m., ESPN2 | | at SMU | L 65–67 | 9–6 (5–3) | 19 – Nolley II | 11 – Williams | 8 – Lomax | Moody Coliseum (1,698); University Park, TX |
| February 1, 2021; 7:00 p.m., ESPN+ | | UCF; Previously scheduled for Jan. 5 | W 96–69 | 10–6 (6–3) | 20 – Nolley II | 7 – Jeffries | 6 – Quiñones | FedExForum (2,106); Memphis, TN |
| February 3, 2021; 7:00 p.m., ESPN+ | | UCF | W 75–61 | 11–6 (7–3) | 18 – Nolley II | 10 – Nolley II | 6 – Lomax | FedExForum (2,284); Memphis, TN |
| February 6, 2021; 1:00 p.m., ESPN | | East Carolina | W 66–59 | 12–6 (8–3) | 12 – Tied | 8 – Williams | 9 – Lomax | FedExForum (2,371); Memphis, TN |
| February 11, 2021; 6:00 p.m., ESPN2 | | Cincinnati; Rivalry | Postponed due to COVID-19 issues | | | | | FedExForum; Memphis, TN |
| February 14, 2021; 1:00 p.m., ESPN | | at Houston | Postponed due to COVID-19 issues | | | | | Fertitta Center; Houston, TX |
| February 18, 2021; 6:00 p.m., ESPN/ESPN2 | | at Wichita State | Postponed due to COVID-19 issues | | | | | Charles Koch Arena; Wichita, KS |
| February 21, 2021; 2:00 p.m., ESPN+ | | Temple | Postponed due to COVID-19 issues | | | | | FedExForum; Memphis, TN |
| February 24, 2021; 7:00 p.m., ESPN+ | | Tulane | W 61–46 | 13–6 (9–3) | 13 – Ellis | 11 – Williams | 5 – Williams | FedExForum (2,253); Memphis, TN |
| February 28, 2021; 12:00 p.m., ESPN | | at Cincinnati; Rivalry | W 80–74 | 14–6 (10–3) | 17 – Ellis | 7 – Tied | 10 – Williams | Fifth Third Arena (1,135); Cincinnati, OH |
| March 2, 2021; 8:00 p.m., ESPNU | | at South Florida; Previously scheduled for Mar. 3 | W 73–52 | 15–6 (11–3) | 18 – Ellis | 10 – Williams | 4 – Jeffries | Yuengling Center (1,222); Tampa, FL |
| March 7, 2021; 11:00 a.m., CBS | | at No. 9 Houston | L 64–67 | 15–7 (11–4) | 14 – Nolley II | 5 – Tied | 4 – Tied | Fertitta Center; Houston, TX |
AAC Tournament
| March 12, 2021; 9:00 p.m., ESPNU | (3) | vs. (6) UCF; Quarterfinals | W 70–62 | 16–7 | 17 – Jeffries | 15 – Quiñones | 5 – Williams | Dickies Arena (826); Fort Worth, TX |
| March 13, 2021; 4:30 p.m., ESPN2 | (3) | vs. (2) No. 7 Houston; Semifinals | L 74–76 | 16–8 | 27 – Ellis | 7 – Cisse | 3 – Williams | Dickies Arena (1,182); Fort Worth, TX |
NIT
| March 20, 2021; 11:00 a.m., ESPN | (1) | vs. (4) Dayton; First Round – Memphis bracket | W 71–60 | 17–8 | 21 – Nolley II | 10 – Quinones | 5 – Tied | The Super Pit (1,044); Denton, TX |
| March 25, 2021; 8:00 p.m., ESPN | (1) | vs. (2) Boise State; Quarterfinals – Memphis bracket | W 59–56 | 18–8 | 11 – Tied | 7 – Quinones | 3 – Jeffries | The Super Pit (935); Denton, TX |
| March 27, 2021; 11:00 a.m., ESPN | (1) | vs. (1) Colorado State; Semifinals | W 90–67 | 19–8 | 27 – Nolley II | 9 – Williams | 6 – Tied | Comerica Center; Frisco, TX |
| March 28, 2021; 12:00 p.m., ESPN | (1) | vs. (4) Mississippi State; Championship | W 77–64 | 20–8 | 23 – Ellis | 16 – Quinones | 5 – Ellis | Comerica Center; Frisco, TX |
*Non-conference game. ^{#}Rankings from AP Poll. (#) Tournament seedings in parentheses. All times are in Central Time.

== Rankings ==
Ranking movements Legend: RV = Received votes
| | Week | | | | | | | | | | | | | | | | | | | |
| Poll | Pre | 1 | 2 | 3 | 4 | 5 | 6 | 7 | 8 | 9 | 10 | 11 | 12 | 13 | 14 | 15 | 16 | 17 | 18 | Final |
|---|---|---|---|---|---|---|---|---|---|---|---|---|---|---|---|---|---|---|---|---|
| AP | RV | | | | | | | | | | | | | | | | | | | Not released |
| Coaches | RV | | | | | | | | | | | | | | | | | | | |

*AP does not release post-NCAA Tournament rankings

== Awards and honors ==
=== American Athletic Conference honors ===
==== All-AAC Awards ====
- Freshman of the Year: Moussa Cisse
- Sixth Man of the Year : Boogie Ellis

==== All-AAC First Team ====
- Landers Nolley II

==== All-AAC Freshman Team ====
- Moussa Cisse
