= 2021–22 Oregon Ducks men's basketball team =

American college basketball season

2021–22 Oregon Ducks men's basketball

NIT, Second Round
- Conference: Pac-12 Conference
- Record: 20–15 (11–9 Pac-12)
- Head coach: Dana Altman (12th season)
- Assistant coaches: Chris Crutchfield; Kevin McKenna; Mike Mennenga
- Home arena: Matthew Knight Arena

2021–22 Pac-12 Conference men's basketball standings
	Conf.				Overall
Team	W		L	PCT	W		L	PCT
No. 2 Arizona †	18	–	2	.900	33	–	4	.892
No. 11 UCLA	15	–	5	.750	27	–	8	.771
No. 22 USC	14	–	6	.700	26	–	8	.765
Colorado	12	–	8	.600	21	–	12	.636
Oregon	11	–	9	.550	20	–	15	.571
Washington	11	–	9	.550	17	–	15	.531
Washington State	11	–	9	.550	22	–	15	.595
Arizona State	10	–	10	.500	14	–	17	.452
Stanford	8	–	12	.400	16	–	16	.500
California	5	–	15	.250	12	–	20	.375
Utah	4	–	16	.200	11	–	20	.355
Oregon State	1	–	19	.050	3	–	28	.097
† Conference tournament winner Rankings from AP poll

The 2021–22 Oregon Ducks men's basketball team represented the University of Oregon during the 2021–22 NCAA Division I men's basketball season. The Ducks, led by 12th-year head coach Dana Altman, played their home games at Matthew Knight Arena as members of the Pac–12 Conference.

== Previous season ==
The Ducks finished the season 21–7, 14–4 in Pac-12 play to win the regular season Pac-12 championship. They defeated Arizona State in the quarterfinals of the Pac-12 tournament before losing to their rival Oregon State in the semifinals. They were invited in the NCAA Tournament as a at-large bid where they moved on because VCU had COVID cases. They beat Iowa in the second round before losing to PAC-12 member USC in the Sweet Sixteen.

== Off-season ==
=== Departures ===
Note that all players in the 2020–21 season, regardless of their classification, had the option to return to the program. Due to COVID-19 impacts, the NCAA declared that the 2020–21 season would not count against the athletic eligibility of any student-athlete in any of the organization's winter sports, including basketball. This led the NBA and its players union to agree that for the 2021 draft only, players who were seniors in 2020–21 had to declare their eligibility for the draft.

Oregon departures
Name	Number	Pos.	Height	Weight	Year	Hometown	Reason for departure
Eugene Omoruyi	2	F	6'6"	235	RS senior	Rexdale, ON	Graduated and declared for the 2021 NBA draft; undrafted
Jalen Terry	3	G	6'0"	165	Freshman	Flint, MI	Transferred to DePaul
Eddy Ionescu	4	G	6'6"	190	RS senior	Walnut Creek, CA	Walk-on; graduated and chose not to return
Chris Duarte	5	G	6'6"	190	Senior	Puerto Plata, DR	Graduated and declared for the 2021 NBA draft; selected 13th overall by the Indiana Pacers
Amauri Hardy	11	G	6'2"	190	Senior	Detroit, MI	Graduated and chose not to return
L. J. Figueroa	12	G/F	6'6"	200	Senior	Lawrence, MA	Graduated and chose not to return
Chandler Lawson	13	F	6'8"	205	Sophomore	Memphis, TN	Transferred to Memphis
Aaron Estrada	24	G	6'4"	207	Sophomore	Woodbury, NJ	Transferred to Hofstra
Luke Osborn	25	G	6'6"	200	RS senior	Clackamas, OR	Walk-on; graduated and chose not to return
Will Johnson	54	G	6'1"	180	RS junior	Pacific Palisades, CA	Walk-on; graduate transferred to Humboldt State

=== Incoming transfers ===
Oregon incoming transfers
Name	Number	Pos.	Height	Weight	Year	Hometown	Previous school
De'Vion Harmon	5	G	6'2"	198	Junior	Denton, TX	Transferred from Oklahoma
Rivaldo Soares	11	G	6'6"	205	Junior	Boston, MA	Junior college transferred from South Plains College
Quincy Guerrier	13	F	6'8"	220	Junior	Montreal, QC	Transferred from Syracuse
Jacob Young	42	G	6'3"	190	Redshirt senior	Houston, TX	Transferred from Rutgers. Was eligible to play immediately since he graduated from Rutgers.

=== 2021 recruiting class ===
College recruiting
Name	Hometown	School	Height	Weight	Commit date
Nathan Bittle #2 C	Central Point, OR	Prolific Prep	6 ft 11 in (2.11 m)	205 lb (93 kg)	Sep 15, 2020
Nathan Bittle #2 C	Recruit ratings: Scout: Rivals: 247Sports: ESPN: (94)				
Isaac Johnson #16 C	American Fork, UT	American Fork High School	6 ft 10 in (2.08 m)	235 lb (107 kg)	Nov 8, 2018
Isaac Johnson #16 C	Recruit ratings: Scout: Rivals: 247Sports: ESPN: (88)				
Overall recruit ranking: Rivals: 30 247Sports: 37
Note: In many cases, Scout, Rivals, 247Sports, On3, and ESPN may conflict in their listings of height and weight.; In these cases, the average was taken. ESPN grades are on a 100-point scale.; Sources:

=== 2022 recruiting class ===
College recruiting (2022)
Name	Hometown	School	Height	Weight	Commit date
Dior Johnson #1 PG	Lakewood, CA	Centennial High School	6 ft 3 in (1.91 m)	180 lb (82 kg)	Jun 22, 2021
Dior Johnson #1 PG	Recruit ratings: Rivals: 247Sports: ESPN: (92)				
Kel'el Ware #13 C	North Little Rock, AR	North Little Rock High School	7 ft 0 in (2.13 m)	210 lb (95 kg)	Aug 9, 2021
Kel'el Ware #13 C	Recruit ratings: Rivals: 247Sports: ESPN: (90)				
Overall recruit ranking: Rivals: 18 247Sports: 14
Note: In many cases, Scout, Rivals, 247Sports, On3, and ESPN may conflict in their listings of height and weight.; In these cases, the average was taken. ESPN grades are on a 100-point scale.; Sources:

== Roster ==
2021–22 Oregon Ducks men's basketball team
Players
Coaches

Pos.	#	Name	Height	Weight	Year	Previous school	Hometown
G	0	Will Richardson	6 ft 5 in (1.96 m)	180 lb (82 kg)	Sr	Oak Hill Academy	Hinesville, Georgia
C	1	N'Faly Dante	6 ft 11 in (2.11 m)	230 lb (104 kg)	Jr	Sunrise Christian Academy	Bamako, Mali
G	5	De'Vion Harmon	6 ft 2 in (1.88 m)	198 lb (90 kg)	Jr	Oklahoma	Denton, Texas
G	10	Gabe Reichle (W)	6 ft 2 in (1.88 m)	185 lb (84 kg)	So	Wilsonville HS	Wilsonville, Oregon
G	11	Rivaldo Soares	6 ft 6 in (1.98 m)	205 lb (93 kg)	Jr	South Plains College	Boston, Massachusetts
F	13	Quincy Guerrier	6 ft 8 in (2.03 m)	220 lb (100 kg)	Jr	Syracuse	Montreal, Quebec
F	14	Ethan Butler	6 ft 6 in (1.98 m)	205 lb (93 kg)	Fr	Southwest Academy	Toronto, Ontario
F	15	Lök Wur	6 ft 9 in (2.06 m)	205 lb (93 kg)	RS So	Papillion-La Vista South HS	Omaha, Nebraska
C	22	Franck Kepnang	6 ft 11 in (2.11 m)	250 lb (113 kg)	So	Westtown School	Yaoundé, Cameroon
C	32	Nathan Bittle	7 ft 0 in (2.13 m)	215 lb (98 kg)	Fr	Prolific Prep	Central Point, Oregon
C	33	Isaac Johnson	7 ft 0 in (2.13 m)	225 lb (102 kg)	Fr	American Fork HS	American Fork, Utah
G	42	Jacob Young	6 ft 3 in (1.91 m)	190 lb (86 kg)	RS Sr	Rutgers	Houston, Texas
G	50	Eric Williams Jr.	6 ft 7 in (2.01 m)	195 lb (88 kg)	RS Sr	Duquesne	Port Huron, Michigan

Head coach

- Dana Altman (Eastern New Mexico)

Assistant coach(es)

- Chris Crutchfield (Omaha)
- Kevin McKenna (Creighton)
- Mike Mennenga (Morehead State)

Legend

- (C) Team captain
- (S) Suspended
- (I) Ineligible
- (W) Walk-on
- Injured
- Current redshirt

Roster

== Schedule and results ==
Date time, TV	Rank^{#}	Opponent^{#}	Result	Record	High points	High rebounds	High assists	Site (attendance) city, state
Regular season
November 9, 2021*; 4:00 p.m., P12N	No. 13	Texas Southern	W 83–66	1–0	20 – Richardson	12 – Guerrier	4 – Richardson	Matthew Knight Arena (7,037); Eugene, OR
November 12, 2021*; 8:00 p.m., P12N	No. 13	SMU	W 86–63	2–0	19 – Williams Jr.	7 – Soares	3 – Williams Jr.	Matthew Knight Arena (8,164); Eugene, OR
November 16, 2021*; 7:00 p.m., ESPN	No. 12	vs. BYU; Phil Knight Invitational	L 49–81	2–1	12 – Williams Jr.	4 – Tied	3 – Harmon	Moda Center (4,400); Portland, OR
November 22, 2021*; 6:00 p.m., ESPNU		vs. Chaminade; Maui Invitational Quarterfinals	W 73–49	3–1	14 – Williams Jr.	8 – Guerrier	5 – Richardson	Michelob Ultra Arena; Paradise, NV
November 23, 2021*; 5:00 p.m., ESPN		vs. Saint Mary's; Maui Invitational Semifinals	L 50–62	3–2	13 – Williams Jr.	6 – Harmon	4 – Harmon	Michelob Ultra Arena; Paradise, NV
November 24, 2021*; 1:30 p.m., ESPN2		vs. No. 12 Houston; Maui Invitational 3rd place game	L 49–78	3–3	13 – Williams Jr.	5 – Williams Jr.	3 – Williams Jr.	Michelob Ultra Arena; Paradise, NV
November 29, 2021*; 7:00 p.m., P12N		Montana	W 87–47	4–3	18 – Richardson	7 – 2 tied	4 – Williams Jr.	Matthew Knight Arena (5,739); Eugene, OR
December 1, 2021*; 7:00 p.m., P12N		UC Riverside	W 71–65	5–3	17 – Richardson	8 – Williams Jr.	5 – Richardson	Matthew Knight Arena (5,739); Eugene, OR
December 5, 2021; 4:00 p.m., P12N		Arizona State	L 67–69 ^{OT}	5–4 (0–1)	17 – Kepnang	7 – Richardson	7 – Richardson	Matthew Knight Arena (6,130); Eugene, OR
December 12, 2021; 4:00 p.m., P12N		at Stanford	L 69–72	5–5 (0–2)	18 – Guerrier	9 – Guerrier	3 – Young	Maples Pavilion (4,181); Stanford, CA
December 15, 2021*; 6:00 p.m., P12N		Portland	W 96–71	6–5	20 – Dante	9 – Dante	6 – Richardson	Matthew Knight Arena (5,251); Eugene, OR
December 18, 2021*; 7:00 p.m., ESPN2		No. 1 Baylor	L 70–78	6–6	18 – Harmon	5 – Richardson	6 – Richardson	Matthew Knight Arena (7,682); Eugene, OR
December 21, 2021*; 6:00 p.m., P12N		Pepperdine	W 68–59	7–6	19 – Richardson	9 – Guerrier	7 – Richardson	Matthew Knight Arena (5,350); Eugene, OR
January 1, 2022; 7:30 p.m., P12N		Utah	W 79–66	8–6 (1–2)	26 – Richardson	10 – Dante	4 – Young	Matthew Knight Arena (5,655); Eugene, OR
January 10, 2022; 7:00 p.m., P12N		at Oregon State; Rivalry	W 78–76	9–6 (2–2)	16 – Young	11 – 2 tied	5 – Harmon	Gill Coliseum (5,422); Corvallis, OR
January 13, 2022; 6:30 p.m., ESPN		at No. 3 UCLA	W 84–81 ^{OT}	10–6 (3–2)	23 – Young	7 – Dante	2 – Harmon	Pauley Pavilion (119); Los Angeles, CA
January 15, 2022; 8:00 p.m., FS1		at No. 5 USC	W 79–69	11–6 (4–2)	28 – Richardson	7 – Dante	4 – 2 tied	Galen Center (0); Los Angeles, CA
January 23, 2022; 7:00 p.m., FS1		Washington	W 86–54	12–6 (5–2)	21 – Richardson	4 – Guerrier	5 – Harmon	Matthew Knight Arena (6,378); Eugene, OR
January 25, 2022; 9:00 p.m., P12N		Colorado; Rescheduled from January 3	L 78–82	12–7 (5–3)	22 – Guerrier	5 – Dante	4 – Richardson	Matthew Knight Arena (6,176); Eugene, OR
January 29, 2022; 7:00 p.m., ESPN2		Oregon State; Rivalry	W 78–56	13–7 (6–3)	17 – Young	10 – Dante	4 – Young	Matthew Knight Arena (10,712); Eugene, OR
February 3, 2022; 7:00 p.m., FS1		at Colorado	W 66–51	14–7 (7–3)	21 – Young	9 – Guerrier	3 – Richardson	CU Events Center (7,611); Boulder, CO
February 5, 2022; 5:30 p.m., FS1		at Utah	W 80–77	15–7 (8–3)	25 – Richardson	10 – Williams Jr.	6 – Harmon	Jon M. Huntsman Center (7,756); Salt Lake City, UT
February 10, 2022; 6:00 p.m., ESPN2		Stanford	W 68–60	16–7 (9–3)	21 – Harmon	7 – Dante	5 – Richardson	Matthew Knight Arena (6,952); Eugene, OR
February 12, 2022; 1:00 p.m., P12N		California	L 64–78	16–8 (9–4)	22 – Richardson	9 – Richardson	4 – Young	Matthew Knight Arena (6,762); Eugene, OR
February 14, 2022; 6:00 p.m., ESPNU		Washington State; Rescheduled from January 20	W 62–59	17–8 (10–4)	13 – 2 tied	10 – Dante	5 – Richardson	Matthew Knight Arena (5,786); Eugene, OR
February 17, 2022; 6:00 p.m., ESPN		at Arizona State	L 57–81	17–9 (10–5)	12 – Richardson	6 – Tied	3 – Richardson	Desert Financial Arena (8,296); Tempe, AZ
February 19, 2022; 7:00 p.m., ESPN		at No. 3 Arizona; College GameDay	L 81–84	17–10 (10–6)	22 – Richardson	15 – Dante	5 – Young	McKale Center (14,644); Tucson, AZ
February 24, 2022; 6:30 p.m., ESPN		No. 12 UCLA	W 68–63	18–10 (11–6)	17 – Harmon	9 – Tied	6 – Young	Matthew Knight Arena (8,950); Eugene, OR
February 26, 2022; 7:00 p.m., ESPN2		No. 16 USC	L 69–70	18–11 (11–7)	15 – Guerrier	10 – Guerrier	8 – Richardson	Matthew Knight Arena (10,021); Eugene, OR
March 3, 2022; 7:00 p.m., P12N		at Washington	L 67–78	18–12 (11–8)	17 – Harmon	7 – Richardson	7 – Young	Alaska Airlines Arena (8,922); Seattle, WA
March 5, 2022; 1:00 p.m., CBS		at Washington State	L 74–94	18–13 (11–9)	21 – Young	5 – Soares	4 – Young	Beasley Coliseum; Pullman, WA
Pac-12 tournament
March 9, 2022; 2:30 p.m., P12N	(5)	vs. (12) Oregon State; First Round/Rivalry	W 86–72	19–13	23 – Young	8 – Williams Jr.	11 – Young	T-Mobile Arena; Paradise, NV
March 10, 2022; 2:30 p.m., P12N	(5)	vs. (4) Colorado; Quarterfinals	L 69–80	19–14	25 – Guerrier	13 – Guerrier	7 – Young	T-Mobile Arena; Paradise, NV
NIT
March 15, 2022; 6:00 p.m., ESPN		at (4) Utah State; First Round – Texas A&M Bracket	W 83–72	20–14	19 – Harmon	9 – Kepnang	5 – Williams Jr.	Smith Spectrum (7,023); Logan, UT
March 19, 2022; 9:00 a.m., ESPN		at (1) Texas A&M; Second Round – Texas A&M Bracket	L 60–75	20–15	13 – Tied	13 – Dante	4 – Young	Reed Arena (6,498); College Station, TX
*Non-conference game. ^{#}Rankings from AP Poll. (#) Tournament seedings in parentheses. All times are in Pacific Time.

== Awards & milestones ==
=== Season highs ===
==== Players ====
- Points:
- Rebounds:
- Assists:
- Steals:
- Blocks:
- Minutes:

==== Team ====
- Points:
- Field goals:
- Field goal attempts:
- 3 point field goals made:
- 3 point field goal attempts:
- Free throws made:
- Free throw attempts:
- Rebounds:
- Assists:
- Steals:
- Blocked shots:
- Turnovers:
- Fouls:

== Ranking movement ==
Ranking movements Legend: ██ Increase in ranking ██ Decrease in ranking — = Not ranked RV = Received votes
	Week																				
Poll	Pre	1	2	3	4	5	6	7	8	9	10	11	12	13	14	15	16	17	18	19	Final
AP	13	12	RV	—	—	—	—	—	—	—	—	—	—	—	—	—					Not released
Coaches	12	12^	23	—	—	—	—	—	—	—	—	—	—	—	—	—					

*AP does not release post-NCAA Tournament rankings. ^Coaches did not release a Week 1 poll.
