= 2021–22 Utah Utes men's basketball team =

American college basketball season

2021–22 Utah Utes men's basketball

Sunshine Slam Bracket A champions
- Conference: Pac-12 Conference
- Record: 11–20 (4–16 Pac-12)
- Head coach: Craig Smith (1st season)
- Assistant coaches: DeMarlo Slocum; Eric Peterson; Tim Morris
- Home arena: Jon M. Huntsman Center

2021–22 Pac-12 Conference men's basketball standings
	Conf.				Overall
Team	W		L	PCT	W		L	PCT
No. 2 Arizona †	18	–	2	.900	33	–	4	.892
No. 11 UCLA	15	–	5	.750	27	–	8	.771
No. 22 USC	14	–	6	.700	26	–	8	.765
Colorado	12	–	8	.600	21	–	12	.636
Oregon	11	–	9	.550	20	–	15	.571
Washington	11	–	9	.550	17	–	15	.531
Washington State	11	–	9	.550	22	–	15	.595
Arizona State	10	–	10	.500	14	–	17	.452
Stanford	8	–	12	.400	16	–	16	.500
California	5	–	15	.250	12	–	20	.375
Utah	4	–	16	.200	11	–	20	.355
Oregon State	1	–	19	.050	3	–	28	.097
† Conference tournament winner Rankings from AP poll

The 2021–22 Utah Runnin' Utes men's basketball team represented the University of Utah during the 2021–22 NCAA Division I men's basketball season. The team was led by first-year head coach Craig Smith. They played their home games at the Jon M. Huntsman Center in Salt Lake City, Utah as members of the Pac-12 Conference. The Utes finished the season 11–20, 4–16 in Pac-12 play to finish in 11th place. They lost in the first round of the Pac-12 tournament to Washington.

== Previous season ==
In a season limited due to the ongoing COVID-19 pandemic, the Utes finished the 2020–21 season 12–13, 7–11 in Pac-12 play to finish in eighth place. They defeated Washington in the first round of the Pac-12 tournament before losing to USC in the quarterfinals.

On March 16, 2021, head coach Larry Krystkowiak was fired after 10 seasons with an overall record of 183–139. The school named Craig Smith, from cross-state rival Utah State, the new head coach on March 27.

== Offseason ==
=== Departures ===
Name	Num	Pos.	Height	Weight	Year	Hometown	Reason for departure
Luc Krystkowiak	0	G	6'4"	195	RS Freshman	Salt Lake City, UT	Walk-on; left the team for personal reasons
Timmy Allen	1	F	6'6"	205	Junior	Mesa, AZ	Transferred to Texas
Ian Martinez	2	G	6'3"	183	Freshman	Heredia, CR	Transferred to Maryland
Pelle Larsson	3	G	6'5"	215	Freshman	Nacka, Sweden	Transferred to Arizona
Jordan Kellier	10	G	6'6"	215	Sophomore	Portmore, Jamaica	Transferred to Siena
Brooks King	14	G	6'3"	167	RS Junior	Boise, ID	Walk-on; left the team for personal reasons
Rylan Jones	15	G	6'0"	178	Sophomore	Salt Lake City, UT	Transferred to Utah State
Mikael Jantunen	20	F	6'8"	220	Sophomore	Helsinki, Finland	Signed to play professionally in Belgium with B.C. Oostende
Alfonso Plummer	25	G	6'1"	182	Senior	Fajardo, PR	Graduate transferred to Illinois
Brendan Wenzel	30	G	6'7"	215	RS Freshman	San Antonio, TX	Mid-season transferred to Wyoming

=== Incoming transfers ===
Name	Num	Pos.	Height	Weight	Year	Hometown	Previous school
David Jenkins Jr.	1	G	6'1"	204	RS Senior	Tacoma, WA	Transferred from UNLV. Will be eligible to play immediately since Jenkins graduated from UNLV.
Both Gach	2	G	6'6"	189	Senior	Austin, MN	Transferred from Minnesota.
Bostyn Holt	3	F	6'6"	199	Junior	Portland, OR	Junior college transferred from Coffeyville CC.
Marco Anthony	10	G	6'5"	223	RS Senior	San Antonio, TX	Transferred from Utah State. Will be eligible to play immediately since Anthony graduated from Utah State.
Dušan Mahorčić	21	F	6'10"	226	Senior	Belgrade, Serbia	Transferred from Illinois State.
Rollie Worster	25	G	6'4"	201	Sophomore	Missoula, MT	Transferred from Utah State.
Gabe Madsen	55	G	6'6"	186	Sophomore	Rochester, MN	Transferred from Cincinnati.

=== Recruiting classes ===
==== 2021 recruiting class ====
College recruiting information
Name	Hometown	School	Height	Weight	Commit date
Lazar Stefanović; SF	Belgrade, Serbia	N/A	6 ft 6 in (1.98 m)	180 lb (82 kg)	Oct 28, 2020
Lazar Stefanović; SF	Recruit ratings: Scout: Rivals: 247Sports: ESPN: (0)				
Overall recruit ranking:
Note: In many cases, Scout, Rivals, 247Sports, On3, and ESPN may conflict in their listings of height and weight.; In these cases, the average was taken. ESPN grades are on a 100-point scale.; Sources: "2021 Utah Basketball Commitment List". Rivals.; "Utah Utes 2021 Player Commits". ESPN.; "2021 Team Ranking". Rivals.

==== 2022 recruiting class ====
College recruiting information (2022)
Name	Hometown	School	Height	Weight	Commit date
Mason Falslev #62 SG	Smithfield, UT	Sky View High School	6 ft 3 in (1.91 m)	180 lb (82 kg)	Jul 28, 2018
Mason Falslev #62 SG	Recruit ratings: Scout: Rivals: 247Sports: ESPN: (75)				
Overall recruit ranking:
Note: In many cases, Scout, Rivals, 247Sports, On3, and ESPN may conflict in their listings of height and weight.; In these cases, the average was taken. ESPN grades are on a 100-point scale.; Sources: "2022 Utah Basketball Commitment List". Rivals.; "Utah Utes 2022 Player Commits". ESPN.; "2022 Team Ranking". Rivals.

== Roster ==
2021–22 Utah Utes men's basketball team
Players
Coaches

Pos.	#	Name	Height	Weight	Year	Previous school	Hometown
C	0	Lahat Thioune	6 ft 10 in (2.08 m)	228 lb (103 kg)	RS Jr	Florida Prep	Dakar, Senegal
G	1	David Jenkins Jr.	6 ft 1 in (1.85 m)	204 lb (93 kg)	RS Sr	UNLV	Tacoma, Washington
G	2	Both Gach	6 ft 6 in (1.98 m)	189 lb (86 kg)	Sr	Minnesota	Austin, Minnesota
F	3	Bostyn Holt	6 ft 6 in (1.98 m)	199 lb (90 kg)	Jr	Coffeyville CC	Portland, Oregon
G	5	Jaxon Brenchley	6 ft 5 in (1.96 m)	195 lb (88 kg)	Jr	Ridgeline HS	Providence, Utah
G	10	Marco Anthony	6 ft 5 in (1.96 m)	223 lb (101 kg)	RS Sr	Utah State	San Antonio, Texas
F	11	Riley Battin	6 ft 9 in (2.06 m)	230 lb (104 kg)	Sr	Oak Park HS	Westlake Village, California
G	13	Eli Ballstaedt (W)	6 ft 5 in (1.96 m)	197 lb (89 kg)	Jr	Wasatch HS	Midway, Utah
G	20	Lazar Stefanović	6 ft 7 in (2.01 m)	186 lb (84 kg)	Fr	Sportska gimnazija	Belgrade, Serbia
F	21	Dušan Mahorčić	6 ft 10 in (2.08 m)	226 lb (103 kg)	Sr	Illinois State	Belgrade, Serbia
G	25	Rollie Worster	6 ft 4 in (1.93 m)	201 lb (91 kg)	So	Utah State	Missoula, Montana
G	31	Jack Jamele (W)	6 ft 6 in (1.98 m)	174 lb (79 kg)	So	Middlebrooks Academy	Palos Verdes, California
G	34	Harrison Creer (W)	6 ft 4 in (1.93 m)	234 lb (106 kg)	RS Fr	Olympus HS	Holladay, Utah
C	35	Branden Carlson	7 ft 0 in (2.13 m)	216 lb (98 kg)	Jr	Bingham HS	South Jordan, Utah
G	55	Gabe Madsen	6 ft 6 in (1.98 m)	186 lb (84 kg)	So	Cincinnati	Rochester, Minnesota

Head coach

- Craig Smith (North Dakota)

Assistant coach(es)

- DeMarlo Slocum (Georgia Southern)
- Eric Peterson (UW–La Crosse)
- Tim Morris (Stanford)

Legend

- (C) Team captain
- (S) Suspended
- (I) Ineligible
- (W) Walk-on
- Injured
- Current redshirt

Roster

== Schedule and results ==
Date time, TV	Rank^{#}	Opponent^{#}	Result	Record	High points	High rebounds	High assists	Site (attendance) city, state
Exhibition
November 4, 2021; 6:00 pm		Westminster (UT)	W 87–51	–	16 – Madsen	8 – Thioune	3 – Tied	Jon M. Huntsman Center (N/A); Salt Lake City, UT
Regular season
November 9, 2021*; 6:00 pm, P12N		Abliene Christian	W 70–56	1–0	15 – Jenkins Jr.	10 – Tied	6 – Worster	Jon M. Huntsman Center (6,701); Salt Lake City, UT
November 13, 2021*; 7:30 p.m., P12N		Sacramento State	W 89–56	2–0	21 – Carlson	10 – Anthony	6 – Anthony	Jon M. Huntsman Center (6,805); Salt Lake City, UT
November 15, 2021*; 8:00 p.m., P12N		Bethune–Cookman; Sunshine Slam campus game	W 86–55	3–0	25 – Jenkins Jr.	9 – Carlson	4 – Jenkins Jr.	Jon M. Huntsman Center (6,638); Salt Lake City, UT
November 20, 2021*; 3:00 p.m., FloSports		vs. Boston College; Sunshine Slam semifinals	W 68–61	4–0	13 – Tied	7 – Anthony	7 – Worster	Ocean Center; Daytona Beach, FL
November 21, 2021*; 5:30 p.m., FloSports		vs. Tulsa; Sunshine Slam Championship	W 72–58	5–0	15 – Carlson	13 – Carlson	4 – Tied	Ocean Center (1,264); Daytona Beach, FL
November 27, 2021*; 7:30 p.m., P12N		No. 18 BYU; Rivalry	L 64–75	5–1	17 – Carlson	6 – Tied	5 – Worster	Jon M. Huntsman Center (11,443); Salt Lake City, UT
December 1, 2021; 9:30 p.m., P12N		at No. 20 USC	L 73–93	5–2 (0–1)	28 – Gach	11 – Thioune	4 – Worster	Galen Center (3,754); Los Angeles, CA
December 5, 2021; 3:00 p.m., P12N		California	W 66–58	6–2 (1–1)	19 – Gach	6 – Tied	3 – Tied	Jon M. Huntsman Center (6,548); Salt Lake City, UT
December 8, 2021*; 6:00 p.m., ESPN+		vs. TCU; Simmons Bank Showdown	L 62–76	6–3	16 – Tied	9 – Carlson	5 – Worster	Dickies Arena (2,231); Fort Worth, TX
December 11, 2021*; 3:00 p.m., P12N		Manhattan	W 96–62	7–3	16 – Thioune	7 – Tied	4 – Tied	Jon M. Huntsman Center (6,645); Salt Lake City, UT
December 18, 2021*; 2:30 p.m., SECN		at Missouri	L 75–83	7–4	18 – Jenkins Jr.	8 – Anthony	4 – Gach	Mizzou Arena (6,782); Columbia, MO
December 21, 2021*; 5:00 p.m., P12N		Fresno State	W 55–50	8–4	11 – Anthony	6 – Tied	3 – Tied	Jon M. Huntsman Center (7,673); Salt Lake City, UT
December 30, 2021; 7:00 p.m., P12N		at Oregon State	L 76–88	8–5 (1–2)	22 – Jenkins Jr.	9 – Carlson	5 – Tied	Gill Coliseum (3,245); Corvallis, OR
January 1, 2022; 8:30 p.m., P12N		at Oregon	L 66–79	8–6 (1–3)	15 – Carlson	8 – Anthony	3 – Stefanović	Matthew Knight Arena (5,655); Eugene, OR
January 6, 2022; 7:30 p.m., P12N		Washington	L 68–74	8–7 (1–4)	12 – Tied	13 – Anthony	4 – Anthony	Jon M. Huntman Center (6,964); Salt Lake City, UT
January 8, 2022; 4:00 p.m., P12N		Washington State	L 61–77	8–8 (1–5)	15 – Gach	8 – Mahorčić	3 – Gach	Jon M. Huntsman Center (7,578); Salt Lake City, UT
January 15, 2022; 6:00 p.m., P12N		at No. 6 Arizona	L 64–82	8–9 (1–6)	12 – Gach	8 – Battin	2 – Tied	McKale Center (14,164); Tucson, AZ
January 17, 2022; 2:00 p.m., P12N		at Arizona State; Rescheduled from Jan. 13	L 62–64	8–10 (1–7)	14 – Jenkins Jr.	8 – Mahorčić	3 – Worster	Desert Financial Arena (6,482); Tempe, AZ
January 20, 2022; 9:00 p.m., FS1		No. 9 UCLA	L 58–63	8–11 (1–8)	18 – Stefanović	6 – Anthony	5 – Gach	Jon M. Huntsman Center (7,785); Salt Lake City, UT
January 22, 2022; 4:30 p.m., P12N		No. 16 USC	L 67–79	8–12 (1–9)	20 – Madsen	5 – Tied	6 – Worster	Jon M. Huntsman Center (7,846); Salt Lake City, UT
January 26, 2022; 8:00 p.m., P12N		at Washington State	L 54–71	8–13 (1–10)	11 – Stefanović	6 – Worster	4 – Gach	Beasley Coliseum (3,064); Pullman, WA
January 29, 2022; 3:00 p.m., P12N		at Washington	L 73–77 ^{2OT}	8–14 (1–11)	18 – Carlson	9 – Anthony	4 – Gach	Alaska Airlines Arena (7,729); Seattle, WA
February 3, 2022; 7:00 p.m., ESPNU		Oregon State	W 84–59	9–14 (2–11)	15 – Stefanović	11 – Anthony	10 – Gach	Jon M. Huntsman Center (7,388); Salt Lake City, UT
February 5, 2022; 6:30 p.m., FS1		Oregon	L 77–80	9–15 (2–12)	19 – Madsen	12 – Anthony	6 – Worster	Jon M. Huntsman Center (7,756); Salt Lake City, UT
February 12, 2022; 6:00 p.m., P12N		at Colorado	L 76–81	9–16 (2–13)	25 – Carlson	12 – Anthony	6 – Anthony	CU Events Center (7,988); Boulder, CO
February 17, 2022; 9:00 p.m., ESPNU		at Stanford	W 60–56	10–16 (3–13)	13 – Carlson	12 – Anthony	3 – Anthony	Maples Pavilion (2,437); Stanford, CA
February 19, 2022; 4:00 p.m., P12N		at California	W 60–58	11–16 (4–13)	13 – Anthony	7 – Worster	4 – Anthony	Haas Pavilion (4,248); Berkeley, CA
February 24, 2022; 9:00 p.m., FS1		No. 2 Arizona	L 77–97	11–17 (4–14)	15 – Madsen	6 – Jenkins Jr.	3 – Tied	Jon M. Huntman Center (8,263); Salt Lake City, UT
February 26, 2022; 8:00 p.m., ESPNU		Arizona State	L 61–63	11–18 (4–15)	19 – Anthony	6 – Tied	5 – Worster	Jon M. Huntsman Center (8,940); Salt Lake City, UT
March 5, 2022; 6:00 p.m., ESPNU		Colorado	L 71–84	11–19 (4–16)	18 – Tied	5 – Tied	2 – Tied	Jon M. Huntsman Center (7,724); Salt Lake City, UT
Pac-12 tournament
March 9, 2022; 9:30 p.m., P12N	(11)	vs. (6) Washington; First round	L 70–82	11–20	18 – Anthony	8 – Worster	6 – Worster	T-Mobile Arena; Paradise, NV
*Non-conference game. ^{#}Rankings from AP Poll. (#) Tournament seedings in parentheses. All times are in Mountain Time.
