= 2021–22 Colorado Buffaloes men's basketball team =

American college basketball season

2021–22 Colorado Buffaloes men's basketball

NIT, First Round
- Conference: Pac-12 Conference
- Record: 21–12 (12–8 Pac-12)
- Head coach: Tad Boyle (12th season)
- Assistant coaches: Mike Rhon; Bill Grier; Rick Ray
- Home arena: CU Events Center

2021–22 Pac-12 Conference men's basketball standings
	Conf.				Overall
Team	W		L	PCT	W		L	PCT
No. 2 Arizona †	18	–	2	.900	33	–	4	.892
No. 11 UCLA	15	–	5	.750	27	–	8	.771
No. 22 USC	14	–	6	.700	26	–	8	.765
Colorado	12	–	8	.600	21	–	12	.636
Oregon	11	–	9	.550	20	–	15	.571
Washington	11	–	9	.550	17	–	15	.531
Washington State	11	–	9	.550	22	–	15	.595
Arizona State	10	–	10	.500	14	–	17	.452
Stanford	8	–	12	.400	16	–	16	.500
California	5	–	15	.250	12	–	20	.375
Utah	4	–	16	.200	11	–	20	.355
Oregon State	1	–	19	.050	3	–	28	.097
† Conference tournament winner Rankings from AP poll

The 2021–22 Colorado Buffaloes men's basketball team represented the University of Colorado Boulder in the 2021–22 NCAA Division I men's basketball season. They were led by head coach Tad Boyle in his twelfth season at Colorado. The Buffaloes played their home games at CU Events Center in Boulder, Colorado as members of the Pac-12 Conference. They finished the season 21–12, 12–8 in Pac-12 Play to finish in 4th place. They defeated Oregon in the quarterfinals of the Pac-12 tournament before losing in the semifinals to Arizona. They received an at-large bid to the National Invitation Tournament, where they lost in the first round to St. Bonaventure.

== Previous season ==
In a season limited due to the ongoing COVID-19 pandemic, the Buffaloes finished the 2019–20 season 23–9, 14–6 in Pac-12 play to finish in third place. They advanced to the championship game of the Pac-12 tournament where they lost to Oregon State. They received an at-large bid to the NCAA basketball tournament as the No. 5 seed in the East Region, where they defeated Georgetown in the first round before losing to Florida State in the second round.

== Offseason ==
=== Departures ===
Name	Num	Pos.	Height	Weight	Year	Hometown	Reason for departure
Maddox Daniels	3	G/F	6'6"	211	Senior	Suwanee, GA	Graduated
D'Shawn Schwartz	5	G/F	6'7"	232	Senior	Colorado Springs, CO	Graduate transferred to George Mason
Alexander Strating	10	F	6'7"	228	RS Senior	Wassenaar, Netherlands	Graduate transferred to Missouri S&T
Dallas Walton	13	F/C	7'0"	235	RS Senior	Arvada, CO	Graduate transferred to Wake Forest
Owen Koonce	15	G	6'5"	180	Freshman	Lafayette, CO	Walk-on; transferred to Colorado Mesa
McKinley Wright IV	25	G	6'0"	196	Senior	North Robbinsdale, MN	Graduated; undrafted in 2021 NBA draft
Aidan McQuade	33	G	6'2"	195	Senior	Loveland, CO	Walk-on; graduated
Isaac Jessup	40	G	6'2"	175	Freshman	Loveland, CO	Walk-on; transferred to Colorado Mesa
Jeriah Horne	41	F	6'7"	220	RS Senior	Overland Park, KS	Graduate transferred to Tulsa

=== 2021 recruiting class ===
College recruiting
Name	Hometown	School	Height	Weight	Commit date
Lawson Lovering #11 C	Laramie, WY	Central High School	7 ft 0 in (2.13 m)	200 lb (91 kg)	Oct 28, 2019
Lawson Lovering #11 C	Recruit ratings: Rivals: 247Sports: ESPN:				
Quincy Allen #16 SF	Washington, DC	Maret School	6 ft 6 in (1.98 m)	185 lb (84 kg)	Jul 17, 2020
Quincy Allen #16 SF	Recruit ratings: Rivals: 247Sports: ESPN:				
KJ Simpson #17 PG	West Hills, CA	Chaminade College Prep	6 ft 1 in (1.85 m)	175 lb (79 kg)	Apr 28, 2021
KJ Simpson #17 PG	Recruit ratings: Rivals: 247Sports: ESPN:				
Julian Hammond III #43 PG	Denver, CO	Cherry Creek High School	6 ft 2 in (1.88 m)	180 lb (82 kg)	Sep 13, 2020
Julian Hammond III #43 PG	Recruit ratings: Rivals: 247Sports: ESPN:				
Javon Ruffin #56 SG	New Orleans, LA	PHH Prep	6 ft 5 in (1.96 m)	170 lb (77 kg)	Sep 19, 2020
Javon Ruffin #56 SG	Recruit ratings: Rivals: 247Sports: ESPN:				
Overall recruit ranking:
Note: In many cases, Scout, Rivals, 247Sports, On3, and ESPN may conflict in their listings of height and weight.; In these cases, the average was taken. ESPN grades are on a 100-point scale.; Sources: "2021 Colorado Commits". Rivals.; "2021 Team Ranking". Rivals.

=== 2022 Recruiting class ===
College recruiting (2022)
Name	Hometown	School	Height	Weight	Commit date
Joe Hurlburt #19 C	Enderlin, ND	Enderlin High School	6 ft 10 in (2.08 m)	220 lb (100 kg)	Mar 29, 2021
Joe Hurlburt #19 C	Recruit ratings: Rivals: 247Sports: ESPN:				
Overall recruit ranking:
Note: In many cases, Scout, Rivals, 247Sports, On3, and ESPN may conflict in their listings of height and weight.; In these cases, the average was taken. ESPN grades are on a 100-point scale.; Sources: "2022 Colorado Commits". Rivals.; "2022 Team Ranking". Rivals.

== Roster ==
2021–22 Colorado Buffaloes men's basketball team
Players
Coaches

Pos.	#	Name	Height	Weight	Year	Previous school	Hometown
G	0	Luke O'Brien	6 ft 8 in (2.03 m)	213 lb (97 kg)	So	Columbine HS	Littleton, CO
G	1	Julian Hammond III	6 ft 3 in (1.91 m)	181 lb (82 kg)	Fr	Cherry Creek HS	Denver, CO
G	2	KJ Simpson	6 ft 2 in (1.88 m)	177 lb (80 kg)	Fr	Chaminade College Prep	West Hills, CA
G	3	Keeshawn Barthelemy	6 ft 2 in (1.88 m)	171 lb (78 kg)	RS So	Thornlea Secondary School	Montreal, QC
G/F	5	Quincy Allen	6 ft 8 in (2.03 m)	190 lb (86 kg)	Fr	Maret School	Silver Spring, MD
G	11	Javon Ruffin	6 ft 5 in (1.96 m)	191 lb (87 kg)	Fr	PHH Prep	New Orleans, LA
F	12	Jabari Walker	6 ft 9 in (2.06 m)	215 lb (98 kg)	So	AZ Compass Prep	Wichita, KS
F	21	Evan Battey	6 ft 8 in (2.03 m)	259 lb (117 kg)	RS Sr	Villa Park HS	Los Angeles, CA
F	23	Tristan da Silva	6 ft 10 in (2.08 m)	217 lb (98 kg)	So	Ludwigsgymnasium Munich	Munich, Germany
G	24	Elijah Parquet	6 ft 4 in (1.93 m)	195 lb (88 kg)	Sr	West Brook HS	Beaumont, TX
F	30	Will Loughlin (W)	6 ft 9 in (2.06 m)	245 lb (111 kg)	Jr	Seattle Prep	Seattle, WA
G	32	Nique Clifford	6 ft 6 in (1.98 m)	191 lb (87 kg)	So	The Vanguard School	Colorado Springs, CO
C	34	Lawson Lovering	7 ft 1 in (2.16 m)	225 lb (102 kg)	Fr	Central HS	Cheyenne, WY
G	40	Benan Ersek (W)	6 ft 2 in (1.88 m)	185 lb (84 kg)	Sr	Kent Denver School	Vienna, Austria
F	41	Cody Mains (W)	6 ft 8 in (2.03 m)	215 lb (98 kg)	Fr	W.T. Woodson HS	Fairfax, VA
G/F	42	Amondo Miller Jr. (W)	6 ft 6 in (1.98 m)	181 lb (82 kg)	Fr	Valor Christian HS	Littleton, CO
G	44	Jack Pease (W)	5 ft 11 in (1.8 m)	165 lb (75 kg)	Fr	Highland Park HS	Dallas, TX

Head coach

- Tad Boyle (Kansas)

Assistant coach(es)

- Mike Rohn (McPherson)
- Bill Grier (Oregon)
- Rick Ray (Grand View College)

Legend

- (C) Team captain
- (S) Suspended
- (I) Ineligible
- (W) Walk-on
- Injured
- Current redshirt

Roster

== Schedule and results ==
Date time, TV	Rank^{#}	Opponent^{#}	Result	Record	High points	High rebounds	High assists	Site (attendance) city, state
Costa Rican exhibition trip
August 13, 2021*; 8:00 p.m., FloHoops		vs. Escazu	W 79–32	0–0	13 – Simpson	10 – Clifford	4 – Parquet	BN Arena (10); San José, Costa Rica
August 14, 2021*; 8:00 p.m., FloHoops		vs. Colegio de Abogados	W 104–46	0–0	19 – Hammond	8 – Clifford	5 – Tied	BN Arena; San José, Costa Rica
August 15, 2021*; 6:00 p.m., FloHoops		vs. Costa Rica national team	W 68–54	0–0	12 – Da Silva	5 – Parquet	2 – Tied	BN Arena (10); San José, Costa Rica
August 16, 2021*; 8:00 p.m., FloHoops		vs. Grecia	W 141–31	0–0	23 – Barthelemy	7 – Tied	7 – Hammond	BN Arena (10); San José, Costa Rica
Exhibition
October 27, 2021*; 7:00 p.m.		Colorado Mines	W 78–48	0–0	12 – Simpson	9 – Lovering	3 – Barthelemy	CU Events Center (2,406); Boulder, CO
October 31, 2021*; 10:00 a.m., BTN+		at Nebraska; Charity exhibition	L 67–82	0–0	12 – Tied	8 – Tied	3 – Simpson	Pinnacle Bank Arena (15,345); Lincoln, NE
Regular season
November 9, 2021*; 8:00 p.m., P12N		Montana State	W 94–90 ^{OT}	1–0	19 – Barthelemy	9 – Clifford	5 – Barthelemy	CU Events Center (6,931); Boulder, CO
November 13, 2021*; 4:30 p.m., P12N		New Mexico	W 87–76	2–0	20 – Barthelemy	10 – Walker	3 – Tied	CU Events Center (7,115); Boulder, CO
November 15, 2021*; 6:00 p.m., P12N		Maine	W 90–46	3–0	22 – Barthelemy	7 – Tied	3 – Simpson	CU Events Center (5,633); Boulder, CO
November 19, 2021*; 6:00 p.m., ESPN3		vs. Southern Illinois; Paradise Jam quarterfinals	L 63–67	3–1	16 – Walker	7 – da Silva	4 – Parquet	UVI Sports & Fitness Center (842); St. Thomas, USVI
November 20, 2021*; 3:45 p.m., ESPN3		vs. Duquesne; Paradise Jam consolation 2nd round	W 84–76 ^{OT}	4–1	18 – Battey	13 – Walker	4 – Simpson	UVI Sports & Fitness Center (723); St. Thomas, USVI
November 22, 2021*; 1:15 p.m., ESPN3		vs. Brown; Paradise Jam 5th place game	W 54–52	5–1	16 – Battey	11 – Walker	4 – Simpson	UVI Sports & Fitness Center (655); St. Thomas, USVI
November 28, 2021; 5:00 p.m., P12N		Stanford	W 80–76	6–1 (1–0)	22 – Battey	12 – Walker	4 – da Silva	CU Events Center (6,221); Boulder, CO
December 1, 2021; 7:30 p.m., P12N		at No. 5 UCLA	L 61–73	6–2 (1–1)	22 – Walker	11 – Walker	4 – Barthelemy	Pauley Pavilion (7,941); Los Angeles, CA
December 4, 2021*; 12:00 p.m., FS1		No. 13 Tennessee	L 54–69	6–3	12 – Battey	9 – Barthelemy	4 – Barthelemy	CU Events Center (8,688); Boulder, CO
December 8, 2021*; 6:00 p.m., P12N		Eastern Washington	W 60–57	7–3	17 – Walker	10 – Walker	3 – Tied	CU Events Center (5,782); Boulder, CO
December 10, 2021*; 7:30 p.m., P12N		Milwaukee	W 65–54	8–3	15 – Battey	5 – Tied	4 – Simpson	CU Events Center (6,388); Boulder, CO
December 18, 2021*; 12:00 p.m., P12N		Cal State Bakersfield	W 60–46	9–3	12 – Barthelemy	7 – Clifford	4 – Simpson	CU Events Center (5,888); Boulder, CO
December 21, 2021*; 7:00 p.m., ESPN2		No. 7 Kansas	Canceled due to COVID-19 protocols within the Colorado program					CU Events Center; Boulder, CO
January 6, 2022; 7:00 p.m., ESPN2		Washington State	W 83–78	10–3 (2–1)	20 – Battey	8 – Walker	4 – Walker	CU Events Center (5,543); Boulder, CO
January 9, 2022; 3:00 p.m., ESPN2		Washington	W 78–64	11–3 (3–1)	22 – da Silva	13 – Walker	4 – O’Brien	CU Events Center (6,145); Boulder, CO
January 13, 2022; 9:00 p.m., FS1		at No. 6 Arizona	L 55–76	11–4 (3–2)	17 – Simpson	7 – Battey	4 – Simpson	McKale Center (13,515); Tucson, AZ
January 15, 2022; 8:00 p.m., ESPN2		at Arizona State	W 75–57	12–4 (4–2)	18 – Walker	13 – Walker	4 – Barthelemy	Desert Financial Arena (7,548); Tempe, AZ
January 20, 2022; 5:30 p.m., P12N		No. 16 USC	L 58–61	12–5 (4–3)	13 – Walker	8 – Walker	3 – Battey	CU Events Center (7,475); Boulder, CO
January 22, 2022; 7:00 p.m., P12N		No. 9 UCLA	L 65–71	12–6 (4–4)	19 – Walker	7 – Tied	5 – Tied	CU Events Center (8,774); Boulder, CO
January 25, 2022; 8:00 p.m., P12N		at Oregon; Rescheduled from Dec. 30	W 82–78	13–6 (5–4)	24 – Walker	11 – Walker	6 – Simpson	Matthew Knight Arena (6,176); Eugene, OR
January 27, 2022; 9:00 p.m., P12N		at Washington	L 58–60	13–7 (5–5)	14 – Walker	9 – Walker	4 – Barthelemy	Alaska Airlines Arena (5,593); Seattle, WA
January 30, 2022; 8:00 p.m., FS1		at Washington State	L 43–70	13–8 (5–6)	11 – Walker	8 – Walker	5 – Simpson	Beasley Coliseum (2,647); Pullman, WA
February 3, 2022; 8:00 p.m., FS1		Oregon	L 51–66	13–9 (5–7)	16 – Barthelemy	12 – Walker	3 – Simpson	CU Events Center (7,611); Boulder, CO
February 5, 2022; 4:00 p.m., FS1		Oregon State	W 86–63	14–9 (6–7)	16 – Barthelemy	11 – Walker	5 – da Silva	CU Events Center (6,918); Boulder, CO
February 12, 2022; 6:00 p.m., P12N		Utah	W 81–76	15–9 (7–7)	22 – Walker	13 – Walker	4 – Simpson	CU Events Center (7,988); Boulder, CO
February 15, 2022; 7:00 p.m., P12N		at Oregon State; Rescheduled from Jan. 1	W 90–64	16–9 (8–7)	24 – Walker	15 – Walker	4 – Barthelemy	Gill Coliseum (3,060); Corvallis, OR
February 17, 2022; 7:30 p.m., P12N		at California	W 70–62	17–9 (9–7)	19 – Simpson	15 – Walker	3 – Barthelemy	Haas Pavilion (4,396); Berkeley, CA
February 19, 2022; 8:00 p.m., ESPNU		at Stanford	W 70–53	18–9 (10–7)	15 – Battey	7 – Clifford	4 – O'Brien	Maples Pavilion (3,263); Stanford, CA
February 24, 2022; 7:00 p.m., P12N		Arizona State	L 65–82	18–10 (10–8)	13 – Battey	7 – Walker	3 – Barthelemy	CU Events Center (7,211); Boulder, CO
February 26, 2022; 6:00 p.m., ESPN2		No. 2 Arizona	W 79–63	19–10 (11–8)	19 – Da Silva	14 – Walker	2 – Simpson	CU Events Center (11,079); Boulder, CO
March 5, 2022; 7:30 p.m., ESPNU		at Utah	W 84–71	20–10 (12–8)	27 – Battey	12 – Walker	5 – Walker	Jon M. Huntsman Center (7,724); Salt Lake City, UT
Pac-12 tournament
March 10, 2022; 3:30 p.m., P12N	(4)	vs. (5) Oregon; Quarterfinals	W 80–69	21–10	19 – Battey	16 – Walker	6 – Simpson	T-Mobile Arena (11,081); Paradise, NV
March 11, 2022; 7:00 pm, P12N	(4)	vs. (1) No. 2 Arizona; Semifinals	L 72–82	21–11	19 – Walker	5 – Walker	5 – Hammond III	T-Mobile Arena; Paradise, NV
NIT tournament
March 15, 2022; 9:00 p.m., ESPN2	(4)	St. Bonaventure; First Round – Oklahoma Bracket	L 68–76	21–12	15 – Barthelemy	8 – Walker	4 – da Silva	CU Events Center (3,791); Boulder, CO
*Non-conference game. ^{#}Rankings from AP Poll. (#) Tournament seedings in parentheses. All times are in Mountain Time.

== Ranking movement ==
Ranking movements Legend: ██ Increase in ranking ██ Decrease in ranking — = Not ranked RV = Received votes
	Week																				
Poll	Pre	1	2	3	4	5	6	7	8	9	10	11	12	13	14	15	16	17	18	19	Final
AP	RV	—	—	—	—	—	—	—	—	—											Not released
Coaches	RV	—	—	—	—	—	—	—	—	—											

*AP does not release post-NCAA Tournament rankings.
