= 2021–22 Texas A&M Aggies men's basketball team =

2021–22 Texas A&M Aggies men's basketball

NIT, Runner-Up
- Conference: Southeastern Conference
- Record: 27–13 (9–9 SEC)
- Head coach: Buzz Williams (3rd season)
- Assistant coaches: Devin Johnson; Steve Roccaforte; Lyle Wolf
- Home arena: Reed Arena

2021–22 Southeastern Conference men's basketball standings
	Conf.				Overall
Team	W		L	PCT	W		L	PCT
No. 14 Auburn	15	–	3	.833	28	–	6	.824
No. 16 Kentucky	14	–	4	.778	26	–	8	.765
No. 15 Tennessee †	14	–	4	.778	27	–	8	.771
No. 8 Arkansas	13	–	5	.722	28	–	9	.757
LSU	9	–	9	.500	22	–	12	.647
Alabama	9	–	9	.500	19	–	14	.576
South Carolina	9	–	9	.500	18	–	13	.581
Texas A&M	9	–	9	.500	27	–	13	.675
Florida	9	–	9	.500	20	–	14	.588
Mississippi State	8	–	10	.444	18	–	16	.529
Vanderbilt	7	–	11	.389	19	–	17	.528
Missouri	5	–	13	.278	12	–	21	.364
Ole Miss	4	–	14	.222	13	–	19	.406
Georgia	1	–	17	.056	6	–	26	.188
† 2022 SEC tournament winner Rankings from AP poll

The 2021–22 Texas A&M Aggies men's basketball team represented Texas A&M University during the 2021–22 NCAA Division I men's basketball season. The team was led by third-year head coach Buzz Williams and played their home games at Reed Arena in College Station, Texas as a member of the Southeastern Conference. They finished the season 27–13, 9–9 in SEC play to finish in a five-way tie for fifth place. As the No. 8 seed in the SEC tournament, they defeated Florida, Auburn, and Arkansas to advance to the championship game where they lost to Tennessee. They received an at-large bid to the National Invitation Tournament as a No. 1 seed. They defeated Alcorn State, Oregon, Wake Forest, and Washington State to advance to the NIT championship game, where they lost to Xavier.

== Previous season ==
In a season limited due to the ongoing COVID-19 pandemic, the Aggies finished the 2020–21 season 8–10, 2–8 in SEC play to finish in 13th place. They lost in the first round of the SEC tournament to Vanderbillt.

== Offseason ==
=== Departures ===
Name	Number	Pos.	Height	Weight	Year	Hometown	Reason for departure
Jay Jay Chandler	0	G	6'4"	183	Senior	Katy, TX	Graduate transferred to South Alabama
Savion Flagg	1	G/F	6'7"	223	Senior	Alvin, TX	Graduate transferred to Sam Houston State
Jaxson Robinson	4	G	6'7"	193	Freshman	Ada, OK	Transferred to Arkansas
Emanuel Miller	5	F	6'7"	208	Sophomore	Scarborough, ON	Transferred to TCU
Cashius McNeilly	13	G	6'4"	191	RS Freshman	Scarborough, ON	Transferred to TCU
Jonathan Aku	15	F	6'10"	263	Sophomore	Kaduna, Nigeria	Transferred to Stephen F. Austin
LaDamien Bradford	24	G	6'4"	223	Freshman	Lincoln, NE	Transferred to Louisiana Tech
Luke McGhee	31	F	6'11"	247	Junior	San Antonio, TX	Walk-on; didn't return
Jackson Young	33	G	6'2"	193	Freshman	Kerrville, TX	Walk-on; transferred to Hawaii Pacific
Kevin Marfo	45	F	6'8"	247	GS Senior	Bergenfield, NJ	Graduate transferred to Quinnipiac

=== Incoming transfers ===
Name	Number	Pos.	Height	Weight	Year	Hometown	Previous school
Aaron Cash-Johnson	0	G	6'7"		Junior	Raleigh, NC	Grayson College
Marcus Williams	1	G	6'2'	180	Sophomore	Dickinson, TX	Wyoming
Ethan Henderson	10	F	6'8"	210	Senior	Little Rock, AR	Arkansas
Jalen Johnson	11	G/F	6'6"	210	GS Senior	Baton Rouge, LA	Mississippi State
Henry Coleman III	15	F	6'7"	229	Sophomore	Richmond, VA	Duke
Tyrece Radford	23	G	6'2"	200	RS Junior	Baton Rouge, LA	Virginia Tech

=== Recruiting classes ===
==== 2021 recruiting class ====
College recruiting information
Name	Hometown	School	Height	Weight	Commit date
Manny Obaseki #8 SG	Plano, TX	John Paul II High School	6 ft 3 in (1.91 m)	176 lb (80 kg)	Mar 11, 2020
Manny Obaseki #8 SG	Recruit ratings: Scout: Rivals: 247Sports: ESPN: (87)				
Wade Taylor IV #22 PG	Lancaster, TX	Lancaster High School	6 ft 1 in (1.85 m)	165 lb (75 kg)	Oct 16, 2020
Wade Taylor IV #22 PG	Recruit ratings: Scout: Rivals: 247Sports: ESPN: (81)				
Ashton Smith #41 PF	Houston, TX	Legacy The School of Sport Sciences	6 ft 8 in (2.03 m)	230 lb (100 kg)	Oct 31, 2020
Ashton Smith #41 PF	Recruit ratings: Scout: Rivals: 247Sports: ESPN: (77)				
Overall recruit ranking:
Note: In many cases, Scout, Rivals, 247Sports, On3, and ESPN may conflict in their listings of height and weight.; In these cases, the average was taken. ESPN grades are on a 100-point scale.; Sources: "Texas A&M 2021 Basketball Commitments". Rivals.; "2021 Team Ranking". Rivals.

==== 2022 recruiting class ====
College recruiting information (2022)
Name	Hometown	School	Height	Weight	Commit date
Amaree Abram #21 SG	Humble, TX	Southern California Academy	6 ft 3 in (1.91 m)	180 lb (82 kg)	Aug 15, 2021
Amaree Abram #21 SG	Recruit ratings: Scout: Rivals: 247Sports: ESPN: (82)				
Overall recruit ranking:
Note: In many cases, Scout, Rivals, 247Sports, On3, and ESPN may conflict in their listings of height and weight.; In these cases, the average was taken. ESPN grades are on a 100-point scale.; Sources: "Texas A&M 2022 Basketball Commitments". Rivals.; "2022 Team Ranking". Rivals.

== Roster ==
2021–22 Texas A&M Aggies men's basketball team
Players
Coaches

Pos.	#	Name	Height	Weight	Year	Previous school	Hometown
G	0	Aaron Cash	6 ft 6 in (1.98 m)	201 lb (91 kg)	Jr	Grayson College	San Francisco, California
G	1	Marcus Williams	6 ft 2 in (1.88 m)	197 lb (89 kg)	So	Wyoming	Dickinson, Texas
G	2	Hayden Hefner	6 ft 6 in (1.98 m)	182 lb (83 kg)	So	Nederland High School	Nederland, Texas
G	3	Quenton Jackson	6 ft 5 in (1.96 m)	173 lb (78 kg)	GS	College of Central Florida	Los Angeles, California
G	4	Wade Taylor IV	6 ft 0 in (1.83 m)	186 lb (84 kg)	Fr	Lancaster High School	Lancaster, Texas
G	5	Hassan Diarra	6 ft 2 in (1.88 m)	196 lb (89 kg)	So	Putnam Science Academy	Queens, New York
F	10	Ethan Henderson	6 ft 8 in (2.03 m)	193 lb (88 kg)	Sr	Arkansas	Little Rock, Arkansas
F	11	Jalen Johnson (injured) (redshirt)	6 ft 6 in (1.98 m)	210 lb (95 kg)	GS	Mississippi State	Baton Rouge, Louisiana
F	12	Everett Vaughn (W)	6 ft 10 in (2.08 m)	255 lb (116 kg)	Jr	St. Thomas High School	Bellaire, Texas
F	15	Henry Coleman III	6 ft 8 in (2.03 m)	243 lb (110 kg)	So	Duke	Richmond, Virginia
G	20	Andre Gordon	6 ft 2 in (1.88 m)	186 lb (84 kg)	Sr	Sidney High School	Sidney, Ohio
G	22	Davin Watkins (W)	6 ft 1 in (1.85 m)	185 lb (84 kg)	Fr	Nolensville High School	Nolensville, Tennessee
G	23	Tyrece Radford	6 ft 2 in (1.88 m)	200 lb (91 kg)	RS Jr	Virginia Tech	Baton Rouge, Louisiana
G	24	Zach Walker	6 ft 4 in (1.93 m)	199 lb (90 kg)	Sr	Deer Park High School	Deer Park, Texas
F	31	Javonte Brown	7 ft 0 in (2.13 m)	253 lb (115 kg)	RS Fr	UConn	Toronto, Ontario
F	32	Ashton Smith	6 ft 9 in (2.06 m)	252 lb (114 kg)	Fr	Legacy the School of Sport Sciences	Spring, Texas
G	35	Manny Obaseki	6 ft 4 in (1.93 m)	189 lb (86 kg)	Fr	John Paul II High School	Allen, Texas

Head coach

- Buzz Williams (Oklahoma City)

Assistant coach(es)

- Devin Johnson (New Orleans)
- Steve Roccaforte (Lamar)
- Lyle Wolf (Transylvania)

Legend

- (C) Team captain
- (S) Suspended
- (I) Ineligible
- (W) Walk-on
- Injured
- Current redshirt

Roster

== Schedule and results ==
Date time, TV	Rank^{#}	Opponent^{#}	Result	Record	High points	High rebounds	High assists	Site (attendance) city, state
Exhibition
November 1, 2021*; 7:00 p.m.		Texas A&M–Kingsville	W 76–72		13 – Tied	7 – Radford	4 – Williams	Reed Arena; College Station, TX
Non-conference regular season
November 10, 2021*; 7:00 p.m., SECN+		North Florida	W 64–46	1–0	27 – Coleman III	10 – Radford	5 – Williams	Reed Arena (5,129); College Station, TX
November 12, 2021*; 7:00 p.m., SECN+		Abilene Christian	W 81–80 ^{2OT}	2–0	17 – Gordon	9 – Coleman III	4 – Gordon	Reed Arena (5,206); College Station, TX
November 14, 2021*; 2:00 p.m., SECN+		Texas A&M–Corpus Christi	W 86–65	3–0	15 – Jackson	7 – Diarra	4 – Tied	Reed Arena (4,696); College Station, TX
November 17, 2021*; 12:00 p.m., SECN+		Houston Baptist	W 73–39	4–0	13 – Tied	10 – Cash	5 – Taylor IV	Reed Arena (4,409); College Station, TX
November 22, 2021*; 1:00 p.m., ESPN2		vs. Wisconsin; Maui Invitational tournament quarterfinals	L 58–69	4–1	15 – Jackson	5 – Jackson	5 – Williams	Michelob Ultra Arena (N/A); Paradise, NV
November 23, 2021*; 1:30 p.m., ESPN2		vs. Butler; Maui Invitational Tournament consolation round	W 57–50	5–1	15 – Jackson	10 – Coleman III	2 – Brown	Michelob Ultra Arena (N/A); Paradise, NV
November 25, 2021*; 10:30 p.m., ESPN2		vs. Notre Dame; Maui Invitational Tournament 5th place game	W 73–67	6–1	18 – Jackson	5 – Williams	4 – Tie	Michelob Ultra Arena (N/A); Paradise, NV
November 30, 2021*; 6:00 p.m., SECN+		New Orleans	W 85–65	7–1	15 – Gordon	8 – Cash	4 – Gordon	Reed Arena (4,958); College Station, TX
December 11, 2021*; 5:30 p.m., SECN		vs. TCU; The Battleground 2K21	L 64–68	7–2	16 – Williams	6 – Radford	3 – Williams	Toyota Center; Houston, TX
December 14, 2021*; 7:00 p.m., SECN+		Tulane; American/SEC Alliance	Canceled due to COVID-19 protocols					Reed Arena; College Station, TX
December 18, 2021*; 7:00 p.m., P12N		at Oregon State	W 83–73	8–2	19 – Taylor IV	8 – Radford	4 – Taylor IV	Gill Coliseum (3,015); Corvallis, OR
December 21, 2021*; 5:00 p.m., SECN+		Northwestern State	W 80–61	9–2	19 – Obaseki	9 – Obaseki	6 – Williams	Reed Arena (5,440); College Station, TX
December 27, 2021*; 10:00 p.m., SECN+		Dallas Christian	W 102–52	10–2	16 – Diarra	8 – Cash	6 – Taylor IV	Reed Arena (2,000); College Station, TX
December 29, 2021*; 7:00 p.m., SECN+		Central Arkansas	W 85–59	11–2	31 – Jackson	8 – Cash	8 – Williams	Reed Arena (7,674); College Station, TX
SEC regular season
January 4, 2022; 6:00 p.m., ESPNU		at Georgia	W 81–79	12–2 (1–0)	23 – Coleman III	7 – Tied	5 – Williams	Stegeman Coliseum (5,556); Athens, GA
January 8, 2022; 12:00 p.m., SECN		Arkansas	W 86–81	13–2 (2–0)	16 – Jackson	9 – Coleman III	4 – Gordon	Reed Arena (7,967); College Station, TX
January 11, 2022; 7:30 p.m., SECN		Ole Miss	W 67–51	14–2 (3–0)	18 – Coleman III	6 – Tied	8 – Williams	Reed Arena (6,053); College Station, TX
January 15, 2022; 2:30 p.m., SECN		at Missouri	W 67–64	15–2 (4–0)	18 – Coleman III	6 – Tied	6 – Williams	Mizzou Arena (7,989); Columbia, MO
January 19, 2022; 7:30 p.m., SECN		No. 12 Kentucky	L 58–64	15–3 (4–1)	17 – Coleman III	11 – Cash	4 – Tied	Reed Arena (14,036); College Station, TX
January 22, 2022; 7:30 p.m., SECN		at Arkansas	L 73–76 ^{OT}	15–4 (4–2)	25 – Taylor IV	11 – Radford	3 – Wiliams	Bud Walton Arena (19,200); Fayetteville, AR
January 26, 2022; 8:00 p.m., SECN		at No. 19 LSU	L 64–70	15–5 (4–3)	20 – Jackson	7 – Coleman III	3 – Williams	Pete Maravich Assembly Center (10,929); Baton Rouge, LA
January 29, 2022; 7:30 p.m., SECN		South Carolina	L 63–74	15–6 (4–4)	14 – Gordon	15 – Coleman III	3 – Taylor IV	Reed Arena (9,079); College Station, TX
February 1, 2022; 6:00 p.m., SECN		at No. 22 Tennessee	L 80–90	15–7 (4–5)	19 – Taylor IV	7 – Radford	3 – Tied	Thompson–Boling Arena (16,607); Knoxville, TN
February 5, 2022; 3:00 p.m., ESPN2		Missouri	L 66–70	15–8 (4–6)	17 – Tied	6 – Jackson	5 – Williams	Reed Arena (8,013); College Station, TX
February 8, 2022; 6:00 p.m., SECN		LSU	L 68–76	15–9 (4–7)	15 – Radford	12 – Coleman III	5 – Jackson	Reed Arena (6,636); College Station, TX
February 12, 2022; 11:00 a.m., ESPN		at No. 1 Auburn; College GameDay	L 58–75	15–10 (4–8)	11 – Jackson	13 – Coleman III	3 – Taylor IV	Auburn Arena (9,121); Auburn, AL
February 15, 2022; 6:00 p.m., SECN		Florida	W 56–55	16–10 (5–8)	16 – Jackson	8 – Radford	3 – Taylor IV	Reed Arena (6,349); College Station, TX
February 19, 2022; 5:00 p.m., SECN		at Vanderbilt	L 67–72	16–11 (5–9)	23 – Jackson	6 – Jackson	3 – Williams	Memorial Gymnasium (6,702); Nashville, TN
February 22, 2022; 6:00 p.m., ESPNU		Georgia	W 91–77	17–11 (6–9)	31 – Jackson	4 – Tied	5 – Diarra	Reed Arena (5,587); College Station, TX
February 26, 2022; 2:30 p.m., SECN		at Ole Miss	W 76–66	18–11 (7–9)	19 – Radford	7 – Radford	3 – Radford	SJB Pavilion (6,654); Oxford, MS
March 2, 2022; 6:00 p.m., SECN		at No. 25 Alabama	W 87–71	19–11 (8–9)	28 – Jackson	11 – Coleman III	3 – Jackson	Coleman Coliseum (9,281); Tuscaloosa, AL
March 5, 2022; 7:30 p.m., SECN		Mississippi State	W 67–64	20–11 (9–9)	18 – Jackson	9 – Radford	3 – Gordon	Reed Arena (9,955); College Station, TX
SEC tournament
March 10, 2022; 11:00 a.m., SECN	(8)	vs. (9) Florida; Second Round	W 83–80 ^{OT}	21–11	22 – Coleman III	8 – Coleman III	4 – Radford	Amalie Arena (10,295); Tampa, FL
March 11, 2022; 11:00 a.m., ESPN	(8)	vs. (1) No. 4 Auburn; Quarterfinals	W 67–62	22–11	19 – Radford	10 – Coleman III	3 – Coleman III	Amalie Arena (16,094); Tampa, FL
March 12, 2022; 12:00 p.m., ESPN	(8)	vs. (4) No. 15 Arkansas; Semifinals	W 82–64	23–11	20 – Jackson	5 – Tied	6 – Jackson	Amalie Arena; Tampa, FL
March 13, 2022; 12:00 p.m., ESPN	(8)	vs. (2) No. 9 Tennessee; Championship	L 50–65	23–12	13 – Radford	7 – Coleman III	3 – Jackson	Amalie Arena (16,643); Tampa, FL
NIT
March 15, 2022*; 8:00 p.m., ESPN2	(1)	Alcorn State; First Round – Texas A&M Bracket	W 74–62	24–12	14 – Radford	14 – Radford	3 – Tied	Reed Arena (6,379); College Station, TX
March 19, 2022*; 11:00 a.m., ESPN	(1)	Oregon; Second Round – Texas A&M Bracket	W 75–60	25–12	17 – Jackson	11 – Radford	3 – Radford	Reed Arena (6,498); College Station, TX
March 23, 2022*; 6:00 p.m., ESPN2	(1)	(2) Wake Forest; Quarterfinals – Texas A&M Bracket	W 67–52	26–12	12 – 2 tied	8 – Radford	3 – Taylor IV	Reed Arena (8,201); College Station, TX
March 29, 2022*; 8:30 p.m., ESPN2	(1)	vs. (4) Washington State; Semifinals	W 72–56	27–12	18 – Jackson	7 – Radford	6 – Jackson	Madison Square Garden (8,506); New York City, NY
March 31, 2022*; 6:00 p.m., ESPN	(1)	vs. (2) Xavier; Championship	L 72–73	27–13	23 – Jackson	9 – Coleman III	3 – Diarra	Madison Square Garden; New York City, NY
*Non-conference game. ^{#}Rankings from AP Poll. (#) Tournament seedings in parentheses. All times are in Central Time.

== See also ==
- 2021–22 Texas A&M Aggies women's basketball team
