= 2021–22 Washington State Cougars men's basketball team =

American college basketball season

2021–22 Washington State Cougars men's basketball

NIT, Semifinals
- Conference: Pac-12 Conference
- Record: 22–15 (11–9 Pac-12)
- Head coach: Kyle Smith (3rd season)
- Assistant coaches: Derrick Phelps; Jim Shaw; John Andrejek
- Home arena: Beasley Coliseum

2021–22 Pac-12 Conference men's basketball standings
	Conf.				Overall
Team	W		L	PCT	W		L	PCT
No. 2 Arizona †	18	–	2	.900	33	–	4	.892
No. 11 UCLA	15	–	5	.750	27	–	8	.771
No. 22 USC	14	–	6	.700	26	–	8	.765
Colorado	12	–	8	.600	21	–	12	.636
Oregon	11	–	9	.550	20	–	15	.571
Washington	11	–	9	.550	17	–	15	.531
Washington State	11	–	9	.550	22	–	15	.595
Arizona State	10	–	10	.500	14	–	17	.452
Stanford	8	–	12	.400	16	–	16	.500
California	5	–	15	.250	12	–	20	.375
Utah	4	–	16	.200	11	–	20	.355
Oregon State	1	–	19	.050	3	–	28	.097
† Conference tournament winner Rankings from AP poll

The 2021–22 Washington State Cougars men's basketball team represented Washington State University during the 2021–22 NCAA Division I men's basketball season. The team was led by third-year head coach Kyle Smith. The Cougars played their home games at the Beasley Coliseum in Pullman, Washington as members of the Pac-12 Conference.

== Previous season ==
The Cougars finished the 2019–20 season 14–13, 7–12 in Pac-12 play to finish in 10th place. They lost in the first round to Arizona State of the Pac-12 tournament.

== Offseason ==
=== Departures ===
Name	Number	Pos.	Height	Weight	Year	Hometown	Reason for departure
Myles Fitzgerald-Warren	2	G	6'3"	185	RS junior	Portland, OR	Transferred to Westmont College
Aljaz Kunc	4	F	6'8"	212	Junior	Ljubljana, Slovenia	Graduate transferred to Iowa State
Isaac Bonton	10	G	6'3"	190	Senior	Portland, OR	Graduated
Volodymyr Markovetskyy	15	C	7'1"	270	Sophomore	Truskavets, Ukraine	Transferred
Brandon Chatfield	33	F	6'10"	210	RS freshman	Clarkston, WA	Walk-on; transferred to Seattle

=== Incoming transfers ===
Name	Num	Pos.	Height	Weight	Year	Hometown	Previous school
Tyrell Roberts	2	G	5'11"	175	RS junior	Sacramento, CA	UC San Diego
Michael Flowers	12	G	6'1"	190	Graduate student	Southfield, MI	South Alabama
Matt DeWolf	14	F	6'9"	235	Graduate student	Barrington, RI	Brown
Will Burghardt	33	G	5'11'	185	Graduate student	Longview, WA	Linfield

=== 2021 recruiting class ===
College recruiting
Name	Hometown	School	Height	Weight	Commit date
Mouhamed Gueye #22 PF	Windsor, CA	Prolific Prep	6 ft 10 in (2.08 m)	190 lb (86 kg)	May 7, 2021
Mouhamed Gueye #22 PF	Recruit ratings: Scout: Rivals: 247Sports: ESPN:				
Myles Rice #45 PG	Columbia, SC	Sandy Creek High School	6 ft 10 in (2.08 m)	190 lb (86 kg)	Nov 7, 2020
Myles Rice #45 PG	Recruit ratings: Scout: Rivals: 247Sports: ESPN:				
Overall recruit ranking:
Note: In many cases, Scout, Rivals, 247Sports, On3, and ESPN may conflict in their listings of height and weight.; In these cases, the average was taken. ESPN grades are on a 100-point scale.; Sources: "2021 Washington State Commits". Rivals.; "Men's Basketball Recruiting". Scout.; "ESPN- Washington State Cougars Men's Basketball Recruiting". ESPN.; "Scout.com Team Recruiting Rankings". Scout.; "2021 Team Ranking". Rivals.

== Roster ==
2021–22 Washington State Cougars men's basketball team
Players
Coaches

Pos.	#	Name	Height	Weight	Year	Previous school	Hometown
C	0	Efe Abogidi	6 ft 10 in (2.08 m)	225 lb (102 kg)	So	NBA Global Academy	Delta State, Nigeria
G	2	Tyrell Roberts	5 ft 11 in (1.8 m)	175 lb (79 kg)	RS Jr	UC San Diego	Sacramento, CA
G	3	Jefferson Koulibaly	6 ft 3 in (1.91 m)	185 lb (84 kg)	RS Fr	Lincoln Prep	Montreal, QC
G	4	Myles Rice	6 ft 2 in (1.88 m)	175 lb (79 kg)	Fr	Sandy Creek HS	Columbia, SC
G	5	TJ Bamba	6 ft 5 in (1.96 m)	215 lb (98 kg)	So	Abraham Lincoln HS	The Bronx, NY
F	11	Dennis Rodman Jr.	6 ft 6 in (1.98 m)	215 lb (98 kg)	Jr	JSerra Catholic HS	Newport Beach, CA
G	12	Michael Flowers	6 ft 1 in (1.85 m)	190 lb (86 kg)	GS	South Alabama	Southfield, MI
F	13	Carlos Rosario	6 ft 7 in (2.01 m)	180 lb (82 kg)	So	Veritas Prep	Santo Domingo, DR
F	14	Matt DeWolf	6 ft 9 in (2.06 m)	235 lb (107 kg)	GS	Brown	Barrington, RI
C	21	Dishon Jackson	6 ft 10 in (2.08 m)	250 lb (113 kg)	So	St. Patrick-St. Vincent HS	Oakland, CA
G	22	Ryan Rapp	6 ft 5 in (1.96 m)	189 lb (86 kg)	Jr	Mazenod College	Melbourne, Australia
F	23	Andrej Jakimovski	6 ft 8 in (2.03 m)	215 lb (98 kg)	So	Reale Mutua Torino	Skopje, Macedonia
G	24	Noah Williams	6 ft 5 in (1.96 m)	195 lb (88 kg)	Jr	O'Dea HS	Seattle, WA
F	32	Tony Miller	6 ft 6 in (1.98 m)	215 lb (98 kg)	GS	Montana	Woodinville, WA
G	33	Will Burghardt (W)	5 ft 11 in (1.8 m)	185 lb (84 kg)	GS	Linfield	Longview, WA
F	35	Mouhamed Gueye	6 ft 11 in (2.11 m)	210 lb (95 kg)	Fr	Prolific Prep	Dakar, Senegal

Head coach

- Kyle Smith (Hamilton)

Assistant coach(es)

- Derrick Phelps (North Carolina)
- Jim Shaw (Western Oregon)
- John Andrejek (Columbia)

Legend

- (C) Team captain
- (S) Suspended
- (I) Ineligible
- (W) Walk-on
- Injured
- Current redshirt

Roster

== Schedule and results ==
Date time, TV	Rank^{#}	Opponent^{#}	Result	Record	High points	High rebounds	High assists	Site (attendance) city, state
Regular season
November 9, 2021*; 12:00 p.m., P12N		Alcorn State; Washington State Multi-Team Event	W 85–67	1–0	16 – Roberts	11 – Flowers	6 – Flowers	Beasley Coliseum (1,023); Pullman, WA
November 12, 2021*; 7:00 p.m., P12N		Seattle; Washington State Multi-Team Event	W 79–61	2–0	17 – Roberts	9 – Jackson	2 – Williams	Beasley Coliseum (3,878); Pullman, WA
November 15, 2021*; 8:00 p.m., P12N		UC Santa Barbara	W 73–65	3–0	18 – Abogidi	9 – Gueye	5 – Flowers	Beasley Coliseum (2,928); Pullman, WA
November 18, 2021*; 6:00 p.m., ESPN+		at Idaho; Battle of the Palouse	W 109–61	4–0	16 – Williams	6 – Gueye	5 – Williams	ICCU Arena (2,727); Moscow, ID
November 22, 2021*; 6:00 p.m., P12N		Winthrop	W 92–86	5–0	20 – Flowers	8 – Jackson	3 – Williams	Beasley Coliseum (2,370); Pullman, WA
November 27, 2021*; 4:30 p.m., P12N		Eastern Washington	L 71–76	5–1	23 – Roberts	9 – Flowers	2 – Gueye	Beasley Coliseum (2,720); Pullman, WA
December 1, 2021; 4:30 p.m., P12N		at Arizona State	W 51–29	6–1 (1–0)	14 – Williams	10 – Jackson	2 – Roberts	Desert Financial Arena (6,793); Tempe, AZ
December 4, 2021; 3:00 p.m., P12N		No. 20 USC	L 61–63	6–2 (1–1)	13 – Flowers	7 – Jackson	2 – Williams	Beasley Coliseum (4,069); Pullman, WA
December 8, 2021*; 7:00 p.m., P12N		Weber State	W 94–60	7–2	17 – Williams	10 – Gueye	5 – Tied	Beasley Coliseum (2,900); Pullman, WA
December 11, 2021*; 12:00 p.m., P12N		vs. South Dakota State; Washington State in Spokane	L 74–77	7–3	24 – Flowers	6 – Gueye	5 – Flowers	Spokane Arena (1,686); Spokane, WA
December 15, 2021*; 7:00 p.m., P12N		New Mexico State	L 61–64	7–4	15 – Flowers	7 – Abogidi	3 – Flowers	Beasley Coliseum (2,702); Pullman, WA
December 18, 2021*; 1:00 p.m., P12N		Northern Colorado	W 82–56	8–4	21 – Rodman	10 – Rodman	4 – Flowers	Beasley Coliseum (2,438); Pullman, WA
December 22, 2021*; 5:00 p.m., P12N		vs. Boise State; Washington State in Spokane	L 52–58	8–5	16 – Roberts	12 – Jakimovski	3 – Jakimovski	Spokane Arena (4,018); Spokane, WA
January 6, 2022; 6:00 p.m., ESPN2		at Colorado	L 78–83	8–6 (1–2)	25 – Roberts	10 – Abogidi	5 – Flowers	CU Events Center (5,543); Boulder, CO
January 8, 2022; 3:00 p.m., P12N		at Utah	W 77–61	9–6 (2–2)	17 – Roberts	7 – Jakimovski	6 – Flowers	Jon M. Huntsman Center (7,578); Salt Lake City, UT
January 13, 2022; 8:00 p.m., ESPNU		Stanford	L 57–62	9–7 (2–3)	16 – Gueye	11 – Gueye	4 – Roberts	Beasley Coliseum (2,612); Pullman, WA
January 15, 2022; 1:00 p.m., P12N		California	W 65–57	10–7 (3–3)	16 – Jakimovski	8 – Gueye	5 – Roberts	Beasley Coliseum (3,051); Pullman, WA
January 26, 2022; 7:00 p.m., P12N		Utah	W 71–54	11–7 (4–3)	15 – Tied	8 – Jakimovski	3 – Flowers	Beasley Coliseum (3,064); Pullman, WA
January 30, 2022; 7:00 p.m., FS1		Colorado	W 70–43	12–7 (5–3)	16 – Flowers	11 – Abogidi	5 – Flowers	Beasley Coliseum (2,647); Pullman, WA
February 3, 2022; 6:00 p.m., P12N		at Stanford	W 66–60	13–7 (6–3)	22 – Flowers	9 – Gueye	5 – Flowers	Maples Pavilion (2,172); Stanford, CA
February 5, 2022; 1:00 p.m., P12N		at California	W 68–64	14–7 (7–3)	21 – Flowers	11 – Abogidi	2 – Tied	Haas Pavilion (4,361); Berkeley, CA
February 10, 2022; 6:00 p.m., FS1		No. 4 Arizona	L 60–72	14–8 (7–4)	16 – Flowers	6 – Abogidi	3 – Flowers	Beasley Coliseum (5,012); Pullman, WA
February 12, 2022; 8:00 p.m., ESPNU		Arizona State	L 55–58	14–9 (7–5)	14 – Roberts	11 – Gueye	3 – Bamba	Beasley Coliseum (3,394); Pullman, WA
February 14, 2022; 6:00 p.m., ESPNU		at Oregon; Rescheduled from Jan. 20	L 59–62	14–10 (7–6)	23 – Flowers	7 – Bamba	3 – Flowers	Matthew Knight Arena (5,786); Eugene, OR
February 17, 2022; 8:00 p.m., FS1		at No. 13 UCLA	L 56–76	14–11 (7–7)	14 – Roberts	6 – Jakimovski	3 – Williams	Pauley Pavilion (7,916); Los Angeles, CA
February 20, 2022; 4:30 p.m., FS1		at No. 17 USC	L 60–62	14–12 (7–8)	16 – Roberts	11 – Jakimovski	4 – Roberts	Galen Center (4,268); Los Angeles, CA
February 23, 2022; 8:00 p.m., ESPNU		Washington; Rivalry/Rescheduled from Dec. 29	W 78–70	15–12 (8–8)	25 – Gueye	14 – Abogidi	7 – Flowers	Beasley Coliseum (4,510); Pullman, WA
February 26, 2022; 3:00 p.m., P12N		at Washington; Rivalry	L 70–78	15–13 (8–9)	30 – Flowers	7 – Gueye	4 – Flowers	Alaska Airlines Arena (7,269); Seattle, WA
February 28, 2022; 8:00 p.m., ESPNU		at Oregon State; Rescheduled from Jan. 22	W 103–97 ^{OT}	16–13 (9–9)	27 – Flowers	6 – Jackson	6 – Flowers	Gill Coliseum (3,888); Corvallis, OR
March 1, 2022; 8:00 p.m., FS1		Oregon State	W 71–67	17–13 (10–9)	16 – Bamba	8 – Tied	4 – Tied	Beasley Coliseum (3,099); Pullman, WA
March 5, 2022; 1:00 p.m., CBS		Oregon	W 94–74	18–13 (11–9)	19 – Williams	8 – Jakimovski	6 – Flowers	Beasley Coliseum (4,169); Pullman, WA
Pac-12 Tournament
March 9, 2022; 6:00 pm, P12N	(7)	vs. (10) California; First Round	W 66–59	19–13	19 – Abogidi	10 – Jakimovski	2 – Tied	T-Mobile Arena; Paradise, NV
March 10, 2022; 6:00 pm, P12N	(7)	vs. (2) No. 13 UCLA; Quarterfinals	L 65–75	19–14	15 – Jakimovski	8 – Abogidi	3 – Tied	T-Mobile Arena; Paradise, NV
NIT
March 15, 2022*; 8:00 pm, ESPNU	(4)	Santa Clara; First Round – SMU Bracket	W 63–50	20–14	23 – Roberts	8 – Jackson	5 – Flowers	Beasley Coliseum (1,389); Pullman, WA
March 20, 2022*; 12:00 pm, ESPN+	(4)	at (1) SMU; Second Round – SMU Bracket	W 75–63	21–14	22 – Flowers	9 – Jackson	3 – Tied	Moody Coliseum (2,179); University Park, TX
March 23, 2022*; 6:00 pm, ESPN2	(4)	at (2) BYU; Quarterfinals – SMU Bracket	W 77–58	22–14	27 – Flowers	8 – Rodman	5 – Flowers	Marriott Center (11,148); Provo, UT
March 29, 2022*; 6:30 pm, ESPN2	(4)	vs. (1) Texas A&M; Semifinals	L 56–72	22–15	14 – Roberts	10 – Abogidi	3 – Roberts	Madison Square Garden (8,506); New York, NY
*Non-conference game. ^{#}Rankings from AP Poll. (#) Tournament seedings in parentheses. All times are in Pacific Time.
