= 2021–22 Oregon State Beavers men's basketball team =

American college basketball season

2021–22 Oregon State Beavers men's basketball
- Conference: Pac-12 Conference
- Record: 3–28 (1–19 Pac-12)
- Head coach: Wayne Tinkle (8th season)
- Associate head coach: Kerry Rupp (8th season)
- Assistant coaches: Stephen Thompson (8th season); Marlon Stewart (3rd season)
- Home arena: Gill Coliseum

2021–22 Pac-12 Conference men's basketball standings
	Conf.				Overall
Team	W		L	PCT	W		L	PCT
No. 2 Arizona †	18	–	2	.900	33	–	4	.892
No. 11 UCLA	15	–	5	.750	27	–	8	.771
No. 22 USC	14	–	6	.700	26	–	8	.765
Colorado	12	–	8	.600	21	–	12	.636
Oregon	11	–	9	.550	20	–	15	.571
Washington	11	–	9	.550	17	–	15	.531
Washington State	11	–	9	.550	22	–	15	.595
Arizona State	10	–	10	.500	14	–	17	.452
Stanford	8	–	12	.400	16	–	16	.500
California	5	–	15	.250	12	–	20	.375
Utah	4	–	16	.200	11	–	20	.355
Oregon State	1	–	19	.050	3	–	28	.097
† Conference tournament winner Rankings from AP poll

The 2021–22 Oregon State Beavers men's basketball team represented Oregon State University in the 2021–22 NCAA Division I men's basketball season. The Beavers were led by eighth-year head coach Wayne Tinkle, and played their home games at Gill Coliseum in Corvallis, Oregon as members of the Pac-12 Conference. They finished the season 3–28, 1–19 in Pac-12 play to finish in last place. They lost to Oregon in the first round of the Pac-12 tournament.

== Previous season ==
In a season limited due to the ongoing COVID-19 pandemic, the Beavers finished the 2020–21 season 20–13, 10–10 in Pac-12 play to finish in sixth place.

Despite being picked to finish last in the Pac-12 standings in preseason media polls, the Beavers finished tied for sixth in conference play and received a 5-seed in the Pac-12 tournament due to Arizona's self-imposed ban. Despite the Beavers' outperforming of low expectations, the consensus among analysts entering the Pac-12 tournament was that OSU would not receive an at-large bid to the upcoming NCAA tournament, and thus needed to win the conference tournament to make the field as an automatic qualifier. The Beavers proceeded to defeat 4-seed UCLA in overtime, top-seed and rival Oregon, and 3-seed Colorado in succession to win their first Pac-12 tournament title in school history and guarantee just their second NCAA tournament berth since 1990.

Seeded 12th in the Midwest region in the 2021 NCAA tournament, the Beavers trailed for less than five combined minutes in upset wins over 5th-seeded Tennessee and 4th-seeded Oklahoma State to advance to the Sweet Sixteen. The wins were Oregon State's first in the NCAA tournament since advancing to the Elite Eight in 1982. The Beavers next overcame a slow start to defeat 8-seed Loyola-Chicago and advance to the Elite Eight, matching their 1982 run. Over their six-game postseason winning streak dating back to the Pac-12 tournament, the Beavers were not favored in a single game. They became just the second ever 12-seed to advance to the Elite Eight since the tournament expanded to 64 teams in 1985.

Facing the 2-seed Houston Cougars in the Midwest regional final, the Beavers rallied from a 17-point second half deficit to tie the game with under four minutes remaining. Houston prevailed, 67–61, to end Oregon State's Cinderella run.

== Off-season ==
=== Departures ===
Name	Num	Pos.	Height	Weight	Year	Hometown	Reason for departure
Ethan Thompson	5	G	6'5"	195	Senior	Los Angeles, CA	Graduated
Zach Reichle	11	G	6'5"	205	Senior	Wilsonville, OR	Graduated
Julien Franklin	22	G	6'7"	200	RS freshman	Brea, CA	Transferred to Cal Poly
Joey Potts	23	F	6'10"	200	RS junior	Petaluma, CA	Transferred to Oregon Tech
DeAron Tucker	35	F	6'10"	240	Sophomore	Dallas, TX	Transferred to Indiana State
Tariq Silver	55	G	6'5"	200	RS junior	Clarksville, TN	Transferred to Austin Peay

=== Incoming transfers ===
Name	Num	Pos.	Height	Weight	Year	Hometown	Previous school
Dexter Akanno	3	G	6'5"	210	RS sophomore	Valencia, CA	Marquette
Tre' Williams	4	G	6'6"	200	Junior	Dallas, TX	Minnesota
Xzavier Malone-Key	5	G	6'4"	200	RS senior	Philadelphia, PA	Fairleigh Dickinson
Chol Marial	11	C	7'2"	235	Junior	Rumbeck, South Sudan	Maryland
Dashawn Davis	13	G	6'2"	185	Junior	Bronx, NY	Trinity Valley CC
Ahmad Rand	44	F	6'8"	200	RS junior	Lincolnton, GA	Memphis

=== 2021 recruiting class ===
College recruiting
Name	Hometown	School	Height	Weight	Commit date
Glenn Taylor Jr. #47 SF	Las Vegas, NV	AZ Compass Prep	6 ft 6 in (1.98 m)	190 lb (86 kg)	May 3, 2021
Glenn Taylor Jr. #47 SF	Recruit ratings: Scout: Rivals: 247Sports: ESPN: (76)				
Overall recruit ranking:
Note: In many cases, Scout, Rivals, 247Sports, On3, and ESPN may conflict in their listings of height and weight.; In these cases, the average was taken. ESPN grades are on a 100-point scale.; Sources: "2021 Basketball Player Commits". ESPN.; "2021 Team Ranking". Rivals.

=== 2022 recruiting class ===
College recruiting (2022)
Name	Hometown	School	Height	Weight	Commit date
Cruz Davis #36 SG	Lewisville, TX	iSchool of Lewisville	6 ft 2 in (1.88 m)	160 lb (73 kg)	Feb 1, 2021
Cruz Davis #36 SG	Recruit ratings: Scout: Rivals: 247Sports: ESPN: (81)				
Overall recruit ranking:
Note: In many cases, Scout, Rivals, 247Sports, On3, and ESPN may conflict in their listings of height and weight.; In these cases, the average was taken. ESPN grades are on a 100-point scale.; Sources: "2022 Basketball Player Commits". ESPN.; "2022 Team Ranking". Rivals.

== Roster ==
2021–22 Oregon State Beavers men's basketball team
Players
Coaches

Pos.	#	Name	Height	Weight	Year	Previous school	Hometown
G	0	Gianni Hunt	6 ft 4 in (1.93 m)	190 lb (86 kg)	Jr	Bishop Montgomery HS	Lakewood, California
F	1	Maurice Calloo	6 ft 10 in (2.08 m)	220 lb (100 kg)	Sr	Indian Hills CC	Windsor, Ontario
G	2	Jarod Lucas	6 ft 4 in (1.93 m)	195 lb (88 kg)	Jr	Los Altos HS	Hacienda Heights, California
G	3	Dexter Akanno	6 ft 5 in (1.96 m)	210 lb (95 kg)	RS So	Marquette	Valencia, California
G	4	Tre' Williams	6 ft 6 in (1.98 m)	200 lb (91 kg)	Jr	Minnesota	Dallas, Texas
G	5	Xzavier Malone-Key	6 ft 4 in (1.93 m)	200 lb (91 kg)	RS Sr	Fairleigh Dickinson	Philadelphia, Pennsylvania
F	10	Warith Alatishe	6 ft 8 in (2.03 m)	210 lb (95 kg)	Sr	Nicholls	Houston, Texas
C	11	Chol Marial	7 ft 2 in (2.18 m)	235 lb (107 kg)	Jr	Maryland	Rumbek, South Sudan
C	12	Roman Silva	7 ft 1 in (2.16 m)	265 lb (120 kg)	RS Sr	San Bernardino Valley College	Rancho Cucamonga, California
G	13	Dashawn Davis	6 ft 2 in (1.88 m)	185 lb (84 kg)	Jr	Trinity Valley CC	Bronx, New York
G	14	Dyshawn Hobson (W)	6 ft 2 in (1.88 m)	190 lb (86 kg)	Jr	Corvallis HS	Corvallis, Oregon
G	23	Jack Cherry (W)	6 ft 5 in (1.96 m)	185 lb (84 kg)	Fr	Galena HS	Reno, Nevada
F	24	Isaiah Johnson	6 ft 6 in (1.98 m)	215 lb (98 kg)	So	Bishop Montgomery HS	Torrance, California
F	34	Rodrigue Andela	6 ft 8 in (2.03 m)	250 lb (113 kg)	Sr	Kilgore College	Yaoundé, Cameroon
F	35	Glenn Taylor Jr.	6 ft 6 in (1.98 m)	200 lb (91 kg)	Fr	AZ Compass Prep	Las Vegas, Nevada
F	44	Ahmad Rand	6 ft 8 in (2.03 m)	200 lb (91 kg)	RS Jr	Memphis	Lincolnton, Georgia

Head coach

- Wayne Tinkle (Montana)

Assistant coach(es)

- Kerry Rupp (Southern Utah)
- Stephen Thompson (Syracuse)
- Marlon Stewart (North Dakota)

Legend

- (C) Team captain
- (S) Suspended
- (I) Ineligible
- (W) Walk-on
- Injured
- Current redshirt

Roster

== Schedule and results ==
Date time, TV	Rank^{#}	Opponent^{#}	Result	Record	High points	High rebounds	High assists	Site (attendance) city, state
Exhibition
Nov. 4, 2021; 7:00 p.m., P12N		Saint Martin's	W 83–80	–	–	–	–	Gill Coliseum; Corvallis, OR
Regular season
November 9, 2021*; 7:00 p.m., P12N		Portland State	W 73–64	1–0	21 – Alatishe	8 – Tied	4 – Davis	Gill Coliseum (4,448); Corvallis, OR
November 12, 2021*; 5:00 p.m., ESPN+		at Iowa State	L 50–60	1–1	8 – Tied	9 – Alatishe	4 – Tied	Hilton Coliseum (12,401); Ames, IA
November 15, 2021*; 6:00 p.m., ESPNU		at Tulsa	L 58–64	1–2	20 – Calloo	8 – Andela	6 – Hunt	Donald W. Reynolds Center (2,759); Tulsa, OK
November 18, 2021*; 6:00 p.m., P12N		Samford; Emerald Coast Classic campus-site game	L 77–78	1–3	20 – Alatishe	6 – Tied	9 – Davis	Gill Coliseum (3,491); Corvallis, OR
November 21, 2021*; 12:00 p.m., P12N		Princeton	L 80–81	1–4	16 – Davis	10 – Alatishe	5 – Davis	Gill Coliseum (3,368); Corvallis, OR
November 26, 2021*; 6:30 pm, CBSSN		vs. Wake Forest; Emerald Coast Classic semifinals	L 77–80 ^{OT}	1–5	16 – Andela	5 – Tied	5 – Williams	The Arena at NFSC (2,146); Niceville, FL
November 27, 2021*; 1:00 pm		vs. Penn State; Emerald Coast Classic	L 45–60	1–6	11 – Lucas	8 – Alatishe	1 – Tied	The Arena at NFSC (1,350); Niceville, FL
December 2, 2021; 7:30 p.m., P12N		at California	L 61–73	1–7 (0–1)	21 – Alatishe	8 – Alatishe	4 – Davis	Haas Pavilion (4,505); Berkeley, CA
December 5, 2021; 1:00 p.m., ESPNU		No. 11 Arizona	L 65–90	1–8 (0–2)	17 – Lucas	9 – Alatishe	8 – Davis	Gill Coliseum (3,918); Corvallis, OR
December 14, 2021*; 7:00 p.m., P12N		UC Davis	L 64–71	1–9	14 – Lucas	10 – Rand	6 – Davis	Gill Coliseum (2,954); Corvallis, OR
December 18, 2021*; 5:00 p.m., P12N		Texas A&M	L 73–83	1–10	25 – Lucas	5 – Rand	7 – Davis	Gill Coliseum (3,015); Corvallis, OR
December 21, 2021*; 8:00 p.m., P12N		Nicholls	W 83–61	2–10	24 – Lucas	7 – Tied	6 – Davis	Gill Coliseum (2,873); Corvallis, OR
December 30, 2021; 6:00 p.m., P12N		Utah	W 88–76	3–10 (1–2)	25 – Lucas	6 – Tied	8 – Davis	Gill Coliseum (3,245); Corvallis, OR
January 3, 2022*; 3:00 p.m.		Sacramento State	Canceled due to COVID-19 protocols.					Gill Coliseum; Corvallis, OR
January 10, 2022; 7:30 p.m., P12N		Oregon; Rivalry	L 76–78	3–11 (1–3)	16 – Alatishe	9 – Silva	5 – Davis	Gill Coliseum (5,422); Corvallis, OR
January 13, 2022; 8:00 p.m., ESPNU		at No. 5 USC	L 71–81	3–12 (1–4)	27 – Lucas	8 – Alatishe	7 – Davis	Galen Center (0); Los Angeles, CA
January 15, 2022; 7:30 p.m., P12N		at No. 3 UCLA	L 65–81	3–13 (1–5)	12 – Tied	4 – Tied	5 – Davis	Pauley Pavilion (141); Los Angeles, CA
January 20, 2022; 8:30 p.m., P12N		Washington	L 72–82	3–14 (1–6)	17 – Davis	10 – Alatishe	8 – Davis	Gill Coliseum (3,833); Corvallis, OR
January 29, 2022; 7:00 p.m., ESPN2		at Oregon; Rivalry	L 56–78	3–15 (1–7)	17 – Silva	6 – Tied	4 – Davis	Matthew Knight Arena (10,712); Eugene, OR
February 3, 2022; 6:00 p.m., ESPNU		at Utah	L 59–84	3–16 (1–8)	12 – Silva	8 – Silva	5 – Davis	Jon M. Huntsman Center (7,388); Salt Lake City, UT
February 5, 2022; 3:00 p.m., FS1		at Colorado; Rescheduled from Jan. 1	L 63–86	3–17 (1–9)	15 – Taylor Jr.	7 – Silva	1 – Tied	CU Events Center (6,918); Boulder, CO
February 9, 2022; 8:00 p.m., ESPNU		California	L 61–63	3–18 (1–10)	18 – Calloo	7 – Alatishe	3 – Lucas	Gill Coliseum (3,180); Corvallis, OR
February 12, 2022; 7:30 p.m., P12N		Stanford	L 65–76	3–19 (1–11)	17 – Lucas	6 – Rand	9 – Davis	Gill Coliseum (3,684); Corvallis, OR
February 15, 2022; 6:00 p.m, P12N		Colorado	L 64–90	3–20 (1–12)	22 – Davis	5 – Calloo	6 – Davis	Gill Coliseum (3,060); Corvallis, OR
February 17, 2022; 4:30 p.m., P12N		at No. 3 Arizona	L 69–83	3–21 (1–13)	13 – Silva	8 – Calloo	7 – Davis	McKale Center (12,905); Tucson, AZ
February 19, 2022; 5:00 p.m., ESPN2		at Arizona State	L 53–73	3–22 (1–14)	14 – Taylor Jr.	10 – Taylor Jr.	2 – Tied	Desert Financial Arena (7,234); Tempe, AZ
February 24, 2022; 8:00 p.m., ESPN2		No. 16 USC	L 91–94 ^{2 OT}	3–23 (1–15)	31 – Davis	7 – Silva	7 – Davis	Gill Coliseum (3,685); Corvallis, OR
February 26, 2022; 1:00 p.m., CBS		No. 12 UCLA	L 55–94	3–24 (1–16)	13 – Calloo	7 – Silva	3 – Taylor Jr.	Gill Coliseum (4,584); Corvallis, OR
February 28, 2022; 8:00 p.m., ESPNU		Washington State; Rescheduled from Jan. 22	L 97–103 ^{OT}	3–25 (1–17)	21 – Silva	7 – Silva	11 – Davis	Gill Coliseum (3,888); Corvallis, OR
March 3, 2022; 8:00 p.m., FS1		at Washington State	L 67–71	3–26 (1–18)	20 – Calloo	9 – Silva	5 – Taylor Jr.	Beasley Coliseum (3,099); Pullman, WA
March 5, 2022; 4:30 p.m., P12N		at Washington	L 67–78	3–27 (1–19)	17 – Davis	5 – Silva	6 – Davis	Alaska Airlines Arena (8,884); Seattle, WA
Pac-12 tournament
March 9, 2022; 12:00 p.m., P12N	(12)	vs. (5) Oregon; First round/Rivalry	L 67–78	3–28	22 – Lucas	5 – Calloo	5 – Davis	T-Mobile Arena (7,565); Paradise, NV
*Non-conference game. ^{#}Rankings from AP Poll. (#) Tournament seedings in parentheses. All times are in Pacific Time.
