= Jarod Lucas =

American basketball player (born 1999)

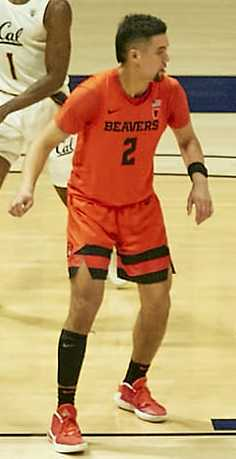
- Lucas with Oregon State in 2021

Personal information
- Born: December 7, 1999 (age 26) Whittier, California, U.S.
- Listed height: 6 ft 4 in (1.93 m)
- Listed weight: 195 lb (88 kg)

Career information
- High school: Los Altos (Hacienda Heights, California)
- College: Oregon State (2019–2022); Nevada (2022–2024)
- NBA draft: 2024: undrafted
- Position: Point guard / shooting guard

Career history
- 2024-2025: Texas Legends
- 2025: Bàsquet Girona

Career highlights
- Mountain West Newcomer of the Year (2023); 2× Second-team All-Mountain West (2023, 2024)
- Stats at NBA.com
- Stats at Basketball Reference

Jarod Lucas (born December 7, 1999) is a former American basketball player and now an assistant coach for the Nevada Wolf Pack men’s basketball program. He played college basketball for the Nevada Wolf Pack and Oregon State Beavers.

== High school career ==
Lucas played basketball for Los Altos High School in Hacienda Heights, California, where he was coached by his father. As a senior, he averaged 39.4 points, 11.3 rebounds and 4.4 assists per game. He scored 3,356 points during his high school career, the most in CIF Southern Section history. Lucas competed for the Compton Magic on the Amateur Athletic Union circuit. He committed to playing college basketball for Oregon State over offers from Ole Miss, Nevada, Tulsa and Santa Clara.

== College career ==
As a freshman at Oregon State, Lucas averaged 4.6 points per game. On February 27, 2021, he scored a career-high 26 points in a 73–62 win over Stanford. Lucas helped Oregon State win its first Pac-12 tournament and was named to the All-Tournament Team. He averaged 12.7 points, 2.3 rebounds, and 1.2 assists per game and led Oregon State to the Elite Eight of the NCAA Tournament.

Following the 2021–22 season, Lucas entered the NCAA transfer portal. He transferred to Nevada.

== Professional career ==
After going undrafted in the 2024 NBA draft, Lucas signed with the Dallas Mavericks on October 18, 2024. However, he was waived the next day and on October 26, he joined the Texas Legends.

Lucas was announced as a new Bàsquet Girona player on March 30, 2025. He signed with the Liga ACB team until the end of the season.

== Career statistics ==
Legend
GP	Games played	GS	Games started	MPG	Minutes per game
FG%	Field goal percentage	3P%	3-point field goal percentage	FT%	Free throw percentage
RPG	Rebounds per game	APG	Assists per game	SPG	Steals per game
BPG	Blocks per game	PPG	Points per game	**Bold**	Career high

*	Led NCAA Division I

=== College ===
Year	Team	GP	GS	MPG	FG%	3P%	FT%	RPG	APG	SPG	BPG	PPG
2019–20	Oregon State	31	0	13.1	.351	.342	.870	.9	.4	.3	.0	4.6
2020–21	Oregon State	**33***	23	29.3	.380	**.389**	**.896**	2.3	**1.2**	.7	.0	12.7
2021–22	Oregon State	31	31	33.7	**.415**	.386	.871	**2.4**	1.2	**.8**	.0	13.5
2022–23	Nevada	**33**	**33**	**34.4**	.413	.378	.863	**2.4**	**1.4**	.4	.0	**17.0**
Career		128	87	27.8	.399	.379	.874	2.0	1.0	.5	.0	12.0

== Personal life ==
Lucas' father, Jeff, played college basketball at Hawaii and serves as head coach for Los Altos High School. He went to Grazide Elementary School and Mesa Robles Middle School. His mother Christina played volleyball in high school. His younger brother, Jordan, is a standout volleyball player at Los Altos and has represented the United States at the youth level. Lucas is of Filipino descent from his mother side.
