= 2021–22 Washington Huskies men's basketball team =

American college basketball season

2021–22 Washington Huskies men's basketball
- Conference: Pac-12 Conference
- Record: 17–15 (11–9 Pac-12)
- Head coach: Mike Hopkins (5th season)
- Assistant coaches: Will Conroy (7th season); Wyking Jones (1st season); Quincy Pondexter (1st season)
- Home arena: Alaska Airlines Arena

2021–22 Pac-12 Conference men's basketball standings
	Conf.				Overall
Team	W		L	PCT	W		L	PCT
No. 2 Arizona †	18	–	2	.900	33	–	4	.892
No. 11 UCLA	15	–	5	.750	27	–	8	.771
No. 22 USC	14	–	6	.700	26	–	8	.765
Colorado	12	–	8	.600	21	–	12	.636
Oregon	11	–	9	.550	20	–	15	.571
Washington	11	–	9	.550	17	–	15	.531
Washington State	11	–	9	.550	22	–	15	.595
Arizona State	10	–	10	.500	14	–	17	.452
Stanford	8	–	12	.400	16	–	16	.500
California	5	–	15	.250	12	–	20	.375
Utah	4	–	16	.200	11	–	20	.355
Oregon State	1	–	19	.050	3	–	28	.097
† Conference tournament winner Rankings from AP poll

The 2021–22 Washington Huskies men's basketball team represented the University of Washington in the 2021–22 NCAA Division I men's basketball season. The Huskies, led by fifth-year head coach Mike Hopkins, played their home games at Alaska Airlines Arena at Hec Edmundson Pavilion in Seattle, Washington as members of the Pac-12 Conference.

== Previous season ==
The Huskies finished the 2020–21 season 5–21, 4–16 in Pac-12 play to finish in twelfth place. The Huskies as the 12th seed lost to Utah in a first round game of the Pac-12 tournament. Assistant coaches Cameron Dollar and Dave Rice left the program after the season ended.

== Offseason ==
=== Departures ===
Washington departures
Name	Number	Pos.	Height	Weight	Year	Hometown	Reason for departure
Erik Stevenson	10	G	6'3"	198	Senior	Lacey, WA	Transferred to South Carolina
Marcus Tsohonis	0	G	6'3"	190	Junior	Portland, OR	Transferred to VCU
Nate Pryor	4	G	6'4"	175	Junior	Seattle, WA	Transferred to New Mexico State
RaeQuan Battle	21	G	6'5"	175	Senior	Marysville, WA	Transferred to Montana State
J’Raan Brooks	33	F	6'9"	220	Junior	Seattle, WA	Transferred to UC San Diego
Hameir Wright	13	F	6'9"	220	Senior	Albany, NY	Transferred to North Texas
Quade Green	55	G	6'0"	170	Senior	Philadelphia, PA	Graduated
Travis Rice	30	G	6'2"	185	Senior	Las Vegas, NV	Walk-on; graduated

=== Incoming transfers ===
Washington incoming transfers
Name	Number	Pos.	Height	Weight	Year	Hometown	Previous school	Years remaining	Date eligible
Emmitt Matthews Jr.	0	F	6'7"	215	Senior	Tacoma, WA	West Virginia	2	October 1, 2021
PJ Fuller	4	G	6'4"	175	Junior	Seattle, WA	TCU	3	October 1, 2021
Daejon Davis	11	G	6'3"	190	Graduate student	Seattle, WA	Stanford	1	October 1, 2021
Langston Wilson	13	F	6'9"	200	Junior	Philadelphia, PA	Georgia Highlands	3	October 1, 2021
Terrell Brown Jr.	23	G	6'3"	185	Graduate student	Seattle, WA	Arizona	1	October 1, 2021

=== 2021 recruiting class ===
College recruiting
Name	Hometown	School	Height	Weight	Commit date
Jackson Grant; F	Olympia, WA	Olympia High School	6 ft 10 in (2.08 m)	205 lb (93 kg)	Nov 9, 2019
Jackson Grant; F	Recruit ratings: Rivals: 247Sports: ESPN: (86)				
Dominiq Penn; G	Dublin, OH	Sunrise Christian Academy (KS)	6 ft 0 in (1.83 m)	175 lb (79 kg)	Jan 5, 2021
Dominiq Penn; G	Recruit ratings: Rivals: 247Sports: ESPN: (79)				
Samuel Ariyibi; F	Lagos, Nigeria	NBA Africa Academy	6 ft 8 in (2.03 m)	190 lb (86 kg)	Mar 25, 2021
Samuel Ariyibi; F	Recruit ratings: (NR)				
Overall recruit ranking: Rivals: 38 247Sports: 46
Note: In many cases, Scout, Rivals, 247Sports, On3, and ESPN may conflict in their listings of height and weight.; In these cases, the average was taken. ESPN grades are on a 100-point scale.; Sources: "2021 Washington Commits". Rivals.; "ESPN- Washington Huskies Men's Basketball Recruiting". ESPN.; "2021 Team Ranking". Rivals.

== Roster ==
2021–22 Washington Huskies men's basketball team
Players
Coaches

Pos.	#	Name	Height	Weight	Year	Previous school	Hometown
F	0	Emmitt Matthews Jr.	6 ft 7 in (2.01 m)	215 lb (98 kg)	Sr	West Virginia	Tacoma, WA
F	1	Nate Roberts	6 ft 11 in (2.11 m)	265 lb (120 kg)	RS Jr	Brewster Academy (NH)	Washington, D.C.
G	4	PJ Fuller	6 ft 4 in (1.93 m)	175 lb (79 kg)	Jr	TCU	Seattle, WA
G	5	Jamal Bey	6 ft 6 in (1.98 m)	210 lb (95 kg)	Sr	Bishop Gorman	Las Vegas, NV
G	10	Dominiq Penn	6 ft 2 in (1.88 m)	170 lb (77 kg)	So	Sunrise Christian Academy (KS)	Columbus, OH
G	11	Daejon Davis	6 ft 3 in (1.91 m)	190 lb (86 kg)	GS	Stanford	Seattle, WA
F	12	Jackson Grant	6 ft 10 in (2.08 m)	205 lb (93 kg)	Fr	Olympia	Olympia, WA
F	13	Langston Wilson	6 ft 9 in (2.06 m)	200 lb (91 kg)	Jr	Georgia Highlands College (GA)	Upper Darby, PA
G	14	Kyle Luttinen	6 ft 7 in (2.01 m)	185 lb (84 kg)	So	Roosevelt	Seattle, WA
G	15	Griff Hopkins (W)	6 ft 4 in (1.93 m)	185 lb (84 kg)	So	Bellevue (WA)	Syracuse, NY
F	21	Samuel Ariyibi	6 ft 8 in (2.03 m)	190 lb (86 kg)	Fr	NBA Africa Academy	Lagos, Nigeria
G	22	Cole Bajema	6 ft 7 in (2.01 m)	190 lb (86 kg)	Jr	Michigan	Lynden, WA
G	23	Terrell Brown Jr.	6 ft 3 in (1.91 m)	185 lb (84 kg)	GS	Arizona	Seattle, WA
G	24	Jonah Geron (W)	6 ft 6 in (1.98 m)	195 lb (88 kg)	RS Jr	San Joaquin Memorial	Fresno, CA
G	30	Anthony Iglesia (W)	5 ft 7 in (1.7 m)	150 lb (68 kg)	Jr	Skagit Valley College	Syracuse, NY
G	32	Noah Neubauer (W)	6 ft 4 in (1.93 m)	190 lb (86 kg)	RS Jr	Garfield	Seattle, WA
F	34	Regan Lundeen (W)	6 ft 6 in (1.98 m)	230 lb (104 kg)	Sr	Mater Dei	Santa Ana, CA
C	52	Riley Sorn	7 ft 5 in (2.26 m)	255 lb (116 kg)	RS Jr	Richland	Richland, WA

Head coach

- Mike Hopkins (Syracuse)

Assistant coach(es)

- Will Conroy (Washington)
- Wyking Jones (Loyola Marymount)
- Quincy Pondexter (Washington)

Legend

- (C) Team captain
- (S) Suspended
- (I) Ineligible
- (W) Walk-on
- Injured
- Current redshirt

Roster
Last update: November 2, 2021

== Schedule and results ==
Date time, TV	Rank^{#}	Opponent^{#}	Result	Record	High points	High rebounds	High assists	Site (attendance) city, state
Exhibition
November 4, 2021*; 7:00 p.m.		Central Washington	W 83–50	–	17 – Brown	12 – Roberts	4 – Bey	Alaska Airlines Arena (5,864); Seattle, WA
Regular season
November 9, 2021*; 7:00 p.m., P12N		Northern Illinois	L 64–71	0–1	22 – Brown	19 – Roberts	3 – Brown	Alaska Airlines Arena (6,356); Seattle, WA
November 11, 2021*; 7:30 p.m., P12N		Northern Arizona	W 73–62	1–1	21 – Matthews	9 – Matthews	2 – Davis	Alaska Airlines Arena (6,297); Seattle, WA
November 15, 2021*; 6:00 p.m., P12N		Texas Southern	W 72–65	2–1	20 – Brown	7 – Tied	9 – Brown	Alaska Airlines Arena (5,315); Seattle, WA
November 18, 2021*; 8:00 p.m., P12N		Wyoming	L 72–77 ^{OT}	2–2	30 – Brown	12 – Wilson	3 – Brown	Alaska Airlines Arena (5,670); Seattle, WA
November 22, 2021*; 6:30 p.m., ESPN+		vs. George Mason; Crossover Classic	W 77–74	3–2	23 – Brown	8 – Brown	4 – Tied	Sanford Pentagon (1,822); Sioux Falls, SD
November 23, 2021*; 6:30 p.m., ESPN+		vs. South Dakota State; Crossover Classic	W 87–76	4–2	32 – Brown	8 – Roberts	5 – Davis	Sanford Pentagon (1,600); Sioux Falls, SD
November 24, 2021*; 4:00 p.m., ESPN+		vs. Nevada; Crossover Classic	L 62–81	4–3	19 – Brown	5 – Tied	4 – Brown	Sanford Pentagon (1,239); Sioux Falls, SD
November 27, 2021*; 7:00 p.m., P12N		Winthrop	L 74–82	4–4	21 – Davis	6 – Matthews	6 – Brown	Alaska Airlines Arena (5,703); Seattle, WA
December 12, 2021*; 2:00 p.m., ESPN		at No. 5 Gonzaga; Rivalry	Canceled due to COVID-19 protocols from Washington					McCarthey Athletic Center; Spokane, WA
December 18, 2021*; 7:00 p.m., P12N		Seattle	W 64–56	5–4	17 – Matthews	11 – Matthews	5 – Davis	Alaska Airlines Arena (6,084); Seattle, WA
December 21, 2021*; 6:00 p.m., P12N		Utah Valley	L 52–68	5–5	23 – Brown	6 – Tied	2 – Brown	Alaska Airlines Arena (5,618); Seattle, WA
January 3, 2022; 5:00 p.m., P12N		at No. 8 Arizona; Rescheduled from Dec. 2	L 79–95	5–6 (0–1)	28 – Brown	8 – Brown	6 – Brown	McKale Center (12,496); Tucson, AZ
January 6, 2022; 6:30 p.m., P12N		at Utah	W 74–68	6–6 (1–1)	16 – Davis	5 – Davis	8 – Brown	Jon M. Huntsman Center (6,964); Salt Lake City, UT
January 9, 2022; 2:00 p.m., ESPN2		at Colorado	L 64–78	6–7 (1–2)	18 – Bajema	5 – Matthews	5 – Brown	CU Events Center (6,145); Boulder, CO
January 12, 2022; 7:00 p.m., P12N		California	W 64–55	7–7 (2–2)	21 – Brown	12 – Roberts	7 – Davis	Alaska Airlines Arena (5,448); Seattle, WA
January 15, 2022; 3:00 p.m., P12N		Stanford	W 67–64	8–7 (3–2)	25 – Brown	8 – Roberts	4 – Tied	Alaska Airlines Arena (6,627); Seattle, WA
January 20, 2022; 8:30 p.m., P12N		at Oregon State	W 82–72	9–7 (4–2)	27 – Brown	6 – Brown	7 – Davis	Gill Coliseum (3,833); Corvallis, OR
January 23, 2022; 7:00 p.m., FS1		at Oregon	L 56–84	9–8 (4–3)	14 – Brown	8 – Roberts	2 – Tied	Matthew Knight Arena (6,378); Eugene, OR
January 27, 2022; 8:00 p.m., P12N		Colorado	W 60–58	10–8 (5–3)	26 – Brown	11 – Matthews	4 – Tied	Alaska Airlines Arena (5,593); Seattle, WA
January 29, 2022; 2:00 p.m., P12N		Utah	W 77–73 ^{2OT}	11–8 (6–3)	30 – Brown	10 – Matthews	4 – Brown	Alaska Airlines Arena (7,729); Seattle, WA
February 3, 2022; 8:00 p.m., P12N		at California	W 84–63	12–8 (7–3)	20 – Bey	8 – Roberts	8 – Brown	Haas Pavilion (4,038); Berkeley, CA
February 6, 2022; 1:00 p.m., ESPNU		at Stanford	L 69–87	12–9 (7–4)	30 – Brown	7 – Tied	6 – Brown	Maples Pavilion (2,655); Stanford, CA
February 10, 2022; 8:00 p.m., FS1		Arizona State	W 87–64	13–9 (8–4)	19 – Brown	7 – Tied	8 – Brown	Alaska Airlines Arena (5,154); Seattle, WA
February 12, 2022; 3:00 p.m., P12N		No. 4 Arizona	L 68–92	13–10 (8–5)	29 – Brown	9 – Roberts	2 – Brown	Alaska Airlines Arena (8,503); Seattle, WA
February 17, 2022; 8:30 p.m., P12N		at No. 17 USC	L 69–79	13–11 (8–6)	23 – Brown	10 – Roberts	6 – Brown	Galen Center (3,218); Los Angeles, CA
February 19, 2022; 7:00 p.m., FS1		at No. 13 UCLA	L 50–76	13–12 (8–7)	13 – Brown	11 – Bey	3 – Brown	Pauley Pavilion (10,586); Los Angeles, CA
February 23, 2022; 8:00 p.m., ESPNU		at Washington State; Rivalry/Rescheduled from Dec. 29	L 70–78	13–13 (8–8)	23 – Fuller	6 – Bajema	8 – Brown	Beasley Coliseum (4,510); Pullman, WA
February 26, 2022; 3:00 p.m., P12N		Washington State; Rivalry	W 78–70	14–13 (9–8)	25 – Brown	8 – Matthews	5 – Davis	Alaska Airlines Arena (7,269); Seattle, WA
February 28, 2022; 8:00 p.m., ESPN2		No. 17 UCLA; Rescheduled from Dec. 5	L 66–77	14–14 (9–9)	20 – Brown	9 – Roberts	2 – Brown	Alaska Airlines Arena (6,248); Seattle, WA
March 3, 2022; 7:00 p.m., P12N		Oregon	W 78–67	15–14 (10–9)	25 – Tied	16 – Roberts	4 – Brown	Alaska Airlines Arena (8,922); Seattle, WA
March 5, 2022; 4:30 p.m., P12N		Oregon State	W 78–67	16–14 (11–9)	24 – Brown	16 – Roberts	5 – Davis	Alaska Airlines Arena (8,884); Seattle, WA
PAC-12 Tournament
March 9, 2022; 8:30 p.m., P12N	(6)	vs. (11) Utah; First round	W 82–70	17–14	22 – Brown	11 – Roberts	5 – Brown	T-Mobile Arena (8,579); Paradise, NV
March 10, 2022; 8:30 p.m., FS1	(6)	vs. (3) No. 21 USC; Quarterfinals	L 61–65	17–15	23 – Brown	6 – Tied	5 – Brown	T-Mobile Arena (10,417); Paradise, NV
*Non-conference game. ^{#}Rankings from AP Poll. (#) Tournament seedings in parentheses. All times are in Pacific Time.

== Rankings ==
Ranking movements Legend: — = Not ranked
	Week																				
Poll	Pre	1	2	3	4	5	6	7	8	9	10	11	12	13	14	15	16	17	18	19	Final
AP	—	—	—	—	—	—	—	—	—												Not released
Coaches	—	—	—	—	—	—	—	—													
