= 2021–22 USC Trojans men's basketball team =

American college basketball season

2021–22 USC Trojans men's basketball

Wooden Legacy champions

NCAA tournament, First Round
- Conference: Pac-12 Conference

Ranking
- AP: No. 22
- Record: 26–8 (14–6 Pac-12)
- Head coach: Andy Enfield (9th season)
- Assistant coaches: Chris Capko (6th season); Eric Mobley (4th season); Jay Morris (1st season)
- Home arena: Galen Center (Capacity: 10,258)

2021–22 Pac-12 Conference men's basketball standings
	Conf.				Overall
Team	W		L	PCT	W		L	PCT
No. 2 Arizona †	18	–	2	.900	33	–	4	.892
No. 11 UCLA	15	–	5	.750	27	–	8	.771
No. 22 USC	14	–	6	.700	26	–	8	.765
Colorado	12	–	8	.600	21	–	12	.636
Oregon	11	–	9	.550	20	–	15	.571
Washington	11	–	9	.550	17	–	15	.531
Washington State	11	–	9	.550	22	–	15	.595
Arizona State	10	–	10	.500	14	–	17	.452
Stanford	8	–	12	.400	16	–	16	.500
California	5	–	15	.250	12	–	20	.375
Utah	4	–	16	.200	11	–	20	.355
Oregon State	1	–	19	.050	3	–	28	.097
† Conference tournament winner Rankings from AP poll

The 2021–22 USC Trojans men's basketball team represented the University of Southern California during the 2021–22 NCAA Division I men's basketball season. The Trojans are led by 9th-year head coach Andy Enfield and played their home games at the Galen Center for the 16th season in Los Angeles as members of the Pac-12 Conference. They finished the season 26–8, 14–6 in Pac-12 Play to finish in third place. As the No. 3 seed in the Pac-12 tournament, they defeated Washington in the quarterfinals before losing in the semifinals to UCLA. They received an at-large bid to the NCAA tournament as the No. 7 seed in the Midwest Region, where they lost in the First Round to Miami (FL).

== Previous season ==
The USC Trojans finished the 2020–21 season with a 25–8 overall record, and a 15–5 conference record. They finished in second place in the Pac-12 Conference. They were a part of the Pac-12 tournament they played against the Utah in the Quarterfinals and won in 2OT by the score of 91–85, they would move on to the semifinals but would lose to Colorado and would be eliminated from the tournament. They would then be invited to compete in the 2021 NCAA tournament and would get wins against Drake, Kansas, Oregon, but would then be eliminated by the Gonzaga Bulldogs in the Elite Eight.

== Off-season ==
=== Departures ===
Name	Number	Pos.	Height	Weight	Year	Hometown	Reason for Departure
Talin Lewis	0	G	6'4"	180	Junior	Westlake Village, CA	Walk-on; left the team
Tahj Eaddy	2	G	6'2"	165	Redshirt Senior	West Haven, CT	Declared for the 2021 NBA draft; went Undrafted
Evan Mobley	4	F	7'0"	215	Freshman	Murrieta, CA	Declared for the 2021 NBA draft; selected 3rd overall pick by the Cleveland Cavaliers
McKay Anderson	14	G	6'5"	190	Redshirt Senior	La Cañada, CA	Walk-on; graduated
Noah Baumann	30	G	6'6"	215	Redshirt Junior	Phoenix, AZ	Transferred to Georgia

=== Incoming transfers ===
Name	Number	Pos.	Height	Weight	Year	Hometown	Notes
Boogie Ellis	0	G	6'3"	185	Junior	San Diego, CA	Transferred from Memphis. Ellis will have three years of remaining eligibility.

=== 2021 recruiting class ===
College recruiting information
Name	Hometown	School	Height	Weight	Commit date
Harrison Hornery; PF	Toowoomba, Australia	Mater Dei (CA)	6 ft 9 in (2.06 m)	210 lb (95 kg)	Oct 31, 2019
Harrison Hornery; PF	Recruit ratings: Rivals: 247Sports: ESPN: (80)				
Malik Thomas; SG	Fontana, CA	Damien (CA)	6 ft 3 in (1.91 m)	185 lb (84 kg)	Mar 27, 2020
Malik Thomas; SG	Recruit ratings: Rivals: 247Sports: ESPN: (82)				
Kobe Johnson; SG	Milwaukee, WI	Nicolet (WI)	6 ft 5 in (1.96 m)	185 lb (84 kg)	Sep 3, 2020
Kobe Johnson; SG	Recruit ratings: Rivals: 247Sports: ESPN: (79)				
Overall recruit ranking:
Note: In many cases, Scout, Rivals, 247Sports, On3, and ESPN may conflict in their listings of height and weight.; In these cases, the average was taken. ESPN grades are on a 100-point scale.; Sources: "USC 2021 Basketball Commitments". Rivals.; "2021 USC Trojans Recruiting Class". ESPN.; "2021 Team Ranking". Rivals.

=== 2022 Recruiting class ===
College recruiting information (2022)
Name	Hometown	School	Height	Weight	Commit date
Vincent Iwuchukwu #4 C	Nigeria	Montverde Academy (FL)	7 ft 0 in (2.13 m)	220 lb (100 kg)	Sep 17, 2021
Vincent Iwuchukwu #4 C	Recruit ratings: Rivals: 247Sports: ESPN: (92)				
Kijani Wright #5 PF	Los Angeles, CA	Sierra Canyon (CA)	6 ft 9 in (2.06 m)	235 lb (107 kg)	Aug 11, 2021
Kijani Wright #5 PF	Recruit ratings: Rivals: 247Sports: ESPN: (88)				
Tre White #18 SF	Napa, CA	Prolific Prep (CA)	6 ft 6 in (1.98 m)	190 lb (86 kg)	Nov 6, 2021
Tre White #18 SF	Recruit ratings: Rivals: 247Sports: ESPN: (88)				
Oziyah Sellers #24 SG	Modesto, CA	Southern California Academy (CA)	6 ft 5 in (1.96 m)	160 lb (73 kg)	Aug 15, 2021
Oziyah Sellers #24 SG	Recruit ratings: Rivals: 247Sports: ESPN: (81)				
Overall recruit ranking:
Note: In many cases, Scout, Rivals, 247Sports, On3, and ESPN may conflict in their listings of height and weight.; In these cases, the average was taken. ESPN grades are on a 100-point scale.; Sources: "USC 2022 Basketball Commitments". Rivals.; "2022 USC Trojans Recruiting Class". ESPN.; "2022 Team Ranking". Rivals.

== Roster ==
2021–22 USC Trojans men's basketball team
Players
Coaches

Pos.	#	Name	Height	Weight	Year	Previous school	Hometown
G	0	Boogie Ellis	6 ft 3 in (1.91 m)	185 lb (84 kg)	Jr	Memphis	San Diego, CA
F	1	Chevez Goodwin	6 ft 9 in (2.06 m)	225 lb (102 kg)	RS Sr	Wofford	Columbia, SC
F	2	Kobe Johnson	6 ft 6 in (1.98 m)	190 lb (86 kg)	Fr	Nicolet HS	Milwaukee, WI
F	3	Isaiah Mobley	6 ft 10 in (2.08 m)	240 lb (109 kg)	Jr	Rancho Christian School	Murrieta, CA
G	4	Malik Thomas	6 ft 4 in (1.93 m)	205 lb (93 kg)	Fr	Damien HS	Fontana, CA
G	5	Isaiah White	6 ft 7 in (2.01 m)	210 lb (95 kg)	RS Sr	Utah Valley	Rancho Cucamonga, CA
F	12	Boubacar Coulibaly	6 ft 10 in (2.08 m)	215 lb (98 kg)	So	San Gabriel Academy	Bamako, Mali
G	13	Drew Peterson	6 ft 9 in (2.06 m)	195 lb (88 kg)	Sr	Rice	Libertyville, IL
G	15	Zach Brooker (W)	6 ft 0 in (1.83 m)	160 lb (73 kg)	So	Sierra Canyon School	Calabasas, CA
G	20	Ethan Anderson	6 ft 1 in (1.85 m)	210 lb (95 kg)	Jr	Fairfax HS	Los Angeles, CA
G	21	Reese Dixon-Waters	6 ft 5 in (1.96 m)	210 lb (95 kg)	So	St. Bernard HS	Long Beach, CA
F	23	Max Agbonkpolo	6 ft 9 in (2.06 m)	195 lb (88 kg)	Jr	Santa Margarita Catholic HS	Laguna Niguel, CA
F	24	Joshua Morgan	6 ft 11 in (2.11 m)	220 lb (100 kg)	RS So	Long Beach State	Sacramento, CA
F	30	Harrison Hornery	6 ft 9 in (2.06 m)	220 lb (100 kg)	Fr	Mater Dei HS	Toowoomba, Australia
G	32	Reggie Parris (W)	6 ft 4 in (1.93 m)	190 lb (86 kg)	Sr	San Diego	Denver, CO
G	55	Amar Ross (W)	5 ft 8 in (1.73 m)	150 lb (68 kg)	Sr	Bethesda	Long Beach, CA

Head coach

- Andy Enfield (Johns Hopkins)

Assistant coach(es)

- Chris Capko (South Florida)
- Eric Mobley (Portland)
- Jay Morris (Cal State Dominguez Hills)

Legend

- (C) Team captain
- (S) Suspended
- (I) Ineligible
- (W) Walk-on
- Injured
- Current redshirt

Roster
Last update: October 2, 2021

== Schedule and results ==
Date time, TV	Rank^{#}	Opponent^{#}	Result	Record	High points	High rebounds	High assists	Site (attendance) city, state
Regular season
November 9, 2021*; 6:00 pm, P12N		Cal State Northridge	W 89–49	1–0	20 – Ellis	9 – Mobley	3 – Mobley	Galen Center (3,321); Los Angeles, CA
November 13, 2021*; 4:00 pm, ESPN+		at Temple	W 76–71	2–0	19 – Goodwin	8 – Tied	8 – Peterson	Liacouras Center (5,323); Philadelphia, PA
November 16, 2021*; 3:00 pm, ESPNU	No. 25	at Florida Gulf Coast	W 78–61	3–0	20 – Goodwin	9 – Mobley	6 – Tied	Alico Arena (4,509); Fort Myers, FL
November 22, 2021*; 8:00 pm, P12N	No. 24	Dixie State	W 98–71	4–0	19 – Ellis	11 – Goodwin	4 – Mobley	Galen Center (2,189); Los Angeles, CA
November 25, 2021*; 6:30 pm, ESPN2	No. 24	vs. Saint Joseph's; Wooden Legacy Semifinal	W 70–55	5–0	17 – Ellis	11 – Mobley	4 – Tied	Anaheim Convention Center (0); Anaheim, CA
November 26, 2021*; 8:30 p.m., ESPN2	No. 24	vs. San Diego State; Wooden Legacy championship	W 58–43	6–0	18 – Mobley	12 – Mobley	4 – Anderson	Anaheim Convention Center (2,890); Anaheim, CA
December 1, 2021; 8:30 p.m., P12N	No. 20	Utah	W 93–73	7–0 (1–0)	21 – Mobley	13 – Mobley	4 – Tied	Galen Center (3,754); Los Angeles, CA
December 4, 2021; 3:00 p.m., P12N	No. 20	at Washington State	W 63–61	8–0 (2–0)	14 – Goodwin	6 – Peterson	4 – Anderson	Beasley Coliseum (4,069); Pullman, WA
December 7, 2021*; 7:00 p.m., P12N	No. 16	Eastern Kentucky	W 80–68	9–0	23 – Mobley	13 – Mobley	5 – Tied	Galen Center (2,608); Los Angeles, CA
December 12, 2021*; 2:00 p.m., P12N	No. 16	Long Beach State	W 73–62	10–0	21 – Mobley	12 – Mobley	4 – Anderson	Galen Center (5,561); Los Angeles, CA
December 15, 2021*; 6:00 p.m., P12N	No. 10	UC Irvine	W 66–61	11–0	23 – Goodwin	12 – Mobley	5 – Peterson	Galen Center (3,253); Los Angeles, CA
December 18, 2021*; 1:00 p.m., P12N	No. 10	vs. Georgia Tech; Jerry Colangelo Classic	W 67–53	12–0	16 – Ellis	8 – Tied	4 – Peterson	Footprint Center (7,821); Phoenix, AZ
December 21, 2021*; 6:00 p.m., ESPNU	No. 8	vs. Oklahoma State; Compete 4 Cause Classic	Canceled due to COVID-19 issues					Paycom Center; Oklahoma City, OK
January 6, 2022; 8:00 p.m., FS1	No. 7	at California	W 77–63	13–0 (3–0)	19 – Mobley	9 – Tied	3 – Anderson	Haas Pavilion (4,811); Berkeley, CA
January 11, 2022 (Note: This game was originally scheduled for January 8 before being postponed and rescheduled for January 11 due to COVID-19 protocols within the Stanford program.); 7:00 p.m., ESPN2	No. 5	at Stanford	L 69–75	13–1 (3–1)	16 – Mobley	7 – Mobley	5 – Mobley	Maples Pavilion (100); Stanford, CA
January 13, 2022; 8:00 p.m., ESPNU	No. 5	Oregon State	W 81–71	14–1 (4–1)	20 – Goodwin	12 – Goodwin	4 – Mobley	Galen Center (0); Los Angeles, CA
January 15, 2022; 8:00 p.m., FS1	No. 5	Oregon	L 69–79	14–2 (4–2)	18 – Tied	9 – Mobley	4 – Mobley	Galen Center (0); Los Angeles, CA
January 20, 2022; 4:30 p.m., P12N	No. 16	at Colorado	W 61–58	15–2 (5–2)	14 – Goodwin	18 – Goodwin	3 – Mobley	CU Events Center (7,475); Boulder, CO
January 22, 2022; 3:30 p.m., P12N	No. 16	at Utah	W 79–67	16–2 (6–2)	23 – Peterson	6 – Mobley	5 – Mobley	Jon M. Huntsman Center (7,846); Salt Lake City, UT
January 24, 2022 (Note: This game was originally scheduled for December 30 before being postponed and rescheduled for January 24 due to COVID-19 protocols within the USC program.); 8:00 p.m., ESPN	No. 15	Arizona State	W 78–56	17–2 (7–2)	16 – Peterson	8 – Goodwin	Johnson – 5	Galen Center (2,438); Los Angeles, CA
January 27, 2022; 8:00 p.m., FS1	No. 15	Stanford	L 61–64	17–3 (7–3)	14 – Peterson	7 – Tied	9 – Mobley	Galen Center (4,148); Los Angeles, CA
January 29, 2022; 4:00 p.m., P12N	No. 15	California	W 79–72	18–3 (8–3)	24 – Mobley	6 – Mobley	5 – Anderson	Galen Center (4,293); Los Angeles, CA
February 3, 2022; 8:00 p.m., ESPN2	No. 19	at Arizona State	W 58–53	19–3 (9–3)	21 – Ellis	13 – Peterson	3 – Ellis	Desert Financial Arena (7,246); Tempe, AZ
February 5, 2022; 2:00 p.m., FOX	No. 19	at No. 7 Arizona	L 63–72	19–4 (9–4)	15 – Mobley	8 – Peterson	5 – Ellis	McKale Center (14,644); Tucson, AZ
February 8, 2022*; 7:00 p.m., P12N	No. 21	Pacific	W 74–68	20–4	13 – Ellis	6 – Tied	8 – Peterson	Galen Center (2,189); Los Angeles, CA
February 12, 2022; 7:00 p.m., ESPN	No. 21	No. 12 UCLA; Rivalry	W 67–64	21–4 (10–4)	27 – Peterson	12 – Peterson	4 – Peterson	Galen Center (10,258); Los Angeles, CA
February 17, 2022; 8:30 p.m., P12N	No. 17	Washington	W 79–69	22–4 (11–4)	24 – Goodwin	9 – Goodwin	8 – Mobley	Galen Center (3,218); Los Angeles, CA
February 20, 2022; 4:30 p.m., P12N	No. 17	Washington State	W 62–60	23–4 (12–4)	21 – Ellis	9 – Mobley	4 – Mobley	Galen Center (4,268); Los Angeles, CA
February 24, 2022; 8:00 p.m., ESPN2	No. 16	at Oregon State	W 94–91 ^{2OT}	24–4 (13–4)	23 – Peterson	10 – Tied	6 – Anderson	Gill Coliseum (3,685); Corvallis, OR
February 26, 2022; 7:00 p.m., ESPN2	No. 16	at Oregon	W 70–69	25–4 (14–4)	20 – Peterson	9 – Mobley	4 – Anderson	Matthew Knight Arena (10,021); Eugene, OR
March 1, 2022 (Note: This game was originally scheduled for January 2 before being postponed and rescheduled for March 1 due to COVID-19 protocols within the USC program.); 8:00 p.m., ESPN	No. 16	No. 2 Arizona	L 71–93	25–5 (14–5)	14 – Agbonkpolo	11 – Mobley	4 – Peterson	Galen Center (10,258); Los Angeles, CA
March 5, 2022; 7:00 p.m., ESPN	No. 16	at No. 17 UCLA; Rivalry	L 68–75	25–6 (14–6)	20 – Mobley	9 – Peterson	6 – Peterson	Pauley Pavilion (13,659); Los Angeles, CA
Pac-12 Tournament
March 10, 2022; 8:30 p.m., FS1	(3) No. 21	vs. (6) Washington; Quarterfinals	W 65–61	26–6	17 – Ellis	9 – Mobley	6 – Mobley	T-Mobile Arena (10,417); Paradise, NV
March 11, 2022; 8:30 p.m., FS1	(3) No. 21	vs. (2) No. 13 UCLA; Semifinals/Rivalry	L 59–69	26–7	27 – Ellis	7 – Tied	1 – Tied	T-Mobile Arena (14,158); Paradise, NV
NCAA tournament
March 18, 2022; 12:10 p.m., TruTV	(7 MW) No. 22	vs. (10 MW) Miami (FL); First Round	L 66–68	26–8	17 – Peterson	6 – Goodwin	8 – Mobley	Bon Secours Wellness Arena (14,255); Greenville, SC
*Non-conference game. ^{#}Rankings from AP Poll. (#) Tournament seedings in parentheses. MW=Midwest. All times are in Pacific Time.

== Game summaries ==
=== Cal State Northridge Matadors vs USC Trojans ===
P12N

November 9
6:00 PM

Cal State Northridge 49, USC Trojans 89
Scoring by half: 19-52, 30-37
Pts: Boogie Ellis, 20; Rebs: Isaiah Mobley, 9 Asts: Isaiah Mobley, 3	Pts: Darius Brown II, Atin Wright 10; Rebs: Darius Brown II, 6 Asts: Elijah Hardy, 3

Galen Center (Los Angeles)
Attendance: 3,321
Referees: John Higgins, Jimmy Casas, Michael Mojica

=== USC Trojans vs Temple Owls ===
ESPN+

November 13
4:00 PM PST

USC Trojans 76, Temple Owls 71
Scoring by half: 46-27, 30-47
Pts: Chevez Goodwin, 19; Rebs: Chevez Goodwin, Isaiah Mobley 8 Asts: Drew Peterson, 8	Pts: Khalif Battle, 26; Rebs: Nick Jourdain, 9 Asts: Jeremiah Williams, 5

Liacouras Center ([Philadelphia)
Attendance: 5,323
Referees: Rob Rorke, Chuck Jones, Terry Oglesby

=== No. 25 USC Trojans vs Florida Gulf Coast Eagles ===
ESPNU

November 16
6:00 PM PST

USC Trojans 78, Florida Gulf Coast Eagles 61
Scoring by half: 35-27, 43-34
Pts: Chevez Goodwin, 20; Rebs: Isaiah Mobley, 9 Asts: Boogie Ellis, Isaiah Mobley 6	Pts: Cyrus Largie, 20; Rebs: Kevin Samuel, 8 Asts: Luis Rolen, 6

Alico Arena (Fort Myers, Florida)
Attendance: 4,509
Referees: Josue Nieves, Wil Howard, Mike Nance

=== Dixie State Trailblazers vs No. 24 USC Trojans ===
P12N

November 22
8:00 PM PST

Dixie State 71, USC Trojans 98
Scoring by half: 36-47, 35-51
Pts: Cameron Gooden, Frank Staine 17; Rebs: Hunter Schofield, 8 Asts: Cameron Gooden, Brock Gilbert 4	Pts: Boogie Ellis, 19; Rebs: Chevez Goodwin, 11; Asts: Isaiah Mobley, 4

Galen Center (Los Angeles)
Attendance: 2,189
Referees: D.G. Nelson, James Ford, Verne Harris

=== No.24 USC Trojans vs Saint Joseph's Hawks ===
Wooden Legacy semifinals

ESPN2

November 25
6:30 PM PST

USC Trojans 70, Saint Joseph 55
Scoring by half: 38-26, 32-29
Pts: Boogie Ellis, 17; Rebs: Isaiah Mobley, 11; Asts: Boogie Ellis, Drew Peterson 4	Pts: Ejike Obinna, 18; Rebs: Ejike Obinna, 10; Asts: Erik Reynolds II, 4

Anaheim Arena (Anaheim, California)
Referees: Larry Spaulding, AJ Desai, Chris Rastatter

=== No. 24 USC Trojans vs San Diego State Aztecs ===
Wooden Legacy Championship Game

ESPN2

November 26
8:30 PM PST

USC Trojans 58, San Diego State 43
Scoring by half: 22-15, 36-28
Pts: Isaiah Mobley, 18; Rebs: Isaiah Mobley, 12; Asts: Ethen Anderson, 4	Pts: Trey Pulliam, 11; Rebs: Nathan Mensah, 7 Asts: Matt Bradley, 2

Anaheim Arena (Anaheim, California)
Attendance: 2,890
Referees: Larry Spaulding, Deron White, Chris Rastatter

=== Utah Runnin' Utes vs No. 20 USC Trojans ===
P12N

December 1
8:30 PM PST

Utah 73, USC Trojans 93
Scoring by half: 28-48, 45-45
Pts: Both Gach, 28; Rebs: Lahat Thioune, 11; Asts: Rollie Worster, 4	Pts: Isaiah Mobley, 21; Rebs: Isaiah Mobley, 13; Asts: Boogie Ellis, Drew Peterson 4

Galen Center (Los Angeles)
Attendance: 3,754
Referees: Davis Hall, Michael Irving, Kipp Kissinger

=== No. 20 USC Trojans vs Washington State Cougars ===
P12N

December 4
3:00 PM PST

USC Trojans 63, Washington State 61
Scoring by half: 30-32, 33-29
Pts: Chavez Goodwin, 14; Rebs: Drew Peterson, 6 Asts: Ethan Anderson, 4	Pts: Michael Flowers, 13; Rebs: Dishon Jackson, 7 Asts: Noah WIlliams, 2

Beasley Coliseum (Pullman, Washington)
Attendance: 4,069
Referees: Mike Scyphers, Verne Harris, Chris Rastatter

=== Eastern Kentucky Colonels vs No. 16 USC Trojans ===
P12N

December 7
7:00 PM PST

Eastern Kentucky 68, USC Trojans 80
Scoring by half: 25-41, 43-39
Pts: Braxton Beverly, 16; Rebs: Curt Lewis, 6 Asts: Braxton Beverly, 4	Pts: Isaiah Mobley, 23; Rebs: Isaiah Mobley, 12; Asts: Isaiah Mobley, Max Agbonkpolo, Boogie Ellis 5

Galen Center (Los Angeles)
Attendance: 2,608
Referees: Larry Spaulding, Frank Harvey III, Randy McCall

=== Long Beach State vs No. 16 USC Trojans ===
P12N

December 12
2:00 PM PST

Long Beach State 62, USC Trojans 73
Scoring by half: 38-38, 24-35
Pts: Joel Murray, 14; Rebs: Romelle Mansel, 7 Asts: Joe; Murray, 3	Pts: Isaiah Mobley, 21; Rebs: Isaiah Mobley, 12; Asts: Drew Peterson, 5

Galen Center (Los Angeles)
Attendance: 5,561
Referees: D.G. Nelson, Gregory Nixon, Tony Padilla

=== UC Irvine Anteaters vs No. 10 USC Trojans ===
P12N

December 15
6:00 PM PST

UC Irvine 61, USC Trojans 66
Scoring by half: 36-28, 25-38
Pts: Collin Welp, 24; Rebs: Austin Johnson, 9 Asts: DJ Davis, 2

Galen Center, Los Angeles, CA
Attendance: 3,253
Referees: Casey McClellan, Nate Harris, Randy McCall

=== Georgia Tech Yellow Jackets vs No. 10 USC Trojans ===
P12N

December 18
1:00 PM PST

Georgia Tech 53, USC Trojans 67
Scoring by half: 24-33, 29-34
Pts: Michael Devoe, 25; Rebs: Khalid Moore, 8 Asts: Khalid Moore, 2	Pts: Boogie Ellis, 16; Rebs: Drew Peterson, Chevez Goodwin 8 Asts: Drew Peterson, 4

Footprint Center (Phoenix, Arizona)
Attendance: 7,821
Referees: Rob Riley, Kipp Kissinger, Greg Nixon

=== Oklahoma State ===
- Notes: Game with Oklahoma State on December 21 was Canceled due to COVID-19 Issues.

=== Arizona State and No. 9 Arizona ===
- Notes: Games with Arizona State on December 30 and No. 9 Arizona on January 2 were postponed due to COVID-19 Issues and will be rescheduled.

=== No. 7 USC Trojans vs California Golden Bears ===
FS1

January 6
8:00 PM PST

USC Trojans 77, California 63
Scoring by half: 36-31, 41-32
Pts: Isaiah Mobley, 19; Rebs: Drew Pederson, Isaiah Mobley, 9 Asts: Ethan Andreson, 3	Pts: Grant Anticevich, 19; Rebs: Andre Kelly. 11; Asts: Joel Brown, 9

Haas Pavilion (Berkeley, California)
Attendance: 4,811
Referees: Jimmy Casas, Larry Spaulding, Michael Irving

=== No. 5 USC Trojans vs Stanford Cardinal ===
ESPN2

January 11
7:00 PM PST

USC Trojans 69, Stanford 75
Scoring by half: 33-32, 36-43
Pts: Isaiah Mobley, 16; Rebs: Isaiah Mobley, 7 Asts: Isaiah Mobley, 5	Pts: Harrison Ingram, Spencer Jones 21; Rebs: Harrison Ingram, 10; Asts: Michael O'Connell, 7

Maples Pavilion (Stanford, California)
Attendance: 100
Referees: Jim Schipper, Michael Greenstein, David Hall

=== Oregon State Beavers vs No. 5 USC Trojans ===
ESPNU

January 13
8:00 PM PST

Oregon State 71, USC Trojans 81
Scoring by half: 42-37, 29-44
Pts: Chavez Goodwin, 20; Rebs: Chavez Goodwin, 12; Asts: Isaiah Mobley, 4	Pts: Jarod Lucas, 27; Rebs: Warith Alatishe, 8 Asts: Dashawn Davis, 7

Galen Center (Los Angeles)
Attendance: 0
Referees: Marques Pettigrew, Kelly Pfeifer, Gerry Pollard

=== Oregon Ducks vs No. 5 USC Trojans ===
FS1

January 15
8:00 PM PST

Oregon 79, USC Trojans 69
Scoring by half: 45-29, 34-40
Pts: Will Richardson, 28; Rebs: N'Faly Dante, 7 Asts: Will Richardson, Jacob Young 4	Pts: Isaiah Mobley, Boogie Ellis 18; Rebs: Isaiah Mobley, 9 Asts: Isaiah Mobley, 4

Galen Center (Los Angeles)
Attendance: 0
Referees: Randy McCall, D.G. Nelson, Wilson Holland

=== No. 16 USC Trojans vs Colorado Buffaloes ===
P12N

January 20
4:30 PM PST

USC Trojans 61, Colorado 58
Scoring by half: 25-25, 36-33
Pts: Chavez Goodwin, 14; Rebs: Chavez Goodwin, 18; Asts: Isaiah Mobley, 3	Pts: Jabari Walker, 13; Rebs: Nique Clifford, 7 Asts: Evan Battey, 3

CU Events Center (Boulder, Colorado)
Attendance: 7,475
Referees: Frank Harvey III, Chris Rastatter, Tony Padilla

=== No. 16 USC Trojans vs Utah Runnin' Utes ===
P12N

January 22
3:30 PM PST

USC Trojans 79, Utah 67
Scoring by half: 35-30, 44-37
Pts: Drew Peterson, 23; Rebs: Isaiah Mobley, 7 Asts: Isaiah Mobley 5	Pts: Gabe Madsen, 20; Rebs: Marco Anthony, Dusan Mahorici 5 Asts: Rollie Worster, 6

Jon M. Huntsman Center (Salt Lake City)
Attendance: 7,846
Referees: Larry Spaulding, Chuck Jones, Scott Brown

=== Arizona State Sun Devils vs USC Trojans ===
ESPN

January 24
8:00 PM PST

Arizona State vs. USC Trojans

Galen Center (Los Angeles)

=== Stanford Cardinal vs USC Trojans ===
FS1

January 27
8:00 PM PST

Stanford vs. USC Trojans

Galen Center (Los Angeles)

=== California Golden Bears vs USC Trojans ===
P12N

January 29
4:00 PM PST

California vs. USC Trojans

Galen Center (Los Angeles)

=== USC Trojans vs Arizona State Sun Devils ===
ESPN2/ESPNU

February 3
TBD

USC Trojans vs. Arizona State

Desert Financial Arena (Tempe, Arizona)

=== USC Trojans vs Arizona Wildcats ===
Fox

February 5
2:00 PM PST

USC Trojans vs. Arizona

McKale Center (Tucson, Arizona)

=== UCLA Bruins vs USC Trojans ===
ESPN/ESPN2

February 12
7:00 PM PST

UCLA 64, USC Trojans 67

Galen Center (Los Angeles)

=== Washington Huskies vs USC Trojans ===
P12N

February 17
8:30 PM PST

Washington 69, USC Trojans 79

Galen Center (Los Angeles)

=== Washington State Cougars vs USC Trojans ===
P12N

February 20
4:30 PM PST

Washington State 60, USC Trojans 62

Galen Center (Los Angeles)

=== USC Trojans vs Oregon State Beavers ===
ESPN2

February 24
8:00 PM PST

USC Trojans vs. Oregon State

Gill Coliseum (Corvallis, Oregon)

=== USC Trojans vs Oregon Ducks ===
ESPN/ESPN2

February 26
TBD

USC Trojans vs. Oregon

Matthew Knight Arena (Eugene, Oregon)

=== USC Trojans vs UCLA Bruins ===
ESPN

March 5
7:00 PM PST

USC Trojans vs. UCLA

Pauley Pavilion (Los Angeles)

=== Pac-12 Conference tournament Game Summary ===
==== TBD ====
P12N, FS1, FOX

March 9, March 10, March 11, March 12 (All Day)
TBD PST

T-Mobile Arena, Las Vegas, NV

== Rankings ==
Ranking movements Legend: ██ Increase in ranking ██ Decrease in ranking RV = Received votes
	Week																			
Poll	Pre	1	2	3	4	5	6	7	8	9	10	11	12	13	14	15	16	17	18	Final
AP	RV	25	24	20	16	10	8	7	7	5	16	15	19	21	17	16	16	21	22	Not released
Coaches	RV	RV^	25	18	15	9	9	9	8	7	15	15	19	21	17	16	16	21	22	

*AP does not release post-NCAA Tournament rankings.
^Coaches did not release a Week 1 poll.
