= 2022 NCAA Division I men's basketball championship game =

Men's basketball championship game

2022 NCAA Division I men’s basketball championship game
National championship game
North Carolina Tar Heels	Kansas Jayhawks
ACC	Big 12
(29–9)	(33–6)
69	72
Head coach: Hubert Davis	Head coach: Bill Self
- AP: NR
- Coaches: NR
- AP: 3
- Coaches: 3
	1st half	2nd half	Total
North Carolina Tar Heels	40	29	69
Kansas Jayhawks	25	47	72
- Date: April 4, 2022
- Venue: Caesars Superdome, New Orleans, Louisiana
- MVP: Ochai Agbaji, Kansas
- Favorite: Kansas by 4
- Referees: Jeff Anderson, Ron Groover, Terry Oglesby
- Attendance: 69,423
- National anthem: Preservation Hall Jazz Band

United States TV coverage
- Network: TBS, TNT, and truTV
- Announcers: Jim Nantz, Bill Raftery, Grant Hill, and Tracy Wolfson

The championship game of the 2022 NCAA Division I men's basketball tournament was contested on April 4, 2022, at the Caesars Superdome in New Orleans, Louisiana. The game featured the Kansas Jayhawks of the Big 12 Conference and the North Carolina Tar Heels of the Atlantic Coast Conference.

Kansas narrowly defeated North Carolina to claim their first national championship since 2008. The victory marked Kansas's fourth national championship, and their second under head coach Bill Self. Trailing 38–22 near the end of the first half, Kansas rallied from a 16-point deficit for the largest comeback win in the championship game's history. The Jayhawks' Ochai Agbaji was named the Most Outstanding Player (MOP) of the 2022 tournament.

== Participants ==
This was a rematch of the 1957 NCAA Basketball Championship Game, which North Carolina won in triple-overtime over Kansas for their first national championship in school history. It was also the first title game rematch in the NCAA tournament since 1962, and just the third instance of a title game rematch overall (1953, 1962).

=== North Carolina Tar Heels ===
North Carolina was led by first-year head coach Hubert Davis, a former Tar Heels player who took over for Roy Williams, who also coached at Kansas and had recently retired. The Tar Heels were on the bubble for an NCAA Tournament invite with an 18–8 record in mid-February, having suffered double-digit losses to Tennessee, Kentucky, Miami, Wake Forest and Duke. After qualifying for the tournament as a No. 8 seed, they advanced to the title game with wins over Marquette, in the most lopsided NCAA tournament game between a No. 8 seed and a No. 9 seed; UCLA; the defending national champion Baylor; the tournament's Cinderella, Saint Peter's; and their biggest rival, Duke. Guard Caleb Love scored 22 of his game-high 28 points in the second half against Duke. Earlier in the tournament in the Sweet 16, he scored 27 of his game-high 30 in the second half in their win over UCLA. Forward Armando Bacot entered the game averaging over 16 points and 13 rebounds per game, and guard Caleb Love was expected to match up well defensively with Kansas guard Ochai Agbaji. The Tar Heels were attempting to become the second No. 8 seed to win the tournament, joining Villanova in 1985. Davis was seeking to become the first Division I men's basketball coach to win a national championship in his first full season. He was the tenth first-year coach to lead a team to the Final Four.

=== Kansas Jayhawks ===
Kansas was coached by Bill Self, who reached the Final Four for the fourth time in his career. They had seven players returning from their 2019–20 squad, which was 28–3 and odds-on favorite to win the national title before the season was cancelled due to the COVID-19 pandemic. Ochai Agbaji was named an All-American, and led the Big 12 Conference in scoring and was voted the Big 12 Player of the Year. The Jayhawks duo of David McCormack and Mitch Lightfoot provided production on the inside, while guard Remy Martin emerged during the Big 12 tournament, after having struggled with a nagging injury throughout the season. Kansas received the No. 1 seed in the NCAA Tournament's Midwest Regional. On their way to the championship game, the Jayhawks defeated Texas Southern, Creighton, Providence, Miami, and Villanova. Martin was the team's leading scorer for three games during the tournament. After defeating Providence in the Sweet 16, Kansas passed Kentucky for the most wins in Division I men's college basketball history.

== Game summary ==
Kansas won the jump ball to begin the game and opened the scoring 21 seconds later when Ochai Agbaji made a three-point shot. The Jayhawks began the game on a 7–0 run with David McCormack's jumper and a pair of free throws by Jalen Wilson. North Carolina's first points of the game were made by Brady Manek, who made a three-point shot with two and a quarter minutes elapsed. The Tar Heels made up ground and tied the game at 11 points apiece with 13:30 on the clock with a layup by Leaky Black, free throws by Caleb Love, and another layup by Armando Bacot. A free throw by Bacot as part of a three-point play gave North Carolina their first lead, 12–11, but a pair of field goals shortly thereafter by Christian Braun and Mitch Lightfoot gave the edge back to Kansas. Love's three-point shot with 9:21 remaining tied the contest back at 18 points each, and the teams traded field goals for the next three minutes, when the score tied again at 22–22. Manek's three-pointer a few seconds later began a large run for the Tar Heels which saw them score 16 unanswered points. Leading 38–22 with 2:23 until halftime after a pair of free throws made by Bacot, Agbaji made a free throw of his own to end Kansas's scoring drought. From there, Agbaji and Puff Johnson traded field goals in the last thirty seconds of the half, giving North Carolina a 40–25 lead at halftime.

North Carolina began the second half with possession of the ball, but the Jayhawks' offense got them off to a 6–0 run. Love made a three-pointer for North Carolina, pushing the Tar Heels' lead back up to 12 points. The teams traded field goals before Kansas went on another run, this time scoring eight unanswered points by way of Braun, Wilson, Agbaji, and Harris Jr., cutting the lead to four points. Bacot made a free throw to end North Carolina's scoring drought, but a jump shot from McCormack and a layup from Braun narrowed the lead to one point. With 10:53 remaining, Agbaji made a free throw as part of a three-point play to tie the game at 50 points apiece, and a three-pointer by Remy Martin gave Kansas the lead thirty seconds later. Another three-point play by Wilson pushed the Jayhawks' advantage to six points, capping a 31–10 run. North Carolina responded over the next two minutes, evening the score at 57 with 8:17 to play. A pair of three-pointers by Martin and Wilson for Kansas, and two layups from Johnson for North Carolina, kept Kansas' lead at two points entering the game's final five minutes.

The score evened at 65 following two free throws by Manek, and North Carolina took a 69–68 lead with 1:41 remaining following a layup by Manek. After McCormack made a go-ahead jumper at 1:21, Love had his shot blocked out-of-bounds on a drive. After the ensuing inbound, Carolina missed a shot, but the Tar Heels got the offensive rebound. Bacot received the ball and was driving to the basket when he turned his ankle and fell to the ground in pain (due to the floor giving out). He turned the ball over, then limped off the court and was not able to return. Manek then guarded McCormack instead of Bacot, who was a better defender, and the Jayhawks' big man made a jumper over Manek to increase the lead to three. The Tar Heels missed their final four shots, including Love's desperation three-pointer at the final buzzer. The Jayhawks won 72–69, outscoring the Tar Heels 47–29 in the second half.

The 16-point deficit that Kansas overcame was the largest ever to win a men's national championship game, surpassing the previous record of 15 points by Loyola-Chicago in 1963. The Jayhawks 15-point hole at halftime was the largest second-half comeback in a championship, eclipsing Kentucky's 10-point rally in 1998. Agbaji finished with 12 points and was named the NCAA Tournament MOP. McCormack and Wilson led the Jayhawks with 15 points each. Braun scored 10 of his 12 in the second half, when Martin also had 11 of his 14. Bacot ended with 15 points and 15 rebounds, becoming the first to record a double-double in all six tournament games. North Carolina made just 11 of its 40 shots in the second half. This was Kansas's fourth national championship in school history and the second under head coach Bill Self.

TBS

April 4, 2022
8:20 p.m. CDT

Box score

#E8 North Carolina Tar Heels 69, #MW1 Kansas Jayhawks 72
Scoring by half: 40-25, 29-47
Pts: Armando Bacot, R. J. Davis – 15; Rebs: Armando Bacot – 15; Asts: Four tied – 2	Pts: Jalen Wilson, David McCormack – 15; Rebs: Christian Braun – 12; Asts: Dajuan Harris Jr., Christian Braun – 3

Caesars Superdome – New Orleans, Louisiana
Attendance: 69,423
Referees: Jeff Anderson, Ron Groover, Terry Oglesby

Starters:			Pts	Reb	Ast
F	5	Armando Bacot	15	15	2
F	45	Brady Manek	13	13	0
G	4	R. J. Davis	15	12	2
G	2	Caleb Love	13	3	2
G	1	Leaky Black	2	0	2
Reserves:					
G	14	Puff Johnson	11	6	1
F	22	Justin McKoy	0	0	0
Head coach:
Hubert Davis

North Carolina	Kansas

North Carolina	Statistics	Kansas
23/73 (32%)	Field goals	29/66 (44%)
5/23 (22%)	3-pt. field goals	6/17 (35%)
18/22 (82%)	Free throws	8/14 (57%)
24	Offensive rebounds	8
31	Defensive rebounds	27
55	Total rebounds	35
9	Assists	11
13	Turnovers	9
2	Steals	6
6	Blocks	5
13	Fouls	16

Starters:			Pts	Reb	Ast
F	10	Jalen Wilson	15	4	2
F	33	David McCormack	15	10	0
G	3	Dajuan Harris Jr.	2	0	3
G	2	Christian Braun	12	12	3
G	30	Ochai Agbaji	12	3	1
Reserves:					
F	24	K. J. Adams Jr.	0	0	0
F	44	Mitch Lightfoot	2	1	1
G	11	Remy Martin	14	3	1
G	55	Jalen Coleman-Lands	0	1	0
Head coach:
Bill Self

== Media coverage ==
The championship game was televised in the United States by TBS, with TNT and truTV simulcasting the game. Jim Nantz provided play-by-play, while Bill Raftery and Grant Hill provided color commentary. Tracy Wolfson served as the sideline reporter. ESPN International had the international rights to the championship game and the Final Four. It was called by Brian Custer and Jay Bilas.

The game was the third-most-viewed college basketball telecast in cable television history, just one spot behind the Final Four matchup between North Carolina and Duke that was played two days prior. The telecast recorded an average of 18.1 million viewers, up 4 percent from the previous season's championship game.

== See also ==
- 2022 NCAA Division I women's basketball championship game
