= Rémy Martin (disambiguation) =

Rémy Martin is a French company that produces cognac.

Rémy Martin may also refer to:

- Remy Martin (basketball) (born 1998), American basketball player
- Remy Martin (rapper) or Remy Ma (born 1980), American rapper
- Rémy Martin (rugby union) (born 1979), French rugby union footballer
