= Johnny Juzang =

American basketball player (born 2001)

- Juzang with Fenerbahçe in 2026

No. 9 – Fenerbahçe
- Position: Shooting guard / small forward
- League: BSL; EuroLeague

Personal information
- Born: March 17, 2001 (age 25) Los Angeles, California, U.S.
- Listed height: 6 ft 7 in (2.01 m)
- Listed weight: 226 lb (103 kg)

Career information
- High school: Harvard-Westlake School (Los Angeles, California)
- College: Kentucky (2019–2020); UCLA (2020–2022)
- NBA draft: 2022: undrafted
- Playing career: 2022–present

Career history
- 2022–2025: Utah Jazz
- 2022–2024: →Salt Lake City Stars
- 2025–2026: Minnesota Timberwolves
- 2026: Zenit Saint Petersburg
- 2026–present: Fenerbahçe

Career highlights
- Third-team All-American – NABC (2022); First-team All-Pac-12 (2022); Second-team All-Pac-12 (2021)
- Stats at NBA.com
- Stats at Basketball Reference

Jonathan Anh Juzang (/ˈdʒuːzæŋ/; born March 17, 2001) is an American professional basketball player for Fenerbahçe of the Basketbol Süper Ligi (BSL) and the EuroLeague. He played college basketball for the Kentucky Wildcats and the UCLA Bruins. A two-time all-conference selection in the Pac-12, Juzang earned third-team All-American honors as a junior in 2022. As a sophomore, he was named to the All-Tournament Team of the 2021 NCAA tournament, as the Bruins advanced to the Final Four.

== Early life ==
Juzang was born in Los Angeles. His father, Maxie, is Creole, and his mother, Hanh, is Vietnamese. After repeating the eighth grade, Juzang played high school basketball for Harvard-Westlake School in Los Angeles. In his freshman season, he averaged 16.2 points, 7.5 rebounds, and two assists per game and was teammates with Cassius Stanley. Harvard-Westlake won the CIF Southern Section (CIF-SS) Division 1A championship after Juzang recorded 21 points, 11 rebounds and four assists in the final. As a sophomore, he averaged 22.8 points, 9.5 rebounds and 2.8 assists per game, leading his team to a 22–6 record. In his junior season, Juzang averaged 23 points, 8.5 rebounds and 3.4 assists per game and was named the most valuable player of the Mission League. He helped lead Harvard-Westlake to their first league title since 2011 after scoring 25 points in the championship game against rival Loyola.

After the season, Juzang reclassified from the 2020 class to the 2019 class, allowing him to play collegiately in the following season. He was a four-star recruit and one of the top small forwards in his class. On May 10, 2019, he committed to play college basketball for Kentucky over Virginia. He had also been interested in UCLA, but their coach, Steve Alford, was fired, and he did not have time to develop a relationship with their new coach, Mick Cronin, before choosing the Wildcats.

College recruiting
Name	Hometown	School	Height	Weight	Commit date
Johnny Juzang; SF	Los Angeles, CA	Harvard-Westlake School (CA)	6 ft 7 in (2.01 m)	205 lb (93 kg)	May 10, 2019
Johnny Juzang; SF	Recruit ratings: Rivals: 247Sports: ESPN: (89)				
Overall recruit ranking: Rivals: 34 247Sports: 30 ESPN: 29
Note: In many cases, Scout, Rivals, 247Sports, On3, and ESPN may conflict in their listings of height and weight.; In these cases, the average was taken. ESPN grades are on a 100-point scale.; Sources: "Kentucky 2019 Basketball Commitments". Rivals.; "2019 Kentucky Wildcats Recruiting Class". ESPN.; "2019 Team Ranking". Rivals.

== College career ==
=== Kentucky (2019–2020) ===
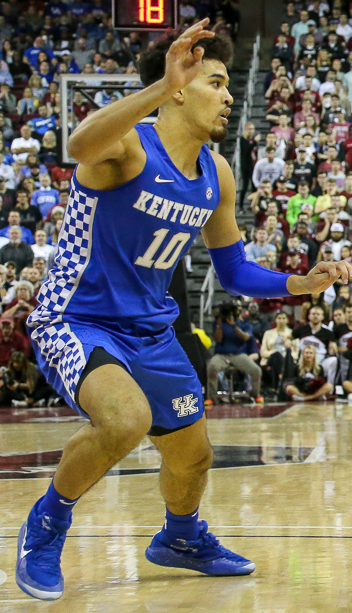
Juzang with Kentucky in 2020

As a freshman at the University of Kentucky, Juzang played behind Tyrese Maxey and Immanuel Quickley and was mostly restricted to catch-and-shoot opportunities in limited playing time. His defense was considered a weakness, and he did not shoot well enough to compel Wildcats coach John Calipari to play him more. On February 8, 2020, Juzang scored a season-high 13 points with three three-pointers in a 77–64 win over Tennessee. He averaged 2.9 points, shooting 37.7 percent from the field, in 12.4 minutes per game for the Wildcats.

=== UCLA (2020–2022) ===
==== Sophomore season (2020–2021) ====
After the season, Juzang announced that he was transferring from Kentucky. He had been lonely without his family, and the COVID-19 pandemic drove his desire to return home. Juzang decided to transfer to UCLA and play under Cronin, and he was granted a waiver to play immediately instead of the usual requirement to sit out a season.

Juzang missed the first four games of the 2020–21 season with a stress reaction in his right foot. In his first game, he scored 10 points off the bench in a win over San Diego. He moved into the starting lineup in the following game against Marquette. On January 14, 2021, Juzang scored a then-career-high 17 points, leading the Bruins in scoring in a 91–61 blowout win over Washington State. On January 24, against Stanford, he scored 27 in a 73–72 loss in overtime, the Bruins' first conference defeat of the season. The game included a stretch where Juzang scored 21 straight points for the team, making eight consecutive shots to end the first half and begin the second. Against Washington, he scored a career-high 32 points in a 64–61 win. He was the first Bruin to score at least half of his team's points in a game since Reggie Miller 35 years earlier. The team's leading scorer, Juzang was a second-team All-Pac-12 selection.

In the 2021 NCAA tournament, Juzang joined Miller and Kareem Abdul-Jabbar, known in college as Lew Alcindor, to become the third player in UCLA history to score at least 20 points in their first two NCAA tournament games. He scored 28 points in a 51–49 win over No. 1 seed Michigan, as UCLA advanced to their first Final Four since 2008. Eighteen of his points came in the first half, which included a run where he scored 12 consecutive for the Bruins. He became the first player to score at least half of his team's points in a regional finals win since Oscar Robertson in 1960. He was named the most outstanding player of the tournament's East Region. Juzang scored 29 points in the national semifinal against 1-seed Gonzaga, including a basket to tie the game with 3.3 seconds remaining in overtime, but the Bulldogs' Jalen Suggs made a 40-foot (12 m) buzzer beater to win 93–90 over the Bruins. Juzang averaged 22.8 points in six games in the tournament, and was named to the 2021 All-Tournament Team. He scored 137 total points, the second most by a UCLA player in NCAA tournament history behind Gail Goodrich's 140 points in 1965. He scored 23 or more points four times in the tournament for a total of eight games with at least 20 during the season.

==== Junior season (2021–2022) ====
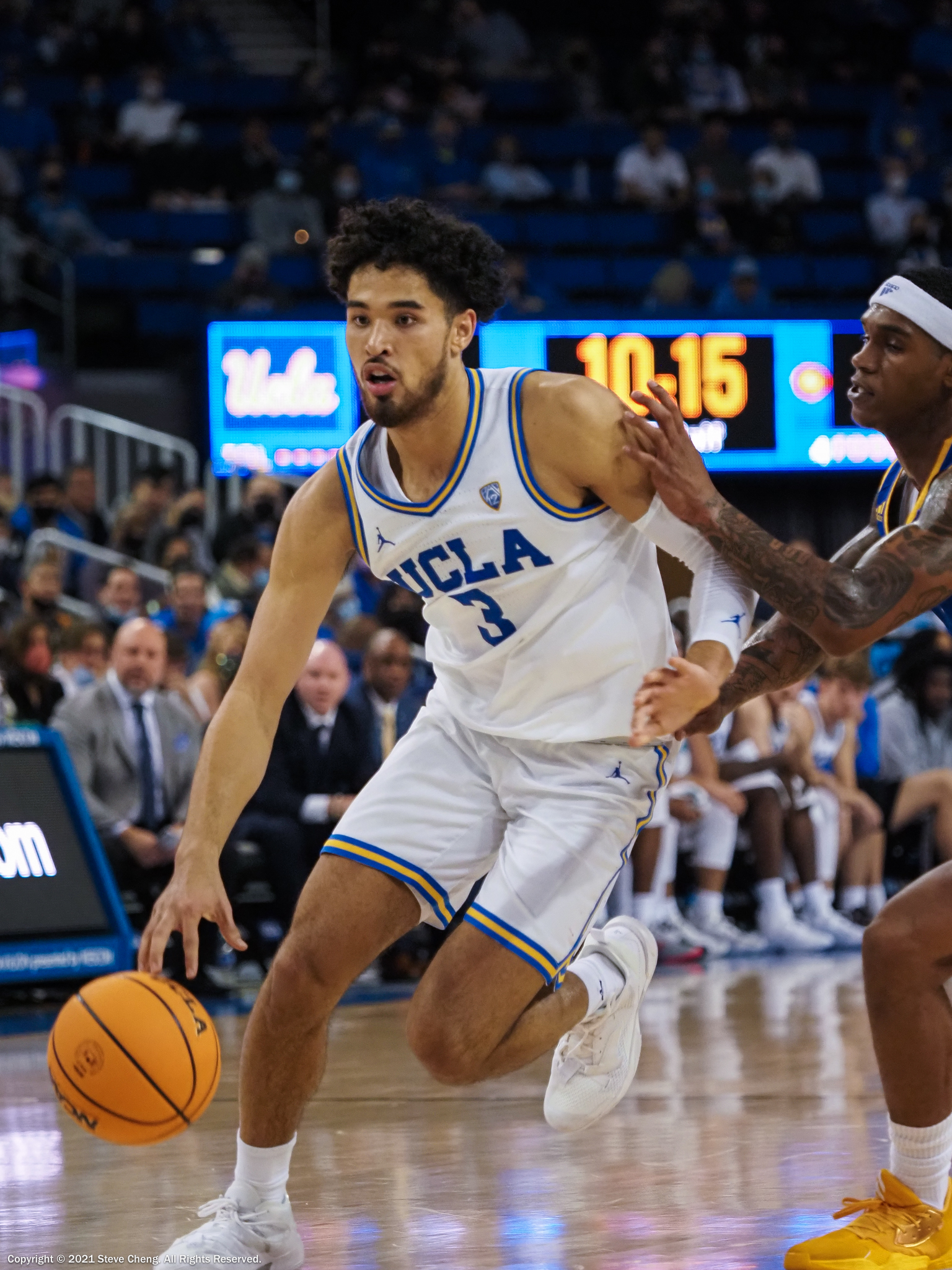
Juzang with UCLA in 2021

During the offseason, Juzang declared for the NBA draft while maintaining his college eligibility. After making it into the first round of some mock drafts but also struggling in a few draft combine games, he decided to return to UCLA and contend for a national championship in 2021–22. Hoping to boost his draft stock, Juzang instead fought injuries, missing one game due to a sore hip from a scooter accident and two others with a sprained right ankle. He was also sidelined for two games after testing positive for COVID-19, and failed to significantly improve on defense during the season. Though he was the focus of opponents' defensive game plans, Juzang largely duplicated his statistics from a year before and remained as UCLA's leading scorer, helping lead the team to a No. 4 seed in the 2022 NCAA tournament. He was named a third-team All-American by the National Association of Basketball Coaches, and was voted to the All-Pac-12 first team. He was also listed on the final national ballot for the John R. Wooden Award, and was a finalist for the Jerry West Award, given to the top shooting guard in the nation. After failing to reach double figures in scoring in four out of six games, Juzang had his best game since his ankle injury with 14 points on 6-of-11 shooting along with eight rebounds in a 72–56 win over Saint Mary's in the second round of the NCAA tournament. He scored 14 again in the Bruins' season-ending 73–66 loss to North Carolina in the Sweet Sixteen, but needed 13 shots and was only 2-of-8 shooting in the second half. After the season, he left UCLA to enter the NBA draft.

== Professional career ==
=== Utah Jazz (2022–2025) ===
Juzang went undrafted in the 2022 NBA draft. He played for the Utah Jazz in the 2022 NBA Summer League, although his debut was delayed after he suffered a concussion in a car crash days after he arrived in Utah. After the summer league, he signed a two-way contract with the Jazz. During the season, he missed over a month with a serious wrist sprain. He made his NBA debut on February 28, 2023 in a 102–94 loss to the San Antonio Spurs, scoring three points.

On July 19, 2023, Juzang signed another two-way contract with the Jazz. In a March 15, 2024 game against the Atlanta Hawks, Juzang scored a then-career-high 19 points on 7-for-11 shooting in 25 minutes off of the bench. Juzang scored a new career high of 27 points against the Golden State Warriors in a regular season game on April 7, 2024. On August 13, he signed a four-year contract with the Jazz. On June 30, 2025, Juzang was waived by the Jazz.

=== Minnesota Timberwolves (2025–2026) ===
On August 1, 2025, Juzang signed a one-year, non-guaranteed contract with the Minnesota Timberwolves. On October 18, the Timberwolves converted him to a two-way contract. He was waived on February 18, 2026, after appearing in 21 games and averaging 2.0 points and 0.8 rebounds in 4.2 minutes for the Timberwolves.

=== Zenit Saint Petersburg (2026) ===
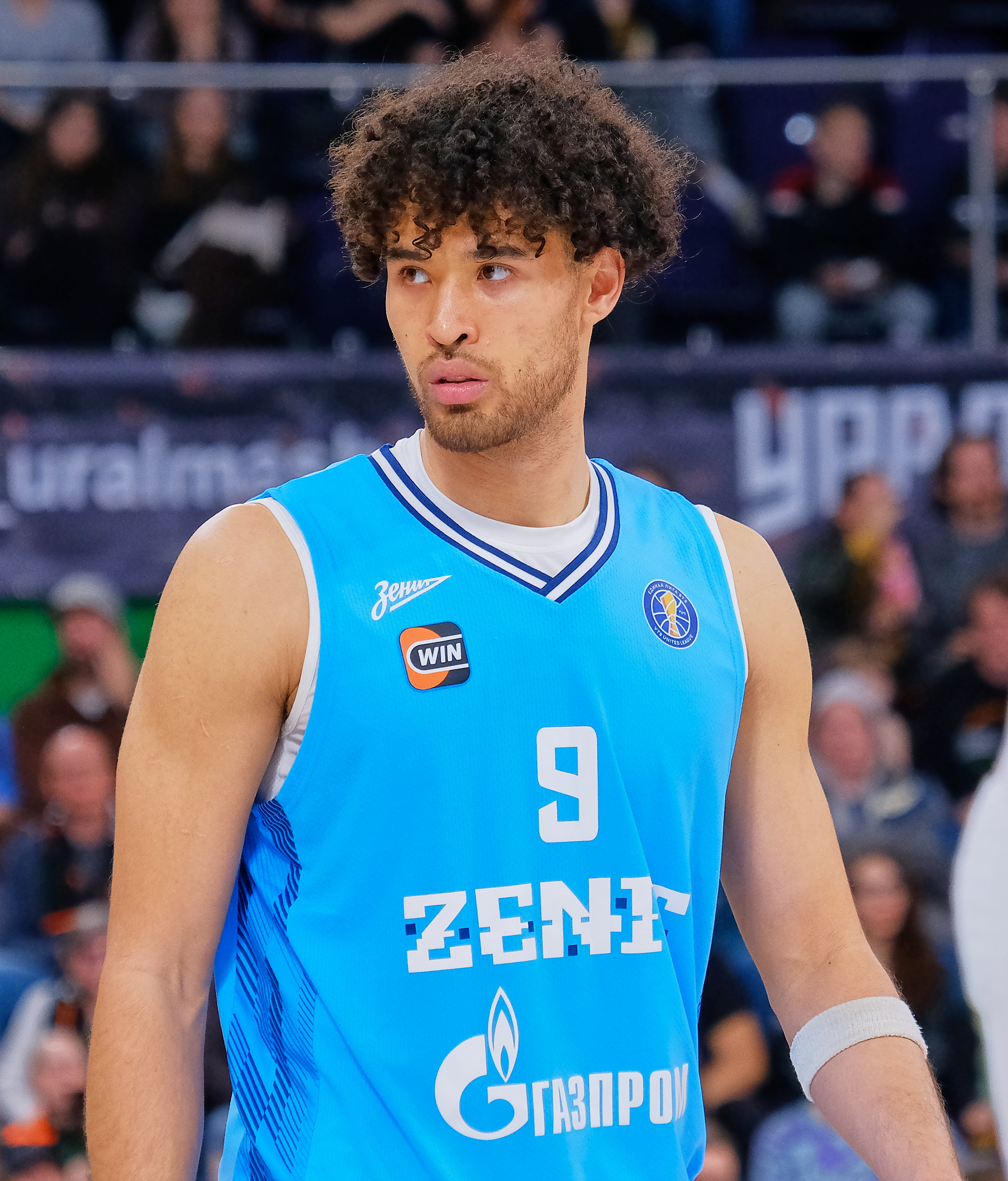
Juzang with Zenit Saint Petersburg in 2026

On February 28, 2026, Juzang signed with Zenit Saint Petersburg of the VTB United League.

=== Fenerbahçe (2026–present) ===
On July 27, 2026, Juzang signed one-year deal with Fenerbahçe of the Turkish Basketbol Süper Ligi (BSL).

== Career statistics ==
Legend
GP	Games played	GS	Games started	MPG	Minutes per game
FG%	Field goal percentage	3P%	3-point field goal percentage	FT%	Free throw percentage
RPG	Rebounds per game	APG	Assists per game	SPG	Steals per game
BPG	Blocks per game	PPG	Points per game	**Bold**	Career high

=== NBA ===
Year	Team	GP	GS	MPG	FG%	3P%	FT%	RPG	APG	SPG	BPG	PPG
2022–23	Utah	18	0	12.9	.337	.238	.500	2.2	.4	.2	**.2**	4.8
2023–24	Utah	20	5	18.6	**.464**	**.416**	.714	1.8	**1.2**	.2	.1	7.2
2024–25	Utah	**64**	**18**	**19.8**	.429	.376	**.849**	**2.9**	1.1	**.6**	.1	**8.9**
2025–26	Minnesota	21	0	4.2	.421	.250	.625	.8	.3	.1	.0	2.0
Career		123	23	16.0	.421	.358	.785	2.2	.0	.4	.1	6.9

=== EuroLeague ===
Year	Team	GP	GS	MPG	FG%	3P%	FT%	RPG	APG	SPG	BPG	PPG	PIR
2026–27	Fenerbahçe	**5**	0	**7.7**	**.600**	**.444**	**1.000**	**1.2**	-	**.2**	**.2**	**4.8**	**4.8**

=== College ===
Year	Team	GP	GS	MPG	FG%	3P%	FT%	RPG	APG	SPG	BPG	PPG
2019–20	Kentucky	28	2	12.3	.377	.326	.833	1.9	.3	.2	.1	2.9
2020–21	UCLA	27	26	**32.3**	**.441**	.353	**.877**	4.1	1.6	**.8**	**.3**	**16.0**
2021–22	UCLA	**30**	**29**	31.8	.432	**.360**	.835	**4.7**	**1.8**	.7	.1	15.6
Career		85	57	25.5	.431	.352	.853	3.6	1.2	.6	.2	11.6

== Personal life ==
Juzang's older brother, Christian, played college basketball as a point guard for Harvard, and played in the Vietnam Basketball Association with the Saigon Heat. He has a younger sister, Lauren.
