= Puff Johnson (basketball) =

American basketball player

Personal information
- Born: October 11, 2000 (age 26) Pittsburgh, Pennsylvania, U.S.
- Listed height: 6 ft 8 in (2.03 m)
- Listed weight: 200 lb (91 kg)

Career information
- High school: Moon Area (Moon Township, Pennsylvania); Hillcrest Prep Academy (Phoenix, Arizona)
- College: North Carolina (2020–2023); Penn State (2023–2025); Ohio State (2025-2026)
- NBA draft: 2026: undrafted
- Position: Small forward

Donovan Christopher "Puff" Johnson (born October 11, 2000) is an American basketball player. He played college basketball for the North Carolina Tar Heels, Penn State Nittany Lions and Ohio State Buckeyes.

== High school career ==
Johnson attended Moon Area High School in Moon Township, Pennsylvania, for three years, helping lead the school to a state championship as a junior. As a senior, Johnson attended Hillcrest Prep in Phoenix, Arizona, where he was coached by former NBA player Mike Bibby. A 4 star recruit, he committed to North Carolina over Arizona.

== College career ==
=== North Carolina ===
Johnson played very little in his freshman season with the Tar Heels and finished the season averaging just 1 point per game. This limited playing time initially continued into his sophomore season while battling through injuries. On February 26, 2022, Johnson scored a career high 16 points in an 84–74 victory over rival NC State.

In the 2022 NCAA Tournament, Johnson emerged as a valuable contributor, helping lead the 8 seeded Tar Heels to the Final Four. In the championship game against Kansas, Johnson scored 11 points off the bench before being forced to exit late in the game after collapsing and vomiting; North Carolina lost 69–72.

In his junior season, Johnson was one of the main rotation players used off the bench for the Tar Heels. Once again hampered by injuries that caused him to miss some time, he appeared in 27 of the team's 33 games. Of his 27 appearances in the 2022–23 season, Johnson made two starts. Usual starter Pete Nance missed two games due to a back injury, so Johnson filled Nance's spot in the lineup while Nance was out. He averaged 4.1 points and 2.7 rebounds per game on the year.

Following the season, Johnson entered his name into the NCAA's transfer portal database, in search of more playing time elsewhere.

=== Penn State ===
Johnson committed to play his senior season at Penn State.

== Career statistics ==
Legend
GP	Games played	GS	Games started	MPG	Minutes per game
FG%	Field goal percentage	3P%	3-point field goal percentage	FT%	Free throw percentage
RPG	Rebounds per game	APG	Assists per game	SPG	Steals per game
BPG	Blocks per game	PPG	Points per game	**Bold**	Career high

=== College ===
Year	Team	GP	GS	MPG	FG%	3P%	FT%	RPG	APG	SPG	BPG	PPG
2020–21	North Carolina	14	0	4.1	.429	.111	**1.000**	.5	.1	.1	.1	1.1
2021–22	North Carolina	24	0	10.4	.459	.231	.722	2.0	.5	.3	.2	3.1
2022–23	North Carolina	27	2	15.9	.387	.283	.658	2.7	.4	.6	0	4.1
2023–24	Penn State	**29**	12	19.7	.422	.333	.785	3.1	.2	.7	.2	7.3
2024–25	Penn State	17	**17**	**23.2**	**.543**	.302	.810	**4.4**	**.6**	**1.4**	**.3**	**10.2**
2025–26	Ohio State	9	1	11.6	.333	**.429**	.667	1.1	.1	.1	0	2.3
Career		120	32	15.1	.447	.296	.753	2.5	.3	.6	.1	5.1

== Personal life ==
Johnson's older brother Cameron played for the Tar Heels from 2017 to 2019, and currently plays for the NBA's Denver Nuggets. Johnson's mother is Croatian American. His nickname "Puff" originated from his enjoyment of Cocoa Puffs when he was young.
