= Myles Johnson =

American basketball player (born 1999)

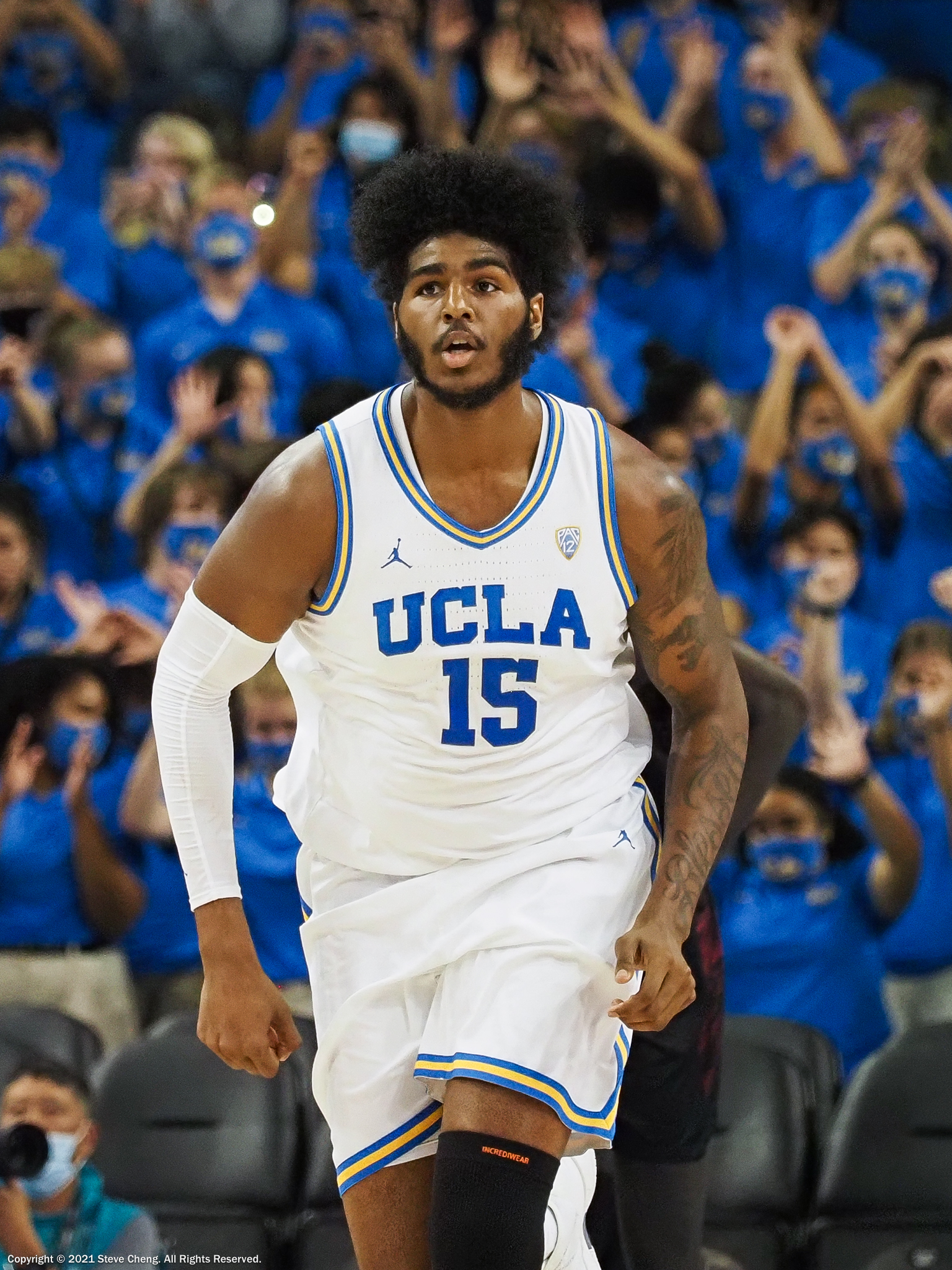
- Johnson with UCLA in 2021

Personal information
- Born: March 18, 1999 (age 27) Torrance, California, U.S.
- Listed height: 6 ft 10 in (2.08 m)
- Listed weight: 255 lb (116 kg)

Career information
- High school: Long Beach Poly (Long Beach, California)
- College: Rutgers (2018–2021); UCLA (2021–2022)
- Position: Center

Career highlights
- Pac-12 All-Defensive Team (2022); Big Ten All-Defensive Team (2021)

Myles Johnson (born March 18, 1999) is an American former basketball player. He played college basketball for the Rutgers Scarlet Knights and the UCLA Bruins. He was named to the all-defensive team in both the Big Ten Conference with Rutgers and the Pac-12 Conference with UCLA.

== High school career ==
Born in Torrance, California, Johnson played basketball for Long Beach Polytechnic High School in Long Beach, California. He missed his entire junior season with a patella injury, which caused Pac-12 college programs to stop recruiting him. As a senior, Johnson was named to the Press-Telegram First Team Dream Team. He committed to playing college basketball for Rutgers over offers from Georgia Tech, Hawaii and Yale. He was drawn to Rutgers' engineering program, and decided on the school before even meeting their basketball team.

== College career ==
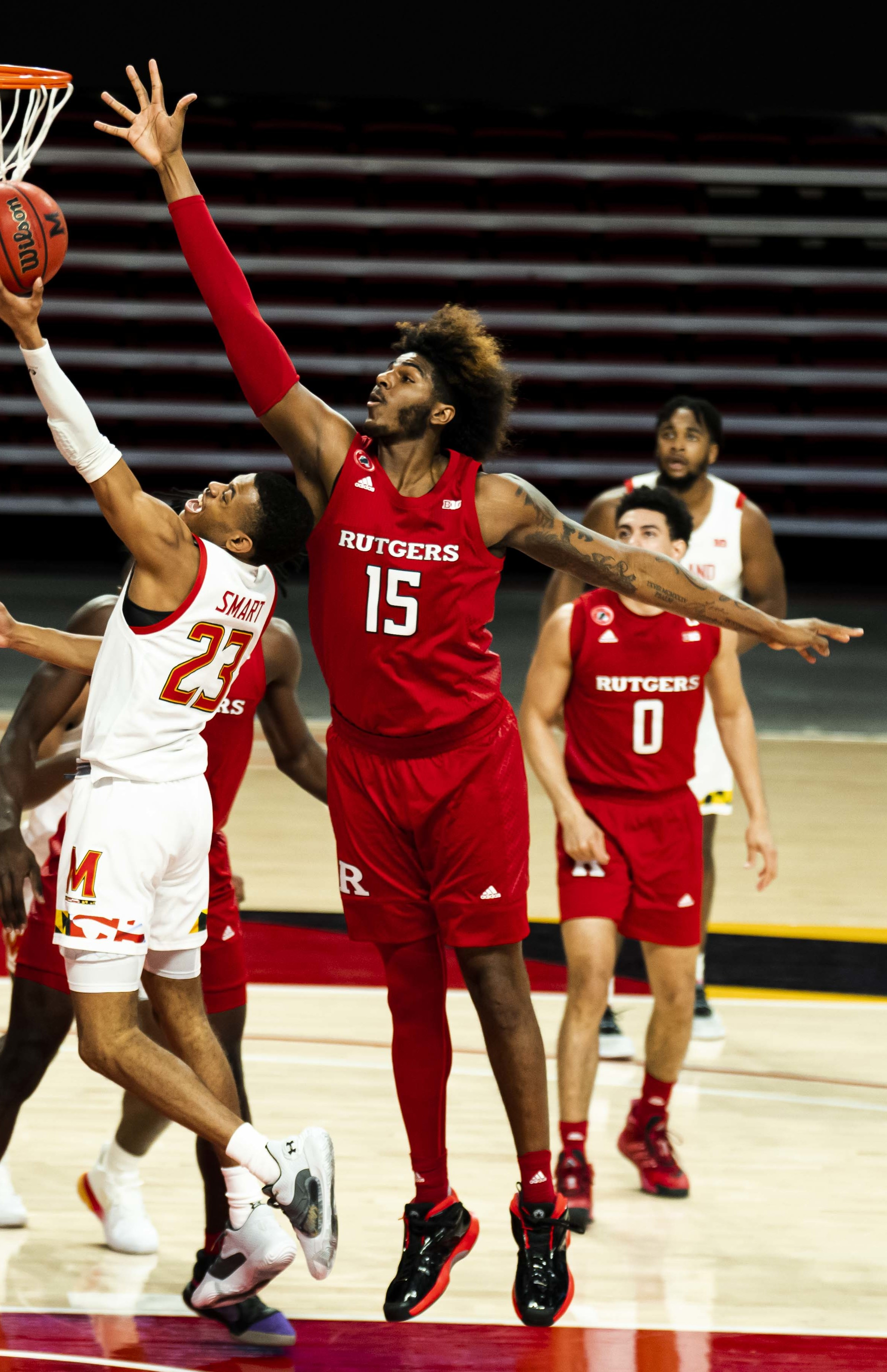
Johnson (No. 15) with Rutgers in 2020

Johnson opted to redshirt his first year at Rutgers University to become stronger and work on his game. As a freshman, he averaged 4.8 points and 5.7 rebounds per game, which ranked third among Big Ten freshman. He posted 18 points and 14 rebounds, both career-highs in a 63–44 victory against Lafayette on December 22, 2019. On January 3, 2020, he scored 18 points and grabbed 14 rebounds in a 79–62 win against Nebraska. In his sophomore season, Johnson entered the starting lineup and averaged 7.8 points, 7.9 rebounds and 1.5 blocks per game. He shot 60.2 percent from the field, which led the Big Ten. As a junior, Johnson averaged eight points, 8.5 rebounds and 2.4 blocks per game, and the Scarlet Knights were selected for the 2021 NCAA tournament. He earned Big Ten All-Defensive Team honors. He completed his undergraduate degree in electrical and computer engineering in May 2021.

In 2021–22, Johnson transferred to the University of California, Los Angeles, choosing the Bruins' program over Stanford's. He filled in for starting forward Cody Riley, who suffered a knee injury in the season opener, which kept him out for almost two months. Johnson played in all 35 games, starting in 15, and averaged 3.6 points, 5.4 rebounds and 1.3 blocks per game. He was named to the Pac-12 All-Defensive Team. After the season, Johnson announced that he would not return for another season and instead planned to focus on completing his master's degree and pursuing a career in engineering. He considered a pro basketball career overseas, but decided against living in a country where he did not speak the language.

== Career statistics ==
Legend
GP	Games played	GS	Games started	MPG	Minutes per game
FG%	Field goal percentage	3P%	3-point field goal percentage	FT%	Free throw percentage
RPG	Rebounds per game	APG	Assists per game	SPG	Steals per game
BPG	Blocks per game	PPG	Points per game	**Bold**	Career high

=== College ===
Year	Team	GP	GS	MPG	FG%	3P%	FT%	RPG	APG	SPG	BPG	PPG
2017–18	Rutgers	Redshirt										
2018–19	Rutgers	31	0	17.6	.555	–	.405	5.7	**1.1**	.7	.7	4.8
2019–20	Rutgers	31	**25**	23.6	.602	.000	.363	7.9	1.0	.5	1.5	7.8
2020–21	Rutgers	28	22	**24.7**	.628	–	.435	**8.5**	.8	**1.1**	**2.4**	**8.0**
2021–22	UCLA	**35**	15	18.1	**.630**	–	**.533**	5.4	.7	.6	1.3	3.6
Career		125	62	20.8	.603	.000	.424	6.8	.9	.7	1.5	5.9

== Personal life ==
Johnson is an electrical and computer engineering major in college. While attending Rutgers University, he founded BLKdev, a nonprofit organization that aims to support black students interested in science, technology, engineering, and mathematics. Johnson was a member of the Rutgers Student-Athlete Advisory Committee. In 2022, he was awarded a Tom Hansen medal by the Pac-12 for his performance and achievement in scholarship, athletics and leadership. His father is an electrician and his aunt is an engineer.
