= David McCormack (basketball) =

American basketball player (born 1999)

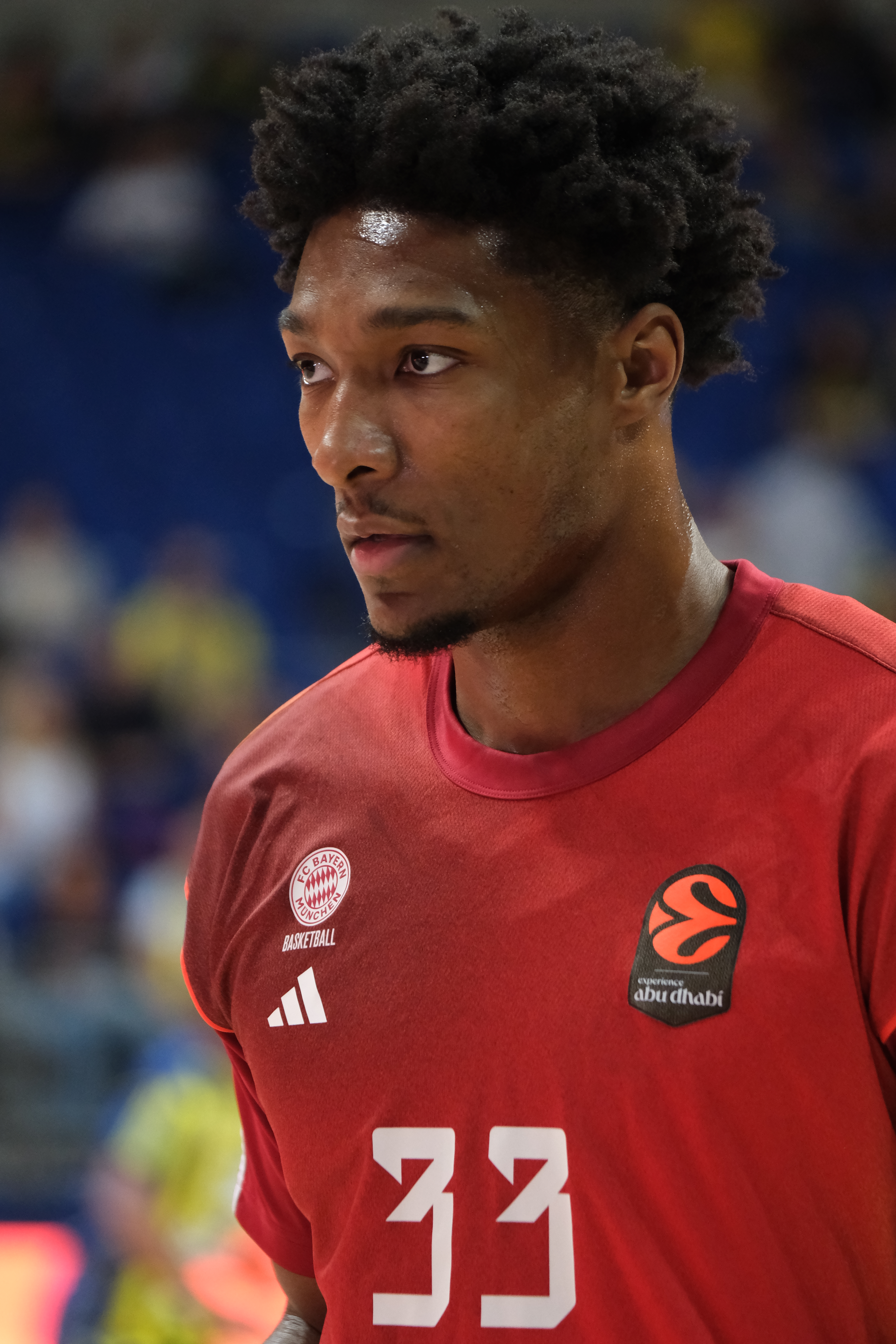
- McCormack with Bayern Munich in 2025

No. 33 – UNICS Kazan
- Position: Center
- League: VTB United League

Personal information
- Born: July 2, 1999 (age 27) Bronx, New York, U.S.
- Listed height: 6 ft 10 in (2.08 m)
- Listed weight: 250 lb (113 kg)

Career information
- High school: Norfolk Academy (Norfolk, Virginia); Oak Hill Academy (Mouth of Wilson, Virginia)
- College: Kansas (2018–2022)
- NBA draft: 2022: undrafted
- Playing career: 2022–present

Career history
- 2022–2023: Beşiktaş
- 2023: Darüşşafaka
- 2023–2024: Galatasaray
- 2024: Olimpia Milano
- 2024–2025: Alba Berlin
- 2025–2026: Bayern Munich
- 2026–present: UNICS Kazan

Career highlights
- NCAA champion (2022); Second-team All-Big 12 (2021); Third-team All-Big 12 (2022); Big 12 Most Improved Player (2021); McDonald's All-American (2018); Nike Hoop Summit (2018)

David Joseph McCormack (born July 2, 1999) is an American professional basketball player for UNICS Kazan of the VTB United League. He played college basketball at the University of Kansas where he won the 2022 National Championship.

== Early life ==
McCormack was born in The Bronx, New York and moved to Norfolk, Virginia at age two. He grew up playing football and basketball, as well as taking part in shot put and discus throw. McCormack played basketball for Norfolk Academy in Norfolk, Virginia before transferring to Oak Hill Academy in Mouth of Wilson, Virginia. He lost about 40 lbs (18 kg) in his first year at Oak Hill. As a senior, he helped his team achieve a 30–4 record and win the 9A state title. McCormack competed alongside Armando Bacot with Team Loaded on the Amateur Athletic Union circuit. He played in the McDonald's All-American Game and Nike Hoop Summit.

A consensus four-star recruit, McCormack committed to playing college basketball for Kansas over offers from Xavier, NC State, Oklahoma State and Duke.

College recruiting
Name	Hometown	School	Height	Weight	Commit date
David McCormack; C	Norfolk, VA	Oak Hill Academy (VA)	6 ft 10 in (2.08 m)	255 lb (116 kg)	Sep 24, 2017
David McCormack; C	Recruit ratings: Rivals: 247Sports: ESPN: (89)				
Overall recruit ranking: Rivals: 35 247Sports: 40 ESPN: 27
Note: In many cases, Scout, Rivals, 247Sports, On3, and ESPN may conflict in their listings of height and weight.; In these cases, the average was taken. ESPN grades are on a 100-point scale.; Sources: "Kansas 2018 Basketball Commitments". Rivals.; "2018 Kansas Jayhawks Recruiting Class". ESPN.; "2018 Team Ranking". Rivals.

== College career ==
As a freshman at Kansas, McCormack averaged 3.9 points and 3.1 rebounds per game. On December 14, 2019, he recorded a sophomore season-high 28 points and seven rebounds in a 98–57 win over UM Kansas City. As a sophomore, McCormack averaged 6.9 points and 4.1 rebounds per game. He became a regular starter in his junior season with the departure of Udoka Azubuike. On January 12, 2021, McCormack posted 24 points, 12 rebounds and three blocks in a 75–70 loss to Oklahoma State. In the NCAA Tournament, he scored 22 points and posted nine rebounds in a first-round victory over Eastern Washington despite playing through pain. As a junior, McCormack averaged 13.4 points and 6.1 rebounds per game, shooting 51.5 percent from the floor. After the season, he underwent surgery to repair a broken bone in his right foot.

In his senior year, on January 4, 2022, McCormack scored 17 points and achieved a career-high 15 rebounds in KU's defeat of Oklahoma State. On January 22, 2022, he got 15 rebounds against Kansas State, tying his personal best in rebounds. He averaged 10.6 points and 6.98 rebounds per game in his senior year. McCormack was named to the Third Team All-Big 12 as a senior. On April 2, 2022, in the 2022 national semifinals against Villanova in New Orleans, McCormack scored 25 points and grabbed 9 rebounds (along with one assist and one steal), leading KU to an 81-65 victory, sending Kansas into the national championship game against North Carolina. In the national championship game against North Carolina on April 4, 2022, McCormack scored 15 points and grabbed 10 rebounds (along with one block and one steal), leading Kansas in the largest comeback in NCAA Tournament history. McCormack was named to the all-tournament team for his play in Kansas' six tourney games, where he averaged 13.1 points a game.

== Professional career ==
=== Beşiktaş (2022–2023) ===
On July 28, 2022, McCormack signed with Beşiktaş Icrypex of the Basketbol Süper Ligi.

=== Darüşşafaka (2023) ===
On July 26, 2023, he signed with Darüşşafaka of the Basketbol Süper Ligi (BSL).

=== Galatasaray Ekmas (2023–2024) ===
On 8 December 2023, he signed with Galatasaray Ekmas of the Turkish Basketbol Süper Ligi (BSL) and the BCL.

=== Olimpia Milano (2024) ===
On August 3, 2024, he signed with Olimpia Milano of the Lega Basket Serie A (LBA).

=== Alba Berlin (2024–2025) ===
On November 24, 2024, McCormack signed with Alba Berlin of the German Basketball Bundesliga (BBL).

=== FC Bayern Munich (2025–2026) ===
On September 23, 2025, he signed with FC Bayern Munich of the German Basketball Bundesliga (BBL) and the EuroLeague. He parted ways with the Germans in August 2026.

=== UNICS Kazan (2026–present) ===
On September 8, 2026, McCormack signed with UNICS Kazan of the VTB United League.

== Career statistics ==
Legend
GP	Games played	GS	Games started	MPG	Minutes per game
FG%	Field goal percentage	3P%	3-point field goal percentage	FT%	Free throw percentage
RPG	Rebounds per game	APG	Assists per game	SPG	Steals per game
BPG	Blocks per game	PPG	Points per game	**Bold**	Career high

=== College ===
Year	Team	GP	GS	MPG	FG%	3P%	FT%	RPG	APG	SPG	BPG	PPG
2018–19	Kansas	34	13	10.7	**.625**	–	.600	3.1	.4	.2	**.4**	3.9
2019–20	Kansas	29	18	14.7	.529	.000	**.813**	4.1	.6	.4	.4	6.9
2020–21	Kansas	29	28	**23.1**	.515	**1.000**	.796	6.1	**1.1**	**.7**	**1.0**	**13.4**
2021–22	Kansas	**40**	**37**	21.9	.508	.000	.756	**7.0**	.9	.6	.8	10.6
Career		132	96	17.7	.527	.200	.760	5.2	.8	.4	.5	8.7
