= Dajuan Harris Jr. =

American basketball player

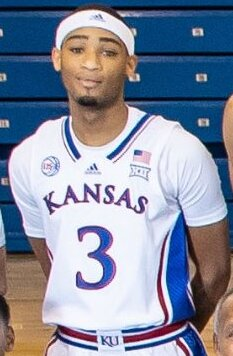
- Harris in 2022

No. 13 – Rio Grande Valley Vipers
- Position: Point guard
- League: NBA G League

Personal information
- Born: December 11, 2000 (age 25) Columbia, Missouri, U.S.
- Listed height: 6 ft 2 in (1.88 m)
- Listed weight: 175 lb (79 kg)

Career information
- High school: Rock Bridge (Columbia, Missouri)
- College: Kansas (2020–2025)
- NBA draft: 2025: undrafted
- Playing career: 2025–present

Career history
- 2025–2026: Iowa Wolves
- 2026–present: Rio Grande Valley Vipers

Career highlights
- NCAA champion (2022); Big 12 Defensive Player of the Year (2023); 3× Big 12 All-Defensive team (2022–2024)

Dajuan Anthony Harris Jr. (born December 11, 2000) is an American professional basketball player for the Rio Grande Valley Vipers of the NBA G League. He played college basketball for the Kansas Jayhawks where he won the 2022 National Championship.

== High school career ==
Harris attended Rock Bridge High School in Columbia, Missouri, where he helped lead the team to two straight Missouri 5A state championship game appearances, finishing runner up in 2018 and winning in 2019. Harris originally committed to playing basketball for Missouri State, but withdrew his commitment, deciding instead to play at the University of Kansas.

== College career ==
Harris redshirted his first year at Kansas. In the 2020–21 season, Harris emerged as a contributor for the Jayhawks, finishing second on the team in assists. For the 2021–22 season Harris became the team's starting point guard and at the end of the season was named a member of the Big 12 All-Defensive team. On February 1, 2022, Harris recorded a career-high 14 points in a 70–61 win over Iowa State. In the 2022 national championship game, Harris had 2 points, 3 assists and a game-high 3 steals. As a junior, he was named Big 12 Defensive Player of the Year.

== Professional career ==
On June 27, 2025, it was reported that Harris would join the Charlotte Hornets for the 2025 NBA Summer League. On August 4, 2025, it was announced that Harris had signed with the Kortrijk Spurs, a Belgian team which is playing in the BNXT League. However, on September 25, Harris parted ways with the team. He then landed with the Rio Grande Valley Vipers of the NBA G League.

== Career statistics ==
Legend
GP	Games played	GS	Games started	MPG	Minutes per game
FG%	Field goal percentage	3P%	3-point field goal percentage	FT%	Free throw percentage
RPG	Rebounds per game	APG	Assists per game	SPG	Steals per game
BPG	Blocks per game	PPG	Points per game	**Bold**	Career high

=== College ===
Year	Team	GP	GS	MPG	FG%	3P%	FT%	RPG	APG	SPG	BPG	PPG
2020–21	Kansas	30	2	16.0	**.482**	**.643**	.800	1.1	2.2	1.0	.1	2.4
2021–22	Kansas	**40**	**39**	29.0	.427	.323	.792	1.4	4.2	1.5	.3	5.4
2022–23	Kansas	36	36	34.2	.471	.405	.596	2.5	6.2	**2.2**	**.4**	8.9
2023–24	Kansas	34	34	**35.7**	.424	.384	**.804**	2.0	**6.5**	1.5	**.4**	8.5
2024–25	Kansas	33	33	32.4	.439	.321	.725	**3.0**	5.7	1.4	**.4**	**9.2**
Career		173	144	29.8	.444	.371	.729	2.0	5.0	1.5	.3	6.9

== See also ==
- List of NCAA Division I men's basketball career games played leaders
