= Ochai Agbaji =

American basketball player (born 2000)

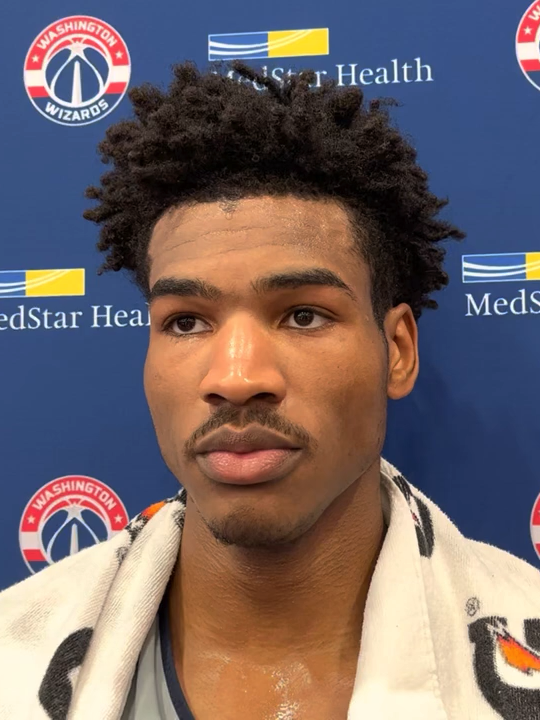
- Agbaji in 2022

No. 30 – Austin Spurs
- Position: Shooting guard / small forward
- League: NBA G League

Personal information
- Born: April 20, 2000 (age 26) Milwaukee, Wisconsin, U.S.
- Listed height: 6 ft 5 in (1.96 m)
- Listed weight: 215 lb (98 kg)

Career information
- High school: Oak Park (Kansas City, Missouri)
- College: Kansas (2018–2022)
- NBA draft: 2022: 1st round, 14th overall pick
- Drafted by: Cleveland Cavaliers
- Playing career: 2022–present

Career history
- 2022–2024: Utah Jazz
- 2022: →Salt Lake City Stars
- 2024–2026: Toronto Raptors
- 2026: Brooklyn Nets
- 2026–present: Austin Spurs

Career highlights
- NCAA champion (2022); NCAA Final Four Most Outstanding Player (2022); Consensus first-team All-American (2022); Big 12 Player of the Year (2022); First-team All-Big 12 (2022)
- Stats at NBA.com
- Stats at Basketball Reference

Ochai Young Agbaji (born April 20, 2000) is an American professional basketball player for the Austin Spurs of the NBA G League. As a senior at the University of Kansas, Agbaji was named a consensus first-team All-American and voted the Big 12 Player of the Year in 2022. He led the Jayhawks to a national championship and was named the Final Four Most Outstanding Player (MOP).

Agbaji was drafted as the 14th overall pick in the 2022 NBA draft by the Cleveland Cavaliers. However, he was traded to the Utah Jazz in September before playing a regular-season game in Cleveland. He was traded to the Toronto Raptors in 2024. He has also played for the Brooklyn Nets.

== Early life ==
Agbaji was born in Milwaukee, Wisconsin, but grew up mainly in Kansas City, Missouri. He grew up playing soccer, upon his father's encouragement, playing club soccer as well as Amateur Athletic Union (AAU) basketball from a young age. Agbaji stopped playing soccer as a sophomore at Oak Park High School in Kansas City, Missouri to focus on basketball. He grew nine inches (23 cm) between his freshman and junior years. In his basketball career at Oak Park, Agbaji did not receive offers from any Power Five college programs until his senior season. As a senior, he averaged 27.6 points and 8.6 rebounds per game for Oak Park and was named Kansas City Star All-Metro player of the year. Agbaji was considered a three-star recruit by 247Sports and Rivals. On February 8, 2018, he committed to play college basketball for Kansas over offers from Texas A&M and Wisconsin.

== College career ==
Agbaji began his freshman season at the University of Kansas as a redshirt and was a member of the scout team. In early January 2019, his redshirt was lifted because Kansas needed depth after Udoka Azubuike suffered a season-ending injury and Silvio De Sousa faced eligibility issues. On January 29, Agbaji made his first career start, scoring 24 points, bringing in seven rebounds, and stealing the ball twice in a loss to Texas. In his next game, he recorded his first double-double in a win over Texas Tech. Agbaji was named Big 12 Conference Newcomer of the Week for the two performances. Agbaji averaged 8.5 points and 4.6 rebounds per game in 22 games, including 16 starts as a freshman.

On November 5, 2019, Agbaji made his sophomore season debut, scoring 15 points in a loss to fourth-ranked Duke at the Champions Classic. During the aforementioned sophomore season, Agbaji was named Honorable Mention All-Big 12. As a sophomore, Agbaji averaged 10 points and 4.2 rebounds per game and finished second on the team with 46 three-pointers. He averaged 14.1 points per game as a junior, shooting 42 percent from the field. On April 8, 2021, he declared for the 2021 NBA draft while maintaining his college eligibility.

Agbaji made his senior season debut on November 9, 2021, recording 29 points in an 87–74 win against Michigan State at the Champions Classic. On January 24, 2022, he scored a career-high 37 points in a 94–91 double-overtime win over Texas Tech. At the close of the season, Agbaji was voted the Big 12 Player of the Year and was named a consensus first-team All-American. Kansas won the 2022 NCAA tournament, and he scored 12 points in the championship game and was named the tournament MOP. On April 24, Agbaji declared for the 2022 NBA draft.

== Professional career ==
=== Utah Jazz (2022–2024) ===
Agbaji was selected with the 14th overall pick in the 2022 NBA draft by the Cleveland Cavaliers. On July 2, 2022, Agbaji signed his rookie scale contract with the Cavaliers.

On September 1, 2022, Agbaji was traded, alongside Collin Sexton, Lauri Markkanen, three first-round picks and two pick swaps, to the Utah Jazz in exchange for Donovan Mitchell. Agbaji had his NBA debut on October 19, playing one minute in a 123–102 win over the Denver Nuggets. On April 8, 2023, Agbaji scored a career-high 28 points in a 118–114 win over the Nuggets.

=== Toronto Raptors (2024–2026) ===
On February 8, 2024, Agbaji was traded to the Toronto Raptors alongside Kelly Olynyk in exchange for Kira Lewis Jr., Otto Porter Jr., and a 2024 first-round draft pick, which became the 29th selection. He made 27 appearances (18 starts) for Toronto over the remainder of the season, averaging 6.7 points, 3.3 rebounds, and 1.3 assists.

On November 27, 2024, Agbaji scored a game-high 24 points on 9-of-10 shooting and made 6-of-7 three-pointers in a 119–93 win against the New Orleans Pelicans. He made 64 total appearances (including 45 starts) for Toronto during the 2024–25 NBA season, logging averages of 10.4 points, 3.8 rebounds, and 1.5 assists (all of which where career-highs).

Agbaji played in 42 games (making 13 starts) for the Raptors during the 2025–26 season, averaging 4.3 points, 2.3 rebounds, and 0.7 assists.

=== Brooklyn Nets (2026) ===
On February 5, 2026, Agbaji was traded to the Brooklyn Nets in a three-team trade involving the Los Angeles Clippers that sent Chris Paul to the Raptors.

On September 16, 2026, Agbaji signed with the New York Knicks. On October 15, 2026, the Knicks waived Agbaji.

On October 30, 2026, the Oklahoma City Thunder reportedly signed Agbaji to fill a roster spot after Jalen Williams and Cason Wallace suffered long term injuries. However the next day, ESPN insider Shams Charania reported that the Thunder were no longer signing Agbaji following an injury to star center Chet Holmgren.

=== Austin Spurs (2026–present) ===
On November 6, 2026, Agbaji was acquired by the Coachella Valley Lakers and traded to the Austin Spurs of the NBA G League. That same night, Agbaji made his debut with Austin, in which he recorded 29 points, 10 rebounds, and 3 assists in a 120-116 win against the Rio Grande Valley Vipers.

== Career statistics ==
Legend
GP	Games played	GS	Games started	MPG	Minutes per game
FG%	Field goal percentage	3P%	3-point field goal percentage	FT%	Free throw percentage
RPG	Rebounds per game	APG	Assists per game	SPG	Steals per game
BPG	Blocks per game	PPG	Points per game	**Bold**	Career high

=== NBA ===
Year	Team	GP	GS	MPG	FG%	3P%	FT%	RPG	APG	SPG	BPG	PPG
2022–23	Utah	59	22	20.5	.427	.355	.812	2.1	1.1	.3	.3	7.9
2023–24	Utah	51	10	19.7	.426	.331	.750	2.5	.9	.5	**.6**	5.4
2023–24	Toronto	27	18	23.6	.391	.217	.611	3.3	1.3	.7	**.6**	6.7
2024–25	Toronto	**64**	**45**	**27.2**	**.498**	**.399**	.708	**3.8**	**1.5**	**.9**	.5	**10.4**
2025–26	Toronto	42	13	15.5	.424	.185	**.862**	2.3	.7	.4	.3	4.3
2025–26	Brooklyn	20	0	16.2	.455	.349	.786	2.3	.9	.4	.3	6.7
Career		263	108	21.2	.448	.339	.755	2.7	1.1	.6	.4	7.2

=== College ===
Year	Team	GP	GS	MPG	FG%	3P%	FT%	RPG	APG	SPG	BPG	PPG
2018–19	Kansas	22	16	25.9	.449	.307	.694	4.6	.9	.5	.5	8.5
2019–20	Kansas	31	31	33.3	.428	.338	.673	4.2	**2.0**	**1.2**	.3	10.0
2020–21	Kansas	30	30	33.7	.420	.377	.689	3.7	1.9	1.1	.5	14.1
2021–22	Kansas	**39**	**39**	**35.1**	**.475**	**.409**	**.743**	**5.1**	1.6	.9	**.6**	**18.8**
Career		122	116	31.9	.443	.357	.699	4.4	1.6	.9	.4	12.8

== Personal life ==
Agbaji's father, Olofu, moved from Nigeria to the U.S. when he was 17. Agbaji's mother, Erica, and his father both played basketball at the University of Wisconsin–Milwaukee. His older sister, Orie, played volleyball for Texas.

On June 21, 2025, he married Avery. On June 22, 2025, the couple announced they were having a baby girl.
