= Cody Riley =

American basketball player

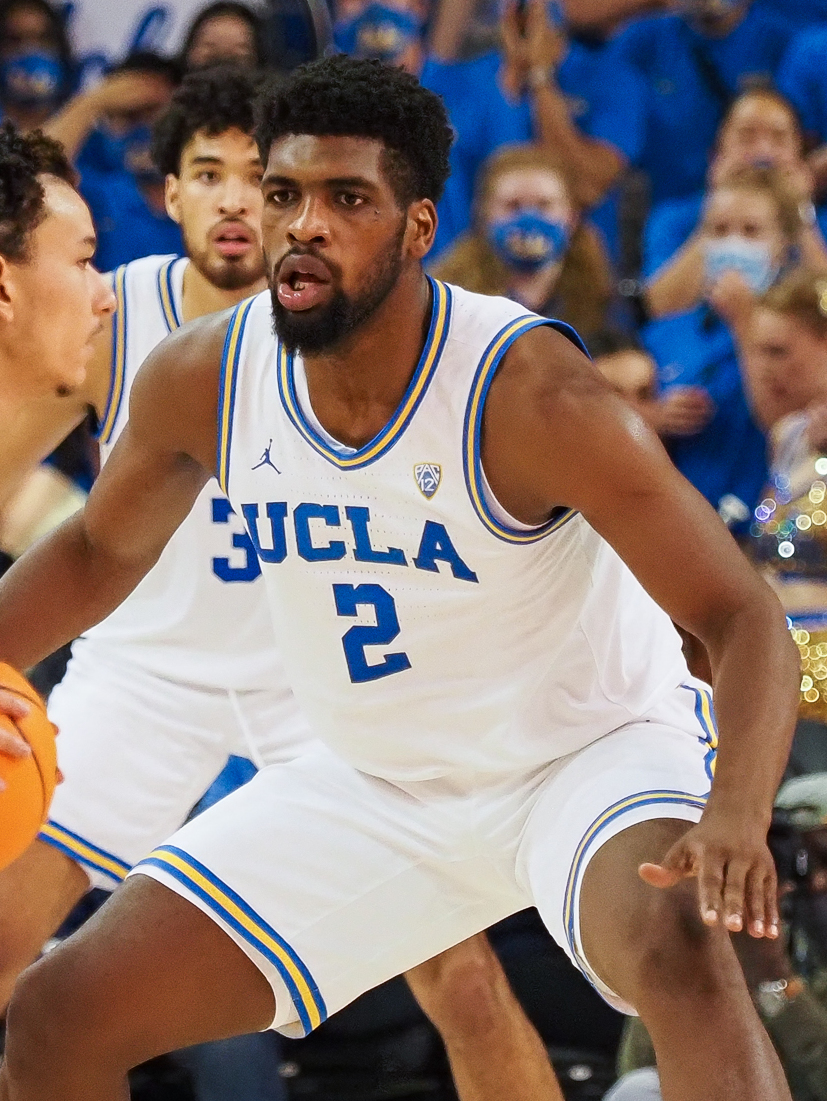
- Riley with UCLA in 2021

No. 2 – Maccabi Petah TikvaElitzur
- Position: Power forward
- League: Liga Leumit

Personal information
- Born: December 12, 1997 (age 28) Kansas City, Kansas, U.S.
- Listed height: 6 ft 9 in (2.06 m)
- Listed weight: 250 lb (113 kg)

Career information
- High school: Sierra Canyon (Chatsworth, California)
- College: UCLA (2018–2022)
- NBA draft: 2022: undrafted
- Playing career: 2022–present

Career history
- 2022–2023: KK Rogaška
- 2023: Basket Brno
- 2023: Maccabi Rishon Le-Zion
- 2023: Maccabi Haifa B.C.
- 2023–2024: Leuven Bears
- 2024–2025: Elitzur Netanya B.C.
- 2025–present: Maccabi Petah TikvaElitzur

Cody Jorden Riley (born December 12, 1997) is an American professional basketball player for Maccabi Petah TikvaElitzur of the Liga Leumit. He played college basketball for the UCLA Bruins.

== High school career ==
Riley attended Sierra Canyon School in Chatsworth, California. He averaged 14.5 points and 7.7 rebounds per game as a freshman for a team that finished 29–4. Riley was named MaxPreps Freshman of the Year. As a sophomore, he averaged 15.6 points and 9.4 rebounds per game and led the team to a 26–4 record and the California Division V title. Riley was named a sophomore All-American by MaxPreps. He averaged 12.5 points and 7.9 rebounds per game for the Trailblazers as a junior, leading the team to the CIF Southern Section Open Division final before losing to state champion Chino Hills High School. Riley earned First Team All-Area honors from the Los Angeles Daily News and Third Team All-State according to Cal-Hi Sports. In the summer of 2016, he averaged 13.7 points and 7.3 rebounds per game in the Nike Elite Youth Basketball League, playing alongside Marvin Bagley III.

As a senior at Sierra Canyon, Riley averaged 16.3 points and 8.3 rebounds per game. He was the No. 45 overall recruit in his class according to ESPN and a four-star prospect. In October 2016, Riley committed to playing college basketball for UCLA over offers from Kansas, USC, UConn and Oklahoma.

== College career ==
Prior to the start of his freshman season, Riley was one of three UCLA players (along with Jalen Hill and LiAngelo Ball) who were arrested in China for allegedly shoplifting before their game against Georgia Tech. The arrested players were confined to their hotel for several days until the charges were dropped and the players were allowed to leave the country. Riley and the other two players were suspended indefinitely from the team after their return to campus, and on December 22, 2017, UCLA announced that Riley and Hill would remain suspended for the entire season, but were allowed to join practices and team activities on December 26. Riley declared for the 2018 NBA draft, but opted to withdraw and continue his college career at UCLA.

Riley averaged 5.5 points, 4.1 rebounds and 0.4 blocks per game as a redshirt freshman. As a sophomore, he averaged 8.8 points and 4.5 rebounds per game. On January 8, 2021, Riley scored a career-high 22 points to go with 13 rebounds in an 81–75 overtime win against Arizona State. He averaged 10 points and 5.4 rebounds per game as a junior, shooting 53.8% from the field and helping the Bruins reach the Final Four. Following the season, Riley declared for the 2021 NBA draft, but ultimately returned to UCLA. In the 2021–22 season opener against Cal State Bakersfield, he sustained a left medial collateral ligament sprain after a collision in the first half. He was sidelined for almost two months before returning in January 2022. In his second game back, he had a career-high four steals in a win over California. He decided not to return for a sixth season, forgoing his remaining season of eligibility.

== Professional career ==
=== Rogaska Crystal (2022–2023) ===
After going undrafted in the 2022 NBA draft, Riley signed with KK Rogaška of the Premier A Slovenian Basketball League.

=== Basket Brno (2023) ===
In January 2023, Riley signed with Basket Brno of the National Basketball League. He played in 3 games and averaged 14 points, 8 rebounds and 1.3 blocks per game.

=== Maccabi Effie Capital Rishon Le-Zion (2023) ===
In February 2023, Riley signed with Maccabi Rishon Le-Zion. He played in 11 games and averaged 15.1 points and 8.7 rebounds.

=== Next Urban Maccabi Haifa (2023) ===
On July 29, 2023, Riley signed with Maccabi Haifa B.C. for the season. He joined Nick Hornsby who was already on the roster.

=== Stella Artois Leuven Bears (2023–2024) ===
On November 6, 2023, Riley signed with Leuven Bears. He played in 13 games and averaged 15.5 points, 10.8 rebounds and 3.1 assists.

=== Elitzur Maccabi Netanya (2024–2025) ===
On September 20, 2024, Riley signed with Elitzur Netanya B.C.

=== Maccabi Petah TikvaElitzur (2025–present) ===
On September 22, 2025, Riley signed with Maccabi Petah TikvaElitzur of the Liga Leumit.

== Career statistics ==
Legend
GP	Games played	GS	Games started	MPG	Minutes per game
FG%	Field goal percentage	3P%	3-point field goal percentage	FT%	Free throw percentage
RPG	Rebounds per game	APG	Assists per game	SPG	Steals per game
BPG	Blocks per game	PPG	Points per game	**Bold**	Career high

=== College ===
Year	Team	GP	GS	MPG	FG%	3P%	FT%	RPG	APG	SPG	BPG	PPG
2017–18	UCLA	Redshirt										
2018–19	UCLA	30	8	17.5	.474	.300	.523	4.1	.7	.3	.4	5.5
2019–20	UCLA	**31**	17	20.4	.518	.000	.548	4.5	.8	.4	.5	8.8
2020–21	UCLA	**31**	**31**	**23.3**	**.538**	.000	.663	**5.4**	**1.3**	.4	**.7**	**10.0**
2021–22	UCLA	26	20	21.6	.464	**.500**	**.672**	3.9	1.0	**.7**	.4	7.3
Career		118	76	20.7	.505	.286	.606	4.5	.9	.4	.5	7.9
