= Remy Martin (basketball) =

American basketball player (born 1998)

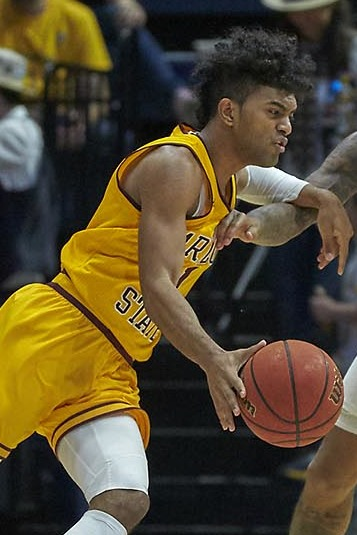
- Martin with Arizona State in 2020

No. 9 – Windy City Bulls
- Position: Point guard
- League: NBA G League

Personal information
- Born: June 16, 1998 (age 28)
- Listed height: 6 ft 0 in (1.83 m)
- Listed weight: 175 lb (79 kg)

Career information
- High school: Sierra Canyon (Chatsworth, California)
- College: Arizona State (2017–2021); Kansas (2021–2022)
- NBA draft: 2022: undrafted
- Playing career: 2022–present

Career history
- 2022–2023: Lavrio
- 2023–2024, 2026: Keflavík
- 2026–present: Windy City Bulls

Career highlights
- Icelandic Cup (2024); Úrvalsdeild karla scoring leader (2024); NCAA champion (2022); 2× First-team All-Pac-12 (2020, 2021); Second-team All-Pac-12 (2019); Pac-12 Sixth Man of the Year (2018)

Remy Macaspac Martin (born June 16, 1998) is a Filipino-American professional basketball player for the Windy City Bulls of the NBA G League. He played college basketball for the Arizona State Sun Devils and the Kansas Jayhawks, where he was a part of the Jayhawks 2022 National Championship Team.

In 2024, he won the Icelandic Basketball Cup as a member of Keflavík.

== College career ==
=== Arizona State (2017–2021) ===
After attending Sierra Canyon School, Martin committed to Arizona State. As a freshman, Martin averaged 9.6 points, 3.0 rebounds, and 2.9 assists per game and earned Sixth-Man of the Year honors in the Pac-12. He scored 21 points in an upset of Kansas. As a sophomore, Martin struggled with injuries which forced him to miss a few games but still averaged 12.9 points, 5.0 assists and 3.2 rebounds per game. He was named second-team All-Pac-12.

Martin had a career-high 31 points to go with eight assists in a 95–88 overtime win over Arizona on January 31, 2019. At the conclusion of the regular season, Martin was named first-team All-Pac-12. He averaged 19.1 points (second in conference), 4.1 assists and 3.1 rebounds per game as a junior, and he led the Pac-12 with a 2.4 assist-to-turnover ratio. Following the season, Martin declared for the 2020 NBA draft. On August 2, he announced he was withdrawing from the draft and returning for his senior season. On April 6, 2021, he declared for the 2021 NBA draft. He maintained his college eligibility and entered the transfer portal.

=== Kansas (2021–2022) ===
Martin announced his commitment to Kansas on May 17, 2021. He was ranked as one of the top-3 transfer players heading into the season. In their 2021-22 season opener, he scored 15 points on 5-of-9 shooting against Michigan State. On December 29, 2021, he suffered a right knee injury. That injury kept him ineffective throughout January and caused him to miss seven games in February. He was able to return for the final game of the month, which was a loss to Baylor. He then had 12 points and a season-high three steals in the Big-12 tournament championship game victory over Texas Tech. In the opening round of the NCAA Tournament, he had 15 points, four assists, and two steals against Texas Southern. He then went on to have 20 points and 7 rebounds against Creighton the next round, and 23 points in the Sweet 16 against Providence. After Kansas beat Miami to move on to the Final Four, he was named Most Outstanding Player of the Midwest regional. In the national championship game he only scored three points in the first half, but had 11 crucial points after the half, helping Kansas beat North Carolina for its fourth national championship. He is the third Filipino-American basketball player to win a national championship, after Raymond Townsend with UCLA in 1975, and Kihei Clark with Virginia in 2019.

=== Strong Group Athletics ===
Martin joined non-league team Strong Group Athletics for the 2026 William Jones Cup in Taiwan.

== Professional career ==
After going undrafted in the 2022 NBA draft, Martin was drafted 40th overall by the Cleveland Charge in the NBA G League. He was drafted with a second-round pick from a previous trade. On October 24, 2022, Martin joined the training camp roster. However, he did not make the final roster.

On November 11, 2022, Martin signed with Lavrio of the Greek Basket League. In 12 league games, he averaged 6 points, 1.2 rebounds and 1.4 assists, playing around 13 minutes per contest.

In July 2023, Martin signed with Keflavík of the Icelandic Úrvalsdeild karla. On October 19, he scored a game-winning three pointer with two seconds left against Valur. On 23 March 2024, he won the Icelandic Basketball Cup with Keflavík, scoring a game high 23 points in the Cup final. During the playoffs, Martin suffered an achilles injury and missed the rest of the season.

Following the recovery of his injuries, he re-signed with Keflavík for the second half of the 2025–2026 season.

== National team ==
Martin considers the prospect of playing for the Philippine national team as bigger than playing in the NBA. While he holds Philippine citizenship, Martin is a restricted player under FIBA eligibility rules, having been unable to secure a Philippine passport by age 16.

== Career statistics ==
Legend
GP	Games played	GS	Games started	MPG	Minutes per game
FG%	Field goal percentage	3P%	3-point field goal percentage	FT%	Free throw percentage
RPG	Rebounds per game	APG	Assists per game	SPG	Steals per game
BPG	Blocks per game	PPG	Points per game	**Bold**	Career high

=== College ===
Year	Team	GP	GS	MPG	FG%	3P%	FT%	RPG	APG	SPG	BPG	PPG
2017–18	Arizona State	**32**	1	23.8	.453	**.371**	.755	3.0	2.9	1.1	**.1**	9.6
2018–19	Arizona State	**32**	28	32.6	.402	.312	.736	**3.2**	**5.0**	1.3	.0	12.9
2019–20	Arizona State	31	**31**	**33.8**	.432	.335	.772	3.1	4.1	**1.5**	.0	**19.1**
2020–21	Arizona State	23	23	33.5	.433	.346	**.776**	2.8	3.7	1.2	.0	**19.1**
2021–22	Kansas	29	13	21.2	**.458**	.357	.754	3.0	2.6	.6	**.1**	8.4
Career		147	95	28.8	.432	.338	.761	3.0	3.7	1.1	.1	13.6

== Personal life ==
Martin's father is African-American and his mother is Filipino. He holds dual citizenship with the United States and the Philippines.
