= 2022 NCAA Division I men's basketball tournament =

Edition of USA college basketball tournament

- Season: 2021–22
- Teams: 68
- Finals site: Caesars Superdome, New Orleans, Louisiana
- Champions: Kansas Jayhawks (4th title, 10th title game, 16th Final Four)
- Runner-up: North Carolina Tar Heels (12th title game, 21st Final Four)
- Semifinalists: Duke Blue Devils (17th Final Four); Villanova Wildcats (7th Final Four)
- Winning coach: Bill Self (2nd title)
- MOP: Ochai Agbaji (Kansas)
- Attendance: 684,425
- Top scorer: Caleb Love; Brady Manek (North Carolina) (113 points)

The 2022 NCAA Division I men's basketball tournament involved 68 teams playing in a single-elimination tournament that determined the National Collegiate Athletic Association (NCAA) Division I men's college basketball national champion for the 2021–22 season. The 83rd annual edition of the tournament began on March 15, 2022, and concluded with the championship game on April 4 at the Caesars Superdome in New Orleans, Louisiana, with the Kansas Jayhawks defeating the North Carolina Tar Heels, 72–69, overcoming a 16-point first-half deficit (the largest deficit overcome in championship game history), to claim the school's fourth national title.

Big South Conference champion Longwood and Northeast Conference (NEC) champion Bryant made their tournament debuts. Bryant was eliminated in the First Four by Wright State, and Longwood was eliminated by Tennessee in the first round.

A major upset occurred on the first full day of the tournament, when 15-seed Saint Peter's upset 2-seed Kentucky, and subsequently became the third 15-seed to reach the Sweet 16 (the second consecutive year in which this occurred and third in the last nine years) and the first ever 15-seed to advance to the Elite Eight. This was the tenth time a 15-seed defeated a 2-seed overall, but it was the sixth time since 2012 this occurred. The defending champions Baylor were defeated by North Carolina in the second round, ensuring the defending champion and at least one top seed was eliminated before the regional semifinals for the fifth consecutive tournament, and at least one double-digit seed (this year, four: 15-seed Saint Peter's, 11-seeds Michigan and Iowa State, and 10-seed Miami) made the Sweet 16 for the 14th straight tournament.

== Tournament procedure ==
A total of 68 teams were entered into the 2022 tournament. A total of 32 automatic bids were awarded to each program that won a conference tournament (with one exception, as the tournament winner in the ASUN Conference was ineligible, due to its transition from Division II). The remaining 36 bids were issued "at-large", with selections extended by the NCAA Selection Committee. The Selection Committee also seeded the entire field from 1 to 68.

Eight teams (the four lowest-seeded automatic qualifiers and the four lowest-seeded at-large teams) played in the First Four. The winners of these games advanced to the main bracket of the tournament.

The top four teams outside of the ranking (commonly known as the "first four out" in pre-tournament analyses) acted as standbys in the event a school was forced to withdraw before the start of the tournament due to COVID-19 protocols. Any recipient of an automatic bid would designate a replacement from within their own conference if they need to withdraw. Otherwise, the replacement teams were as follows, in order:

First Four Out
NET	School	Conference	Record
58	Dayton	Atlantic 10	23–10
40	Oklahoma	Big 12	18–15
44	SMU	American	23–8
42	Texas A&M	SEC	23–12

Once the tournament started, any team that would have been forced to withdraw would not be replaced; the bracket would not be reseeded, and the affected team's opponent would automatically advance to the next round.

== Schedule and venues ==
2022 First Four (orange) and first and second rounds (green)
2022 Regionals (blue) and Final Four (red)

After the 2020 tournament was cancelled and the 2021 tournament was held in a single location due to the COVID-19 pandemic, it was reverted to the standard format for the first time since 2019.

The sites selected to host each round of the 2022 tournament were:

First Four

- March 15 and 16
  - University of Dayton Arena, Dayton, Ohio (Host: University of Dayton)

First and second rounds (Subregionals)

- March 17 and 19
    - Dickies Arena, Fort Worth, Texas (Host: Texas Christian University)
    - Gainbridge Fieldhouse, Indianapolis, Indiana (Hosts: IUPUI, Horizon League)
    - KeyBank Center, Buffalo, New York (Hosts: Canisius College, Niagara University, Metro Atlantic Athletic Conference)
    - Moda Center, Portland, Oregon (Host: Oregon State University)
- March 18 and 20
    - Bon Secours Wellness Arena, Greenville, South Carolina (Hosts: Furman University, Southern Conference)
    - Fiserv Forum, Milwaukee, Wisconsin (Host: Marquette University)
    - PPG Paints Arena, Pittsburgh, Pennsylvania (Host: Duquesne University)
    - Viejas Arena, San Diego, California (Host: San Diego State University)

Regional semifinals and finals (Sweet Sixteen and Elite Eight)

- March 24 and 26
  - West Regional, Chase Center, San Francisco, California (Host: Pac 12 Conference)
  - South Regional, AT&T Center, San Antonio, Texas (Host: University of Texas at San Antonio)
- March 25 and 27
  - East Regional, Wells Fargo Center, Philadelphia, Pennsylvania (Host: University of Pennsylvania)
  - Midwest Regional, United Center, Chicago, Illinois (Host: Northwestern University)

National semifinals and championship (Final Four and Championship)

- April 2 and 4
  - Caesars Superdome, New Orleans, Louisiana (Hosts: Tulane University, University of New Orleans)

New Orleans hosted the Final Four for the sixth time, having previously hosted in 2012.

== Qualification and selection of teams ==
=== Automatic qualifiers ===
Conference	Team	Appearance	Last bid
America East	Vermont	8th	2019
American	Houston	23rd	2021
Atlantic 10	Richmond	10th	2011
ACC	Virginia Tech	13th	2021
ASUN	Jacksonville State (Note: Jacksonville State, the ASUN regular-season champion, was awarded the ASUN's NCAA tournament bid because Bellarmine, which won the conference tournament, is ineligible due to a transition from Division II.)	2nd	2017
Big 12	Kansas	50th	2021
Big East	Villanova	41st	2021
Big Sky	Montana State	4th	1996
Big South	Longwood	1st	Never
Big Ten	Iowa	28th	2021
Big West	Cal State Fullerton	4th	2018
CAA	Delaware	6th	2014
C-USA	UAB	16th	2015
Horizon	Wright State	4th	2018
Ivy League	Yale	6th	2019
MAAC	Saint Peter's	4th	2011
MAC	Akron	5th	2013
MEAC	Norfolk State	3rd	2021
Missouri Valley	Loyola Chicago	8th	2021
Mountain West	Boise State	8th	2015
NEC	Bryant	1st	Never
Ohio Valley	Murray State	18th	2019
Pac-12	Arizona	36th	2018
Patriot	Colgate	5th	2021
SEC	Tennessee	23rd	2021
Southern	Chattanooga	12th	2016
Southland	Texas A&M–Corpus Christi	2nd	2007
SWAC	Texas Southern	10th	2021
Summit League	South Dakota State	6th	2018
Sun Belt	Georgia State	6th	2019
WCC	Gonzaga	24th	2021
WAC	New Mexico State	26th	2019

=== Tournament seeds ===
The tournament seeds and regions were determined through the NCAA basketball tournament selection process and were published by the selection committee after the brackets were released. This was the fifth consecutive tournament in which at least one of the four #1 seeds repeated their #1 seeding from the year before.

West Regional – Chase Center, San Francisco, California
Seed	School	Conference	Record	Overall Seed	Berth type	Last bid
1	Gonzaga	West Coast	26–3	1	Automatic	2021
2	Duke	ACC	28–6	8	At-Large	2019
3	Texas Tech	Big 12	25–9	12	At-Large	2021
4	Arkansas	SEC	25–8	16	At-Large	2021
5	UConn	Big East	23–9	17	At-Large	2021
6	Alabama	SEC	19–13	21	At-Large	2021
7	Michigan State	Big Ten	22–12	27	At-Large	2021
8	Boise State	Mountain West	27–7	29	Automatic	2015
9	Memphis	American	21–10	36	At-Large	2014
10	Davidson	Atlantic 10	27–6	40	At-Large	2018
11*	Rutgers	Big Ten	18–13	44	At-Large	2021
11*	Notre Dame	ACC	22–10	45	At-Large	2017
12	New Mexico State	WAC	26–6	50	Automatic	2019
13	Vermont	America East	28–5	53	Automatic	2019
14	Montana State	Big Sky	27–7	58	Automatic	1996
15	Cal State Fullerton	Big West	21–10	62	Automatic	2018
16	Georgia State	Sun Belt	18–10	63	Automatic	2019

South Regional – AT&T Center, San Antonio, Texas
Seed	School	Conference	Record	Overall Seed	Berth type	Last bid
1	Arizona	Pac–12	31–3	2	Automatic	2018
2	Villanova	Big East	26–7	7	Automatic	2021
3	Tennessee	SEC	26–7	10	Automatic	2021
4	Illinois	Big Ten	22–9	14	At-Large	2021
5	Houston	American	29–5	18	Automatic	2021
6	Colorado State	Mountain West	25–5	24	At-Large	2013
7	Ohio State	Big Ten	19–11	28	At-Large	2021
8	Seton Hall	Big East	21–10	32	At-Large	2019
9	TCU	Big 12	20–12	34	At-Large	2018
10	Loyola Chicago	Missouri Valley	25–7	39	Automatic	2021
11	Michigan	Big Ten	17–14	42	At-Large	2021
12	UAB	C-USA	27–7	48	Automatic	2015
13	Chattanooga	Southern	27–7	51	Automatic	2016
14	Longwood	Big South	26–6	55	Automatic	Never
15	Delaware	Colonial	22–12	59	Automatic	2014
16*	Wright State	Horizon	21–13	65	Automatic	2018
16*	Bryant	Northeast	22–9	66	Automatic	Never

East Regional – Wells Fargo Center, Philadelphia, Pennsylvania
Seed	School	Conference	Record	Overall Seed	Berth type	Last bid
1	Baylor	Big 12	26–6	4	At-Large	2021
2	Kentucky	SEC	26–7	6	At-Large	2019
3	Purdue	Big Ten	27–7	11	At-Large	2021
4	UCLA	Pac–12	25–7	13	At-Large	2021
5	Saint Mary's	West Coast	25–7	19	At-Large	2019
6	Texas	Big 12	21–11	23	At-Large	2021
7	Murray State	Ohio Valley	30–2	26	Automatic	2019
8	North Carolina	ACC	24–9	30	At-Large	2021
9	Marquette	Big East	19–12	35	At-Large	2019
10	San Francisco	West Coast	24–9	37	At-Large	1998
11	Virginia Tech	ACC	23–12	43	Automatic	2021
12*	Wyoming	Mountain West	25–8	46	At-Large	2015
12*	Indiana	Big Ten	20–13	47	At-Large	2016
13	Akron	MAC	24–9	54	Automatic	2013
14	Yale	Ivy	19–11	56	Automatic	2019
15	Saint Peter's	MAAC	19–11	60	Automatic	2011
16	Norfolk State	MEAC	24–6	64	Automatic	2021

Midwest Regional – United Center, Chicago, Illinois
Seed	School	Conference	Record	Overall Seed	Berth type	Last bid
1	Kansas	Big 12	28–6	3	Automatic	2021
2	Auburn	SEC	27–5	5	At-Large	2019
3	Wisconsin	Big Ten	24–7	9	At-Large	2021
4	Providence	Big East	25–5	15	At-Large	2018
5	Iowa	Big Ten	26–9	20	Automatic	2021
6	LSU	SEC	22–11	22	At-Large	2021
7	USC	Pac–12	26–7	25	At-Large	2021
8	San Diego State	Mountain West	23–8	31	At-Large	2021
9	Creighton	Big East	22–11	33	At-Large	2021
10	Miami (FL)	ACC	23–10	38	At-Large	2018
11	Iowa State	Big 12	20–12	41	At-Large	2019
12	Richmond	Atlantic 10	23–12	49	Automatic	2011
13	South Dakota State	Summit	30–4	52	Automatic	2018
14	Colgate	Patriot	23–11	57	Automatic	2021
15	Jacksonville State	ASUN	21–10	61	Automatic	2017
16*	Texas Southern	SWAC	18–12	67	Automatic	2021
16*	Texas A&M–Corpus Christi	Southland	23–11	68	Automatic	2007

*See First Four

== Tournament bracket ==
All times are listed in Eastern Daylight Time (UTC−4)

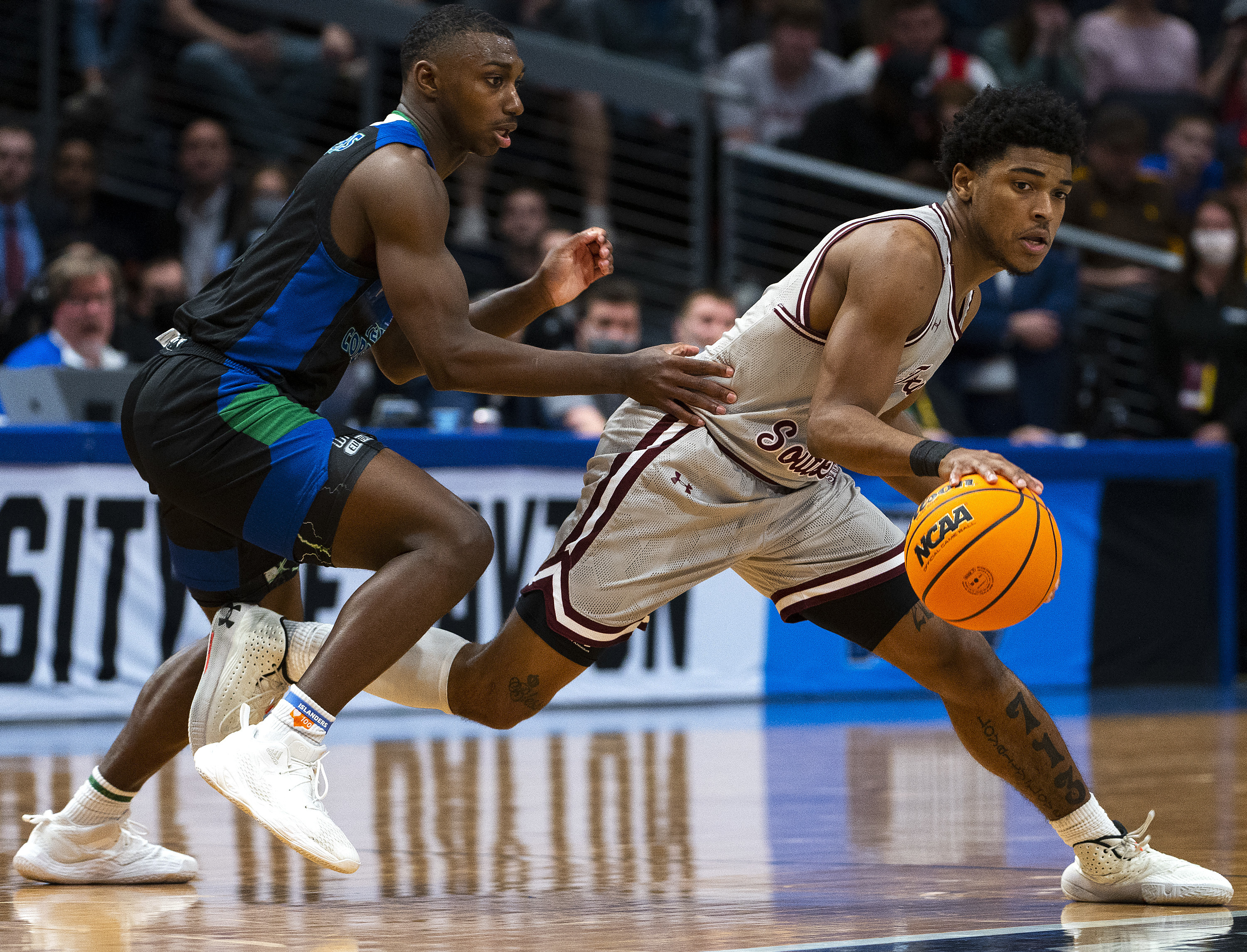
The first game of the tournament – a First Four matchup featuring Texas Southern vs. Texas A&M-Corpus Christi

=== First Four – Dayton, OH ===
The First Four games involve eight teams: the four overall lowest-ranked teams and the four lowest-ranked at-large teams.

March 15 – Midwest Region
16	Texas Southern	76
16	Texas A&M–Corpus Christi	67

March 15 – East Region
12	Wyoming	58
12	Indiana	66

March 16 – South Region
16	Wright State	93
16	Bryant	82

March 16 – West Region
11	Rutgers	87
11	Notre Dame	89^{2OT}

=== West Regional – San Francisco, CA ===
First round Round of 64; March 17–18
1	Gonzaga	93
16	Georgia State	72
Portland – Thu/Sat
8	Boise State	53
9	Memphis	64
5	UConn	63
12	New Mexico State	70
Buffalo – Thu/Sat
4	Arkansas	75
13	Vermont	71
6	Alabama	64
11	Notre Dame	78
San Diego – Fri/Sun
3	Texas Tech	97
14	Montana State	62
7	Michigan State	74
10	Davidson	73
Greenville – Fri/Sun
2	Duke	78
15	Cal State Fullerton	61

Second Round; Round of 32; March 19–20
1	Gonzaga	82
9	Memphis	78
12	New Mexico State	48
4	Arkansas	53
11	Notre Dame	53
3	Texas Tech	59
7	Michigan State	76
2	Duke	85

Regional semifinals Sweet 16; March 24
1	Gonzaga	68
4	Arkansas	74
3	Texas Tech	73
2	Duke	78

Regional Final; Elite 8 March 26
4	Arkansas	69
2	Duke	78

==== West Regional Final ====
TBS

March 26
5:49 pm PDT

#4 Arkansas Razorbacks 69, #2 Duke Blue Devils 78
Scoring by half: 33–45, 36–33
Pts: Jaylin Williams, 19; Rebs: Jaylin Williams, 10; Asts: JD Notae, 4	Pts: AJ Griffin, 18; Rebs: Mark Williams, 12; Asts: Paolo Banchero, 3

Chase Center – San Francisco, California
Attendance: 17,739
Referees: Ron Groover, Joe Lindsay, Larry Scirotto

==== West Regional all-tournament team ====
- JD Notae – Arkansas
- Jaylin Williams – Arkansas
- Mark Williams – Duke
- Jeremy Roach – Duke
- Paolo Banchero – Duke (MOP)

=== East Regional – Philadelphia, PA ===
First round Round of 64; March 17–18
1	Baylor	85
16	Norfolk State	49
Fort Worth – Thu/Sat
8	North Carolina	95
9	Marquette	63
5	Saint Mary's	82
12	Indiana	53
Portland – Thu/Sat
4	UCLA	57
13	Akron	53
6	Texas	81
11	Virginia Tech	73
Milwaukee – Fri/Sun
3	Purdue	78
14	Yale	56
7	Murray State	92^{OT}
10	San Francisco	87
Indianapolis – Thu/Sat
2	Kentucky	79
15	Saint Peter's	85^{OT}

Second Round; Round of 32; March 19–20
1	Baylor	86
8	North Carolina	93^{OT}
5	Saint Mary's	56
4	UCLA	72
6	Texas	71
3	Purdue	81
7	Murray State	60
15	Saint Peter's	70

Regional semifinals Sweet 16; March 25
8	North Carolina	73
4	UCLA	66
3	Purdue	64
15	Saint Peter's	67

Regional Final; Elite 8 March 27
8	North Carolina	69
15	Saint Peter's	49

==== East Regional Final ====
CBS

March 27
5:05 pm EDT

#15 Saint Peter's Peacocks 49, #8 North Carolina Tar Heels 69
Scoring by half: 19–38, 30–31
Pts: Fousseyni Drame, 12; Rebs: 2 tied, 7 Asts: KC Ndefo, 3	Pts: Armando Bacot, 20; Rebs: Armando Bacot, 22; Asts: 2 tied, 4

Wells Fargo Center – Philadelphia, Pennsylvania
Referees: Verne Harris, John Higgins, Bo Boroski

==== East Regional all-tournament team ====
- Armando Bacot, North Carolina (MOP)
- Daryl Banks III, Saint Peter's
- Doug Edert, Saint Peter's
- Caleb Love, North Carolina
- Brady Manek, North Carolina

=== South Regional – San Antonio, TX ===
First round Round of 64; March 17–18
1	Arizona	87
16	Wright State	70
San Diego – Fri/Sun
8	Seton Hall	42
9	TCU	69
5	Houston	82
12	UAB	68
Pittsburgh – Fri/Sun
4	Illinois	54
13	Chattanooga	53
6	Colorado State	63
11	Michigan	75
Indianapolis – Thu/Sat
3	Tennessee	88
14	Longwood	56
7	Ohio State	54
10	Loyola Chicago	41
Pittsburgh – Fri/Sun
2	Villanova	80
15	Delaware	60

Second Round; Round of 32; March 19–20
1	Arizona	85^{OT}
9	TCU	80
5	Houston	68
4	Illinois	53
11	Michigan	76
3	Tennessee	68
7	Ohio State	61
2	Villanova	71

Regional semifinals Sweet 16; March 24
1	Arizona	60
5	Houston	72
11	Michigan	55
2	Villanova	63

Regional Final; Elite 8 March 26
5	Houston	44
2	Villanova	50

==== South Regional Final ====
TBS

March 26
5:09 pm CDT

#5 Houston Cougars 44, #2 Villanova Wildcats 50
Scoring by half: 20–27, 24–23
Pts: Taze Moore, 15; Rebs: Taze Moore, 10; Asts: Kyler Edwards, 4	Pts: Jermaine Samuels, 16; Rebs: Jermaine Samuels, 10; Asts: 2 tied, 2

AT&T Center – San Antonio, Texas
Attendance: 17,186
Referees: Jeff Anderson, Kipp Kissinger, Mike Reed

==== South Regional all tournament team ====
- Jermaine Samuels – Villanova (MOP)
- Collin Gillespie – Villanova
- Caleb Daniels – Villanova
- Justin Moore – Villanova
- Jamal Shead – Houston

=== Midwest Regional – Chicago, IL ===
First round Round of 64; March 17–18
1	Kansas	83
16	Texas Southern	56
Fort Worth – Thu/Sat
8	San Diego State	69
9	Creighton	72^{OT}
5	Iowa	63
12	Richmond	67
Buffalo – Thu/Sat
4	Providence	66
13	South Dakota State	57
6	LSU	54
11	Iowa State	59
Milwaukee – Fri/Sun
3	Wisconsin	67
14	Colgate	60
7	USC	66
10	Miami (FL)	68
Greenville – Fri/Sun
2	Auburn	80
15	Jacksonville State	61

Second Round; Round of 32; March 19–20
1	Kansas	79
9	Creighton	72
12	Richmond	51
4	Providence	79
11	Iowa State	54
3	Wisconsin	49
10	Miami (FL)	79
2	Auburn	61

Regional semifinals Sweet 16; March 25
1	Kansas	66
4	Providence	61
11	Iowa State	56
10	Miami (FL)	70

Regional Final; Elite 8 March 27
1	Kansas	76
10	Miami (FL)	50

==== Midwest Regional Final ====
CBS

March 27
1:20 pm CDT

#10 Miami Hurricanes 50, #1 Kansas Jayhawks 76
Scoring by half: 35–29, 15–47
Pts: Kameron McGusty, 18; Rebs: Anthony Walker, 5 Asts: Isaiah Wong, 3	Pts: Ochai Agbaji, 18; Rebs: Jalen Wilson, 11; Asts: 3 tied, 4

United Center – Chicago, Illinois
Referees: Roger Ayers, Terry Wymer, Earl Walton

==== Midwest Regional all-tournament team ====
- Al Durham, Providence
- Kameron McGusty, Miami
- Christian Braun, Kansas
- David McCormack, Kansas
- Remy Martin, Kansas (MOP)

=== Final Four – New Orleans, Louisiana ===
National semifinals Saturday, April 2
W2	Duke	77
E8	North Carolina	81
S2	Villanova	65
MW1	Kansas	81

National championship game Monday, April 4
E8	North Carolina	69
MW1	Kansas	72

==== National semifinals ====
TBS

April 2
5:09 pm CDT

Preview

S2 Villanova Wildcats 65, M1 Kansas Jayhawks 81
Scoring by half: 29–40, 36–41
Pts: Collin Gillespie, 19; Rebs: 3 tied, 7 Asts: 3 tied, 3	Pts: David McCormack, 25; Rebs: Jalen Wilson, 11; Asts: 2 tied, 5

Caesars Superdome – New Orleans, Louisiana
Attendance: 70,602
Referees: Doug Sirmons, Keith Kimble, James Breeding

Related article: Carolina–Duke rivalry

TBS

April 2
7:49 pm CDT

Preview

E8 North Carolina Tar Heels 81, W2 Duke Blue Devils 77
Scoring by half: 34–37, 47–40
Pts: Caleb Love, 28; Rebs: Armando Bacot, 21; Asts: RJ Davis, 4	Pts: Paolo Banchero, 20; Rebs: Paolo Banchero, 10; Asts: Jeremy Roach, 5

Caesars Superdome – New Orleans, Louisiana
Attendance: 70,602
Referees: Roger Ayers, Tony Padilla, Bo Boroski

==== National championship ====
TBS

April 4
8:20 pm CDT

Preview

E8 North Carolina Tar Heels 69, M1 Kansas Jayhawks 72
Scoring by half: 40–25, 29–47
Pts: A. Bacot, R. J. Davis – 15; Rebs: A. Bacot – 15; Asts: Four tied – 2	Pts: J. Wilson, D. McCormack – 15; Rebs: C. Braun – 12; Asts: D. Harris, C. Braun – 3

Caesars Superdome – New Orleans, Louisiana
Attendance: 69,423
Referees: Ron Groover, Jeff Anderson, Terry Oglesby

==== Final Four all-tournament team ====
- Ochai Agbaji, Kansas (MOP)
- David McCormack, Kansas
- Armando Bacot, North Carolina
- Caleb Love, North Carolina
- Paolo Banchero, Duke

== Game summaries and tournament notes ==
=== Upsets ===
Per the NCAA, "Upsets are defined as when the winner of the game was seeded five or more places lower than the team it defeated."

The 2022 tournament saw a total of 13 upsets, with six in the first round, five in the second round, one in the Sweet Sixteen, and one in the Final Four.

Upsets in the 2022 NCAA Division I men's basketball tournament
Round	West	Midwest	South	East
Round of 64	No. 12 New Mexico State defeated No. 5 UConn, 70–63; No. 11 Notre Dame defeated No. 6 Alabama, 78–64	No. 12 Richmond defeated No. 5 Iowa, 67–63; No. 11 Iowa State defeated No. 6 LSU, 59–54	No. 11 Michigan defeated No. 6 Colorado State, 75–63	No. 15 Saint Peter's defeated No. 2 Kentucky, 85–79 ^{OT}
Round of 32	None	No. 11 Iowa State defeated No. 3 Wisconsin, 54–49; No. 10 Miami (FL) defeated No. 2 Auburn, 79–61	No. 11 Michigan defeated No. 3 Tennessee, 76–68	No. 8 North Carolina defeated No. 1 Baylor, 93–86 ^{OT}; No. 15 Saint Peter's defeated No. 7 Murray State, 70–60
Sweet 16	None	None	None	No. 15 Saint Peter's defeated No. 3 Purdue, 67–64
Elite 8	None	None	None	None
Final 4	No. 8 North Carolina defeated No. 2 Duke, 81–77			
National Championship	None			

=== Miscellaneous ===
- Indiana cheerleader Cassidy Cerny signed a name, image and likeness (NIL) deal after teaming with fellow cheerleader Nathan Paris to rescue a ball stuck on the backboard during the Hoosiers' first-round game against Saint Mary's. The moment went viral, and Arkansas cheerleaders used the same approach when another ball was stuck on the backboard during the Razorbacks' West Regional Final against Duke.

== Record by conference ==
Conference	Bids	Record	Win %	FF	R64	R32	S16	E8	F4	CG	NC
Big 12	6	13–5	.722	–	6	6	3	1	1	1	1
ACC	5	14–5	.737	1	5	4	3	3	2	1	–
Big East	6	7–6	.538	–	6	3	2	1	1	–	–
MAAC	1	3–1	.750	–	1	1	1	1	–	–	–
American	2	4–2	.667	–	2	2	1	1	–	–	–
SEC	6	5–6	.455	–	6	3	1	1	–	–	–
Pac-12	3	4–3	.571	–	3	2	2	–	–	–	–
Big Ten	9	9–9	.500	2	8	6	2	–	–	–	–
WCC	3	3–3	.500	–	3	2	1	–	–	–	–
Ohio Valley	1	1–1	.500	–	1	1	–	–	–	–	–
WAC	1	1–1	.500	–	1	1	–	–	–	–	–
Atlantic 10	2	1–2	.333	–	2	1	–	–	–	–	–
Horizon	1	1–1	.500	1	1	–	–	–	–	–	–
SWAC	1	1–1	.500	1	1	–	–	–	–	–	–
Mountain West	4	0–4	.000	1	3	–	–	–	–	–	–
Atlantic Sun	1	0–1	.000	–	1	–	–	–	–	–	–
America East	1	0–1	.000	–	1	–	–	–	–	–	–
Big Sky	1	0–1	.000	–	1	–	–	–	–	–	–
Big South	1	0–1	.000	–	1	–	–	–	–	–	–
Big West	1	0–1	.000	–	1	–	–	–	–	–	–
C-USA	1	0–1	.000	–	1	–	–	–	–	–	–
Colonial	1	0–1	.000	–	1	–	–	–	–	–	–
Ivy League	1	0–1	.000	–	1	–	–	–	–	–	–
MAC	1	0–1	.000	–	1	–	–	–	–	–	–
MEAC	1	0–1	.000	–	1	–	–	–	–	–	–
Missouri Valley	1	0–1	.000	–	1	–	–	–	–	–	–
Patriot	1	0–1	.000	–	1	–	–	–	–	–	–
Southern	1	0–1	.000	–	1	–	–	–	–	–	–
Summit	1	0–1	.000	–	1	–	–	–	–	–	–
Sun Belt	1	0–1	.000	–	1	–	–	–	–	–	–
Northeast	1	0–1	.000	1	–	–	–	–	–	–	–
Southland	1	0–1	.000	1	–	–	–	–	–	–	–

- The FF, R64, R32, S16, E8, F4, CG, and NC columns indicate how many teams from each conference were in the first four, round of 64 (first round), round of 32 (second round), Sweet 16, Elite Eight, Final Four, championship game, and national champion, respectively.

== Media coverage ==
=== Television ===
CBS Sports and Turner Sports had US television rights to the tournament. As part of a cycle that began in 2016, TBS televised the 2022 Final Four and the national championship game. The Final Four and title game broadcasts were the last CBS Sports assignments for longtime director Bob Fishman, who retired from CBS Sports after 47 years (and 50 with CBS) and has been a director on 39 of the 40 Final Fours CBS/Turner have carried. The 2022 Tournament was Mark Emmert's final one as the NCAA President with Charlie Baker succeeding him starting in 2023.

==== Television channels ====
- Selection Show – CBS
- First Four – truTV
- First and second rounds – CBS, TBS, TNT, and truTV
- Regional semifinals and final (Sweet Sixteen and Elite Eight) – CBS and TBS
- National semifinals (final Four) and championship – TBS, TNT, and truTV

==== Number of games per network ====
- CBS: 21
- TBS: 21
- TruTV: 16
- TNT: 15

==== Studio hosts ====
- Greg Gumbel (New York City and New Orleans) – first round, second round, regionals, Final Four and national championship game
- Ernie Johnson (New York City, Atlanta, and New Orleans) – first round, second round, regional semi-finals, Final Four and national championship game
- Nabil Karim (Atlanta) – First Four, first round and Second round
- Adam Lefkoe (New York City) – first round and Second round (game breaks)

==== Studio analysts ====
- Charles Barkley (New York City and New Orleans) – first round, second round, regionals, Final Four and national championship game
- Rex Chapman (Atlanta) – First Four, first round, second round and regional semi-finals
- Seth Davis (Atlanta and New Orleans) – First Four, first round, second round, regional semi-finals, Final Four and national championship game
- Scott Drew (Atlanta) – regional semi-finals
- Bob Huggins (Atlanta) – second round
- Bobby Hurley (New Orleans) – Final Four
- Clark Kellogg (New York City and New Orleans) – first round, second round, regionals, Final Four and national championship game
- Frank Martin (Atlanta) – first round
- Candace Parker (Atlanta and New Orleans) – First Four, first round, second round, regional semi-finals and Final Four
- Kenny Smith (New York City and New Orleans) – first round, second round, regionals, Final Four and national championship game
- Gene Steratore (New York City and New Orleans) (Rules Analyst) – First Four, first round, second round, regionals, Final Four and national championship game
- Wally Szczerbiak (New York City) – second round

==== Commentary teams ====
- Jim Nantz/Bill Raftery/Grant Hill/Tracy Wolfson – first and second rounds at Greenville, South Carolina; West Regional at San Francisco, California; Final Four and National Championship at New Orleans, Louisiana
- Brian Anderson/Jim Jackson/Allie LaForce – first and second rounds at Fort Worth, Texas; South Regional at San Antonio, Texas
- Ian Eagle/Jim Spanarkel/Jamie Erdahl – first and second rounds at Indianapolis, Indiana; East Regional at Philadelphia, Pennsylvania
- Kevin Harlan/Reggie Miller/Dan Bonner/Dana Jacobson – first and second rounds at Pittsburgh, Pennsylvania; Midwest Regional at Chicago, Illinois
- Brad Nessler/Brendan Haywood/Evan Washburn – first and second rounds at Buffalo, New York
- Spero Dedes/Debbie Antonelli/AJ Ross – first and second rounds at Milwaukee, Wisconsin
- Andrew Catalon/Steve Lappas/Andy Katz – first and second rounds at Portland, Oregon
- Lisa Byington/Steve Smith/Avery Johnson/Lauren Shehadi – first and second rounds at San Diego, California
- Tom McCarthy/Steve Lavin/Avery Johnson/Jon Rothstein – First Four at Dayton, Ohio

=== Radio ===
Westwood One had exclusive radio rights to the entire tournament.

==== First Four ====
- Lance Medow (first 3 games)/Dan Hoard (last game) and Stephen Bardo – at Dayton, Ohio

==== First and second rounds ====
- Kevin Kugler and Robbie Hummel – Fort Worth, Texas
- Brandon Gaudin and Austin Croshere – Indianapolis, Indiana
- Scott Graham and Jon Crispin – Buffalo, New York
- Ryan Radtke and Dan Dickau – Portland, Oregon
- Bill Rosinski and Jordan Cornette – Greenville, South Carolina
- Jason Benetti and Will Perdue – Milwaukee, Wisconsin
- John Sadak and Fran Fraschilla – Pittsburgh, Pennsylvania
- Dave Pasch and P. J. Carlesimo – San Diego, California

==== Regionals ====
- Tom McCarthy and Will Perdue – East Regional at Philadelphia, Pennsylvania
- Kevin Kugler and Robbie Hummel – Midwest Regional at Chicago, Illinois
- Scott Graham and P. J. Carlesimo – South Regional at San Antonio, Texas
- Ryan Radtke and Steve Lavin – West Regional at San Francisco, California

==== Final Four and National Championship ====
- Kevin Kugler, P. J. Carlesimo, Clark Kellogg and Andy Katz – New Orleans, Louisiana

=== Internet ===
Video

Live video of games is available for streaming through the following means:

- NCAA March Madness Live (website and app, no CBS games on digital media players; access to games on WarnerMedia channels (TBS, TNT, truTV) required TV Everywhere authentication through provider)
- Paramount+ (only CBS games, service subscription required)
- CBS Sports website and app (only CBS games)
- Watch TBS website and app (only TBS games, required TV Everywhere authentication)
- Watch TNT website and app (only TNT games, required TV Everywhere authentication)
- Watch truTV website and app (only truTV games, required TV Everywhere authentication)
- Websites and apps of cable, satellite, and OTT providers of CBS, TBS, TNT, and truTV (access required subscription)

In addition, the March Madness app offered Fast Break, whiparound coverage of games similar to NFL RedZone.

- Dave Briggs, Tony Delk, Tim Doyle (first round), Josh Pastner (second round) (New York City)

Audio

Live audio of games is available for streaming through the following means:

- NCAA March Madness Live (website and app)
- Westwood One Sports website
- TuneIn (website and app, required TuneIn Premium subscription)
- Websites and apps of Westwood One Sports affiliates

=== International ===
ESPN International had international rights to the tournament. Coverage uses CBS/Turner play-by-play teams until the Final Four.

- Brian Custer and Jay Bilas

== See also ==
- 2022 NCAA Division I women's basketball tournament
- 2022 NCAA Division II men's basketball tournament
- 2022 NCAA Division III men's basketball tournament
- 2022 National Invitation Tournament
- 2022 College Basketball Invitational
- 2022 The Basketball Classic
- Carolina–Duke rivalry
