= 2021–22 UCLA Bruins men's basketball team =

American college basketball season

2021–22 UCLA Bruins men's basketball

NCAA tournament, Sweet Sixteen
- Conference: Pac-12 Conference

Ranking
- Coaches: No. 11
- AP: No. 11
- Record: 27–8 (15–5 Pac-12)
- Head coach: Mick Cronin (3rd season)
- Associate head coach: Darren Savino (3rd season)
- Assistant coaches: Rod Palmer (3rd season); Michael Lewis (3rd season)
- Home arena: Pauley Pavilion (Capacity: 13,819)

2021–22 Pac-12 Conference men's basketball standings
	Conf.				Overall
Team	W		L	PCT	W		L	PCT
No. 2 Arizona †	18	–	2	.900	33	–	4	.892
No. 11 UCLA	15	–	5	.750	27	–	8	.771
No. 22 USC	14	–	6	.700	26	–	8	.765
Colorado	12	–	8	.600	21	–	12	.636
Oregon	11	–	9	.550	20	–	15	.571
Washington	11	–	9	.550	17	–	15	.531
Washington State	11	–	9	.550	22	–	15	.595
Arizona State	10	–	10	.500	14	–	17	.452
Stanford	8	–	12	.400	16	–	16	.500
California	5	–	15	.250	12	–	20	.375
Utah	4	–	16	.200	11	–	20	.355
Oregon State	1	–	19	.050	3	–	28	.097
† Conference tournament winner Rankings from AP poll

The 2021–22 UCLA Bruins men's basketball team represented the University of California, Los Angeles during the 2021–22 NCAA Division I season. The Bruins were led by third-year head coach Mick Cronin and they played their home games at Pauley Pavilion as members of the Pac-12 Conference. All ten players from the previous year's Final Four team returned. Johnny Juzang earned third-team All-American honors, and he was named first-team all-conference along with Tyger Campbell and Jaime Jaquez Jr. Jaquez, Jaylen Clark and Myles Johnson were also voted to the Pac-12 All-Defensive team. New this season is that the team's footwear, apparel, and equipment are provided by Jordan Brand and Nike.

UCLA was ranked nationally in the top 10 for most of the season. They began the season 5–0 before facing Gonzaga in a rematch of the Final Four from the 2021 NCAA tournament. However, the No. 2 Bruins suffered their first defeat in an 83–63 blowout to the No. 1 Bulldogs. The UCLA team experienced a COVID-19 outbreak starting on December 15, 2021, causing them to cancel three nonconference games and postpone two Pac-12 games. The Bruins resumed play on January 6, 2022, against Long Beach State. At this time, the team began to play behind closed doors due to COVID-19 restrictions on indoor events implemented by the campus. The rematch against the Beach, who UCLA defeated earlier in November, was scheduled after the Bruins' original opponents that week, Arizona State and Stanford, needed to postpone due to coronavirus issues in their programs. It was the first time UCLA faced a nonconference opponent twice in the same regular season since 1982–83, when they faced Notre Dame in a home and away series.

The Bruins lost in overtime to Oregon on January 13, their first defeat since late November. UCLA then won six straight conference games, including their sixth consecutive over rival Arizona, to gain sole possession of first place in the Pac-12. However, the Bruins lost their third game in four contests after falling to their crosstown rivals, USC. It was their fifth straight loss to the Trojans, their longest drought in the series since the 1940s. UCLA ended the regular season winning six of their last seven games. They won their regular-season finale against USC to claim the No. 2 seed in the Pac-12 tournament, breaking their tie with the Trojans for second place in the conference. It was the Bruins' first win in the series since February 2019, and their first under Cronin. UCLA advanced to the Pac-12 Tournament championship game, where they lost to Arizona. It was the Bruins' first appearance in the title game since their win in 2014 over the Wildcats.

Seeded No. 4 in the East Regional of the NCAA tournament, UCLA rallied in the opener for a 57–53 comeback win over 13th-seeded Akron. Campbell scored eight of the Bruins' final 10 points, and he finished with a team-high 16. The Bruins defeated fifth-seeded Saint Mary's 72–56 to advance to the Sweet 16 in consecutive seasons for the first time since 2015. UCLA was eliminated in the semifinals in a 73–66 loss to eighth-seeded North Carolina. The Bruins led by three points with two minutes remaining in a game that featured 14 lead changes and eight ties.

On March 25, assistant coach Michael Lewis was named as head coach of Ball State basketball team.

== Previous season ==
The Bruins are coming off of a season in which they made an improbable run in the NCAA tournament to the Final Four, where their upset bid against top-ranked Gonzaga in the National Semifinal fell just short in overtime, 93–90. UCLA, which had begun the tournament in the First Four, became just the fifth 11-seed to ever advance to the Final Four. They finished the season with a 22–10 overall record.

== Offseason ==
=== Departures ===
UCLA Departures
Name	Pos.	Height	Weight	Year	Hometown	Reason for Departure
Jalen Hill	F	6'10"	245	(redshirt) Junior	Corona, CA	Retired
Chris Smith	G	6'9"	215	Senior	Chicago, IL	Graduated; Declared for the 2021 NBA draft

=== Incoming transfers ===
UCLA incoming transfers
Name	Pos.	Height	Weight	Year	Hometown	Notes
Myles Johnson	C	6'10"	255	(redshirt) Junior	Long Beach, CA	Transfer from Rutgers. Will have two years of eligibility remaining.

=== 2021 recruiting class ===
College recruiting information
Name	Hometown	School	Height	Weight	Commit date
Peyton Watson; SF	Long Beach, CA	Long Beach Poly (CA)	6 ft 7 in (2.01 m)	180 lb (82 kg)	Jul 27, 2020
Peyton Watson; SF	Recruit ratings: Rivals: 247Sports: ESPN: (94)				
Will McClendon; SG	Las Vegas, NV	Bishop Gorman (NV)	6 ft 3 in (1.91 m)	200 lb (91 kg)	Jan 21, 2020
Will McClendon; SG	Recruit ratings: Rivals: 247Sports: ESPN: (84)				
Overall recruit ranking: Rivals: 10 247Sports: 33 ESPN: —
Note: In many cases, Scout, Rivals, 247Sports, On3, and ESPN may conflict in their listings of height and weight.; In these cases, the average was taken. ESPN grades are on a 100-point scale.; Sources: "UCLA 2021 Basketball Commitments". Rivals.; "2021 UCLA Bruins Recruiting Class". ESPN.; "2021 Team Ranking". Rivals.

== Preseason ==
- September 14, 2021 – Nan Wooden, daughter of former UCLA men's basketball Coach John Wooden and long time supporter of the basketball team, died.

=== Preseason rankings ===
- October 13, 2021 – The Bruins are picked as the No. 1 team in the Pac-12 media poll.

=== Preseason All-Americans ===
- Johnny Juzang and Jaime Jaquez Jr. are named to the Athlon Sports' pre-season All-America list, first and third team respectively.

=== Preseason award watchlists ===
- Tyger Campbell named to the Bob Cousy Award's watch list (Top point guard)
- Johnny Juzang named to the Jerry West Award's watch list (Top shooting guard)
- Jaime Jaquez Jr. named to the Julius Erving Award's watch list (Top small forward)
- Myles Johnson named to the Kareem Abdul-Jabbar Award's watch list (Top center)
- Jaime Jaquez Jr. and Johnny Juzang are named to the NABC Player of the Year watch list
- Tyger Campbell, Jaime Jaquez Jr. and Johnny Juzang: John R. Wooden Award watch list

== Roster ==
2021–22 UCLA Bruins men's basketball team
Players
Coaches

Pos.	#	Name	Height	Weight	Year	Previous school	Hometown
G	0	Jaylen Clark	6 ft 5 in (1.96 m)	210 lb (95 kg)	So	Etiwanda HS	Riverside, CA
G	1	Jules Bernard	6 ft 7 in (2.01 m)	210 lb (95 kg)	Sr	Windward School	Los Angeles, CA
F	2	Cody Riley	6 ft 9 in (2.06 m)	250 lb (113 kg)	RS Sr	Sierra Canyon School	Kansas City, KS
G	3	Johnny Juzang	6 ft 7 in (2.01 m)	215 lb (98 kg)	Jr	Kentucky	Tarzana, CA
G	4	Will McClendon (injured) (redshirt)	6 ft 2 in (1.88 m)	210 lb (95 kg)	Fr	Bishop Gorman HS	Las Vegas, NV
G	10	Tyger Campbell	5 ft 11 in (1.8 m)	180 lb (82 kg)	RS Jr	La Lumiere School	Cedar Rapids, IA
F	12	Mac Etienne (injured) (redshirt)	6 ft 10 in (2.08 m)	230 lb (104 kg)	RS Fr	Suffield Academy	New York, NY
G/F	13	Jake Kyman	6 ft 7 in (2.01 m)	215 lb (98 kg)	Jr	Santa Margarita Catholic HS	Aliso Viejo, CA
F/C	14	Kenneth Nwuba	6 ft 10 in (2.08 m)	255 lb (116 kg)	RS Jr	Huntington Prep	Lagos, Nigeria
C	15	Myles Johnson	6 ft 10 in (2.08 m)	255 lb (116 kg)	RS Sr	Rutgers	Long Beach, CA
F	20	Logan Cremonesi (W) (redshirt)	6 ft 8 in (2.03 m)	220 lb (100 kg)	So	Mater Dei HS	Oceanside, CA
G/F	23	Peyton Watson	6 ft 8 in (2.03 m)	200 lb (91 kg)	Fr	Long Beach Poly HS	Long Beach, CA
G/F	24	Jaime Jaquez Jr.	6 ft 7 in (2.01 m)	225 lb (102 kg)	Jr	Camarillo HS	Camarillo, CA
G	34	David Singleton	6 ft 4 in (1.93 m)	205 lb (93 kg)	Sr	Bishop Montgomery HS	Los Angeles, CA
G	43	Russell Stong (W)	6 ft 3 in (1.91 m)	190 lb (86 kg)	Sr	Crespi Carmelite HS	Northridge, CA

Head coach

- Mick Cronin (Cincinnati)

Assistant coach(es)

- Darren Savino (New Jersey City)
- Rod Palmer (UC Irvine)
- Michael Lewis (Indiana)

Legend

- (C) Team captain
- (S) Suspended
- (I) Ineligible
- (W) Walk-on
- Injured
- Current redshirt

Roster

== Schedule and results ==
Date time, TV	Rank^{#}	Opponent^{#}	Result	Record	High points	High rebounds	High assists	Site (attendance) city, state
Exhibition
November 4, 2021*; 7:00 pm, P12N	No. 2	Chico State	W 100–61	–	23 – Jaquez	9 – Johnson	5 – Jaquez	Pauley Pavilion (5,871); Los Angeles, CA
Regular season
November 9, 2021*; 8:00 pm, P12N	No. 2	Cal State Bakersfield	W 95–58	1–0	19 – Tied	7 – Clark	4 – Campbell	Pauley Pavilion (5,618); Los Angeles, CA
November 12, 2021*; 8:30 pm, ESPN2	No. 2	No. 4 Villanova	W 86–77 ^{OT}	2–0	25 – Juzang	13 – Jaquez	4 – Campbell	Pauley Pavilion (13,659); Los Angeles, CA
November 15, 2021*; 8:00 pm, P12N	No. 2	Long Beach State	W 100–79	3–0	25 – Juzang	6 – Clark	7 – Bernard	Pauley Pavilion (7,129); Los Angeles, CA
November 17, 2021*; 7:30 pm, P12N	No. 2	North Florida	W 98–63	4–0	20 – Jaquez	13 – Johnson	5 – Campbell	Pauley Pavilion (7,103); Los Angeles, CA
November 22, 2021*; 5:00 pm, ESPN+	No. 2	vs. Bellarmine; Empire Classic	W 75–62	5–0	19 – Watson	11 – Johnson	5 – Tied	T-Mobile Arena (7,001); Paradise, NV
November 23, 2021*; 7:00 pm, ESPN	No. 2	vs. No. 1 Gonzaga; Empire Classic	L 63–83	5–1	19 – Jaquez	6 – Jaquez	2 – Tied	T-Mobile Arena (12,795); Paradise, NV
November 27, 2021*; 2:00 pm, Stadium	No. 2	at UNLV	W 73–51	6–1	18 – Bernard	9 – Tied	5 – Jaquez	Thomas & Mack Center (6,392); Las Vegas, NV
December 1, 2021; 6:30 pm, P12N	No. 5	Colorado	W 73–61	7–1 (1–0)	21 – Campbell	10 – Johnson	6 – Juzang	Pauley Pavilion (7,941); Los Angeles, CA
December 11, 2021*; 6:30 pm, FS2/FS1	No. 4	at Marquette	W 67–56	8–1	24 – Jaquez	11 – Jaquez	8 – Campbell	Fiserv Forum (15,028); Milwaukee, WI
December 15, 2021*; 8:00 pm, P12N	No. 4	Alabama State	Canceled due to COVID-19 protocols within the UCLA program. (Note: This game was canceled on December 15 due to COVID-19 protocols within the Bruins program. This game was declared a no contest by the NCAA.)					Pauley Pavilion; Los Angeles, CA
December 18, 2021*; 12:00 pm, CBS	No. 4	vs. North Carolina; CBS Sports Classic	Canceled due to COVID-19 protocols within the UCLA program. (Note: This game was canceled on December 17 due to COVID-19 protocols within the Bruins program. This game was declared a no contest by the NCAA.)					T-Mobile Arena; Paradise, NV
December 22, 2021*; 7:00 pm, P12N	No. 5	Cal Poly	Canceled due to COVID-19 protocols within the UCLA program. (Note: This game was canceled on December 18 due to COVID-19 protocols within the Bruins program. This game was declared a no contest by the NCAA.)					Pauley Pavilion; Los Angeles, CA
January 6, 2022 (Note: This game was added on January 4, 2022.)*; 4:30 pm, P12N	No. 5	Long Beach State	W 96–78	9–1	22 – Bernard	9 – Johnson	10 – Campbell	Pauley Pavilion (236); Los Angeles, CA
January 8, 2022; 5:00 pm, P12N	No. 5	at California	W 60–52	10–1 (2–0)	17 – Campbell	7 – Bernard	4 – Campbell	Haas Pavilion (8,325); Berkeley, CA
January 13, 2022; 6:30 pm, ESPN	No. 3	Oregon	L 81–84 ^{OT}	10–2 (2–1)	23 – Juzang	9 – Juzang	4 – Campbell	Pauley Pavilion (119); Los Angeles, CA
January 15, 2022; 7:30 pm, P12N	No. 3	Oregon State	W 81–65	11–2 (3–1)	24 – Juzang	6 – Juzang	3 – Tied	Pauley Pavilion (141); Los Angeles, CA
January 20, 2022; 8:00 pm, FS1	No. 9	at Utah	W 63–58	12–2 (4–1)	28 – Juzang	7 – Bernard	3 – Jaquez	Jon M. Huntsman Center (7,785); Salt Lake City, UT
January 22, 2022; 6:00 pm, P12N	No. 9	at Colorado	W 71–65	13–2 (5–1)	23 – Juzang	6 – Juzang	4 – Jaquez	CU Events Center (8,774); Boulder, CO
January 25, 2022 (Note: This game was originally scheduled for December 30 before being postponed and rescheduled for January 25 due to COVID-19 protocols within the UCLA program.); 8:00 pm, ESPN	No. 7	No. 3 Arizona; Rivalry	W 75–59	14–2 (6–1)	15 – Tied	7 – Bernard	3 – Tied	Pauley Pavilion (11,268); Los Angeles, CA
January 27, 2022; 6:00 pm, P12N	No. 7	California	W 81–57	15–2 (7–1)	15 – Jaquez	6 – Watson	5 – Campbell	Pauley Pavilion (7,457); Los Angeles, CA
January 29, 2022; 6:30 pm, P12N	No. 7	Stanford	W 66–43	16–2 (8–1)	16 – Bernard	9 – Bernard	9 – Campbell	Pauley Pavilion (10,283); Los Angeles, CA
February 3, 2022; 5:00 pm, ESPN	No. 3	at No. 7 Arizona; Rivalry	L 66–76	16–3 (8–2)	15 – Bernard	8 – Riley	5 – Tied	McKale Center (14,644); Tucson, AZ
February 5, 2022; 7:00 pm, ESPN2	No. 3	at Arizona State	L 84–87 ^{3OT}	16–4 (8–3)	27 – Jaquez	11 – Jaquez	5 – Campbell	Desert Financial Arena (9,135); Tempe, AZ
February 8, 2022 (Note: This game was originally scheduled for January 6 before being postponed and rescheduled for February 8 due to COVID-19 protocols within the Stanford program.); 8:00 pm, ESPN2	No. 12	at Stanford	W 79–70	17–4 (9–3)	23 – Juzang	8 – Johnson	7 – Campbell	Maples Pavilion (4,288); Stanford, CA
February 12, 2022; 7:00 pm, ESPN	No. 12	at No. 21 USC; Rivalry	L 64–67	17–5 (9–4)	27 – Campbell	11 – Johnson	3 – Campbell	Galen Center (10,258); Los Angeles, CA
February 17, 2022; 8:00 pm, FS1	No. 13	Washington State	W 76–56	18–5 (10–4)	19 – Juzang	11 – Clark	5 – Clark	Pauley Pavilion (7,916); Los Angeles, CA
February 19, 2022; 7:00 pm, FS1	No. 13	Washington	W 76–50	19–5 (11–4)	25 – Clark	13 – Johnson	5 – Watson	Pauley Pavilion (10,586); Los Angeles, CA
February 21, 2022 (Note: This game was originally scheduled on January 1 before being postponed and rescheduled to January 5 due to COVID-19 protocols within the UCLA program. It was then postponed and rescheduled to February 21 due to COVID-19 protocols within the Arizona State program.); 6:00 pm, FS1	No. 12	Arizona State	W 66–52	20–5 (12–4)	16 – Tied	10 – Jaquez	3 – Tied	Pauley Pavilion (8,037); Los Angeles, CA
February 24, 2022; 6:30 pm, ESPN	No. 12	at Oregon	L 63–68	20–6 (12–5)	12 – Tied	5 – Tied	2 – Tied	Matthew Knight Arena (8,950); Eugene, OR
February 26, 2022; 1:00 pm, CBS	No. 12	at Oregon State	W 94–55	21–6 (13–5)	20 – Campbell	6 – Singleton	5 – Campbell	Gill Coliseum (4,584); Corvallis, OR
February 28, 2022 (Note: This game was originally scheduled on December 5 before being postponed and rescheduled on February 28 due to COVID-19 protocols within the Washington program.); 8:00 pm, ESPN2	No. 17	at Washington	W 77–66	22–6 (14–5)	30 – Jaquez	11 – Riley	4 – Campbell	Alaska Airlines Arena (6,248); Seattle, WA
March 5, 2022; 7:00 pm, ESPN	No. 17	No. 16 USC; Rivalry	W 75–68	23–6 (15–5)	27 – Jaquez	6 – Tied	4 – Tied	Pauley Pavilion (13,659); Los Angeles, CA
Pac-12 Tournament
March 10, 2022; 6:00 pm, P12N	(2) No. 13	vs. (7) Washington State; Quarterfinals	W 75–65	24–6	23 – Jaquez	11 – Jaquez	4 – Tied	T-Mobile Arena (10,417); Paradise, NV
March 11, 2022; 8:30 pm, FS1	(2) No. 13	vs. (3) No. 21 USC; Semifinals/Rivalry	W 69–59	25–6	19 – Jaquez	8 – Bernard	2 – Tied	T-Mobile Arena (14,158); Paradise, NV
March 12, 2022; 6:00 pm, FOX	(2) No. 13	vs. (1) No. 2 Arizona; Championship/Rivalry	L 76–84	25–7	19 – Bernard	10 – Jaquez	4 – Campbell	T-Mobile Arena (14,401); Paradise, NV
NCAA Tournament
March 17, 2022*; 6:50 pm, TBS	(4 E) No. 11	vs. (13 E) Akron; First Round	W 57–53	26–7	16 – Campbell	9 – Jaquez	6 – Jaquez	Moda Center (14,217); Portland, OR
March 19, 2022*; 4:10 pm, TBS	(4 E) No. 11	vs. (5 E) No. 18 Saint Mary's; Second Round	W 72–56	27–7	16 – Campbell	8 – Juzang	4 – Tied	Moda Center (17,907); Portland, OR
March 25, 2022*; 6:40 pm, CBS	(4 E) No. 11	vs. (8 E) North Carolina; Sweet Sixteen	L 66–73	27–8	16 – Bernard	5 – Tied	6 – Campbell	Wells Fargo Center (20,136); Philadelphia, PA
*Non-conference game. ^{#}Rankings from AP Poll. (#) Tournament seedings in parentheses. E=East. All times are in Pacific Time.

== Rankings ==
Ranking movements Legend: ██ Increase in ranking ██ Decrease in ranking т = Tied with team above or below ( ) = First-place votes
	Week																				
Poll	Pre	1	2	3	4	5	6	7	8	9	10	11	12	13	14	15	16	17	18	19	Final
AP	2 (8)	2 (8)*	2 (6)	2 (5)	5	4	4	5	5	5	3	9	7т	3	12	13	12	17	13	11	Not released
Coaches	2 (2)	2 (2)*	2 (2)^	2 (2)	5	4	3	6	5	5	3	9	8	4	12	14	13	18	13	12	11

*The preseason and week 1 polls were the same.
^Coaches poll was not released for Week 2.

== Statistics ==
Record	UCLA	OPP
Scoring	2639	2256
Scoring Average	75.4	64.5
Field goals - Att	967–2148	809–1948
3-pt. Field Goals - Att	237–671	238–742
Free Throws - Att	468–632	400–551
Rebounds	1281	1161
Assists	486	406
Turnovers	313	460
Steals	244	156
Blocked Shots	116	111

== Awards and honors ==
Recipient	Award (Pac-12 Conference)	Stats (PPG/RPG/APG)	Week	Date awarded	Ref.
Johnny Juzang	Player of the Week	22.0/6.0/0.5	November 9–14	November 15, 2021	
Tyger Campbell	Player of the Week	14.0/2.0/7.0	January 4–9	January 10, 2022	
Johnny Juzang	Player of the Week		January 17–23	January 24, 2022	
Jaime Jaquez Jr.	Player of the Week	28.5/7.5/2.5	February 28–March 6	March 7, 2022	
Tyger Campbell	All-Pac-12 first-team		–	March 8, 2022	
Jaime Jaquez Jr.	All-Pac-12 first-team		–	March 8, 2022	
Johnny Juzang	All-Pac-12 first-team		–	March 8, 2022	
Jaylen Clark	Pac-12 All-defensive team		–	March 8, 2022	
Jaime Jaquez Jr.	Pac-12 All-defensive team		–	March 8, 2022	
Myles Johnson	Pac-12 All-defensive team		–	March 8, 2022	
Peyton Watson	Pac-12 All-freshman team (Honorable mention)		–	March 8, 2022	

- December 7, 2021 – Jules Bernard and Myles Johnson were named as candidates for the men's basketball Senior CLASS Award
- January 5, 2022 – Jaime Jaquez and Johnny Juzang were named to the Wooden Award Midseason Top 25 watchlist.
- January 31, 2022 – Tyger Campbell selected to the Bob Cousy Award 10-person watch list
- January 31, 2022 – Johnny Juzang named to the John R. Wooden Award 20-person late season watch list
- February 1, 2022 – Johnny Juzang is named to the Jerry West Award 10-person watch list, honoring the nation's top shooting guard
- February 2, 2022 – Jaime Jaquez Jr. is listed on the Julius Erving Award 10-person watch list, presented to the nation's top small forward.
- March 15, 2022 – Johnny Juzang, Tyger Campbell, and Jaime Jaquez Jr. are named to the NABC All-District 19 teams
- Juzang was named a third-team All-American by the National Association of Basketball Coaches.
