= Jalen Wilson =

American basketball player (born 2000)

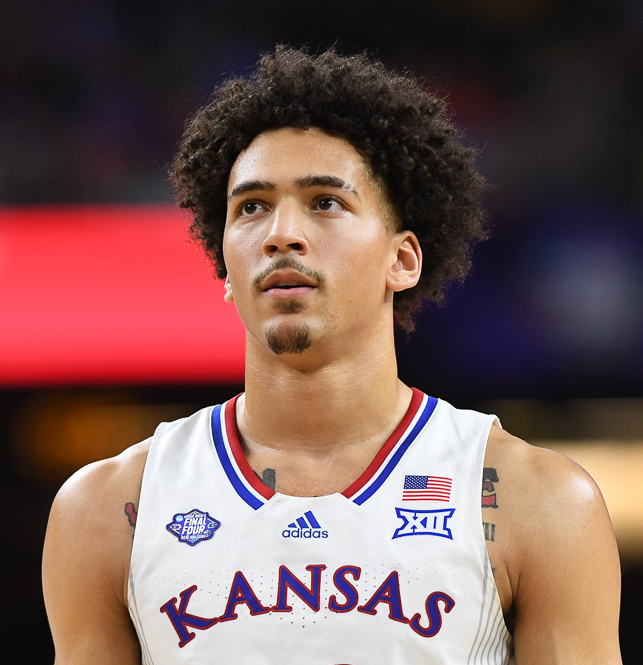
- Wilson with Kansas in 2022

No. 22 – Atlanta Hawks
- Position: Small forward / power forward
- League: NBA

Personal information
- Born: November 4, 2000 (age 26) Arlington, Texas, U.S.
- Listed height: 6 ft 6 in (1.98 m)
- Listed weight: 220 lb (100 kg)

Career information
- High school: John H. Guyer (Denton, Texas)
- College: Kansas (2019–2023)
- NBA draft: 2023: 2nd round, 51st overall pick
- Drafted by: Brooklyn Nets
- Playing career: 2023–present

Career history
- 2023–2026: Brooklyn Nets
- 2023–2024: →Long Island Nets
- 2026–present: Atlanta Hawks
- 2026–present: →College Park Skyhawks

Career highlights
- NCAA champion (2022); Consensus first-team All-American (2023); Julius Erving Award (2023); Big 12 Player of the Year (2023); First-team All-Big 12 (2023); Third-team All-Big 12 (2022); Big 12 All-Newcomer Team (2021); Big 12 All-Freshman Team (2021)
- Stats at NBA.com
- Stats at Basketball Reference

Jalen Derale Wilson (born November 4, 2000) is an American professional basketball player for the Atlanta Hawks of the National Basketball Association (NBA), on a two-way contract with the College Park Skyhawks of the NBA G League. He played college basketball for the Kansas Jayhawks. He was named a consensus first-team All-American his junior year.

== High school career ==
Wilson attended John H. Guyer High School in Denton, Texas. As a junior, he averaged 16.1 points, 6.2 rebounds and 3.3 assists per game. As a senior, he averaged 18.1 points, 7.5 rebounds and three assists per game, earning Class 6A All-State honors.

=== Recruiting ===
Wilson was a consensus four-star recruit and was considered the 46th-best player in the 2019 class by 247Sports. He originally committed to playing college basketball for Michigan but reopened his recruitment with the departure of head coach John Beilein. He later committed to Kansas over an offer from North Carolina, among others.

College recruiting
Name	Hometown	School	Height	Weight	Commit date
Jalen Wilson; SF	Denton, TX	John H. Guyer (TX)	6 ft 8 in (2.03 m)	210 lb (95 kg)	Jun 12, 2019
Jalen Wilson; SF	Recruit ratings: Rivals: 247Sports: ESPN: (85)				
Overall recruit ranking: Rivals: 47 247Sports: 46 ESPN: 73
Note: In many cases, Scout, Rivals, 247Sports, On3, and ESPN may conflict in their listings of height and weight.; In these cases, the average was taken. ESPN grades are on a 100-point scale.; Sources: "Kansas 2019 Basketball Commitments". Rivals.; "2019 Kansas Jayhawks Recruiting Class". ESPN.; "2019 Team Ranking". Rivals.

== College career ==
On November 8, 2019, Wilson suffered a broken ankle against UNC Greensboro in his second career game. He missed the remainder of the season and was granted a medical redshirt after undergoing surgery. On December 8, 2020, Wilson recorded 23 points and 10 rebounds, making a go-ahead three-pointer with 42 seconds remaining, in a 73–72 win over eighth-ranked Creighton. As a freshman, Wilson averaged 11.8 points and 7.9 rebounds per game, earning Big 12 All-Freshman Team honors. On April 9, 2021, he declared for the 2021 NBA draft while maintaining his college eligibility. Wilson ultimately returned to Kansas. On November 2, he was suspended for three games due to an arrest on suspicion of DUI. Wilson was named to the third-team All-Big 12 as a sophomore. He averaged 11.1 points and 7.4 rebounds per game, helping the Jayhawks win a national title. Following the season Wilson declared for the 2022 NBA draft but ultimately withdrew from the draft. As a junior, Wilson was named Big 12 Player of the Year.

== Professional career ==
=== Brooklyn Nets (2023–2026) ===
Wilson was selected by the Brooklyn Nets with the 51st overall pick in the second round of the 2023 NBA draft. On July 5, 2023, Wilson signed a two-way contract with the Nets. On December 27, Wilson recorded his first double double, scoring a career-high 21 points and grabbing ten rebounds in a 144-122 loss to the Milwaukee Bucks. On March 1, 2024, the Brooklyn Nets converted Wilson's two-way contract to a standard multi-year NBA contract. He made 43 appearances (including three starts) for Brooklyn as a rookie, averaging 5.0 points, 3.0 rebounds, and 1.0 assists.

Wilson made 79 appearances (including 22 starts) for the Nets during the 2024–25 NBA season, recording averages of 9.5 points, 3.4 rebounds, and 1.8 assists. He played in 54 games (starting two) for Brooklyn in the 2025–26 season, averaging 6.4 points, 2.1 rebounds, and 0.9 assists.

=== Atlanta Hawks / College Park Skyhawks (2026–present) ===
On July 20, 2026, Wilson signed a two–way contract with the Atlanta Hawks.

== Career statistics ==
Legend
GP	Games played	GS	Games started	MPG	Minutes per game
FG%	Field goal percentage	3P%	3-point field goal percentage	FT%	Free throw percentage
RPG	Rebounds per game	APG	Assists per game	SPG	Steals per game
BPG	Blocks per game	PPG	Points per game	**Bold**	Career high

=== NBA ===
Year	Team	GP	GS	MPG	FG%	3P%	FT%	RPG	APG	SPG	BPG	PPG
2023–24	Brooklyn	43	3	15.5	**.425**	.324	**.826**	3.0	1.0	.3	**.1**	5.0
2024–25	Brooklyn	**79**	**22**	**25.7**	.397	.337	.818	**3.4**	**1.8**	**.5**	**.1**	**9.5**
2025–26	Brooklyn	54	2	15.9	.396	**.355**	.719	2.1	0.9	.4	0	7.4
Career		176	27	20.2	.401	.340	.788	2.9	1.4	.4	.1	7.4

=== College ===
Year	Team	GP	GS	MPG	FG%	3P%	FT%	RPG	APG	SPG	BPG	PPG
2019–20	Kansas	2	0	1.0	.000	.000	.000	.0	.0	.0	.0	.0
2020–21	Kansas	29	26	28.3	.414	.333	.630	7.9	2.0	.4	.3	11.8
2021–22	Kansas	**37**	27	29.4	**.461**	.263	.722	7.4	1.8	**.9**	.4	11.1
2022–23	Kansas	36	**36**	**35.4**	.430	**.337**	**.799**	**8.3**	**2.2**	**.9**	**.5**	**20.1**
Career		75	60	28.7	.435	.298	.690	7.6	2.0	.7	.3	12.2

== Personal life ==
Wilson's father, Derale, played college basketball for TCU and professionally overseas.
