= 2021–22 Pac-12 Conference men's basketball season =

2021–22 Pac–12 men's basketball season
- League: NCAA Division I
- Sport: Basketball
- Teams: 12
- TV partner(s): ESPN, ESPN2, ESPNU, Fox Sports 1, FOX, Pac-12 Network, CBS

Regular season
- Regular season champions: Arizona Wildcats
- Season MVP: Bennedict Mathurin, Arizona Wildcats
- Top scorer: Terrell Brown Jr., Washington Huskies

Pac-12 tournament
- Champions: Arizona Wildcats
- Runners-up: UCLA
- Tournament MVP: Bennedict Mathurin, Arizona

Pac-12 men's basketball seasons
- ← 2020–21 2022–23 →

2021–22 Pac-12 Conference men's basketball standings
	Conf.				Overall
Team	W		L	PCT	W		L	PCT
No. 2 Arizona †	18	–	2	.900	33	–	4	.892
No. 11 UCLA	15	–	5	.750	27	–	8	.771
No. 22 USC	14	–	6	.700	26	–	8	.765
Colorado	12	–	8	.600	21	–	12	.636
Oregon	11	–	9	.550	20	–	15	.571
Washington	11	–	9	.550	17	–	15	.531
Washington State	11	–	9	.550	22	–	15	.595
Arizona State	10	–	10	.500	14	–	17	.452
Stanford	8	–	12	.400	16	–	16	.500
California	5	–	15	.250	12	–	20	.375
Utah	4	–	16	.200	11	–	20	.355
Oregon State	1	–	19	.050	3	–	28	.097
† Conference tournament winner Rankings from AP poll

The 2021–22 Pac-12 Conference men's basketball season began with practices starting in October, followed by the 2021–22 NCAA Division I men's basketball season which started on November 9. Conference play began on November 28. This was the tenth season under the Pac–12 Conference name and the 62nd since the conference was established under its current charter as the Athletic Association of Western Universities in 1959. Including the history of the Pacific Coast Conference, which operated from 1915 to 1959 and is considered by the Pac-12 as a part of its own history, this was the Pac-12's 106th season of basketball.

The Pac-12 tournament was played March 9–12, 2022 at the T-Mobile Arena in Paradise, Nevada.

== Pre-season ==
=== Recruiting classes ===
Rankings
Team	ESPN	Rivals	On3 Recruits	Scout/247 Sports	Signees
Arizona	—	No. 44	No. 50	No. 79	2
Arizona State	―	No. 14	No. 11	No. 28	6
California	―	No. 38	―	No. 64	3
Colorado	No. 17	No. 9	No. 37	No. 13	5
Oregon	―	―	No. 7	No. 73	2
Oregon State	―	―	―	No. 69	2
Stanford	No. 16	No. 15	No. 20	No. 21	4
UCLA	No. 15	No. 5	No. 14	No. 36	2
USC	―	―	No. 44	No. 41	3
Utah	―	―	―	―	1
Washington	―	No. 46	No. 47	No. 48	3
Washington State	―	No. 58	No. 30	No. 59	2

=== Preseason watchlists ===
Below is a table of notable preseason watch lists.

	Wooden	Naismith	Robertson	Cousy	West	Erving	Malone	Abdul-Jabbar	Olson
Marcus Bagley						✓			
Tyger Campbell	✓			✓					
Quincy Guerrier							✓		
De'Vion Harmon					✓				
Harrison Ingram						✓			
Jaime Jaquez Jr.	✓	✓				✓			✓
Myles Johnson								✓	
Johnny Juzang	✓	✓			✓				✓
Bennedict Mathurin					✓				
Isaiah Mobley	✓	✓					✓		✓
Will Richardson	✓	✓		✓					
Ąžuolas Tubelis							✓		
Jabari Walker						✓			

=== Preseason All-American teams ===
	ESPN	CBS	USA	AP	Blue; Ribbon	Athlon; Sports	NBC; Sports	Street & Smith's	Sporting News	Sports; Illustrated
Johnny Juzang		1st		1st		1st			1st	1st
Jaime Jaquez Jr.		2nd				3rd				3rd

=== Preseason polls ===
	AP	Athlon Sports	Blue Ribbon	CBS Sports	Coaches	ESPN	KenPom	Lindy's; Sports	Sports; Illustrated	Sporting; News
Arizona	RV	–	–	No. 29	RV	–	No. 47	–	No. 29	–
Arizona State	–	–	–	No. 82	–	–	No. 58	–	No. 58	–
California	–	–	–	No. 119	–	–	No. 101	–	No. 163	–
Colorado	RV	–	–	No. 62	RV	–	No. 35	–	No. 72	–
Oregon	No. 13	No. 13	No. 19	No. 12	No. 12	No. 12	No. 29	No. 8	No. 12	No. 12
Oregon State	–	–	–	No. 78	–	–	No. 73	–	No. 92	–
Stanford	–	–	–	No. 73	–	–	No. 68	–	No. 75	–
UCLA	No. 2	No. 2	No. 2	No. 6	No. 2	No. 3	No. 7	No. 2	No. 4	No. 2
USC	RV	No. 22	–	No. 21	RV	–	No. 20	–	No. 37	–
Utah	–	–	–	No 103	–	–	No. 93	–	No. 99	–
Washington	–	–	–	No. 94	–	–	No. 102	–	No. 105	–
Washington State	–	–	–	No. 52	–	–	No. 63	–	No. 51	–

=== Pac-12 Media days ===
The Pac-12 will conduct its 2021 Pac-12 media days at the Pac-12 Studio, in San Francisco, California, on October 13, 2021 (Pac-12 Network).

The teams and representatives in respective order were as follows:

- Pac-12 Commissioner – George Kliavkoff
- Deputy Commissioner and Chief Operating Officer(MBB) – Jamie Zaninovich
- Arizona – Tommy Lloyd (HC), Bennedict Mathurin (G/F), Ąžuolas Tubelis (PF)
- Arizona State – Bobby Hurley (HC), Marcus Bagley (SF), Kimani Lawrence (PF)
- California – Mark Fox (HC), Grant Anticevich (PF), Andre Kelly (SF)
- Colorado – Tad Boyle (HC), Evan Battey (PF), Elijah Parquet (SG)
- Oregon – Dana Altman (HC), Will Richardson (PG), Eric Williams Jr. (SG)
- Oregon State – Wayne Tinkle (HC), Warith Alatishe (SF), Jarod Lucas (PG)
- Stanford – Jerod Haase (HC), Jaiden Delaire (SF), Spencer Jones (SF)
- UCLA – Mick Cronin (HC), Jaime Jaquez Jr. (SF), Johnny Juzang (SG)
- USC – Andy Enfield (HC), Isaiah Mobley (PF), Drew Peterson (SG)
- Utah – Craig Smith (HC), Riley Battin (PF), Branden Carlson (C)
- Washington – Mike Hopkins (HC), Jamal Bey (SG), Nate Roberts (PF)
- Washington State – Kyle Smith (HC), Efe Abogidi (PF), Tyrell Roberts (PG)

Men's Basketball Media Preseason Poll
Place	Team	Points	First place votes
1.	UCLA	404	32
2.	Oregon	373	2
3.	USC	320	--
T4.	Arizona	245	--
T4.	Oregon State	245	--
6.	Colorado	235	--
7.	Arizona State	224	--
8.	Washington State	221	--
9.	Stanford	151	--
10.	Utah	105	--
11.	Washington	85	--
12.	California	44	--

=== Pac-12 Preseason All-Conference ===
First Team

Name	School	Pos.	Yr.	Ht., Wt.	Hometown (Last School)
Warith Alatishe	Oregon State	Sr.	F	6'8”, 210	Westside HS
Marcus Bagley	Arizona State	So.	F	6'8", 215	Sheldon HS
Evan Battey	Colorado	R-Sr.	F	6'8”, 259	Villa Park HS
Tyger Campbell	UCLA	R-Jr.	G	5'11”, 180	La Lumiere School
Jaime Jaquez Jr.	UCLA	Jr.	G/F	6'7”, 225	Camarillo HS
Johnny Juzang	UCLA	Jr.	G	6'7”, 215	Harvard-Westlake School
Bennedict Mathurin	Arizona	So.	G	6'6”, 210	NBA Academy Latin America (MX)
Isaiah Mobley	USC	Jr.	F	6'10”, 240	Rancho Christian School
Will Richardson	Oregon	Sr.	G	6'5”, 180	Oak Hill Academy
Noah Williams	Washington State	Jr.	G	6'5”, 195	O'Dea HS

Second Team

Name	School	Pos.	Yr.	Ht., Wt.	Hometown (Last School)
Boogie Ellis	USC	Jr.	G	6'3”, 185	Mission Bay
Quincy Guerrier	Oregon	Jr.	F	6'8”, 220	Thetford Academy
De'Vion Harmon	Oregon	Jr.	G	6'2”, 180	John Guyer HS
Jarod Lucas	Oregon State	Jr.	G	6'4”, 195	Los Altos HS
Ąžuolas Tubelis	Arizona	So.	F	6'11”, 245	Rytas Vilnius

Honorable Mention

Efe Abogidi (So., WSU); Daejon Davis (Gr., WASH); Jaiden Delaire (Sr., STAN); Harrison Ingram (Fr., STAN); Jabari Walker (So., COLO); Peyton Watson (Fr., UCLA).

=== Midseason watchlists ===
Below is a table of notable midseason watch lists.

	John R. Wooden Award	Naismith	Naismith DPOY	Cousy	West	Erving	Malone	Abdul-Jabbar
Tyger Campbell				✓				
Harrison Ingram						✓		
Jaime Jaquez Jr.	✓					✓		
Johnny Juzang	✓				✓			
Christian Koloko			✓					
Bennedict Mathurin	✓				✓			
Isaiah Mobley	✓						✓	
Will Richardson				✓				
Ąžuolas Tubelis							✓	

=== Final watchlists ===
Below is a table of notable year end watch lists.

	John R. Wooden Award	Naismith Play of the Year'	Naismith Defensive Player of the Year'	Cousy	West	Erving
Tyger Campbell				✓		
Christian Koloko			✓			
Jaime Jaquez Jr.						✓
Johnny Juzang	✓	✓			✓	
Bennedict Mathurin	✓	✓			✓	
Isaiah Mobley		✓				

== Regular season ==
The Schedule will be released in late October. Before the season, it was announced that for the seventh consecutive season, all regular season conference games and conference tournament games would be broadcast nationally by CBS Sports, FOX Sports, ESPN Inc. family of networks including ESPN, ESPN2 and ESPNU, and the Pac-12 Network.

=== Early season tournaments ===
Team	Tournament	Finish
Arizona	Roman Main Event	1st
Arizona State	Battle 4 Atlantis	8th
California	Fort Myers Tip-Off	4th
Colorado	Paradise Jam	4th
Oregon	Maui Invitational	4th
Oregon State	Emerald Coast Classic	4th
Stanford	Diamond Head Classic	N/A
UCLA	Empire Classic	2nd
USC	Wooden Legacy	1st
Utah	Sunshine Slam	1st(Bracket A)
Washington	Sanford Pentagon Crossover Classic	Round Robin
Washington State	Washington State Multi-Team Event	Round Robin

=== Records against other conferences ===
2021–22 records against non-conference opponents through the 2022 Season:

Regular season

Power Conferences	Record
ACC	2–2
Big East	3–1
Big Ten	2–1
Big 12	0–6
SEC	0–5
Power Conferences Total	7–15
Other NCAA Division 1 Conferences	Record
American	4–2
America East	1–0
A-10	3–0
ASUN	6–0
Big Sky	14–1
Big South	2–1
Big West	9–3
CAA	0–0
C-USA	0–0
Horizon	1–0
Ivy League	3–1
MAAC	1–0
MAC	0–1
MEAC	0–0
MVC	1–2
Mountain West	8–5
NEC	0–0
OVC	0–0
Patriot League	0–0
SoCon	0–1
Southland	1–0
SWAC	4–0
The Summit	2–1
Sun Belt	0–0
WAC	8–2
WCC	7–6
Other Division I Total	75–26
Division II Total	1–0
NCAA Division I Total	83–41

Postseason

Power Conferences	Record
ACC	0–1
Big East	0–0
Big Ten	0–0
Big 12	1–2
SEC	0–1
Power Conferences Total	1–4
Other NCAA Division 1 Conferences	Record
American	1–1
America East	0–0
A-10	0–1
ASUN	0–0
Big Sky	0–0
Big South	0–0
Big West	0–0
CAA	0–0
C-USA	0–0
Horizon	1–0
Ivy League	0–0
MAAC	0–0
MAC	1–0
MEAC	0–0
MVC	0–0
Mountain West	1–0
NEC	0–0
OVC	0–0
Patriot League	0–0
SoCon	0–0
Southland	0–0
SWAC	0–0
The Summit	0–0
Sun Belt	0–0
WAC	0–0
WCC	3–0
Other Division I Total	7–2
NCAA Division I Total	8–6

=== Record against ranked non-conference opponents ===
This is a list of games against ranked opponents only (rankings from the AP Poll):

Date	Visitor	Home	Site	Significance	Score	Conference record
Nov 12	No. 4 Villanova	No. 2 UCLA	Pauley Pavilion ● Los Angeles, CA	―	UCLA 86―77 OT	1―0
Nov 20	Stanford	No. 9 Baylor	Ferrell Center ● Waco, TX	―	Baylor 86―48	1―1
Nov 21	No. 4 Michigan	Arizona†	T-Mobile Arena ● Las Vegas, NV	Roman Main Event	Arizona 80―62	2―1
Nov 22	No. 23 Florida	California†	Suncoast Credit Union Arena ● Fort Myers, FL	Fort Myers Tip-Off	Florida 80―60	2―2
Nov 23	No. 1 Gonzaga	No. 2 UCLA†	T-Mobile Arena ● Las Vegas, NV	Empire Classic	Gonzaga 83―63	2―3
Nov 24	No. 12 Houston	Oregon†	Michelob Ultra Arena ● Las Vegas, NV	Maui Invitational tournament	Houston 78―49	2―4
Nov 24	No. 21 Seton Hall	California†	Suncoast Credit Union Arena ● Fort Myers, FL	Fort Myers Tip-Off	Seton Hall 62―59	2―5
Nov 24	No. 6 Baylor	Arizona State†	Imperial Arena ● Nassau, Bahamas	Battle 4 Atlantis	Baylor 75―63	2―6
Nov 27	No. 18 BYU	Utah	Jon M. Huntsman Center ● Salt Lake City, UT	BYU–Utah rivalry	BYU 75―64	2―7
Dec 4	No. 13 Tennessee	Colorado	CU Events Center ● Boulder, CO	―	Tennessee 69―54	2―8
Dec 18	No. 1 Baylor	Oregon	Matthew Knight Arena ● Eugene, OR	―	Baylor 78―70	2―9
Dec 19	No. 17 Texas	Stanford†	T-Mobile Arena ● Las Vegas, NV	Pac-12 Coast-to-Coast Challenge	Texas 60―53	2―10
Dec 22	No. 6 Arizona	No. 19 Tennessee	Thompson-Boling Arena ● Knoxville, TN	―	Tennessee 77―73	2―11

Team rankings are reflective of AP poll when the game was played, not current or final ranking

† denotes game was played on neutral site

=== Conference schedule ===
This table summarizes the head-to-head results between teams in conference play.

	Arizona	ASU	California	Colorado	Oregon	OSU	Stanford	UCLA	USC	Utah	Washington	WSU
vs. Arizona	–	0–2	0–2	1–1	0–1	0–2	0–2	1–1	0–2	0–2	0–2	0–1
vs. Arizona State	2–0	–	1–1	1–1	0–2	0–1	1–1	1–1	2–0	0–2	1–0	1–1
vs. California	2–0	1–1	–	1–0	0–1	0–2	1–1	2–0	2–0	2–0	2–0	2–0
vs. Colorado	1–1	1–1	0–1	–	1–1	0–2	0–2	2–0	1–0	0–2	1–1	1–1
vs. Oregon	1–0	2–0	1–0	1–1	–	0–2	1–1	0–2	1–1	0–2	1–1	1–1
vs. Oregon State	2–0	1–0	2–0	2–0	2–0	–	1–0	2–0	2–0	1–1	2–0	2–0
vs. Stanford	2–0	1–1	1–1	2–0	1–1	0–1	–	2–0	0–2	1–0	1–1	1–1
vs. UCLA	1–1	1–1	0–2	0–2	2–0	0–2	0–2	–	1–1	0–1	0–2	0–1
vs. USC	2–0	0–2	0–2	0–1	1–1	0–2	2–0	1–1	–	0–2	0–1	0–2
vs. Utah	2–0	2–0	0–2	2–0	2–0	1–1	0–1	1–0	2–0	–	2–0	2–0
vs. Washington	2–0	0–1	0–2	1–1	1–1	0–2	1–1	2–0	1–0	0–2	–	1–1
vs. Washington State	1–0	1–1	0–2	1–1	1–1	0–2	1–1	1–0	2–0	0–2	1–1	–
Total	18–2	10–10	5–15	12–8	11–9	1–19	8–12	15–5	14–6	4–16	11–9	11–9

=== Points scored ===
Team	For	Against	Difference
Arizona	3,107	2,518	589
Arizona State	2,027	2,084	-57
California	2,018	2,114	-96
Colorado	2,345	2,224	121
Oregon	2,532	2,440	92
Oregon State	2,117	2,422	-305
Stanford	2,124	2,198	-74
UCLA	2,639	2,256	383
USC	2,461	2,243	218
Utah	2,091	2,115	-24
Washington	2,260	2,314	-54
Washington State	2,644	2,400	244

Through 2022 Season

=== Rankings ===
	Improvement in ranking
	Drop in ranking
RV	Received votes but were not ranked in Top 25
NV	No votes received

Team	Poll	Pre	Wk 2	Wk 3	Wk 4	Wk 5	Wk 6	Wk 7	Wk 8	Wk 9	Wk 10	Wk 11	Wk 12	Wk 13	Wk 14	Wk 15	Wk 16	Wk 17	Wk 18	Wk 19	Final
Arizona	AP	RV	RV	17	11	11	8	6	9	8	6	3	3	7	4	3	2	2	2	2	−
Arizona	C	RV	RV	19	11	8	6	4т	7	7	6	3	3	5	5	4	2	3	2	2	6
Arizona State	AP	NV	NV	NV	NV	NV	NV	NV	NV	NV	NV	NV	NV	NV	NV	NV	NV	NV	NV	NV	−
Arizona State	C	NV	NV	NV	NV	NV	NV	NV	NV	NV	NV	NV	NV	NV	NV	NV	NV	NV	NV	NV	NV
California	AP	NV	NV	NV	NV	NV	NV	NV	NV	NV	NV	NV	NV	NV	NV	NV	NV	NV	NV	NV	−
California	C	NV	NV	NV	NV	NV	NV	NV	NV	NV	NV	NV	NV	NV	NV	NV	NV	NV	NV	NV	NV
Colorado	AP	RV	NV	NV	NV	NV	NV	NV	NV	NV	NV	NV	NV	NV	NV	NV	NV	NV	NV	NV	−
Colorado	C	RV	RV	NV	NV	NV	NV	NV	NV	NV	NV	NV	NV	NV	NV	NV	NV	NV	NV	NV	NV
Oregon	AP	13	12	RV	NV	NV	NV	NV	NV	NV	NV	RV	RV	NV	RV	NV	NV	NV	NV	NV	−
Oregon	C	12	12	23	NV	NV	NV	NV	NV	NV	NV	RV	RV	RV	RV	NV	NV	NV	NV	NV	NV
Oregon State	AP	NV	NV	NV	NV	NV	NV	NV	NV	NV	NV	NV	NV	NV	NV	NV	NV	NV	NV	NV	−
Oregon State	C	NV	NV	NV	NV	NV	NV	NV	NV	NV	NV	NV	NV	NV	NV	NV	NV	NV	NV	NV	NV
Stanford	AP	NV	NV	NV	NV	NV	NV	NV	NV	NV	NV	NV	NV	NV	NV	NV	NV	NV	NV	NV	−
Stanford	C	NV	NV	NV	NV	NV	NV	NV	NV	NV	NV	NV	NV	NV	NV	NV	NV	NV	NV	NV	NV
UCLA	AP	2	2	2	5	4	4	5	5	5	3	9	7т	3	12	13	12	17	13	11	−
UCLA	C	2	2	2	5	4	3	6	5	5	3	9	8	4	12	14	13	18	13	12	11
USC	AP	RV	25	24	20	16	10	8	7	7	5	16	15	19	21	17	16	16	21	22	−
USC	C	RV	RV	24	18	15	9	9	9	8	7	15	15	19	21	17	16	16	21	22	RV
Utah	AP	NV	NV	NV	NV	NV	NV	NV	NV	NV	NV	NV	NV	NV	NV	NV	NV	NV	NV	NV	−
Utah	C	NV	NV	NV	NV	NV	NV	NV	NV	NV	NV	NV	NV	NV	NV	NV	NV	NV	NV	NV	NV
Washington	AP	NV	NV	NV	NV	NV	NV	NV	NV	NV	NV	NV	NV	NV	NV	NV	NV	NV	NV	NV	−
Washington	C	NV	NV	NV	NV	NV	NV	NV	NV	NV	NV	NV	NV	NV	NV	NV	NV	NV	NV	NV	NV
Washington State	AP	NV	NV	NV	NV	NV	NV	NV	NV	NV	NV	NV	NV	NV	NV	NV	NV	NV	NV	NV	−
Washington State	C	NV	NV	NV	NV	NV	NV	NV	NV	NV	NV	NV	NV	NV	NV	NV	NV	NV	NV	NV	NV

^AP poll is not released for the Final Week.

== Head coaches ==
=== Coaching changes ===
On March 16, 2021, Utah fired Larry Krystkowiak as head coach after 10 seasons. Utah hired former Utah State coach Craig Smith in March 27, 2021.

On April 7, 2021, Arizona fired Sean Miller as head coach after 12 seasons. April 15, Arizona announced it hired long time Gonzaga assistant coach Tommy Lloyd.

=== Coaches ===
Note: Stats shown are before the beginning of the season. Overall and Pac-12 records are from time at current school.

Team	Head coach	Previous job	Seasons at school	Overall record	Pac-12 record	Pac-12 titles	NCAA tournaments	NCAA Final Fours	NCAA Championships
Arizona	Tommy Lloyd	Gonzaga (assistant)	1st	0–0 (–)	0–0 (–)	0	0	0	0
Arizona State	Bobby Hurley	Buffalo	6th	104–83 (.556)	50–57 (.467)	0	2	0	0
California	Mark Fox	Georgia	3rd	23–38 (.377)	10–28 (.263)	0	0	0	0
Colorado	Tad Boyle	Northern Colorado	12th	233–143 (.620)	98–84 (.538)	0	5	0	0
Oregon	Dana Altman	Creighton	12th	280–110 (.718)	132–66 (.667)	3	7	1	0
Oregon State	Wayne Tinkle	Montana	8th	113–109 (.509)	52–76 (.406)	1	2	0	0
Stanford	Jerod Haase	UAB	6th	82–74 (.526)	44–48 (.478)	0	0	0	0
UCLA	Mick Cronin	Cincinnati	3rd	41–22 (.651)	25–12 (.676)	0	1	1	0
USC	Andy Enfield	Florida Gulf Coast	9th	157–110 (.588)	70–75 (.483)	0	3	0	0
Utah	Craig Smith	Utah State	1st	0–0 (–)	0–0 (–)	0	0	0	0
Washington	Mike Hopkins	Syracuse (assistant)	5th	68–60 (.531)	34–40 (.459)	0	1	0	0
Washington State	Kyle Smith	San Francisco	3rd	30–29 (.508)	13–24 (.351)	0	0	0	0

Notes:

- Overall and Pac-12 records, conference titles, etc. are from time at current school and are through the end the 2020–21 season.
- NCAA tournament appearances are from time at current school only.
- NCAA Final Fours and Championship include time at other schools
- Conference titles refer to amount of tournament titles each coach has and not regular season titles.

== Postseason ==
=== Pac-12 tournament ===
The conference tournament is scheduled to be played from March 9–12, 2022, at the T-Mobile Arena, Paradise, NV. The top four teams had a bye on the first day. Teams were seeded by conference record, with ties broken by record between the tied teams followed by record against the regular-season champion, if necessary.

First round Wednesday, March 9
8	Arizona State	70
9	Stanford	71
5	Oregon	86
12	Oregon State	72
7	Washington State	66
10	California	59
6	Washington	82
11	Utah	70

Quarterfinals; Thursday, March 10
1	#2 Arizona	84
9	Stanford	80
4	Colorado	80
5	Oregon	69
2	#13 UCLA	75
7	Washington State	65
3	#21 USC	65
6	Washington	61

Semifinals; Friday, March 11
1	#2 Arizona	82
4	Colorado	72
2	#13 UCLA	69
3	#21 USC	59

Championship; Saturday, March 12
1	#2 Arizona	84
2	#13 UCLA	76

* denotes overtime period

=== NCAA tournament ===
Three teams from the conference were selected to participate: Arizona, UCLA, and USC

Seed	Region	School	First Four	First round	Second round	Sweet Sixteen	Elite Eight	Final Four	Championship
No. 1	South Region	Arizona	-	defeated No. 16 Wright State 87–70	defeated No. 9 TCU 85–80 ^{OT}	lost to No. 5 Houston 60–72	–	–	–
No. 4	East Region	UCLA	–	defeated No. 13 Akron 57–53	defeated No. 5 Saint Mary's 72–56	lost to No. 8 North Carolina 66–73	–	–	–
No. 7	Midwest Region	USC	–	lost to No. 10 Miami 66–68	–	–	–	–	–
	3 Bids	W-L (%):	0–0 (–)	2–1 (.667)	2–0 (1.000)	0–2 (.000)	0–0 (–)	0–0 (–)	TOTAL: 4–3 (.571)

=== National Invitation Tournament ===
Three teams from the conference were selected to participate: Colorado, Oregon, and Washington State.

Seed	Bracket	School	First round	Second round	Quarterfinals	Semifinals	Finals
No. 4	Oklahoma	Colorado	lost to No. 5 St. Bonaventure 68−76	−	−	−	−
No. 4	SMU	Washington State	defeated No. 5 Santa Clara 63−50	defeated No. 1 SMU 75−63	defeated No. 2 BYU 77−58	lost to No. 1 Texas A&M	−
No. 5	Texas A&M	Oregon	defeated No. 4 Utah State 83−72	lost to No. 1 Texas A&M 60−75	−	−	−
	3 Bid	W-L (%):	2–1 (.667)	1–1 (.500)	1–0 (1.000)	0–1 (.000)	TOTAL: 4–3 (.571)

Index to colors and formatting
Pac-12 member won
Pac-12 member lost

== Awards and honors ==
=== Players of the Week ===
Throughout the conference regular season, the Pac-12 offices named one or two players of the week each Monday.

Week	Player of the Week	School	Freshman of the Week	School	Ref.
Nov. 15	Johnny Juzang	UCLA	Harrison Ingram	Stanford	
Nov. 22	Christian Koloko	Arizona	Mouhamed Gueye	Washington State	
Nov. 29	Terrell Brown Jr.	Washington	K.J. Simpson	Colorado	
Dec. 6	Bennedict Mathurin	Arizona	Lazar Stefanovic	Utah	
Dec. 13	Bennedict Mathurin (2)	Arizona	Harrison Ingram (2)	Stanford	
Dec. 20	Chevez Goodwin	USC	Harrison Ingram (3)	Stanford	
Dec. 27	Grant Anticevich	California	Harrison Ingram (4)	Stanford	
Jan. 3	Will Richardson	Oregon	Glenn Taylor Jr.	Oregon State	
Jan. 10	Tyger Campbell	UCLA	Julian Hammond III	Colorado	
Jan. 17	Will Richardson (2)	Oregon	Mouhamed Gueye (2)	Washington State	
Jan. 24	Johnny Juzang (2)	UCLA	Lazar Stefanovic (2)	Utah	
Jan. 31	Terrell Brown Jr. (2)	Washington	Harrison Ingram (5)	Stanford	
Feb. 7	Ąžuolas Tubelis	Arizona	Mouhamed Gueye (3)	Washington State	
Feb. 14	Drew Peterson	USC	Harrison Ingram (6)	Stanford	
Feb. 21	Bennedict Mathurin (3)	Arizona	K.J. Simpson (2)	Colorado	
Feb. 28	Drew Peterson (2)	USC	Mouhamed Gueye (4)	Washington State	
Mar. 7	Jaime Jaquez Jr.	UCLA	Mouhamed Gueye (5)	Washington State	

==== Totals per School ====
School	Total
Stanford	6
Arizona	5
Washington State	5
UCLA	4
Colorado	3
USC	3
Oregon	2
Utah	2
Washington	2
California	1
Oregon State	1
Arizona State	0

=== National honors ===
==== All-Americans ====
- Bennedict Mathurin, Arizona, Consensus Second team (Associated Press, National Association of Basketball Coaches, Sporting News, United States Basketball Writers Association)
- Johnny Juzang, UCLA, Third team (National Association of Basketball Coaches)

==== Coach of the year ====
- Tommy Lloyd, Arizona (AP Coach of the Year, NABC Coach of the Year, USBWA Coach of the Year)

=== All-District ===
The United States Basketball Writers Association (USBWA) named the following from the Pac-12 to their All-District Teams:

District VIII

All-District Team

- Jabari Walker, Colorado

District IX

Coach of the Year

Tommy Lloyd, Arizona

All-District Team

- Terrell Brown Jr., Washington
- Johnny Juzang, UCLA
- Christian Koloko, Arizona
- Bennedict Mathurin, Arizona
- Isaiah Mobley, USC
- Will Richardson, Oregon
- Ąžuolas Tubelis, Arizona

The National Association of Basketball Coaches (NABC) named the following from the Pac-12 to their All-District Teams:

District 19

Coach of the Year

Tommy Lloyd, Arizona

All-District First Team

- Johnny Juzang – UCLA
- Bennedict Mathurin – Arizona
- Isaiah Mobley – USC
- Will Richardson – Oregon
- Ąžuolas Tubelis – Arizona

All-District Second Team

- Terrell Brown Jr. – Washington
- Tyger Campbell – UCLA
- Jaime Jaquez Jr. – UCLA
- Christian Koloko – Arizona
- Jabari Walker – Colorado

=== Conference awards ===
Voting was by conference coaches.

==== Individual awards ====
Pac-12 individual awards
Award	Recipient(s)
Player of The Year	Bennedict Mathurin, So., Arizona
Coach of the Year	Tommy Lloyd, Arizona
Defensive Player of The Year	Christian Koloko, Jr., Arizona
Freshman of The Year	Harrison Ingram, Fr., Stanford
Scholar-Athlete of the Year	Sam Beskind, RS Jr., Stanford
Most Improved Player of The Year	Christian Koloko, Jr., Arizona
Sixth Man of The Year	Pelle Larsson, So., Arizona

==== All-Pac-12 ====
First Team

Name	School	Pos.	Yr.	Ht., Wt.	Hometown (Last School)
Terrell Brown Jr.	Washington	PG	Gr.	6−3, 185	Seattle, Wash. (Garfield High School)
Tyger Campbell ††	UCLA	PG	R-Jr.	5−11, 180	Cedar Rapids, Iowa (La Lumiere School)
Jaime Jaquez Jr.	UCLA	SF	Jr.	6−7, 225	Camarillo, Calif. (Camarillo HS)
Johnny Juzang	UCLA	Jr.	Jr.	6−6, 210	Tarzana, Calif. (Harvard-Westlake School)
Christian Koloko	Arizona	C	Jr.	7−1, 230	Douala, Cameroon (Sierra Canyon)
Bennedict Mathurin ‡	Arizona	SG	So.	6−6, 210	Montreal, Canada (NBA Academy Latin America)
Isaiah Mobley	USC	PF	Sr.	6−10, 240	Murrieta, Calif. (Rancho Christian High School)
Drew Peterson	USC	SG	Sr.	6−6, 195	Libertyville, Ill. (Brother Rice High School)
Ąžuolas Tubelis	Arizona	PF	So.	6−11, 245	Vilnius, Lithuania (Rytas Vilnius)
Jabari Walker	Colorado	PF	So.	6−9, 215	Inglewood, Calif. (AZ Compass Prep)

- ‡ Pac-12 Player of the Year
- ††† three-time All-Pac-12 First Team honoree
- †† two-time All-Pac-12 First Team honoree
- † two-time All-Pac-12 honoree

Second Team

Name	School	Pos.	Yr.	Ht., Wt.	Hometown (Last School)
Evan Battey	Colorado	PF	Sr.	6−8, 259	Los Angeles, Calif. (Villa Park High School)
Branden Carlson	Utah	C	Sr.	6−9, 215	South Jordan, Utah (Bingham High School)
Michael Flowers	Washington State	PG	Gr.	6−1, 190	Southfield, Mich. (Southfield A&T High School)
Jalen Graham	Arizona State	PF	Jr.	6−9, 220	Phoenix, Ariz. (Mountain Pointe High School)
Will Richardson	Oregon	PG	Sr.	6−5, 180	Hinesville, Ga. (Oak Hill Academy)

Honorable Mention

- Boogie Ellis, (USC, PG)
- Harrison Ingram, (STAN, SF)
- Spencer Jones, (STAN, SF)
- Andre Kelly, (Cal, PF)
- Jordan Shepherd, (CAL, SG)
- Dalen Terry, (ARIZ, SG)

==== All-Freshman Team ====
Name	School	Pos.	Ht., Wt.
Mouhamed Gueye †	Washington State	PF	6−11, 210
Harrison Ingram ‡	Stanford	SF	6−7, 230
KJ Simpson	Colorado	PG	6−2, 177
Lazar Stefanovic	Utah	SG	6−7, 186
Glenn Taylor Jr.	Oregon State	SF	6−6, 200

† Pac-12 Player of the Year ‡ Pac-12 Freshman of the Year

Honorable Mention

- Sam Alajiki, CAL
- Peyton Watson, UCLA

==== All-Defensive Team ====
Name	School	Pos.	Yr.	Ht., Wt.
Jaylen Clark	UCLA	SG	So.	6−5, 210
Jaime Jaquez Jr. ††	UCLA	SF	Jr.	6−7, 225
Myles Johnson	UCLA	C	R-Sr.	6−10, 255
Christian Koloko ‡	Arizona	C	So.	7−1, 230
Dalen Terry	Arizona	SG	So.	6−7, 195

- † Pac-12 Player of the Year
- ‡ Pac-12 Defensive Player of the Year
- †† two-time Pac-12 All-Defensive Team honoree

Honorable Mention

- Efe Abogidi, (WSU, C)
- Evan Battey, (COLO, PF)
- Marreon Jackson, (ASU, SG)
- Spencer Jones, (STAN, SF)
- Franck Kepnang, (ORE, C)
- Isaiah Mobley, (USC, PF)

==== Scholar Athlete of the year ====
The Pac-12 moved to seasonal Academic Honor Rolls, discontinuing sport-by-sport teams, starting in 2019-20

Name	School	Pos.	Ht., Wt.	GPA	Major
Sam Beskind	Stanford	G	6'4”, 190	3.64	Management Science & Engineering

== 2022 NBA draft ==
Round	Pick	Player	Position	Nationality	Team	School
1	6	Bennedict Mathurin	SG	(Canada)	Indiana Pacers	Arizona (So.)
1	18	Dalen Terry	PG	(United States)	Chicago Bulls	Arizona (So.)
1	30	Peyton Watson	SF	(United States)	Oklahoma City Thunder	UCLA (Fr.)
2	33	Christian Koloko	C	(Cameroon)	Toronto Raptors	Arizona (Jr.)
2	49	Isaiah Mobley	PF	(United States)	Cleveland Cavaliers	USC (Jr.)
2	57	Jabari Walker	PF	(United States)	Portland Trail Blazers	Colorado (So.)

== Home game attendance ==
Team	Stadium	Capacity	Game 1	Game 2	Game 3	Game 4	Game 5	Game 6	Game 7	Game 8	Game 9	Game 10	Game 11	Game 12	Game 13	Game 14	Game 15	Game 16	Game 17	Game 18	Total	Average	% of Capacity
Arizona	McKale Center	14,655	12,421	11,862	12,059	11,733	13,077	11,943	14,263	12,496	13,515	14,164	**14,644†**	**14,644†**	**14,644†**	12,905	**14,644†**	14,382	**14,644†**		228,040	13,414	91.60%
Arizona State	Desert Financial Arena	14,100	6,912	7,594	6,977	6,793	11,391	6,403	7,548	6,482	7,246	9,135	13,233†	8,296	7,234	7,061	6,860				119,165	7,944	56.34%
California	Haas Pavilion	11,858	3,936	4,218	3,977	3,857	4,505	3,132	4,606	3,977	3,712	2,976	4,811	8,325†	7,582	4,038	4,361	4,396	4,248	8,773	85,430	4,746	49.02%
Colorado	Coors Events Center	11,064	6,931	7,115	5,633	6,221	8,688	5,782	6,388	5,888	5,543	6,145	7,475	8,774	7,611	6,918	7,988	7,211	11,079†		121,390	7,141	64.54%
Oregon	Matthew Knight Arena	12,364	7,037	8,164	5,739	5,739	6,130	5,251	7,682	5,350	5,655	6,378	6,176	10,712†	6,952	6,762	5,786	8,959	10,021		118,683	6,981	56.47%
Oregon State	Gill Coliseum	9,604	4,448	3,491	3,368	3,918	2,954	3,015	2,873	3,245	5,422†	3,833	3,180	3,684	3,060	3,685	4,584	3,888			58,648	3,666	38.17%
Stanford	Maples Pavilion	7,233	3,080	2,492	2,722	2,379	4,181	2,352	100	100	100	3,072	2,172	2,655	4,288†	2,437	3,263				35,393	2,360	32.62%
UCLA	Pauley Pavilion	13,800	5,618	13,659†	7,129	7,103	7,001	7,941	236	119	141	11,268	7,457	10,283	7,916	10,586	8,037	13,659†			118,153	7,385	53.51%
USC	Galen Center	10,258	3,321	2,189	3,754	2,608	5,561	3,253	0	0	2,438	4,148	4,293	2,189	10,258†	3,218	4,268	10,258†			61,756	3,860	37.63%
Utah	Jon M. Huntsman Center	15,000	2,355	6,805	6,638	11,443†	6,548	6,645	7,673	6,964	7,578	7,785	7,846	7,388	7,756	8,263	8,940	7,724			118,351	7,397	49.31%
Washington	Alaska Airlines Arena	10,000	6,356	6,297	5,315	5,670	5,703	6,084	5,618	5,448	6,627	5,593	7,729†	5,154	8,503	7,269	6,248	8,922	8,884		111,420	6,554	65.54%
Washington State	Beasley Coliseum	12,058	2,572	3,878	2,928	2,370	2,720	4,069	2,900	2,702	2,438	2,612	3,051	3,064	2,647	5,012†	3,394	4,510	3,099	4,169	58,135	3,230	26.78%
Total		11,833																			1,234,564	6,235	52.69%

Bold – At or exceed capacity
†Season high
