= Dalen Terry =

American basketball player (born 2002)

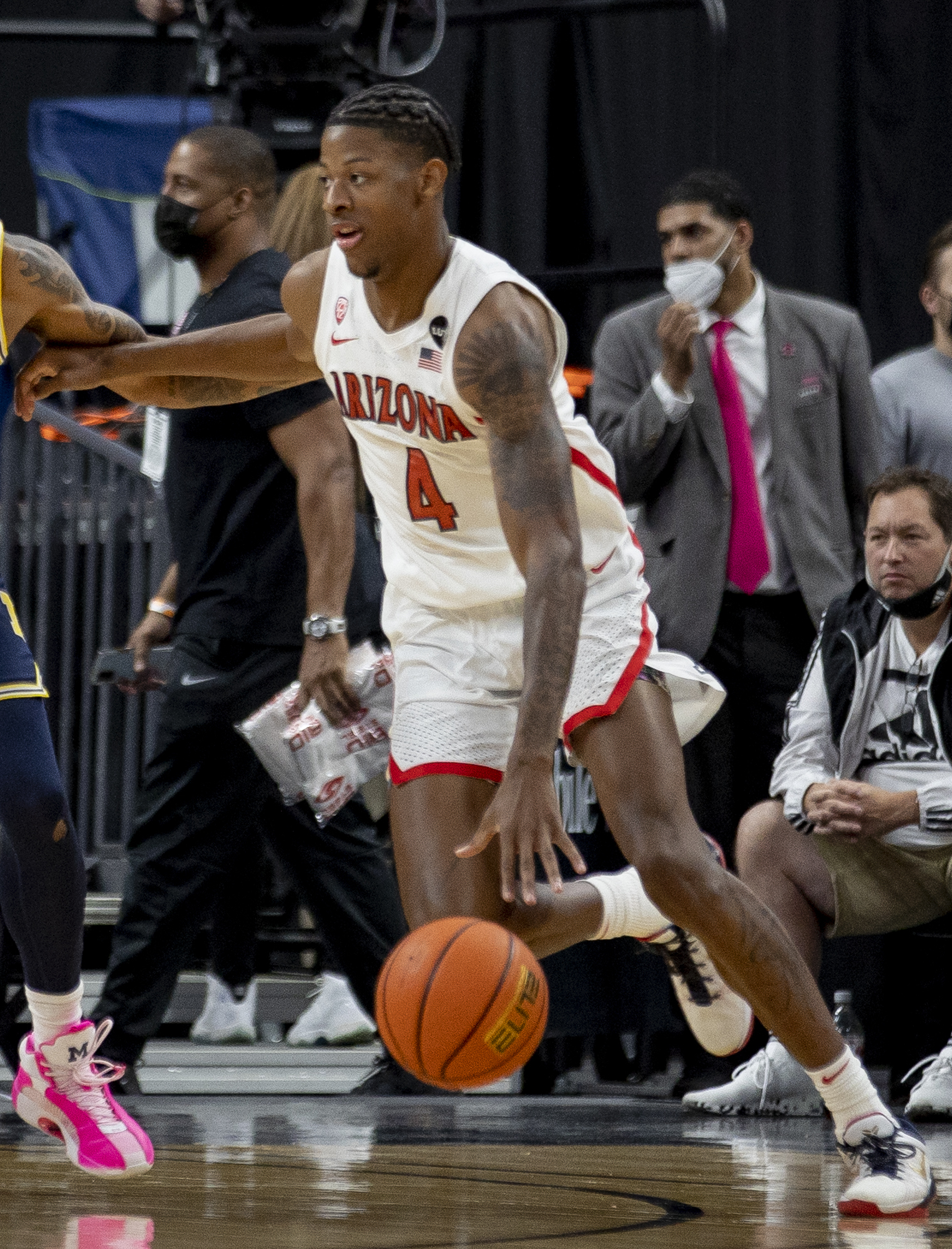
- Terry with the Arizona Wildcats in 2021

No. 21 – Santa Cruz Warriors
- Position: Small forward
- League: NBA G League

Personal information
- Born: July 12, 2002 (age 24) Phoenix, Arizona, U.S.
- Listed height: 6 ft 7 in (2.01 m)
- Listed weight: 208 lb (94 kg)

Career information
- High school: Corona del Sol (Tempe, Arizona); Hillcrest Prep (Phoenix, Arizona)
- College: Arizona (2020–2022)
- NBA draft: 2022: 1st round, 18th overall pick
- Drafted by: Chicago Bulls
- Playing career: 2022–present

Career history
- 2022–2026: Chicago Bulls
- 2022–2023: →Windy City Bulls
- 2026: Philadelphia 76ers
- 2026: →Delaware Blue Coats
- 2026: Oklahoma City Thunder
- 2026–present: Santa Cruz Warriors

Career highlights
- Pac-12 All-Defensive Team (2022)
- Stats at NBA.com
- Stats at Basketball Reference

Dalen Lee Terry (/ˈdeɪlən/ DAY-lən; born July 12, 2002) is an American professional basketball player for the Santa Cruz Warriors of the NBA G League. He played college basketball for the Arizona Wildcats, and was drafted with the 18th overall pick in the 2022 NBA draft. As a sophomore in 2022, Terry was named to the Pac-12 All-Defensive Team.

== High school career ==
Terry is a native of Phoenix, Arizona, and attended Corona del Sol High School in Tempe, Arizona, where he played with teammates Alex Barcello and Saben Lee before transferring to Hillcrest Prep in Phoenix. In two years at Hillcrest, Terry averaged 15.8 points, 7.4 rebounds, 10.3 assists, 3.7 steals and 1.9 blocks per game. He played his AAU basketball for the Compton Magic with other Pac-12 players such as Johnny Juzang, Isaiah Mobley, Evan Mobley and Onyeka Okongwu.

=== Recruiting ===
Terry was a consensus four-star recruit in the 2020 class and the No. 46 overall player, according to 247Sports. On July 23, 2019, he committed to playing college basketball for Arizona, being the first commit in the 2020 class for Arizona. Terry had offers from Arizona State, Arkansas, California, Colorado, USC, Utah and Vanderbilt, among others. He was joined in the 2020 recruiting class by Bennedict Mathurin, Ąžuolas Tubelis and Kerr Kriisa among others to give Arizona the Number 7 overall recruiting class for 2020.

College recruiting
Name	Hometown	School	Height	Weight	Commit date
Dalen Terry; SF	Phoenix, AZ	Hillcrest Prep (AZ)	6 ft 6 in (1.98 m)	190 lb (86 kg)	Jul 23, 2019
Dalen Terry; SF	Recruit ratings: Rivals: 247Sports: ESPN: (84)				
Overall recruit ranking: Rivals: 51 247Sports: 46 ESPN: 63
Note: In many cases, Scout, Rivals, 247Sports, On3, and ESPN may conflict in their listings of height and weight.; In these cases, the average was taken. ESPN grades are on a 100-point scale.; Sources: "Arizona 2020 Basketball Commitments". Rivals.; "2020 Arizona Wildcats Recruiting Class". ESPN.; "2020 Team Ranking". Rivals.

== College career ==
As a freshman at Arizona, Terry appeared in all 26 games for the Wildcats, starting 14 of them while averaging 4.6 points, 3.2 rebounds, 1.5 assists per game. His highest point total came against in-state rival Arizona State, scoring 13 points, while shooting 3-of-3 from three-point range. Arizona would be placed on self-imposed post season ban, thus Terry would not play in the 2021 Pac-12 tournament or the 2021 NCAA tournament.

In his sophomore season, Terry started all 37 games for the Wildcats, in which he averaged eight points, 4.8 rebounds, 3.9 assists and 1.2 steals per game. He finished second in the Pac-12 in assist-to-turnover ratio (2.84), sixth in assists per game (3.92), eighth in field goal percentage (50.2) and ninth in steals per game (1.24). He became one of the marquee defensive players in the conference earning him All-Defensive First Team. Terry helped Arizona to a 33–4 record, winning the 2021 Roman Main Event, Pac-12 Conference regular season and 2022 Pac-12 tournament titles. Arizona returned to the 2022 NCAA tournament for the first time since 2018. Terry scored a career-high 17 points in his final game as a Wildcat against Houston. On April 22, 2022, he declared for the 2022 NBA draft while maintaining his college eligibility. He later decided to remain in the draft.

== Professional career ==
=== Chicago Bulls (2022–2026) ===
Terry was selected by the Chicago Bulls with the 18th overall pick in the 2022 NBA draft. On July 8, 2022, he signed his rookie-scale contract with the Bulls. Terry made 38 appearances for Chicago during his rookie campaign, averaging 2.2 points, 1.0 rebound, and 0.6 assists.

Terry made 59 appearances (including two starts) for the Bulls in the 2023–24 NBA season, logging averages of 3.1 points, 1.9 rebounds, and 1.4 assists. He played in 73 games (starting five) for Chicago during the 2024–25 season, averaging 4.5 points, 1.7 rebounds, and 1.3 assists.

Terry made 34 appearances for the Bulls in the 2025–26 season, compiling averages of 3.5 points, 1.9 rebounds, and 1.3 assists.

=== Philadelphia 76ers (2026) ===
On February 5, 2026, Terry was traded to the New York Knicks in exchange for Guerschon Yabusele. Later, on the same day, Terry was traded to the New Orleans Pelicans in exchange for Jose Alvarado. The next day, the Pelicans waived Terry.

On February 10, 2026, Terry signed with the Philadelphia 76ers on a two-way contract. On April 10, the 76ers signed him to a two–year, standard NBA contract worth $2.7 million. Terry made 14 total appearances for Philadelphia, recording averages of 4.1 points, 1.6 rebounds, and 1.6 assists. However, on July 26, the 76ers waived Terry to free up roster spots needed to sign LeBron James and Kentavious Caldwell-Pope.

=== Oklahoma City Thunder / Santa Cruz Warriors (2026–present) ===
On August 27, 2026, the Golden State Warriors signed Terry to an Exhibit 10 contract.

On November 4, 2026, Terry signed with the Oklahoma City Thunder standard two-year contract, but on November 8, 2026, the Oklahoma City Thunder waived Terry.

== Career statistics ==
Legend
GP	Games played	GS	Games started	MPG	Minutes per game
FG%	Field goal percentage	3P%	3-point field goal percentage	FT%	Free throw percentage
RPG	Rebounds per game	APG	Assists per game	SPG	Steals per game
BPG	Blocks per game	PPG	Points per game	**Bold**	Career high

=== NBA ===
==== Regular season ====
Year	Team	GP	GS	MPG	FG%	3P%	FT%	RPG	APG	SPG	BPG	PPG
2022–23	Chicago	38	0	5.6	.444	.259	.667	1.0	.6	.3	.1	2.2
2023–24	Chicago	59	2	11.5	.439	.230	.581	**1.9**	1.4	.5	**.3**	3.1
2024–25	Chicago	**73**	**5**	**13.5**	**.448**	.356	**.710**	1.7	1.3	**.6**	.2	**4.5**
2025–26	Chicago	34	0	11.1	.441	**.413**	.529	**1.9**	1.3	**.6**	**.3**	3.5
2025–26	Philadelphia	14	0	12.4	.434	.250	.538	1.6	**1.6**	.5	**.3**	4.1
Career		218	7	11.2	.443	.314	.638	1.7	1.2	.5	.2	3.5

==== Playoffs ====
Year	Team	GP	GS	MPG	FG%	3P%	FT%	RPG	APG	SPG	BPG	PPG
2026	Philadelphia	7	0	5.6	.308	.400	.429	.6	1.0	.7	.0	1.9
Career		7	0	5.6	.308	.400	.429	.6	1.0	.7	.0	1.9

=== College ===
Year	Team	GP	GS	MPG	FG%	3P%	FT%	RPG	APG	SPG	BPG	PPG
2020–21	Arizona	26	14	20.7	.415	.326	.614	3.2	1.5	.7	**.4**	4.6
2021–22	Arizona	**37**	**37**	**27.8**	**.502**	**.364**	**.736**	**4.8**	**3.9**	**1.2**	.3	**8.0**
Career		63	51	24.9	.477	.350	.680	4.2	2.9	1.0	.3	6.6
