= 2022 Pac-12 Conference men's basketball tournament =

- Classification: Division I
- Season: 2021–22
- Teams: 12
- Site: T-Mobile Arena; Paradise, Nevada
- Champions: Arizona Wildcats (8th title)
- Winning coach: Tommy Lloyd (1st title)
- MVP: Bennedict Mathurin (Arizona Wildcats)
- Attendance: 118,001
- Top scorer: Jaime Jaquez Jr. (UCLA) (60 points)
- Television: Pac-12 Network; FS1, FOX

2021–22 Pac-12 Conference men's basketball standings
	Conf.				Overall
Team	W		L	PCT	W		L	PCT
No. 2 Arizona †	18	–	2	.900	33	–	4	.892
No. 11 UCLA	15	–	5	.750	27	–	8	.771
No. 22 USC	14	–	6	.700	26	–	8	.765
Colorado	12	–	8	.600	21	–	12	.636
Oregon	11	–	9	.550	20	–	15	.571
Washington	11	–	9	.550	17	–	15	.531
Washington State	11	–	9	.550	22	–	15	.595
Arizona State	10	–	10	.500	14	–	17	.452
Stanford	8	–	12	.400	16	–	16	.500
California	5	–	15	.250	12	–	20	.375
Utah	4	–	16	.200	11	–	20	.355
Oregon State	1	–	19	.050	3	–	28	.097
† Conference tournament winner Rankings from AP poll

The 2022 Pac-12 Conference men's basketball tournament was a postseason men's basketball tournament for the Pac-12 Conference held March 9–12, 2022, at T-Mobile Arena on the Las Vegas Strip in Paradise, Nevada. The tournament winner, the Arizona Wildcats, received the conference's automatic bid to the NCAA tournament.

== Seeds ==
The bracket was set on March 5, 2022 All 12 schools were scheduled to participate in the tournament. The seedings were determined upon completion of regular season play. The winning percentage of the teams in conference play determined tournament seedings. There are tiebreakers in place to seed teams with identical conference records. The top four teams receive a bye to the quarterfinals. Tie-breaking procedures for determining all tournament seeding is:

- For two-team tie

1. Results of head-to-head competition during the regular season.

2. Each team's record (won-lost percentage) vs. the team occupying the highest position in the final regular standings, and then continuing down through the standings until one team gains an advantage. When arriving at another group of tied teams while comparing records, use each team's record (won-lost percentage) against the collective tied teams as a group (prior to that group's own tie-breaking procedure), rather than the performance against individual tied teams.

3. Won-lost percentage against all Division I opponents.

4. Coin toss conducted by the Commissioner or designee.

- For multiple-team tie

1. Results (won-lost percentage) of collective head-to-head competition during the regular season among the tied teams.

2. If more than two teams are still tied, each of the tied team's record (won-lost percentage) vs. the team occupying the highest position in the final regular season standings, and then continuing down through the standings, eliminating teams with inferior records, until one team gains an advantage.

When arriving at another group of tied teams while comparing records, use each team's record (won-lost percentage) against the collective tied teams as a group (prior to that group's own tie-breaking procedure), rather than the performance against individual tied teams.

After one team has an advantage and is seeded, all remaining teams in the multiple-team tie-breaker will repeat the multiple-team tie-breaking procedure.

If at any point the multiple-team tie is reduced to two teams, the two-team tie-breaking procedure will be applied.

3. Won-lost percentage against all Division I opponents.

4. Coin toss conducted by the Commissioner or designee.

Seed	School	Conference	Overall	Tiebreak 1	Tiebreak 2	Tiebreak 3	Tiebreak 4	Tiebreak 5
1	No. 2 Arizona †#	18–2	28–3					
2	No. 13 UCLA #	15–5	23–6					
3	No. 21 USC #	14–6	25–6					
4	Colorado #	12–8	20–10					
5	Oregon	11–9	18–13	1–1 vs Washington, 1–1 vs Washington State	0-1 vs Arizona	2–0 vs UCLA		
6	Washington	11–9	16–14	1–1 vs Oregon, 1–1 vs Washington State	0-2 vs Arizona	0–2 vs UCLA	0–1 vs USC	1–0 vs ASU
7	Washington State	11–9	18–13	1–1 vs Oregon, 1–1 vs Washington	0-2 vs Arizona	0–1 vs UCLA	0–2 vs USC	1–1 vs ASU
8	Arizona State	10–10	14–16					
9	Stanford	8–12	15–15					
10	California	5–15	12–19					
11	Utah	4–16	11–19					
12	Oregon State	1–19	3–27					
† – Pac-12 Conference regular season champions # – Received a first round bye in the conference tournament. Rankings from AP poll

== Schedule ==
Game	Time	Matchup	Score	Television	Attendance
First round – Wednesday, March 9
1	12:00 p.m.	No. 8 Arizona State vs. No. 9 Stanford	70−71	Pac-12 Network	7,565
2	2:30 p.m.	No. 5 Oregon vs. No. 12 Oregon State	86−72	Pac-12 Network	7,565
3	6:00 p.m.	No. 7 Washington State vs. No. 10 California	66–59	Pac-12 Network	8,579
4	8:30 p.m.	No. 6 Washington vs. No. 11 Utah	82–70	Pac-12 Network	8,579
Quarterfinals – Thursday, March 10
5	12:00 p.m.	No. 1 Arizona vs. No. 9 Stanford	84–80	Pac-12 Network	11,081
6	2:30 p.m.	No. 4 Colorado vs. No. 5 Oregon	80–69	Pac-12 Network	11,081
7	6:00 p.m.	No. 2 UCLA vs. No. 7 Washington State	75–65	Pac-12 Network	10,417
8	8:30 p.m.	No. 3 USC vs. No. 6 Washington	65–61	FS1	10,417
Semifinals – Friday, March 11
9	6:00 p.m.	No. 1 Arizona vs. No. 4 Colorado	82–72	Pac-12 Network	14,158
10	8:30 p.m.	No. 2 UCLA vs. No. 3 USC	69–59	FS1	14,158
Championship – Saturday, March 12
11	6:00 p.m.	No. 1 Arizona vs. No. 2 UCLA	84–76	FOX	14,401
Game times in PT. Rankings denote tournament seed.

== Bracket ==
First round Wednesday, March 9
8	Arizona State	70
9	Stanford	71
5	Oregon	86
12	Oregon State	72
7	Washington State	66
10	California	59
6	Washington	82
11	Utah	70

Quarterfinals; Thursday, March 10
1	#2 Arizona	84
9	Stanford	80
4	Colorado	80
5	Oregon	69
2	#13 UCLA	75
7	Washington State	65
3	#21 USC	65
6	Washington	61

Semifinals; Friday, March 11
1	#2 Arizona	82
4	Colorado	72
2	#13 UCLA	69
3	#21 USC	59

Championship; Saturday, March 12
1	#2 Arizona	84
2	#13 UCLA	76

* denotes overtime period

== Game statistics ==
=== First round ===
Pac-12 Network

March 9
12:00 p.m.

No. 8 Arizona State 70, No. 9 Stanford 71
Scoring by half: 31−27, 39−44
Pts: Horne, 21; Rebs: Graham, 6 Asts: Jackson, 4	Pts: Jones, 26; Rebs: 2 tied, 10; Asts: O'Connell, 7

T-Mobile Arena
Paradise, NV
Attendance: 7,565
Referees: Greg Nixon, Deldre Carr, Deron White

Pac-12 Network

March 9
2:30 p.m.

No. 5 Oregon 86, No. 12 Oregon State 72
Scoring by half: 43−36, 43−36
Pts: Young, 23; Rebs: Williams, 8 Asts: Young, 11	Pts: Lucas, 22; Rebs: 2 tied, 5 Asts: Davis, 5

T-Mobile Arena
Paradise, NV
Attendance: 7,565
Referees: Chris Rastatter, Mike Scyphers, Glen Mayberry

Pac-12 Network

March 9
6:00 p.m.

No. 7 Washington State 66, No. 10 California 59
Scoring by half: 32−20, 34–39
Pts: Abogidi, 19; Rebs: Jakimovski, 10; Asts: 2 tied, 2	Pts: Shepherd, 19; Rebs: Thiemann, 10; Asts: Foreman, 3

T-Mobile Arena
Paradise, NV
Attendance: 8,579
Referees: Dave Hall, Eric Curry, DG Nelson

Pac-12 Network

March 9
8:30 p.m.

No. 6 Washington 82, No. 11 Utah 70
Scoring by half: 40–37, 42–33
Pts: Brown, 22; Rebs: Roberts, 11; Asts: Brown, 5	Pts: Anthony, 18; Rebs: Worster, 8 Asts: Worster, 6

T-Mobile Arena
Paradise, NV
Attendance: 8,579
Referees: Michael Irving, Verne Harris, Frank Harvey III

=== Quarterfinals ===
Pac-12 Network

March 10
12:00 p.m.

No. 1 Arizona 84, No. 9 Stanford 80
Scoring by half: 40−37, 44−43
Pts: Koloko, 24; Rebs: Koloko, 9 Asts: 2 tied, 5	Pts: Jones, 28; Rebs: Jones, 8 Asts: 2 tied, 4

T-Mobile Arena
Paradise, NV
Attendance: 11,081
Referees: Randy McCall, Frank Harvey III, Larry Spaulding

Pac-12 Network

March 10
2:30 p.m.

No. 4 Colorado 80, No. 5 Oregon 69
Scoring by half: 36−30, 44−39
Pts: Battey, 19; Rebs: Walker, 16; Asts: Simpson, 4	Pts: Guerrier, 25; Rebs: Guerrier, 13; Asts: Young, 7

T-Mobile Arena
Paradise, NV
Attendance: 11,081
Referees: Michael Greenstein, Michael Irving, Nate Harris

Pac-12 Network

March 10
6:00 p.m.

No. 2 UCLA 75, No. 7 Washington State 65
Scoring by half: 40−28, 35–37
Pts: Jaquez, 23; Rebs: Jaquez, 11; Asts: 2 tied, 4	Pts: Jakimovski, 15; Rebs: Abogidi, 8 Asts: 2 tied, 3

T-Mobile Arena
Paradise, NV
Attendance: 10,417
Referees: Tony Padilla, Mike Reed, Glen Mayberry

FS1

March 10
8:30 p.m.

No. 3 USC 65, No. 6 Washington 61
Scoring by half: 36−39, 29–22
Pts: Ellis, 17; Rebs: Mobley, 9 Asts: Mobley, 6	Pts: Brown, 23; Rebs: 2 tied, 6 Asts: Brown, 5

T-Mobile Arena
Paradise, NV
Attendance: 10,417
Referees: Chris Rastatter, Deron White, Scott Brown

=== Semifinals ===
Pac-12 Network

March 11
6:00 p.m.

No. 1 Arizona 82, No. 4 Colorado 72
Scoring by half: 47–38, 35–34
Pts: Tubelis, 20; Rebs: Tubelis, 11; Asts: 4 tied, 3	Pts: Walker, 19; Rebs: Walker, 5 Asts: Simpson, 5

T-Mobile Arena
Paradise, NV
Attendance: 14,158
Referees: Verne Harris, Tony Padilla, Mike Reed

FS1

March 11
8:30 p.m.

No. 2 UCLA 69, No. 3 USC 59
Scoring by half: 36–28, 33–31
Pts: Jaquez, 19; Rebs: Bernard, 8 Asts: 4 tied, 2	Pts: Ellis, 27; Rebs: 2 tied, 7 Asts: 6 tied, 1

T-Mobile Arena
Paradise, NV
Attendance: 14,158
Referees: Randy McCall, Deldre Carr, Mike Greenstein

=== Championship ===
FOX

March 12
6:00 p.m.

No. 1 Arizona 84, No. 2 UCLA 76
Scoring by half: 35−40, 49–36
Pts: Mathurin, 27; Rebs: Koloko, 10; Asts: 2 tied, 7	Pts: Bernard, 19; Rebs: Jaquez, 10; Asts: Campbell, 4

T-Mobile Arena
Paradise, NV
Attendance: 14,401
Referees: Randy McCall, Verne Harris, Tony Padilla

== Awards and honors ==
=== Hall of Honor ===
The 2022 class of the Pac-12 Hall of Honor will be honored on March 11 during a ceremony prior to the tournament semifinals. Following a hiatus in 2021 due to the COVID-19 pandemic, the 2022 class will return to the original format of recognizing one member as a new inductee to the Hall of Honor from each Pac-12 university. The 2022 class includes:

- Tanya Hughes (Arizona Women's Track & Field)
- Curley Culp (Arizona State Football & Men's Wrestling)
- Layshia Clarendon (California Women's Basketball)
- Jenny Simpson (Colorado Women's Cross Country and Track & Field)
- English Gardner (Oregon Women's Track & Field)
- Steven Jackson (Oregon State Football)
- Tony Azevedo (Stanford Men's Water Polo)
- Jackie Joyner-Kersee (UCLA Women's Basketball and Track & Field)
- John Naber (USC Men's Swimming)
- Tom Chambers (Utah Men's Basketball)
- Tina Frimpong Ellertson (Washington Women's Soccer)
- Drew Bledsoe (Washington State Football).

=== Team and tournament leaders ===
Team	Points		Rebounds		Assists		Steals		Blocks		Minutes	
Arizona	Mathurin	57	Koloko	23	Mathurin	15	2 tied	5	Ballo	7	Mathurin	107
Arizona State	Horne	21	Graham	6	Jackson	4	Jackson	2	Boakye	3	Heath	32
California	Shepherd	19	Thiemann	10	Foreman	3	Shepherd	4	Thiemann	1	Shepherd	39
Colorado	Walker	37	Walker	21	Simpson	11	Simpson	5	2 tied	3	Walker	63
Oregon	Guerrier	45	Dante	18	Young	18	Young	5	2 tied	5	Young	76
Oregon State	Lucas	22	2 tied	5	Davis	5	5 tied	1	Rand	2	Lucas	39
Stanford	Jones	54	Ingram	16	O'Connell	11	Silva	3	Keefe	3	Ingram	67
UCLA	Jaquez	60	Jaquez	26	Campbell	10	Jaquez	5	Johnson	4	Jaquez	106
USC	Ellis	44	Mobley	16	Mobley	7	Goodwin	2	Mobley	2	Mobley	74
Utah	Anthony	18	Worster	8	Worster	6	3 tied	1	Carlson	2	Anthony	37
Washington	Brown	45	Roberts	17	Brown	10	Brown	5	3 tied	1	Brown	75
Washington State	Roberts	28	Jakimovski	14	Flowers	5	2 tied	2	Jackson	6	Flowers	68

=== All-Tournament Team ===
Name	Pos.	Height	Weight	Year	Team
Bennedict Mathurin	SG	6−6	210	So.	Arizona
Christian Koloko	C	7−1	230	Jr.	Arizona
Jaime Jaquez Jr.	SF	6−7	225	Jr.	UCLA
Jules Bernard	SG	6−7	210	Sr.	UCLA
Boogie Ellis	PG	6−3	185	Jr.	USC
Spencer Jones	SF	6−7	225	Jr.	Stanford

=== Most Outstanding Player ===
Name	Pos.	Height	Weight	Year	Team
Bennedict Mathurin	SG	6'6"	210	So.	Arizona

== Tournament notes ==
- At the start of the tournament, No. 2 Arizona, No. 13 UCLA, and No. 21 USC were ranked in the top 25.
- Three teams were extended invitations to the 2022 NCAA tournament: Arizona, UCLA & USC.
- Three teams were extended invitations to the 2022 National Invitation Tournament: Colorado, Oregon & Washington State.

== See also ==
- 2022 Pac-12 Conference women's basketball tournament
