= 2021–22 Stanford Cardinal men's basketball team =

College basketball team season

2021–22 Stanford Cardinal men's basketball
- Conference: Pac-12 Conference
- Record: 16–16 (8–12 Pac-12)
- Head coach: Jerod Haase (6th season)
- Assistant coaches: Adam Cohen; Jesse Pruitt; Robert Ehsan
- Home arena: Maples Pavilion

2021–22 Pac-12 Conference men's basketball standings
	Conf.				Overall
Team	W		L	PCT	W		L	PCT
No. 2 Arizona †	18	–	2	.900	33	–	4	.892
No. 11 UCLA	15	–	5	.750	27	–	8	.771
No. 22 USC	14	–	6	.700	26	–	8	.765
Colorado	12	–	8	.600	21	–	12	.636
Oregon	11	–	9	.550	20	–	15	.571
Washington	11	–	9	.550	17	–	15	.531
Washington State	11	–	9	.550	22	–	15	.595
Arizona State	10	–	10	.500	14	–	17	.452
Stanford	8	–	12	.400	16	–	16	.500
California	5	–	15	.250	12	–	20	.375
Utah	4	–	16	.200	11	–	20	.355
Oregon State	1	–	19	.050	3	–	28	.097
† Conference tournament winner Rankings from AP poll

The 2021–22 Stanford Cardinal men's basketball team represented Stanford University during the 2021–22 NCAA Division I men's basketball season. The Cardinal were led by sixth-year head coach Jerod Haase, and competed as a member of the Pac-12 Conference. They played their home games at Maples Pavilion.

== Previous season ==
The Cardinal finished the 2020–21 season 14–13 and 10–10 in Pac-12 play to finish in a tie for seventh place. They lost in the first round of the Pac-12 tournament to California.

== Offseason ==
=== Departures ===
Stanford departures
Name	Number	Pos.	Height	Weight	Year	Hometown	Reason for departure
Daejon Davis	1	G	6'3"	190	Senior	Seattle, WA	Graduated; transferred to Washington
Bryce Wills	2	G	6'6"	205	Junior	White Plains, NY	Declared for 2021 NBA draft
Ziaire Williams	3	F	6'8"	185	Freshman	Lancaster, CA	Declared for 2021 NBA draft; selected 10th overall by the New Orleans Pelicans
Oscar da Silva	13	F	6'9"	230	Senior	Munich, Germany	Graduated; signed to play professionally in Germany with Riesen Ludwigsburg

=== 2021 recruiting class ===
College recruiting
Name	Hometown	School	Height	Weight	Commit date
Harrison Ingram #4 SF	Dallas, TX	St. Mark's School (TX)	6 ft 7 in (2.01 m)	210 lb (95 kg)	Sep 18, 2020
Harrison Ingram #4 SF	Recruit ratings: Rivals: 247Sports: ESPN: (90)				
Isa Silva #11 PG	Sacramento, CA	Prolific Prep (CA)	6 ft 3 in (1.91 m)	185 lb (84 kg)	Apr 21, 2020
Isa Silva #11 PG	Recruit ratings: Rivals: 247Sports: ESPN: (85)				
Jarvis Moss; SG	Concord, NC	Cannon School (NC)	6 ft 4 in (1.93 m)	170 lb (77 kg)	Feb 5, 2021
Jarvis Moss; SG	Recruit ratings: Rivals: 247Sports: ESPN: (75)				
Maxime Raynaud; C	France	N/A	7 ft 0 in (2.13 m)	200 lb (91 kg)	May 14, 2021
Maxime Raynaud; C	Recruit ratings: Rivals: 247Sports: ESPN: (0)				
Overall recruit ranking: Rivals: 12 247Sports: 20 ESPN: —
Note: In many cases, Scout, Rivals, 247Sports, On3, and ESPN may conflict in their listings of height and weight.; In these cases, the average was taken. ESPN grades are on a 100-point scale.; Sources: "Stanford 2021 Basketball Commitments". Rivals.; "2021 Stanford Cardinal Recruiting Class". ESPN.; "2021 Team Ranking". Rivals.

=== 2022 recruiting class ===
College recruiting (2022)
Name	Hometown	School	Height	Weight	Commit date
Ryan Agarwala #30 SF	Coppell, TX	Coppell High School	6 ft 5 in (1.96 m)	175 lb (79 kg)	Sep 18, 2020
Ryan Agarwala #30 SF	Recruit ratings: Rivals: 247Sports: ESPN: (82)				
Overall recruit ranking: Rivals: 12 247Sports: 30 ESPN: —
Note: In many cases, Scout, Rivals, 247Sports, On3, and ESPN may conflict in their listings of height and weight.; In these cases, the average was taken. ESPN grades are on a 100-point scale.; Sources: "Stanford 2022 Basketball Commitments". Rivals.; "2022 Stanford Cardinal Recruiting Class". ESPN.; "2022 Team Ranking". Rivals.

== Roster ==
2021–22 Stanford Cardinal men's basketball team
Players
Coaches

Pos.	#	Name	Height	Weight	Year	Previous school	Hometown
F	0	Neal Begovich	6 ft 9 in (2.06 m)	230 lb (104 kg)	RS So	St. Ignatius College Prep	San Francisco, CA
G	1	Isa Silva	6 ft 4 in (1.93 m)	190 lb (86 kg)	Fr	Jesuit	Sacramento, CA
G	3	Jarvis Moss	6 ft 4 in (1.93 m)	190 lb (86 kg)	Fr	Cannon School	Concord, NC
G	5	Michael O'Connell	6 ft 2 in (1.88 m)	190 lb (86 kg)	So	Blair Academy	Mineola, NY
F	10	Max Murrell	6 ft 9 in (2.06 m)	225 lb (102 kg)	So	Millard North	Omaha, NE
F	11	Jaiden Delaire	6 ft 9 in (2.06 m)	215 lb (98 kg)	Sr	Loomis Chaffee School	North Granby, CT
C	12	Keenan Fitzmorris	7 ft 0 in (2.13 m)	235 lb (107 kg)	RS Jr	New Hampton School	Overland Park, KS
F	14	Spencer Jones	6 ft 7 in (2.01 m)	225 lb (102 kg)	Jr	Bishop Miege	Roeland Park, KS
G	20	Noah Taitz	6 ft 3 in (1.91 m)	185 lb (84 kg)	So	Bishop Gorman	Las Vegas, NV
G	21	Daniel Begovich	6 ft 5 in (1.96 m)	215 lb (98 kg)	GS	St. Ignatius College Prep	San Francisco, CA
F	22	James Keefe	6 ft 9 in (2.06 m)	235 lb (107 kg)	Jr	Loyola	Los Angeles, CA
F	23	Brandon Angel	6 ft 8 in (2.03 m)	230 lb (104 kg)	So	Torrey Pines	San Diego, CA
G	24	Sam Beskind	6 ft 4 in (1.93 m)	190 lb (86 kg)	RS Jr	Catalina Foothills	Tucson, AZ
F	32	Lukas Kišūnas	6 ft 10 in (2.08 m)	265 lb (120 kg)	Sr	Brewster Academy	Vilnius, Lithuania
F	42	Maxime Raynaud	7 ft 1 in (2.16 m)	240 lb (109 kg)	Fr	Lycée Henri-IV	Paris, France
F	55	Harrison Ingram	6 ft 7 in (2.01 m)	230 lb (104 kg)	Fr	St. Mark's	Dallas, TX

Head coach

- Jerod Haase (Kansas)

Assistant coach(es)

- Adam Cohen (Arizona)
- Jesse Pruitt (UC Davis)
- Robert Ehsan (UC Davis)

Legend

- (C) Team captain
- (S) Suspended
- (I) Ineligible
- (W) Walk-on
- Injured
- Current redshirt

Roster

== Schedule and results ==
Date time, TV	Rank^{#}	Opponent^{#}	Result	Record	High points	High rebounds	High assists	Site (attendance) city, state
Regular season
November 9, 2021*; 7:00 pm, P12N		Tarleton State	W 62–50	1–0	16 – Ingram	7 – Ingram	4 – Silva	Maples Pavilion (3,080); Stanford, CA
November 12, 2021*; 8:00 pm, CBSSN		at Santa Clara	L 72–88	1–1	19 – Ingram	10 – Raynaud	4 – Tied	Leavey Center (2,181); Santa Clara, CA
November 15, 2021*; 8:00 pm, P12N		San Jose State	W 76–62	2–1	19 – Tied	11 – Ingram	6 – Ingram	Maples Pavilion (2,492); Stanford, CA
November 17, 2021*; 5:30 pm, P12N		Valparaiso	W 74–60	3–1	11 – Taitz	5 – Jones	5 – Tied	Maples Pavilion (2,722); Stanford, CA
November 20, 2021*; 10:00 am, ESPN+		at No. 9 Baylor	L 48–86	3–2	10 – Tied	9 – Ingram	2 – Tied	Ferrell Center (7,048); Waco, TX
November 23, 2021*; 7:00 pm, P12N		North Carolina A&T	W 79–65	4–2	18 – Murrell	10 – Ingram	5 – O'Connell	Maples Pavilion (2,379); Stanford, CA
November 28, 2021; 4:00 pm, P12N		at Colorado	L 76–80	4–3 (0–1)	15 – Jones	9 – Kisunas	5 – Tied	CU Events Center (6,221); Boulder, CO
December 12, 2021; 4:00 pm, P12N		Oregon	W 72–69	5–3 (1–1)	20 – Delaire	8 – Tied	5 – Ingram	Maples Pavilion (4,181); Stanford, CA
December 16, 2021*; 7:00 pm, P12N		Dartmouth	W 89–78 ^{OT}	6–3	22 – Delaire	9 – Keefe	4 – Tied	Maples Pavilion (2,352); Stanford, CA
December 19, 2021*; 12:00 pm, ABC		vs. No. 17 Texas; Pac-12 Coast-to-Coast Challenge	L 53–60	6–4	15 – Ingram	7 – Ingram	3 – Tied	T-Mobile Arena; Paradise, NV
December 22, 2021*; 2:30 pm, ESPNU		vs. Wyoming; Diamond Head Classic Quarterfinals	W 66–63	7–4	17 – Delaire	7 – Tied	5 – O'Connell	Stan Sheriff Center (4,041); Honolulu, HI
December 23, 2021*; 1:00 pm, ESPN2		vs. Liberty; Diamond Head Classic Semifinals	W 79–76	8–4	25 – Jones	8 – Delaire	8 – O’Connell	Stan Sheriff Center; Honolulu, HI
December 25, 2021*; 5:30 pm, ESPN2		vs. Vanderbilt; Diamond Head Classic Championship	Canceled due to COVID-19 protocols within the Stanford program.					Stan Sheriff Center; Honolulu, HI
January 11, 2022; 2:00 pm, ESPN2		No. 5 USC	W 75–69	9–4 (2–1)	21 – Tied	10 – Ingram	7 – O'Connell	Maples Pavilion (100); Stanford, CA
January 13, 2022; 2:00 p.m., ESPNU		at Washington State	W 62–57	10–4 (3–1)	16 – Jones	6 – Keefe	4 – O'Connell	Beasley Coliseum (2,612); Pullman, WA
January 15, 2022; 3:00 p.m., P12N		at Washington	L 64–67	10–5 (3–2)	13 – Angel	12 – Kisunas	3 – Delaire	Alaska Airlines Arena (6,627); Seattle, WA
January 20, 2022; 8:00 p.m., ESPNU		No. 3 Arizona	L 57–85	10–6 (3–3)	9 – Tied	7 – Ingram	3 – O'Connell	Maples Pavilion (100); Stanford, CA
January 22, 2022; 8:00 p.m., FS1		Arizona State	W 79–76	11–6 (4–3)	16 – Tied	10 – Ingram	3 – Tied	Maples Pavilion (100); Stanford, CA
January 27, 2022; 8:00 p.m., FS1		at No. 15 USC	W 64–61	12–6 (5–3)	14 – Delaire	6 – Keefe	5 – Ingram	Galen Center (4,148); Los Angeles, CA
January 29, 2022; 6:30 p.m., P12N		at No. 7 UCLA	L 43–66	12–7 (5–4)	8 – Silva	6 – Angel	3 – O’Connell	Pauley Pavilion (10,283); Los Angeles, CA
February 1, 2022; 7:00 pm, P12N		California	W 57–50	13–7 (6–4)	12 – Tied	11 – Keefe	3 – O'Connell	Maples Pavilion (3,072); Stanford, CA
February 3, 2022; 6:00 p.m., P12N		Washington State	L 60–66	13–8 (6–5)	24 – Jones	10 – Keefe	3 – Keefe	Maples Pavilion (2,172); Stanford, CA
February 6, 2022; 1:00 p.m., ESPNU		Washington	W 87–69	14–8 (7–5)	18 – Delaire	10 – Ingram	6 – O'Connell	Maples Pavilion (2,655); Stanford, CA
February 8, 2022; 8:00 p.m., ESPN2		No. 12 UCLA	L 70–79	14–9 (7–6)	22 – Jones	8 – Ingram	4 – O'Connell	Maples Pavilion (4,288); Stanford, CA
February 10, 2022; 6:00 p.m., ESPN2		at Oregon	L 60–68	14–10 (7–7)	11 – Tied	10 – Angel	4 – Ingram	Matthew Knight Arena (6,952); Eugene, OR
February 12, 2022; 7:30 p.m., P12N		at Oregon State	W 76–65	15–10 (8–7)	16 – Ingram	8 – Jones	9 – Ingram	Gill Coliseum (3,684); Corvallis, OR
February 17, 2022; 8:00 p.m., ESPNU		Utah	L 56–69	15–11 (8–8)	11 – Tied	8 – Keefe	6 – Ingram	Maples Pavilion (2,437); Stanford, CA
February 19, 2021; 7:00 p.m., ESPNU		Colorado	L 53–70	15–12 (8–9)	12 – Delaire	9 – Keefe	2 – Tied	Maples Pavilion (3,263); Stanford, CA
February 26, 2022; 4:00 p.m., P12N		at California	L 39–53	15–13 (8–10)	10 – Jones	5 – 3 tied	2 – Ingram	Haas Pavilion (2,773); Berkeley, CA
March 3, 2022; 6:00 p.m., ESPN2		at No. 2 Arizona	L 69–81	15–14 (8–11)	22 – Jones	9 – Ingram	5 – Ingram	McKale Center (14,382); Tucson, AZ
March 5, 2022; 12:00 p.m., P12N		at Arizona State	L 56–65	15–15 (8–12)	14 – Jones	9 – Ingram	4 – Ingram	Desert Financial Arena; Tempe, AZ
Pac-12 tournament
March 9, 2022; 12:00 p.m., P12N	(9)	vs. (8) Arizona State; First Round	W 71–70	16–15	–	–	–	T-Mobile Arena; Paradise, NV
March 10, 2022; 12:00 p.m., P12N	(9)	vs. (1) No. 2 Arizona; Quarterfinals	L 80–84	16–16	–	–	–	T-Mobile Arena; Paradise, NV
*Non-conference game. ^{#}Rankings from AP Poll. (#) Tournament seedings in parentheses. All times are in Pacific Time.
