= 2021–22 Arizona State Sun Devils men's basketball team =

American college basketball season

2021–22 Arizona State Sun Devils men's basketball
- Conference: Pac-12 Conference
- Record: 14–17 (10–10 Pac–12)
- Head coach: Bobby Hurley (7th season)
- Assistant coaches: Joel Justus; Jermaine Kimbrough; George Aramide
- Home arena: Desert Financial Arena

2021–22 Pac-12 Conference men's basketball standings
	Conf.				Overall
Team	W		L	PCT	W		L	PCT
No. 2 Arizona †	18	–	2	.900	33	–	4	.892
No. 11 UCLA	15	–	5	.750	27	–	8	.771
No. 22 USC	14	–	6	.700	26	–	8	.765
Colorado	12	–	8	.600	21	–	12	.636
Oregon	11	–	9	.550	20	–	15	.571
Washington	11	–	9	.550	17	–	15	.531
Washington State	11	–	9	.550	22	–	15	.595
Arizona State	10	–	10	.500	14	–	17	.452
Stanford	8	–	12	.400	16	–	16	.500
California	5	–	15	.250	12	–	20	.375
Utah	4	–	16	.200	11	–	20	.355
Oregon State	1	–	19	.050	3	–	28	.097
† Conference tournament winner Rankings from AP poll

The 2021–22 Arizona State Sun Devils men's basketball team represented Arizona State University during the 2021–22 NCAA Division I men's basketball season. The Sun Devils were led by seventh-year head coach Bobby Hurley, and played their home games at Desert Financial Arena in Tempe, Arizona as members of the Pac–12 Conference.

== Previous season ==
The Sun Devils finished the season 11–14, 7–10 in Pac-12 play to finish in ninth place. They defeated Washington State in the first round before losing in the quarterfinals of the Pac-12 tournament to Oregon.

== Off-season ==
=== Departures ===
Name	Num.	Pos.	Height	Weight	Year	Hometown	Reason for Departure
Holland Woods	0	G	6'1"	180	Senior	Phoenix, AZ	Graduate transferred to Grand Canyon
Remy Martin	1	G	6'0"	175	Senior	Chatsworth, CA	Graduate transferred to Kansas
Caleb Christopher	3	G	6'1"	180	Sophomore	Los Angeles, CA	Transferred to Tennessee Tech
Jaelen House	10	G	6'1"	160	Sophomore	Phoenix, AZ	Transferred to New Mexico
Alonzo Verge Jr.	11	G	6'2"	170	Senior	Chicago, IL	Graduate transferred to Nebraska
Josh Christopher	13	G	6'5"	215	Freshman	Carson, CA	Declared for 2021 NBA draft
Chris Osten	21	F	6'9"	210	Junior	Crowley, LA	Transferred to Northern Illinois
Kyle Feit	30	G	6'4"	215	RS Sophomore	West Palm Beach, FL	Walk-on; transferred
Taeshon Cherry	35	F	6'8"	220	Junior	El Cajon, CA	Transferred to Grand Canyon
Imran Takhar	41	G	6'3"	195	Senior	Orange, CA	Walk-on; left the team for personal reasons
Pavlo Dziuba	51	F	6'8"	225	Freshman	Kirichkova, Ukraine	Transferred to Maryland

=== Incoming transfers ===
Name	Num.	Pos.	Height	Weight	Year	Previous School	Notes
DJ Horne	0	G	6'1"	175	Junior	Raleigh, NC	Transferred from Illinois State.
Marreon Jackson	3	G	6'1"	190	Graduate Student	Cleveland, OH	Transferred from Toledo. Will be eligible to play immediately since Jackson graduated from Toledo.
Jay Heath	5	G	6'3"	195	Junior	Washington, D.C.	Transferred from Boston College.
Alonzo Gaffney	32	F/C	6'9"	200	Junior	Cleveland, OH	Junior college transferred from Northwest Florida State College
Chase Courtney	40	F	6'10"	230	Sophomore	Scottsdale, AZ	Transferred from San Jose State

=== 2021 recruiting class ===
College recruiting information
Name	Hometown	School	Height	Weight	Commit date
Demari Williams; SG	Fulshear, TX	Dream City Christian	6 ft 6 in (1.98 m)	190 lb (86 kg)	Sep 14, 2020
Demari Williams; SG	Recruit ratings: Rivals: 247Sports: ESPN: (0)				
Will Felton; PF	Raleigh, NC	Hargrave Military Academy	6 ft 9 in (2.06 m)	225 lb (102 kg)	Sep 20, 2020
Will Felton; PF	Recruit ratings: Rivals: 247Sports: ESPN: (75)				
Justin Rochelin; SG	Northridge, CA	Heritage Christian School	6 ft 5 in (1.96 m)	190 lb (86 kg)	Oct 17, 2020
Justin Rochelin; SG	Recruit ratings: Rivals: 247Sports: ESPN: (78)				
Jamiya Neal; SF	Phoenix, AZ	Hillcrest Prep	6 ft 6 in (1.98 m)	185 lb (84 kg)	Nov 16, 2020
Jamiya Neal; SF	Recruit ratings: Rivals: 247Sports: ESPN: (78)				
Enoch Boakye*; C	Mississauga, ON	George Harris Prep	6 ft 10 in (2.08 m)	240 lb (110 kg)	Mar 25, 2021
Enoch Boakye*; C	Recruit ratings: Rivals: 247Sports: ESPN: (0)				
Overall recruit ranking:
Note: In many cases, Scout, Rivals, 247Sports, On3, and ESPN may conflict in their listings of height and weight.; In these cases, the average was taken. ESPN grades are on a 100-point scale.; Sources: "2021 Team Ranking". Rivals.

*Originally class of 2022, but reclassified to 2021.

== Roster ==
2021–22 Arizona State Sun Devils men's basketball team
Players
Coaches

Pos.	#	Name	Height	Weight	Year	Previous school	Hometown
G	0	DJ Horne	6 ft 1 in (1.85 m)	175 lb (79 kg)	Jr	Illinois State	Raleigh, North Carolina
G	1	Luther Muhammad	6 ft 3 in (1.91 m)	195 lb (88 kg)	RS Jr	Ohio State	Newark, New Jersey
F	2	Jalen Graham	6 ft 9 in (2.06 m)	220 lb (100 kg)	Jr	Mountain Pointe HS	Phoenix, Arizona
G	3	Marreon Jackson	6 ft 1 in (1.85 m)	190 lb (86 kg)	GS	Toledo	Cleveland, Ohio
F	4	Kimani Lawrence	6 ft 6 in (1.98 m)	205 lb (93 kg)	GS	New Hampton School	Providence, Rhode Island
G	5	Jay Heath	6 ft 3 in (1.91 m)	195 lb (88 kg)	Jr	Boston College	Washington, D.C.
G	10	Justin Rochelin	6 ft 4 in (1.93 m)	190 lb (86 kg)	Fr	Heritage Christian School	Encino, California
G	11	Bobby Hurley (W)	6 ft 0 in (1.83 m)	160 lb (73 kg)	Fr	Notre Dame Prep	Scottsdale, Arizona
G	12	Micah Burno (W)	6 ft 0 in (1.83 m)	180 lb (82 kg)	Jr	Chaparral HS	Scottsdale, Arizona
C	14	Enoch Boakye	6 ft 10 in (2.08 m)	240 lb (109 kg)	Fr	George Harris Prep	Brampton, Ontario
F	15	John Olmsted (W)	6 ft 10 in (2.08 m)	235 lb (107 kg)	Jr	Morenci HS	Morenci, Arizona
G	20	Cade Ronzone (W)	6 ft 2 in (1.88 m)	180 lb (82 kg)	So	Bishop O'Dowd HS	Oakland, California
G/F	21	Demari Williams	6 ft 6 in (1.98 m)	210 lb (95 kg)	Fr	Dream City Christian School	Fulshear, Texas
G	22	Austin Ronzone (W)	6 ft 1 in (1.85 m)	178 lb (81 kg)	So	Bishop O'Dowd HS	Oakland, California
F	23	Marcus Bagley	6 ft 8 in (2.03 m)	215 lb (98 kg)	So	Sheldon HS	Phoenix, Arizona
G	24	Jeff Grace (W)	6 ft 3 in (1.91 m)	195 lb (88 kg)	Fr	York HS	Elmhurst, Illinois
G	25	Jordan Williams (W)	5 ft 10 in (1.78 m)	195 lb (88 kg)	Fr	AZ Compass Prep	Los Angeles, California
F/C	32	Alonzo Gaffney	6 ft 9 in (2.06 m)	200 lb (91 kg)	Jr	Northwest Florida State College	Cleveland, Ohio
F	34	Will Felton	6 ft 8 in (2.03 m)	240 lb (109 kg)	Fr	Millbrook HS	Raleigh, North Carolina
F	40	Chase Courtney	6 ft 10 in (2.08 m)	230 lb (104 kg)	So	San Jose State	Scottsdale, Arizona
G/F	55	Jamiya Neal	6 ft 6 in (1.98 m)	185 lb (84 kg)	Fr	Phoenix Hillcrest Prep	Toledo, Ohio

Head coach

- Bobby Hurley (Duke)

Assistant coach(es)

- Joel Justus (UNC Wilmington)
- Jermaine Kimbrough (Virginia Tech)
- George Aramide (Thompson Rivers University)

Legend

- (C) Team captain
- (S) Suspended
- (I) Ineligible
- (W) Walk-on
- Injured
- Current redshirt

Roster

== Schedule and results ==
Date time, TV	Rank^{#}	Opponent^{#}	Result	Record	High points	High rebounds	High assists	Site (attendance) city, state
Exhibition
November 1, 2021; 7:00 pm		Saint Katherine	W 108–41	–	18 – Heath	8 – Lawrence	5 – Tied	Desert Financial Arena (N/A); Tempe, AZ
Regular season
November 9, 2021*; 5:00 pm, P12N		Portland	W 76–60	1–0	19 – Lawrence	10 – Lawrence	5 – Jackson	Desert Financial Arena (6,912); Tempe, AZ
November 11, 2021*; 6:30 pm, P12N		UC Riverside	L 65–66	1–1	19 – Lawrence	12 – Lawrence	3 – Tied	Desert Financial Arena (7,594); Tempe, AZ
November 15, 2021*; 7:00 pm, P12N		North Florida	W 72–63	2–1	16 – Horne	9 – Gaffney	5 – Gaffney	Desert Financial Arena (6,977); Tempe, AZ
November 18, 2021*; 8:30 pm, CBSSN		at San Diego State	L 63–65	2–2	16 – Jackson	12 – Lawrence	7 – Jackson	Viejas Arena (12,414); San Diego, CA
November 24, 2021*; 5:30 pm, ESPN2		vs. No. 6 Baylor; Battle 4 Atlantis Quarterfinals	L 63–75	2–3	20 – Horne	11 – Jackson	10 – Jackson	Imperial Arena (848); Nassau, Bahamas
November 25, 2021*; 5:30 pm, ESPN2		vs. Syracuse; Battle 4 Atlantis consolation round	L 84–92	2–4	17 – Jackson	13 – Lawrence	7 – Jackson	Imperial Arena (1,299); Nassau, Bahamas
November 26, 2021*; 5:00 pm, ESPNews		vs. Loyola–Chicago; Battle 4 Atlantis 7th place game	L 59–77	2–5	16 – Heath	5 – Lawrence	2 – Jackson	Imperial Arena (739); Nassau, Bahamas
December 1, 2021; 5:30 pm, P12N		Washington State	L 29–51	2–6 (0–1)	10 – Horne	8 – Boakye	3 – Neal	Desert Financial Arena (6,793); Tempe, AZ
December 5, 2021; 5:00 pm, P12N		at Oregon	W 69–67 ^{OT}	3–6 (1–1)	23 – Horne	6 – Tied	3 – Tied	Matthew Knight Arena (6,130); Eugene, OR
December 9, 2021*; 7:30 pm, P12N		Grand Canyon	W 67–62	4–6	14 – Tied	14 – Lawrence	2 – Tied	Desert Financial Arena (11,391); Tempe, AZ
December 14, 2021*; 6:00 pm, FS1		at Creighton	W 58–57	5–6	12 – Horne	7 – Heath	4 – Jackson	CHI Health Center Omaha (15,011); Omaha, NE
December 19, 2021*; 4:00 pm, P12N		San Francisco	L 65–66	5–7	18 – Tied	12 – Heath	6 – Lawrence	Desert Financial Arena (6,403); Tempe, AZ
December 21, 2021*; 3:00 pm, P12N		Florida A&M	Canceled due to a power outage at Desert Financial Arena. (Note: This game was canceled on December 21 due to a facilities issue that caused a power outage at Desert Financial Arena. This game was declared a no contest by the NCAA.)					Desert Financial Arena; Tempe, AZ
January 2, 2022 (Note: This game was moved up from January 19 due to COVID pauses affecting their original scheduled opponents.); 5:00 pm, P12N		at California	L 50–74	5–8 (1–2)	17 – Horne	9 – Boakye	2 – Jackson	Haas Pavilion (2,976); Berkeley, CA
January 15, 2022; 8:00 pm, ESPN2		Colorado	L 57–75	5–9 (1–3)	16 – Graham	5 – Graham	2 – Horne	Desert Financial Arena (7,548); Tempe, AZ
January 17, 2022 (Note: This game was originally scheduled for January 13 before being postponed and rescheduled for January 17 due to COVID-19 protocols within the Arizona State program.); 2:00 pm, P12N		Utah	W 64–62	6–9 (2–3)	18 – Lawrence	6 – Boakye	4 – Jackson	Desert Financial Arena (6,482); Tempe, AZ
January 22, 2022; 9:00 pm, FS1		at Stanford	L 76–79	6–10 (2–4)	18 – Horne	6 – Graham	3 – Tied	Maples Pavilion (0); Stanford, CA
January 24, 2022 (Note: This game was originally scheduled for December 30 before being postponed and rescheduled for January 24 due to COVID-19 protocols within the USC program.); 9:00 pm, ESPN		at No. 15 USC	L 56–78	6–11 (2–5)	21 – Jackson	7 – Graham	2 – Tied	Galen Center (2,438); Los Angeles, CA
January 29, 2022; 12:30 pm, CBS		at No. 3 Arizona; Rivalry	L 56–67	6–12 (2–6)	17 – Horne	8 – Graham	4 – Jackson	McKale Center (14,644); Tucson, AZ
February 3, 2022; 9:00 pm, ESPN2		No. 19 USC	L 53–58	6–13 (2–7)	19 – Graham	8 – Lawrence	5 – Jackson	Desert Financial Arena (7,246); Tempe, AZ
February 5, 2022; 8:00 pm, ESPN2		No. 3 UCLA	W 87–84 ^{3OT}	7–13 (3–7)	24 – Jackson	10 – Graham	6 – Graham	Desert Financial Arena (9,135); Tempe, AZ
February 7, 2022 (Note: This game was originally scheduled for January 8 before being postponed and rescheduled for February 7 due to COVID-19 protocols within the Arizona State program.); 7:00 pm, FS1		No. 4 Arizona; Rivalry	L 79–91	7–14 (3–8)	16 – Tied	4 – Tied	8 – Jackson	Desert Financial Arena (13,233); Tempe, AZ
February 10, 2022; 9:00 pm, FS1		at Washington	L 64–87	7–15 (3–9)	15 – Lawrence	8 – Graham	6 – Jackson	Alaska Airlines Arena (5,154); Seattle, WA
February 12, 2022; 8:00 pm, ESPNU		at Washington State	W 58–55	8–15 (4–9)	14 – Tied	8 – Muhammad	4 – Jackson	Beasley Coliseum (3,394); Pullman, WA
February 17, 2022; 7:00 pm, ESPN		Oregon	W 81–57	9–15 (5–9)	18 – Graham	9 – Graham	6 – Heath	Desert Financial Arena (8,296); Tempe, AZ
February 19, 2022; 6:00 pm, ESPN2		Oregon State	W 73–53	10–15 (6–9)	15 – Jackson	7 – Lawrence	6 – Horne	Desert Financial Arena (7,234); Tempe, AZ
February 21, 2022 (Note: This game was originally scheduled on January 1 but was postponed and rescheduled to January 5 due to COVID-19 protocols within the UCLA program. It was then postponed and rescheduled to February 21 due to COVID-19 protocols within the Arizona State program.); 7:00 pm, FS1		at No. 12 UCLA	L 52–66	10–16 (6–10)	9 – Tied	5 – Tied	4 – Horne	Pauley Pavilion (8,037); Los Angeles, CA
February 24, 2022; 7:00 pm, P12N		at Colorado	W 82–65	11–16 (7–10)	18 – Heath	5 – Tied	4 – Jackson	CU Events Center (7,211); Boulder, CO
February 26, 2022; 8:00 pm, ESPNU		at Utah	W 63–61	12–16 (8–10)	20 – Heath	6 – Tied	6 – Jackson	Jon M. Huntsman Center (8,940); Salt Lake City, UT
March 3, 2022; 6:00 pm, P12N		California	W 71–44	13–16 (9–10)	13 – Horne	9 – Lawrence	4 – Tied	Desert Financial Arena (7,061); Tempe, AZ
March 5, 2022; 1:00 pm, P12N		Stanford	W 65–56	14–16 (10–10)	18 – Jackson	6 – Jackson	6 – Jackson	Desert Financial Arena (6,860); Tempe, AZ
Pac-12 tournament
March 9, 2022; 1:00 pm, P12N	(8)	vs. (9) Stanford; First Round	L 70–71	14–17	21 – Horne	6 – Graham	4 – Jackson	T-Mobile Arena (7,565); Paradise, NV
*Non-conference game. ^{#}Rankings from AP Poll. (#) Tournament seedings in parentheses. All times are in Mountain Time.

== Rankings ==
Ranking movements Legend: — = Not ranked
	Week																				
Poll	Pre	1	2	3	4	5	6	7	8	9	10	11	12	13	14	15	16	17	18	19	Final
AP														—	—						Not released
Coaches																					

*The preseason and week 1 polls were the same.
^Coaches poll was not released for Week 2.
