= 2021–22 California Golden Bears men's basketball team =

American college basketball season

2021–22 California Golden Bears men's basketball
- Conference: Pac-12 Conference
- Record: 12–20 (5–15 Pac–12)
- Head coach: Mark Fox (3rd season)
- Assistant coaches: Andrew Francis; Chris Harriman; Marty Wilson
- Home arena: Haas Pavilion (Capacity: 11,877)

2021–22 Pac-12 Conference men's basketball standings
	Conf.				Overall
Team	W		L	PCT	W		L	PCT
No. 2 Arizona †	18	–	2	.900	33	–	4	.892
No. 11 UCLA	15	–	5	.750	27	–	8	.771
No. 22 USC	14	–	6	.700	26	–	8	.765
Colorado	12	–	8	.600	21	–	12	.636
Oregon	11	–	9	.550	20	–	15	.571
Washington	11	–	9	.550	17	–	15	.531
Washington State	11	–	9	.550	22	–	15	.595
Arizona State	10	–	10	.500	14	–	17	.452
Stanford	8	–	12	.400	16	–	16	.500
California	5	–	15	.250	12	–	20	.375
Utah	4	–	16	.200	11	–	20	.355
Oregon State	1	–	19	.050	3	–	28	.097
† Conference tournament winner Rankings from AP poll

The 2021–22 California Golden Bears men's basketball team represented the University of California, Berkeley, in the 2021–22 NCAA Division I men's basketball season. This was Mark Fox's third year as head coach at California. The Golden Bears played their home games at Haas Pavilion as members of the Pac-12 Conference.

== Previous season ==
The Golden Bears finished the 2020–21 season with a record of 9–20, 3–17 in Pac-12 play to finish in last place. They defeated Stanford in the first round of the Pac-12 tournament before losing to Colorado in the quarterfinals.

== Off-season ==
=== Departures ===
California departures
Name	Number	Pos.	Height	Weight	Year	Hometown	Reason for departure
Ryan Betley	00	G	6'5"	200	(redshirt) Senior	Downingtown, PA	Graduated
Matt Bradley	20	G	6'4"	220	Junior	San Bernardino, CA	Transferred to San Diego State

=== Incoming transfers ===
California incoming transfers
Name	Number	Pos.	Height	Weight	Year	Hometown	Notes
Jordan Shepherd	31	G	6'4"	190	Graduate	Asheville, NC	Transfer from Charlotte. Had one year of eligibility remaining.

=== 2021 recruiting class ===
College recruiting
Name	Hometown	School	Height	Weight	Commit date
Obinna Anyanwu #35 PF	San Diego, CA	Cathedral Catholic High School	6 ft 7 in (2.01 m)	215 lb (98 kg)	Nov 13, 2020
Obinna Anyanwu #35 PF	Recruit ratings: Scout: Rivals: 247Sports: ESPN:				
Marsalis Roberson; SG	Oakland, CA	Bishop O'Dowd High School	6 ft 4 in (1.93 m)	175 lb (79 kg)	Oct 8, 2020
Marsalis Roberson; SG	Recruit ratings: Scout: Rivals: 247Sports: ESPN:				
Sam Alajiki; PF	Newark, NJ	Saint Benedict's Prep	6 ft 7 in (2.01 m)	225 lb (102 kg)	Nov 6, 2020
Sam Alajiki; PF	Recruit ratings: Scout: Rivals: 247Sports: ESPN:				
Overall recruit ranking:
Note: In many cases, Scout, Rivals, 247Sports, On3, and ESPN may conflict in their listings of height and weight.; In these cases, the average was taken. ESPN grades are on a 100-point scale.; Sources: "2021 California Commits". Rivals.; "2021 Team Ranking". Rivals.

== Roster ==
2021–22 California Golden Bears men's basketball team
Players
Coaches

Pos.	#	Name	Height	Weight	Year	Previous school	Hometown
G	0	Marsalis Roberson	6 ft 6 in (1.98 m)	190 lb (86 kg)	Fr	Bishop O'Dowd HS	Oakland, California
G	1	Joel Brown	6 ft 3 in (1.91 m)	192 lb (87 kg)	Jr	Brewster Academy	Brampton, Ontario
F	2	Monty Bowser	6 ft 7 in (2.01 m)	185 lb (84 kg)	So	Bishop O'Dowd HS	Oakland, California
G	3	Jarred Hyder	6 ft 3 in (1.91 m)	185 lb (84 kg)	Jr	Fresno State	San Bernardino, California
G	10	Makale Foreman	6 ft 1 in (1.85 m)	185 lb (84 kg)	GS	Stony Brook	Kingsport, Tennessee
F	13	Kuany Kuany	6 ft 9 in (2.06 m)	194 lb (88 kg)	Jr	Prolific Prep	Melbourne, Australia
F	15	Grant Anticevich	6 ft 9 in (2.06 m)	230 lb (104 kg)	GS	Newington College	Sydney, Australia
F/C	21	Lars Thiemann	7 ft 1 in (2.16 m)	255 lb (116 kg)	Jr	Bayer Giants U19	Krefeld, Germany
F	22	Andre Kelly (injured)	6 ft 9 in (2.06 m)	255 lb (116 kg)	Sr	Lincoln HS	Stockton, California
F	23	Obinna Anyanwu	6 ft 7 in (2.01 m)	220 lb (100 kg)	Fr	Cathedral Catholic HS	San Diego, California
F	24	Sam Alajiki	6 ft 7 in (2.01 m)	225 lb (102 kg)	Fr	St. Benedict's Prep	Dundalk, Ireland
G	25	Logan Alters (W)	6 ft 1 in (1.85 m)	185 lb (84 kg)	Jr	NSU University School	Miami, Florida
G	31	Jordan Shepherd	6 ft 4 in (1.93 m)	190 lb (86 kg)	GS	Charlotte	Asheville, North Carolina
G	32	Jalen Celestine	6 ft 7 in (2.01 m)	220 lb (100 kg)	So	Long Island Lutheran HS	Ajax, Ontario
F	33	D. J. Thorpe	6 ft 9 in (2.06 m)	235 lb (107 kg)	Jr	Lake Travis HS	Lake Travis, Texas
G	34	Dimitrios Klonaras	6 ft 6 in (1.98 m)	215 lb (98 kg)	Jr	P.A.O.K. BC	Thessaloniki, Greece
F	42	Blake Welle (W)	6 ft 8 in (2.03 m)	213 lb (97 kg)	RS Jr	Aptos HS	Santa Cruz, California

Head coach

- Mark Fox (Eastern New Mexico)

Assistant coach(es)

- Andrew Francis (Villanova)
- Chris Harriman (Augusta State)
- Marty Wilson (Pepperdine)

Legend

- (C) Team captain
- (S) Suspended
- (I) Ineligible
- (W) Walk-on
- Injured
- Current redshirt

Roster

== Schedule and results ==
Date time, TV	Rank^{#}	Opponent^{#}	Result	Record	High points	High rebounds	High assists	Site (attendance) city, state
Exhibition
November 1, 2021*; 6:00 pm		Cal State Los Angeles	W 92–58	–	23 – Anticevich	23 – Alajiki	5 – Brown	Haas Pavilion (3,527); Berkeley, CA
Regular season
November 9, 2021*; 2:00 pm, P12N		UC San Diego	L 67–80	0–1	27 – Shepherd	12 – Kelly	1 – Tied	Haas Pavilion (3,936); Berkeley, CA
November 13, 2021*; 5:00 pm, Stadium		at UNLV	L 52–55	0–2	11 – Anticevich	10 – Anticevich	3 – Kelly	Thomas & Mack Center (4,937); Paradise, NV
November 15, 2021*; 6:00 pm, P12N		San Diego	W 75–70	1–2	17 – Anticevich	8 – Kelly	7 – Brown	Haas Pavilion (4,218); Berkeley, CA
November 18, 2021*; 6:00 pm, P12N		Southern Utah; Fort Myers Tip-Off campus-site game	W 75–68 ^{2OT}	2–2	29 – Kelly	15 – Kelly	7 – Brown	Haas Pavilion (3,977); Berkeley, CA
November 22, 2021*; 5:30 pm, FS1		vs. No. 23 Florida; Fort Myers Tip-Off Beach Division semifinals	L 60–80	2–3	15 – Shepherd	4 – Kelly	2 – Shepherd	Suncoast Credit Union Arena (3,500); Fort Myers, FL
November 24, 2021*; 3:00 pm, FS1		vs. No. 21 Seton Hall; Fort Myers Tip-Off Beach Division consolation	L 59–62	2–4	23 – Kelly	11 – Kelly	2 – Tied	Suncoast Credit Union Arena (3,500); Fort Myers, FL
November 28, 2021*; 6:00 pm, P12N		Fresno State	W 65–57	3–4	17 – Shepherd	7 – Shepherd	3 – Anticevich	Haas Pavilion (3,857); Berkeley, CA
December 2, 2021; 7:30 pm, P12N		Oregon State	W 73–61	4–4 (1–0)	25 – Shepherd	13 – Kelly	3 – Tied	Haas Pavilion (4,505); Berkeley, CA
December 5, 2021; 2:00 pm, P12N		at Utah	L 58–66	4–5 (1–1)	14 – Shepherd	10 – Anticevich	2 – Tied	Jon M. Huntsman Center (6,548); Salt Lake City, UT
December 8, 2021*; 7:00 pm, P12N		Idaho State	W 72–46	5–5	12 – Tied	10 – Anticevich	7 – Shepherd	Haas Pavilion (3,132); Berkeley, CA
December 11, 2021*; 6:00 pm, P12N		Santa Clara	W 72–60	6–5	18 – Kelly	8 – Tied	6 – Shepherd	Haas Pavilion (4,606); Berkeley, CA
December 19, 2021*; 1:00 pm, P12N		Dartmouth	W 61–55	7–5	18 – Shepherd	15 – Anticevich	4 – Anticevich	Haas Pavilion (3,977); Berkeley, CA
December 22, 2021*; 3:00 pm, P12N		Pacific	W 73–53	8–5	25 – Anticevich	10 – Anticevich	8 – Brown	Haas Pavilion (3,712); Berkeley, CA
January 2, 2022 (Note: Moved up from January 19, 2022.); 4:00 pm, P12N		Arizona State	W 74–50	9–5 (2–1)	16 – Shepherd	10 – Anticevich	4 – Tied	Haas Pavilion (2,976); Berkeley, CA
January 6, 2022; 8:00 pm, FS1		No. 7 USC	L 63–77	9–6 (2–2)	19 – Anticevich	11 – Kelly	9 – Brown	Haas Pavilion (4,811); Berkeley, CA
January 8, 2022; 5:00 pm, P12N		No. 5 UCLA	L 52–60	9–7 (2–3)	22 – Kelly	8 – Anticevich	5 – Shepherd	Haas Pavilion (8,325); Berkeley, CA
January 12, 2022; 7:00 pm, P12N		at Washington	L 55–64	9–8 (2–4)	12 – Shepherd	5 – Tied	2 – Tied	Alaska Airlines Arena (5,448); Seattle, WA
January 15, 2022; 1:00 pm, P12N		at Washington State	L 57–65	9–9 (2–5)	17 – Shepherd	14 – Kelly	2 – Shepherd	Beasley Coliseum (3,051); Pullman, WA
January 23, 2022; 12:00 pm, P12N		No. 3 Arizona	L 71–96	9–10 (2–6)	21 – Shepherd	8 – Kelly	4 – Shepherd	Haas Pavilion (7,582); Berkeley, CA
January 27, 2022; 6:00 pm, P12N		at No. 7 UCLA	L 57–81	9–11 (2–7)	11 – Alajiki	7 – Kelly	3 – Brown	Pauley Pavilion (7,457); Los Angeles, CA
January 29, 2022; 4:00 pm, P12N		at No. 15 USC	L 72–79	9–12 (2–8)	13 – Foreman	7 – Anticevich	2 – Tied	Galen Center (4,293); Los Angeles, CA
February 1, 2022 (Note: This game was originally scheduled for January 2 before being rescheduled for February 1 due to COVID-19 protocols within the Stanford program.); 7:00 pm, P12N		at Stanford	L 50–57	9–13 (2–9)	15 – Shepherd	7 – Anticevich	3 – Shepherd	Maples Pavilion (3,072); Stanford, CA
February 3, 2022; 8:00 pm, P12N		Washington	L 63–84	9–14 (2–10)	10 – Anyanwu	6 – Tied	3 – Tied	Haas Pavilion (4,038); Berkeley, CA
February 5, 2022; 1:00 pm, P12N		Washington State	L 64–68	9–15 (2–11)	20 – Celestine	7 – Celestine	6 – Brown	Haas Pavilion (4,361); Berkeley, CA
February 9, 2022; 8:00 pm, ESPNU		at Oregon State	W 63–61	10–15 (3–11)	15 – Shepherd	9 – Brown	7 – Brown	Gill Coliseum (3,180); Corvallis, OR
February 12, 2022; 1:00 pm, P12N		at Oregon	W 78–64	11–15 (4–11)	33 – Shepherd	7 – Tied	3 – Shepherd	Matthew Knight Arena (6,762); Eugene, OR
February 17, 2022; 6:30 pm, P12N		Colorado	L 62–70	11–16 (4–12)	11 – Tied	7 – Kuany	3 – Tied	Haas Pavilion (4,396); Berkeley, CA
February 19, 2022; 3:00 pm, P12N		Utah	L 58–60	11–17 (4–13)	16 – Thiemann	8 – Thiemann	5 – Shepherd	Haas Pavilion (4,248); Berkeley, CA
February 26, 2022; 5:30 pm, P12N		Stanford	W 53–39	12–17 (5–13)	28 – Shepherd	8 – Tied	4 – Tied	Haas Pavilion (8,773); Berkeley, CA
March 3, 2022; 5:00 pm, P12N		at Arizona State	L 44–71	12–18 (5–14)	11 – Celestine	6 – Tied	5 – Brown	Desert Financial Arena (7,061); Tempe, AZ
March 5, 2022; 2:00 pm, P12N		at No. 2 Arizona	L 61–89	12–19 (5–15)	16 – Shepherd	6 – Anticevich	2 – Thiemann	McKale Center (14,644); Tucson, AZ
Pac-12 tournament
March 9, 2022; 6:00 pm, P12N	(10)	vs. (7) Washington State; First Round	L 59–66	12–20	19 – Shepherd	10 – Thiemann	3 – Foreman	T-Mobile Arena (–); Paradise, NV
*Non-conference game. ^{#}Rankings from AP Poll. (#) Tournament seedings in parentheses. All times are in Pacific Time.

== Rankings ==
Ranking movements Legend: — = Not ranked
	Week																				
Poll	Pre	1	2	3	4	5	6	7	8	9	10	11	12	13	14	15	16	17	18	19	Final
AP	—	—*												—	—						Not released
Coaches	—	—*																			

*The preseason and week 1 polls were the same.
^Coaches poll was not released for Week 2.
