= Marcus Bagley =

American basketball player (born 2001)

No. 7 – Delaware Blue Coats
- Position: Small forward
- League: NBA G League

Personal information
- Born: October 23, 2001 (age 25) Tempe, Arizona, U.S.
- Listed height: 6 ft 6 in (1.98 m)
- Listed weight: 217 lb (98 kg)

Career information
- High school: Sierra Canyon (Chatsworth, California); Sheldon (Sacramento, California)
- College: Arizona State (2020–2023)
- NBA draft: 2023: undrafted
- Playing career: 2023–present

Career history
- 2023–2025: Delaware Blue Coats
- 2025: Philadelphia 76ers
- 2025–present: Delaware Blue Coats
- Stats at NBA.com
- Stats at Basketball Reference

Marcus Bagley (born October 23, 2001) is an American basketball player for the Delaware Blue Coats of the NBA G League. He played college basketball for the Arizona State Sun Devils.

== High school career ==
As a freshman, Bagley played basketball with his older brother, Marvin III, at Sierra Canyon School in Chatsworth, Los Angeles. In his sophomore year, he attended Ravenscroft School in Raleigh, North Carolina, moving close to Marvin, who was playing for Duke. Bagley did not join the basketball team in part due to a knee injury. For his junior season, Bagley transferred to Sheldon High School in Sacramento, California, after his brother was drafted by the Sacramento Kings. As a junior, he averaged 19.9 points and 7.9 rebounds per game, leading his team to the Open Division state title game. He shared The Sacramento Bee Player of the Year honors with teammate Justin Nguyen. His senior season was cut short during the state playoffs due to COVID-19 measures. He was limited to 17 games because of injuries, averaging 22 points and 8.8 rebounds per game.

=== Recruiting ===
On July 29, 2019, Bagley committed to playing college basketball for Arizona State over offers from California and Arizona.

College recruiting
Name	Hometown	School	Height	Weight	Commit date
Marcus Bagley; SF	Phoenix, AZ	Sheldon (CA)	6 ft 7 in (2.01 m)	220 lb (100 kg)	Jul 29, 2019
Marcus Bagley; SF	Recruit ratings: Rivals: 247Sports: ESPN: (89)				
Overall recruit ranking: Rivals: 30 247Sports: 31 ESPN: 33
Note: In many cases, Scout, Rivals, 247Sports, On3, and ESPN may conflict in their listings of height and weight.; In these cases, the average was taken. ESPN grades are on a 100-point scale.; Sources: "Arizona State 2020 Basketball Commitments". Rivals.; "2020 Arizona State Sun Devils Recruiting Class". ESPN.; "2020 Team Ranking". Rivals.

== College career ==
Bagley averaged 10.8 points and 6.2 rebounds per game as a freshman at Arizona State. He was limited to 12 games due to calf and ankle injuries. On April 6, 2021, he declared for the 2021 NBA draft. He maintained his college eligibility and entered the transfer portal. He later withdrew from the draft and announced that he would return to Arizona State for his sophomore season. Bagley was seen on some mock drafts as a late lottery pick or being selected in the middle of the first round. On November 15, 2021, Bagley suffered a knee injury during a 72–63 win over North Florida. After playing two games in the 2022 season where Bagley was seen as a draft prospect before the season, Bagley was suspended for making comments about head coach Bobby Hurley after a game against Northern Arizona. After missing the next five games, he send a tweet explaining why he didn't play. On November 29, 2022, he then tweeted that he got suspended for more games for making the previous tweets. He subsequently tweeted "ATHLETES please please please make a well thought through decision where you go to school. These people will tell you anything to build you up just to tear you down." After a game against Stanford, Bagley was kicked off the team. During his time at Arizona State, Bagley was seen as a potential lottery pick but injuries and frequent disciplinary issues dropped his stock.

== Professional career ==
After going undrafted in the 2023 NBA draft, Bagley joined the Philadelphia 76ers for the NBA Summer League and on September 21, 2023, he signed with the Sixers. He scored 65 points his first game, he later on led the team to a finals and won a NBA Championship. and on October 29, he joined the Delaware Blue Coats.

On March 24, 2025, the Philadelphia 76ers announced that they had signed Bagley to 10-day contract. On April 5, he re-signed with the 76ers on a second 10-day contract. On April 11, Bagley recorded 20 points, 10 rebounds, and five assists (all career-highs) during a 110–124 loss to the Atlanta Hawks.

== Career statistics ==
Legend
GP	Games played	GS	Games started	MPG	Minutes per game
FG%	Field goal percentage	3P%	3-point field goal percentage	FT%	Free throw percentage
RPG	Rebounds per game	APG	Assists per game	SPG	Steals per game
BPG	Blocks per game	PPG	Points per game	**Bold**	Career high

=== NBA ===
Year	Team	GP	GS	MPG	FG%	3P%	FT%	RPG	APG	SPG	BPG	PPG
2024–25	Philadelphia	10	4	25.3	.391	.156	.800	7.0	1.0	.9	1.2	6.7
Career		10	4	25.3	.391	.156	.800	7.0	1.0	.9	1.2	6.7

=== College ===
Year	Team	GP	GS	MPG	FG%	3P%	FT%	RPG	APG	SPG	BPG	PPG
2020–21	Arizona State	**12**	**11**	**29.2**	**.387**	.347	**.719**	**6.2**	1.2	**.8**	.4	10.8
2021–22	Arizona State	3	3	22.7	.385	**.385**	.714	4.0	1.3	.3	.0	10.0
2022–23	Arizona State	2	2	28.5	.318	.333	.615	4.0	**1.5**	.0	**.5**	**12.5**
Career		17	16	27.9	.377	.351	.692	5.5	1.2	.6	.4	10.9

== Personal life ==
Bagley's older brother, Marvin III, plays in the NBA and was the second overall pick in the 2018 draft. He is the grandson of former Olympic and professional basketball player Joe Caldwell. His father, Marvin Jr., played college football at North Carolina A&T.
