= Marreon Jackson =

American basketball player

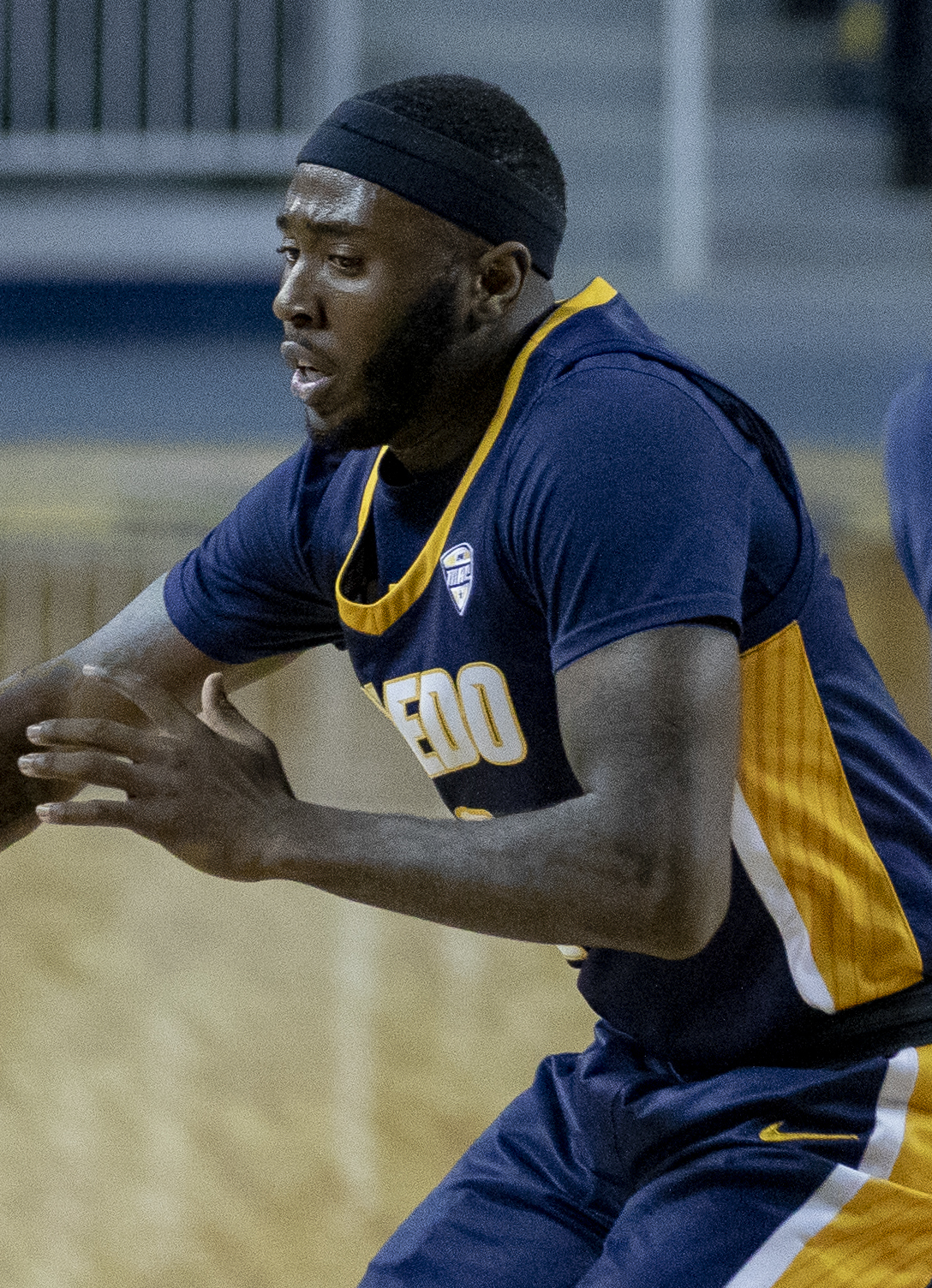
- Jackson with Toledo in 2020

Surrey 89ers
- Position: Point guard
- League: Super League Basketball

Personal information
- Born: October 29, 1998 (age 28) Cleveland, Ohio, U.S.
- Listed height: 6 ft 1 in (1.85 m)
- Listed weight: 190 lb (86 kg)

Career information
- High school: Garfield Heights (Garfield Heights, Ohio)
- College: Toledo (2017–2021); Arizona State (2021–2022)
- Playing career: 2022–present

Career history
- 2022–2023: Fenerbahçe Koleji
- 2023: Voluntari
- 2023–2024: Kalev/Cramo
- 2024: Lavrio
- 2024: Þór Þorlákshöfn
- 2025–2026: Köping Stars
- 2026–present: Surrey 89ers

Career highlights
- MAC Player of the Year (2021); First-team All-MAC (2021); Second-team All-MAC (2020); MAC All-Freshman Team (2018)

Marreon Jamar Jackson (born October 29, 1998) is an American professional basketball player for the Surrey 89ers of the Super League Basketball (SLB). He played college basketball for the Toledo Rockets and the Arizona State Sun Devils.

== High school career ==
Jackson grew up in Cleveland, Ohio and initially played football before switching to basketball. He attended Garfield Heights High School alongside later Toledo teammate Willie Jackson. As a senior, Jackson averaged 23.2 points, seven assists and seven rebounds per game. He led Garfield Heights to a 22–5 record and the Division I regional championship, and he was named to the Cleveland.com First Team. Jackson committed to playing college basketball for Toledo in February 2016 over offers from Kent State, Cleveland State, Buffalo and Eastern Kentucky.

== College career ==
Jackson began his college career with the Toledo Rockets. He averaged eight points per game as a freshman. He was named to the Mid-American Conference (MAC) All-Freshman Team. In April 2018, Jackson collapsed on the hardwood after running a drill and was rushed to the hospital, where he was diagnosed with a heart condition and permitted to continue playing basketball. As a sophomore, he averaged 11.7 points, 4.2 assists, and 1.4 steals per game and was named honorable mention all-conference. After the season, he had shoulder surgery. On February 25, 2020, he had a career-high 37 points in a 93–81 win against Central Michigan. Jackson averaged 19.8 points and 5.4 assists per game as a junior, both of which were second-highest in the MAC. He was named to the Second Team All-MAC. Following the season he declared for the 2020 NBA draft. On April 27, 2020, Jackson announced he was returning to Toledo, citing "unfinished business." As a senior, he averaged 18.1 points, 6.1 rebounds and 5.9 assists per game, earning MAC Player of the Year and First Team All-MAC honors. After the season, he transferred to Arizona State. On February 7, 2022, Jackson scored 16 points and surpassed the 2,000 point mark in a 91–79 loss to Arizona.

== Professional career ==
On July 29, 2022, Jackson signed with Fenerbahçe Koleji of the Turkish Basketball Second League.

On July 19, 2023, Jackson signed with CSO Voluntari of the Romanian Liga Națională.

After a stint in Estonia with Kalev/Cramo, Jackson moved to Greek club Lavrio. In 6 games, he averaged 4.2 points per contest.

In August 2024, Jackson signed with Þór Þorlákshöfn of the Icelandic Úrvalsdeild karla.

== Career statistics ==
Legend
GP	Games played	GS	Games started	MPG	Minutes per game
FG%	Field goal percentage	3P%	3-point field goal percentage	FT%	Free throw percentage
RPG	Rebounds per game	APG	Assists per game	SPG	Steals per game
BPG	Blocks per game	PPG	Points per game	**Bold**	Career high

=== College ===
Year	Team	GP	GS	MPG	FG%	3P%	FT%	RPG	APG	SPG	BPG	PPG
2017–18	Toledo	**33**	**32**	29.7	.405	**.422**	.750	2.9	2.7	.8	.1	8.0
2018–19	Toledo	32	31	29.2	**.428**	.359	.772	3.9	4.2	1.4	.1	11.7
2019–20	Toledo	32	**32**	**35.3**	.409	.369	.816	4.3	5.4	1.5	.0	**19.8**
2020–21	Toledo	30	30	34.2	.403	.348	**.904**	**6.1**	**5.9**	**1.8**	**.3**	18.1
2021–22	Arizona State	31	17	28.6	.361	.277	.808	3.9	4.0	1.7	.0	10.4
Career		158	142	31.4	.402	.354	.822	4.2	4.4	1.4	.1	13.5

== Personal life ==
Jackson is the son of Lawanda and Herman Jackson. His older brother Marquis Jackson played basketball at Ohio Christian University. His second cousin Demario McCall is a cornerback at Ohio State.
