= Efe Abogidi =

Nigerian basketball player (born 2001)

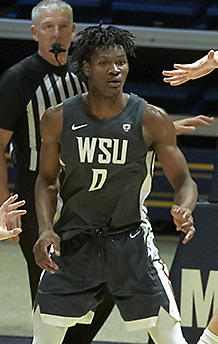
- Abogidi with Washington State in 2021

No. 1 – Obradoiro CAB
- Position: Center
- League: Liga ACB

Personal information
- Born: 11 October 2001 (age 25) Nigeria
- Listed height: 6 ft 10 in (2.08 m)
- Listed weight: 225 lb (102 kg)

Career information
- High school: NBA Academy Africa (Saly, Senegal)
- College: Washington State (2020–2022)
- NBA draft: 2023: undrafted
- Playing career: 2022–present

Career history
- 2022–2024: NBA G League Ignite
- 2025: Central Districts Lions
- 2025–2026: Rio Grande Valley Vipers
- 2026–present: Obradoiro

Career highlights
- NBL1 Central All-Star Five (2025); Pac-12 All-Freshman Team (2021)

Efemena Tennyson Abogidi (born 11 October 2001) is a Nigerian professional basketball player for Obradoiro of the Liga ACB. He played college basketball for the Washington State Cougars of the Pac-12 Conference.

== Early life and career ==
Abogidi grew up in Ughelli, a town in Delta State, Nigeria. He competed in track and field, including sprinting, long jump and high jump. Abogidi watched highlight videos of Tim Duncan, who he tried to emulate in local pick-up basketball games. In 2015 and 2016, he was named most valuable player of a camp run by Olumide Oyedeji in Lagos. Abogidi joined Hoops & Read, a program created by Oyedeji's foundation, and helped his team earn a promotion into the Nigerian Premier League in 2016. In the next year, he moved to Senegal to attend the NBA Academy Africa in its first year. In June 2017, at the NBA Academy Games in Canberra, Australia, he suffered a torn ACL, MCL and meniscus while attempting a slam dunk. He underwent surgery and began attending the NBA Global Academy in Canberra. He committed to playing college basketball for Washington State over offers from Creighton and UT Arlington.

== College career ==
Abogidi played two seasons of college basketball for the Washington State Cougars between 2020 and 2022. In December 2020, Abogidi recorded three consecutive double-doubles and was named Pac-12 Freshman of the Week. He averaged 8.9 points, 7.2 rebounds and 1.3 blocks per game as a freshman, earning Pac-12 All-Freshman Team honors for the 2020–21 season. In 2021–22, he played all 37 games and made 29 starts while finishing fourth on the team in scoring at 8.1 points on 51.0% shooting and averaging a team-best 5.8 rebounds per game.

== Professional career ==
On June 24, 2022, Abogidi signed with the NBA G League Ignite of the NBA G League. On January 3, 2023, he suffered a knee injury during the first quarter of the team's game against the Birmingham Squadron. He was subsequently ruled out for the rest of the season after undergoing surgery. In 22 games during the 2022–23 season, he averaged 8.3 points, 5.5 rebounds, 1.0 assists and 1.0 blocks in 18.6 minutes per game.

Abogidi returned to the Ignite 2023–24 season but did not appear in a game.

In October 2024, Abogidi signed with the Central Districts Lions of the NBL1 Central in Australia for the 2025 season. He was named to the NBL1 Central All-Star Five.

On August 4, 2026, Abogidi signed with Obradoiro of the Liga ACB.

== Career statistics ==
Legend
GP	Games played	GS	Games started	MPG	Minutes per game
FG%	Field goal percentage	3P%	3-point field goal percentage	FT%	Free throw percentage
RPG	Rebounds per game	APG	Assists per game	SPG	Steals per game
BPG	Blocks per game	PPG	Points per game	**Bold**	Career high

=== College ===
Year	Team	GP	GS	MPG	FG%	3P%	FT%	RPG	APG	SPG	BPG	PPG
2020–21	Washington State	27	27	24.4	.491	.273	.811	7.2	.4	.7	1.3	8.9

== National team career ==
Agbogidi was called up to play for the Nigeria men's national basketball team during the 2027 FIBA Basketball World Cup qualification games, during the August 27–30, 2026 qualifying window.
