= Terrell Brown Jr. =

American basketball player (born 1998)

No. 3 – Salt Lake City Stars
- Position: Point guard / shooting guard
- League: NBA G League

Personal information
- Born: April 23, 1998 (age 28) Seattle, Washington, U.S.
- Listed height: 6 ft 3 in (1.91 m)
- Listed weight: 180 lb (82 kg)

Career information
- High school: Garfield (Seattle, Washington)
- College: Shoreline CC (2017–2018); Seattle (2018–2020); Arizona (2020–2021); Washington (2021–2022)
- NBA draft: 2022: undrafted
- Playing career: 2022–present

Career history
- 2022–2023: Memphis Hustle
- 2023–2024: Greensboro Swarm
- 2025: Ángeles de la Ciudad de México
- 2025: Panteras de Aguascalientes
- 2025–2026: Greensboro Swarm
- 2026: Ángeles de la Ciudad de México
- 2026–present: Salt Lake City Stars

Career highlights
- NBA G League champion (2026); First-team All-Pac-12 (2022); First-team All-WAC (2020); Second-team All-WAC (2019); WAC All-Newcomer Team (2019)
- Stats at NBA.com
- Stats at Basketball Reference

Terrell Brown Jr. (born April 23, 1998) is an American professional basketball player for the Salt Lake City Stars of the NBA G League. He played college basketball for the Shoreline CC Dolphins, Seattle Redhawks, Arizona Wildcats, and Washington Huskies.

== High school career ==
Brown played basketball for Garfield High School in Seattle, Washington, where he won two state championships. He had a limited role during his high school career, playing alongside Jaylen Nowell and Tramaine Isabell. Brown was lightly recruited and only received offers from NCAA Division II programs.

== College career ==
Brown first attended Western Oregon University but returned home after one month after struggling to adjust to living in a small college town. He attended Green River College for the rest of the year before joining the team at Shoreline Community College, where his cousin served as assistant coach. As a freshman, Brown averaged 30 points per game, leading the Northwest Athletic Conference in scoring and steals. He received Freshman of the Year and All-Defensive Team honors.

For his sophomore season, Brown joined NCAA Division I program Seattle as a walk-on. He earned a scholarship in the second semester of his first year. As a sophomore, Brown averaged 14.1 points, 6.8 rebounds and 4.5 assists per game, earning Second Team All-Western Athletic Conference (WAC) and All-Newcomer Team honors. In his junior season, he averaged a conference-leading 20.8 points, 6.2 rebounds and 4.8 assists per game, and was named to the First Team All-WAC. For his senior season, Brown transferred to Arizona. As a senior, he averaged 7.3 points, 3.5 rebounds and 3.5 assists per game. Brown opted to use an additional year of eligibility, granted due to the COVID-19 pandemic, and transfer to Washington. On November 23, 2021, he scored a career-high 32 points in an 87–76 win against South Dakota State. Brown was named first-team All-Pac-12.

== Professional career ==
After going undrafted in the 2022 NBA draft, Brown joined the Minnesota Timberwolves for Summer League. On October 22, 2022, Brown was selected by the College Park Skyhawks in the 2022 NBA G League draft with the 7th overall pick. However, he was waived 6 days later. On November 15, he signed with the Memphis Hustle.

On October 20, 2023, Brown signed with the Charlotte Hornets, but was waived the next day. On October 29, he signed with the Greensboro Swarm.

On August 6, 2026, Brown agreed to a contract with the Utah Jazz.

== Career statistics ==
Legend
GP	Games played	GS	Games started	MPG	Minutes per game
FG%	Field goal percentage	3P%	3-point field goal percentage	FT%	Free throw percentage
RPG	Rebounds per game	APG	Assists per game	SPG	Steals per game
BPG	Blocks per game	PPG	Points per game	**Bold**	Career high

=== College ===
==== NCAA Division I ====
Year	Team	GP	GS	MPG	FG%	3P%	FT%	RPG	APG	SPG	BPG	PPG
2018–19	Seattle	**33**	28	33.4	**.455**	.318	.682	**6.8**	4.5	1.1	.3	14.1
2019–20	Seattle	29	29	36.0	.415	.291	**.784**	6.2	**4.8**	1.6	.4	20.8
2020–21	Arizona	26	10	25.7	.390	**.368**	.776	3.5	3.5	.9	.2	7.3
2021–22	Washington	32	**32**	**36.1**	.452	.200	.772	4.2	4.3	**2.2**	**.5**	**21.7**
Career		120	99	33.1	.434	.284	.756	5.2	4.3	1.5	.4	16.3

==== JUCO ====
Year	Team	GP	GS	MPG	FG%	3P%	FT%	RPG	APG	SPG	BPG	PPG
2017–18	Shoreline CC	25	25	34.6	.437	.347	.746	8.0	4.0	3.2	.3	30.0

== Personal life ==
Brown is the godson of Jason Terry, who played in the NBA before becoming a coach. Terry served as his assistant coach at Arizona.
