= Isaiah Mobley =

Bahamian–American basketball player (born 1999)

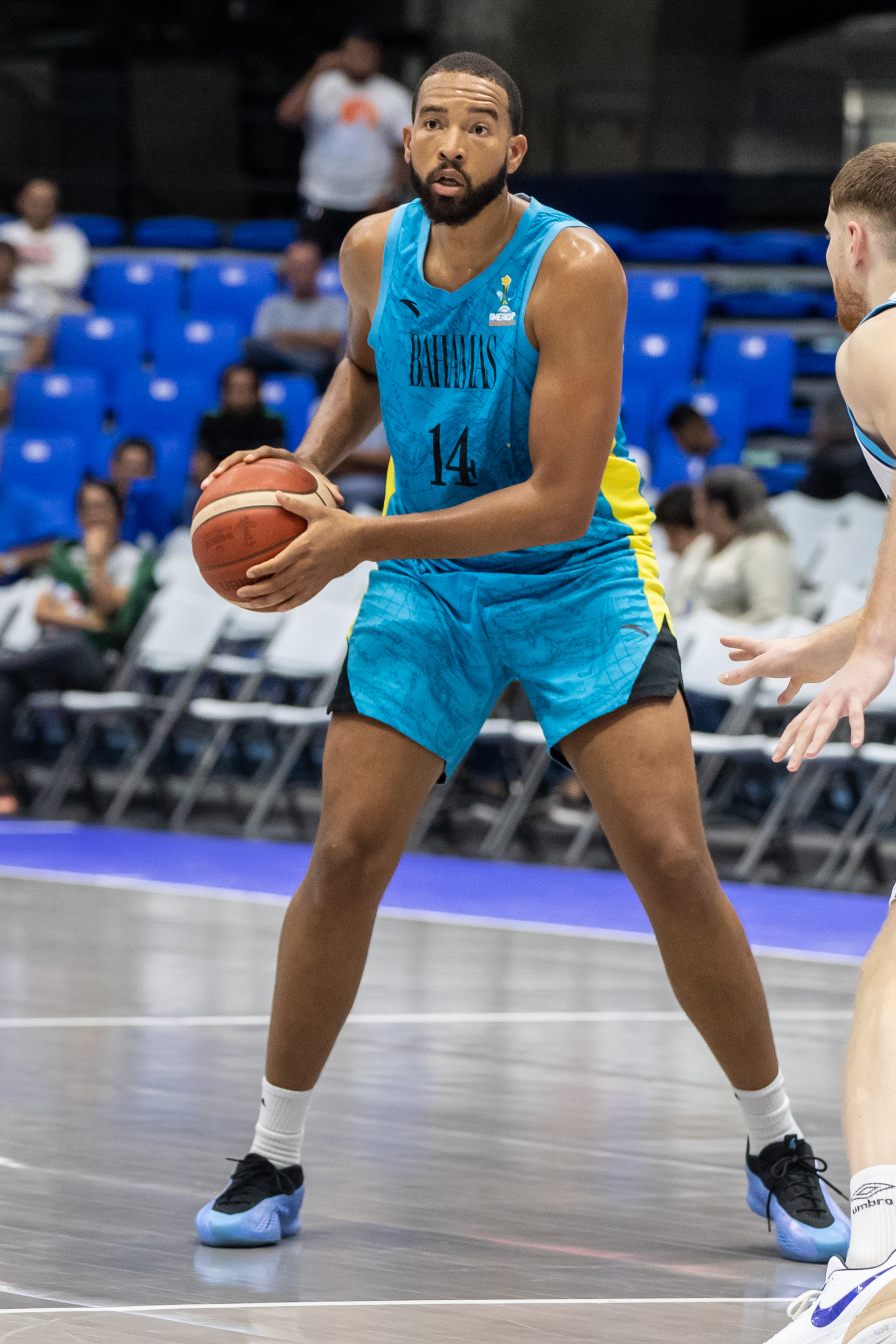
- Mobley with the Bahamas 2025

No. 33 – Bàsquet Manresa
- Position: Power forward
- League: Liga ACB; EuroCup

Personal information
- Born: September 24, 1999 (age 27) San Diego, California, U.S.
- Listed height: 6 ft 9 in (2.06 m)
- Listed weight: 238 lb (108 kg)

Career information
- High school: Rancho Christian School (Temecula, California)
- College: USC (2019–2022)
- NBA draft: 2022: 2nd round, 49th overall pick
- Drafted by: Cleveland Cavaliers
- Playing career: 2022–present

Career history
- 2022–2024: Cleveland Cavaliers
- 2022–2024: →Cleveland Charge
- 2024–2025: Delaware Blue Coats
- 2025: Philadelphia 76ers
- 2025: Manisa Basket
- 2025–2026: Hapoel Jerusalem
- 2026–present: Bàsquet Manresa

Career highlights
- All-NBA G League Third Team (2023); NBA G League Next Up Game (2023); First-team All-Pac-12 (2022); McDonald's All-American (2019)
- Stats at NBA.com
- Stats at Basketball Reference

Eric Isaiah Mobley (born September 24, 1999) is a Bahamian American professional basketball player for Bàsquet Manresa of the Liga ACB and the EuroCup. He played college basketball for the USC Trojans.

Mobley attended Rancho Christian School in Temecula, California, where he was a five-star recruit and a McDonald's All-American. He was named first-team All-Pac-12 as a junior with USC, and was drafted in the second round of the 2022 NBA draft.

== High school career ==
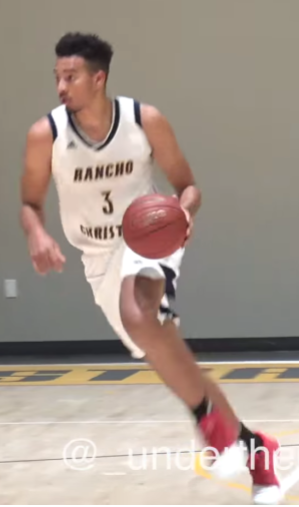
Mobley in High School in 2019

Mobley attended Rancho Christian School in Temecula, California. As a freshman, he and the team won the CIF Southern Section (CIF-SS) Division 5A title, the school's first in any sport, and he led his team to the CIF Division V Southern California Regional final. After averaging 16.2 points and 10.4 rebounds per game, Mobley shared CIF-SS Division 5A player of the year honors and made The Press-Enterprise All-Area second team. Over the summer, he played for the Compton Magic, one of the top travel teams in the country.

As a sophomore, Mobley was joined on the Rancho Christian basketball team by his younger brother Evan Mobley. He helped his team reach the CIF-SS Division 2A semifinal.

In his junior season, Mobley averaged 19.9 points, 11.3 rebounds, and four assists per game and was named The Press-Enterprise player of the year and made the USA Today All-USA California second team and MaxPreps Junior All-American honorable mention team. He guided Rancho Christian to a 29–5 record and a CIF-SS Open Division playoff appearance.

As a senior, Mobley averaged 19.4 points, 13.6 rebounds, and 3.8 assists per game, helping his team to a 26–6 record. He earned honorable mention on the MaxPreps All-American and USA Today All-USA teams, while making the All-USA California first team. Mobley played in the 2019 McDonald's All-American Game. Mobley at one point in high school was projected to be the second pick of the 2020 NBA draft, and his brother Evan Mobley was projected to be in the 2021 NBA draft.

=== Recruiting ===
Mobley received offers from several NCAA Division I programs, including San Diego State and Nevada, before starting high school. On May 28, 2018, as a high school junior, he committed to playing college basketball for USC. By the end of his high school career, Mobley was considered a consensus five-star recruit and the best 2019 class prospect in California.

College recruiting
Name	Hometown	School	Height	Weight	Commit date
Isaiah Mobley; PF	Murrieta, CA	Rancho Christian School (CA)	6 ft 9 in (2.06 m)	210 lb (95 kg)	May 18, 2018
Isaiah Mobley; PF	Recruit ratings: Rivals: 247Sports: ESPN: (95)				
Overall recruit ranking: Rivals: 23 247Sports: 23 ESPN: 16
Note: In many cases, Scout, Rivals, 247Sports, On3, and ESPN may conflict in their listings of height and weight.; In these cases, the average was taken. ESPN grades are on a 100-point scale.; Sources: "USC 2019 Basketball Commitments". Rivals.; "2019 USC Trojans Recruiting Class". ESPN.; "2019 Team Ranking". Rivals.

== College career ==
In his debut for USC, Mobley had 17 points and seven rebounds to lead the Trojans to a 77–48 victory over Florida A&M. He had 15 points and nine rebounds in a 101–79 loss to Marquette on November 29, 2019. Mobley made eight starts as a freshman and averaged 6.2 points and 5.3 rebounds per game.

As a sophomore, he averaged 9.9 points, 7.3 rebounds (3rd in the Pac-12), and 0.9 blocks (9th) per game. On April 17, 2021, he declared for the 2021 NBA draft while maintaining his college eligibility; he withdrew from the draft in July on the day of the deadline.

As a junior, he averaged 14.2 points (7th in the Pac-12), 8.3 rebounds (2nd), 3.3 assists, and 0,9 blocks per game. Mobley was named first-team All-Pac-12 as a junior. On April 11, 2022, Mobley declared for the 2022 NBA draft, forgoing his remaining college eligibility.

== Professional career ==
=== Cleveland Cavaliers / Charge (2022–2024) ===
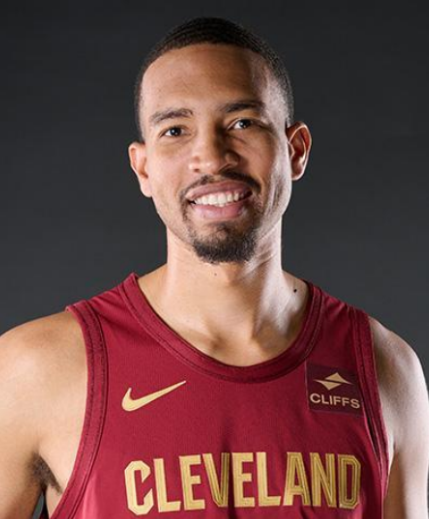
Mobley in 2023

Mobley was selected in the 2022 NBA draft with the 49th overall pick by the Cleveland Cavaliers. On July 2, 2022, the Cavaliers signed him to a two-way contract. Under the terms of the deal, he split time between the Cavaliers and their NBA G League affiliate, the Cleveland Charge. Mobley was named to the G League's inaugural Next Up Game for the 2022–23 season. In 2022-23 with Cleveland, he played in 12 games, averaging 7.0 minutes per game. In 2022-23 with the Charge, he played in 23 games, averaging 20.1 points, 8.1 rebounds, 3.8 assists, and 1.1 blocks per game while shooting .522 from the field.

On July 7, 2023, Mobley signed another two-way contract with the Cavaliers. During the 2023 NBA Summer League, Mobley averaged 17.4 points, 8.3 rebounds, 4.5 assists, and 1.5 blocks across six games. During the Summer League's championship game, Mobley led the team to a win behind a 28 point and 11 rebound outing. In 2023-24 with Cleveland, he played in 10 games, averaging 7.2 minutes per game. In 2023-24 with the Charge, he played in 23 games, averaging 17.1 points, 8.1 rebounds, 3.3 assists, and 0.9 blocks per game.

=== Delaware Blue Coats / Philadelphia 76ers (2024–2025) ===
On September 30, 2024, Mobley signed with the Philadelphia 76ers, but he was waived on October 17. On October 28, he joined the Delaware Blue Coats.

On April 13, 2025, prior to Philadelphia's season finale, Mobley signed with the 76ers. In 2024-25 with Philadelphia, he played in one game, playing 17.4 minutes and scoring 6 points. In 2024-25 with the Blue Coats, he played in 22 games, averaging 17.5 points, 7.9 rebounds, 3.5 assists, and 0.7 blocks per game.

=== Manisa Basket (2025) ===
On August 13, 2025, Mobley signed with Manisa Basket of the Turkish Basketbol Süper Ligi (BSL). In 2025 with Manisa, he played in 9 games, averaging 10.7 points, 4.4 rebounds, and 2.0 assists per game while shooting .522 from the field.

=== Hapoel Jerusalem (2025–2026) ===
On December 14, 2025, Mobley signed with Hapoel Jerusalem of the Israeli Basketball Premier League. Playing for Hapoel Jerusalem in 2025-26, he played eight games in the Israel Basket Premier League (averaging 8.0 points and 5.0 rebounds per game), and six games in the Eurocup (averaging 6.2 points and 4.0 rebounds per game).

=== Bàsquet Manresa (2026–present) ===
On November 3, 2026, he signed with Kids&Us Manresa of the Liga ACB and the EuroCup.

== Career statistics ==
Legend
GP	Games played	GS	Games started	MPG	Minutes per game
FG%	Field goal percentage	3P%	3-point field goal percentage	FT%	Free throw percentage
RPG	Rebounds per game	APG	Assists per game	SPG	Steals per game
BPG	Blocks per game	PPG	Points per game	**Bold**	Career high

=== NBA ===
Year	Team	GP	GS	MPG	FG%	3P%	FT%	RPG	APG	SPG	BPG	PPG
2022–23	Cleveland	**12**	0	7.0	**.429**	**.375**	**1.000**	1.7	.3	.3	.3	2.6
2023–24	Cleveland	10	0	7.2	.417	.300	.000	1.0	.6	.2	.0	2.3
2024–25	Philadelphia	1	0	**17.4**	.286	.333	.500	**4.0**	**5.0**	**1.0**	**1.0**	**6.0**
Career		23	0	7.5	.407	.333	.714	1.5	.6	.3	.2	2.6

=== College ===
Year	Team	GP	GS	MPG	FG%	3P%	FT%	RPG	APG	SPG	BPG	PPG
2019–20	USC	31	8	20.3	**.474**	.286	.521	5.3	1.0	.6	.6	6.2
2020–21	USC	**32**	**32**	28.0	.472	**.436**	.545	7.3	1.6	.4	**.9**	9.9
2021–22	USC	**32**	**32**	**34.1**	.445	.352	**.682**	**8.3**	**3.3**	**.8**	**.9**	**14.2**
Career		95	72	27.5	.460	.360	.596	7.0	2.0	.6	.8	10.1

== Bahamas national team ==
Mobley has been an integral member of the Bahamas national team.

Mobley first appeared with the team at the 2025 FIBA AmeriCup, finishing in 11th place. He averaged 11 points, 6.3 rebounds, and 4.3 assists in three games, losing all three.

== Personal life ==
Mobley's father Eric played college basketball for Cal Poly Pomona and Portland and played professionally in China, Indonesia, Mexico, and Portugal. He later coached Amateur Athletic Union (AAU) basketball for 11 years. In 2018, he was hired as assistant basketball coach for USC. Mobley's younger brother Evan, with whom he played in high school and college, was drafted by the same NBA team (Cavaliers) one year before he was.
