= 2021–22 Arizona Wildcats men's basketball team =

American college basketball season

2021–22 Arizona Wildcats men's basketball

Pac-12 regular season & tournament champions Roman Main Event champions

NCAA tournament, Sweet Sixteen
- Conference: Pac-12 Conference

Ranking
- Coaches: No. 6
- AP: No. 2
- Record: 33–4 (18–2 Pac-12)
- Head coach: Tommy Lloyd (1st season)
- Associate head coach: Jack Murphy (3rd season)
- Assistant coaches: Riccardo Fois (1st season); Steve Robinson (1st season)
- Home arena: McKale Center

2021–22 Pac-12 Conference men's basketball standings
	Conf.				Overall
Team	W		L	PCT	W		L	PCT
No. 2 Arizona †	18	–	2	.900	33	–	4	.892
No. 11 UCLA	15	–	5	.750	27	–	8	.771
No. 22 USC	14	–	6	.700	26	–	8	.765
Colorado	12	–	8	.600	21	–	12	.636
Oregon	11	–	9	.550	20	–	15	.571
Washington	11	–	9	.550	17	–	15	.531
Washington State	11	–	9	.550	22	–	15	.595
Arizona State	10	–	10	.500	14	–	17	.452
Stanford	8	–	12	.400	16	–	16	.500
California	5	–	15	.250	12	–	20	.375
Utah	4	–	16	.200	11	–	20	.355
Oregon State	1	–	19	.050	3	–	28	.097
† Conference tournament winner Rankings from AP poll

The 2021–22 Arizona Wildcats men's basketball team represented the University of Arizona during the 2021–22 NCAA Division I men's basketball season. The team was led by Tommy Lloyd in his 1st season as a head coach. This was the Wildcats' 48th season at the on-campus McKale Center in Tucson, Arizona, and 43rd season as a member of the Pac-12 Conference. They finished with a record of 33–4, 18–2 in Pac-12 play to win the regular season and Pac-12 tournament championship. During the season, Arizona was invited and participated in the Roman Main Event in Paradise, Nevada. Arizona defeated Wichita State and Michigan to finish in a championship game. In the postseason, Arizona defeated Stanford, and Colorado and UCLA in the championship game of the 2022 Pac-12 Conference men's basketball tournament in Paradise, Nevada, their 8th overall. The Wildcats were invited and participated in the 2022 NCAA Division I men's basketball tournament, where they defeated Wright State and TCU in San Diego, California but lost to Houston in San Antonio, TX in the Sweet Sixteen.

== Previous season ==
The Wildcats finished the 2020–21 season 17–9, 11–9 in Pac-12 play to finish in fifth place. Due to a self-imposed one-year NCAA ban, the Wildcats did not participate in the Pac-12 tournament or the NCAA tournament.

On April 7, 2021, after 12 seasons and amid the continuing corruption scandal, the school fired head coach Sean Miller.

== Offseason ==
=== Coaching changes ===
Miller was fired on April 7, 2021, claiming the program has incredibly high standards to have success on and off the court. Following Sean Miller's departure from Arizona, Arizona hired longtime Gonzaga assistant coach Tommy Lloyd.

==== Departures ====
Arizona coaching changes
Name	Alma mater	Previous position	New position
Sean Miller	Pittsburgh (1992)	Head coach	Xavier
Danny Peters	Ohio State (2010)	Assistant coach	Assistant coach (Xavier)
Jason Terry	Arizona (1999)	Assistant coach	Head coach (Grand Rapids Gold – NBA G League)
Justin Coleman	Arizona (2019)	Graduate assistant	Assistant coach (Tennessee Tech)
Anthony Richards	Le Moyne College (2018)	Director of student-athlete development	Director of men's basketball operations (Holy Cross)
David Miller	Arizona (2015)	Recruiting coordinator	Assistant coach (San Jose State)

==== Additions to staff ====
Arizona coaching changes
Name	Alma mater	Previous position	New position
Tommy Lloyd	Whitman (1998)	Associate head coach (Gonzaga)	Arizona (head coach)
Riccardo Fois	Pepperdine (2008)	Director of player development (Phoenix Suns)	Arizona (assistant coach)
Steve Robinson	Radford (1981)	Assistant coach (North Carolina)	Arizona (assistant coach)

=== Transfers ===
Due to COVID-19, the NCAA ruled in October 2020 that the 2020–21 season would not count against the eligibility of any basketball player, thus giving all players the option to return in 2021–22. Additionally, any players who had declared for the 2021 NBA draft—including seniors, who must opt into this year's draft—had the option to return if they made a timely withdrawal from the draft and ended any pre-draft relationships with agents. Thus, separate lists would initially be maintained for confirmed and potential departures.

Outgoing transfers

Arizona outcoming transfers
Name	Number	Pos.	Height	Weight	Year	Hometown	Source
Terrell Brown Jr.		G	6'3"	185	Graduate senior	Seattle, WA	Elected to transfer to Washington
Ira Lee		F	6'8"	245	Senior	Los Angeles, CA	Graduate transfer to George Washington
Matt Weyand		F	6'5"	200	Senior	Irvine, CA	Walk-on; graduate transfer to Concordia
Jemarl Baker Jr.		G	6'5"	195	Redshirt junior	Menifee, CA	Elected to transfer to Fresno State
Jordan Brown		F	6'11"	235	Redshirt junior	Roseville, CA	Elected to transfer to Louisiana Lafayette
James Akinjo		G	6'1"	185	Junior	Oakland, CA	Elected to transfer to Baylor
Tibet Görener		F	6'9"	200	Freshman	Istanbul, Turkey	Elected to transfer to San Jose State
Daniel Batcho		F	6'11"	245	Freshman	Paris, France	Elected to transfer to Texas Tech

Incoming transfers

Arizona incoming transfers
Name	Number	Pos.	Height	Weight	Year	Hometown	Previous school	Years Remaining (Note: Due to a special NCAA ruling, the 2020–21 season did not count against the eligibility of players in all NCAA winter sports, including basketball.)	Source
Oumar Ballo		C	7'0"	260	RS freshman	Koulikoro, Mali	Gonzaga	3	Transfer from Gonzaga in April 2021. Eligible due to an NCAA transfer waiver.
Pelle Larsson		G	6'5"	215	Freshman	Nacka, Sweden	Utah	3	Transfer from Utah in May 2021. Eligible due to an NCAA transfer waiver.
Justin Kier		6'4"	190	G	Grad senior	Grottoes, Virginia	Georgia	1	Transfer from Georgia in May 2021. Eligible due to an NCAA transfer waiver.
Kim Aiken Jr.		G	6'7	245	RS senior	Redlands, CA	Eastern Washington	1	Transfer from Eastern Washington in April 2021

=== 2021 recruiting class ===
Shane Nowell, originally from Sammamish, WA, was the first commit of the 2021 recruiting class. He verbally committed to Arizona on October 31, 2020, over rivals Montana, Montana State, Oklahoma and Washington. Nowell was a consensus four-star prospect out of Eastside Catholic in Sammamish.

Adama Bal, from Paris, FR, was the third commit of the 2021 recruiting class. He verbally committed to Arizona on May 11, 2021, over Colorado, Cincinnati, Georgia, Marquette, San Francisco and Saint Mary's. Bal was out of INSEP Paris, France.

On April 24, 2021, Will Reeves announced that he would join the Wildcats as a preferred walk-on during the fall as a forward. On June 14, 2021, Addison Arnold announced that he would join the Wildcats as a preferred walk-on during the fall as a guard. On June 24, 2021, Benjamin Ackerley announced that he would join the Wildcats as a preferred walk-on during the fall as a guard.

College recruiting
Name	Hometown	School	Height	Weight	Commit date
Shane Nowell; G	Sammamish, WA	Eastside Catholic School	6 ft 5 in (1.96 m)	185 lb (84 kg)	Oct 31, 2020
Shane Nowell; G	Recruit ratings: Rivals: 247Sports: ESPN: (84)				
Adama Bal; F	Paris, FR	INSEP Paris	6 ft 6 in (1.98 m)	180 lb (82 kg)	May 11, 2021
Adama Bal; F	Recruit ratings: No ratings found				
Overall recruit ranking: Rivals: #27 247Sports: #23 On3: #- ESPN: #20
Note: In many cases, Scout, Rivals, 247Sports, On3, and ESPN may conflict in their listings of height and weight.; In these cases, the average was taken. ESPN grades are on a 100-point scale.; Sources: "Arizona 2021 Basketball Commitments". Rivals.; "2021 Arizona Wildcats Recruiting Class". ESPN.; "2021 Team Ranking". Rivals.; "2021 Arizona 24/7 Sports Commits". 247Sports.; "2021–22 Arizona Wildcats men's basketball team". On3.

=== 2022 recruiting class ===
College recruiting (2022)
Name	Hometown	School	Height	Weight	Commit date
Dylan Anderson; C	Gilbert, AZ	Perry High School	6 ft 11 in (2.11 m)	215 lb (98 kg)	Apr 16, 2021
Dylan Anderson; C	Recruit ratings: Rivals: 247Sports: ESPN: (82)				
Filip Borovićanin; G	Belgrade, Serbia	KK Beko	6 ft 8 in (2.03 m)	200 lb (91 kg)	Apr 19, 2022
Filip Borovićanin; G	Recruit ratings: No ratings found				
Henri Veesaar; F	Tallinn, Estonia	Real Madrid	6 ft 11 in (2.11 m)	200 lb (91 kg)	May 20, 2022
Henri Veesaar; F	Recruit ratings: 247Sports:				
Overall recruit ranking: Rivals: 10 247Sports: 10 ESPN: 10
Note: In many cases, Scout, Rivals, 247Sports, On3, and ESPN may conflict in their listings of height and weight.; In these cases, the average was taken. ESPN grades are on a 100-point scale.; Sources: "Arizona 2022 Basketball Commitments". Rivals.; "2022 Arizona Wildcats Recruiting Class". ESPN.; "2022 Team Ranking". Rivals.; "2022 Arizona 24/7 Sports Commits". 247Sports.

=== 2023 recruiting class ===
College recruiting (2023)
Name	Hometown	School	Height	Weight	Commit date
Kylan Boswell; PG	Chandler, AZ	Compass Prep	6 ft 1 in (1.85 m)	180 lb (82 kg)	Feb 28, 2022
Kylan Boswell; PG	Recruit ratings: Rivals: 247Sports: ESPN: (90)				
KJ Lewis; SG	El Paso, TX	Chapin High School	6 ft 4 in (1.93 m)	185 lb (84 kg)	Mar 9, 2022
KJ Lewis; SG	Recruit ratings: Rivals: 247Sports: ESPN: (84)				
Overall recruit ranking:
Note: In many cases, Scout, Rivals, 247Sports, On3, and ESPN may conflict in their listings of height and weight.; In these cases, the average was taken. ESPN grades are on a 100-point scale.; Sources: "Arizona 2023 Basketball Commitments". Rivals.; "2023 Arizona Wildcats Recruiting Class". ESPN.; "2023 Team Ranking". Rivals.; "2023 Arizona 24/7 Sports Commits". 247Sports.

== Personnel ==
=== Roster ===
2021–22 Arizona Wildcats men's basketball team
Players
Coaches

Pos.	#	Name	Height	Weight	Year	Previous school	Hometown
G	0	Bennedict Mathurin	6 ft 6 in (1.98 m)	210 lb (95 kg)	So	NBA Academy Latin America (MX)	Montreal, QC, Canada
G	1	Shane Nowell	6 ft 6 in (1.98 m)	210 lb (95 kg)	Fr	Eastside Catholic	Seattle, WA
G	2	Adama Bal	6 ft 6 in (1.98 m)	190 lb (86 kg)	Fr	INSEP Paris	Le Mans, France
G	3	Pelle Larsson	6 ft 5 in (1.96 m)	215 lb (98 kg)	So	Utah	Nacka, Sweden
G	4	Dalen Terry	6 ft 7 in (2.01 m)	195 lb (88 kg)	So	Hillcrest Prep	Phoenix, AZ
G	5	Justin Kier	6 ft 4 in (1.93 m)	195 lb (88 kg)	GS	Georgia	Grottoes, VA
F	10	Ąžuolas Tubelis	6 ft 11 in (2.11 m)	245 lb (111 kg)	So	Rytas Vilnius	Vilnius, Lithuania
C	11	Oumar Ballo	7 ft 0 in (2.13 m)	260 lb (118 kg)	RS So	Gonzaga	Koulikoro, Mali
F	20	Tautvilas Tubelis	6 ft 7 in (2.01 m)	220 lb (100 kg)	So	Rytas Vilnius	Vilnius, Lithuania
G	22	Addison Arnold (W)	6 ft 3 in (1.91 m)	185 lb (84 kg)	Fr	Royal HS	Simi Valley, CA
G	25	Kerr Kriisa	6 ft 3 in (1.91 m)	180 lb (82 kg)	So	Žalgiris	Tartu, Estonia
C	35	Christian Koloko	7 ft 1 in (2.16 m)	230 lb (104 kg)	Jr	Sierra Canyon	Douala, Cameroon
G	44	Ben Ackerley (W)	6 ft 1 in (1.85 m)	170 lb (77 kg)	Fr	Eastside Prep	Seattle, WA
F	50	Jordan Mains (W)	6 ft 6 in (1.98 m)	200 lb (91 kg)	Jr	Pinnacle HS	Scottsdale, AZ
F	51	Will Menaugh (W)	6 ft 10 in (2.08 m)	245 lb (111 kg)	Fr	Catalina Foothills HS	Tucson, AZ
G	53	Grant Weitman (W)	6 ft 4 in (1.93 m)	205 lb (93 kg)	So	Salpointe Catholic HS	Tucson, AZ
G	55	Will Reeves (W)	6 ft 3 in (1.91 m)	195 lb (88 kg)	Fr	Gonzaga Prep	Spokane, WA

Head coach

- Tommy Lloyd (Whitman)

Assistant coach(es)

- Jack Murphy (Arizona)
- Riccardo Fois (Pepperdine)
- Steve Robinson (Radford)

Legend

- (C) Team captain
- (S) Suspended
- (I) Ineligible
- (W) Walk-on
- Injured
- Current redshirt

Roster

- On December 8, senior forward Kim Aiken Jr. was out due to an undisclosed personal issue. A timeline for his return to the court for the 2021–22 season was undetermined at the time.
- Since February 23, Aiken had not been listed on the Arizona basketball roster.

=== Depth chart ===
Pos.	Starting 5	Bench 1	Bench 2	Bench 3
C	Christian Koloko	Oumar Ballo
PF	Ąžuolas Tubelis		Kim Aiken Jr	Tautvilas Tubelis
SF	Bennedict Mathurin	Pelle Larsson	Shane Nowell
SG	Dalen Terry	Justin Kier	Adama Bal	Jordan Mains
PG	Kerr Kriisa

== Preseason ==
=== Lute Olson tribute ===
The University of Arizona men's basketball program held a public tribute at the McKale Center on September 12, 2021 for former head coach Lute Olson. The hall of fame coach spent 25 seasons at Arizona before retiring in 2008. Former players Steve Kerr, Jason Terry, Andre Iguodala and Matt Brase all spoke.

=== Red and Blue game ===
The annual Red-Blue game took place at McKale Center on October 2, 2021. Christian Koloko, Bennedict Mathurin, Dalen Terry, and Ąžuolas Tubelis participated in the dunk contest, which was won by Terry with a perfect score of 120. The roster was split into two teams, Red versus Blue, with the Red team winning 53−39. Aiken Jr., led the team with 20 points, going 8-for-10 from the field and 4-for-4 from the three with four rebounds. Azuolas Tubelis had 14 points, going 7-for-7 with seven rebounds and two assists. Mathurin scored 16 points, shooting 6-for-12 from the field and 3-for-4 from the free throw line. Koloko finished with 10 points, four rebounds, and four blocks.

=== Preseason rankings ===
- Arizona received a T-4th with Oregon State in the PAC-12 Preseason poll.
- Arizona received 26 votes in the AP poll but was ranked outside the top 25.
- Arizona received 8 votes in the Coaches Poll but was ranked outside the top 25.

=== Preseason awards watchlists ===
- Bennedict Mathurin — Jerry West Award Watch List
- Ąžuolas Tubelis ― Karl Malone Award Watch List

=== Preseason All Pac-12 teams ===
- Bennedict Mathurin ― 1st Team
- Ąžuolas Tubelis ― 2nd Team

== Schedule and results ==
The Wildcats finalized their schedule in the summer; dates and times were finalized in the fall. Arizona hosted Cal Baptist, NAU, Northern Colorado, North Dakota State, Sacramento State, Texas–Rio Grande Valley, and Wyoming at McKale Center in Tucson, AZ. Arizona played the 2021 Roman Main Event in Las Vegas with Michigan, UNLV and Wichita State. They played two true road games against Illinois and Tennessee, that were canceled the previous season (including not play against Gonzaga in the 2021–22 season). The Pac-12 continued with its 20-game conference schedule, with 10 home and away games per school. Arizona did not play against Washington State at home and Oregon on the road.

Date time, TV	Rank^{#}	Opponent^{#}	Result	Record	High points	High rebounds	High assists	Site (attendance) city, state
Exhibition
Nov. 1, 2021; 7:00 p.m., P12N		Eastern New Mexico	W 96–50		18 – Mathurin	10 – Koloko	4 – 2 tied	McKale Center (10,540); Tucson, AZ
Regular season
Nov. 9, 2021; 8:30 p.m., P12N		Northern Arizona	W 81–52	1–0	17 – K. Kriisa	9 – O. Ballo	7 – D. Terry	McKale Center (12,471); Tucson, AZ
Nov. 12, 2021; 7:00 p.m., P12N		Texas–Rio Grande Valley	W 104–50	2–0	20 – A. Tubelis	11 – C. Koloko	5 – 2 tied	McKale Center (11,862); Tucson, AZ
Nov. 16, 2021; 7:00 p.m., P12N		North Dakota State; Roman Main Event Campus Game	W 97–45	3–0	16 – C. Koloko	8 – B. Mathurin	4 – B. Mathurin	McKale Center (12,059); Tucson, AZ
Nov. 19, 2021; 8:00 p.m., ESPNU		vs. Wichita State; Roman Main Event Semifinal	W 82–78 ^{OT}	4–0	25 – B. Mathurin	11 – C. Koloko	6 – K. Kriisa	T-Mobile Arena (–); Paradise, NV
Nov. 21, 2021; 7:30 p.m., ESPN		vs. No. 4 Michigan; Roman Main Event Championship	W 80–62	5–0	22 – C. Koloko	8 – A. Tubelis	7 – K. Kriisa	T-Mobile Arena (–); Paradise, NV
Nov. 27, 2021; 5:30 p.m., P12N	No. 17	Sacramento State	W 105–59	6–0	22 – A. Tubelis	7 – 2 tied	9 – K. Kriisa	McKale Center (11,733); Tucson, AZ
Dec. 5, 2021; 2:00 p.m., ESPNU	No. 11	at Oregon State	W 90–65	7–0 (1–0)	29 – B. Mathurin	6 – 2 tied	5 – 2 tied	Gill Coliseum (3,918); Corvallis, OR
Dec. 8, 2021; 8:00 p.m., P12N	No. 11	Wyoming	W 94–65	8–0	24 – B. Mathurin	10 – B. Mathurin	5 – 3 tied	McKale Center (13,077); Tucson, AZ
Dec. 11, 2021; 3:00 p.m., FOX	No. 11	at Illinois	W 83–79	9–0	30 – B. Mathurin	8 – 2 tied	5 – K. Kriisa	State Farm Center (15,544); Champaign, IL
Dec. 15, 2021; 7:00 p.m., P12N	No. 8	Northern Colorado	W 101–76	10–0	19 – C. Koloko	9 – B. Mathurin	7 – A. Tubelis	McKale Center (11,943); Tucson, AZ
Dec. 18, 2021; 4:00 p.m., P12N	No. 8	Cal Baptist	W 84–60	11–0	19 – A. Tubelis	10 – 2 tied	5 – 2 tied	McKale Center (14,263); Tucson, AZ
Dec. 22, 2021; 5:00 p.m., ESPN2	No. 6	at No. 19 Tennessee	L 73–77	11–1	28 – B. Mathurin	8 – B. Mathurin	5 – B. Mathurin	Thompson–Boling Arena (20,408); Knoxville, TN
Jan. 3, 2022; 6:00 p.m., P12N	No. 8	Washington; Rescheduled from Dec. 2	W 95–79	12–1 (2–0)	27 – B. Mathurin	11 – D. Terry	8 – D. Terry	McKale Center (12,496); Tucson, AZ
Jan. 13, 2022; 9:00 p.m., FS1	No. 6	Colorado	W 76–55	13–1 (3–0)	14 – 2 tied	10 – C. Koloko	10 – K. Kriisa	McKale Center (13,515); Tucson, AZ
Jan. 15, 2022; 6:00 p.m., P12N	No. 6	Utah	W 82–64	14–1 (4–0)	32 – A. Tubelis	8 – A. Tubelis	7 – J. Kier	McKale Center (14,164); Tucson, AZ
Jan. 20, 2022; 9:00 p.m., ESPNU	No. 3	at Stanford	W 85–57	15–1 (5–0)	21 – O. Ballo	9 – D. Terry	7 – K. Kriisa	Maples Pavilion (100); Stanford, CA
Jan. 23, 2022; 1:00 p.m., P12N	No. 3	at California	W 96–71	16–1 (6–0)	19 – C. Koloko	14 – C. Koloko	4 – B. Mathurin	Haas Pavilion (7,582); Berkeley, CA
Jan. 25, 2022; 9:00 p.m., ESPN	No. 3	at No. 7 UCLA; Rivalry/Rescheduled from Dec. 30	L 59–75	16–2 (6–1)	16 – B. Mathurin	10 – B. Mathurin	6 – K. Kriisa	Pauley Pavilion (11,268); Los Angeles, CA
Jan. 29, 2022; 12:30 p.m., CBS	No. 3	Arizona State; Rivalry	W 67–56	17–2 (7–1)	14 – 2 tied	13 – C. Koloko	3 – 2 tied	McKale Center (14,644); Tucson, AZ
Feb. 3, 2022; 6:00 p.m., ESPN	No. 7	No. 3 UCLA; Rivalry	W 76–66	18–2 (8–1)	16 – K. Kriisa	9 – O. Ballo	7 – D. Terry	McKale Center (14,644); Tucson, AZ
Feb. 5, 2022; 3:00 p.m., FOX	No. 7	No. 19 USC	W 72–63	19–2 (9–1)	18 – A. Tubelis	11 – A. Tubelis	4 – D. Terry	McKale Center (14,644); Tucson, AZ
Feb. 7, 2022; 7:00 p.m., FS1	No. 4	at Arizona State; Rivalry/Rescheduled from Jan. 8	W 91–79	20–2 (10–1)	19 – A. Tubelis	11 – A. Tubelis	5 – K. Kriisa	Desert Financial Arena (13,233); Tempe, AZ
Feb. 10, 2022; 7:00 p.m., FS1	No. 4	at Washington State	W 72–60	21–2 (11–1)	20 – B. Mathurin	12 – D. Terry	5 – D. Terry	Beasley Coliseum (5,012); Pullman, WA
Feb. 12, 2022; 4:00 p.m., P12N	No. 4	at Washington	W 92–68	22–2 (12–1)	25 – B. Mathurin	10 – A. Tubelis	7 – D. Terry	Alaska Airlines Arena (8,503); Seattle, WA
Feb. 17, 2022; 5:30 p.m., P12N	No. 3	Oregon State	W 83–69	23–2 (13–1)	22 – A. Tubelis	9 – C. Koloko	6 – K. Kriisa	McKale Center (12,905); Tucson, AZ
Feb. 19, 2022; 8:00 p.m., ESPN	No. 3	Oregon; College GameDay	W 84–81	24–2 (14–1)	24 – B. Mathurin	8 – C. Koloko	6 – D. Terry	McKale Center (14,644); Tucson, AZ
Feb. 24, 2022; 9:00 p.m., FS1	No. 2	at Utah	W 97–77	25–2 (15–1)	23 – A. Tubelis	10 – K. Kriisa	10 – K. Kriisa	Jon M. Huntsman Center (8,263); Salt Lake City, UT
Feb. 26, 2022; 6:00 p.m., ESPN2	No. 2	at Colorado	L 63–79	25–3 (15–2)	13 – A. Tubelis	8 – A. Tubelis	5 – K. Kriisa	CU Events Center (11,079); Boulder, CO
Mar. 1, 2022; 9:00 p.m., ESPN	No. 2	at No. 16 USC; Rescheduled from Jan. 2	W 91–71	26–3 (16–2)	19 – B. Mathurin	6 – 2 tied	6 – B. Mathurin	Galen Center (10,258); Los Angeles, CA
Mar. 3, 2022; 7:00 p.m., ESPN2	No. 2	Stanford	W 81–69	27–3 (17–2)	24 – B. Mathurin	10 – C. Koloko	7 – K. Kriisa	McKale Center (14,382); Tucson, AZ
Mar. 5, 2022; 3:00 p.m., P12N	No. 2	California	W 89–61	28–3 (18–2)	16 – O. Ballo	6 – B. Mathurin	3 – 4 tied	McKale Center (14,644); Tucson, AZ
Pac-12 tournament
March 10, 2022; 1:00 p.m., P12N	(1) No. 2	vs. (9) Stanford; Quarterfinals	W 84–80	29–3	24 – C. Koloko	9 – C. Koloko	5 – 2 tied	T-Mobile Arena (11,081); Paradise, NV
March 11, 2022; 7:00 p.m., P12N	(1) No. 2	vs. (4) Colorado semifinals	W 82–72	30–3	20 – A. Tubelis	11 – A. Tubelis	3 – 4 tied	T-Mobile Arena (14,158); Paradise, NV
March 12, 2022; 7:00 p.m., FOX	(1) No. 2	vs. (2) No. 13 UCLA; Championship/Rivalry	W 84–76	31–3	27 – Mathurin	10 – Koloko	7 – 2 tied	T-Mobile Arena (14,401); Paradise, NV
NCAA tournament
March 18, 2022*; 4:27 p.m., TruTV	(1 S) No. 2	vs. (16 S) Wright State; First Round	W 87–70	32–3	18 – B. Mathurin	13 – C. Koloko	6 – 2 tied	Viejas Arena (11,399); San Diego, CA
March 20, 2022*; 6:40 p.m., TBS	(1 S) No. 2	vs. (9 S) TCU; Second Round	W 85–80 ^{OT}	33–3	30 – B. Mathurin	12 – C. Koloko	5 – D. Terry	Viejas Arena (11,425); San Diego, CA
March 24, 2022*; 6:59 p.m., TBS	(1 S) No. 2	vs. (5 S) No. 15 Houston; Sweet Sixteen	L 60–72	33–4	17 – D. Terry	6 – 2 tied	3 – 2 tied	AT&T Center (17,357); San Antonio, TX
*Non-conference game. ^{#}Rankings from AP Poll. (#) Tournament seedings in parentheses. S=South. All times are in Mountain Time.

== Pac-12 tournament ==
In the Pac-12 tournament as a #1-seed, the Wildcats faced off against #9-seed Stanford, whom they defeated 84-80 in the quarterfinals. They faced off against #4-seed Colorado, whom they defeated 82-72 in the semifinals. They faced off against #2-seed UCLA defeated 84-76 in the title game to win their 8th Pac-12 conference tournament title in Paradise, Nevada.

== NCAA tournament ==
Arizona entered the NCAA tournament as a #1-seed (South Region), facing off against #16-seed Wright State. Arizona won 87–70. Furthermore, Arizona’s victory against Wright State marked their first win in the NCAA tournament since 2017. In the round of 32, Arizona faced off against #9-seed TCU, and won 85–80 in the overtime thriller. In the sweet sixteen, Arizona faced off against #5-seed Houston but lost 60–72, ending their season.

== Game summaries ==
This section will be filled in as the season progresses.

=== Northern Arizona ===
P12N

November 9
8:30 p.m.

Northern Arizona Lumberjacks 52, Arizona Wildcats 81
Scoring by half: 22-42, 30-39
Pts: Carson Towt, 11; Rebs: Carson Towt, 9 Asts: 2 tied, 3	Pts: Kerr Kriisa, 17; Rebs: Oumar Ballo, 9 Asts: Dalen Terry, 7

McKale Center, Tucson, AZ
Attendance: 12,421
Referees: Mike Reed, Marc Beasley, Ryan McDaniel

=== Texas–Rio Grande Valley ===
P12N

November 12
7:00 p.m.

Texas–Rio Grande Valley Vaqueros 50, Arizona Wildcats 104
Scoring by half: 24-49, 26-55
Pts: Ricky Nelson, 14; Rebs: Mike Adewunmi, 7 Asts: R. Nelson, 3	Pts: Ąžuolas Tubelis, 20; Rebs: Christian Koloko, 11; Asts: 2 tied, 5

McKale Center, Tucson, AZ
Attendance: 11,862
Referees: Shawn Lehigh, Scott Brown, Frank Harvey III

=== North Dakota State ===
P12N

November 16
7:00 p.m.

NDSU Bison 45, Arizona Wildcats 97
Scoring by half: 23-44, 22-53
Pts: Jarius Cook, 10; Rebs: Andrew Morgan, 8 Asts: Tyree Eady, 3	Pts: Christian Koloko, 16; Rebs: Bennedict Mathurin, 8 Asts: Bennedict Mathurin, 4

McKale Center, Tucson, AZ
Attendance: 12,059
Referees: Randy McCall, Michael Greenstein, Jeff Wooten

=== vs Wichita State ===
ESPNU

November 19
8:00 p.m.

Wichita State Shockers 78, Arizona Wildcats 82 (OT)
Scoring by half: 32-40, 37-29 Overtime: 9-13
Pts: Tyson Etienne, 27; Rebs: Craig Porter Jr., 7 Asts: Dexter Dennis, 6	Pts: Bennedict Mathurin, 25; Rebs: Christian Koloko, 11; Asts: Kerr Kriisa, 6

T-Mobile Arena, Las Vegas, NV
Referees: Doug Sirman, Darron George, Marques Pettigrew

=== vs No. 4 Michigan ===
ESPN

November 21
7:30 p.m.

No. 4 Michigan Wolverines 62, Arizona Wildcats 80
Scoring by half: 29-37, 24-43
Pts: Eli Brooks, 14; Rebs: Hunter Dickinson, 7 Asts: 3 tied, 2	Pts: Christian Koloko, 22; Rebs: Ąžuolas Tubelis, 8 Asts: Kerr Kriisa, 7

T-Mobile Arena, Las Vegas, NV
Referees: Doug Sirmons, Tony Padilla, Paul Szelc

=== Sacramento State ===
P12N

November 27
5:30 p.m.

Sacramento State Hornets 59, No. 17 Arizona Wildcats 105
Scoring by half: 22-47, 37-58
Pts: Cameron Wilbon, 14; Rebs: Bryce Fowler, 7 Asts: 3 tied, 2	Pts: Ąžuolas Tubelis, 22; Rebs: 2 tied, 7 Asts: Kerr Kriisa, 9

McKale Center, Tucson, AZ
Attendance: 11,733
Referees: Michael Greenstein, Deldre Carr, Ryan Holmes

=== At Oregon State ===
P12N

December 5
2:00 p.m.

No. 11 Arizona Wildcats 90, Oregon State Beavers 65
Scoring by half: 44-36, 46-29
Pts: Bennedict Mathurin, 29; Rebs: 2 tied, 6 Asts: 2 tied, 5	Pts: Jarod Lucas, 17; Rebs: Warith Alatishe, 9 Asts: Dashawn Davis, 8

Gill Coliseum, Corvallis, OR
Attendance: 3,918
Referees: Randy McCall, Tony Padilla, Frank Harvey III

=== Wyoming ===
P12N

December 8
8:00 p.m.

Wyoming Cowboys 65, No. 11 Arizona Wildcats 94
Scoring by half: 22-53, 43-41
Pts: Xavier Dusell, 22; Rebs: 4 tied, 4 Asts: Hunter Maldonado, 4	Pts: Bennedict Mathurin, 24; Rebs: Bennedict Mathurin, 10; Asts: 3 tied, 5

McKale Center, Tucson, AZ
Attendance: 13,077
Referees: Verne Harris, Deldre Carr, Rick O'Neill

=== At Illinois ===
FOX

December 11
3:00 p.m.

No. 11 Arizona Wildcats 83, Illinois Fighting Illini 79
Scoring by half: 38-42, 46-37
Pts: Bennedict Mathurin, 30; Rebs: 2 tied, 8 Asts: Kerr Kriisa, 5	Pts: Trent Frazier, 27; Rebs: Kofi Cockburn, 13; Asts: 3 tied, 3

State Farm Center, Champaign, IL
Attendance: 15,544
Referees: Bo Boroski, Kelly Pfeifer, Lewis Garrison

=== Northern Colorado ===
P12N

December 15
7:00 p.m.

Northern Colorado Bears 76, No. 8 Arizona Wildcats 101
Scoring by half: 42-52, 34-49
Pts: Daylen Kountz, 33; Rebs: Kur Jongkuch; Asts: Matt Johnson, 4	Pts: Christian Koloko, 19; Rebs: Bennedict Mathurin, 9 Asts: Ąžuolas Tubelis, 7

McKale Center, Tucson, AZ
Attendance: 11,943
Referees: Tony Padilla, Larry Spaulding, Frank Harvey III

=== California Baptist ===
P12N

December 18
4:00 p.m.

California Baptist Lancers 60, No. 8 Arizona Wildcats 84
Scoring by half: 33-40, 27-44
Pts: 2 tied, 11; Rebs: Elijah Thomas, 4 Asts: Taran Armstrong, 4	Pts: Ąžuolas Tubelis, 19; Rebs: 2 tied, 10; Asts: 2 tied, 5

McKale Center, Tucson, AZ
Attendance: 14,263
Referees: Nate Harris, Gerry Pollard, Mike Reed

=== At Tennessee ===
ESPN2

December 22
5:00 p.m.

No. 6 Arizona Wildcats 73, No. 19 Tennessee Volunteers 77
Scoring by half: 21-34, 52 -43
Pts: Bennedict Mathurin, 28; Rebs: Bennedict Mathurin, 8 Asts: Bennedict Mathurin, 5	Pts: John Fulkerson, 24; Rebs: John Fulkerson, 10; Asts: Kennedy Chandler, 4

Thompson–Boling Arena, Knoxville, TN
Attendance: 20,408
Referees: Tony Greene, Terry Wymer, Patrick Evans

=== Washington ===
P12N

January 3
6:00 p.m.

Washington Huskies 79, No. 8 Arizona Wildcats 95
Scoring by half: 41-49, 38-46
Pts: Terrell Brown Jr., 26; Rebs: Terrell Brown Jr., 8 Asts: Terrell Brown Jr., 6	Pts: Bennedict Mathurin, 27; Rebs: Dalen Terry, 11; Asts: Dalen Terry, 8

McKale Center, Tucson, AZ
Attendance: 12,496
Referees: Deron White, Randy Richardson, Scott Brown

=== Colorado ===
FS1

January 13
9:00 p.m.

Colorado Buffaloes 56, No. 6 Arizona Wildcats 76
Scoring by half: 28-32, 27-44
Pts: K.J. Simpson, 17; Rebs: Evan Battey, 7 Asts: K.J. Simpson, 4	Pts: 2 tied, 14; Rebs: Christian Koloko, 9 Asts: Kerr Kriisa, 10

McKale Center, Tucson, AZ
Attendance: 13,515
Referees: John Higgins, Verne Harris, Nate Harris

=== Utah ===
P12N

January 15
6:00 p.m.

Utah Utes 64, No. 6 Arizona Wildcats 82
Scoring by half: 31-34, 33-48
Pts: Both Gach, 12; Rebs: Riley Battin, 8 Asts: 2 tied, 2	Pts: Ąžuolas Tubelis, 32; Rebs: Ąžuolas Tubelis, 8 Asts: Justin Kier, 7

McKale Center, Tucson, AZ
Attendance: 14,164
Referees: Greg Nixon, Tom Spitznagel, Ryan McDaniel

=== At Stanford ===
ESPNU

January 20
9:00 p.m.

No. 3 Arizona Wildcats 85, Stanford Cardinal 57
Scoring by half: 42-31, 43-26
Pts: Oumar Ballo, 21; Rebs: Dalen Terry, 9 Asts: Kerr Kriisa, 7	Pts: 2 tied, 9 Rebs: Harrison Ingram, 7 Asts: Michael O’Connell, 3

Maples Pavilion, Stanford, CA
Attendance: 100
Referees: Mike Reed, Kevin Brill, Casey McClellan

=== At California ===
P12N

January 23
1:00 p.m.

No. 3 Arizona Wildcats 96, California Golden Bears 71
Scoring by half: 48-27, 48-44
Pts: Christian Koloko, 19; Rebs: Christian Koloko, 14; Asts: Bennedict Mathurin, 4	Pts: Jordan Sheperd, 21; Rebs: Andre Kelly, 8 Asts: Jordan Sheperd, 4

Haas Pavilion, Berkeley, CA
Attendance: 7,582
Referees: David Hall, Larry Spaulding, D.G. Nelson

=== At UCLA ===
ESPN

January 25
9:00 p.m.

No. 3 Arizona Wildcats 59, No. 7 UCLA Bruins 75
Scoring by half: 29-40, 30-35
Pts: Bennedict Mathurin, 16; Rebs: Bennedict Mathurin, 10; Asts: Kerr Kriisa, 6	Pts: 2 tied, 15; Rebs: Jules Bernard, 7 Asts: 2 tied, 3

Pauley Pavilion, Los Angeles, CA
Attendance: 11,268
Referees: John Higgins, Mike Scyphers, Nate Harris

=== Arizona State ===
CBS

January 29
12:30 p.m.

Arizona State Sun Devils 56, No. 3 Arizona Wildcats 67
Scoring by half: 32-32, 24-35
Pts: D.J. Horne, 17; Rebs: Kimani Lawrence, 6 Asts: Marreon Jackson, 4	Pts: 2 tied, 14; Rebs: C. Koloko, 13; Asts: 2 tied, 3

McKale Center, Tucson, AZ
Attendance: 14,644
Referees: Michael Greenstein, Greg Nixon, Kevin Brill

=== UCLA ===
ESPN

February 3
6:00 p.m.

No. 3 UCLA Bruins 66, No. 7 Arizona Wildcats 76
Scoring by half: 30-42, 36-34
Pts: Jules Bernard, 15; Rebs: Cody Riley, 8 Asts: 2 tied, 5	Pts: Kerr Kriisa, 16; Rebs: Oumar Ballo, 9 Asts: Dalen Terry, 7

McKale Center, Tucson, AZ
Attendance: 14,644
Referees: Dave Hall, Mike Reed, Paul Szelc

=== USC ===
FOX

February 5
3:00 p.m.

No. 19 USC Trojans 63, No. 7 Arizona Wildcats 72
Scoring by half: 28-29, 35-43
Pts: Isaiah Mobley, 15; Rebs: Drew Peterson, 8 Asts: 2 tied, 4	Pts: Ąžuolas Tubelis, 18; Rebs: Ąžuolas Tubelis, 11; Asts: Dalen Terry, 4

McKale Center, Tucson, AZ
Attendance: 14,644
Referees: Tony Padilla, Verne Harris, Eric Curry

=== At Arizona State ===
FS1

February 7
7:00 p.m.

No. 4 Arizona Wildcats 91, Arizona State Sun Devils 79
Scoring by half: 40-36, 51-40
Pts: Ąžuolas Tubelis, 19; Rebs: Ąžuolas Tubelis, 11; Asts: Kerr Kriisa, 5	Pts: 2 tied, 16; Rebs: 2 tied, 4 Asts: Marreon Jackson, 8

Desert Financial Arena, Tempe, AZ
Attendance: 13,233
Referees: Michael Greenstein, Deldre Carr, Kelly Pfeifer

=== At Washington State ===
FS1

February 10
7:00 p.m.

No. 4 Arizona Wildcats 72, Washington State Cougars 60
Scoring by half: 33-20, 39-40
Pts: Bennedict Mathurin, 20; Rebs: Dalen Terry, 12; Asts: Dalen Terry, 5	Pts: Michael Flowers, 16; Rebs: Efe Abogidi, 6 Asts: Michael Flowers, 3

Beasley Coliseum, Pullman, WA
Attendance: 5,012
Referees: John Higgins, Frank Harvey, Mike Scyphers

=== At Washington ===
P12N

February 12
4:00 p.m.

No. 4 Arizona Wildcats 92, Washington Huskies 68
Scoring by half: 45-36, 47-32
Pts: Bennedict Mathurin, 25; Rebs: Ąžuolas Tubelis, 10; Asts: Dalen Terry, 7	Pts: Terrell Brown Jr, 27; Rebs: Nate Roberts, 9 Asts: Terrell Brown Jr, 2

Alaska Airlines Arena, Seattle, WA
Attendance: 8,503
Referees: Nate Harris, Jeff Ketchu, Chad Shepard

=== Oregon State ===
P12N

February 17
5:30 p.m.

Oregon State Beavers 69, No. 3 Arizona Wildcats 83
Scoring by half: 42-44, 27-39
Pts: 2 tied, 13; Rebs: Maurice Callo, 8 Asts: Dashawn Davis, 7	Pts: Ąžuolas Tubelis, 22; Rebs: Christian Koloko, 9 Asts: Kerr Kriisa, 6

McKale Center, Tucson, AZ
Attendance: 12,905
Referees: Eric Curry, Paul Szelc, Ryan McDaniel

=== Oregon ===
ESPN

February 19
8:00 p.m.

Oregon Ducks 81, No. 3 Arizona Wildcats 84
Scoring by half: 47-45, 34-39
Pts: Will Richardson, 22; Rebs: N’Faly Dante, 15; Asts: Jacob Young, 5	Pts: Bennedict Mathurin, 24; Rebs: Christian Koloko, 8 Asts: Dalen Terry, 6

McKale Center, Tucson, AZ
Attendance: 14,644
Referees: Randy McCall, Verne Harris, Deron White

=== At Utah ===
FS1

February 24
9:00 p.m.

No. 2 Arizona Wildcats 97, Utah Utes 77
Scoring by half: 53-33, 44-44
Pts: Ąžuolas Tubelis, 23; Rebs: Kerr Kriisa, 10; Asts: Kerr Kriisa, 10	Pts: Gabe Madsen, 16; Rebs: David Jenkins Jr., 6 Asts: 2 tied, 3

Jon M. Huntsman Center, Salt Lake City, UT
Attendance: 8,263
Referees: Greg Nixon, Olandis Poole, Glen Mayberry

=== At Colorado ===
ESPN2

February 26
6:00 p.m.

No. 2 Arizona Wildcats 63, Colorado Buffaloes 79
Scoring by half: 37-32, 26-47
Pts: Ąžuolas Tubelis, 13; Rebs: Ąžuolas Tubelis, 8 Asts: Kerr Kriisa, 5	Pts: 2 tied, 15; Rebs: Jabari Walked, 14; Asts: 2 tied, 2

CU Events Center, Boulder, CO
Attendance: 11,079
Referees: Eric Curry, Deldre Carr, Bill Vinovich

=== At USC ===
ESPN

March 1
9:00 p.m.

No. 2 Arizona Wildcats 91, No. 16 USC Trojans 71
Scoring by half: 51-27, 40-44
Pts: Bennedict Mathurin, 19; Rebs: 2 tied, 6 Asts: Bennedict Mathurin, 6	Pts: Max Agonkpolo, 14; Rebs: Isaiah Mobley, 11; Asts: Drew Peterson, 4

Galen Center, Los Angeles, CA
Attendance: 10,258
Referees: Tony Padilla, Mike Schyphers, Larry Spaulding

=== Stanford ===
ESPN2

March 3
7:00 p.m.

Stanford Cardinal 69, No. 2 Arizona Wildcats 81
Scoring by half: 39-37, 32-44
Pts: Spencer Jones, 22; Rebs: Harrison Ingram, 9 Asts: Harrison Ingram, 5	Pts: Bennedict Mathurin, 24; Rebs: Christian Koloko, 10; Asts: Kerr Kriisa, 7

McKale Center, Tucson, AZ
Attendance: 14,382
Referees: Randy McCall, Mike Reed, Jim Schipper

=== California ===
P12N

March 5
3:00 p.m.

California Golden Bears 61, No. 2 Arizona Wildcats 89
Scoring by half: 31-40, 30-49
Pts: Jordan Shepherd, 16; Rebs: Grant Anticevich, 6 Asts: Lars Thiemann, 2	Pts: Oumar Ballo, 16; Rebs: Bennedict Mathurin, 6 Asts: 4 tied, 3

McKale Center, Tucson, AZ
Attendance: 14,644
Referees: Verne Harris, Deron White, Kurt Walker

=== Stanford (Pac-12 Quarterfinal) ===
P12N

March 10
1:00 p.m.

No. 9 Stanford Cardinals 80, No. 1 Arizona Wildcats 84
Scoring by half: 37−40, 43−44
Pts: Spencer Jones, 28; Rebs: Spencer Jones, 8 Asts: 2 tied, 4	Pts: Christian Koloko, 24; Rebs: Christian Koloko, 9 Asts: 2 tied, 5

T-Mobile Arena, Las Vegas, NV
Attendance: 11,081
Referees: Randy McCall, Frank Harvey III, Larry Spaulding

=== Colorado (Pac-12 Semifinal) ===
P12N

March 11
7:00 p.m.

No. 4 Colorado Buffaloes 72, No. 1 Arizona Wildcats 82
Scoring by half: 47–38, 35–34
Pts: Jabari Walker, 19; Rebs: Jabari Walker, 5 Asts: 2 tied, 5	Pts: Ąžuolas Tubelis, 20; Rebs: Ąžuolas Tubelis, 11; Asts: 4 tied, 3

T-Mobile Arena, Las Vegas, NV
Attendance: 14,158
Referees: Verne Harris, Tony Padilla, Mike Reed

=== UCLA (Pac-12 Final) ===
FOX

March 12
7:00 p.m.

No. 2 UCLA Bruins 76, No. 1 Arizona Wildcats 84
Scoring by half: 40–35, 36–49
Pts: Jules Bernard, 19; Rebs: Jaime Jaquez Jr., 10; Asts: Tyger Campbell, 4	Pts: Bennedict Mathurin, 27; Rebs: Christian Koloko, 10; Asts: 2 tied, 7

T-Mobile Arena, Las Vegas, NV
Attendance: 14,401
Referees: Randy McCall, Verne Harris, Tony Padilla

=== Wright State (round of 64) ===
TruTV

March 18
4:27 p.m.

No. 16 Wright State Raiders 70, No. 1 Arizona Wildcats 87
Scoring by half: 31-42, 39-45
Pts: Grant Basile, 21; Rebs: Time Finke, 6 Asts: Trey Calvin, 4	Pts: Bennedict Mathurin, 18; Rebs: Christian Koloko, 13; Asts: 2 tied , 6

Viejas Arena, San Diego, CA
Attendance: 11,399
Referees: Paul Szelc, Bill Covington, KB Burdett

=== TCU (round of 32) ===
TBS

March 20
6:40 p.m.

No. 9 TCU Horned Frogs 80, No. 1 Arizona Wildcats 85 (OT)
Scoring by half: 36-39, 39-36 Overtime: 5-10
Pts: Chuck O’Bannon, 23; Rebs: Eddie Lampkin, 14; Asts: Damion Baugh, 6	Pts: Bennedict Mathurin, 30; Rebs: Christian Koloko, 12; Asts: Dalen Terry, 5

Viejas Arena, San Diego, CA
Attendance: 11,425
Referees: Doug Shows, Keith Kimble, Eric Curry

=== Houston (Sweet 16) ===
TBS

March 24
6:45 p.m.

No. 5 Houston Cougars 72, No. 1 Arizona Wildcats 60
Scoring by half: 34-28, 38-32
Pts: Jamal Shead, 21; Rebs: Josh Carlton, 7 Asts: Kyler Edwards, 3	Pts: Dalen Terry, 17; Rebs: 2 tied, 6 Asts: 2 tied, 3

AT&T Center, San Antonio, TX
Attendance: 17,357
Referees: Terry Oglesby, Paul Szelc, Marques Pettigrew

== Rankings ==
Ranking movements Legend: ██ Increase in ranking ██ Decrease in ranking RV = Received votes т = Tied with team above or below ( ) = First-place votes
	Week																			
Poll	Pre	1	2	3	4	5	6	7	8	9	10	11	12	13	14	15	16	17	18	Final
AP	RV	RV	17	11	11	8	6 (1)	9	8	6	3	3 (1)	7	4	3	2	2	2 (6)	2 (7)	Not released
Coaches	RV	RV^	19	11	8	6	4т	7	7	6	3 (1)	3 (1)	5	5	4	2	3	2 (2)	2 (1)	6

*AP does not release post-NCAA tournament rankings.
^Coaches did not release a Week 2 poll.

== Player statistics ==
Individual player statistics (final)
			Minutes		Scoring		Total FGs			3-point FGs			Free-throws			Rebounds								
Player	GP	GS	Tot	Avg	Pts	Avg	FG	FGA	Pct	3FG	3FA	Pct	FT	FTA	Pct	Off	Def	Tot	Avg	A	PF	TO	Stl	Blk
Benjamin Ackerley	0	0	0	0.0	0	0.0	0	0	0%	0	0	0%	0	0	0%	0	0	0	0.0	0	0	0	0	0
Kim Aiken Jr.	7	0	96	13.7	35	5.0	13	27	48.1%	9	16	56.3%	0	2	0%	8	16	24	3.4	14	8	3	7	2
Addison Arnold	0	0	0	0.0	0	0.0	0	0	0%	0	0	0%	0	0	0%	0	0	0	0.0	0	0	0	0	0
Adama Bal	23	0	104	4.5	34	1.5	13	27	48.1%	8	17	47.1%	0	2	0%	2	8	10	0.4	10	10	7	3	1
Oumar Ballo	36	0	556	15.4	250	6.9	91	145	62.8%	0	0	0%	68	97	70.1%	58	105	163	4.5	21	57	32	12	44
Justin Kier	36	6	723	20.1	249	6.9	88	198	44.4%	34	95	35.8%	39	47	83.0%	11	102	113	3.1	82	47	49	23	1
Christian Koloko	36	36	909	25.3	456	12.7	181	282	64.2%	0	3	0%	94	128	73.4%	95	171	266	7.4	49	101	58	26	100
Kerr Kriisa	32	30	956	29.9	317	9.9	98	280	35.4%	79	231	34.2%	40	49	81.6%	15	65	80	2.5	154	55	70	19	3
Pelle Larsson	36	2	744	20.7	258	7.2	83	176	47.2%	32	89	36.0%	60	74	81.1%	28	93	121	3.4	65	89	56	27	8
Jordan Mains	15	0	30	2.0	10	0.7	3	7	42.9%	0	3	0%	4	6	66.7%	4	8	12	0.8	0	4	2	2	0
Bennedict Mathurin	36	36	1164	32.3	640	17.8	214	470	45.5%	81	218	37.2%	131	170	77.1%	49	155	204	5.7	91	64	65	36	10
Will Menaugh	0	0	0	0.0	0	0.0	0	0	0%	0	0	0%	0	0	0%	0	0	0	0.0	0	0	0	0	0
Shane Nowell	19	0	66	3.5	15	0.8	6	18	33.3%	1	5	20.0%	2	2	100.0%	0	15	15	0.8	6	9	8	4	2
Will Reeves	0	0	0	0.0	0	0.0	0	0	0%	0	0	0%	0	0	0%	0	0	0	0.0	0	0	0	0	0
Dalen Terry	36	36	991	27.5	280	7.8	109	220	49.5%	26	74	35.1%	36	49	73.5%	39	134	173	4.8	142	82	48	46	11
Ąžuolas Tubelis	35	34	862	24.6	497	14.2	196	355	55.2%	10	37	27.0%	95	143	66.4%	68	151	219	6.3	80	68	73	37	25
Tautvilas Tubelis	14	0	24	1.7	4	0.3	2	7	28.6%	0	3	0%	0	1	0%	0	0	0	0.0	0	1	3	0	0
Grant Weitman	16	0	25	1.6	2	0.1	1	3	33.3%	0	2	0%	0	0	0%	1	2	3	0.2	0	3	1	0	0
Total	36	–	7250	201.4	3047	84.64	1099	2215	49.6%	280	793	35.3%	569	770	73.9%	413	1083	1496	41.6	714	598	483	242	207
Opponents	36	–	7250	201.4	2446	67.94	905	2350	38.5%	264	813	32.5%	372	552	67.4%	429	783	1212	33.7	426	677	460	252	101

Legend
GP	Games played	GS	Games started	Avg	Average per game
FG	Field-goals made	FGA	Field-goal attempts	Off	Offensive rebounds
Def	Defensive rebounds	A	Assists	TO	Turnovers
Blk	Blocks	Stl	Steals	High	Team high

== Awards and milestones ==
=== Season highs ===
==== Players ====
- Points: A. Tubelis, 32 (Utah)
- Rebounds: C. Koloko, 13 (Arizona State, California & Wright State)
- Assists: K. Kriisa, 10 (Colorado & Utah)
- Steals: B. Mathurin & D. Terry, 5 (Northern Colorado, TCU & Wyoming)
- Blocks: O. Ballo, 6 (UCLA)
- Minutes: D. Terry, 42 (TCU)

==== Team ====
- Points: 105 (Sacramento State)
- Field goals: 39 (Northern Colorado)
- Field goal attempts: 75 (UCLA)
- 3 point field goals made: 13 (North Dakota State)
- 3 point field goal attempts: 32 (Oregon State)
- Free throws made: 29 (Wichita State)
- Free throw attempts: 42 (Wichita State)
- Rebounds: 54 (Texas–Rio Grande Valley)
- Assists: 31 (Sacramento State)
- Steals: 13 (Oregon State)
- Blocked shots: 12 (Cal Baptist)
- Turnovers: 22 (Wichita State)
- Fouls: 28 (Tennessee)

=== Weekly awards ===
Bennedict Mathurin

- Pac-12 Men's Basketball Player of the Week 4 (Dec. 6)
- Pac-12 Men's Basketball Player of the Week 5 (Dec. 13)
- Pac-12 Men's Basketball Player of the Week 15 (Feb. 21)
- NCAA March Madness Player of the Week 5 (Dec. 13)
- Oscar Robertson National Player of the Week (Dec. 13)

Christian Koloko

- Pac-12 Men's Basketball Player of the Week 2 (Nov. 22)

Ąžuolas Tubelis

- Pac-12 Men's Basketball Player of the Week 13 (Feb. 7)

=== Midseason awards watchlists ===
Bennedict Mathurin

- John R. Wooden Award Top 10 Watch List

Christian Koloko

- Naismith Defensive Player of the Year Award Watch List

Ąžuolas Tubelis

- Karl Malone Award Top 10 Watch List

=== Final awards watchlists ===
Tommy Lloyd

- Naismith Coach of the Year Late season top 15

Christian Koloko

- Naismith Defensive Player of the Year Award semifinalists

Bennedict Mathurin

- John R. Wooden Award Late Season Top 20 Watch List
- Jerry West Award Top 5 Finalist
- Naismith Player of the Year Midseason top 30

=== Postseason awards and Pac-12 honors ===
Bennedict Mathurin

- Pac-12 Player of the Year
- All―Pac-12 First Team
- Pac-12 Tournament Most Outstanding Player
- Pac-12 All-Tournament Team
- NABC District 19 First Team

Christian Koloko

- Pac-12 Defensive Player of the Year
- Pac-12 Most Improved Player of the Year
- All―Pac-12 First Team
- All―Pac-12 Defensive First Team
- Pac-12 All-Tournament Team
- NABC District 19 Second Team

Pelle Larsson

- Pac-12 6th Man of The Year

Dalen Terry

- All―Pac-12 Honorable Mention
- All―Pac-12 Defensive First Team

Ąžuolas Tubelis

- All―Pac-12 First Team
- NABC District 19 First Team

Tommy Lloyd

- Pac-12 Coach of the Year
- NABC District 19 Coach of the Year

=== National awards ===
Bennedict Mathurin

- 2022 Associated Press 2nd team All-American
- 2022 National Association of Basketball Coaches 2nd team All-American
- 2022 Sporting News 2nd team All-American
- 2022 United States Basketball Writers Association 2nd team All-American

Tommy Lloyd

- 2022 AP Coach of the Year
- 2022 NABC Coach of the Year
- 2022 USBWA Coach of the Year

== See also ==
- 2021–22 Arizona Wildcats women's basketball team
