= Catalina Foothills Unified School District =

School district in Tucson, Arizona

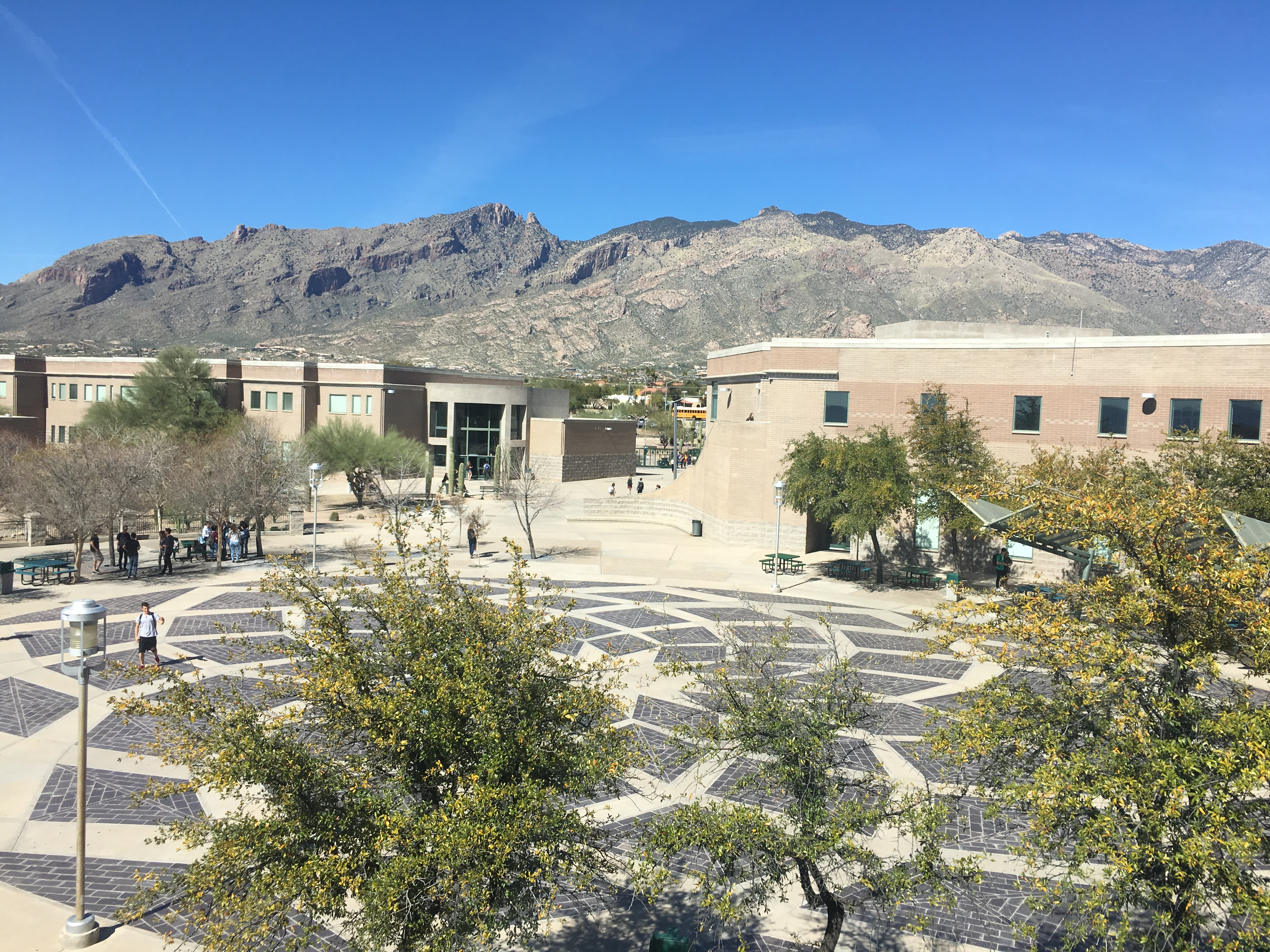
The student plaza at Catalina Foothills High School was inspired by Michelangelo's Piazza del Campidoglio.

The Catalina Foothills Unified School District #16 (often referred to as the Catalina Foothills School District, CFSD or District 16) is the PreK-12 school district for the Catalina Foothills area of Tucson, Arizona. Established in 1931, it has eight schools: one high school (9-12), two middle schools (6-8), four elementary schools (K-5) and one early learning center (PreK). The district educates over 5000 students who live throughout the greater Tucson metro area. Denise Bartlett, Ed.D., has served as superintendent since 2024.

In 2014, CFSD released its strategic plan, outlining its ongoing commitment to prepare students well for a 21st-century life that is increasingly complex and global. In the plan, the district outlines how it creates a learning environment in which each student achieves academic and personal excellence.

According to the Arizona Auditor General's report for fiscal year 2016, CFSD has a district-wide attendance rate of 95% and a high school graduation rate of 94% (2017). Ninety-four percent of all Catalina Foothills High School graduates go on to college. There are, on average, 18 students per teacher and CFSD teacher experience averages 11.3 years, higher than the state average. The district scores highly in fiscal responsibility with 60.5 cents of every dollar spent on instruction or instructional support. The students per teacher ratio is 17.8 and the average number of years of teacher experience is 11.3.

== Testing and test scores ==
The Arizona Department of Education (ADE) designated the Catalina Foothills School District (CFSD) as a top performing "A" school district for the sixth straight year in 2016. Prior to that, the district was ranked as an "Excelling" district for eight consecutive years.

The ADE ranked CFSD as #1 for the AP Excellence Index (percent of all 9th-12th grade students who earned a 3 or higher on any AP exam) based on data from the College Board, 2010.

Of all school districts statewide, CFSD had the highest AzMERIT scores in both English Language Arts and Math.

== Awards and recognition ==
Catalina Foothills School District is a nationally recognized Exemplar District, selected by P21.

In 2017 and 2018, CFSD was named No. 1 Public School District in Arizona, scoring an A+ in Academics, an A in Educational Outcomes, and an A− in Teachers, according to the 2017 and 2018 Niche rankings.

Orange Grove Middle School and Esperero Canyon Middle School were named among the top in Arizona by Niche.

Ventana Vista, Canyon View, Manzanita and Sunrise Drive were named among the Top Elementary Schools in Arizona.

Valley View Early Learning Center won Governor's Award in the Personal Learning Spaces Category.

Manzanita Elementary School was honored as a 2012 National Blue Ribbon School by the U.S. Department of Education.

From 2015 to 2017, Catalina Foothills High School was identified as Arizona's #1 non-selective high school by U.S. News & World Report.

Catalina Foothills High School was named the #2 non-selective district public high school in Arizona by The Washington Post.

From 2013 to 2016, Catalina Foothills High School was recognized as a top U.S. high school in Newsweek. Sunrise Elementary School was honored as a 2012 National Blue Ribbon School by the U.S. Department of Education.

Sunrise Drive Elementary School was honored as a 2024 National Blue Ribbon School by the U.S. Department of Education.

=== State championships ===
Boys Golf, Girls Softball, Chess (also National Champions), FIRST LEGO League (also won Mentor and Research Awards at Worlds and second place at North American Open), Speech and Debate, Science Olympiad, Girls Swim & Dive, Boys Swim & Dive, Cross Country, Girls Tennis, Boys Tennis, Girls Track, Marching Band (multiple awards) and Math (American Mathematics and Mathleague.org), Football (runners-up.)

==== Other student academic awards ====
National Merit Scholars, AP Scholars, Pima County Spelling Bee Champion, CIAU Chinese Immersion student trophies, Young Author's Competition, Southern AZ Thespian Festival, Model UN, Southern Arizona Research Science & Engineering Foundation (SARSEF), State History Day, Future Farmers of America (FFA), FIRST Tech Challenge Robotics and VEX Robotics.

== Schools ==
=== Early Learning Center ===
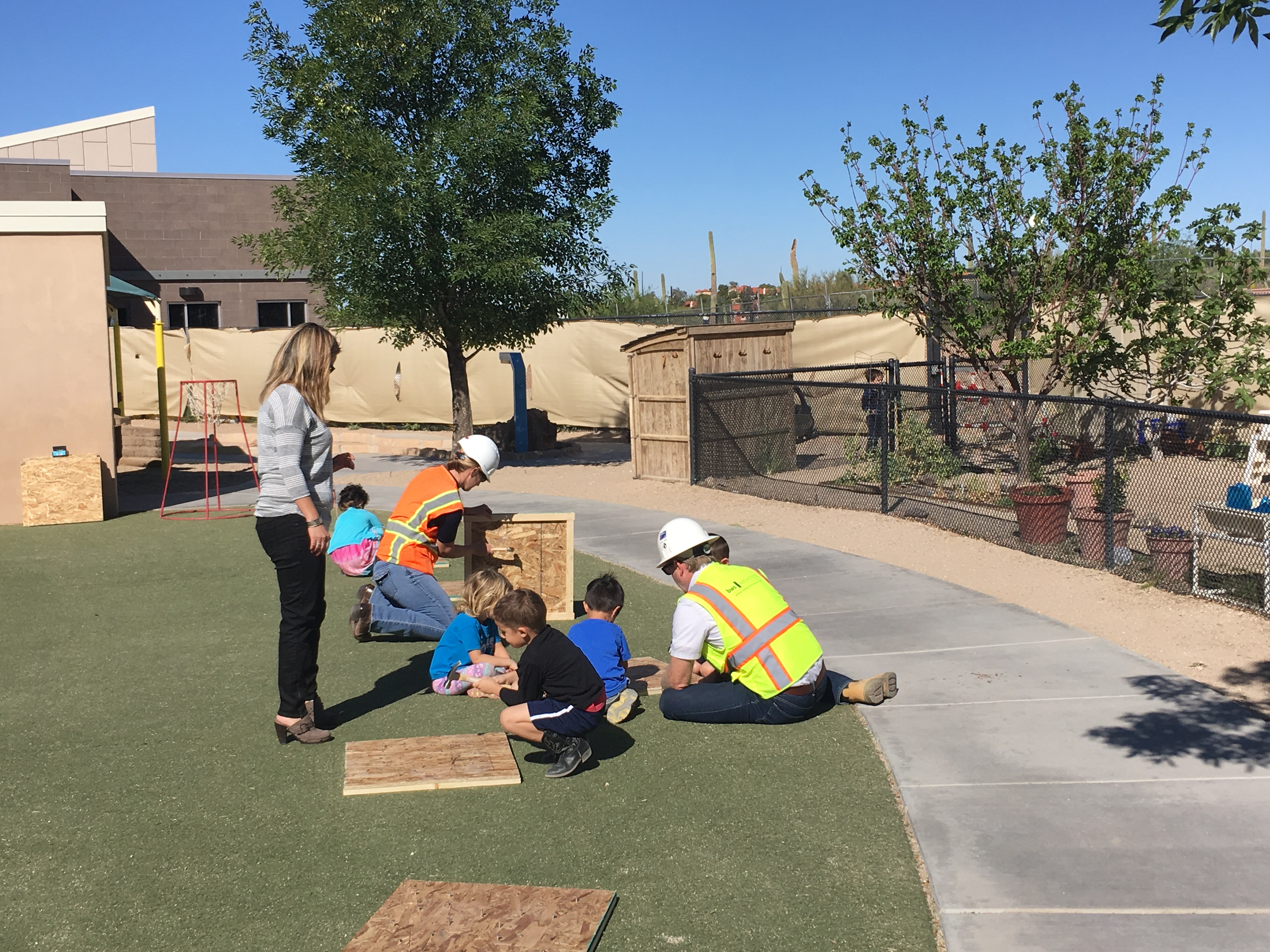
During the 2015-16 expansion of Valley View, students participated in several "construction day activities" led by professional contractors.

Valley View Early Learning Center

All Valley View Early Learning Center teachers are certified teachers, which is unique for a preschool. The school fosters an inquiry-based approach to learning, with developmental areas include dramatic play, sensory activities, art, literacy, science, math, socio-emotional activities, and systems thinking. VVELC offers a PreK Spanish and Mandarin immersion program. Beginning in 2016–2017, VVELC will add one Chinese Immersion classroom. There is a summer program for children ages 2 1/2 - 5.

=== Elementary schools ===
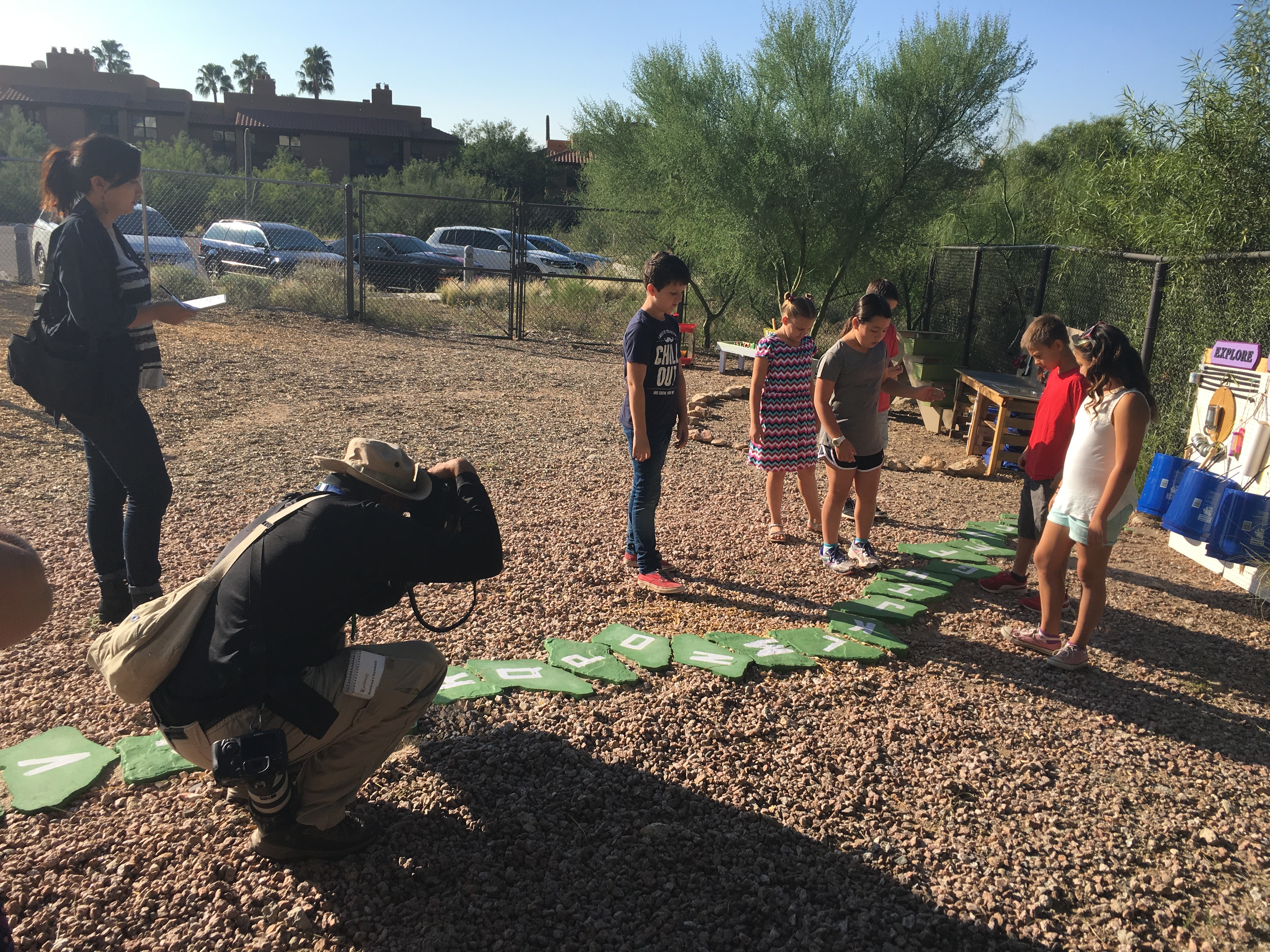
At Manzanita Elementary School, fifth grade students designed a playground for kindergarteners.

All CFSD elementary schools offer music, visual arts, Spanish (K-5), and physical education taught by highly qualified, certified teachers. Every classroom is a technology-enhanced classroom, with access to laptops (2:1 ratio), iPads, iPods, digital cameras, student response systems, Gmail, and Google academic accounts. Each school has specialists in gifted education, counseling and special education. Extended math and reading services are available for all grades. From grades 2–5, all students participate in robotics classes as part of their educational program. There is a before and after school CARE program at each campus, along with dozens of extracurricular offerings through CFSD Community Schools.

- Canyon View Elementary
- Manzanita Elementary
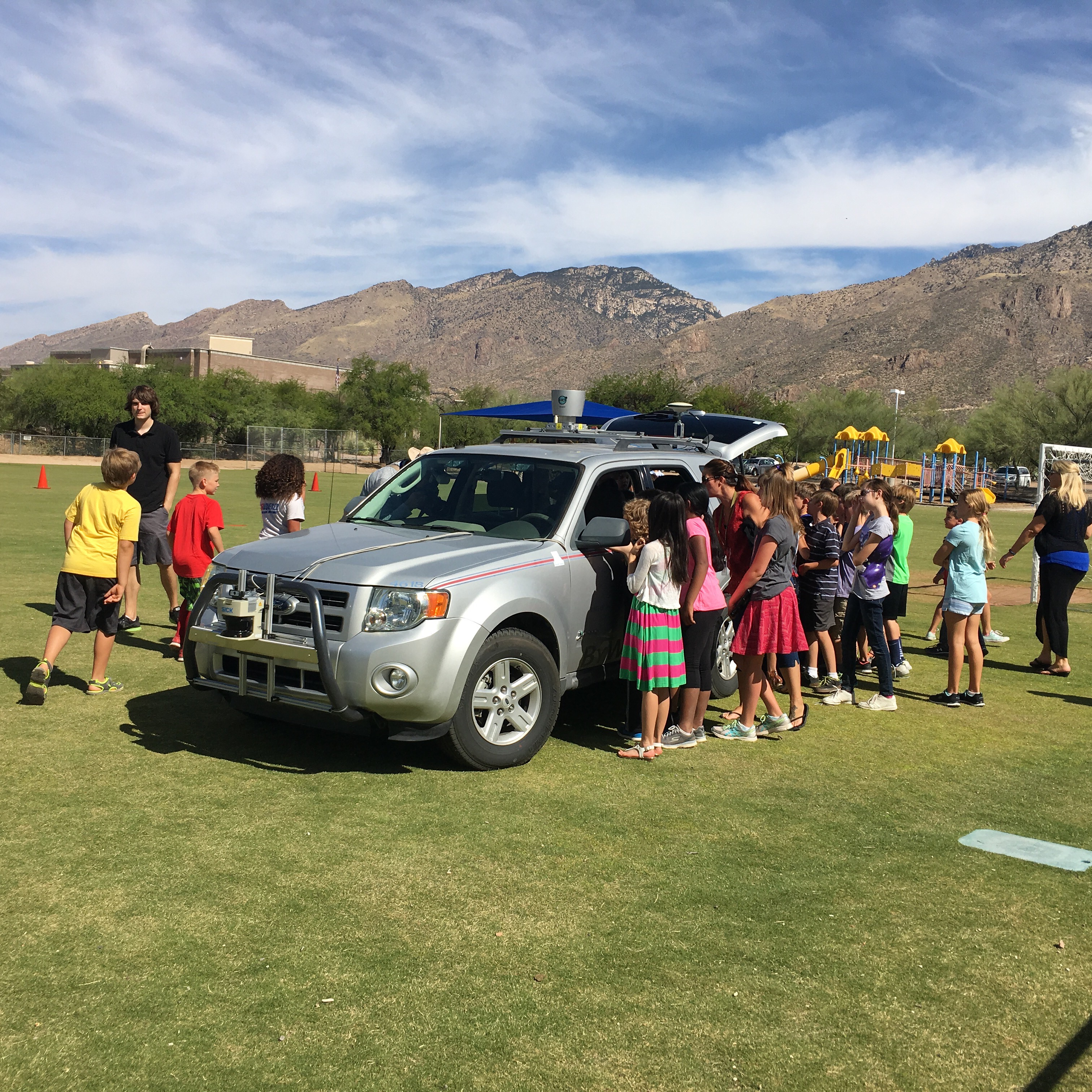
- With a team from the University of Arizona, students learned how to program an autonomous car.

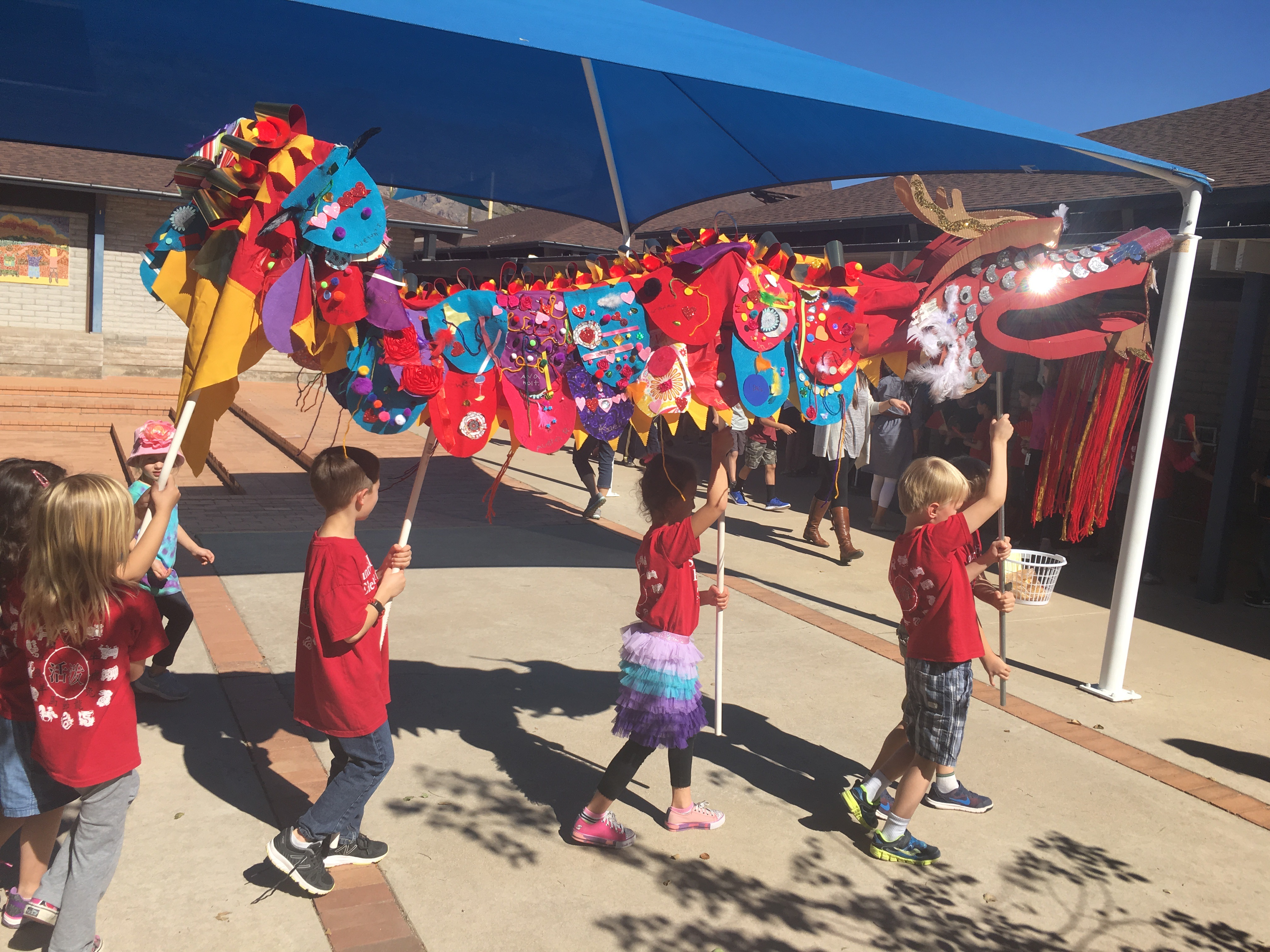
Sunrise Drive students celebrating the Spring Festival with a parade of dragons they created in class.

- Sunrise Drive Elementary (The CFSD Chinese Immersion program is located at this campus.)
- Ventana Vista Elementary (The CFSD Spanish Immersion program is located at this campus.)

=== Middle schools ===
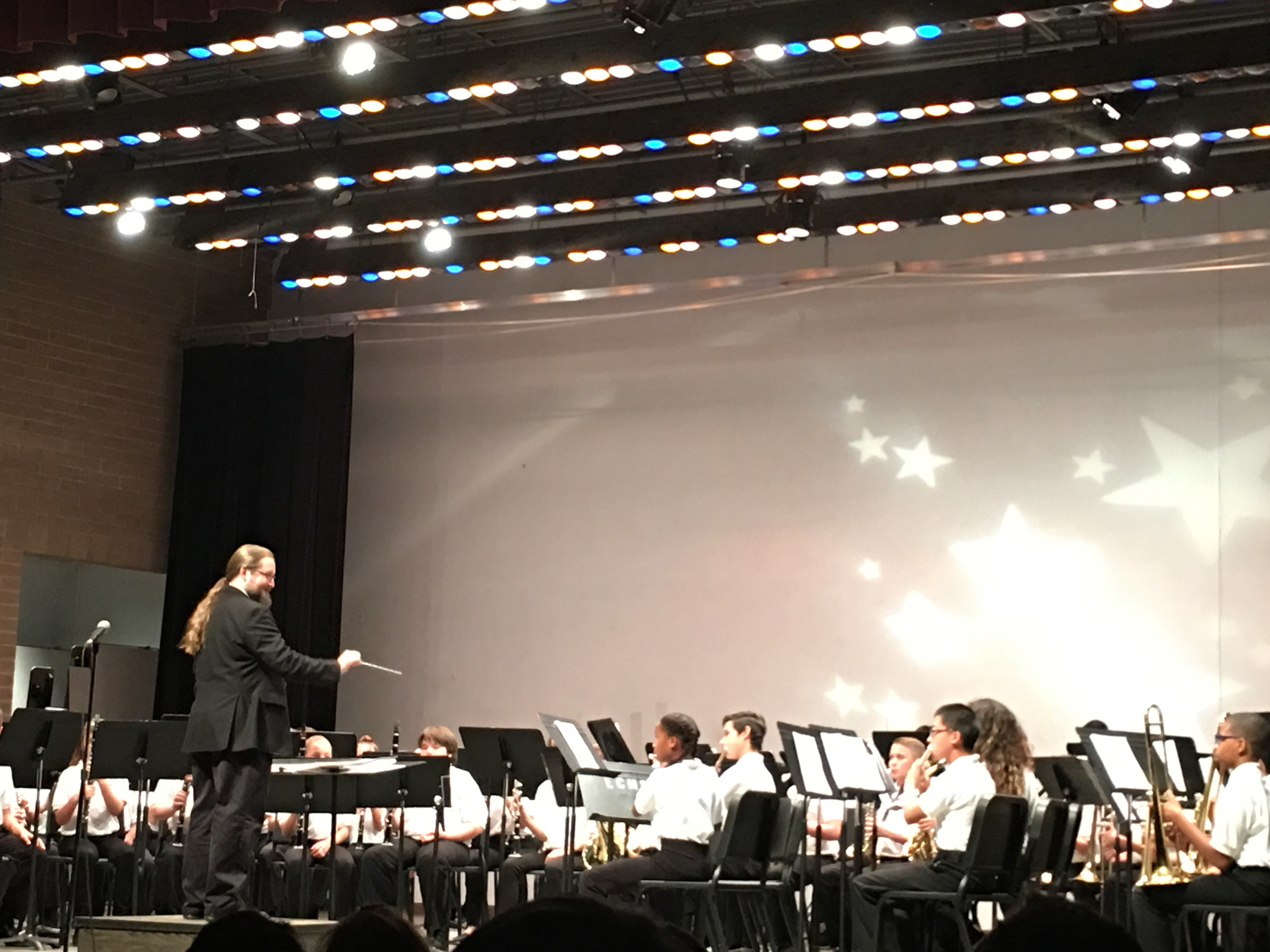
Esperero Canyon Middle School has a vibrant visual and performing arts program.

The CFSD middle school curriculum includes English Language Arts, Math, Social Studies, Science, Health & PE, World Languages learning (Spanish), performing arts, and visual arts. Each school has specialists in gifted education, counseling and special education. Every classroom is a technology-enhanced classroom, with access to laptops (2:1 ratio), iPads, iPods, digital cameras, student response systems, Gmail, and Google academic accounts. Math classes are offered at grade level and above grade level to serve differentiated student needs.

- Esperero Canyon Middle School
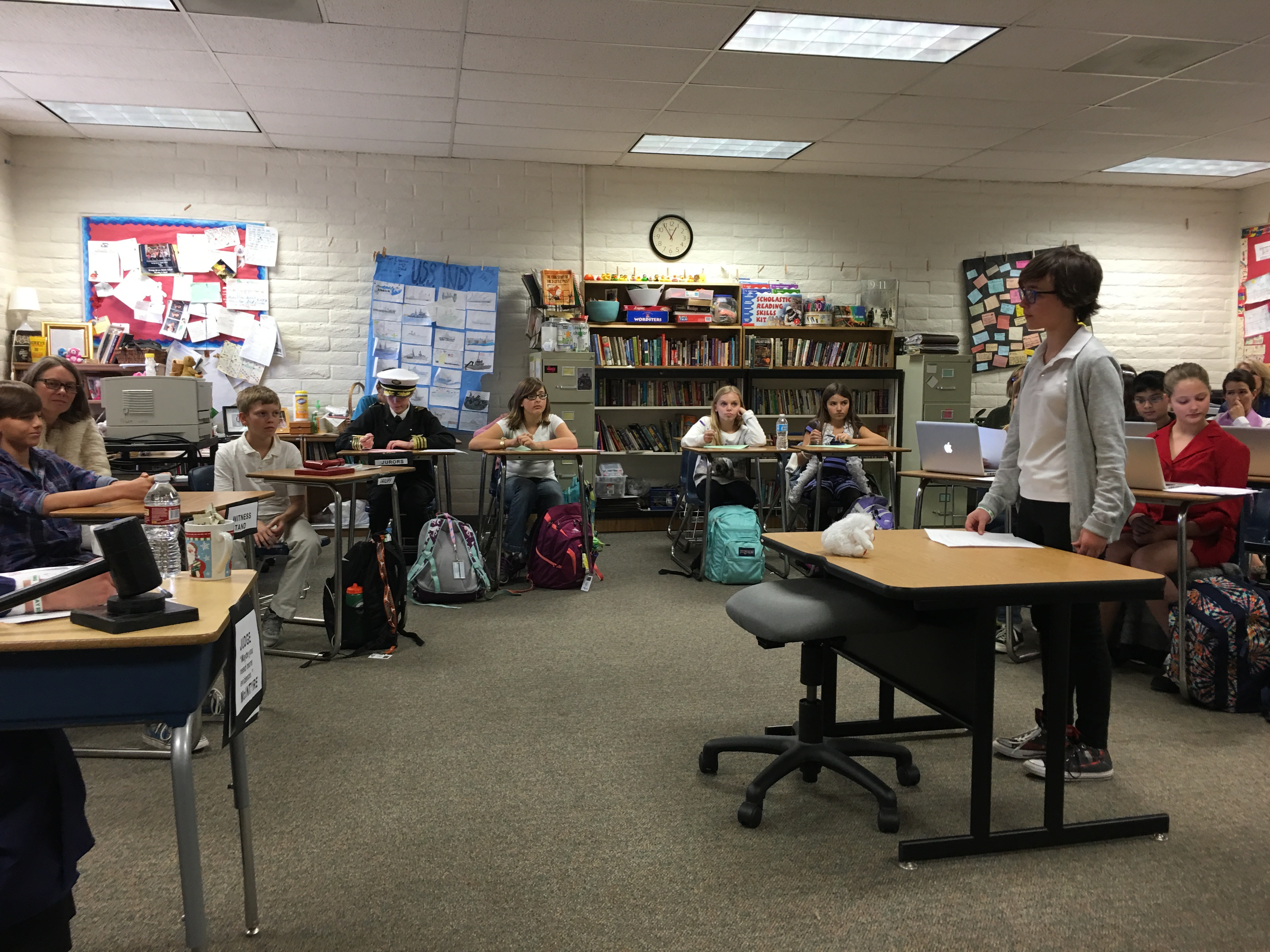
- At Orange Grove Middle School, social studies students participate in a mock trial.
- Orange Grove Middle School

=== High school ===
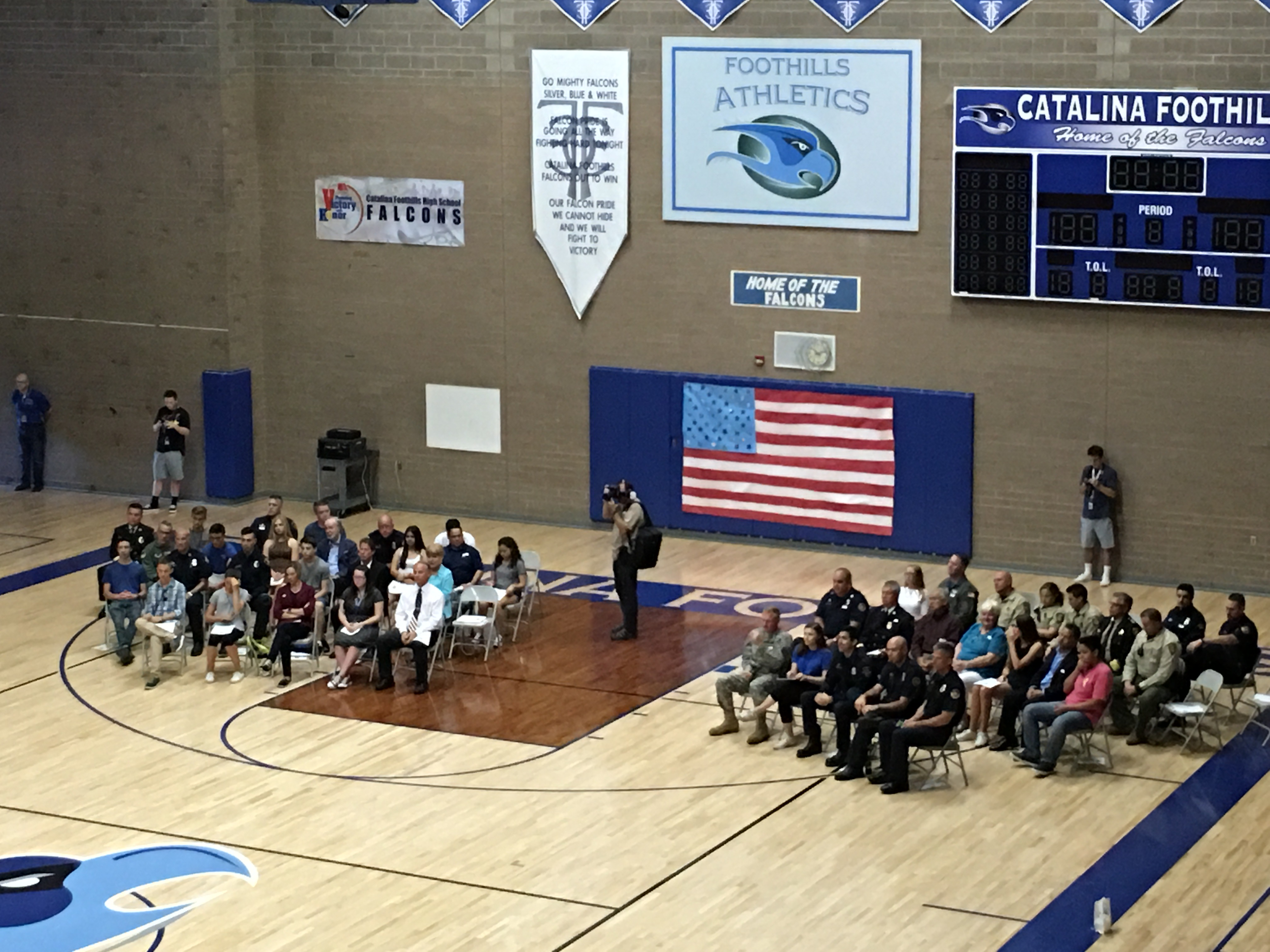
Every year Catalina Foothills High School students hold a 9/11 remembrance ceremony.

At Catalina Foothills High School (also known as Foothills and "CatFoot"), students are encouraged to take the highest-level courses that are appropriate for them. The high school offers 18 AP courses and an extensive array of honors classes. Career and Technical Education is composed of eight program areas: Agri-science, Audio Visual Technology, Bioscience, Engineering, Entrepreneurship Business and Marketing, Graphic Communications, Journalism and Technical Theatre-Theater Productions. Language offerings include Spanish and Chinese. Through a four-year program in engineering, Project Lead the Way, students can earn college credit at the University of Arizona. With about 250 members, the school boasts the largest high school marching band in Arizona.

== History ==
The Catalina Foothills School District opened its doors in 1931 with nine students and a teacher, who met in a garage. In 1939, developer John Murphey sold 2.2 acres on River Road to CFSD for the sum of ten dollars, with the stipulation that the land be used for a public school. That summer, a two-room country schoolhouse was designed by Joseph T. Joesler and built by the Works Progress Administration. Originally known as the River Road School, the building is now the Murphey Administration Center.

In 1993, the district went before the U.S. Supreme Court to argue that it did not have to provide an American Sign Language interpreter to a deaf student who transferred to a private, parochial school Salpointe Catholic High School. The district argued that, while the Individuals with Disabilities Education Act would normally require such services if the student attended public school, providing it for religious instruction would be unconstitutional. In Zobrest v. Catalina Foothills School District, the court found "that the Establishment Clause does not bar the school district from providing the requested interpreter." but also did not rule that the district is required to provide an interpreter.

== Notable alumni ==
- Matt Brase '01, head coach of NBA G-League team, the Rio Grande Valley Vipers
- Savannah Guthrie, co-anchor of Today on NBC. She attended Manzanita Elementary School and Orange Grove Middle School.
- Chris McCaleb '96, Emmy-nominated editor whose credits include AMC television shows Fear, The Walking Dead, Better Call Saul, Breaking Bad, and Halt and Catch Fire
- Joe Pagac '99, locally recognized muralist, winner of Tucson Weekly’s "Best Mural" award multiple years in a row
- Andrew Sherwood '99, Representative Arizona House of Representatives for District 26.
- Tom Udall United States Senator (New Mexico)
- Max Weisel '10, founder of RelativeWave, software engineer and digital artist
- Parker Young '06, an actor best known for his role as Ryan Shay on the ABC comedy Suburgatory

== District boundaries ==
The boundaries of CFSD are: East side of First Avenue from Ina Road south to 5600 block (westward extension of Sunrise Drive); 5600 block east to a northern extension of Campbell Avenue from the intersection of Campbell Avenue and River Road; south to River Road; River Road (1900 block) east to the east edge of John W. Murphey Administration Center (2101 East River); north to 4800 block (westward extension of Snyder Road); east to 8700 block (northern extension of Camino Seco); north to Coronado National Forest; west along the south boundary of the forest; north along the west boundary of the forest to Ina Road extended east.
