= Zobrest v. Catalina Foothills School District =

- Supreme Court of the United States

Argued February 24, 1993 Decided June 18, 1993
- Full case name: Zobrest et al. v. Catalina Foothills School District
- Docket no.: 92-94
- Citations: 509 U.S. 1 (more) 113 S. Ct. 2462; 125 L. Ed. 2d 1

Case history
- Prior: 963 F.2d 1190 (9th Cir. 1989)

Holding
- A school must continue to provide an interpreter under the Individuals with Disabilities Education Act even if the child elects to attend a religious school; to do so does not violate the Establishment Clause.

Court membership
- Chief Justice William Rehnquist Associate Justices Byron White · Harry Blackmun; John P. Stevens · Sandra Day O'Connor; Antonin Scalia · Anthony Kennedy; David Souter · Clarence Thomas

Case opinions
- Majority: Rehnquist, joined by White, Scalia, Kennedy, Thomas
- Dissent: Blackmun, joined by Souter (in full); Stevens, O'Connor (Part I)
- Dissent: O'Connor, joined by Stevens

Laws applied
- Establishment Clause; Individuals with Disabilities Education Act

Zobrest v. Catalina Foothills School District, 509 U.S. 1 (1993), was a United States Supreme Court case in which the court held that a school must continue to provide an interpreter under the Individuals with Disabilities Education Act even if the child elects to attend a religious school; to do so does not violate the Establishment Clause.

== Background ==
A deaf child and his parents sued the Catalina Foothills Unified School District in Arizona because the district refused to provide a sign language interpreter for the child after he transferred from a public school to Salpointe Catholic High School, a parochial school. Plaintiffs challenged the refusal to provide an interpreter on a variety of constitutional and statutory grounds, including the federal Individuals with Disabilities Education Act ("IDEA"), its Arizona counterpart, an IDEA regulation, the Arizona Constitution, and the Establishment and Free Exercise Clauses of the First Amendment to the United States Constitution.

A federal district court held, and the Court of Appeals affirmed, that as the interpreter "would act as a conduit for the child's religious inculcation", providing one at government expense would violate the Establishment Clause.

== Opinion of the court ==
In a 5–4 decision, the Supreme Court reached the same issue, but reversed on the merits, finding that if it provided an interpreter the school district would not violate the Establishment Clause. The Court held only that the Establishment Clause does not bar the school district from furnishing an interpreter in a parochial school. Lower federal courts will now have to determine whether the Zobrests are entitled to reimbursement for the interpreter's expenses.

In arguing its case before the lower courts, the school district raised other defenses in addition to the Establishment Clause bar. The district argued that the provision of an interpreter violated the Arizona Constitution, was not required by federal statute (IDEA) or regulation, and was, in fact, precluded under a federal funding regulation promulgated under the IDEA. The Court declined to address these "unrelated" issues because the parties pressed only the federal constitutional issue at both the appellate level and the summary judgment stage of the district court proceedings. The majority opinion, written by Chief Justice Rehnquist, recognized the validity of the "prudential rule of avoiding constitutional questions"; however, it acknowledged that the Court, on appeal, is presented with the "entire case," including "'nonconstitutional questions actually decided by the lower court as well as nonconstitutional grounds presented to, but not passed on, by the lower court.'"

In the Zobrest litigation, however, the Court found it significant that only the First Amendment questions—rather than nonconstitutional grounds—were "pressed" before the Ninth Circuit and that, even before the district court, "the parties chose to litigate the case on the federal constitutional issues alone." The Court concluded: "Given this posture of the case, we think the prudential rule of avoiding constitutional questions has no application. The fact that there may be buried in the record a nonconstitutional ground for decision is not by itself enough to invoke this rule." The Court then proceeded directly to the First Amendment issue, without considering any other grounds for the decision.

== Dissent ==
The four dissenters—Justices Blackmun, O'Connor, Souter and Stevens—accused the Zobrest majority of "unnecessarily address[ing] an important constitutional issue, [and] disregarding longstanding principles of constitutional adjudication." The dissent argued that resolution of the constitutional issue was not necessary because the Court could have remanded the case for consideration of alternative grounds of resolution. The lower courts then could have construed the IDEA so as not to require an interpreter for a parochial student so long as the school district provided an interpreter in a public school which the child could attend. The majority, however, merely held that governmental provision of an interpreter did not establish religion and that the Establishment Clause did not bar provision of an interpreter. In further proceedings, the lower courts may determine—despite the Supreme Court's Establishment Clause ruling—that the IDEA does not require provision of an interpreter in a parochial school when one is available in a public school in the district.

The parties deliberately did not brief or argue the "weighty" nonconstitutional issues because, according to the dissent, they wanted a ruling on the Establishment Clause question. The dissenters would have heeded the avoidance doctrine by vacating and remanding the case for consideration of the nonconstitutional questions, despite the parties' failure to brief these issues: "The obligation to avoid unnecessary adjudication of constitutional questions does not depend upon the parties' litigation strategy, but rather is a 'self-imposed limitation on the exercise of this Court's jurisdiction [that] has an importance to the institution that transcends the significance of particular controversies.'" The dissent asserted that the avoidance doctrine is the most "deeply rooted" doctrine of constitutional adjudication. The doctrine amounts to a "fundamental rule of judicial restraint," which has received the sanction of time and experience. The dissent imbued the avoidance doctrine with constitutional weight by relying on earlier Supreme Court precedent relating the avoidance doctrine to the case or controversy requirement. The dissenters also likened it to the "policy against entertaining political questions." Despite those constitutional linkages, however, the avoidance doctrine is most commonly classified as a prudential rule of judicial self-restraint.

== See also ==
- List of United States Supreme Court cases, volume 509
- List of United States Supreme Court cases
- Lists of United States Supreme Court cases by volume
- List of United States Supreme Court cases by the Rehnquist Court
