= Samantha Monahan =

American professional soccer player (born 1988)

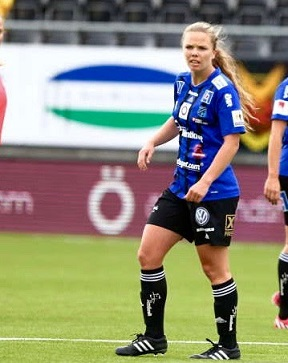
- Samantha Monahan with Östersunds DFF in 2016

Personal information
- Full name: Samantha Renee Monahan
- Date of birth: December 5, 1988 (age 37)
- Place of birth: Dumont, New Jersey
- Height: 5 ft 4 in (1.63 m)
- Positions: Midfielder; forward

Youth career
- 2003–2007: Tucson Soccer Academy

College career
Years	Team	Apps	(Gls)
2008–2011	Northern Arizona Lumberjacks	70	(13)

Senior career*
Years	Team	Apps	(Gls)
2008	Arizona Rush		
2012	Ekenäs IF	17	(9)
2013–2014	FC Honka	42	(18)
2015	FC Tucson Women		
2015–2016	Östersunds DFF	30	(12)
2017	Ballerup-Skovlunde Fodbold	2	(0)
- * Club domestic league appearances and goals

Samantha Monahan (born December 5, 1988, in Dumont, New Jersey) is an American professional soccer player who plays for Ballerup-Skovlunde Fodbold of the Danish Elitedivisionen.

== Early life ==
Monahan grew up in Tucson, Arizona and attended Catalina Foothills High School, where she was a four-year starter and won three consecutive 4A state championships in 2005, 2006 and 2007.

== Northern Arizona University ==
In 2012, she graduated with a major in Electronic Media and Film at Northern Arizona University in Flagstaff, Arizona, where she played for the Northern Arizona Lumberjacks women's soccer program from 2008 to 2012. She made 70 appearances for the Lumberjacks, accumulating 13 goals and 21 assists - good for eighth and second all-time in program history, respectively - and is one of ten players in program history with multiple All-Big Sky first team selections. She led her team to its first ever NCAA tournament appearances by winning back-to-back Big Sky Conference tournament titles in 2008 and 2009, and was named first team All-Big Sky in 2010 and 2011.

== Club ==
Monahan had a tryout with the Philadelphia Independence of the WPS in December 2011. She was asked to join the team for the final tryouts before the league was suspended before the 2012 season. The beginning of her professional career started overseas with Finnish club Ekenäs IF in 2012, before moving to FC Honka in 2013. In two seasons with Honka she had 18 goals and 18 assists and won the Finnish Cup in 2014.

In the summer of 2015, Monahan joined up with her current team, Swedish Elitettan club Östersunds DFF. In 2016 Monahan lead her team with 11 goals and 8 assists.

She played for Women's Premier Soccer League clubs Arizona Rush in 2008 and FC Tucson Women in 2015.

== Playing Style ==
Monahan is a versatile attacking player who typically lines up as an attacking midfielder or second striker, but also has the ability to play as a striker or an outside forward in a 4-3-3 or 4-2-3-1 formation.
