= Salpointe Catholic High School =

Location
- 1545 East Copper Street; Tucson, Pima County, Arizona 85719; United States; 32°15′14″N 110°56′57″W

Information
- School type: Private, coeducational High school
- Motto: Prayer, Service and Community
- Religious affiliations: Catholic, Carmelite
- Patron saint: Jean-Baptiste Salpointe
- Established: 1950 (76 years ago)
- Status: Active
- Oversight: Carmelite Order
- School code: 030510
- CEEB code: 030510
- President: Jennifer Harris
- Principal: Ardemis Martin
- Faculty: 173 (as of 2020)
- Grades: 9–12
- Gender: Co-Ed
- Age: 14 to 18
- Enrollment: 1,284 (2024)
  - Grade 9: 339
  - Grade 10: 317
  - Grade 11: 320
  - Grade 12: 288
- Average class size: 300
- Colors: Maroon and gold
- Slogan: Prayer, Service, Community
- Fight song: The Lancer Fight Song
- Sports: Arizona Interscholastic Association
- Mascot: Lancer
- Nickname: Salpointe
- Team name: Lancers
- Rival: Catalina Foothills High School
- Accreditation: North Central Association of Colleges and Schools
- Newspaper: The Crusader
- Yearbook: Horizons
- School fees: $12,660
- Tuition: $12,660 (24-25 school year)
- Website: www.salpointe.org

Salpointe Catholic High School is a college prep Catholic high school in Tucson, Arizona. Although located in the Diocese of Tucson, it is administered by the Carmelite Order.

== History ==
Salpointe Catholic High School is named for Arizona's first Bishop, Jean-Baptiste Salpointe, who worked as a missionary in the Arizona Territory from 1866 to 1885.

In the late 1940s, Tucson's parochial grammar schools had nine grades. The desire to build a Catholic high school for these graduates prompted the diocese to purchase the 40-acre (160,000 m^{2}) Florence Addition. Salpointe Catholic High School began in 1950 as a modest school consisting of what is now the Farr Patio and cafeteria. On the first day of school, Salpointe opened to 100 students. At that time, Tucson High School and Amphitheater High School were the only other high schools in Tucson. Salpointe had nine classrooms, a library and administrative offices. The first principal was Rev. Victor Stoner. He was followed by Rev. Edward Carscallen and Rev. George Dyke.

In summer 1952, Msgr. Francis Green, pastor of Ss. Peter and Paul Parish, visited the Chancery Office in Chicago, where he met Rev. Romaeus O'Brien, O. Carm. He mentioned that Bishop Daniel Gercke of Tucson was thinking about asking a religious order to operate Salpointe. In spring 1953, Green made a formal request that the Carmelites come to Tucson. Rev. Joseph Bonaventure Gilmore, O. Carm., Provincial Counselor, and Rev. Kenneth Moore, O. Carm., Assistant Provincial, met with Green, Msgr. Don Hughes, president of the Salpointe School Board, and other pastors. Gilmore became the first Carmelite principal in summer 1953. In August, he wrote to Rev. Raphael Kieffer, O. Carm., Carmelite Provincial, asking that the two promised Carmelites arrive as soon as possible.

The day school opened, Fr. Frank Florian McCarthy, O. Carm., and Fr. Carl Pfister, O. Carm., arrived from Mt. Carmel High School in Chicago. The original faculty consisted of three Carmelites, six Sisters of St. Joseph, three Sisters of Charity of Seton Hill, two Sisters of Charity of the Blessed Virgin Mary, and one Benedictine. Two laymen and one laywoman were also on the staff. On September 8, 1955, Bishop Gercke transferred ownership of the forty acres and buildings, then known as Salpointe High School, to the Carmelites for "$10.00 and other valuable considerations".

Much of Salpointe's early development (1954–1966) was due to the generosity of Helena S. Corcoran (with the support of her husband), who donated $8–$10 million for expansion of the Salpointe campus. Under her sponsorship, the school grew from 400 to 1,000 pupils, and the physical infrastructure that forms much of today's campus was established.

In 1993, the Catalina Foothills Unified School District went before the U.S. Supreme Court to argue that it did not have to provide an American Sign Language interpreter to a deaf student attending Salpointe Catholic High School. The district argued that, while the Individuals with Disabilities Education Act would normally require such services if the student attended public school, providing it for religious instruction at Salpointe would be unconstitutional. In Zobrest v. Catalina Foothills School District, the court found "that the Establishment Clause does not bar the school district from providing the requested interpreter."

== Admissions ==
=== Policies and procedures ===
Admissions decisions are made on the basis of information provided on several application forms, recommendations, transcripts, and a personal interview.

The admissions process starts in the fall of each year, before a student intends to enroll at Salpointe. Several important admissions-related events are held at Salpointe including Open House and Step Up Day.

Transfer and mid-year applications are accepted for consideration throughout the year.

== Administrative structure ==
=== "President/principal" model ===
The administration of the school consists of nine members headed by the president. Answering to the president are the principal, director of operations, the director of athletics, the director of campus ministry, the assistant principal for faculty development and supervision, assistant principal for student services, the director of counseling and the director of advancement.

=== Board of members and board of directors ===
The board of members consists of the members of the Provincial Council of the Society of Mount Carmel of Illinois (the Most Pure Heart of Mary Province of the Carmelite Order). Members serve for a term of three years.

The purpose, philosophy, and mission of Salpointe Catholic are the responsibility of the Board of Members. They also select and terminate the president of the school and the slate of candidates for principal. Certain financial measures require the approval of the Board of Members as well as any changes to the Articles of Incorporation and changes in the bylaws.

The board of directors is a committee of up to 18 members serving as the policy-making body for the school. Membership consists of up to four representatives of the Carmelite community and at least 10 members of the community at large. As trustees for the Carmelite Order, this board oversees the administration of the school, makes policies affecting all areas of school operations, oversees its financial well-being, and plans extensively for the future.

== Academics ==
=== Overview ===
Salpointe offers a four-year program with seven classes per year for all students. Salpointe curriculum requirements for the class of 2022 included four credits in English, four credits in Mathematics, four credits in Theology, three credits in Science, three credits in Social Studies, two credits in the same World Language, half a credit in Exercise Science, one credit in Fine Arts, a half credit Technology, and four credits in electives. Twenty-six credits are required to graduate. The student/teacher ratio is 15:1. The North Central Association of Colleges and Schools named Salpointe the first college preparatory school in Southern Arizona in 1987 because of its cumulative college prep curriculum. Salpointe was the third school in the state to receive this classification following Brophy and Xavier High Schools in Phoenix. The school is also certified by the Western Catholic Educational Association.

=== College preparatory education ===
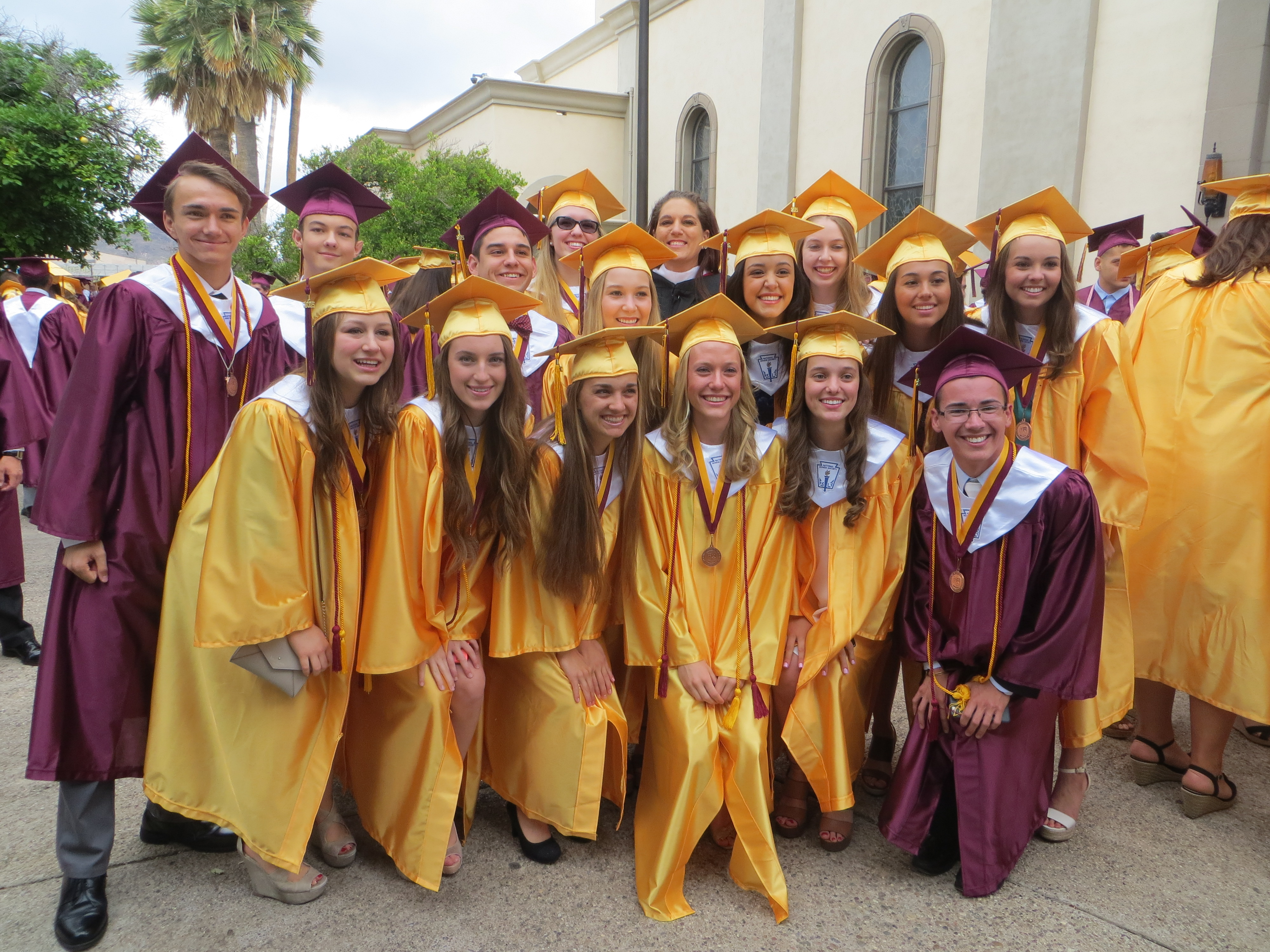
A selection of students from Salpointe's graduating class of 2015

All courses are college-preparatory. Humanities, Advanced Placement and honors courses are offered. Salpointe has a high school to college conversion rate of 95%. 245 students in the Class of 2015 were admitted to 175 colleges, universities and military academies. 80% matriculated to four-year institutions, 15% matriculated to two-year institutions and 5% selected military service or work. 56% of seniors participated in varsity athletics and all 24 athletic teams averaged a 3.5 GPA or higher.

=== Humanities program ===
The Humanities program is a challenging two-year program offered to highly motivated students, featuring Advanced Placement and Honors courses. Established in 1978, the program provides an integrated, interdisciplinary, multi-cultural approach needed by students to actively take part in their communities and a complex global universe. Students in the Humanities program are required to partake in the Humanities Project, a culmination of coursework across all classes. All final placements in Humanities require department approval. This program fulfills English, History, Theology and Fine Arts requirements for graduation.

=== STEM program ===
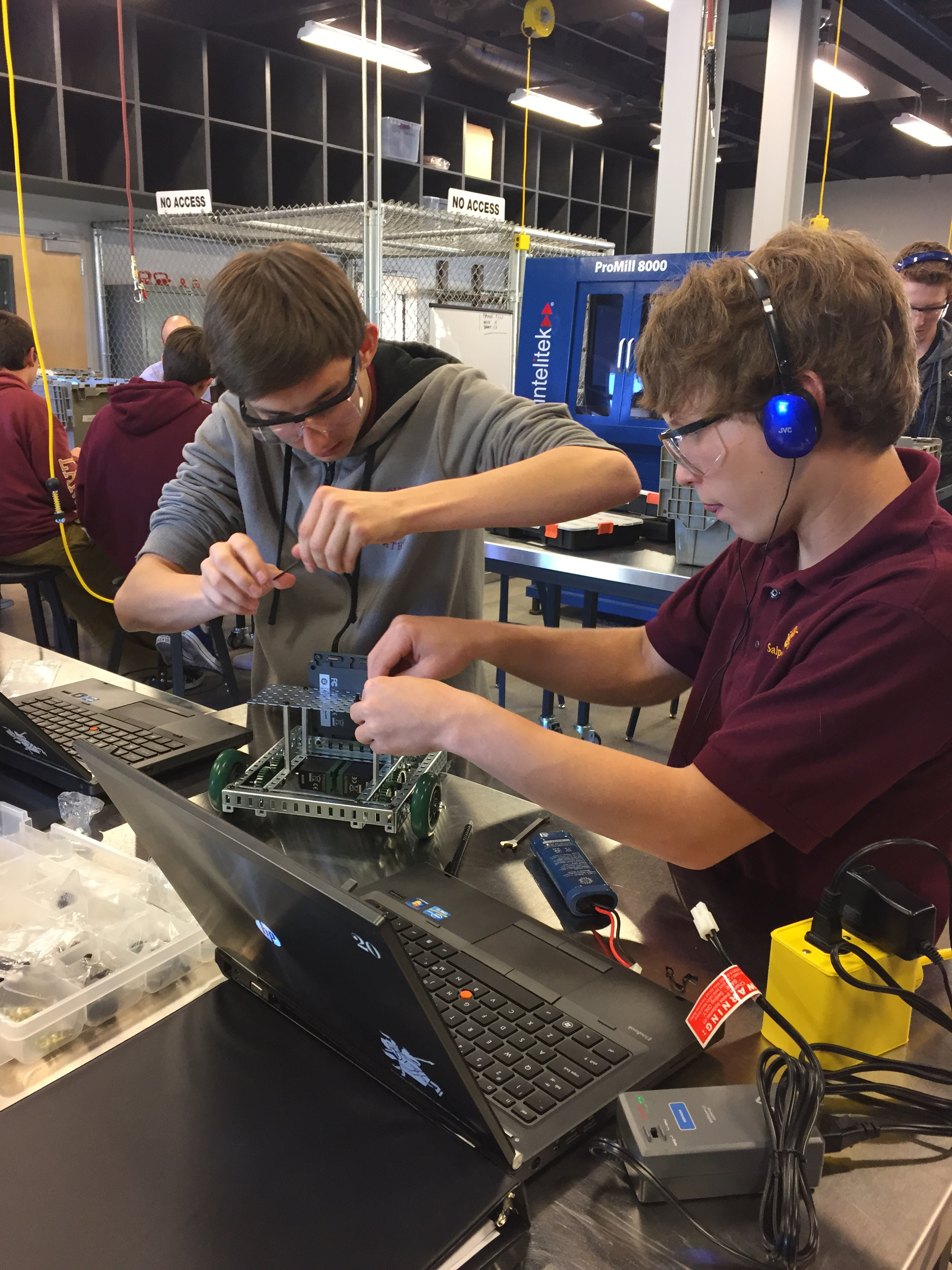
Salpointe's Robotics Class as part of their STEM Center

In 2015, Salpointe opened their Cracchiolo Family Science, Technology, Engineering, and Mathematics (STEM) Center. The 8,000 square-foot building was part of a $12 million capital campaign that also funded a new athletics complex and student center. The STEM center focuses on engineering, robotics and biotechnology and includes a 3D printer, a biomedical lab, classrooms and outdoor work spaces. Salpointe's STEM program is one of the first integrated STEM high school curricula in Southern Arizona.

As of 2016, the courses offered in the STEM program include Engineering 102, Engineering Fundamentals, Intermediate Robotics, Mechanical Engineering and Design, Advanced Robotics, Biotechnology, and Environmental Engineering.

=== Drama and theater ===
In addition to widely notable athletics, Salpointe's drama department is recognized by the Arizona State Thespian Board, and has been invited to perform school productions on the "main stage" at the Arizona State Thespian festival. In 2012, Salpointe was the first-ever Southern Arizona school to receive state selection of a one-act performance to be performed at a national level.

In 2013, Salpointe's drama students, with their production Cash on Delivery, were invited to perform in front of thousands of their peers at the Arizona Thespian Festival, under the direction of Dana Milne, the school's Director of Fine Arts. In 2024, Salpointe was chosen to perform their rendition of the musical Hadestown: Teen Edition at the festival, under the direction of Ericka Quintero, the school's Theater & Theater Tech teacher.

In 2022, Salpointe student Chloe Harris competed in the 2022 Jimmy Awards for her role as Sister Mary in Salpointe's production of Disaster! The following year, Salpointe student Samia Posadas competed at the Jimmy Awards for her role as Elle Woods in the school's production of Legally Blonde: The Musical. She was then chosen as one of eight finalists out of 96 total nominees, and gave a solo performance of the song "Stupid With Love" from the musical Mean Girls. The following year Posadas competed again for her role as Cinderella in Salpointe's production of Into The Woods, and was selected as a finalist for the second year in a row. She gave a solo performance of the song "I'd Give My Life For You" from Miss Saigon.

Following that, in 2026, student Samia Posadas returned once again to the Jimmy Awards for her role as Alice Murphy in the musical Bright Star. She performed in the first character medley, and once again was chosen as one of eight finalists, this time out of 116 total nominees. She performed a solo performance of "Where Am I Now?" from the musical Lysistrata Jones, and was chosen to receive the Best Actress Award, becoming the first Tucson nominee to win the Jimmy Awards.

=== Band and orchestra ===
Salpointe also has a band and orchestra, which have, on multiple occasions, been featured on a local Tucson, Arizona-based news station, for their weekly "wake up call". In 2016, one of Salpointe's brass musicians, Alexander Melnychuck, was included as part of the GRAMMY Camp — Jazz Session and GRAMMY in the Schools Media Team.

The Instrumental Music program has undergone changes since 2019 with the coming of a new director, Jim Howell, Salpointe alumnus of 1991. The ensembles available to students include Jazz Band, a zero hour course dedicated to the history behind jazz as well as playing pieces from throughout the history of jazz, and learning fundamental jazz theorems. Drum Line, a class dedicated to the playing of marching-style drums that coincides with the Lancer Marching Band. In Drum Line, students learn drum rudiments, as well cadences in preparation for athletic events and assemblies. Concert Band, where students can learn music history and play exciting and challenging arrangements in the traditional concert-ensemble style. Orchestra, where students can play any of the traditional orchestral instruments and delve into the history behind each piece. Marching Band, an after school class period where students play their instruments to support the Salpointe sport teams, learn fundamentals of marching, and compete against other schools in Southern Arizona, all whilst excelling through and showcasing their musical talents. All performing music courses offered at Salpointe offer units in music theory, scale theory, and complex understandings of rhythm.

=== Aspire Capital Project ===
in 2019, Salpointe implemented the Aspire Capital Project, an 11-million-dollar fundraising campaign with focuses on academics, arts, and athletics.

The new Stearns Center for the Arts features the Ginny L. Clements Dance Studio, Czarina and Humberto S. Lopez Visual Arts Rooms, Pocono Music Room, Foundation Choir Room, Stevens Art Gallery, Carmelite Plaza, and the Helena S. Corcoran Theater.

The renovation of four multipurpose learning spaces and two digital educational classrooms also took place, including the Tim and Jane Garigan Room 411, Mike and Gracie Quiroz Marum Room 424 and Ashton Expansion of the STEM Patio.

The renovation of existing facilities meets the needs of 85% of Lancers who participate in extracurricular activities: Kalil Family Gymnasium including the Pat Sniezek Wall of Champions and Rev. Msgr. John Lyons Bistro, Stevens Strength and Conditioning Center, Michael Geddes Wrestling Facility, Alumni Hall, as well as installation of lights on the baseball, softball and track fields.

== Athletics ==
Over 85% of students participate in co-curricular activities each year. Salpointe sponsors 24 varsity athletic teams competing primarily at the Division II level. Lancers have accumulated the largest number of AIA Scholar-Athlete awards in Arizona and have won 259 region championships, 46 state runner-up and 27 state championships in various sports, including a football state championship in 2013. On-campus facilities include a gymnasium, weight room, wrestling room, football, soccer, rugby, track, baseball and softball fields. Tennis, cross-country and swimming utilize off campus facilities.

== Support services ==
=== Campus ministry ===
Under the guidance of the Carmelites, Salpointe has developed an active campus ministry. Students are encouraged to attend a number of retreats throughout their time at Salpointe, culminating in the Kairos retreat experience during their junior or senior year. Students at Salpointe also attend periodic all-school mass, under the direction of the school chaplain.

=== Counseling services ===
In addition to routine academic counseling and schedule management, the school counselors are actively engaged in helping students mature in their decision-making, values clarification, and interpersonal relationships. Salpointe's Counseling and Guidance Department has undertaken a number of novel initiatives in recent years such as the Community of Concern program. The Community of Concern committee sponsors annual forums to inform parents about medical, legal, criminal and social aspects of drug and alcohol abuse.

Salpointe has implemented an anonymous tip-line to report suspected drug use. The school has also established a mandatory drug testing program to screen every student at least one time during the school year for drug use.

== Notable alumni ==
- Kelly Cagle, head women's soccer coach at Virginia Tech
- Mark Carreon, former MLB player
- John Fina, former NFL offensive tackle
- Alex Flanagan, sports journalist
- Patricia Preciado Martin, writer
- Frank Garcia, former NFL punter
- Jesse Mermuys, basketball coach
- Tairia Mims, softball Olympic gold medalist
- Donovan Olumba, former NFL cornerback
- Kiley Reid, writer and novelist
- Bijan Robinson, running back for the Atlanta Falcons
- John Roll, chief judge for the United States District Court for the District of Arizona
- Andy Trouard, professional distance runner
- Ed Vosberg, former MLB player
- Mark Wystrach, lead singer for Midland
- Kristofer O'Dowd college center
- Lathan Ransom, Safety, Ohio State University

== See also ==
- List of high schools in Arizona
- List of private and independent schools in Arizona
