= Pava LaPere =

American businesswoman (1997–2023)

- Born: January 21, 1997; Tucson, Arizona, U.S.
- Died: September 22, 2023 (aged 26); Baltimore, Maryland, U.S.
- Cause of death: Murder (Strangulation and blunt force trauma)
- Education: Johns Hopkins University
- Occupation: Businesswoman
- Years active: 2018–2023

Pava Marie LaPere (January 21, 1997 – September 22, 2023) was an American businesswoman who was the founder and CEO of the tech startup EcoMap Technologies. She was murdered on September 22, 2023.

== Early life and career ==
LaPere grew up in Tucson. She graduated from Catalina Foothills High School in 2015, and from Johns Hopkins University in 2019. She initially studied computer science for three years before switching to sociology; she said that she wanted to use entrepreneurship to improve societal inequalities.

LaPere started Innov8MD, a non-profit for supporting student entrepreneurs in Maryland. In 2018, LaPere and Sherrod Davis founded EcoMap Technologies when LaPere was 21. The company sells artificial intelligence tools aimed at making clients' information more accessible and customer communications more seamless. In 2023, LaPere was included on Forbes's 30 Under 30 list in the social impact category.

== Murder ==
Per Baltimore Police, on September 22, 2023, LaPere allowed Jason Billingsley access to her apartment building; he was seen getting on an elevator with LaPere. Within an hour, Billingsley was filmed wiping his hands on his shorts and hastily leaving the building. On September 25, 2023, LaPere was found dead from strangulation and blunt force trauma on the rooftop of her apartment building. Following a days-long manhunt, Billingsley was arrested on September 27. He was charged with first-degree murder, assault, and using a brick as a dangerous weapon.

=== Perpetrator ===
Jason Billingsley (born 1990 or 1991) is a convicted sex offender. He pleaded guilty to first-degree assault in 2009 and second-degree assault in 2011.

In 2013, Billingsley was arrested and charged with rape following allegations that he had forced a woman to perform oral sex on him at knifepoint. In 2015, Billingsley pleaded guilty to a first-degree sex offense and was sentenced to 30 years in prison. Under a plea agreement, 16 years of his sentence were suspended. Billingsley was released from prison early in October 2022 under Maryland's diminution credit system, which allows inmates to reduce their sentences through things such as good behavior and taking educational courses.

Billingsley was a suspect in another similar case that occurred on September 19, three days prior to LaPere's murder, wherein he used his credentials as a maintenance worker to gain entry to another woman's apartment, raped her multiple times at gunpoint, and set her boyfriend and their apartment on fire with the aid of an accelerant. He was charged with rape, attempted murder, and arson. Police believe that LaPere may not have known Billingsley.

In August 2024, Billingsley pleaded guilty to first-degree murder in LaPere's death, as well as the rape, attempted murder, and arson from the previous case, and received three life sentences with the possibility of parole, two to be served consecutively. The consecutive sentences reduce the likelihood that Billingsley will be released from prison; Baltimore City State's Attorney Ivan Bates stated that Billingsley would likely be 93 years old before he would have an opportunity to be released, as he would have to serve 60 years of his sentence before becoming eligible for parole.

=== Reactions ===
On September 26, EcoMap Technologies issued a statement: "[T]he circumstances surrounding Pava's death are deeply distressing, and our deepest condolences are with her family, friends, and loved ones during this incredibly devastating time."

Following Billingsley's arrest, LaPere's family said, "We appreciate the tireless efforts of the Baltimore Police Department, and their law enforcement partners, throughout the course of this investigation and apprehension of the suspect. We're relieved to know he can no longer hurt other innocent victims. While this doesn't change that Baltimore lost one of its most passionate, influential fans, our efforts remain focused on remembering and celebrating Pava Marie – her life, successes, and legacy."

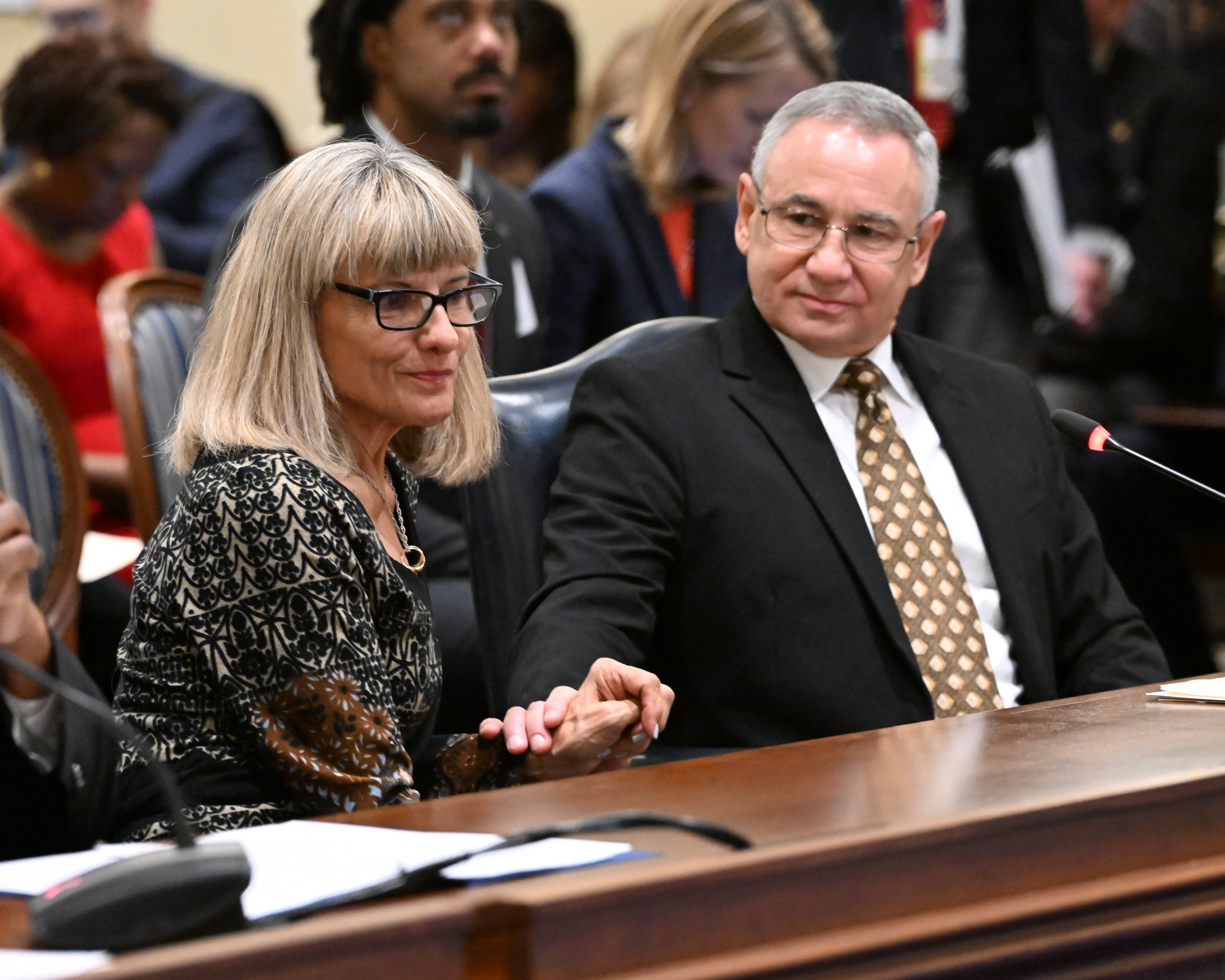
LaPere's parents testifying to legislators, 2024

Billingsley's mother expressed condolences for his victims and their families.

Memorial services for LaPere were held at Johns Hopkins University in December 2023, where university President Ronald J. Daniels announced that it would rededicate its Center for Entrepreneurship in LaPere's honor.

In January 2024, Maryland Governor Wes Moore endorsed legislation to restrict sex offenders' ability to earn "good time" credits that reduce their sentence, citing LaPere's murder. LaPere's parents testified in support of the bill. The bill passed and was signed into law by Governor Wes Moore in May 2024.
