= Patricia Preciado Martin =

Writer and oral historian (born 1939)

Patricia Preciado Martin (born July 6, 1939) is an author and researcher who specializes in oral history and the history of Arizona. She was one of the first to document, write and share stories of Mexican Americans in Tucson, Arizona.

== Biography ==
Preciado Martin was born in Prescott, Arizona in 1939. At the age of three, she and her family moved to Tucson. In 1960, Preciado Martin received her bachelor's degree in education from the University of Arizona.

In the early 1960s, she was a volunteer in the Peace Corps, where she served in British Honduras (now known as Belize). From 1979 to 1983, Preciado Martin was a member of the research team that collected photographs and oral histories directly from Tucson's Mexican American community; this project, the Mexican Heritage Project, was a collaboration worked with the Arizona Historical Society to save stories about the Tucson's Mexican American community.

== Work and writings ==
Preciado Martin is known for her work collecting oral histories from older Mexican-Americans. She has spoken about discrimination against Mexican-American women, and works to share stories of her heritage in order to keep it from becoming "homogenized". Preciado Martin has worked with photographers to combine oral histories with pictures of Arizona residents and Mexican American families. In her 1992 book, Songs My Mother Sang to Me: An Oral History of Mexican American Women, she shared interviews of Arizona-area Mexican-American women who present different pasts. In 2000, her book, Amor Eterno: Eleven Lessons in Love, shared the story of a woman who prayed for her son's return from war. Her 2016 book, El Milagro and Other Stories, was adapted into a shadow play presented in Tucson in 2016.

== Selected publications ==
- Martin, Patricia Preciado (1983). Images and Conversations Mexican Americans Recall a Southwestern Past. Tucson: University of Arizona Press. p. 111. ISBN 9780816508037.
  - Reviewed by the Journal of Arizona History.
- Martin, Patricia Preciado (1992). Songs My Mother Sang to Me An Oral History of Mexican American Women. Tucson: University of Arizona Press. p. 224. ISBN 9780816513291.
  - The book was reviewed by publications centered on women and American history.
- Martin, Patricia Preciado (2000). Amor Eterno Eleven Lessons in Love. Tucson: University of Arizona Press. p. 110. ISBN 9780816519941.
  - The book was reviewed by the popular press.
- Martin, Patricia Preciado (2004). Beloved Land An Oral History of Mexican Americans in Southern Arizona. Tucson: University of Arizona Press. p. 150. ISBN 9780816523825.
  - Reviewed by Southwestern Historical Quarterly and Agricultural History
- Martin, Patricia Preciado (2016). El Milagro and Other Stories. Tucson: University of Arizona Press. p. 108. ISBN 9780816515486.
  - Reviewed by the Journal of Arizona History

== Awards and honors ==
In 1997, Preciado Martin was named by the Arizona Library Association as Arizona Author of the Year in 1997. She received the Arizona Humanities Council Distinguished Public Scholar Award of Excellence in 2000. She has also received an award from the Mujer 2000 committee and the University of Arizona Hispanic Alumni Association. In 2001, she received the Southwest Book Award. In 2003, she delivered the Lawrence Clark Powell lecture, and in 2005 she received the Sharlot Hall award.
