= Matt Brase =

American basketball coach (born 1982)

Philadelphia 76ers
- Title: Assistant coach
- League: NBA

Personal information
- Born: June 15, 1982 (age 44)
- Listed height: 6 ft 6 in (1.98 m)
- Listed weight: 225 lb (102 kg)

Career information
- High school: Catalina Foothills (Catalina Foothills, Arizona)
- College: Central Arizona (2001–2003); Arizona (2003–2005)
- NBA draft: 2007: undrafted
- Position: Forward
- Coaching career: 2008–present

Career history

Coaching
- 2008–2009: Arizona (assistant)
- 2009–2011: Grand Canyon (assistant)
- 2012–2013: Rio Grande Valley Vipers (assistant)
- 2015–2018: Rio Grande Valley Vipers
- 2018–2020: Houston Rockets (assistant)
- 2022–2023: Pallacanestro Varese
- 2023–present: Philadelphia 76ers (assistant)

Career highlights
- NBA D-League champion (2013)

Matt Brase (born June 15, 1982) is an American professional basketball coach who is an assistant coach for the Philadelphia 76ers of the National Basketball Association (NBA) and the head coach of Haiti men's national basketball team.

== Playing career ==
Brase played for University of Arizona and led the team to the NCAA Division I men's basketball tournament, where they reached the Elite Eight in 2005. He was coached by his grandfather, basketball coach Lute Olson, from 2003 to 2005.

== College coaching career ==
After graduation, Brase served in different capacities in the Arizona Wildcats basketball department. After being promoted to assistant coach at Arizona during the 2009, his team reached the Sweet 16.

For the 2009–11 seasons, Brase served as an assistant coach at Grand Canyon University while studying for his master's degree in business administration with a focus on leadership.

== Professional coaching career ==
The Houston Rockets hired him in 2011. During the 2011–12 season he worked as part of the Rockets basketball operations staff focusing on player personnel and scouting college, international and NBA players. In 2012–2013 Brase served as an assistant coach for Rio Grande Valley Vipers. In 2013, he became the Director of Operations for the Houston Rockets. The Houston Rockets named him the head coach for the Rio Grande Valley Vipers beginning the 2015 season. In 2018, he became an Assistant coach for the Houston Rockets and led the team to an NBA D-League Western Conference title.

On July 6, 2022, he became the head coach of Pallacanestro Varese in the Italian Lega Basket Serie A (LBA).

On September 5, 2023, Brase became an assistant coach for the Philadelphia 76ers. It reunited him with former Vipers head coach Nick Nurse.

== Personal life ==
Brase's father, Jon, is a dentist. He played baseball at Iowa. Brase's sister played for University of Arizona's women's basketball team before becoming a coach at Loyola Marymount and then with the WNBA's Phoenix Mercury. His mother, Jody, is the daughter of Lute Olson, and the Principal at Catalina Foothills High School.
