= Catalina Foothills High School =

Location
- 4300 East Sunrise Drive; Catalina Foothills, Arizona 85718; United States; 32°18′29″N 110°53′56″W

Information
- Type: Public
- Founded: 1992 (34 years ago)
- School district: Catalina Foothills School District #16
- CEEB code: 030476
- Principal: Chris Lambert
- Teaching staff: 92.20 (FTE)
- Grades: 9-12
- Enrollment: 1,868 (2023-2024)
- Student to teacher ratio: 20.26
- Campus type: Suburban
- Colors: Royal blue and silver
- Mascot: Falcons
- Rival: Salpointe Catholic High School
- Website: cfhs.cfsd16.org

Catalina Foothills High School (Catalina Foothills, Foothills, or CFHS) is a public high school in the suburban community of Catalina Foothills, just north of Tucson, Arizona. It is the only high school in the Catalina Foothills School District. Founded in 1992, the school has approximately 1,650 students in grades nine through twelve. The school mascot is the peregrine falcon, and the school colors are blue and silver. Based on the percentage of students passing or exceeding Arizona's Instrument to Measure Standards standardized test, Catalina Foothills is one of the top high schools in the state. Annually, Catalina Foothills averages over 10 National Merit Finalists.

== School history ==
Prior to the establishment of Catalina Foothills, some district students attended high school in the Tucson Unified School District and the rest primarily in the Amphitheater district. The establishment of Catalina Foothills was postponed several decades due to the ability of district students to attend high school in neighboring school districts.

Construction began in 1991 on a 40-acre (160,000 m^{2}) site centrally located in the district. The Catalina Foothills School Board had acquired the site in the late 1970s. The school opened to the ninth grade in 1992 when classes met at a district middle school. In 1993 campus was opened to ninth and tenth graders, and the first graduating class of Foothills High walked in late spring 1996.

== Rankings ==
In 2006, Catalina Foothills had the state's second-highest percentage of students exceeding math, the third-highest percentage of students exceeding reading standards, and the ninth-highest percentage of student exceeding writing standards. Catalina Foothills has been ranked in the top 1.7% of high schools in the US.

In 2014, the U.S. News & World Report rankings of the top high schools ranked CFHS at number 754 out of 21,000 in the country (in the top 4 percent of all public high schools nationally), No. 10 in Arizona, and No. 3 in Tucson. In 2013, CFHS also ranked 245th amongst all high schools in science, technology, engineering, and mathematics fields, although lost its rank in 2014. US News awarded the school a silver medal in its rankings survey. Newsweek ranked CFHS 310 out of the top 500 public high schools in the US in its 2016 ranking. Newsweek's list placed CFHS 2nd in Tucson and 6th out of the 11 Arizona high schools.

== Activities ==
- The Chess Team won the High School National Championship in 2005, 2007, 2008, and 2014, as well as six other national championships. The Chess Team also won the AIA State High School Championship in 2005–09, and 2011–14.
- The Catalina Foothills "Blue" Science Olympiad team won state championships eleven times, in 2006, consecutively from 2008 to 2014, in 2016, and from 2021 to 2022.
- The Speech and Debate team in 2018 was ranked fourth in Arizona by the National Forensics League, and had won the past three Division 4A State Championships.

== Performing arts ==
The Catalina Foothills Marching Band consists of around 240 students annually and has an international reputation. In the 2009–2010 school year, the band participated in the Fiesta Bowl parade and competition, placing fourth out of seven competing bands in the country. In both 2006 and 2019, the Falcon band represented Arizona at the annual Macy's Thanksgiving Day Parade. Soon after performing on live television in 2006, the Chinese-American Cultural Bridge Center, on behalf of the Olympic International Festival Committee, invited the band to perform in a youth festival in China a month before the 2008 Summer Olympics in Beijing during the summer of 2008. In the summer of 2012, the band traveled to the east coast of Australia for seven days, visiting local marching bands and experiencing local culture. They marched in the 2023 Rose Parade in Pasadena, CA.

In 2014 ten Falcons won Best One Act Play in the state, traveling to the International Thespian Festival in June 2015.

== Notable alumni ==
- Joe Brown (1995), NFL defensive lineman
- Matt Brase (2001), assistant coach for the Philadelphia 76ers
- Samantha Monahan (2007), soccer player
- Parker Young (2008), actor
- Luis González (2013), MLB outfielder
- Pava LaPere (2015), founder and CEO of EcoMap Technologies
