= 2021–22 Vanderbilt Commodores men's basketball team =

American college basketball season

2021–22 Vanderbilt Commodores men's basketball

Diamond Head Classic champions

NIT, Quarterfinals
- Conference: Southeastern Conference
- Record: 19–17 (7–11 SEC)
- Head coach: Jerry Stackhouse (3rd season)
- Associate head coach: Ed Conroy
- Assistant coaches: Michael Curry; Adam Mazarei
- Home arena: Memorial Gymnasium

2021–22 Southeastern Conference men's basketball standings
	Conf.				Overall
Team	W		L	PCT	W		L	PCT
No. 14 Auburn	15	–	3	.833	28	–	6	.824
No. 16 Kentucky	14	–	4	.778	26	–	8	.765
No. 15 Tennessee †	14	–	4	.778	27	–	8	.771
No. 8 Arkansas	13	–	5	.722	28	–	9	.757
LSU	9	–	9	.500	22	–	12	.647
Alabama	9	–	9	.500	19	–	14	.576
South Carolina	9	–	9	.500	18	–	13	.581
Texas A&M	9	–	9	.500	27	–	13	.675
Florida	9	–	9	.500	20	–	14	.588
Mississippi State	8	–	10	.444	18	–	16	.529
Vanderbilt	7	–	11	.389	19	–	17	.528
Missouri	5	–	13	.278	12	–	21	.364
Ole Miss	4	–	14	.222	13	–	19	.406
Georgia	1	–	17	.056	6	–	26	.188
† 2022 SEC tournament winner Rankings from AP poll

The 2021–22 Vanderbilt Commodores men's basketball team represented Vanderbilt University during the 2021–22 NCAA Division I men's basketball season. The team was led by third-year head coach Jerry Stackhouse, and played their home games at Memorial Gymnasium in Nashville, Tennessee as a member of the Southeastern Conference. They finished the season 19–17, 7–11 in SEC Play to finish in eleventh place. They defeated Georgia and Alabama to advance to the quarterfinals of the SEC tournament where they lost to Kentucky. They received an at-large bid to the National Invitation Tournament where they defeated Belmont and Dayton to advance to the quarterfinals where they lost to Xavier.

== Previous season ==
In a season limited due to the ongoing COVID-19 pandemic, the Commodores finished the 2020–21 season 9–16, 3–13 in SEC play to finish in last place. They defeated Texas A&M in the first round of the SEC tournament, but lost to Florida in the second round.

== Offseason ==
=== Departures ===
Name	Number	Pos.	Height	Weight	Year	Hometown	Reason for Leaving
Dylan Disu	1	F	6'9"	220	Sophomore	Pflugerville, TX	Transferred to Texas
Maxwell Evans	3	G	6'2"	190	Senior	Houston, TX	Transferred to TCU
D. J. Harvey	5	G	6'6"	235	RS Junior	Bowie, MD	Transferred to Detroit Mercy
Braelee Albert	11	G/F	6'5"	220	Sophomore	Los Angeles, CA	Walk-on; transferred to Tulane
Issac McBride	13	G	6'1"	190	RS Freshman	Little Rock, AR	Transferred to Oral Roberts
Isaiah Rice	14	G	5'11"	189	Senior	Indianapolis, IN	Walk-on; graduated
Clevon Brown	15	F	6'8"	232	RS Senior	San Antonio, TX	Graduate transferred to FIU
Akeem Odusipe	34	F	6'9"	230	Freshman	Lagos, Nigeria	Transferred to Kent State
Ejike Obinna	50	F/C	6'10"	243	RS Junior	Enugu, Nigeria	Transferred to Saint Joseph's

=== Incoming transfers ===
Name	Number	Pos.	Height	Weight	Year	Hometown	Previous school
Rodney Chatman	3	G	6'1"	215	Graduate Student	Lithonia, GA	Dayton
Terren Frank	15	F	6'8"	240	Sophomore	Los Angeles, CA	TCU
Liam Robbins	21	C	7'0"	250	Graduate Student	Davenport, IA	Minnesota
Jamaine Mann	23	G	6'6"	230	Sophomore	Hampton, Georgia	Gardner–Webb

=== 2021 recruiting class ===
College recruiting information
Name	Hometown	School	Height	Weight	Commit date
Shane Dezonie #26 SG	Tobyhanna, PA	Brewster Academy	6 ft 4 in (1.93 m)	190 lb (86 kg)	May 5, 2021
Shane Dezonie #26 SG	Recruit ratings: Rivals: 247Sports: ESPN: (82)				
Peyton Daniels #23 PG	East Point, GA	Tri Cities High School	6 ft 2 in (1.88 m)	175 lb (79 kg)	Jun 24, 2020
Peyton Daniels #23 PG	Recruit ratings: Rivals: 247Sports: ESPN: (81)				
Gabe Dorsey #49 SF	Pottstown, PA	The Hill School	6 ft 6 in (1.98 m)	200 lb (91 kg)	Aug 2, 2020
Gabe Dorsey #49 SF	Recruit ratings: Rivals: 247Sports: ESPN: (76)				
Overall recruit ranking:
Note: In many cases, Scout, Rivals, 247Sports, On3, and ESPN may conflict in their listings of height and weight.; In these cases, the average was taken. ESPN grades are on a 100-point scale.; Sources: "Vanderbilt 2021 Basketball Commitments". Rivals.; "ESPN". ESPN.; "2021 Team Ranking". Rivals.

=== 2022 recruiting class ===
College recruiting information (2022)
Name	Hometown	School	Height	Weight	Commit date
Lee Dort #24 C	Addison, TX	Greenhill High School	6 ft 9 in (2.06 m)	235 lb (107 kg)	Apr 7, 2021
Lee Dort #24 C	Recruit ratings: Rivals: 247Sports: ESPN: (82)				
Noah Shelby #23 PG	Dallas, TX	Greenhill High School	6 ft 3 in (1.91 m)	175 lb (79 kg)	Apr 7, 2021
Noah Shelby #23 PG	Recruit ratings: Rivals: 247Sports: ESPN: (82)				
Colin Smith #37 PF	Dallas, TX	Saint Mark's School	6 ft 7 in (2.01 m)	200 lb (91 kg)	Oct 10, 2021
Colin Smith #37 PF	Recruit ratings: Rivals: 247Sports: ESPN: (82)				
Malik Dia #34 PF	Nashville, TN	The Ensworth School	6 ft 7 in (2.01 m)	190 lb (86 kg)	Sep 5, 2021
Malik Dia #34 PF	Recruit ratings: Rivals: 247Sports: ESPN: (80)				
Overall recruit ranking:
Note: In many cases, Scout, Rivals, 247Sports, On3, and ESPN may conflict in their listings of height and weight.; In these cases, the average was taken. ESPN grades are on a 100-point scale.; Sources: "Vanderbilt 2022 Basketball Commitments". Rivals.; "ESPN". ESPN.; "2022 Team Ranking". Rivals.

== Roster ==
2021–22 Vanderbilt Commodores men's basketball team
Players
Coaches

Pos.	#	Name	Height	Weight	Year	Previous school	Hometown
G	0	Tyrin Lawrence	6 ft 4 in (1.93 m)	195 lb (88 kg)	So	Morgan County HS	Monticello, GA
G	1	Peyton Daniels	6 ft 2 in (1.88 m)	185 lb (84 kg)	Fr	Tri-Cities HS	Ellenwood, GA
G	2	Scotty Pippen Jr.	6 ft 3 in (1.91 m)	185 lb (84 kg)	Jr	Sierra Canyon School	Los Angeles, CA
G	3	Rodney Chatman	6 ft 1 in (1.85 m)	215 lb (98 kg)	GS	Dayton	Lithonia, GA
G/F	4	Jordan Wright	6 ft 6 in (1.98 m)	215 lb (98 kg)	Jr	The Dunham School	Baton Rouge, LA
G	5	Shane Dezonie	6 ft 5 in (1.96 m)	215 lb (98 kg)	Fr	Brewster Academy	Tobyhanna, PA
F	10	Myles Stute	6 ft 7 in (2.01 m)	210 lb (95 kg)	So	Gonzaga College HS	Washington, D.C.
G/F	11	Gabe Dorsey	6 ft 6 in (1.98 m)	215 lb (98 kg)	Fr	The Hill School	Westminster, MD
G	12	Trey Thomas	5 ft 11 in (1.8 m)	160 lb (73 kg)	So	Crestwood Prep	Durham, ON
F	15	Terren Frank	6 ft 8 in (2.03 m)	240 lb (109 kg)	So	TCU	Los Angeles, CA
G/F	20	Max Adelman	6 ft 5 in (1.96 m)	205 lb (93 kg)	So	The Hun School	Memphis, TN
C	21	Liam Robbins	7 ft 0 in (2.13 m)	250 lb (113 kg)	GS	Minnesota	Davenport, IA
G	22	Graham Calton	6 ft 5 in (1.96 m)	200 lb (91 kg)	Fr	Charlotte Latin School	Charlotte, NC
G	23	Jamaine Mann	6 ft 6 in (1.98 m)	230 lb (104 kg)	So	Gardner–Webb	Hampton, GA
G	33	Drew Weikert	6 ft 0 in (1.83 m)	170 lb (77 kg)	Sr	Montgomery Bell Academy	Nashville, TN
F	42	Quentin Millora-Brown	6 ft 10 in (2.08 m)	235 lb (107 kg)	RS Jr	Rice	Lorton, VA

Head coach

- Jerry Stackhouse (North Carolina)

Assistant coach(es)

- Ed Conroy (The Citadel)
- Michael Curry (Georgia Southern)
- Adam Mazarei (Redlands)

Legend

- (C) Team captain
- (S) Suspended
- (I) Ineligible
- (W) Walk-on
- Injured
- Current redshirt

Roster

== Schedule and results ==
Date time, TV	Rank^{#}	Opponent^{#}	Result	Record	High points	High rebounds	High assists	Site (attendance) city, state
Non-conference regular season
November 10, 2021*; 7:00 p.m., SECN+		Alabama State	W 91–72	1–0	16 – Wright	10 – Mann	5 – Millora–Brown	Memorial Gymnasium (5,459); Nashville, TN
November 14, 2021*; 7:00 p.m., SECN+		Texas State	W 79–60	2–0	30 – Pippen Jr.	6 – Millora–Brown	3 – Tied	Memorial Gymnasium (5,642); Nashville, TN
November 17, 2021*; 7:00 p.m., SECN+		VCU	L 37–48	2–1	15 – Wright	7 – Tied	2 – Pippen Jr.	Memorial Gymnasium (5,768); Nashville, TN
November 20, 2021*; 7:00 p.m., SECN+		Winthrop	W 77–63	3–1	28 – Wright	6 – Tied	3 – Thomas	Memorial Gymnasium (5,179); Nashville, TN
November 24, 2021*; 8:00 p.m., ACCN		at Pittsburgh	W 68–52	4–1	14 – Thomas	7 – Wright	5 – Pippen Jr.	Petersen Events Center (7,460); Pittsburgh, PA
November 29, 2021*; 7:00 p.m., SECN+		Mississippi Valley State	W 75–36	5–1	20 – Stute	6 – Dezonie	5 – Pippen Jr.	Memorial Gymnasium (5,181); Nashville, TN
December 4, 2021*; 8:00 p.m., ESPN+		at SMU; American/SEC Alliance	L 72–84	5–2	29 – Pippen Jr.	12 – Wright	4 – Millora-Brown	Moody Coliseum (3,835); Dallas, TX
December 7, 2021*; 7:00 p.m., SECN+		Temple	L 68–72 ^{OT}	5–3	16 – Wright	11 – Wright	3 – Wright	Memorial Gymnasium (5,239); Nashville, TN
December 10, 2021*; 7:00 p.m., SECN+		Loyola–Chicago	L 58–69	5–4	23 – Pippen Jr.	6 – Stute	1 – Tied	Memorial Gymnasium; Nashville, TN
December 18, 2021*; 1:30 p.m., SECN		Austin Peay	W 77–51	6–4	16 – Pippen Jr.	14 – Millora-Brown	2 – Tied	Memorial Gymnasium (6,186); Nashville, TN
December 22, 2021*; 11:00 p.m., ESPN2		at Hawaii; Diamond Head Classic quarterfinals	W 68–54	7–4	21 – Pippen Jr.	9 – Millora-Brown	2 – Tied	Stan Sheriff Center (4,463); Honolulu, HI
December 23, 2021*; 9:00 p.m., ESPN2		vs. BYU; Diamond Head Classic semifinals	W 69–67	8–4	23 – Pippen Jr.	10 – Millora-Brown	3 – Tied	Stan Sheriff Center; Honolulu, HI
December 25, 2021*; 7:30 p.m., ESPN2		vs. Stanford; Diamond Head Classic championship	Canceled due to COVID issues					Stan Sheriff Center; Honolulu, HI
SEC regular season
January 4, 2022; 7:30 p.m., SECN		at Arkansas	W 75–74	9–4 (1–0)	22 – Pippen Jr.	6 – Wright	4 – Wright	Bud Walton Arena (19,200); Fayetteville, AR
January 8, 2022; 11:00 a.m., ESPNU		South Carolina	L 70–72	9–5 (1–1)	19 – Stute	6 – Mann	6 – Pippen Jr.	Memorial Gymnasium (5,581); Nashville, TN
January 11, 2022; 6:00 p.m., ESPN		No. 18 Kentucky	L 66–78	9–6 (1–2)	32 – Pippen Jr.	7 – Millora-Brown	4 – Pippen Jr.	Memorial Gymnasium (8,343); Nashville, TN
January 15, 2022; 5:00 p.m., ESPN2		at Georgia	W 73–66	10–6 (2–2)	20 – Wright	12 – Wright	7 – Pippen Jr.	Stegeman Coliseum (6,980); Athens, GA
January 18, 2022; 8:00 p.m., SECN		No. 24 Tennessee	L 60–68	10–7 (2–3)	18 – Pippen Jr.	6 – Millora-Brown	3 – Wright	Memorial Gymnasium (7,588); Nashville, TN
January 22, 2022; 12:30 p.m., SECN		at Florida	L 42–61	10–8 (2–4)	7 – Wright	8 – Millora-Brown	3 – Wright	O'Connell Center (10,345); Gainesville, FL
January 26, 2022; 6:00 p.m., ESPNU		at South Carolina	L 61–70	10–9 (2–5)	24 – Pippen Jr.	8 – Pippen Jr.	5 – Pippen Jr.	Colonial Life Arena (8,768); Columbia, SC
January 29, 2022; 5:00 p.m., SECN		Georgia	W 85–77	11–9 (3–5)	23 – Pippen Jr.	6 – Stute	9 – Pippen Jr.	Memorial Gymnasium (6,887); Nashville, TN
February 2, 2022; 6:00 p.m., SECN		at No. 5 Kentucky	L 70–77	11–10 (3–6)	33 – Pippen Jr.	10 – Wright	5 – Pippen Jr.	Rupp Arena (19,418); Lexington, KY
February 5, 2022; 5:00 p.m., SECN		No. 25 LSU	W 75–66	12–10 (4–6)	24 – Chatman	7 – Wright	9 – Pippen Jr.	Memorial Gymnasium (7,381); Nashville, TN
February 8, 2022; 8:00 p.m., SECN		Missouri	W 70–62	13–10 (5–6)	19 – Pippen Jr.	11 – Tied	3 – Pippen Jr.	Memorial Gymnasium (6,406); Nashville, TN
February 12, 2022; 5:00 p.m., SECN		at No. 19 Tennessee	L 64–73	13–11 (5–7)	23 – Pippen Jr.	6 – Wright	6 – Pippen Jr.	Thompson-Boling Arena (20,019); Knoxville, TN
February 16, 2022; 8:00 p.m., SECN		at No. 2 Auburn	L 80–94	13–12 (5–8)	29 – Pippen Jr.	6 – Wright	6 – Pippen Jr.	Auburn Arena (9,121); Auburn, AL
February 19, 2022; 5:00 p.m., SECN		Texas A&M	W 72–67	14–12 (6–8)	24 – Pippen Jr.	8 – Tied	3 – Wright	Memorial Gymnasium (6,702); Nashville, TN
February 22, 2022; 8:00 p.m., SECN		No. 24 Alabama	L 72–74	14–13 (6–9)	26 – Pippen Jr.	7 – Tied	6 – Pippen Jr.	Memorial Gymnasium (7,041); Nashville, TN
February 26, 2022; 12:00 p.m., SECN		at Mississippi State	L 69–74	14–14 (6–10)	32 – Pippen Jr.	7 – Robbins	4 – Tied	Humphrey Coliseum (6,829); Starkville, MS
March 1, 2022; 7:30 p.m., SECN		Florida	L 78–82	14–15 (6–11)	29 – Pippen Jr.	9 – Wright	5 – Pippen Jr.	Memorial Gymnasium (6,568); Nashville, TN
March 5, 2022; 5:00 p.m., SECN		at Ole Miss	W 63–61	15–15 (7–11)	22 – Pippen Jr.	11 – Wright	6 – Pippen Jr.	SJB Pavilion (6,173); Oxford, MS
SEC tournament
March 9, 2022; 7:00 pm, SECN	(11)	vs. (14) Georgia; First Round	W 86–51	16–15	14 – Pippen Jr.	7 – Wright	3 – Thomas	Amalie Arena (7,121); Tampa, FL
March 10, 2022; 7:00 pm, SECN	(11)	vs. (6) Alabama; Second Round	W 82–76	17–15	26 – Pippen Jr.	11 – Wright	7 – Pippen Jr.	Amalie Arena (12,121); Tampa, FL
March 11, 2022; 7:00 pm, SECN	(11)	vs. (3) No. 5 Kentucky; Quarterfinals	L 71–77	17–16	27 – Wright	6 – Tied	7 – Pippen Jr.	Amalie Arena (17,132); Tampa, FL
NIT tournament
March 15, 2022*; 6:00 p.m., ESPN2	(4)	Belmont; First Round – Dayton Bracket	W 82–71	18–16	24 – Wright	13 – Millora-Brown	6 – Pippen Jr.	Memorial Gymnasium (7,773); Nashville, TN
March 19, 2022*; 2:00 p.m., ESPN2	(4)	(1) Dayton; Second Round – Dayton Bracket	W 70–68 ^{OT}	19–16	32 – Pippen Jr.	6 – Millora-Brown	7 – Pippen Jr.	Memorial Gymnasium (8,323); Nashville, TN
March 22, 2022*; 8:00 p.m., ESPN	(4)	at (2) Xavier; Quarterfinals – Dayton Bracket	L 73–75	19–17	28 – Pippen Jr.	9 – Pippen Jr.	7 – Pippen Jr.	Cintas Center (3,240); Cincinnati, OH
*Non-conference game. ^{#}Rankings from AP Poll. (#) Tournament seedings in parentheses. All times are in Central Time.

== See also ==
- 2021–22 Vanderbilt Commodores women's basketball team
