= 2021–22 Tennessee Volunteers basketball team =

Collegiate basketball team

2021–22 Tennessee Volunteers basketball

SEC tournament champions

NCAA tournament, Second Round
- Conference: Southeastern Conference

Ranking
- Coaches: No. 15
- AP: No. 5
- Record: 27–8 (14–4 SEC)
- Head coach: Rick Barnes (7th season)
- Associate head coach: Michael Schwartz
- Assistant coaches: Justin Gainey; Rod Clark
- Home arena: Thompson–Boling Arena

2021–22 Southeastern Conference men's basketball standings
	Conf.				Overall
Team	W		L	PCT	W		L	PCT
No. 14 Auburn	15	–	3	.833	28	–	6	.824
No. 16 Kentucky	14	–	4	.778	26	–	8	.765
No. 15 Tennessee †	14	–	4	.778	27	–	8	.771
No. 8 Arkansas	13	–	5	.722	28	–	9	.757
LSU	9	–	9	.500	22	–	12	.647
Alabama	9	–	9	.500	19	–	14	.576
South Carolina	9	–	9	.500	18	–	13	.581
Texas A&M	9	–	9	.500	27	–	13	.675
Florida	9	–	9	.500	20	–	14	.588
Mississippi State	8	–	10	.444	18	–	16	.529
Vanderbilt	7	–	11	.389	19	–	17	.528
Missouri	5	–	13	.278	12	–	21	.364
Ole Miss	4	–	14	.222	13	–	19	.406
Georgia	1	–	17	.056	6	–	26	.188
† 2022 SEC tournament winner Rankings from AP poll

The 2021–22 Tennessee Volunteers basketball team represented the University of Tennessee during the 2021–22 NCAA Division I men's basketball season. The team is led by seventh-year head coach Rick Barnes, and plays their home games at Thompson–Boling Arena in Knoxville, Tennessee as a member of the Southeastern Conference. They finished the season 27–8, 14–4 in SEC play to finish in a tie for second place. As the No. 2 seed in the SEC tournament, they defeated Mississippi State, Kentucky and Texas A&M to win their first SEC Tournament title since 1979. They received the conference's automatic bid to the NCAA tournament as the No. 3 seed in the South Region, where they defeated Longwood in the First Round before being upset by Michigan in the Second Round.

== Previous season ==
The Volunteers finished the 2020–21 season 18–9, 10–7 in SEC play to finish in fourth place. They defeated Florida in the quarterfinals of the SEC tournament before losing to Alabama in the semifinals. They received an at-large bid to the NCAA tournament as a 5th seed in the Midwest Region where they got upset by Oregon State in the first round.

== Offseason ==
=== Departures ===
Name	Number	Pos.	Height	Weight	Year	Hometown	Reason for departure
Davonte Gaines	0	G	6'7"	166	Sophomore	Buffalo, NY	Transferred to George Mason
Drew Pember	3	F	6'9"	207	Sophomore	Knoxville, TN	Transferred to UNC Asheville
Jaden Springer	11	G	6'4"	204	Freshman	Charlotte, NC	Declare for 2021 NBA draft
Corey Walker Jr.	15	F	6'8"	219	Freshman	Hastings, FL	Transferred to South Florida
Yves Pons	35	G/F	6'6"	215	Senior	Fuveau, France	Graduated/went undrafted in 2021 NBA draft
Keon Johnson	45	G	6'5"	186	Freshman	Shelbyville, TN	Declare for 2021 NBA draft
E. J. Anosike	55	F	6'7"	245	Senior	East Orange, NJ	Graduate transferred to Cal State Fullerton

=== Incoming transfers ===
Name	Number	Pos.	Height	Weight	Year	Hometown	Previous school
Justin Powell	24	G	6'6"	197	Sophomore	Prospect, KY	Auburn

=== 2021 recruiting class ===
College recruiting information
Name	Hometown	School	Height	Weight	Commit date
Kennedy Chandler #1 PG	Memphis, TN	Sunrise Christian Academy	6 ft 1 in (1.85 m)	170 lb (77 kg)	Aug 14, 2020
Kennedy Chandler #1 PG	Recruit ratings: Scout: Rivals: 247Sports: ESPN: (95)				
Brandon Huntley-Hatfield #7 PF	Clarksville, TN	Scotland Campus Prep	6 ft 9 in (2.06 m)	215 lb (98 kg)	Apr 15, 2021
Brandon Huntley-Hatfield #7 PF	Recruit ratings: Scout: Rivals: 247Sports: ESPN: (91)				
Jonas Aidoo #7 C	Durham, NC	Liberty Heights Athletic Institute	6 ft 11 in (2.11 m)	205 lb (93 kg)	Apr 14, 2021
Jonas Aidoo #7 C	Recruit ratings: Scout: Rivals: 247Sports: ESPN: (85)				
Jahmai Mashack #18 SG	Etiwanda, CA	Etiwanda High School	6 ft 4 in (1.93 m)	180 lb (82 kg)	Sep 8, 2020
Jahmai Mashack #18 SG	Recruit ratings: Scout: Rivals: 247Sports: ESPN: (83)				
Handje Tamba* #32 C	Knoxville, TN	Knoxville Catholic High School	6 ft 10 in (2.08 m)	215 lb (98 kg)	Jul 27, 2021
Handje Tamba* #32 C	Recruit ratings: Scout: Rivals: 247Sports: ESPN: (80)				
Quentin Diboundje #56 SG	Montverde, FL	Montverde Academy	6 ft 6 in (1.98 m)	185 lb (84 kg)	Apr 7, 2021
Quentin Diboundje #56 SG	Recruit ratings: Scout: Rivals: 247Sports: ESPN: (75)				
Zakai Zeigler; PG	Bronx, NY	Immaculate Conception School	5 ft 10 in (1.78 m)	165 lb (75 kg)	Aug 27, 2021
Zakai Zeigler; PG	Recruit ratings: Scout: Rivals: 247Sports: ESPN: (NR)				
Overall recruit ranking:
Note: In many cases, Scout, Rivals, 247Sports, On3, and ESPN may conflict in their listings of height and weight.; In these cases, the average was taken. ESPN grades are on a 100-point scale.; Sources: "Rivals.com 2021 Tennessee Basketball Commitments". Rivals.; "2021 Team Ranking". Rivals.

*Originally class of 2022, but reclassified to 2021.

=== 2022 recruiting class ===
College recruiting information (2022)
Name	Hometown	School	Height	Weight	Commit date
B. J. Edwards #21 PG	Knoxville, TN	Knoxville Catholic High School	6 ft 1 in (1.85 m)	165 lb (75 kg)	Jun 30, 2021
B. J. Edwards #21 PG	Recruit ratings: Scout: Rivals: 247Sports: ESPN: (82)				
Overall recruit ranking:
Note: In many cases, Scout, Rivals, 247Sports, On3, and ESPN may conflict in their listings of height and weight.; In these cases, the average was taken. ESPN grades are on a 100-point scale.; Sources: "Rivals.com 2021 Tennessee Basketball Commitments". Rivals.; "2021 Team Ranking". Rivals.

== Roster ==
2021–22 Tennessee Volunteers men's basketball team
Players
Coaches

Pos.	#	Name	Height	Weight	Year	Previous school	Hometown
F	0	Jonas Aidoo	6 ft 11 in (2.11 m)	234 lb (106 kg)	Fr	Liberty Heights Athletic Institute	Durham, NC
G	1	Kennedy Chandler	6 ft 0 in (1.83 m)	171 lb (78 kg)	Fr	Sunrise Christian Academy (KS)	Memphis, TN
F	2	Brandon Huntley-Hatfield	6 ft 10 in (2.08 m)	246 lb (112 kg)	Fr	Scotland Campus Prep (PA)	Clarksville, TN
G	3	Quentin Diboundje	6 ft 5 in (1.96 m)	217 lb (98 kg)	Fr	Montverde Academy	Montpellier, France
G	5	Zakai Zeigler	5 ft 9 in (1.75 m)	167 lb (76 kg)	Fr	Our Savior Lutheran	Long Island, NY
F	10	John Fulkerson	6 ft 9 in (2.06 m)	219 lb (99 kg)	GS	Christ School	Kingsport, TN
G	12	Victor Bailey Jr.	6 ft 4 in (1.93 m)	182 lb (83 kg)	RS Sr	Oregon	Austin, TX
F	13	Olivier Nkamhoua	6 ft 8 in (2.03 m)	232 lb (105 kg)	Jr	Bishop Walsh School	Helsinki, Finland
G	15	Jahmai Mashack	6 ft 4 in (1.93 m)	196 lb (89 kg)	Fr	Etiwanda HS	Fontana, CA
G	21	Kent Gilbert (W)	6 ft 1 in (1.85 m)	175 lb (79 kg)	So	Conley HS	Greenville, NC
G	24	Justin Powell	6 ft 6 in (1.98 m)	197 lb (89 kg)	So	Auburn	Prospect, KY
G	25	Santiago Véscovi	6 ft 3 in (1.91 m)	191 lb (87 kg)	Jr	NBA Global Academy	Montevideo, Uruguay
G	30	Josiah-Jordan James	6 ft 6 in (1.98 m)	214 lb (97 kg)	Jr	Porter-Gaud School	Charleston, SC
G	31	Isaiah Sulack (W)	6 ft 5 in (1.96 m)	186 lb (84 kg)	RS Jr	Bossier Parish CC	Knoxville, TN
F	32	Handje Tamba	6 ft 11 in (2.11 m)	229 lb (104 kg)	Fr	Knoxville Catholic HS	Knoxville, TN
F	33	Uroš Plavšić	7 ft 0 in (2.13 m)	251 lb (114 kg)	RS Jr	Arizona State	Ivanjica, Serbia
F	35	Brock Jancek (W)	6 ft 8 in (2.03 m)	228 lb (103 kg)	Sr	Knoxville Catholic HS	Knoxville, TN

Head coach

- Rick Barnes (Lenoir–Rhyne)

Assistant coach(es)

- Michael Schwartz (Texas)
- Justin Gainey (NC State)
- Rod Clark (Lindsey Wilson)

Legend

- (C) Team captain
- (S) Suspended
- (I) Ineligible
- (W) Walk-on
- Injured
- Current redshirt

Roster

== Schedule and results ==
Date time, TV	Rank^{#}	Opponent^{#}	Result	Record	High points	High rebounds	High assists	Site (attendance) city, state
Exhibition
October 30, 2021*; 3:00 p.m., SECN+	No. 18	Lenoir–Rhyne	W 103–62		21 – Chandler	12 – Huntley-Hatfield	7 – Vescovi	Thompson–Boling Arena (15,476); Knoxville, TN
Regular season
November 9, 2021*; 7:00 p.m., SECN	No. 18	UT Martin	W 90–62	1–0	20 – Tied	14 – Nkamhoua	4 – Tied	Thompson–Boling Arena (16,425); Knoxville, TN
November 14, 2021*; 12:00 p.m., SECN	No. 18	East Tennessee State	W 94–62	2–0	23 – Nkamhoua	10 – Fulkerson	6 – Chandler	Thompson–Boling Arena (16,564); Knoxville, TN
November 20, 2021*; 1:00 p.m., ESPNews	No. 17	vs. No. 5 Villanova; Hall of Fame Tip Off semifinals	L 53–71	2–1	23 – Vescovi	6 – Tied	2 – Tied	Mohegan Sun Arena; Uncasville, CT
November 21, 2021*; 3:30 p.m., ESPN	No. 17	vs. No. 18 North Carolina; Hall of Fame Tip Off 3rd Place Game	W 89–72	3–1	18 – Zeigler	9 – Vescovi	8 – Chandler	Mohegan Sun Arena (9,100); Uncasville, CT
November 26, 2021*; 3:00 p.m., SECN+	No. 15	Tennessee Tech	W 80–69	4–1	18 – Nkamhoua	7 – Vescovi	7 – Vescovi	Thompson–Boling Arena (16,909); Knoxville, TN
November 30, 2021*; 7:00 p.m., SECN	No. 13	Presbyterian	W 86–44	5–1	15 – Tied	5 – Fulkerson	4 – Tied	Thompson–Boling Arena (15,768); Knoxville, TN
December 4, 2021*; 2:00 p.m., FS1	No. 13	at Colorado	W 69–54	6–1	27 – Kennedy	9 – James	3 – Zeigler	CU Events Center (8,688); Boulder, CO
December 7, 2021*; 7:00 p.m., ESPN	No. 13	vs. Texas Tech; Jimmy V Classic	L 52–57 ^{OT}	6–2	10 – Fulkerson	10 – Fulkerson	5 – Chandler	Madison Square Garden; New York, NY
December 11, 2021*; 4:30 p.m., SECN	No. 13	UNC Greensboro	W 76–36	7–2	12 – Tied	4 – Tied	8 – Vescovi	Thompson–Boling Arena (16,074); Knoxville, TN
December 14, 2021*; 7:00 p.m., SECN+	No. 18	USC Upstate	W 96–52	8–2	21 – Nkamhoua	8 – Huntley-Hatfield	10 – Chandler	Thompson–Boling Arena (14,699); Knoxville, TN
December 18, 2021*; 12:00 p.m., ESPN2	No. 18	vs. Memphis; Nashville Showcase	Canceled due to COVID-19 issues within Memphis program					Bridgestone Arena; Nashville, TN
December 22, 2021*; 7:00 p.m., ESPN2	No. 19	No. 6 Arizona	W 77–73	9–2	24 – Fulkerson	10 – Fulkerson	4 – Chandler	Thompson–Boling Arena (20,408); Knoxville, TN
December 29, 2021; 9:00 p.m., ESPN2	No. 14	at No. 19 Alabama	L 68–73	9–3 (0–1)	15 – Nkamhoua	9 – Tied	4 – Zeigler	Coleman Coliseum (15,383); Tuscaloosa, AL
January 5, 2022; 7:00 p.m., SECN	No. 18	Ole Miss	W 66–60 ^{OT}	10–3 (1–1)	17 – Vescovi	8 – James	7 – Chandler	Thompson–Boling Arena (15,617); Knoxville, TN
January 8, 2022; 6:00 p.m., ESPN2	No. 18	at No. 21 LSU	L 67–79	10–4 (1–2)	19 – Chandler	7 – Tied	3 – Tied	Pete Maravich Assembly Center (12,881); Baton Rouge, LA
January 11, 2022; 6:30 p.m., SECN	No. 22	South Carolina	W 66–46	11–4 (2–2)	14 – Vescovi	12 – James	5 – Vescovi	Thompson–Boling Arena (15,262); Knoxville, TN
January 15, 2022; 1:00 p.m., ESPN	No. 22	at No. 18 Kentucky; Rivalry	L 79–107	11–5 (2–3)	20 – Vescovi	4 – James	3 – Chandler	Rupp Arena (20,278); Lexington, KY
January 18, 2022; 9:00 p.m., SECN	No. 24	at Vanderbilt	W 68–60	12–5 (3–3)	14 – Vescovi	7 – Tied	4 – Chandler	Memorial Gymnasium (7,588); Nashville, TN
January 22, 2022; 6:00 p.m., ESPN	No. 24	No. 13 LSU	W 64–50	13–5 (4–3)	16 – Vescovi	6 – Tied	6 – Chandler	Thompson–Boling Arena (21,061); Knoxville, TN
January 26, 2022; 6:00 p.m., ESPN2	No. 18	Florida	W 78–71	14–5 (5–3)	23 – Vescovi	9 – James	5 – Chandler	Thompson–Boling Arena (20,789); Knoxville, TN
January 29, 2022*; 8:00 p.m., ESPN	No. 18	at Texas; Big 12/SEC Challenge	L 51–52	14–6	12 – Zeigler	8 – Nkamhoua	4 – Vescovi	Frank Erwin Center (16,540); Austin, TX
February 1, 2022; 7:00 p.m., SECN	No. 22	Texas A&M	W 90–80	15–6 (6–3)	16 – Chandler	8 – James	7 – Chandler	Thompson–Boling Arena (16,607); Knoxville, TN
February 5, 2022; 1:00 p.m., CBS	No. 22	at South Carolina	W 81–57	16–6 (7–3)	20 – James	8 – Plavsic	10 – Chandler	Colonial Life Arena (12,391); Columbia, SC
February 9, 2022; 7:00 p.m., ESPN2	No. 19	at Mississippi State	W 82–73	17–6 (8–3)	18 – Tied	5 – Tied	7 – Vescovi	Humphrey Coliseum (7,014); Starkville, MS
February 12, 2022; 6:00 p.m., SECN	No. 19	Vanderbilt	W 73–64	18–6 (9–3)	16 – Zeigler	10 – James	5 – Zeigler	Thompson–Boling Arena (20,019); Knoxville, TN
February 15, 2022; 9:00 p.m., ESPN	No. 16	No. 4 Kentucky; Rivalry	W 76–63	19–6 (10–3)	18 – Vescovi	8 – Fulkerson	6 – Chandler	Thompson–Boling Arena (21,678); Knoxville, TN
February 19, 2022; 4:00 p.m., ESPN	No. 16	at No. 23 Arkansas	L 48–58	19–7 (10–4)	12 – Zeigler	11 – Vescovi	2 – Chandler	Bud Walton Arena (19,200); Fayetteville, AR
February 22, 2022; 7:00 p.m., SECN	No. 17	at Missouri	W 80–61	20–7 (11–4)	23 – Chandler	8 – Chandler	6 – Chandler	Mizzou Arena (7,253); Columbia, MO
February 26, 2022; 4:00 p.m., ESPN	No. 17	No. 3 Auburn	W 67–62	21–7 (12–4)	14 – Vescovi	9 – Tied	2 – Tied	Thompson–Boling Arena (21,678); Knoxville, TN
March 1, 2022; 6:30 p.m., SECN	No. 13	at Georgia	W 75–68	22–7 (13–4)	23 – James	10 – Plavsic	5 – James	Stegeman Coliseum (6,139); Athens, GA
March 5, 2022; 12:00 p.m., ESPN	No. 13	No. 14 Arkansas	W 78–74	23–7 (14–4)	15 – Tied	7 – James	6 – Zeigler	Thompson–Boling Arena (21,678); Knoxville, TN
SEC Tournament
March 11, 2022; 6:00 p.m., SECN	(2) No. 9	vs. (10) Mississippi State; Quarterfinals	W 72–59	24–7	16 – James	6 – Fulkerson	8 – Zeigler	Amalie Arena (17,132); Tampa, FL
March 12, 2022; 3:00 p.m., ESPN	(2) No. 9	vs. (3) No. 5 Kentucky; Semifinals	W 69–62	25–7	19 – Chandler	8 – Plavšić	3 – Tied	Amalie Arena (20,670); Tampa, FL
March 13, 2022; 1:00 p.m., ESPN	(2) No. 9	vs. (8) Texas A&M; Championship	W 65–50	26–7	17 – Vescovi	12 – Fulkerson	7 – Chandler	Amalie Arena (16,643); Tampa, FL
NCAA tournament
March 17, 2022*; 2:45 p.m., CBS	(3 S) No. 5	vs. (14 S) Longwood; First Round	W 88–56	27–7	18 – Vescovi	9 – James	7 – Vescovi	Gainbridge Fieldhouse (15,782); Indianapolis, IN
March 19, 2022*; 5:50 p.m., CBS	(3 S) No. 5	vs. (11 S) Michigan; Second Round	L 68–76	27–8	19 – Chandler	9 – Plavsic	9 – Chandler	Gainbridge Fieldhouse (17,838); Indianapolis, IN
*Non-conference game. ^{#}Rankings from AP Poll. (#) Tournament seedings in parentheses. S=South. All times are in Eastern Time.

== Rankings ==
Ranking movements Legend: ██ Increase in ranking ██ Decrease in ranking т = Tied with team above or below
	Week																			
Poll	Pre	1	2	3	4	5	6	7	8	9	10	11	12	13	14	15	16	17	18	Final
AP	18	17	15	13	13	18	19	14	18	22	24	18	22	19	16	17	13	9т	5	Not released
Coaches	17т	17т*	17	15	14	18	19	15	18	23	25T	20	20	18	13	17	13	11	8	15

*Coaches did not release a week 1 poll.

== See also ==
- 2021–22 Tennessee Lady Volunteers basketball team
