= 2022 SEC men's basketball tournament =

American college basketball postseason tournament

- Classification: Division I
- Season: 2021–22
- Teams: 14
- Site: Amalie Arena; Tampa, Florida
- Champions: Tennessee (5th title)
- Winning coach: Rick Barnes (1st title)
- MVP: Kennedy Chandler (Tennessee)
- Attendance: 100,076
- Television: SEC Network, ESPN

2021–22 Southeastern Conference men's basketball standings
	Conf.				Overall
Team	W		L	PCT	W		L	PCT
No. 14 Auburn	15	–	3	.833	28	–	6	.824
No. 16 Kentucky	14	–	4	.778	26	–	8	.765
No. 15 Tennessee †	14	–	4	.778	27	–	8	.771
No. 8 Arkansas	13	–	5	.722	28	–	9	.757
LSU	9	–	9	.500	22	–	12	.647
Alabama	9	–	9	.500	19	–	14	.576
South Carolina	9	–	9	.500	18	–	13	.581
Texas A&M	9	–	9	.500	27	–	13	.675
Florida	9	–	9	.500	20	–	14	.588
Mississippi State	8	–	10	.444	18	–	16	.529
Vanderbilt	7	–	11	.389	19	–	17	.528
Missouri	5	–	13	.278	12	–	21	.364
Ole Miss	4	–	14	.222	13	–	19	.406
Georgia	1	–	17	.056	6	–	26	.188
† 2022 SEC tournament winner Rankings from AP poll

The 2022 Southeastern Conference men's basketball tournament was the postseason men's basketball tournament for the 2021–22 Southeastern Conference men's basketball season, held on March 9–13, 2022 at the Amalie Arena in Tampa, Florida. The winner, the Tennessee Volunteers, received the conference's automatic bid to the 2022 NCAA tournament.

== Seeds ==
All 14 SEC teams participated in the tournament. Teams were seeded by record within the conference, with a tiebreaker system to seed teams with identical conference records. The top 10 teams received a first round bye and the top four teams received a double bye, automatically advancing them into the quarterfinals.

Seed	School	Conference Record	Tiebreaker
1	Auburn	15–3	
2	Tennessee	14–4	1–1 vs. Kentucky, 1–0 vs. Auburn
3	Kentucky	14–4	1–1 vs. Tennessee, 0–1 vs. Auburn
4	Arkansas	13–5	
5	LSU	9–9	4–2 vs. Alabama/South Carolina/Texas A&M/Florida
6	Alabama	9–9	3–2 vs. LSU/South Carolina/Texas A&M/Florida
7	South Carolina	9–9	2–2 vs. LSU/Alabama/Texas A&M/Florida
8	Texas A&M	9–9	2–3 vs. LSU/Alabama/South Carolina/Florida
9	Florida	9–9	1–3 vs. LSU/Alabama/South Carolina/Texas A&M
10	Mississippi State	8–10	
11	Vanderbilt	7–11	
12	Missouri	5–13	
13	Ole Miss	4–14	
14	Georgia	1–17	

== Schedule ==
Game	Time (ET)	Matchup^{#}	Score	Television	Attendance
First round – Wednesday, March 9
1	6:00 pm	No. 12 Missouri vs. No. 13 Ole Miss	72–60	SECN	7,121
2	8:00 pm	No. 11 Vanderbilt vs No. 14 Georgia	86–51	SECN	7,121
Second round – Thursday, March 10
3	12:00 pm	No. 8 Texas A&M vs. No. 9 Florida	83–80 (OT)	SECN	10,295
4	2:00 pm	No. 5 LSU vs. No. 12 Missouri	76–68	SECN	10,295
5	6:00 pm	No. 7 South Carolina vs. No. 10 Mississippi State	51–73	SECN	12,121
6	8:00 pm	No. 6 Alabama vs. No. 11 Vanderbilt	76–82	SECN	12,121
Quarterfinals – Friday, March 11
7	12:00 pm	No. 1 Auburn vs. No. 8 Texas A&M	62–67	ESPN	16,094
8	2:00 pm	No. 4 Arkansas vs. No. 5 LSU	79–67	ESPN	16,094
9	6:00 pm	No. 2 Tennessee vs. No. 10 Mississippi State	72–59	SECN	17,132
10	8:00 pm	No. 3 Kentucky vs. No. 11 Vanderbilt	77–71	SECN	17,132
Semifinals – Saturday, March 12
11	1:00 pm	No. 8 Texas A&M vs. No. 4 Arkansas	82–64	ESPN	20,670
12	3:00 pm	No. 2 Tennessee vs. No. 3 Kentucky	69–62	ESPN	20,670
Championship – Sunday, March 13
13	1:00 pm	No. 8 Texas A&M vs. No. 2 Tennessee	50–65	ESPN	16,643

== Bracket ==
First round Wednesday, March 9 SEC Network
12	Missouri	72
13	Ole Miss	60
11	Vanderbilt	86
14	Georgia	51

Second round Thursday, March 10; SEC Network
8	Texas A&M	83*
9	Florida	80
5	LSU	76
12	Missouri	68
7	South Carolina	51
10	Mississippi State	73
6	Alabama	76
11	Vanderbilt	82

Quarterfinals; Friday, March 11; ESPN/SEC Network
1	Auburn	62
8	Texas A&M	67
4	Arkansas	79
5	LSU	67
2	Tennessee	72
10	Mississippi State	59
3	Kentucky	77
11	Vanderbilt	71

Semifinals; Saturday, March 12; ESPN
8	Texas A&M	82
4	Arkansas	64
2	Tennessee	69
3	Kentucky	62

Championship; Sunday, March 13; ESPN
8	Texas A&M	50
2	Tennessee	65

* – Denotes overtime period

== Game summaries ==
=== First round ===
SECN

March 9
6:00 p.m.

No. 12 Missouri 72, No. 13 Ole Miss 60
Scoring by half: 32–32, 40–28
Pts: K. Brown (16); Rebs: T. Brazile (8); Asts: K. Brown (4)	Pts: M. Murrell (16); Rebs: J. Brakefield (5); Asts: Tied (4)

Amalie Arena
Tampa, FL
Attendance: 7,121
Referees: Tony Greene, Terry Wymer, Owen Shortt

SECN

March 9
8:00 p.m.

No. 11 Vanderbilt 86, No. 14 Georgia 51
Scoring by half: 35–14, 51–37
Pts: S. Pippen Jr. (14); Rebs: J. Wright (7); Asts: T. Thomas (3)	Pts: B. Bridges (15); Rebs: B. Bridges (11); Asts: A. Cook (5)

Amalie Arena
Tampa, FL
Attendance: 7,121
Referees: Doug Shows, Mike Nance, Byron Jarrett

=== Second round ===
SECN

March 10
12:00 p.m.

No. 8 Texas A&M 83, No. 9 Florida 80 (OT)
Scoring by half: 33–25, 37–45 Overtime: 13–10
Pts: H. Coleman III (22); Rebs: H. Coleman III (8); Asts: T. Radford (4)	Pts: K. Reeves (21); Rebs: N. Lane (9); Asts: P. Fleming Jr. (4)

Amalie Arena
Tampa, FL
Attendance: 10,295
Referees: Joe Lindsay, Pat Adams, Steve Anderson

SECN

March 10
2:00 p.m.

No. 5 LSU 76, No. 12 Missouri 68
Scoring by half: 39–23, 37–45
Pts: T. Eason (19); Rebs: D. Days (7); Asts: B. Murray (9)	Pts: D. Gordon (19); Rebs: T. Brazile (8); Asts: K. Brown (5)

Amalie Arena
Tampa, FL
Attendance: 10,295
Referees: Don Daily, Patrick Evans, Rob Rorke

SECN

March 10
6:00 p.m.

No. 7 South Carolina 51, No. 10 Mississippi State 73
Scoring by half: 34–36, 17–37
Pts: E. Stevenson (18); Rebs: W. Leveque (7); Asts: E. Stevenson (5)	Pts: T. Smith (20); Rebs: A. Garcia (14); Asts: S. Moore (5)

Amalie Arena
Tampa, FL
Attendance: 12,121
Referees: Terry Oglesby, Chuck Jones, K.B. Burdett

SECN

March 10
8:00 p.m.

No. 6 Alabama 76, No. 11 Vanderbilt 82
Scoring by half: 38–28, 38–54
Pts: J. Shackelford (21); Rebs: Tied (7); Asts: J. Davison (8)	Pts: S. Pippen Jr. (26); Rebs: J. Wright (11); Asts: S. Pippen Jr. (7)

Amalie Arena
Tampa, FL
Attendance: 12,121
Referees: Tony Greene, Bart Lenox, Owen Shortt

=== Quarterfinals ===
ESPN

March 11
12:00 p.m.

No. 1 Auburn 62, No. 8 Texas A&M 67
Scoring by half: 21–37, 41–30
Pts: J. Smith (17); Rebs: Tied (9); Asts: J. Smith (4)	Pts: T. Radford (19); Rebs: H. Coleman III (10); Asts: H. Coleman III (3)

Amalie Arena
Tampa, FL
Attendance: 16,094
Referees: Don Daily, Terry Wymer, K.B. Burdett

ESPN

March 11
2:00 p.m.

No. 4 Arkansas 79, No. 5 LSU 67
Scoring by half: 29–26, 50–41
Pts: A. Toney (22); Rebs: J. Williams (11); Asts: J. Notae (3)	Pts: T. Eason (15); Rebs: D. Days (10); Asts: B. Murray (4)

Amalie Arena
Tampa, FL
Attendance: 16,094
Referees: Joe Lindsay, Mike Nance, Patrick Evans

SECN

March 11
6:00 p.m.

No. 2 Tennessee 72, No. 10 Mississippi State 59
Scoring by half: 39–37, 33–22
Pts: J. James (16); Rebs: J. Fulkerson (6); Asts: Z. Zeigler (8)	Pts: S. Moore (15); Rebs: Tied (6); Asts: Tied (3)

Amalie Arena
Tampa, FL
Attendance: 17,132
Referees: Terry Oglesby, Steven Anderson, Bart Lenox

SECN

March 11
8:00 p.m.

No. 3 Kentucky 77, No. 11 Vanderbilt 71
Scoring by half: 37–33, 40–38
Pts: T. Washington Jr. (25); Rebs: O. Tshiebwe (14); Asts: S. Wheeler (11)	Pts: J. Wright (27); Rebs: Tied (6); Asts: S. Pippen Jr. (7)

Amalie Arena
Tampa, FL
Attendance: 17,132
Referees: Doug Shows, Byron Jarrett, Pat Adams

=== Semifinals ===
ESPN

March 12
1:00 p.m.

No. 8 Texas A&M 82, No. 4 Arkansas 64
Scoring by half: 36–24, 46–40
Pts: Q. Jackson (20); Rebs: Tied (5); Asts: Q. Jackson (6)	Pts: S. Umude (20); Rebs: J. Williams (9); Asts: J. Notae (5)

Amalie Arena
Tampa, FL
Referees: Don Daily, Terry Wymer, Bart Lenox

ESPN

March 12
3:00 p.m.

No. 2 Tennessee 69, No. 3 Kentucky 62
Scoring by half: 33–22, 36–40
Pts: K. Chandler (19); Rebs: U. Plavsic (8); Asts: Tied (3)	Pts: K. Brooks Jr. (19); Rebs: O. Tshiebwe (11); Asts: T. Washington Jr. (4)

Amalie Arena
Tampa, FL
Attendance: 20,670
Referees: Doug Shows, Chuck Jones, Pat Adams

=== Final ===
ESPN

March 13
1:00 p.m.

No. 8 Texas A&M 50, No. 2 Tennessee 65
Scoring by half: 20–29, 30–36
Pts: T. Radford (13); Rebs: H. Coleman III (7); Asts: Q. Jackson (3)	Pts: S. Vescovi (17); Rebs: J. Fulkerson (12); Asts: K. Chandler (7)

Amalie Arena
Tampa, FL
Attendance: 16,643
Referees: Joe Lindsay, Tony Greene, Terry Oglesby

== See also ==
- 2022 SEC women's basketball tournament
