= 2021–22 South Carolina Gamecocks men's basketball team =

American men's college basketball team

2021–22 South Carolina Gamecocks men's basketball
- Conference: Southeastern Conference
- Record: 18–13 (9–9 SEC)
- Head coach: Frank Martin (10th season)
- Associate head coach: Chuck Martin
- Assistant coaches: Will Bailey; Brian Steele
- Home arena: Colonial Life Arena

2021–22 Southeastern Conference men's basketball standings
	Conf.				Overall
Team	W		L	PCT	W		L	PCT
No. 14 Auburn	15	–	3	.833	28	–	6	.824
No. 16 Kentucky	14	–	4	.778	26	–	8	.765
No. 15 Tennessee †	14	–	4	.778	27	–	8	.771
No. 8 Arkansas	13	–	5	.722	28	–	9	.757
LSU	9	–	9	.500	22	–	12	.647
Alabama	9	–	9	.500	19	–	14	.576
South Carolina	9	–	9	.500	18	–	13	.581
Texas A&M	9	–	9	.500	27	–	13	.675
Florida	9	–	9	.500	20	–	14	.588
Mississippi State	8	–	10	.444	18	–	16	.529
Vanderbilt	7	–	11	.389	19	–	17	.528
Missouri	5	–	13	.278	12	–	21	.364
Ole Miss	4	–	14	.222	13	–	19	.406
Georgia	1	–	17	.056	6	–	26	.188
† 2022 SEC tournament winner Rankings from AP poll

The 2021–22 South Carolina Gamecocks men's basketball team represented the University of South Carolina during the 2021–22 NCAA Division I men's basketball season. The team was led by 10th-year head coach Frank Martin, and played their home games at Colonial Life Arena in Columbia, South Carolina as a member of the Southeastern Conference. They finished the season 18–13, 9–9 in SEC play to finish in a five-way tie for fifth place. As the No. 7 seed in the SEC tournament, they lost to Mississippi State in the second round.

On March 14, 2022, the school fired head coach Frank Martin. On March 24, the school named Chattanooga head coach Lamont Paris the team's new head coach.

== Previous season ==
In a season limited due to the ongoing COVID-19 pandemic, the Gamecocks finished the 2020–21 season 6–15, 4–12 in SEC play to finish in 12th place. As the No. 11 seed in the SEC tournament they lost in the first round to Ole Miss.

== Offseason ==
=== Departures ===
Name	Number	Pos.	Height	Weight	Year	Hometown	Reason for departure
A. J. Lawson	00	G	6'6"	177	Junior	Mississauga, ON	Declare for 2021 NBA draft
T. J. Moss	1	G	6'4"	175	RS Sophomore	Memphis, TN	Transferred to McNeese State
Trey Anderson	2	F	6'6"	205	Sophomore	San Diego, CA	Transferred to San Jose State
Jalyn McCreary	4	F	6'8"	235	Sophomore	Marietta, GA	Transferred to South Florida
Justin Minaya	10	F	6'6"	215	RS Junior	Harrington Park, NJ	Transferred to Providence
Trae Hannibal	12	G	6'3"	220	Sophomore	Hartsville, SC	Transferred to Murray State
Nathan Nelson	14	F	6'7"	201	Junior	Murfreesboro, TN	Walk-on; didn't return
Alanzo Frink	20	F	6'8"	264	Junior	Jersey City, NJ	Transferred to East Carolina
Seventh Woods	23	G	6'2"	184	RS Senior	Columbia, SC	Graduate transferred to Morgan State

=== Incoming transfers ===
Name	Number	Pos.	Height	Weight	Year	Hometown	Previous school
James Reese V	0	G	6'4"	170	Graduate Student	Eastover, SC	North Texas
Chico Carter Jr.	2	G	6'3"	189	Junior	Columbia, SC	Murray State
Erik Stevenson	10	G	6'4"	209	Senior	Lacey, WA	Washington
AJ Wilson	12	F	6’7”	234	Graduate Student	Laurel, MD	George Mason
Brandon Martin	14	F	6'5"	232	Senior	Miami, FL	USC Upstate
Josh Gray	33	C	7'0"	255	Sophomore	Brooklyn, NY	LSU

=== 2021 recruiting class ===
College recruiting
Name	Hometown	School	Height	Weight	Commit date
Devin Carter #22 SG	Miami, FL	Brewster Academy	6 ft 3 in (1.91 m)	180 lb (82 kg)	Apr 24, 2020
Devin Carter #22 SG	Recruit ratings: Scout: Rivals: 247Sports: ESPN: (82)				
Jacobi Wright #20 PG	Greenville, SC	Legacy Early College High School	6 ft 2 in (1.88 m)	180 lb (82 kg)	Jun 21, 2020
Jacobi Wright #20 PG	Recruit ratings: Scout: Rivals: 247Sports: ESPN: (81)				
TaQuan Woodley #29 C	Camden, NJ	Camden High School	6 ft 7 in (2.01 m)	220 lb (100 kg)	Nov 19, 2020
TaQuan Woodley #29 C	Recruit ratings: Scout: Rivals: 247Sports: ESPN: (78)				
Carlous Williams; SF	Gulfport, MS	Harrison Central High School	6 ft 5 in (1.96 m)	230 lb (100 kg)	Aug 26, 2020
Carlous Williams; SF	Recruit ratings: Scout: Rivals: 247Sports: ESPN: (NR)				
Overall recruit ranking:
Note: In many cases, Scout, Rivals, 247Sports, On3, and ESPN may conflict in their listings of height and weight.; In these cases, the average was taken. ESPN grades are on a 100-point scale.; Sources: "South Carolina 2021 Basketball Commitments". Rivals.; "2020 South Carolina Gamecocks Recruiting Class". ESPN.; "2021 Team Ranking". Rivals.

=== 2022 recruiting class ===
College recruiting (2022)
Name	Hometown	School	Height	Weight	Commit date
Zachary Davis; SF	Denmark, SC	Denmark-Olar High School	6 ft 7 in (2.01 m)	170 lb (77 kg)	Jun 21, 2021
Zachary Davis; SF	Recruit ratings: Scout: Rivals: 247Sports: ESPN: (NR)				
Overall recruit ranking:
Note: In many cases, Scout, Rivals, 247Sports, On3, and ESPN may conflict in their listings of height and weight.; In these cases, the average was taken. ESPN grades are on a 100-point scale.; Sources: "South Carolina 2022 Basketball Commitments". Rivals.; "2020 South Carolina Gamecocks Recruiting Class". ESPN.; "2022 Team Ranking". Rivals.

== Roster ==
2021–22 South Carolina Gamecocks men's basketball team
Players
Coaches

Pos.	#	Name	Height	Weight	Year	Previous school	Hometown
G	0	James Reese V	6 ft 4 in (1.93 m)	170 lb (77 kg)	GS	AC Flora HS; North Texas	Eastover, SC
G	1	Jacobi Wright	6 ft 2 in (1.88 m)	180 lb (82 kg)	Fr	Legacy Early College	Fort Mill, SC
G	2	Chico Carter Jr.	6 ft 3 in (1.91 m)	189 lb (86 kg)	Jr	Cardinal Newman HS; Murray State	Columbia, SC
C	4	Tre-Vaughn Minott	6 ft 9 in (2.06 m)	270 lb (122 kg)	So	NBA Academy Latin America	Montreal, QC
G	5	Jermaine Couisnard	6 ft 4 in (1.93 m)	211 lb (96 kg)	RS Jr	Montverde Academy	East Chicago, IN
G	10	Erik Stevenson	6 ft 4 in (1.93 m)	209 lb (95 kg)	Sr	Timberline HS; Washington	Lacey, WA
F	12	AJ Wilson	6 ft 7 in (2.01 m)	234 lb (106 kg)	GS	Elev8 Prep Academy; George Mason	Laurel, MD
G	13	Mike Green (W)	6 ft 2 in (1.88 m)	190 lb (86 kg)	Jr	Christian Academy of Myrtle Beach	Myrtle Beach, SC
F	14	Brandon Martin	6 ft 5 in (1.96 m)	232 lb (105 kg)	Sr	Cardinal Newman HS; USC Upstate	Miami, FL
F/C	15	Wildens Leveque	6 ft 10 in (2.08 m)	255 lb (116 kg)	Jr	Gould Academy	Brocton, MA
F	21	Ja'Von Benson	6 ft 7 in (2.01 m)	250 lb (113 kg)	So	Ridge View HS	Columbia, SC
G	23	Devin Carter	6 ft 3 in (1.91 m)	188 lb (85 kg)	Fr	Brewster Academy	Miami, FL
F	24	Keyshawn Bryant	6 ft 6 in (1.98 m)	187 lb (85 kg)	Sr	Winter Haven HS	Winter Haven, FL
C	33	Josh Gray	7 ft 0 in (2.13 m)	255 lb (116 kg)	So	Putnam Science Academy; LSU	Brooklyn, NY
G	44	Ford Cooper Jr. (W)	6 ft 3 in (1.91 m)	202 lb (92 kg)	Jr	United Faith Christian Academy; Missouri State	Charlotte, NC
F	55	Ta'Quan Woodley	6 ft 8 in (2.03 m)	280 lb (127 kg)	Fr	Caden HS	Camden, NJ

Head coach

- Frank Martin (FIU)

Assistant coach(es)

- Chuck Martin (Monmouth)
- Will Bailey (UAB)
- Brian Steele (South Carolina)

Legend

- (C) Team captain
- (S) Suspended
- (I) Ineligible
- (W) Walk-on
- Injured
- Current redshirt

Roster

== Schedule and results ==
Date time, TV	Rank^{#}	Opponent^{#}	Result	Record	High points	High rebounds	High assists	Site (attendance) city, state
Exhibition
November 4, 2021*; 7:00 p.m.		Benedict	W 101–76	0–0	21 – Reese V	12 – Gray	6 – Wright	Colonial Life Arena; Columbia, SC
Non-conference regular season
November 9, 2021*; 7:00 p.m., SECN+		USC Upstate	W 78–60	1–0	14 – Tied	8 – Tied	7 – Couisnard	Colonial Life Arena (10,092); Columbia, SC
November 12, 2021*; 9:00 p.m., ESPNews		vs. Princeton; Asheville Championship semifinals	L 62–66	1–1	17 – Couisnard	10 – Leveque	5 – Stevenson	Harrah's Cherokee Center; Asheville, NC
November 14, 2021*; 5:00 p.m., ESPNU		vs. Western Kentucky; Asheville Championship Consolation	W 75–64	2–1	16 – Tied	11 – Leveque	4 – D. Carter	Harrah's Cherokee Center; Asheville, NC
November 18, 2021*; 7:00 p.m., SECN+		UAB	W 66–63	3–1	15 – Stevenson	8 – Martin	3 – 3 tied	Colonial Life Arena (8,856); Columbia, SC
November 23, 2021*; 7:00 p.m., SECN+		Wofford	W 85–74	4–1	25 – Stevenson	6 – Stevenson	4 – Reese V	Colonial Life Arena (8,411); Columbia, SC
November 28, 2021*; 2:00 p.m., SECN+		Rider	W 65–58	5–1	17 – Bryant	6 – Leveque	4 – Wright	Colonial Life Arena (8,027); Columbia, SC
December 1, 2021*; 7:00 p.m., ESPN+		at Coastal Carolina	L 56–80	5–2	12 – Stevenson	8 – Wilson	2 – Tied	HTC Center (2,924); Conway, SC
December 5, 2021*; 2:00 p.m., SECN		Georgetown	W 80–67	6–2	14 – Leveque	8 – Bryant	6 – Wright	Colonial Life Arena (9,207); Columbia, SC
December 12, 2021*; 12:00 p.m., ESPN2		vs. Florida State; No Room for Racism Classic	W 66–65	7–2	16 – D. Carter	7 – D. Carter	4 – Stevenson	Rock Hill Sports & Event Center (1,523); Rock Hill, SC
December 14, 2021*; 7:00 p.m., SECN+		Allen	W 110–51	8–2	12 – Tied	11 – Martin	6 – Tied	Colonial Life Arena (7,872); Columbia, SC
December 18, 2021*; 8:00 p.m., ACCN		at Clemson; Rivalry	L 56–70	8–3	21 – Carter Jr.	7 – Stevenson	1 – 4 Tied	Littlejohn Coliseum (6,677); Clemson, SC
December 22, 2021*; 3:00 p.m., SECN+		Army	W 105–75	9–3	22 – Carter Jr.	6 – Tied	5 – Stevenson	Colonial Life Arena (9,181); Columbia, SC
December 29, 2021*; 3:00 p.m., SECN+		South Carolina State	Postponed due to COVID-19 protocols					Colonial Life Arena; Columbia, SC
SEC regular season
January 4, 2022; 6:30 p.m., SECN		No. 9 Auburn	L 66–81	9–4 (0–1)	25 – Stevenson	7 – Tied	4 – Stevenson	Colonial Life Arena (8,528); Columbia, SC
January 8, 2022; 12:00 p.m., ESPNU		at Vanderbilt	W 72–70	10–4 (1–1)	13 – Reese V	6 – Stevenson	4 – Couisnard	Memorial Gymnasium (5,581); Nashville, TN
January 11, 2022; 6:30 p.m., SECN		at No. 22 Tennessee	L 46–66	10–5 (1–2)	15 – Reese V	6 – Stevenson	3 – Wright	Thompson–Boling Arena (15,282); Knoxville, TN
January 15, 2022; 1:00 p.m., SECN		Florida	L 63–71	10–6 (1–3)	12 – Carter Jr.	8 – Bryant	2 – 3 Tied	Colonial Life Arena (10,813); Columbia, SC
January 18, 2022; 7:00 p.m., SECN		at Arkansas	L 59–75	10–7 (1–4)	20 – D. Carter	11 – Gray	3 – Tied	Bud Walton Arena (19,200); Fayetteville, AR
January 22, 2022; 3:30 p.m., SECN		Georgia	W 83–66	11–7 (2–4)	20 – Stevenson	7 – Leveque	4 – Tied	Colonial Life Arena (10,478); Columbia, SC
January 26, 2022; 7:00 p.m., ESPNU		Vanderbilt	W 70–61	12–7 (3–4)	19 – Reese	6 – Gray	4 – 3 tied	Colonial Life Arena (8,768); Columbia, SC
January 29, 2022; 8:30 p.m., SECN		at Texas A&M	W 74–63	13–7 (4–4)	20 – Reese	7 – Bryant	6 – Cousinard	Reed Arena (9,079); College Station, TX
February 1, 2022; 7:00 p.m., ESPNU		at Mississippi State	L 64–78	13–8 (4–5)	15 – Reese	4 – Wilson	3 – Reese	Humphrey Coliseum (6,678); Starkville, MS
February 5, 2022; 1:00 p.m., CBS		No. 22 Tennessee	L 57–81	13–9 (4–6)	13 – Tied	5 – Tied	4 – Stevenson	Colonial Life Arena (12,391); Columbia, SC
February 8, 2022; 7:00 p.m., ESPN		No. 5 Kentucky	L 76–86	13–10 (4–7)	18 – Bryant	14 – Bryant	6 – Carter	Colonial Life Arena (12,009); Columbia, SC
February 12, 2022; 1:00 p.m., SECN		at Georgia	W 80–68	14–10 (5–7)	22 – Bryant	8 – Leveque	7 – Couisnard	Stegeman Coliseum (6,806); Athens, GA
February 15, 2022; 7:00 p.m., ESPNU		at Ole Miss	W 77–74 ^{OT}	15–10 (6–7)	17 – Stevenson	11 – Carter	4 – Carter	SJB Pavilion (5,813); Oxford, MS
February 19, 2022; 3:30 p.m., SECN		LSU	W 77–75	16–10 (7–7)	33 – Couisnard	8 – Bryant	4 – Stevenson	Colonial Life Arena (11,292); Columbia, SC
February 23, 2022; 6:30 p.m., SECN		Mississippi State	W 66–56	17–10 (8–7)	22 – Couisnard	7 – Martin	5 – D. Carter	Colonial Life Arena (10,129); Columbia, SC
February 26, 2022; 6:00 p.m., SECN		at No. 24 Alabama	L 71–90	17–11 (8–8)	17 – Stevenson	5 – Stevenson	6 – Stevenson	Coleman Coliseum (11,195); Tuscaloosa, AL
March 1, 2022; 7:00 p.m., ESPNU		Missouri	W 73–69	18–11 (9–8)	17 – Carter	8 – Carter	7 – Couisnard	Colonial Life Arena (9,479); Columbia, SC
March 5, 2022; 1:00 p.m., SECN		at No. 5 Auburn	L 71–82	18–12 (9–9)	22 – Couisnard	8 – Tied	4 – Tied	Neville Arena (9,121); Auburn, AL
SEC tournament
March 10, 2022; 6:00 p.m., SECN	(7)	vs. (10) Mississippi State; Second round	L 51–73	18–13	18 – Stevenson	6 – Leveque	5 – Stevenson	Amalie Arena; Tampa, FL
*Non-conference game. ^{#}Rankings from AP Poll. (#) Tournament seedings in parentheses. All times are in Eastern Time.

== See also ==
- 2021–22 South Carolina Gamecocks women's basketball team
