= 2021 Diamond Head Classic =

College basketball competition

- Season: 2021–22
- Teams: 8
- Finals site: Stan Sheriff Center; Honolulu, Hawaii
- Champions: Vanderbit (1st title)
- Runner-up: Stanford (1st title game)
- Semifinalists: Liberty (1st semifinal); BYU (1st semifinal)
- Winning coach: Jerry Stackhouse (1st title)
- MVP: Darius McGhee (Liberty)

The 2021 Diamond Head Classic was a mid-season eight-team college basketball tournament that was played on December 22, 23, and 25 at the Stan Sheriff Center in Honolulu, Hawaii. It was the 12th annual Diamond Head Classic tournament, and was part of the 2021–22 NCAA Division I men's basketball season. The 2021 field was announced in May, and featured BYU, Hawai’i, Liberty, Northern Iowa, South Florida, Stanford, Vanderbilt and Wyoming.

The championship final between Stanford and Vanderbilt was canceled because of COVID-19 issues in the Cardinal camp.

== Bracket ==
* – Denotes overtime period

5th place game December 25
Wyoming	77
South Florida	57
7th place game
Northern Iowa*	NA
Hawai’i*	NA

Consolation 2nd Round; December 23
Northern Iowa	69
Wyoming	71
South Florida	76
Hawai’i	69

First Round; December 22
Liberty	76
Northern Iowa	74
Wyoming	63
Stanford	66
BYU	54
South Florida	39
Vanderbilt	68
Hawai’i	54

Semifinals; December 23
Liberty	76
Stanford	79
BYU	67
Vanderbilt	69

Championship; December 25
Stanford*	NA
Vanderbilt*	NA
3rd place game
Liberty	75
BYU	80

Notes: All games played at the Stan Sheriff Center in Honolulu, Hawaii. * Northern Iowa vs Hawai’i was canceled due to Covid issues. * Stanford vs Vanderbilt was canceled due to Covid issues.
