= 2021–22 Memphis Tigers men's basketball team =

American college basketball season

2021–22 Memphis Tigers men's basketball

NCAA tournament, Second Round
- Conference: American Athletic Conference
- Record: 22–11 (13–5 AAC)
- Head coach: Penny Hardaway (4th season)
- Assistant coaches: Larry Brown; Cody Toppert
- Home arena: FedExForum (Capacity: 18,119)

2021–22 American Athletic Conference men's basketball standings
	Conf.				Overall
Team	W		L	PCT	W		L	PCT
No. 15 Houston †	15	–	3	.833	32	–	6	.842
SMU	13	–	4	.765	24	–	9	.727
Memphis	13	–	5	.722	22	–	11	.667
Temple	10	–	7	.588	17	–	12	.586
Tulane	10	–	8	.556	14	–	15	.483
UCF	9	–	9	.500	18	–	12	.600
Wichita State	6	–	9	.400	15	–	13	.536
Cincinnati	7	–	11	.389	18	–	15	.545
East Carolina	6	–	11	.353	15	–	15	.500
Tulsa	4	–	14	.222	11	–	20	.355
South Florida	3	–	15	.167	8	–	23	.258
† 2022 AAC tournament winner Rankings from AP poll

The 2021–22 Memphis Tigers men's basketball team represented the University of Memphis in the 2021–22 NCAA Division I men's basketball season. The Tigers were led by fourth-year head coach Penny Hardaway. The team played their home games at FedExForum as members of the American Athletic Conference. They finished the season 22–11, 13–5 in AAC Play to finish in 3rd place. They defeated UCF and SMU to advance to the championship game of the AAC tournament where they lost to Houston. They received an at-large bid to the NCAA tournament as the No. 9 seed in the West Region, where they defeated Boise State in the First Round before losing in the Second Round to Gonzaga.

== Previous season ==
The Tigers finished the 2020–21 season 20–8, 11–4 in AAC play, finishing in third place. They entered as the No. 3 seed in the AAC tournament, where they would lose to No. 2 seed Houston in the semifinals. They were selected as a No. 1 seed in the NIT. The Tigers would go on to win the tournament, their second overall, and first since 2002.

== Offseason ==
On June 11, 2021, speculation emerged that Penny Hardaway was a candidate for multiple head coaching jobs in the NBA including his former team, the Orlando Magic. On June 28, reports emerged that Hardaway had in fact interviewed and emerged as a top candidate for the vacant head coaching job. Two days later, via Instagram, Hardaway confirmed he was not leaving the University of Memphis, and reports emerged that Hall of Fame coach Larry Brown had accepted an offer to be his assistant.

=== Departing players ===
Name	Number	Pos.	Height	Weight	Year	Hometown	Notes
D. J. Jeffries	0	F	6'7"	215	Sophomore	Olive Branch, MS	Transferred to Mississippi State
Isaiah Stokes	4	F	6'8"	250	RS Sophomore	Memphis, TN	Dismissed from team
Boogie Ellis	5	G	6'3"	180	Sophomore	San Diego, CA	Transferred to USC
Damion Baugh	10	G	6'3"	185	Sophomore	Nashville, TN	Transferred to TCU
Jordan Nesbitt	14	G	6'6"	185	Freshman	St. Louis, MO	Transferred to Saint Louis
Lance Thomas	15	F	6'9"	224	Junior	Norcross, GA	Transferred to South Alabama (mid-season)
Ahmad Rand	20	F	6'8"	180	Junior	Lincolnton, GA	Transferred to Oregon State (mid-season)
Moussa Cissé	32	C	6'10"	220	Freshman	Conakry, Guinea	Transferred to Oklahoma State

=== Incoming transfers ===
Name	Number	Pos.	Height	Weight	Year	Hometown	Notes
Earl Timberlake	0	G	6'6"	220	Sophomore	Washington, D.C.	Transferred from Miami (Florida). Timberlake will have four years of remaining eligibility.
Chandler Lawson	4	F	6'7"	215	Junior	Memphis, TN	Transferred from Oregon. Lawson will have three years of remaining eligibility.
Tyler Harris	14	G	5'9"	148	Senior	Memphis, TN	Walk–on; transferred from Iowa State. Harris will have two years of remaining eligibility.

=== 2021 recruiting class ===
College recruiting information
Name	Hometown	School	Height	Weight	Commit date
Emoni Bates*; SF	Ypsilanti, Michigan	Ypsi Prep Academy	6 ft 9 in (2.06 m)	200 lb (91 kg)	August 25, 2021
Emoni Bates*; SF	Recruit ratings: Rivals: 247Sports: ESPN: (98)				
Jalen Duren*; C	New Castle, Delaware	Montverde Academy (FL)	6 ft 10 in (2.08 m)	230 lb (100 kg)	8/6/21
Jalen Duren*; C	Recruit ratings: Rivals: 247Sports: ESPN: (97)				
Josh Minott; SF	Boca Raton, Florida	Saint Andrew's School	6 ft 8 in (2.03 m)	175 lb (79 kg)	08/08/20
Josh Minott; SF	Recruit ratings: Rivals: 247Sports: ESPN: (84)				
Johnathan Lawson; SF	Memphis, Tennessee	Wooddale High School	6 ft 6 in (1.98 m)	165 lb (75 kg)	4/22/21
Johnathan Lawson; SF	Recruit ratings: Rivals: 247Sports: ESPN: (84)				
Sam Onu; C	Malvern, Pennsylvania	The Phelps School	6 ft 11 in (2.11 m)	235 lb (107 kg)	10/13/20
Sam Onu; C	Recruit ratings: Rivals: 247Sports: ESPN: (81)				
John Camden; SF	Downingtown, Pennsylvania	Brewster Academy	6 ft 7 in (2.01 m)	195 lb (88 kg)	09/30/20
John Camden; SF	Recruit ratings: Rivals: 247Sports: ESPN: (79)				
Overall recruit ranking: Rivals: 1 247Sports: 1
Note: In many cases, Scout, Rivals, 247Sports, On3, and ESPN may conflict in their listings of height and weight.; In these cases, the average was taken. ESPN grades are on a 100-point scale.; Sources: "Memphis 2021 Basketball Commitments". Rivals.; "2021 Memphis Tigers Recruiting Class". ESPN.; "2021 Team Ranking". Rivals.; "2021 Memphis Tigers Basketball 24/7 Sports Commits". 247Sports.

*Originally class of 2022, but reclassified to 2021.

== Preseason ==
=== AAC preseason media poll ===
On October 13, The American released the preseason Poll and other preseason awards

Coaches Poll
Predicted finish	Team	Votes (1st place)
1	Houston	98 (8)
2	Memphis	92 (3)
3	SMU	77
4	Wichita State	76
5	UCF	66
6	Cincinnati	52
7	Tulsa	43
8	Temple	37
T-9	South Florida	25
T-9	Tulane	25
11	East Carolina	14

=== Preseason Awards ===
- AAC Preseason Rookie of the Year - Jalen Duren
- AAC Preseason All-Conference First Team - Jalen Duren
- AAC Preseason All-Conference First Team - Landers Nolley II
- AAC Preseason All-Conference Second Team - Emoni Bates
- AAC Preseason All-Conference Second Team - DeAndre Williams

== Roster ==
2021–22 Memphis Tigers men's basketball team
Players
Coaches

Pos.	#	Name	Height	Weight	Year	Previous school	Hometown
G	0	Earl Timberlake	6 ft 6 in (1.98 m)	220 lb (100 kg)	So	Miami (FL)	Washington, D.C.
F	1	Emoni Bates	6 ft 9 in (2.06 m)	190 lb (86 kg)	Fr	Ypsi Prep Academy	Ypsilanti, MI
C	2	Jalen Duren	6 ft 11 in (2.11 m)	250 lb (113 kg)	Fr	Montverde Academy (FL)	New Castle, DE
G	3	Landers Nolley II	6 ft 7 in (2.01 m)	208 lb (94 kg)	RS Jr	Virginia Tech	Fairburn, GA
F	4	Chandler Lawson	6 ft 7 in (2.01 m)	215 lb (98 kg)	Jr	Oregon	Memphis, TN
G	5	Johnathan Lawson	6 ft 6 in (1.98 m)	185 lb (84 kg)	Fr	Wooddale HS	Memphis, TN
G	10	Alex Lomax	6 ft 0 in (1.83 m)	188 lb (85 kg)	Sr	East HS	Memphis, TN
G	11	Lester Quiñones	6 ft 5 in (1.96 m)	208 lb (94 kg)	Jr	IMG Academy	Brentwood, NY
F	12	DeAndre Williams	6 ft 9 in (2.06 m)	205 lb (93 kg)	Sr	Evansville	Houston, TX
G	14	Tyler Harris (W)	5 ft 9 in (1.75 m)	148 lb (67 kg)	Sr	Iowa State	Memphis, TN
F	15	John Camden	6 ft 8 in (2.03 m)	208 lb (94 kg)	Fr	Brewster Academy	Downingtown, PA
F	20	Josh Minott	6 ft 8 in (2.03 m)	205 lb (93 kg)	Fr	Saint Andrew's School	Boca Raton, FL
C	23	Malcolm Dandridge	6 ft 9 in (2.06 m)	250 lb (113 kg)	Jr	East HS	Memphis, TN
G	25	Jayden Hardaway (W)	6 ft 5 in (1.96 m)	209 lb (95 kg)	RS Jr	IMG Academy	Memphis, TN
G	30	Conor Glennon (W)	5 ft 10 in (1.78 m)	172 lb (78 kg)	So	Brother Rice HS	Chicago, IL
G	31	Tadarius Jacobs (W)	6 ft 1 in (1.85 m)	170 lb (77 kg)	Fr	Bartlett HS	Memphis, TN
C	55	Sam Onu	6 ft 11 in (2.11 m)	270 lb (122 kg)	Fr	The Phelps School	Malvern, PA

Head coach

- Penny Hardaway (Memphis)

Assistant coach(es)

- Larry Brown (North Carolina)
- Cody Toppert (Cornell)

Legend

- (C) Team captain
- (S) Suspended
- (I) Ineligible
- (W) Walk-on
- (T) Transferred
- Injured
- Current redshirt

Roster
Last update: August 25, 2021

== Schedule and results ==
Date time, TV	Rank^{#}	Opponent^{#}	Result	Record	High points	High rebounds	High assists	Site (attendance) city, state
Exhibition
October 24, 2021*; 4:00 p.m.	No. 12	LeMoyne–Owen	W 105–57	–	20 – Quiñones	7 – Timberlake	7 – Tied	FedExForum (10,925); Memphis, TN
October 31, 2021*; 1:00 p.m.	No. 12	Lane	W 88–49	–	18 – Nolley II	6 – Duren	4 – Nolley II	FedExForum (10,741); Memphis, TN
Non-conference regular season
November 9, 2021*; 7:00 p.m., ESPN+	No. 12	Tennessee Tech	W 89–65	1–0	17 – Bates	7 – Quiñones	4 – Tied	FedExForum (12,928); Memphis, TN
November 13, 2021*; 6:00 p.m., ESPN+	No. 12	North Carolina Central	W 90–51	2–0	15 – Bates	10 – Duren	6 – Timberlake	FedExForum (12,893); Memphis, TN
November 16, 2021*; 7:00 p.m., ESPN+	No. 11	Saint Louis	W 90–74	3–0	18 – Harris	10 – Nolley II	4 – Tied	FedExForum (13,302); Memphis, TN
November 19, 2021*; 7:00 p.m., ESPN+	No. 11	Western Kentucky	W 74–62	4–0	22 – Duren	19 – Duren	4 – Lomax	FedExForum (13,375); Memphis, TN
November 24, 2021*; 8:30 p.m., ESPN2	No. 9	vs. Virginia Tech; NIT Season Tip-Off semifinal	W 69–61	5–0	16 – Williams	10 – Williams	3 – Nolley II	Barclays Center (2,804); Brooklyn, NY
November 26, 2021*; 8:30 p.m., ESPN2	No. 9	vs. Iowa State; NIT Season Tip-Off championship	L 59–78	5–1	12 – Bates	6 – Tied	3 – Lomax	Barclays Center (2,655); Brooklyn, NY
December 1, 2021*; 6:15 p.m., SECN	No. 18	at Georgia; American/SEC Alliance	L 79–82	5–2	17 – Nolley II	8 – Williams	5 – Quiñones	Stegeman Coliseum (8,629); Athens, GA
December 4, 2021*; 11:00 a.m., ESPN2	No. 18	at Ole Miss	L 63–67	5–3	13 – Williams	5 – Timberlake	3 – Nolley II	SJB Pavilion (8,629); Oxford, MS
December 10, 2021*; 7:00 p.m., ESPN+		Murray State	L 72–74	5–4	15 – Harris	5 – Tied	4 – Harris	FedExForum (13,607); Memphis, TN
December 14, 2021*; 8:00 p.m., ESPN2		No. 6 Alabama	W 92–78	6–4	20 – Williams	6 – Duren	6 – Tied	FedExForum (15,266); Memphis, TN
December 18, 2021*; 11:00 a.m., ESPN2		vs. No. 18 Tennessee; Nashville Showcase	Canceled due to COVID-19 issues within Memphis program					Bridgestone Arena (–); Nashville, TN
December 21, 2021*; 7:00 p.m., ESPN+		Alabama State	Canceled due to COVID-19 issues within Memphis program					FedExForum (–); Memphis, TN
AAC regular season
December 29, 2021; 7:00 p.m., ESPN+		at Tulane	L 84–85	6–5 (0–1)	19 – Nolley II	8 – Timberlake	6 – Timberlake	Devlin Fieldhouse (1,705); New Orleans, LA
January 1, 2022; 11:00 a.m., CBS		at Wichita State	W 82–64	7–5 (1–1)	15 – Minott	7 – Williams	4 – Williams	Charles Koch Arena (8,751); Wichita, KS
January 4, 2022; 8:00 p.m., ESPNU		Tulsa	W 67–64	8–5 (2–1)	12 – Tied	11 – Minott	5 – Minott	FedExForum (12,863); Memphis, TN
January 9, 2022; 2:30 p.m., ABC		Cincinnati; Rivalry	W 87–80	9–5 (3–1)	20 – Harris	10 – Minott	6 – Bates	FedExForum (14,502); Memphis, TN
January 12, 2022; 6:00 p.m., ESPN+		at UCF	L 64–74	9–6 (3–2)	15 – Harris	7 – Bates	6 – Nolley II	Addition Financial Arena (6,163); Orlando, FL
January 15, 2022; 3:00 p.m., ESPN+		at East Carolina	L 71–72	9–7 (3–3)	15 – Duren	9 – Duren	7 – Harris	Williams Arena (5,107); Greenville, NC
January 20, 2022; 6:00 p.m., ESPN2		SMU	L 62–70	9–8 (3–4)	17 – Harris	9 – Duren	5 – Lomax	FedExForum (13,723); Memphis, TN
January 23, 2022; 2:00 p.m., ESPN		at Tulsa	W 83–81	10–8 (4–4)	24 – Harris	9 – Minott	7 – Lomax	Reynolds Center (3,524); Tulsa, OK
January 27, 2022; 8:00 p.m., ESPN2		East Carolina	W 71–54	11–8 (5–4)	17 – Quinones	12 – Minott	5 – Timberlake	FedExForum (13,418); Memphis, TN
February 5, 2022; 7:00 p.m., ESPN2		UCF	W 88–60	12–8 (6–4)	16 – Minott	10 – Duren	5 – Harris	FedExForum (15,280); Memphis, TN
February 9, 2022; 7:00 p.m., ESPN+		Tulane	W 80–69	13–8 (7–4)	15 – Duren	13 – Williams	5 – Lomax	FedExForum (13,685); Memphis, TN
February 12, 2022; 2:30 p.m., ABC		at No. 6 Houston	W 69–59	14–8 (8–4)	20 – Nolley II	11 – Duren	6 – Lomax	Fertitta Center (7,450); Houston, TX
February 15, 2022; 6:00 p.m., ESPN+		at Cincinnati; Previously scheduled for Feb. 3rd	W 81–74	15–8 (9–4)	15 – Harris	8 – Williams	9 – Lomax	Fifth Third Arena; Cincinnati, OH
February 20, 2022; 2:00 p.m., ESPN		at SMU	L 57–73	15–9 (9–5)	13 – Quinones	7 – Williams	5 – Lomax	Moody Coliseum (5,657); University Park, TX
February 24, 2022; 6:00 p.m., ESPN2		Temple	W 78–64	16–9 (10–5)	22 – Duren	9 – Williams	6 – Lomax	FedExForum (14,013); Memphis, TN
February 27, 2022; 1:30 p.m., ESPN		Wichita State	W 81–57	17–9 (11–5)	22 – Nolley II	7 – Duren	4 – Lomax	FedExForum (14,147); Memphis, TN
March 3, 2022; 8:00 p.m., ESPNU		at South Florida	W 73–64	18–9 (12–5)	16 – Duren	10 – Duren	5 – Nolley II	Yuengling Center (3,186); Tampa, FL
March 6, 2022; 11:00 a.m., CBS		No. 14 Houston	W 75–61	19–9 (13–5)	15 – Harris	8 – Duren	3 – Nolley II	FedExForum (17,946); Memphis, TN
AAC Tournament
March 11, 2022; 8:00 p.m., ESPNU	(3)	vs. (6) UCF; Quarterfinals	W 85–69	20–9	22 – Quinones	20 – Duren	7 – Lomax	Dickies Arena; Fort Worth, TX
March 12, 2022; 4:36 p.m., ESPN2	(3)	vs. (2) SMU; Semifinals	W 70–63	21–9	12 – Tied	10 – Williams	3 – Tied	Dickies Arena; Fort Worth, TX
March 13, 2022; 2:15 p.m., ESPN	(3)	vs. (1) No. 18 Houston; Championship	L 53–71	21–10	14 – Duren	10 – Duren	4 – Tied	Dickies Arena; Fort Worth, TX
NCAA tournament
March 17, 2022*; 12:45 p.m., TNT	(9 W)	vs. (8 W) No. 23 Boise State; First Round	W 64–53	22–10	14 – Williams	11 – Duren	5 – Lomax	Moda Center; Portland, OR
March 19, 2022*; 8:40 p.m., TBS	(9 W)	vs. (1 W) No. 1 Gonzaga; Second Round	L 78–82	22–11	14 – Williams	7 – Tied	5 – Lomax	Moda Center (17,907); Portland, OR
*Non-conference game. ^{#}Rankings from AP Poll. (#) Tournament seedings in parentheses. W=West. All times are in Central Time.

== Awards and honors ==
=== American Athletic Conference honors ===
==== All-AAC Awards ====
- Freshman of the Year: Jalen Duren

==== All-AAC First Team ====
- Jalen Duren

==== All-AAC Second Team ====
- DeAndre Williams

==== All-AAC Freshman Team ====
- Jalen Duren
- Josh Minott

== Rankings ==
Ranking movements Legend: ██ Increase in ranking ██ Decrease in ranking — = Not ranked RV = Received votes
	Week																				
Poll	Pre	1	2	3	4	5	6	7	8	9	10	11	12	13	14	15	16	17	18	19	Final
AP	12	11	9	18	RV	—	RV	RV	—	—	—	—	—	—	—	—	—	RV			Not released
Coaches	16	16^	10	19	RV	—	—	—	—	—	—	—	—	—	—	—	—	RV			

*AP does not release post-NCAA Tournament rankings
^Coaches did not release a week 1 poll.
