= 2021–22 Auburn Tigers men's basketball team =

American college basketball season

2021–22 Auburn Tigers men's basketball

SEC regular season champions

NCAA tournament, Second Round
- Conference: Southeastern Conference

Ranking
- Coaches: No. 14
- AP: No. 8
- Record: 28–6 (15–3 SEC)
- Head coach: Bruce Pearl (8th season)
- Assistant coaches: Ira Bowman (4th season); Wes Flanigan (4th season); Steven Pearl (5th season)
- Home arena: Neville Arena (Note: Auburn Arena was renamed Neville Arena on March 4, 2022.)

2021–22 Southeastern Conference men's basketball standings
	Conf.				Overall
Team	W		L	PCT	W		L	PCT
No. 14 Auburn	15	–	3	.833	28	–	6	.824
No. 16 Kentucky	14	–	4	.778	26	–	8	.765
No. 15 Tennessee †	14	–	4	.778	27	–	8	.771
No. 8 Arkansas	13	–	5	.722	28	–	9	.757
LSU	9	–	9	.500	22	–	12	.647
Alabama	9	–	9	.500	19	–	14	.576
South Carolina	9	–	9	.500	18	–	13	.581
Texas A&M	9	–	9	.500	27	–	13	.675
Florida	9	–	9	.500	20	–	14	.588
Mississippi State	8	–	10	.444	18	–	16	.529
Vanderbilt	7	–	11	.389	19	–	17	.528
Missouri	5	–	13	.278	12	–	21	.364
Ole Miss	4	–	14	.222	13	–	19	.406
Georgia	1	–	17	.056	6	–	26	.188
† 2022 SEC tournament winner Rankings from AP poll

The 2021–22 Auburn Tigers men's basketball team represented Auburn University during the 2021–22 NCAA Division I men's basketball season as a member of the Southeastern Conference. The team's head coach was Bruce Pearl in his eighth season at Auburn. The team played their home games at Neville Arena in Auburn, Alabama. They finished the season 28–6, 15–3 in SEC play to finish as regular season champions. As the No. 1 seed, they were defeated by No. 8 seed Texas A&M in the quarterfinals. They received an at-large bid to the NCAA tournament as the No. 2 seed in the Midwest Region, where they defeated Jacksonville State in the First Round before being upset by Miami in the Second Round.

On January 24, 2022, the team was voted first in the AP poll for the first time in program history, in the midst of a nineteen-game winning streak.

== Previous season ==
The 2020–21 Auburn Tigers men's basketball team finished the 2020–21 season 13–14, 7–11 in SEC play. Due to a self-imposed postseason ban following former assistant coach Chuck Person's involvement in the 2017–18 NCAA Division I men's basketball corruption scandal, the Tigers were ineligible to compete in the SEC tournament and the NCAA tournament.

== Offseason ==
=== Departures ===
Auburn lost five players from the 2020–21 team. Freshmen Sharife Cooper and JT Thor were selected in the NBA draft, and Javon Franklin, Jamal Johnson, and Justin Powell transferred.

Name	Number	Pos.	Height	Weight	Year	Hometown	Notes
Jamal Johnson	1	G	6'4"	195	Junior	Birmingham, AL	Transferred to UAB
Sharife Cooper	2	G	6'1"	180	Freshman	Powder Springs, GA	Declared for NBA draft; selected 48th overall by the Atlanta Hawks.
Javon Franklin	4	F	6'7"	220	Junior	Little Rock, AR	Transferred to South Alabama
JT Thor	10	F	6'10"	205	Freshman	Anchorage, AK	Declared for NBA draft; selected 37th overall by the Charlotte Hornets.
Justin Powell	24	F	6'6"	205	Freshman	Prospect, KY	Transferred to Tennessee

=== Incoming transfers ===
Name	Number	Pos.	Height	Weight	Year	Hometown	Previous School
K. D. Johnson	0	G	6'0"	204	Sophomore	Atlanta, GA	Transferred from Georgia
Wendell Green Jr.	1	G	5'11"	175	Sophomore	Detroit, MI	Transferred from Eastern Kentucky
Zep Jasper	12	G	6'1"	185	Senior	Augusta, GA	Transferred from College of Charleston
Walker Kessler	13	F/C	7'1"	245	Sophomore	Newnan, GA	Transferred from North Carolina

=== 2021 recruiting class ===
College recruiting information
Name	Hometown	School	Height	Weight	Commit date
Jabari Smith Jr. PF	Fayetteville, GA	Sandy Creek (GA)	6 ft 10 in (2.08 m)	210 lb (95 kg)	Oct 9, 2020
Jabari Smith Jr. PF	Recruit ratings: Rivals: 247Sports: ESPN: (96)				

== Roster ==
2021–22 Auburn Tigers men's basketball team
Players
Coaches

Pos.	#	Name	Height	Weight	Year	Previous school	Hometown
G	0	K. D. Johnson	6 ft 0 in (1.83 m)	204 lb (93 kg)	So	Hargrave Military/Georgia	Atlanta, GA
G	1	Wendell Green Jr.	5 ft 11 in (1.8 m)	175 lb (79 kg)	So	La Lumiere School/Eastern Kentucky	Detroit, MI
F	2	Jaylin Williams	6 ft 8 in (2.03 m)	230 lb (104 kg)	Jr	Brantley County	Nahunta, GA
F	5	Chris Moore	6 ft 6 in (1.98 m)	240 lb (109 kg)	So	West Memphis	West Memphis, AR
F	10	Jabari Smith Jr.	6 ft 10 in (2.08 m)	220 lb (100 kg)	Fr	Sandy Creek	Fayetteville, GA
G	12	Zep Jasper	6 ft 1 in (1.85 m)	185 lb (84 kg)	Sr	Laney High School/College of Charleston	Augusta, GA
C	13	Walker Kessler	7 ft 1 in (2.16 m)	245 lb (111 kg)	So	Woodward Academy/North Carolina	Newnan, GA
G	14	Preston Cook	6 ft 4 in (1.93 m)	205 lb (93 kg)	Sr	Auburn	Auburn, AL
G	20	Carter Sobera (W)	6 ft 5 in (1.96 m)	187 lb (85 kg)	So	Mountain Brook	Birmingham, AL
F	21	Ty Cressman (W)	6 ft 7 in (2.01 m)	244 lb (111 kg)	Jr	Bishop McGuinness	Greensboro, NC
G	22	Allen Flanigan	6 ft 6 in (1.98 m)	215 lb (98 kg)	Jr	Parkview Magnet	Little Rock, AR
C	23	Babatunde Akingbola	6 ft 10 in (2.08 m)	245 lb (111 kg)	Jr	McEachern	Ogun, Nigeria
G	24	Lior Berman (W)	6 ft 4 in (1.93 m)	215 lb (98 kg)	Jr	Mountain Brook	Birmingham, AL
G	25	Chandler Leopard (W)	6 ft 3 in (1.91 m)	195 lb (88 kg)	Jr	Athens	Athens, AL
G	31	Michael Whitmore (W)	5 ft 10 in (1.78 m)	160 lb (73 kg)	So	Woodward Academy	Dunwoody, GA
G	33	Chase Maasdorp (W)	6 ft 0 in (1.83 m)	175 lb (79 kg)	RS Jr	The Out-of-Door Academy	Lakewood Ranch, FL
G	35	Devan Cambridge	6 ft 6 in (1.98 m)	215 lb (98 kg)	Jr	Hillcrest Prep	Nashville, TN
C	44	Dylan Cardwell	6 ft 11 in (2.11 m)	250 lb (113 kg)	So	McEachern	Augusta, GA

Head coach

- Bruce Pearl (Boston College)

Assistant coach(es)

- Ira Bowman (Penn)
- Wes Flanigan (Auburn)
- Steven Pearl (Tennessee)

Legend

- (C) Team captain
- (S) Suspended
- (I) Ineligible
- (W) Walk-on
- Injured
- Current redshirt

Roster
Last update: September 21, 2021

== Schedule ==
Date time, TV	Rank^{#}	Opponent^{#}	Result	Record	High points	High rebounds	High assists	Site (attendance) city, state
Exhibition
November 5, 2021*; 7:00 pm	No. 22	Southern Indiana	W 68–54	–	13 – Cambridge	11 – Smith	4 – Johnson	Auburn Arena (7,649); Auburn, AL
Regular season
November 9, 2021*; 7:00 pm, SECN+	No. 22	Morehead State	W 77–54	1–0	19 – Green Jr.	7 – Smith	4 – Smith	Auburn Arena (9,121); Auburn, AL
November 12, 2021*; 7:00 pm, SECN+	No. 22	Louisiana–Monroe	W 93–65	2–0	23 – Smith	10 – Smith	6 – Jasper	Auburn Arena (9,121); Auburn, AL
November 19, 2021*; 6:00 pm, ESPN+	No. 21	at South Florida	W 58–52	3–0	15 – Johnson	10 – Smith	3 – Tied	Amalie Arena (4,040); Tampa, FL
November 24, 2021*; 1:30 pm, ESPN	No. 19	vs. No. 22 UConn; Battle 4 Atlantis quarterfinals	L 109–115 ^{2OT}	3–1	27 – Johnson	10 – Kessler	5 – Green Jr.	Imperial Arena (1,174); Nassau, Bahamas
November 25, 2021*; 1:30 pm, ESPN2	No. 19	vs. Loyola Chicago; Battle 4 Atlantis consolation round	W 62–53	4–1	14 – Smith	10 – Kessler	6 – Jasper	Imperial Arena (804); Nassau, Bahamas
November 26, 2021*; 3:30 pm, ESPN2	No. 19	vs. Syracuse; Battle 4 Atlantis 5th place game	W 89–68	5–1	22 – Smith	7 – Williams	7 – Green Jr.	Imperial Arena (1,136); Nassau, Bahamas
December 1, 2021*; 7:00 pm, SECN+	No. 21	UCF	W 85–68	6–1	20 – Smith	14 – Kessler	4 – Tied	Auburn Arena (9,121); Auburn, AL
December 4, 2021*; 1:00 pm, ESPNU	No. 21	Yale	W 86–64	7–1	19 – Johnson	10 – Cambridge	6 – Green Jr.	Auburn Arena (9,121); Auburn, AL
December 11, 2021*; 10:30 am, ESPN2	No. 18	vs. Nebraska; Holiday Hoopsgiving	W 99–68	8–1	21 – Smith	7 – Kessler	6 – Green Jr.	State Farm Arena (8,557); Atlanta, GA
December 14, 2021*; 8:00 pm, SECN	No. 13	North Alabama	W 70–44	9–1	14 – Kessler	10 – Smith	6 – Green Jr.	Auburn Arena (9,121); Auburn, AL
December 18, 2021*; 8:00 pm, CBSSN	No. 13	at Saint Louis	W 74–70	10–1	19 – Kessler	9 – Kessler	8 – Green Jr.	Chaifetz Arena (8,012); Saint Louis, MO
December 22, 2021*; 5:00 pm, SECN	No. 12	Murray State	W 71–58	11–1	13 – Tied	10 – Tied	3 – Smith	Auburn Arena (9,121); Auburn, AL
December 29, 2021; 6:00 pm, ESPN2	No. 11	No. 16 LSU	W 70–55	12–1 (1–0)	16 – Tied	10 – Kessler	3 – Green Jr.	Auburn Arena (9,121); Auburn, AL
January 4, 2022; 5:30 pm, SECN	No. 9	at South Carolina	W 81–66	13–1 (2–0)	22 – Green Jr.	10 – Kessler	5 – Green Jr.	Colonial Life Arena (8,528); Columbia, SC
January 8, 2022; 7:00 pm, ESPN2	No. 9	Florida	W 85–73	14–1 (3–0)	23 – Johnson	8 – Kessler	4 – Tied	Auburn Arena (9,121); Auburn, AL
January 11, 2022; 8:00 pm, ESPN	No. 4	at No. 24 Alabama; Iron Bowl of Basketball	W 81–77	15–1 (4–0)	25 – Smith	8 – Johnson	4 – Green Jr.	Coleman Coliseum (13,474); Tuscaloosa, AL
January 15, 2022; 7:30 pm, SECN	No. 4	at Ole Miss	W 80–71	16–1 (5–0)	20 – Kessler	10 – Kessler	7 – Green Jr.	SJB Pavilion (8,657); Oxford, MS
January 19, 2022; 8:00 pm, ESPNU	No. 2	Georgia	W 83–60	17–1 (6–0)	15 – Kessler	7 – Smith	11 – Green Jr.	Auburn Arena (9,121); Auburn, AL
January 22, 2022; 12:00 pm, CBS	No. 2	No. 12 Kentucky	W 80–71	18–1 (7–0)	19 – Kessler	7 – Tied	5 – Green Jr.	Auburn Arena (9,121); Auburn, AL
January 25, 2022; 7:30 pm, SECN	No. 1	at Missouri	W 55–54	19–1 (8–0)	17 – Johnson	12 – Kessler	3 – Green Jr.	Mizzou Arena (10,004); Columbia, MO
January 29, 2022*; 1:00 pm, ESPN	No. 1	Oklahoma; Big 12/SEC Challenge	W 86–68	20–1	23 – Smith	12 – Smith	4 – Flanigan	Auburn Arena (9,121); Auburn, AL
February 1, 2022; 8:00 pm, ESPN	No. 1	Alabama; Iron Bowl of Basketball	W 100–81	21–1 (9–0)	23 – Green Jr.	12 – Kessler	6 – Green Jr.	Auburn Arena (9,121); Auburn, AL
February 5, 2022; 12:00 pm, SECN	No. 1	at Georgia	W 74–72	22–1 (10–0)	20 – Johnson	9 – Kessler	3 – Green Jr.	Stegeman Coliseum (10,523); Athens, GA
February 8, 2022; 6:00 pm, ESPN2	No. 1	at Arkansas	L 76–80 ^{OT}	22–2 (10–1)	20 – Smith	19 – Kessler	5 – Green Jr.	Bud Walton Arena (20,327); Fayetteville, AR
February 12, 2022; 11:00 am, ESPN	No. 1	Texas A&M; ESPN College GameDay	W 75–58	23–2 (11–1)	16 – Flanigan	11 – Tied	5 – Green Jr.	Auburn Arena (9,121); Auburn, AL
February 16, 2022; 8:00 pm, SECN	No. 2	Vanderbilt	W 94–80	24–2 (12–1)	31 – Smith	7 – Tied	9 – Green Jr.	Auburn Arena (9,121); Auburn, AL
February 19, 2022; 1:00 pm, ESPN	No. 2	at Florida	L 62–63	24–3 (12–2)	28 – Smith	7 – Smith	5 – Green Jr.	O'Connell Center (11,255); Gainesville, FL
February 23, 2022; 7:30 pm, SECN	No. 3	Ole Miss	W 77–64	25–3 (13–2)	15 – Tied	10 – Kessler	5 – Smith	Auburn Arena (9,121); Auburn, AL
February 26, 2022; 3:00 pm, ESPN	No. 3	at No. 17 Tennessee	L 62–67	25–4 (13–3)	27 – Smith	8 – Smith	4 – Kessler	Thompson–Boling Arena (21,678); Knoxville, TN
March 2, 2022; 8:00 pm, SECN	No. 5	at Mississippi State	W 81–68 ^{OT}	26–4 (14–3)	27 – Smith	10 – Tied	7 – Green Jr.	Humphrey Coliseum (9,637); Starkville, MS
March 5, 2022; 12:00 pm, SECN	No. 5	South Carolina	W 82–71	27–4 (15–3)	21 – Smith	6 – Tied	7 – Green Jr.	Neville Arena (9,121); Auburn, AL
SEC Tournament
March 11, 2022; 11:00 am, ESPN	(1) No. 4	vs. (8) Texas A&M; Quarterfinals	L 62–67	27–5	17 – Smith	9 – Tied	4 – Smith	Amalie Arena (16,094); Tampa, FL
NCAA tournament
March 18, 2022*; 11:40 am, truTV	(2 MW) No. 8	vs. (15 MW) Jacksonville State; First Round	W 80–61	28–5	20 – Smith	14 – Smith	7 – Smith	Bon Secours Wellness Arena (14,255); Greenville, SC
March 20, 2022*; 6:45 pm, truTV	(2 MW) No. 8	vs. (10 MW) Miami (FL); Second Round	L 61–79	28–6	12 – Tied	15 – Smith	5 – Green Jr.	Bon Secours Wellness Arena (14,316); Greenville, SC
*Non-conference game. ^{#}Rankings from AP Poll. (#) Tournament seedings in parentheses. MW=Midwest. All times are in Central Time.

== Rankings ==
Ranking movements Legend: ██ Increase in ranking ██ Decrease in ranking т = Tied with team above or below ( ) = First-place votes
	Week																			
Poll	Pre	1	2	3	4	5	6	7	8	9	10	11	12	13	14	15	16	17	18	Final
AP	22	21	19	21	18	13	12	11	9	4	2 (36)	1 (45)	1 (49)	1 (48)	2 (4)	3	5	4	8	Not released
Coaches	22	22*	22	20	21	14	12	11	9	4	2 (8)	2 (13)	1т (16)	2 (14)	2 (2)	4	5	4 (1)	7	14

*No poll released

== See also ==
- 2021–22 Auburn Tigers women's basketball team
