= 2021–22 Ole Miss Rebels men's basketball team =

American college basketball season

2021–22 Ole Miss Rebels men's basketball
- Conference: Southeastern Conference
- Record: 13–19 (4–14 SEC)
- Head coach: Kermit Davis (4th season)
- Assistant coaches: Win Case; Ronnie Hamilton; Levi Watkins
- Home arena: SJB Pavilion

2021–22 Southeastern Conference men's basketball standings
	Conf.				Overall
Team	W		L	PCT	W		L	PCT
No. 14 Auburn	15	–	3	.833	28	–	6	.824
No. 16 Kentucky	14	–	4	.778	26	–	8	.765
No. 15 Tennessee †	14	–	4	.778	27	–	8	.771
No. 8 Arkansas	13	–	5	.722	28	–	9	.757
LSU	9	–	9	.500	22	–	12	.647
Alabama	9	–	9	.500	19	–	14	.576
South Carolina	9	–	9	.500	18	–	13	.581
Texas A&M	9	–	9	.500	27	–	13	.675
Florida	9	–	9	.500	20	–	14	.588
Mississippi State	8	–	10	.444	18	–	16	.529
Vanderbilt	7	–	11	.389	19	–	17	.528
Missouri	5	–	13	.278	12	–	21	.364
Ole Miss	4	–	14	.222	13	–	19	.406
Georgia	1	–	17	.056	6	–	26	.188
† 2022 SEC tournament winner Rankings from AP poll

The 2021–22 Ole Miss Rebels men's basketball team represented the University of Mississippi in the 2021–22 NCAA Division I men's basketball season. The Rebels were led by fourth-year head coach, Kermit Davis. The Rebels played their home games at The Sandy and John Black Pavilion at Ole Miss in Oxford, Mississippi as members of the Southeastern Conference.

== Previous season ==
The Rebels finished the 2020–21 season 16–12, 10–8 in SEC play to finish in sixth place. They lost in the first round of the NIT to Louisiana Tech.

== Offseason ==
=== Departures ===
Ole Miss Departures
Name	Number	Pos.	Height	Weight	Year	Hometown	Notes	Ref.
Romello White	0	F	6'8"	235	Graduate Student	Atlanta, GA	Signed with Hapoel Eilat B.C. in Israel	
Devontae Shuler	2	G	6'2"	185	Senior	Irmo, SC	Declared for 2021 NBA draft	
Khadim Sy	3	F	6'10"	238	Senior	Dakar, Senegal	Transferred to Wake Forest	
Antavion Collum	4	F	6'7"	230	Sophomore	Memphis, TN	Transferred to Cal State Bakersfield	
KJ Buffen	5	F	6'7"	230	Junior	Gainesville, GA	Transferred to UAB	
Shon Robinson	12	F	6'11"	220	RS Freshman	Chicago, IL	Transferred to San Jose State	
Dimencio Vaughn	14	G/F	6'5"	215	Graduate Student	New York, NY	Transferred to Rider	

=== 2021 recruiting class ===
College recruiting
Name	Hometown	School	Height	Weight	Commit date
Daeshun Ruffin #10 PG	Jackson, MS	Callaway HS	5 ft 9 in (1.75 m)	160 lb (73 kg)	Jun 17, 2020
Daeshun Ruffin #10 PG	Recruit ratings: Rivals: 247Sports: ESPN: (86)				
Grant Slatten; SG	Sparta, TN	White County HS	6 ft 5 in (1.96 m)	190 lb (86 kg)	Aug 4, 2020
Grant Slatten; SG	Recruit ratings: Rivals: 247Sports: ESPN: (79)				
Eric Van Der Heijden; PF	Raleigh, NC	Millbrook HS	6 ft 9 in (2.06 m)	205 lb (93 kg)	Mar 22, 2021
Eric Van Der Heijden; PF	Recruit ratings: Rivals: 247Sports: ESPN: (79)				
James White; SG	Conyers, GA	Heritage HS	6 ft 5 in (1.96 m)	175 lb (79 kg)	Aug 27, 2020
James White; SG	Recruit ratings: Rivals: 247Sports: ESPN: (75)				
Overall recruit ranking: 247Sports: 29
Note: In many cases, Scout, Rivals, 247Sports, On3, and ESPN may conflict in their listings of height and weight.; In these cases, the average was taken. ESPN grades are on a 100-point scale.; Sources: "Ole Miss 2021 Basketball Commitments". Rivals.; "2021 Team Ranking". Rivals.

=== Incoming transfers ===
Incoming transfers
Name	Number	Pos.	Height	Weight	Year	Hometown	Previous School	Ref.
Nysier Brooks	3	C	7'0"	245	Graduate Student	Philadelphia, PA	Miami (FL)	
Jaemyn Brakefield	4	F	6'8"	220	Sophomore	Jackson, MS	Duke	
Tye Fagan	14	G	6'3"	198	Senior	Logtown, GA	Georgia	

== Roster ==
2021–22 Ole Miss Rebels men's basketball team
Players
Coaches

Pos.	#	Name	Height	Weight	Year	Previous school	Hometown
F	0	Eric Van Der Heijden	6 ft 8 in (2.03 m)	205 lb (93 kg)	Fr	Millbrook HS	Raleigh, NC
G	1	Austin Crowley	6 ft 5 in (1.96 m)	195 lb (88 kg)	Jr	Sunrise Christian Academy	West Point, MS
G	2	Daeshun Ruffin	5 ft 9 in (1.75 m)	160 lb (73 kg)	Fr	Callaway HS	Jackson, MS
C	3	Nysier Brooks	7 ft 0 in (2.13 m)	245 lb (111 kg)	GS	Advanced Prep International; Miami (FL)	Philadelphia, PA
F	4	Jaemyn Brakefield	6 ft 8 in (2.03 m)	220 lb (100 kg)	So	Huntington Prep School; Duke	Jackson, MS
G	5	James White	6 ft 5 in (1.96 m)	190 lb (86 kg)	Fr	Heritage HS	Conyers, GA
G	10	Grant Slatten	6 ft 5 in (1.96 m)	195 lb (88 kg)	Fr	White County HS	Sparta, TN
G	11	Matthew Murrell	6 ft 4 in (1.93 m)	200 lb (91 kg)	So	IMG Academy	Memphis, TN
G	14	Tye Fagan	6 ft 3 in (1.91 m)	198 lb (90 kg)	Sr	Upson-Lee HS; Georgia	Logtown, GA
G/F	15	Luis Rodriguez	6 ft 6 in (1.98 m)	210 lb (95 kg)	RS Jr	Woodstock Academy	Los Angeles, CA
F	21	Robert Allen	6 ft 8 in (2.03 m)	230 lb (104 kg)	Sr	Edgewater HS; Samford	Orlando, FL
F	23	Sammy Hunter	6 ft 9 in (2.06 m)	225 lb (102 kg)	Jr	British Columbia Christian Academy	Nassau, Bahamas
G	24	Jarkel Joiner	6 ft 1 in (1.85 m)	180 lb (82 kg)	RS Sr	Oxford HS; Cal State Bakersfield	Oxford, MS
G	33	John McBride (W)	6 ft 7 in (2.01 m)	214 lb (97 kg)	RS Jr	Memphis University School	Memphis, TN

Head coach

- Kermit Davis (Mississippi State)

Assistant coach(es)

- Win Case (University of Science and Arts of Oklahoma)
- Ronnie Hamilton (UNC Pembroke)
- Levi Watkins (NC State)

Legend

- (C) Team captain
- (S) Suspended
- (I) Ineligible
- (W) Walk-on
- Injured
- Current redshirt

Roster

== Schedule ==
Date time, TV	Rank^{#}	Opponent^{#}	Result	Record	High points	High rebounds	High assists	Site (attendance) city, state
Exhibition
November 5, 2021*; 6:00 pm		Trevecca Nazarene	W 83–76		26 – Joiner	9 – Allen	4 – Rodriguez	SJB Pavilion (4,953); Oxford, MS
Non-conference regular season
November 9, 2021*; 6:30 pm, SECN+		New Orleans	W 82–61	1–0	13 – Crowley	5 – Allen	4 – Tied	SJB Pavilion (5,409); Oxford, MS
November 12, 2021*; 6:00 pm, SECN+		Charleston Southern	W 93–68	2–0	24 – Joiner	8 – Brakefield	9 – Crowley	SJB Pavilion (5,825); Oxford, MS
November 18, 2021*; 6:00 pm, ESPN2		vs. Marquette; Charleston Classic Quarterfinals	L 72–78	2–1	13 – Tied	7 – Brooks	6 – Crowley	TD Arena; Charleston, SC
November 19, 2021*; 8:30 pm, ESPN3		vs. Elon; Charleston Classic Consolation round	W 74–56	3–1	16 – Tied	8 – Allen	6 – Fagan	TD Arena (4,672); Charleston, SC
November 21, 2021*; 12:00 pm, ESPN2		vs. Boise State; Charleston Classic Consolation – 5th place game	L 50–60	3–2	10 – Joiner	6 – Brooks	4 – Fagan	TD Arena (2,407); Charleston, SC
November 26, 2021*; 3:00 pm, SECN+		Mississippi Valley State	W 73–58	4–2	15 – Tied	10 – Brooks	5 – Crowley	SJB Pavilion (5,905); Oxford, MS
November 30, 2021*; 6:30 pm, SECN+		Rider	W 75–51	5–2	18 – Joiner	15 – Brooks	5 – Crowley	SJB Pavilion (5,537); Oxford, MS
December 4, 2021*; 11:00 am, ESPN2		No. 18 Memphis	W 67–63	6–2	20 – Joiner	8 – Joiner	4 – Crowley	SJB Pavilion (8,629); Oxford, MS
December 11, 2021*; 7:30 pm, SECN		vs. Western Kentucky; Holiday Hoopsgiving	L 48–71	6–3	13 – Joiner	6 – Brooks	3 – Rodriguez	State Farm Arena (6,157); Atlanta, GA
December 15, 2021*; 6:30 pm, SECN+		Middle Tennessee	W 62–52	7–3	12 – Tied	8 – Tied	5 – Joiner	SJB Pavilion (5,902); Oxford, MS
December 18, 2021*; 5:30 pm, SECN		Dayton	W 76–68	8–3	19 – Ruffin	11 – Brooks	3 – Tied	SJB Pavilion (6,199); Oxford, MS
December 21, 2021*; 3:00 pm, SECN+		Samford	L 73–75	8–4	17 – Ruffin	7 – Tied	5 – Ruffin	SJB Pavilion (5,649); Oxford, MS
SEC regular season
January 5, 2022; 6:00 pm, SECN		at No. 18 Tennessee	L 60–66 ^{OT}	8–5 (0–1)	23 – Fagan	10 – Brooks	3 – Tied	Thompson–Boling Arena (15,617); Knoxville, TN
January 8, 2022; 7:30 pm, SECN		Mississippi State	W 82–72	9–5 (1–1)	31 – Murrell	16 – Brooks	8 – Ruffin	SJB Pavilion (6,988); Oxford, MS
January 11, 2022; 7:30 pm, SECN		at Texas A&M	L 51–67	9–6 (1–2)	11 – Murrell	7 – Rodriguez	4 – Ruffin	Reed Arena (6,053); College Station, TX
January 15, 2022; 7:30 pm, SECN		No. 4 Auburn	L 71–80	9–7 (1–3)	17 – Fagan	8 – Tied	5 – Brakefield	SJB Pavilion (8,657); Oxford, MS
January 18, 2022; 6:00 pm, ESPNU		Missouri	L 53–78	9–8 (1–4)	12 – Ruffin	10 – Brooks	3 – Murrell	SJB Pavilion (6,514); Oxford, MS
January 22, 2022; 3:00 pm, ESPNU		at Mississippi State	L 60–78	9–9 (1–5)	14 – Murrell	5 – Murrell	6 – Ruffin	Humphrey Coliseum (9,739); Starkville, MS
January 24, 2022; 6:00 p.m., SECN+		Florida	W 70–54	10–9 (2–5)	21 – Ruffin	7 – Tied	6 – Ruffin	SJB Pavilion (6,273); Oxford, MS
January 26, 2022; 6:00 pm, SECN		Arkansas	L 55–64	10–10 (2–6)	14 – Murrell	7 – Rodriguez	3 – Murrell	SJB Pavilion (6,642); Oxford, MS
January 29, 2022*; 3:00 pm, ESPNU		Kansas State; Big 12/SEC Challenge	W 67–56	11–10	17 – Ruffin	9 – Brooks	3 – Ruffin	SJB Pavilion (7,135); Oxford, MS
February 1, 2022; 8:00 pm, SECN		at No. 25 LSU	W 76–72	12–10 (3–6)	19 – Ruffin	12 – Rodriguez	3 – Ruffin	Pete Maravich Assembly Center (9,707); Baton Rouge, LA
February 5, 2022; 2:30 pm, SECN		at Florida	L 57–62 ^{OT}	12–11 (3–7)	15 – Fagan	11 – Rodriguez	2 – Tied	O'Connell Center (10,007); Gainesville, FL
February 9, 2022; 7:30 pm, SECN		Alabama	L 83–97	12–12 (3–8)	33 – Joiner	7 – Brooks	9 – Rodriguez	SJB Pavilion (6,454); Oxford, MS
February 12, 2022; 7:30 pm, SECN		at Missouri	L 68–74	12–13 (3–9)	15 – Murrell	10 – Rodriguez	4 – Joiner	Mizzou Arena (8,397); Columbia, MO
February 15, 2022; 6:00 pm, ESPNU		South Carolina	L 74–77 ^{OT}	12–14 (3–10)	18 – Tied	13 – Rodriguez	4 – Crowley	SJB Pavilion (5,813); Oxford, MS
February 19, 2022; 12:00 pm, SECN		at Georgia	W 85–68	13–14 (4–10)	20 – Fagan	6 – Brooks	5 – Tied	Stegeman Coliseum (7,380); Athens, GA
February 23, 2022; 7:30 pm, SECN		at No. 3 Auburn	L 64–77	13–15 (4–11)	13 – Joiner	7 – Brooks	3 – Crowley	Auburn Arena (9,121); Auburn, AL
February 26, 2022; 2:30 pm, SECN		Texas A&M	L 66–76	13–16 (4–12)	20 – Murrell	7 – Brooks	8 – Fagan	SJB Pavilion (6,654); Oxford, MS
March 1, 2022; 6:00 pm, ESPN		at No. 7 Kentucky	L 72–83	13–17 (4–13)	25 – Murrell	8 – Brakefield	4 – Murrell	Rupp Arena (20,322); Lexington, KY
March 5, 2022; 5:00 pm, SECN		Vanderbilt	L 61–63	13–18 (4–14)	15 – Murrell	7 – Brakefield	7 – Crowley	SJB Pavilion (6,173); Oxford, MS
SEC tournament
March 9, 2022; 5:00 pm, SECN	(13)	vs. (12) Missouri; First round	L 60–72	13–19	16 – Murrell	5 – Brakefield	2 – Tied	Amalie Arena (7,121); Tampa, FL
*Non-conference game. ^{#}Rankings from AP Poll. (#) Tournament seedings in parentheses. All times are in Central Time.

Schedule source:

== See also ==
- 2021–22 Ole Miss Rebels women's basketball team
