= 2021–22 Missouri Tigers men's basketball team =

American college basketball season

2021–22 Missouri Tigers men's basketball
- Conference: Southeastern Conference
- Record: 12–21 (5–13 SEC)
- Head coach: Cuonzo Martin (5th season)
- Assistant coaches: Chris Hollender; Cornell Mann; Marco Harris
- Home arena: Mizzou Arena

2021–22 Southeastern Conference men's basketball standings
	Conf.				Overall
Team	W		L	PCT	W		L	PCT
No. 14 Auburn	15	–	3	.833	28	–	6	.824
No. 16 Kentucky	14	–	4	.778	26	–	8	.765
No. 15 Tennessee †	14	–	4	.778	27	–	8	.771
No. 8 Arkansas	13	–	5	.722	28	–	9	.757
LSU	9	–	9	.500	22	–	12	.647
Alabama	9	–	9	.500	19	–	14	.576
South Carolina	9	–	9	.500	18	–	13	.581
Texas A&M	9	–	9	.500	27	–	13	.675
Florida	9	–	9	.500	20	–	14	.588
Mississippi State	8	–	10	.444	18	–	16	.529
Vanderbilt	7	–	11	.389	19	–	17	.528
Missouri	5	–	13	.278	12	–	21	.364
Ole Miss	4	–	14	.222	13	–	19	.406
Georgia	1	–	17	.056	6	–	26	.188
† 2022 SEC tournament winner Rankings from AP poll

The 2021–22 Missouri Tigers men's basketball team represented the University of Missouri in the 2021–22 NCAA Division I men's basketball season and were led by head coach Cuonzo Martin, who was in his fifth year at Missouri. The team played its home games at Mizzou Arena in Columbia, Missouri as a tenth-year members of the Southeastern Conference. They finished the season 12–21, 5–13 in SEC play to finish in 12th place. They defeated Ole Miss in the first round of the SEC tournament before losing to LSU in the second round.

On March 11, 2022, the school fired head coach Cuonzo Martin. On March 22, the school named Cleveland State head coach Dennis Gates the team's new head coach.

== Previous season ==
In a season limited due to the ongoing COVID-19 pandemic the Tigers finish the 2020–21 season 16– 10, 8–8 in SEC play to finish in seventh place. They defeated Georgia in the second round of the SEC tournament before losing to Arkansas. They received an at-large bid to the NCAA tournament as the No. 9 seed in the West Region. There they lost in the First Round to Oklahoma.

=== Departures ===
Listed below are players who have entered their names in the Transfer pool and can at anytime remove their name and return to Missouri.
Seniors listed below have the option to use their additional year of eligibility.

Name	Number	Pos.	Height	Weight	Year	Hometown	Notes
Torrence Watson	0	G	6'5"	205	Junior	St. Louis, MO	Transferred to Elon
Xavier Pinson	1	G	6'2"	170	Junior	Chicago, IL	Transferred to LSU
Drew Buggs	2	G	6'3"	195	Graduate Student	Long Beach, CA	Transferred to Winthrop
Mitchell Smith	5	F	6'10"	221	RS-Senior	Van Buren, AR	Graduated, signed with Norrköping Dolphins
Ed Chang	11	F	6'8"	215	Junior	Papillion, NE	Entered Transfer Pool
Dru Smith	12	G	6'3"	203	RS-Senior	Evansville, IL	Graduated
Mark Smith	13	G	6'5"	220	Senior	Decatur, IL	Graduate Transfer to Kansas State
Jeremiah Tilmon	23	C	6'10"	260	Senior	East St. Louis, IL	Graduated, signed with Lakeland Magic
Parker Braun	42	F	6'8"	217	RS-Sophomore	Overland Park, KS	Transferred to Santa Clara

=== 2021 recruiting class ===
College recruiting information
Name	Hometown	School	Height	Weight	Commit date
Anton Brookshire; G	Springfield, Missouri	Kickapoo High School	6 ft 0 in (1.83 m)	165 lb (75 kg)	May 7, 2020
Anton Brookshire; G	Recruit ratings: Scout: Rivals: 247Sports: ESPN: (82)				
Yaya Keita; C	St. Louis, Missouri	De Smet Jesuit High School	6 ft 9 in (2.06 m)	215 lb (98 kg)	Sep 10, 2020
Yaya Keita; C	Recruit ratings: Scout: Rivals: 247Sports: ESPN: (79)				
Trevon Brazile; F	Springfield, Missouri	Parkview High School	6 ft 7 in (2.01 m)	200 lb (91 kg)	Sep 8, 2020
Trevon Brazile; F	Recruit ratings: Scout: Rivals: 247Sports: ESPN: (79)				
Sean Durugordon; F	Putnam, Connecticut	Putnam Science Academy	6 ft 6 in (1.98 m)	210 lb (95 kg)	Aug 26, 2020
Sean Durugordon; F	Recruit ratings: Scout: Rivals: 247Sports: ESPN: (78)				
Kaleb Brown; G	Huntsville, Alabama	Lee High School	6 ft 6 in (1.98 m)	218 lb (99 kg)	Aug 24, 2020
Kaleb Brown; G	Recruit ratings: (NR)				
Overall recruit ranking:
Note: In many cases, Scout, Rivals, 247Sports, On3, and ESPN may conflict in their listings of height and weight.; In these cases, the average was taken. ESPN grades are on a 100-point scale.; Sources:

=== Incoming transfers ===
Name	Number	Pos.	Height	Weight	Year	Hometown	Notes
Amari Davis	1	G	6'2"	175	Junior	Trotwood, OH	Transfer from Green Bay. Will have three years of eligibility remaining.
Jarron Coleman	5	G	6'5"	210	Redshirt Junior	Indianapolis, IN	Transfer from Ball State. Will have three years of eligibility remaining.
DaJuan Gordon	12	G	6'3"	190	Junior	Chicago, IL	Transfer from Kansas State. Will have three years of eligibility remaining.
Ronnie DeGray III	21	F	6'6"	225	Sophomore	Parker, CO	Transfer from UMass.

== Roster ==
2021–22 Missouri Tigers men's basketball team
Players
Coaches

Pos.	#	Name	Height	Weight	Year	Previous school	Hometown
G	0	Anton Brookshire	6 ft 1 in (1.85 m)	175 lb (79 kg)	Fr	Kickapoo High School	Springfield, MO
G	1	Amari Davis	6 ft 2 in (1.88 m)	175 lb (79 kg)	Jr	Trotwood-Madison High School; Green Bay	Trotwood, OH
F	2	Sean Durugordon	6 ft 5 in (1.96 m)	215 lb (98 kg)	RS Fr	Putnam Science Academy	Queens, NY
G	4	Javon Pickett	6 ft 5 in (1.96 m)	215 lb (98 kg)	Sr	Belleville East High School	Belleville, IL
G	5	Jarron Coleman	6 ft 5 in (1.96 m)	210 lb (95 kg)	RS Jr	Cathedral High School; Ball State	Indianapolis, IN
F	11	Yaya Keita	6 ft 8 in (2.03 m)	240 lb (109 kg)	Fr	De Smet Jesuit High School	St. Louis, MO
G	12	DaJuan Gordon	6 ft 3 in (1.91 m)	190 lb (86 kg)	Jr	Curie High School; Kansas State	Chicago, IL
G	13	Kaleb Brown	6 ft 6 in (1.98 m)	250 lb (113 kg)	Fr	Lee High School	Huntsville, AL
F	21	Ronnie DeGray III	6 ft 6 in (1.98 m)	225 lb (102 kg)	So	Woodstock Academy; UMass	Parker, CO
F	23	Trevon Brazile	6 ft 9 in (2.06 m)	215 lb (98 kg)	Fr	Parkview High School	Springfield, MO
F	24	Kobe Brown	6 ft 8 in (2.03 m)	250 lb (113 kg)	Jr	Lee High School	Huntsville, AL
C	32	Jordan Wilmore	7 ft 3 in (2.21 m)	300 lb (136 kg)	So	The Skill Factory Prep School	Laurel, MD

Head coach

- Cuonzo Martin (Purdue)

Assistant coach(es)

- Chris Hollender (Evansville)
- Cornell Mann (Akron)
- Marco Harris (Southwestern Oklahoma State)

Legend

- (C) Team captain
- (S) Suspended
- (I) Ineligible
- (W) Walk-on
- Injured
- Current redshirt

Roster

== Schedule and results ==
Date time, TV	Rank^{#}	Opponent^{#}	Result	Record	High points	High rebounds	High assists	Site (attendance) city, state
Non-conference regular Season
November 9, 2021*; 7:00 pm, SECN+		Central Michigan	W 78–68	1–0	18 – Pickett	12 – DeGray III	5 – Coleman	Mizzou Arena (7,272); Columbia, MO
November 15, 2021*; 7:00 pm, SECN+		Kansas City	L 66–80	1–1	20 – Ko. Brown	7 – Davis	4 – Gordon	Mizzou Arena (6,887); Columbia, MO
November 18, 2021*; 7:00 pm, SECN+		Northern Illinois; Jacksonville Classic campus game	W 54–37	2–1	13 – Ko. Brown	13 – Ko. Brown	6 – Ko. Brown	Mizzou Arena (6,302); Columbia, MO
November 21, 2021*; 7:00 p.m., CBSSN		vs. SMU; Jacksonville Classic Duval semifinal game	W 80–75 ^{OT}	3–1	24 – Ko. Brown	8 – Gordon	7 – Coleman	UNF Arena (1,632); Jacksonville, FL
November 22, 2021*; 7:30 p.m., CBSSN		vs. Florida State; Jacksonville Classic Duval championship	L 58–81	3–2	14 – Davis	5 – Gordon	3 – Tied	UNF Arena (1,641); Jacksonville, FL
November 26, 2021*; 8:00 p.m., SECN		Wichita State	L 55–61	3–3	17 – Davis	8 – Ko. Brown	4 – Coleman	Mizzou Arena (NR); Columbia, MO
November 29, 2021*; 7:00 p.m., SECN+		Paul Quinn College	W 91–59	4–3	20 – Ko. Brown	23 – Ko. Brown	6 – Ko. Brown	Mizzou Arena (6,106); Columbia, MO
December 2, 2021*; 6:00 p.m., ESPN+		at Liberty	L 45–66	4–4	14 – Ko. Brown	10 – Ko. Brown	2 – Ko. Brown	Liberty Arena (4,005); Lynchburg, VA
December 7, 2021*; 7:00 p.m., SECN+		Eastern Illinois	W 72–44	5–4	15 – Davis	11 – Ko. Brown	5 – Pickett	Mizzou Arena (6,335); Columbia, MO
December 11, 2021*; 2:15 p.m., ESPN		at No. 8 Kansas; Border War	L 65–102	5–5	19 – Pickett	6 – Brown	3 – Gordon	Allen Fieldhouse (16,300); Lawrence, KS
December 18, 2021*; 3:30 p.m., SECN		Utah	W 83–75	6–5	27 – Brown	7 – DeGray III	3 – Pickett	Mizzou Arena (6,782); Columbia, MO
December 22, 2021*; 8:00 p.m., BTN		vs. Illinois; Braggin' Rights	L 63–88	6–6	16 – Coleman	7 – Brown	1 – Brookshire	Enterprise Center (14,953); St. Louis, MO
SEC regular Season
December 29, 2021; 6:00 p.m., SECN		at No. 18 Kentucky	L 56–83	6–7 (0–1)	10 – Tied	6 – Pickett	3 – Coleman	Rupp Arena (19,361); Lexington, KY
January 8, 2022; 2:30 p.m., SECN		No. 15 Alabama	W 92–86	7–7 (1–1)	30 – Ko. Brown	13 – Ko. Brown	6 – Coleman	Mizzou Arena (10,903); Columbia, MO
January 12, 2022; 8:00 p.m., SECN		at Arkansas	L 43–87	7–8 (1–2)	12 – Pickett	8 – Brazile	3 – Coleman	Bud Walton Arena (19,200); Fayetteville, AR
January 15, 2022; 2:30 p.m., SECN		Texas A&M	L 64–67	7–9 (1–3)	14 – Coleman	9 – Ko. Brown	5 – Davis	Mizzou Arena (7,989); Columbia, MO
January 18, 2022; 6:00 p.m., ESPNU		at Ole Miss	W 78–53	8–9 (2–3)	23 – Davis	13 – Coleman	7 – Coleman	SJB Pavilion (6,514); Oxford, MS
January 22, 2022; 5:00 p.m., SECN		at Alabama	L 76–86	8–10 (2–4)	17 – Coleman	10 – Ko. Brown	4 – Ko. Brown	Coleman Coliseum (10,799); Tuscaloosa, AL
January 25, 2022; 7:30 p.m., SECN		No. 1 Auburn	L 54–55	8–11 (2–5)	17 – Pickett	11 – Ko. Brown	3 – Ko. Brown	Mizzou Arena (10,004); Columbia, MO
January 29, 2022*; 1:00 p.m., ESPNU		at No. 23 Iowa State; Big 12/SEC Challenge	L 50–67	8–12	15 – Gordon	7 – Gordon	3 – Tied	Hilton Coliseum (13,612); Ames, IA
February 2, 2022; 7:30 p.m., SECN		Florida	L 65–66	8–13 (2–6)	13 – DeGray III	9 – Gordon	4 – Coleman	Mizzou Arena; Columbia, MO
February 5, 2022; 3:00 p.m., ESPN2		at Texas A&M	W 70–66	9–13 (3–6)	21 – Brown	6 – Brown	6 – Brown	Reed Arena (8,013); College Station, TX
February 8, 2022; 8:00 p.m., SECN		at Vanderbilt	L 62–70	9–14 (3–7)	15 – Pickett	9 – Brown	3 – Tied	Memorial Gymnasium (6,406); Nashville, TN
February 12, 2022; 8:00 p.m., SECN		Ole Miss	W 74–68	10–14 (4–7)	15 – Murrell	10 – Rodriguez	4 – Joiner	Mizzou Arena (8,397); Columbia, MO
February 15, 2022; 8:00 p.m., SECN		No. 23 Arkansas	L 57–76	10–15 (4–8)	13 – Pickett	8 – Brazile	3 – Coleman	Mizzou Arena (7,448); Columbia, MO
February 18, 2022; 8:30 p.m., SECN		at Mississippi State	L 49–68	10–16 (4–9)	13 – DeGray III	8 – Brazile	2 – Tied	Humphrey Coliseum (6,813); Starkville, MS
February 20, 2022; 7:00 p.m., SECN		Mississippi State; Rescheduled from Jan. 5	L 56–58	10–17 (4–10)	16 – Pickett	7 – Brown	4 – Pickett	Mizzou Arena (7,009); Columbia, MO
February 22, 2022; 6:00 p.m., SECN		No. 17 Tennessee	L 61–80	10–18 (4–11)	16 – Pickett	9 – Brown	2 – Tied	Mizzou Arena (7,253); Columbia, MO
February 26, 2022; 7:30 p.m., SECN		at LSU	L 55–75	10–19 (4–12)	14 – Pickett	8 – Brown	7 – Pickett	Pete Maravich Assembly Center (9,304); Baton Rouge, LA
March 1, 2022; 6:00 p.m., ESPNU		at South Carolina	L 69–73	10–20 (4–13)	23 – Pickett	9 – Brazile	3 – DeGray III	Colonial Life Arena (9,479); Columbia, SC
March 5, 2022; 2:30 p.m., SECN		Georgia	W 79–69	11–20 (5–13)	21 – Brown	10 – Brazile	3 – Pickett	Mizzou Arena (8,397); Columbia, MO
SEC Tournament
March 9, 2022; 5:00 p.m., SECN	(12)	vs. (13) Ole Miss; First round	W 72–60	12–20	16 – Brown	8 – Brazile	4 – Brown	Amalie Arena; Tampa, FL
March 10, 2022; 1:00 p.m., SECN	(12)	vs. (5) LSU; Second round	L 68–76	12–21	19 – Gordon	8 – Brazile	5 – Ka. Brown	Amalie Arena; Tampa, FL
*Non-conference game. ^{#}Rankings from AP Poll. (#) Tournament seedings in parentheses. All times are in Central Time.

== See also ==
- 2021–22 Missouri Tigers women's basketball team
