= 2021–22 Georgia Bulldogs basketball team =

American college basketball season

2021–22 Georgia Bulldogs basketball
- Conference: Southeastern Conference
- Record: 6–26 (1–17 SEC)
- Head coach: Tom Crean (4th season)
- Assistant coaches: Steve McClain; John Linehan; Wade Mason
- Home arena: Stegeman Coliseum

2021–22 Southeastern Conference men's basketball standings
	Conf.				Overall
Team	W		L	PCT	W		L	PCT
No. 14 Auburn	15	–	3	.833	28	–	6	.824
No. 16 Kentucky	14	–	4	.778	26	–	8	.765
No. 15 Tennessee †	14	–	4	.778	27	–	8	.771
No. 8 Arkansas	13	–	5	.722	28	–	9	.757
LSU	9	–	9	.500	22	–	12	.647
Alabama	9	–	9	.500	19	–	14	.576
South Carolina	9	–	9	.500	18	–	13	.581
Texas A&M	9	–	9	.500	27	–	13	.675
Florida	9	–	9	.500	20	–	14	.588
Mississippi State	8	–	10	.444	18	–	16	.529
Vanderbilt	7	–	11	.389	19	–	17	.528
Missouri	5	–	13	.278	12	–	21	.364
Ole Miss	4	–	14	.222	13	–	19	.406
Georgia	1	–	17	.056	6	–	26	.188
† 2022 SEC tournament winner Rankings from AP poll

The 2021–22 Georgia Bulldogs basketball team represented the University of Georgia during the 2021–22 NCAA Division I men's basketball season. The team was led by fourth-year head coach Tom Crean, and played their home games at Stegeman Coliseum in Athens, Georgia as a member of the Southeastern Conference. The Bulldogs finished the season 6–26, 1–17 in SEC play to finish in last place. They lost to Vanderbilt in the first round of the SEC tournament. The 26 losses set the school record for most losses in a single season surpassing the previous record set by the 1951–52 team.

On March 10, 2022, the school fired Tom Crean after four years as head coach. Three days later, the school named Florida coach Mike White the team's new head coach.

== Previous season ==
In a season limited due to the ongoing COVID-19 pandemic, the Bulldogs finished the 2020–21 season 14–12, 7–11 in SEC play to finish in 10th place. They lost in the second round of the SEC tournament to Missouri.

== Offseason ==
=== Departures ===
Name	Number	Pos.	Height	Weight	Year	Hometown	Reason for departure
K. D. Johnson	0	G	6'1"	190	Freshman	Atlanta, GA	Transferred to Auburn
Sahvir Wheeler	2	G	5'10"	180	Sophomore	Houston, TX	Transferred to Kentucky
Christian Brown	3	F	6'6"	215	Sophomore	Hopkins, SC	Transferred to Tennessee
Andrew Garcia	4	F	6'6"	225	Graduate Student	Bergenfield, NJ	Graduate transferred to Kent State
Justin Kier	5	G	6'4"	190	Graduate Student	Grottoes, VA	Graduate transferred to Arizona
Toumani Camara	10	F	6'8"	220	Sophomore	Brussels, Belgium	Transferred to Dayton
Tye Fagan	14	G	6'3"	195	Junior	Thomaston, GA	Transferred to Ole Miss
Mikal Starks	23	G	6'0"	185	Junior	Miami, FL	Transferred to Portland State

=== Incoming transfers ===
Name	Number	Pos.	Height	Weight	Year	Hometown	Previous School
Jaliyn Ingram	0	F	6'7"	225	Graduate Student	Madison, GA	Florida Atlantic
Jabri Abdur-Rahim	1	G/F	6'8"	210	Sophomore	South Orange, NJ	Virginia
Kario Oquendo	3	G	6'4"	215	Sophomore	Titusville, FL	Florida SouthWestern State College
Aaron Cook Jr.	10	G	6'2"	185	Graduate Student	St. Louis, MO	Gonzaga
Dalen Ridgnal	15	F	6'7"	200	Junior	Kansas City, MO	Cowley College
Noah Baumann	20	G	6'6"	210	RS Senior	Phoenix, AZ	USC
Braelen Bridges	23	F	6'11"	240	RS Senior	Atlanta, GA	UIC

=== 2021 recruiting class ===
College recruiting information
Name	Hometown	School	Height	Weight	Commit date
Tyrone Baker #25 C	Fort Myers, FL	Hightower High School	6 ft 9 in (2.06 m)	210 lb (95 kg)	Jan 18, 2021
Tyrone Baker #25 C	Recruit ratings: Scout: Rivals: 247Sports: ESPN: (79)				
Cam McDowell; SG	Powder Springs, GA	McEachern High School	6 ft 5 in (1.96 m)	170 lb (77 kg)	Nov 18, 2020
Cam McDowell; SG	Recruit ratings: Scout: Rivals: 247Sports: ESPN: (NR)				
Christian Wright; SG	Alpharetta, GA	The Skill Factory	6 ft 3 in (1.91 m)	180 lb (82 kg)	Apr 20, 2021
Christian Wright; SG	Recruit ratings: Scout: Rivals: 247Sports: ESPN: (NR)				
Overall recruit ranking:
Note: In many cases, Scout, Rivals, 247Sports, On3, and ESPN may conflict in their listings of height and weight.; In these cases, the average was taken. ESPN grades are on a 100-point scale.; Sources: "Georgia 2021 Basketball Commitments". Rivals.; "2021 Georgia Bulldogs Recruiting Class". ESPN.; "2021 Team Ranking". Rivals.

== Roster ==
2021–22 Georgia Bulldogs men's basketball team
Players
Coaches

Pos.	#	Name	Height	Weight	Year	Previous school	Hometown
F	0	Jailyn Ingram	6 ft 7 in (2.01 m)	225 lb (102 kg)	GS	Florida Atlantic	Madison, Georgia
G/F	1	Jabri Abdur-Rahim	6 ft 8 in (2.03 m)	210 lb (95 kg)	So	Virginia	South Orange, New Jersey
G	2	Cam McDowell	6 ft 5 in (1.96 m)	185 lb (84 kg)	Fr	McEachern HS	Powder Springs, Georgia
G	3	Kario Oquendo	6 ft 4 in (1.93 m)	215 lb (98 kg)	So	Florida SouthWestern State College	Titusville, Florida
F	4	Tyron McMillan	6 ft 9 in (2.06 m)	220 lb (100 kg)	Jr	Kilgore College	New Orleans, Louisiana
G	5	Christian Wright	6 ft 3 in (1.91 m)	185 lb (84 kg)	Fr	The Skill Factory	Alpharetta, Georgia
G	10	Aaron Cook Jr.	6 ft 2 in (1.88 m)	185 lb (84 kg)	GS	Gonzaga	St. Louis, Missouri
G	11	Jaxon Etter (W)	6 ft 4 in (1.93 m)	205 lb (93 kg)	Jr	Etowah HS	Woodstock, Georgia
F	12	Josh Taylor	6 ft 9 in (2.06 m)	215 lb (98 kg)	So	Norcross HS	Atlanta, Georgia
F	13	Jonathan Ned	6 ft 9 in (2.06 m)	220 lb (100 kg)	Sr	Eastern Florida College	Brentwood, California
F	15	Dalen Ridgnal	6 ft 7 in (2.01 m)	200 lb (91 kg)	Jr	Cowley College	Kansas City, Missouri
G	20	Noah Baumann	6 ft 6 in (1.98 m)	210 lb (95 kg)	RS Sr	USC	Phoenix, Arizona
F	23	Braelen Bridges	6 ft 11 in (2.11 m)	240 lb (109 kg)	RS Sr	UIC	Atlanta, Georgia
F	24	P. J. Horne	6 ft 6 in (1.98 m)	225 lb (102 kg)	GS	Virginia Tech	Tifton, Georgia
C	35	Tyrone Baker	6 ft 11 in (2.11 m)	210 lb (95 kg)	Fr	Hightower HS	Fort Myers, Florida

Head coach

- Tom Crean (Central Michigan)

Assistant coach(es)

- Steve McClain (Chadron State)
- John Linehan (Providence)
- Wade Mason (Tulane)

Legend

- (C) Team captain
- (S) Suspended
- (I) Ineligible
- (W) Walk-on
- Injured
- Current redshirt

Roster

== Schedule and results ==
Date time, TV	Rank^{#}	Opponent^{#}	Result	Record	High points	High rebounds	High assists	Site (attendance) city, state
Exhibition
October 24, 2021*; 3:00 p.m.		at Charlotte; Charity Exhibition	L 65–76		–	–	–	Dale F. Halton Arena; Charlotte, NC
November 5, 2021*; 7:00 p.m., SECN+		Morehouse	W 64–49		–	–	–	Stegeman Coliseum; Athens, GA
Non-conference regular season
November 9, 2021*; 7:00 p.m., SECN+		FIU	W 58–51	1–0	10 – Cook	8 – Bridges	8 – Cook	Stegeman Coliseum (6,023); Athens, GA
November 13, 2021*; 7:00 p.m., ESPN+		at Cincinnati	L 68–73	1–1	24 – Bridges	8 – Bridges	10 – Cook	Fifth Third Arena (10,672); Cincinnati, OH
November 16, 2021*; 7:00 p.m., SECN+		South Carolina State	W 76–60	2–1	22 – Cook	8 – Bridges	7 – Cook	Stegeman Coliseum (6,021); Athens, GA
November 19, 2021*; 9:00 p.m., SECN		Georgia Tech	L 78–88	2–2	18 – Cook	6 – Ingram	6 – Cook	Stegeman Coliseum (9,057); Athens, GA
November 22, 2021*; 7:00 p.m., ESPNU		vs. Virginia; Legends Classic semifinals	L 55–65	2–3	14 – Bridges	12 – Ingram	8 – Cook	Prudential Center; Newark, NJ
November 23, 2021*; 5:00 p.m., ESPN2		vs. Northwestern; Legends Classic	L 62–78	2–4	12 – Tied	9 – Ingram	6 – Cook	Prudential Center; Newark, NJ
November 28, 2021*; 4:00 p.m., SECN+		Wofford	L 65–68	2–5	20 – Abdur-Rahim	5 – McMillan	5 – Wright	Stegeman Coliseum (6,090); Athens, GA
December 1, 2021*; 7:15 p.m., SECN		No. 18 Memphis; American/SEC Alliance	W 82–79	3–5	24 – Oquendo	6 – Tied	3 – Tied	Stegeman Coliseum (7,147); Athens, GA
December 7, 2021*; 7:00 p.m., SECN+		Jacksonville	W 69–58	4–5	14 – Bridges	6 – Oquendo	5 – Cook	Stegeman Coliseum (6,017); Athens, GA
December 18, 2021*; 7:00 p.m., SECN+		George Mason	L 67–80	4–6	13 – Bridges	7 – Tied	5 – Cook	Stegeman Coliseum (6,432); Athens, GA
December 20, 2021*; 7:00 p.m., SECN+		Western Carolina	W 85–79	5–6	21 – Oquendo	11 – Baumann	12 – Cook	Stegeman Coliseum (7,271); Athens, GA
December 22, 2021*; 7:00 p.m., SECN+		East Tennessee State	L 84–86	5–7	25 – Baumann	7 – Baumann	6 – Cook	Stegeman Coliseum (6,418); Athens, GA
December 29, 2021*; 7:00 p.m., SECN+		Gardner–Webb	L 60–77	5–8	17 – Bridges	7 – Bridges	5 – Cook	Stegeman Coliseum (6,476); Athens, GA
SEC regular season
January 4, 2022; 7:00 p.m., ESPNU		Texas A&M	L 79–81	5–9 (0–1)	21 – Oquendo	7 – Bridges	6 – Cook	Stegeman Coliseum (5,556); Athens, GA
January 8, 2022; 6:00 p.m., SECN		at No. 16 Kentucky	L 77–92	5–10 (0–2)	22 – Oquendo	7 – Oquendo	5 – Cook	Rupp Arena (19,343); Lexington, KY
January 12, 2022; 7:00 p.m., SECN		at Mississippi State	L 72–88	5–11 (0–3)	28 – Oquendo	7 – Bridges	4 – Cook	Humphrey Coliseum (5,973); Starkville, MS
January 15, 2022; 6:00 p.m., ESPN2		Vanderbilt	L 66–73	5–12 (0–4)	16 – Etter	7 – Baumann	4 – Cook	Stegeman Coliseum (6,980); Athens, GA
January 19, 2022; 9:00 p.m., ESPNU		at No. 2 Auburn	L 60–83	5–13 (0–5)	16 – Wright	7 – Ridgnal	6 – Bridges	Auburn Arena (9,121); Auburn, AL
January 22, 2022; 3:30 p.m., SECN		at South Carolina	L 66–83	5–14 (0–6)	20 – Bridges	5 – Tied	7 – Cook	Colonial Life Arena (10,478); Columbia, SC
January 25, 2022; 6:30 p.m., SECN		Alabama	W 82–76	6–14 (1–6)	15 – Cook	7 – Oquendo	4 – Cook	Stegeman Coliseum (6,703); Athens, GA
January 29, 2022; 6:00 p.m., ESPNU		at Vanderbilt	L 77–85	6–15 (1–7)	18 – Cook	9 – Baumann	4 – Cook	Memorial Gymnasium (6,887); Nashville, TN
February 2, 2022; 7:00 p.m., ESPNU		Arkansas	L 73–99	6–16 (1–8)	17 – Oquendo	7 – Baumann	6 – Cook	Stegeman Coliseum (6,448); Athens, GA
February 5, 2022; 1:00 p.m., SECN		No. 1 Auburn	L 72–74	6–17 (1–9)	25 – Oquendo	7 – Bridges	9 – Cook	Stegeman Coliseum (10,523); Athens, GA
February 9, 2022; 6:30 p.m., SECN		at Florida	L 63–72	6–18 (1–10)	22 – Oquendo	8 – Oquendo	3 – Bridges	O'Connell Center (9,929); Gainesville, FL
February 12, 2022; 1:00 p.m., SECN		South Carolina	L 68–80	6–19 (1–11)	18 – Oquendo	5 – Tied	6 – Cook	Stegeman Coliseum (6,806); Athens, GA
February 16, 2022; 7:00 p.m., SECN		at LSU	L 65–84	6–20 (1–12)	26 – Oquendo	5 – Oquendo	3 – Wright	Pete Maravich Assembly Center (9,064); Baton Rouge, LA
February 19, 2022; 1:00 p.m., SECN		Ole Miss	L 68–85	6–21 (1–13)	17 – Bridges	6 – Baumann	5 – Bridges	Stegeman Coliseum (7,380); Athens, GA
February 22, 2022; 7:00 p.m., ESPNU		at Texas A&M	L 77–91	6–22 (1–14)	33 – Oquendo	7 – Oquendo	7 – Cook	Reed Arena (5,587); College Station, TX
February 26, 2022; 12:00 p.m., ESPN2		Florida	L 72–84	6–23 (1–15)	20 – Oquendo	7 – Bridges	4 – Tied	Stegeman Coliseum (9,070); Athens, GA
March 1, 2022; 6:30 p.m., SECN		No. 13 Tennessee; Senior Day	L 68–75	6–24 (1–16)	17 – Cook	5 – Etter	5 – Wright	Stegeman Coliseum (6,139); Athens, GA
March 5, 2022; 3:30 p.m., SECN		at Missouri	L 69–79	6–25 (1–17)	19 – Bridges	5 – Bridges	1 – Tied	Mizzou Arena; Columbia, MO
SEC tournament
March 9, 2022; 8:00 p.m., SECN	(14)	vs. (11) Vanderbilt; First round	L 51–86	6–26	15 – Bridges	11 – Bridges	5 – Cook	Amalie Arena (7,121); Tampa, FL
*Non-conference game. ^{#}Rankings from AP Poll. (#) Tournament seedings in parentheses. All times are in Eastern Time.

== See also ==
- 2021–22 Georgia Lady Bulldogs basketball team
