= Adam Mazarei =

American basketball coach (born 1982)

Current position
- Title: Associate head coach
- Team: California
- Conference: ACC

Biographical details
- Born: December 13, 1982 (age 43); Ventura County, California
- Education: University of Redlands (2006)

Playing career
- 2002-2006: Redlands Bulldogs

Coaching career (HC unless noted)
- 2009–2013: Impact Basketball Academy (player development)
- 2010-2013: Moorpark (assistant)
- 2013–2016: Memphis Grizzlies (player development)
- 2016–2019: Memphis Grizzlies (assistant)
- 2019–2023: Vanderbilt (assistant)
- 2023–present: California (associate HC)

Adam Joseph Javier Mazarei (born December 13, 1982) is an American basketball coach, currently working as the associate head coach for the California Golden Bears of the Atlantic Coast Conference.

== Early life ==
Mazarei was raised by his parents Mahdi and Linda. He attended Westlake High School in Ventura County, California, where he played as a point guard for the school's basketball team.

Mazarei graduated from University of Redlands in 2006 with a major in psychology. He played basketball at Redlands under coach Gary Smith. In his senior season, he led the league in assists and led the country in all divisions of the NCAA in Assist to Turnover ratio (5:1). He holds a master's degree in athletic administration and coaching from Concordia University,

== Coaching career ==
Mazarei started coaching at his alma mater Westlake High School. He was named Ventura County Coach of the Year for all Freshman Coaches in the region.

Mazarei served as a player development coach at the IMPACT Basketball Academy in Las Vegas (2009–2013) where he helped train current NBA players such as Serge Ibaka, Kyle Lowry and Terrence Ross in addition to pre-draft rookies.

He served as an assistant and associate head coach for three years (2010–2013) at Moorpark College in California where his responsibilities included assisting and organizing all scouting, recruiting, practice and game plans as well as player development.

=== NBA ===
Mazarei served as a player development assistant for the Memphis Grizzlies from 2010 to 2013, during which time he assisted with advance and pro personnel scouting.

On start of the 2016–17 season the Grizzlies added Mazarei to their coaching staff as assistant coach.

=== College ===
On April 12, 2019, Mazarei was hired as an assistant coach for the Vanderbilt Commodores men's basketball team.

Almost exactly four years later, on April 13, 2023, Mazarei accepted an offer to be the associate head coach for the California Golden Bears of the Pac-12 Conference.

== Personal life ==
Mazarei is of half Chinese, half Iranian descent. He has two younger brothers, Amir and Matthew, who also played college basketball. Amir also attended Redlands with him and was named NCAA Division III All-American 2nd team in his senior season.
