= 2021–22 Charleston Southern Buccaneers men's basketball team =

American college basketball season

2021–22 Charleston Southern Buccaneers men's basketball
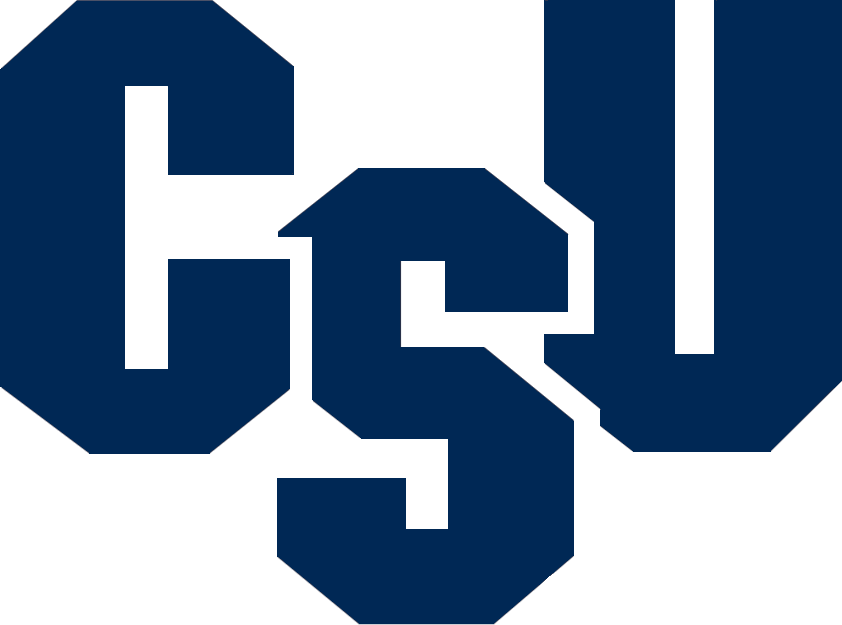
- Conference: Big South Conference
- South Division
- Record: 6–25 (1–15 Big South)
- Head coach: Barclay Radebaugh (17th season)
- Associate head coach: Thomas Butters
- Assistant coaches: Saah Nimley; Anthony White Jr.
- Home arena: Buccaneer Field House

2021–22 Big South men's basketball standings
	Conf.				Overall
Team	W		L	PCT	W		L	PCT
North
Longwood †	15	–	1	.938	26	–	7	.788
Campbell	8	–	8	.500	16	–	13	.552
High Point	7	–	9	.438	14	–	18	.438
Radford	7	–	9	.438	11	–	18	.379
North Carolina A&T	6	–	10	.375	12	–	20	.375
Hampton	5	–	11	.313	9	–	19	.321
South
Winthrop	14	–	2	.875	23	–	9	.719
Gardner–Webb	11	–	5	.688	18	–	13	.581
USC Upstate	10	–	6	.625	15	–	17	.469
UNC Asheville	8	–	8	.500	17	–	15	.531
Presbyterian	4	–	12	.250	12	–	20	.375
Charleston Southern	1	–	15	.063	6	–	25	.194
† 2022 Big South tournament winner

The 2021–22 Charleston Southern Buccaneers men's basketball team represented Charleston Southern University in the 2021–22 NCAA Division I men's basketball season. The Buccaneers, led by 17th-year head coach Barclay Radebaugh, played their home games at the Buccaneer Field House in North Charleston, South Carolina as members of the Big South Conference. With the reintroduction of divisions for the first time since the 2013–14 season, the Buccaneers played in the South division. they finished the season 6–25, 1–15 in Big South play to finish in last place in the South division. As the No. 12 seed in the Big South tournament, they defeated UNC Asheville in the first round before losing to USC Upstate in the quarterfinals.

== Previous season ==
In a season limited due to the ongoing COVID-19 pandemic, the Buccaneers finished the 2020–21 season 3–18, 2–15 in Big South play to finish in last place, before cancelling the remainder of their season on February 23, 2021 due to COVID-19 issues in the program.

== Roster ==
2021–22 Charleston Southern Buccaneers men's basketball team
Players
Coaches

Pos.	#	Name	Height	Weight	Year	Hometown
G	0	Travis Anderson	6 ft 0 in (1.83 m)	175 lb (79 kg)	RS Jr	Atlanta, GA
F	1	Kalib Clinton	6 ft 5 in (1.96 m)	205 lb (93 kg)	Fr	Jefferson, GA
G	2	Emorie Knox	6 ft 0 in (1.83 m)	170 lb (77 kg)	So	Myrtle Beach, SC
G	4	Deontaye Buskey	6 ft 1 in (1.85 m)	160 lb (73 kg)	RS Sr	Daphne, AL
G/F	10	Jamir Moore	6 ft 5 in (1.96 m)	210 lb (95 kg)	RS Jr	Miami, FL
G	11	Ja'Quavian Florence	6 ft 4 in (1.93 m)	200 lb (91 kg)	So	Atlanta, GA
G	12	Claudell Harris Jr.	6 ft 3 in (1.91 m)	190 lb (86 kg)	Fr	Hahnville, LA
G	13	Tahlik Chavez	6 ft 2 in (1.88 m)	165 lb (75 kg)	RS So	Arlington, TX
F	14	Taje' Kelly	6 ft 8 in (2.03 m)	250 lb (113 kg)	Fr	Atlanta, GA
G	15	Matt Davis	6 ft 6 in (1.98 m)	190 lb (86 kg)	Fr	Johns Creek, GA
G	20	Tyler Schaafsma	6 ft 2 in (1.88 m)	185 lb (84 kg)	Fr	Charleston, SC
F	21	Imajae Dodd	6 ft 10 in (2.08 m)	260 lb (118 kg)	Jr	Snow Hill, NC
C	22	Sadarius Bowser	6 ft 9 in (2.06 m)	230 lb (104 kg)	Sr	Gaffney, SC
G	23	Sean Price	6 ft 4 in (1.93 m)	210 lb (95 kg)	RS Sr	Port Charlotte, FL
F	24	A.J. Hamrick	6 ft 9 in (2.06 m)	190 lb (86 kg)	Fr	Charlotte, NC
G	30	Jacob Shadders	6 ft 2 in (1.88 m)	190 lb (86 kg)	Fr	Pittsford, NY
F	34	Cheikh Faye	6 ft 7 in (2.01 m)	215 lb (98 kg)	Jr	Fatick, Senegal

Head coach

- Barclay Radebaugh (East Tennessee State)

Assistant coach(es)

- Thomas Butters (Clemson)
- Saah Nimley (Charleston Southern)
- Anthony White Jr. (Mercer)

Legend

- (C) Team captain
- (S) Suspended
- (I) Ineligible
- (W) Walk-on
- Injured
- Current redshirt

Roster
Last update: December 20, 2021

== Schedule and results ==
Date time, TV	Rank^{#}	Opponent^{#}	Result	Record	Site (attendance) city, state
Non-conference regular season
November 9, 2021*; 7:00 pm, ESPN+		Johnson & Wales (NC)	W 118–71	1–0	Buccaneer Field House (423); North Charleston, SC
November 12, 2021*; 7:00 pm, SECN+/ESPN+		at Ole Miss	L 68–93	1–1	SJB Pavilion (5,825); Oxford, MS
November 17, 2021*; 7:00 pm, ACCNX/ESPN+		at Wake Forest	L 59–95	1–2	LJVM Coliseum (3,349); Winston-Salem, NC
November 20, 2021*; 3:00 pm, ESPN+		Bob Jones	W 119–63	2–2	Buccaneer Field House (564); North Charleston, SC
November 22, 2021*; 7:00 pm, ACCN		at Georgia Tech	L 70–85	2–3	McCamish Pavilion (3,912); Atlanta, GA
November 26, 2021*; 2:00 pm, ACCNX/ESPN+		at Clemson	L 59–91	2–4	Littlejohn Coliseum (5,770); Clemson, SC
November 28, 2021*; 4:00 pm, ESPN+		at Kennesaw State	L 52–89	2–5	KSU Convocation Center (742); Kennesaw, GA
December 2, 2021*; 8:00 pm, ESPN+		Jacksonville	L 56–67	2–6	Buccaneer Field House (668); North Charleston, SC
December 5, 2021*; 7:00 pm, ESPN+		at Tarleton State	W 59–57	3–6	Wisdom Gym (2,112); Stephenville, TX
December 16, 2021*; 8:00 pm, ESPN+		Tennessee State	L 75–78	3–7	Buccaneer Field House (414); North Charleston, SC
December 20, 2021*; 7:00 pm, ESPN+		vs. Manhattan; The Citadel Classic	L 75–99	3–8	McAlister Field House (912); Charleston, SC
December 21, 2021*; 5:00 pm, ESPN+		vs. South Carolina State; The Citadel Classic	L 65–75	3–9	McAlister Field House (0); Charleston, SC
January 2, 2022*; 3:00 pm, ESPN+		Toccoa Falls	Canceled due to COVID-19 issues		Buccaneer Field House; North Charleston, SC
Big South regular season
January 5, 2022; 7:00 pm, ESPN+		Gardner–Webb	L 63–88	3–10 (0–1)	Buccaneer Field House (213); North Charleston, SC
January 8, 2022; 4:30 pm, ESPN+		at UNC Asheville	L 59–82	3–11 (0–2)	Kimmel Arena (175); Asheville, NC
January 12, 2022; 7:00 pm, ESPN3		at Campbell	L 52–67	3–12 (0–3)	Gore Arena (0); Buies Creek, NC
January 15, 2022; 5:30 pm, ESPN+		Winthrop	L 65–70	3–13 (0–4)	Buccaneer Field House (711); North Charleston, SC
January 19, 2022; 7:00 pm, ESPN+		High Point	W 70–66	4–13 (1–4)	Buccaneer Field House (511); North Charleston, SC
January 22, 2022; 4:00 pm, ESPN3		at USC Upstate	L 57–70	4–14 (1–5)	G. B. Hodge Center (416); Spartanburg, SC
January 26, 2022; 7:00 pm, ESPN+		Presbyterian	L 61–62	4–15 (1–6)	Buccaneer Field House (306); North Charleston, SC
January 29, 2022; 5:30 pm, ESPN+		Hampton	L 74–78	4–16 (1–7)	Buccaneer Field House (537); North Charleston, SC
February 2, 2022; 6:30 pm, ESPN3		at Radford	L 52–64	4–17 (1–8)	Dedmon Center (1,099); Radford, VA
February 5, 2022; 5:30 pm, ESPN+		Longwood	L 67–69	4–18 (1–9)	Buccaneer Field House (682); North Charleston, SC
February 7, 2022*; 7:00 pm, ESPN+		Toccoa Falls	W 97–60	5–18	Buccaneer Field House (371); North Charleston, SC
February 9, 2022; 7:00 pm, ESPN3		at North Carolina A&T	L 51–62	5–19 (1–10)	Corbett Sports Center (2,029); Greensboro, NC
February 12, 2022; 2:00 pm, ESPN+		at Gardner–Webb	L 65–82	5–20 (1–11)	Paul Porter Arena (1,092); Boiling Springs, NC
February 16, 2022; 7:00 pm, ESPN+		UNC Asheville	L 66–85	5–21 (1–12)	Buccaneer Field House (619); North Charleston, SC
February 19, 2022; 5:30 pm, ESPN+		USC Upstate	L 73–78 ^{OT}	5–22 (1–13)	Buccaneer Field House (628); North Charleston, SC
February 23, 2022; 7:00 pm, ESPN+		at Presbyterian	L 48–68	5–23 (1–14)	Templeton Physical Education Center (462); Clinton, SC
February 26, 2022; 2:00 pm, ESPN+		at Winthrop	L 86–92	5–24 (1–15)	Winthrop Coliseum (2,378); Rock Hill, SC
Big South tournament
March 2, 2022; 2:00 pm, ESPN+	(12)	vs. (5) UNC Asheville; First round	W 79–78	6–24	Bojangles Coliseum; Charlotte, NC
March 4, 2022; 2:00 pm, ESPN+	(12)	vs. (4) USC Upstate; Quarterfinals	L 62–72	6–25	Bojangles Coliseum; Charlotte, NC
*Non-conference game. ^{#}Rankings from AP Poll. (#) Tournament seedings in parentheses. All times are in Eastern.
