= 2022 Big South Conference men's basketball tournament =

American college basketball postseason tournament

- Classification: Division I
- Season: 2021–22
- Teams: 12
- Site: Bojangles Coliseum; Charlotte, North Carolina
- Champions: Longwood (1st title)
- Winning coach: Griff Aldrich (1st title)
- MVP: Isaiah Wilkins (Longwood)
- Television: ESPN+, ESPN2

2021–22 Big South men's basketball standings
	Conf.				Overall
Team	W		L	PCT	W		L	PCT
North
Longwood †	15	–	1	.938	26	–	7	.788
Campbell	8	–	8	.500	16	–	13	.552
High Point	7	–	9	.438	14	–	18	.438
Radford	7	–	9	.438	11	–	18	.379
North Carolina A&T	6	–	10	.375	12	–	20	.375
Hampton	5	–	11	.313	9	–	19	.321
South
Winthrop	14	–	2	.875	23	–	9	.719
Gardner–Webb	11	–	5	.688	18	–	13	.581
USC Upstate	10	–	6	.625	15	–	17	.469
UNC Asheville	8	–	8	.500	17	–	15	.531
Presbyterian	4	–	12	.250	12	–	20	.375
Charleston Southern	1	–	15	.063	6	–	25	.194
† 2022 Big South tournament winner

The 2022 Big South Conference men's basketball tournament was the postseason men's basketball tournament for the Big South Conference for the 2021–22 season. It was held from March 2–6, 2022, with all tournament games played at the Bojangles Coliseum in Charlotte, North Carolina. This was the first time since the 2016 edition that the tournament was held at a single neutral site location. The tournament winner, Longwood, received the conference's automatic bid to the NCAA tournament. The defending champions were the Winthrop Eagles. Winthrop lost in the finals to Longwood, ensuring the Lancers their first NCAA tournament appearance.

== Seeds ==
With the addition of North Carolina A&T before the season, the conference increased its membership to 12 teams and split into divisions for the first time since 2013–14. The division winners were awarded the top two seeds, with the rest of the teams being seeded by record, with a tiebreaker system to seed teams with identical conference records.

The tiebreakers operate in the following order:

1. Head-to-head record.
2. Record against the top-ranked conference team not involved in the tie, going down the standings until the tie is broken. For this purpose, teams with the same conference record are considered collectively. If two teams were unbeaten or winless against an opponent but did not play the same number of games against that opponent, the tie is not considered broken.

UNC Asheville got a higher seeding than Campbell due to the head-to-head record. High Point got a higher seeding than Radford got a better top-to-bottom record through High Point's win against Winthrop.

Seed	School	Conference	NET ranking (March 2, 2021)
1	Longwood	15–1	143rd
2	Winthrop	14–2	145th
3	Gardner–Webb	11–5	163rd
4	USC Upstate	10–6	271st
5	UNC Asheville	8–8	222nd
6	Campbell	8–8	223rd
7	High Point	7–9	255th
8	Radford	7–9	288th
9	North Carolina A&T	6–10	290th
10	Hampton	5–11	321st
11	Presbyterian	4–12	270th
12	Charleston Southern	1–15	351st

== Schedule ==
Game	Time*	Matchup	Score	Channel
First round - Wednesday, March 2 Bojangles Coliseum Charlotte, NC
1	11:30 am	#8 Radford vs. #9 North Carolina A&T	71–78	ESPN+
2	2:00 pm	#5 UNC Asheville vs. #12 Charleston Southern	78–79	ESPN+
3	6:00 pm	#7 High Point vs. #10 Hampton	84–77	ESPN+
4	8:00 pm	#6 Campbell vs. #11 Presbyterian	75–72	ESPN+
Quarterfinals - Friday, March 4 Bojangles Coliseum
5	12:00 pm	#1 Longwood vs. #9 North Carolina A&T	79–65	ESPN+
6	2:00 pm	#4 USC Upstate vs.#12 Charleston Southern	72–62	ESPN+
7	6:00 pm	#2 Winthrop vs. #7 High Point	68–51	ESPN+
8	8:00 pm	#3 Gardner–Webb vs. #6 Campbell	54–53	ESPN+
Semifinals - Saturday, March 5 Bojangles Coliseum
9	12:00 pm	#1 Longwood vs. #4 USC Upstate	79–70	ESPN+
10	2:00 pm	#2 Winthrop vs. #3 Gardner-Webb	76–67	ESPN+
Championship - Sunday, March 6 Bojangles Coliseum
11	12:00 pm	#1 Longwood vs. #2 Winthrop	79–58	ESPN2
*Game times in ET

== Bracket ==
First round Wednesday, March 2 ESPN+
8	Radford	71
9	North Carolina A&T	78*
5	UNC Asheville	78
12	Charleston Southern	79
7	High Point	84*
10	Hampton	77
6	Campbell	75**
11	Presbyterian	72

Quarterfinals; Friday, March 4 ESPN+
1	Longwood	79*
9	North Carolina A&T	65
4	USC Upstate	72
12	Charleston Southern	62
2	Winthrop	68
7	High Point	51
3	Gardner–Webb	54
6	Campbell	53

Semifinals; Saturday, March 5 ESPN+
1	Longwood	79
4	USC Upstate	70
2	Winthrop	76
3	Gardner–Webb	67

Final; Sunday, March 6 ESPN2
1	Longwood	79
2	Winthrop	58

* denotes overtime period

== Game summaries ==
=== First round ===
ESPN+

March 2
11:30 a.m.

No. 8 Radford 71, No. 9 North Carolina A&T 78 (OT)
Scoring by half: 27–33, 41–19 Overtime: 11–18
Pts: Jeffers (18); Rebs: Mangum (10); Asts: Jeffers (4)	Pts: Watson (18); Rebs: Watson (11); Asts: Watson/Langley (3)

Bojangles Colisuem
Charlotte, NC

ESPN+

March 2
2:00 p.m.

No. 5 UNC Asheville 78, No. 12 Charleston Southern 79
Scoring by half: 42–36, 36–43
Pts: Thorpe (18); Rebs: Jones (8); Asts: Thorpe (5)	Pts: Kelly (24); Rebs: Kelly/Buskey (7); Asts: Buskey (6)

Bojangles Coliseum
Charlotte, NC

ESPN+

March 2
6:00 p.m.

No. 7 High Point 84, No. 10 Hampton 77 (OT)
Scoring by half: 39–32, 28–43 Overtime: 13–6
Pts: Austin (24); Rebs: Austin (16); Asts: Wright (3)	Pts: Dean (28); Rebs: Garvin (13); Asts: Dean (5)

Bojangles Coliseum
Charlotte, NC

ESPN+

March 2
8:00 p.m.

No. 6 Campbell 75, No. 11 Presbyterian 72 (OT)
Scoring by half: 31–24, 19–36 Overtime: 9–9; 11–8
Pts: Whitfield (16); Rebs: Carralero (13); Asts: Carralero (8)	Pts: Hill (20); Rebs: Hill (9); Asts: Reddish (3)

Bojangles Coliseum
Charlotte, NC
