= 2021–22 Presbyterian Blue Hose men's basketball team =

American college basketball season

2021–22 Presbyterian Blue Hose men's basketball
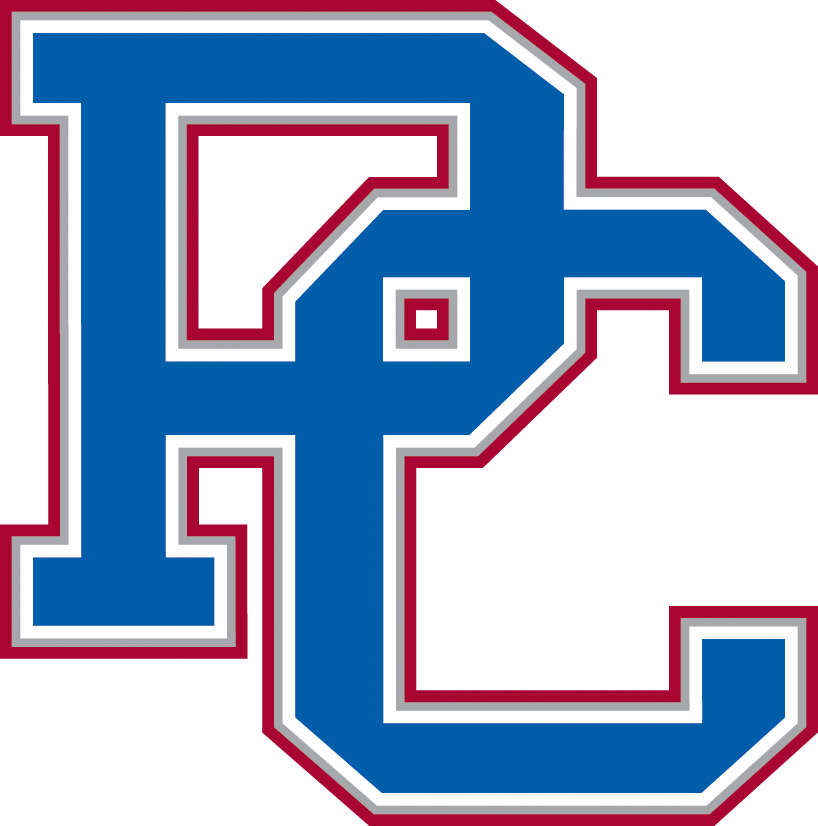
- Conference: Big South Conference
- Record: 12–20 (4–12 Big South)
- Head coach: Quinton Ferrell (3rd season)
- Assistant coaches: Tom Tankelewicz; Eric Wilson; Nick Lagroone
- Home arena: Templeton Physical Education Center

2021–22 Big South men's basketball standings
	Conf.				Overall
Team	W		L	PCT	W		L	PCT
North
Longwood †	15	–	1	.938	26	–	7	.788
Campbell	8	–	8	.500	16	–	13	.552
High Point	7	–	9	.438	14	–	18	.438
Radford	7	–	9	.438	11	–	18	.379
North Carolina A&T	6	–	10	.375	12	–	20	.375
Hampton	5	–	11	.313	9	–	19	.321
South
Winthrop	14	–	2	.875	23	–	9	.719
Gardner–Webb	11	–	5	.688	18	–	13	.581
USC Upstate	10	–	6	.625	15	–	17	.469
UNC Asheville	8	–	8	.500	17	–	15	.531
Presbyterian	4	–	12	.250	12	–	20	.375
Charleston Southern	1	–	15	.063	6	–	25	.194
† 2022 Big South tournament winner

The 2021–22 Presbyterian Blue Hose men's basketball team represented Presbyterian College during the 2021–22 NCAA Division I men's basketball season. The team was led by third-year head coach Quinton Ferrell, and played their home games at Templeton Physical Education Center in Clinton, South Carolina as members of the Big South Conference. The Hose finished the season 12–20, 4–12 in Big South play, to finish in fifth place in the South division. As the No. 11 seed in the Big South tournament, they lost to Campbell in the first round.

== Previous season ==
In a season limited due to the ongoing COVID-19 pandemic, the Blue Hose finished the 2020–21 season 7–15, 5–12 in Big South play, to finish in tenth place. They lost in the first round of the Big South tournament to Hampton.

== Roster ==
2021–22 Presbyterian Blue Hose men's basketball team
Players
Coaches

Pos.	#	Name	Height	Weight	Year	Hometown
G	0	Rayshon Harrison	6 ft 4 in (1.93 m)	180 lb (82 kg)	So	Greenville, SC
G	1	Marquis Barnett	6 ft 4 in (1.93 m)	195 lb (88 kg)	Fr	Brunswick, OH
F	2	Kirshon Thrash	6 ft 3 in (1.91 m)	215 lb (98 kg)	So	McDonough, GA
G/F	3	Kobe Stewart	6 ft 6 in (1.98 m)	180 lb (82 kg)	So	Augusta, GA
F	4	Winston Hill	6 ft 7 in (2.01 m)	230 lb (104 kg)	Sr	Columbia, SC
G	5	Zeb Graham	6 ft 1 in (1.85 m)	175 lb (79 kg)	Jr	Fort Mill, SC
G	10	James Lovorn	6 ft 0 in (1.83 m)	175 lb (79 kg)	Fr	Anderson, SC
C	11	Will Ferguson	6 ft 8 in (2.03 m)	210 lb (95 kg)	Sr	Yulee, FL
F	13	Terrell Jr. Ard	6 ft 7 in (2.01 m)	220 lb (100 kg)	RS Fr	Acworth, GA
F	15	Owen McCormack	6 ft 9 in (2.06 m)	230 lb (104 kg)	Jr	Advance, NC
F/C	21	Porter Stanley	6 ft 10 in (2.08 m)	220 lb (100 kg)	Fr	Columbia, SC
G	22	Brandon Younger	6 ft 7 in (2.01 m)	190 lb (86 kg)	Sr	Marietta, GA
G	23	Trevon Reddish-Rhone	6 ft 4 in (1.93 m)	205 lb (93 kg)	Jr	Carrollton, GA
G	24	Ambaka Le Gregam	6 ft 4 in (1.93 m)	180 lb (82 kg)	So	Nairobi, Kenya
F	33	Jack McMahon	6 ft 3 in (1.91 m)	215 lb (98 kg)	Jr	Hickory, NC

Head coach

- Quinton Ferrell (Presbyterian)

Assistant coach(es)

- Nick Lagroone (Southern Wesleyan)
- Tom Tankelewicz (Western Carolina)
- Eric Wilson (Western Carolina)

Legend

- (C) Team captain
- (S) Suspended
- (I) Ineligible
- (W) Walk-on
- Injured
- Current redshirt

Roster
Last update: January 18, 2022

== Schedule and results ==
Date time, TV	Rank^{#}	Opponent^{#}	Result	Record	Site (attendance) city, state
Non-conference regular season
November 9, 2021*; 7:00 p.m., ACCNX		at Clemson	L 53–64	0–1	Littlejohn Coliseum (6,144); Clemson, SC
November 12, 2021*; 7:00 p.m., ESPN+		VMI	W 73–72 ^{OT}	1–1	Templeton Physical Education Center (510); Clinton, SC
November 15, 2021*; 7:00 p.m., ESPN+		The Citadel	W 74–70 ^{2OT}	2–1	Templeton Physical Education Center (772); Clinton, SC
November 18, 2021*; 7:00 p.m., ESPN+		at Cincinnati	L 45–79	2–2	Fifth Third Arena (9,794); Cincinnati, OH
November 24, 2021*; 4:00 p.m.		vs. VMI; UNO Classic	W 59–54	3–2	Lakefront Arena (301); New Orleans, LA
November 25, 2021*; 2:00 p.m., ESPN+		at New Orleans; UNO Classic	W 68–66	4–2	Lakefront Arena (927); New Orleans, LA
November 26, 2021*; 4:00 p.m.		vs. Central Arkansas; UNO Classic	W 75–66	5–2	Lakefront Arena (307); New Orleans, LA
November 30, 2021*; 7:00 p.m., SECN		at No. 13 Tennessee	L 44–86	5–3	Thompson–Boling Arena (180); Knoxville, TN
December 3, 2021*; 7:00 p.m., ESPN+		Bob Jones	W 90–61	6–3	Templeton Physical Education Center (254); Clinton, SC
December 6, 2021*; 7:00 p.m., ESPN+		at Morehead State	L 66–71	6–4	Ellis Johnson Arena (1,614); Morehead, KY
December 12, 2021*; 2:00 p.m.		at College of Charleston	L 76–78	6–5	TD Arena (3,648); Charleston, SC
December 15, 2021*; 7:00 p.m., ESPN+		Carver	W 98–33	7–5	Templeton Physical Education Center (297); Clinton, SC
December 18, 2021*; 4:00 p.m., ESPN+		Wofford	L 49–76	7–6	Templeton Physical Education Center (315); Clinton, SC
December 21, 2021*; 7:00 p.m., ESPN+		at Furman	L 61–75	7–7	Timmons Arena (1,947); Greenville, SC
December 30, 2021*; 7:00 p.m., ESPN+		Truett McConnell	W 91–49	8–7	Templeton Physical Education Center (101); Clinton, SC
Big South Conference regular season
January 5, 2022; 7:00 p.m., ESPN+		at North Carolina A&T	L 57–65	8–8 (0–1)	Corbett Sports Center (821); Greensboro, NC
January 8, 2022; 4:00 p.m., ESPN+		USC Upstate	L 72–82	8–9 (0–2)	Templeton Physical Education Center (177); Clinton, SC
January 12, 2022; 7:00 p.m., ESPN3		at Gardner–Webb	L 61–64	8–10 (0–3)	Paul Porter Arena (449); Boiling Springs, NC
January 20, 2022; 7:00 p.m., ESPN+		Winthrop	L 58–60	8–11 (0–4)	Templeton Physical Education Center (713); Clinton, SC
January 22, 2022; 7:00 p.m., ESPN+		Longwood	L 70–71	8–12 (0–5)	Templeton Physical Education Center (433); Clinton, SC
January 26, 2022; 7:00 p.m., ESPN+		at Charleston Southern	W 62–61	9–12 (1–5)	Buccaneer Field House (306); North Charleston, SC
January 29, 2022; 4:00 p.m., ESPN+		UNC Asheville	L 67–68	9–13 (1–6)	Templeton Physical Education Center (594); Clinton, SC
February 2, 2022; 7:00 p.m., ESPN+		Campbell	W 64–58	10–13 (2–6)	Templeton Physical Education Center (399); Clinton, SC
February 5, 2022; 4:30 p.m., ESPN+		at Radford	W 78–70	11–13 (3–6)	Dedmon Center (1,214); Radford, VA
February 7, 2022; 7:00 p.m., ESPN+		at Hampton; Rescheduled from January 15	L 69–74	11–14 (3–7)	Hampton Convocation Center (225); Hampton, VA
February 9, 2022; 7:00 p.m., ESPN+		High Point	L 70–79	11–15 (3–8)	Templeton Physical Education Center (423); Clinton, SC
February 12, 2022; 4:30 p.m., ESPN+		at Winthrop	L 61–65	11–16 (3–9)	Winthrop Coliseum (2,006); Rock Hill, SC
February 16, 2022; 6:00 p.m., ESPN+		at USC Upstate	L 55–60	11–17 (3–10)	G. B. Hodge Center (833); Spartanburg, SC
February 19, 2022; 4:00 p.m., ESPN+		Gardner–Webb	L 68–76	11–18 (3–11)	Templeton Physical Education Center (586); Clinton, SC
February 23, 2022; 7:00 p.m., ESPN+		Charleston Southern	W 68–48	12–18 (4–11)	Templeton Physical Education Center (462); Clinton, SC
February 26, 2022; 4:30 p.m., ESPN+		at UNC Asheville	L 96–98 ^{3OT}	12–19 (4–12)	Kimmel Arena (1,691); Asheville, NC
Big South tournament
March 2, 2022; 8:00 p.m., ESPN+	(11)	vs. (6) Campbell; First round	L 72–75 ^{2OT}	12–20	Bojangles Coliseum (2,661); Charlotte, NC
*Non-conference game. ^{#}Rankings from AP poll. (#) Tournament seedings in parentheses. All times are in Eastern.
