= 2021–22 North Carolina A&T Aggies men's basketball team =

American college basketball season

2021–22 North Carolina A&T Aggies men's basketball
- Conference: Big South Conference
- Record: 12–20 (6–10 Big South)
- Head coach: Willie Jones (2nd season)
- Assistant coaches: Ahmad Dorsett; Phillip Shumpert; Sam Hunt
- Home arena: Corbett Sports Center

2021–22 Big South men's basketball standings
	Conf.				Overall
Team	W		L	PCT	W		L	PCT
North
Longwood †	15	–	1	.938	26	–	7	.788
Campbell	8	–	8	.500	16	–	13	.552
High Point	7	–	9	.438	14	–	18	.438
Radford	7	–	9	.438	11	–	18	.379
North Carolina A&T	6	–	10	.375	12	–	20	.375
Hampton	5	–	11	.313	9	–	19	.321
South
Winthrop	14	–	2	.875	23	–	9	.719
Gardner–Webb	11	–	5	.688	18	–	13	.581
USC Upstate	10	–	6	.625	15	–	17	.469
UNC Asheville	8	–	8	.500	17	–	15	.531
Presbyterian	4	–	12	.250	12	–	20	.375
Charleston Southern	1	–	15	.063	6	–	25	.194
† 2022 Big South tournament winner

The 2021–22 North Carolina A&T Aggies men's basketball team represented North Carolina Agricultural and Technical State University in the 2021–22 NCAA Division I men's basketball season. The Aggies, led by second-year head coach Willie Jones, played their home games at the Corbett Sports Center in Greensboro, North Carolina as members of the Big South Conference.

The 2021–22 season was the program's only season as a Big South member. North Carolina AT&T joined the Colonial Athletic Association on July 1, 2022.

== Previous season ==
The Aggies finished the 2020–21 season 11–10, 7–1 in Mid-Eastern Athletic Conference (MEAC) play, their last season in the conference, to finish in first place in the Southern Division. The Aggies' MEAC tournament round was cancelled.

== Roster ==
2021–22 North Carolina A&T Aggies men's basketball team
Players
Coaches

Pos.	#	Name	Height	Weight	Year	Hometown
G	0	Kyle Duke	6 ft 4 in (1.93 m)	185 lb (84 kg)	Fr	Toronto, ON
F	1	Jeremy Robinson	6 ft 5 in (1.96 m)	215 lb (98 kg)	Jr	Raleigh, NC
G	2	David Beatty	6 ft 2 in (1.88 m)	200 lb (91 kg)	GS	Philadelphia, PA
G	3	Demetric Horton	6 ft 5 in (1.96 m)	200 lb (91 kg)	Jr	Raleigh, NC
G	4	Marcus Watson	6 ft 6 in (1.98 m)	235 lb (107 kg)	RS So	Buford, GA
G	5	Milton Matthews	6 ft 3 in (1.91 m)	185 lb (84 kg)	So	District Heights, MD
G	10	Justin Brooks	6 ft 1 in (1.85 m)	185 lb (84 kg)	So	Auburn, AL
G	11	Tyler Maye	6 ft 1 in (1.85 m)	180 lb (82 kg)	GS	Farmville, NC
F	12	Justin Whatley	6 ft 9 in (2.06 m)	230 lb (104 kg)	GS	Chesapeake, VA
G	13	Kameron Langley	6 ft 2 in (1.88 m)	165 lb (75 kg)	GS	High Point, NC
C	14	Harry Morrice	6 ft 11 in (2.11 m)	235 lb (107 kg)	Jr	Warrington, England
G	15	Trey Crews	6 ft 1 in (1.85 m)	150 lb (68 kg)	RS Fr	Durham, NC
G	20	Chase McDuffie	6 ft 5 in (1.96 m)	210 lb (95 kg)	Fr	Columbia, SC
G	23	Ahmad Hamilton	6 ft 2 in (1.88 m)	170 lb (77 kg)	RS Fr	Durham, NC
F	24	Jaylen Jackson	6 ft 6 in (1.98 m)	190 lb (86 kg)	Fr	Atlanta, GA
F	25	Webster Filmore	6 ft 7 in (2.01 m)	225 lb (102 kg)	Sr	Charlotte, NC
F	31	Duncan Powell	6 ft 8 in (2.03 m)	225 lb (102 kg)	Fr	Dallas, TX
G	33	Jibril McCormick	6 ft 7 in (2.01 m)	180 lb (82 kg)	Jr	Charlotte, NC
F	35	Collin Smith	6 ft 11 in (2.11 m)	225 lb (102 kg)	GS	Jacksonville, FL

Head coach

- Willie Jones (South Carolina State)

Assistant coach(es)

- Ahmad Dorsett (George Mason)
- Phillip Shumpert (US Sports Academy)
- Sam Hunt (NC State)

Legend

- (C) Team captain
- (S) Suspended
- (I) Ineligible
- (W) Walk-on
- Injured
- Current redshirt

Roster
Last update: January 17, 2022

== Schedule and results ==
Date time, TV	Rank^{#}	Opponent^{#}	Result	Record	Site (attendance) city, state
Regular season
November 9, 2021*; 7:00 p.m., ESPN+		at UNC Greensboro	L 53–57	0–1	Greensboro Coliseum Complex (6,288); Greensboro, NC
November 13, 2021*; 2:00 p.m., ESPN+		at Jacksonville	L 54–63	0–2	Swisher Gymnasium (1,015); Jacksonville, FL
November 15, 2021*; 7:00 p.m., ESPN+		at South Florida	L 54–56	0–3	Yuengling Center (1,931); Tampa, FL
November 18, 2021*; 6:00 p.m., ESPN+		Greensboro College	W 77–69	1–3	Corbett Sports Center (3,045); Greensboro, NC
November 20, 2021*; 4:00 p.m., ACCNX/ESPN+		at Wake Forest	L 63–87	1–4	LJVM Coliseum (3,470); Winston-Salem, NC
November 23, 2021*; 10:00 p.m., P12N		at Stanford	L 65–79	1–5	Maples Pavilion (2,379); Stanford, CA
November 26, 2021*; 2:30 p.m.		vs. Samford; Emerald Coast Classic	L 75–77	1–6	Raider Arena (200); Niceville, FL
November 27, 2021*; 11:00 a.m.		vs. St. Francis Brooklyn; Emerald Coast Classic	W 73–67	2–6	Raider Arena (100); Niceville, FL
December 3, 2021*; 6:00 p.m., ESPN+		Carver College	W 97–55	3–6	Corbett Sports Center (675); Greensboro, NC
December 7, 2021*; 7:00 p.m., ESPN+		at East Carolina	L 71–82	3–7	Williams Arena (3,859); Greenville, NC
December 11, 2021*; 2:00 p.m., ESPN+		at UCF	L 68–83	3–8	Addition Financial Arena (3,507); Orlando, FL
December 14, 2021*; 7:00 p.m., ESPN+		at East Tennessee State	W 69–67	4–8	Freedom Hall Civic Center (2,789); Johnson City, TN
December 18, 2021*; 4:00 p.m., TNT		vs. Howard; Invesco QQQ Legacy Classic	L 57–79	4–9	Prudential Center; Newark, NJ
December 21, 2021*; 5:00 p.m., ESPN+		Mid-Atlantic Christian	W 88–63	5–9	Corbett Sports Center (356); Greensboro, NC
Big South Conference regular season
January 5, 2022; 7:00 p.m., ESPN+		Presbyterian	W 65–57	6–9 (1–0)	Corbett Sports Center (821); Greensboro, NC
January 8, 2022; 4:30 p.m., ESPN+		at Radford	W 73–72	7–9 (2–0)	Dedmon Center (910); Radford, VA
January 12, 2022; 7:00 p.m., ESPN+		Hampton	W 67–59	8–9 (3–0)	Corbett Sports Center (3,092); Greensboro, NC
January 15, 2022; 7:00 p.m., ESPN3		at High Point	L 71–78	8–10 (3–1)	Qubein Center (3,375); High Point, NC
January 19, 2022; 6:30 p.m., ESPN+		at UNC Asheville	W 73–71	9–10 (4–1)	Kimmel Arena (441); Asheville, NC
January 22, 2022; 5:00 p.m., ESPN+		Campbell	L 72–73	9–11 (4–2)	Corbett Sports Center (3,523); Greensboro, NC
January 26, 2022; 7:00 p.m., ESPN3		at Longwood	L 71–79	9–12 (4–3)	Willett Hall (1,600); Farmville, VA
January 29, 2022; 4:00 p.m., ESPN+		USC Upstate	L 64–84	9–13 (4–4)	Corbett Sports Center (4,059); Greensboro, NC
February 2, 2022; 7:00 p.m., ESPN3		at Winthrop	L 54–64	9–14 (4–5)	Winthrop Coliseum (2,192); Rock Hill, SC
February 5, 2022; 2:00 p.m., ESPN+		at Gardner–Webb	L 62–69	9–15 (4–6)	Paul Porter Arena (943); Boiling Springs, NC
February 9, 2022; 7:00 p.m., ESPN3		Charleston Southern	W 62–51	10–15 (5–6)	Corbett Sports Center (2,029); Greensboro, NC
February 12, 2022; 4:00 p.m., ESPN+		Longwood	W 70–62	11–15 (6–6)	Corbett Sports Center (1,778); Greensboro, NC
February 16, 2022; 7:00 p.m., ESPN+		at Hampton	L 82–93	11–16 (6–7)	Hampton Convocation Center (456); Hampton, VA
February 19, 2022; 4:30 p.m., ESPN+		at Campbell	L 63–64	11–17 (6–8)	Gore Arena (1,960); Buies Creek, NC
February 23, 2022; 7:00 p.m., ESPN+		High Point	L 58–78	11–18 (6–9)	Corbett Sports Center (2,815); Greensboro, NC
February 26, 2022; 5:00 p.m., ESPN+		Radford	L 53–62	11–19 (6–10)	Corbett Sports Center (3,886); Greensboro, NC
Big South tournament
March 2, 2022; 11:30 a.m., ESPN+	(9)	vs. (8) Radford; First round	W 78–71 ^{OT}	12–19	Bojangles Coliseum (0); Charlotte, NC
March 4, 2022; 12:00 p.m., ESPN+	(9)	vs. (1) Longwood; Quarterfinals	L 65–79	12–20	Bojangles Coliseum; Charlotte, NC
*Non-conference game. ^{#}Rankings from AP poll. (#) Tournament seedings in parentheses. All times are in Eastern.
