= 2021–22 Longwood Lancers men's basketball team =

American college basketball season

2021–22 Longwood Lancers men's basketball

Big South regular-season, North division and tournament champions

NCAA tournament, first round
- Conference: Big South Conference
- North Division
- Record: 26–7 (15–1 Big South)
- Head coach: Griff Aldrich (4th season)
- Assistant coaches: Marty McGillan; Cody Anderson; Ronnie Thomas
- Home arena: Willett Hall

2021–22 Big South men's basketball standings
	Conf.				Overall
Team	W		L	PCT	W		L	PCT
North
Longwood †	15	–	1	.938	26	–	7	.788
Campbell	8	–	8	.500	16	–	13	.552
High Point	7	–	9	.438	14	–	18	.438
Radford	7	–	9	.438	11	–	18	.379
North Carolina A&T	6	–	10	.375	12	–	20	.375
Hampton	5	–	11	.313	9	–	19	.321
South
Winthrop	14	–	2	.875	23	–	9	.719
Gardner–Webb	11	–	5	.688	18	–	13	.581
USC Upstate	10	–	6	.625	15	–	17	.469
UNC Asheville	8	–	8	.500	17	–	15	.531
Presbyterian	4	–	12	.250	12	–	20	.375
Charleston Southern	1	–	15	.063	6	–	25	.194
† 2022 Big South tournament winner

The 2021–22 Longwood Lancers men's basketball team represented Longwood University in the 2021–22 NCAA Division I men's basketball season. The Lancers, led by fourth-year head coach Griff Aldrich, played their home games at Willett Hall in Farmville, Virginia as members of the Big South Conference. With the reintroduction of divisions for the first time since the 2013–14 season, the Lancers played in the North division.

The Lancers finished the season 23–6, 15–1 in Big South play, to win the Big South regular-season championship. They defeated North Carolina A&T, USC Upstate and Winthrop to win the Big South tournament championship. As a result, the Lancers received the conference's automatic bid to the NCAA tournament, the school's first-ever trip to the tournament, as the No. 14 seed in the South Region, where they lost in the first round to Tennessee.

== Previous season ==
In a season limited due to the ongoing COVID-19 pandemic, the Lancers finished the 2020–21 season 12–17, 10–10 in Big South play, to finish in a three-way tie for fifth place. They defeated UNC Asheville in the quarterfinals of the Big South tournament, before falling to top-seeded Winthrop in the semifinals. They received an invitation to the College Basketball Invitational tournament, where they lost to Pepperdine in the quarterfinals.

== Roster ==
2021–22 Longwood Lancers men's basketball team
Players
Coaches

Pos.	#	Name	Height	Weight	Year	Hometown
F	0	Leslie Nkereuwem	6 ft 7 in (2.01 m)	225 lb (102 kg)	Jr	Lawrenceville, GA
G	1	Isaiah Wilkins	6 ft 4 in (1.93 m)	220 lb (100 kg)	Sr	Winston-Salem, NC
G	2	Nate Lliteras	6 ft 7 in (2.01 m)	210 lb (95 kg)	So	Seward, NE
G	3	DeShaun Wade	6 ft 2 in (1.88 m)	200 lb (91 kg)	Sr	Virginia Beach, VA
F	4	Zac Watson	6 ft 7 in (2.01 m)	215 lb (98 kg)	Sr	Plano, TX
G	5	Jaylani Darden	6 ft 5 in (1.96 m)	185 lb (84 kg)	Fr	Norfolk, VA
G	10	Justin Hill	6 ft 0 in (1.83 m)	185 lb (84 kg)	So	Houston, TX
G	11	Jordan Perkins	6 ft 1 in (1.85 m)	190 lb (86 kg)	GS	Greensboro, NC
F	13	Prosper Obidiebube	6 ft 7 in (2.01 m)	210 lb (95 kg)	Jr	Houston, TX
F	21	Trey Hicks	6 ft 8 in (2.03 m)	—	Fr	Louisville, KY
G	22	Ga'Khari LaCount	6 ft 1 in (1.85 m)	175 lb (79 kg)	Fr	Miami, FL
G	23	DA Houston	6 ft 1 in (1.85 m)	212 lb (96 kg)	So	Houston, TX
G	24	Cameron O'Conner	6 ft 5 in (1.96 m)	185 lb (84 kg)	Jr	Roanoke, VA
F	25	Michael Christmas	6 ft 6 in (1.98 m)	225 lb (102 kg)	Jr	Virginia Beach, VA
F	35	Jesper Granlund	6 ft 6 in (1.98 m)	210 lb (95 kg)	So	Helsinki, Finland
G	44	C.J. Williams	6 ft 0 in (1.83 m)	180 lb (82 kg)	RS Sr	Chester, VA

Head coach

- Griff Aldrich (Hampden–Sydney)

Assistant coach(es)

- Marty McGillan (UNC Wilmington)
- Cody Anderson (Georgia)
- Ronnie Thomas (Bridgewater)

Legend

- (C) Team captain
- (S) Suspended
- (I) Ineligible
- (W) Walk-on
- Injured
- Current redshirt

Roster
Last update: November 1, 2021

== Schedule and results ==
Date time, TV	Rank^{#}	Opponent^{#}	Result	Record	High points	High rebounds	High assists	Site (attendance) city, state
Non-conference regular season
November 9, 2021*; 9:00 p.m., BTN+		at Iowa	L 73–106	0–1	19 – Wilkins	8 – Wilkins	6 – tied	Carver–Hawkeye Arena (9,259); Iowa City, IA
November 12, 2021*; 7:00 p.m., ESPN+		Virginia–Lynchburg	W 80–46	1–1	19 – Wilkins	10 – tied	7 – Houston	Willett Hall (1,418); Farmville, VA
November 14, 2021*; 3:00 p.m., ESPN+		Mid-Atlantic Christian	W 93–47	2–1	14 – Watson	10 – Hill	9 – Hill	Willett Hall (1,208); Farmville, VA
November 19, 2021*; 5:30 p.m., ESPN+		American	W 82–42	3–1	15 – Nkereuwem	5 – Wilkins	6 – Hill	Willett Hall (1,340); Farmville, VA
November 20, 2021*; 6:00 p.m., ESPN+		UMBC	W 82–55	4–1	15 – Wilkins	7 – Houston	3 – Perkins	Willett Hall (1,512); Farmville, VA
November 21, 2021*; 3:30 p.m., ESPN+		Western Carolina	L 53–64	4–2	17 – Nkereuwem	9 – Wilkins	3 – Hill	Willett Hall (1,518); Farmville, VA
November 26, 2021*; 4:00 p.m.		at Old Dominion	L 61–62	4–3	14 – Hill	4 – Wilkins	2 – Hill	Chartway Arena (4,275); Norfolk, VA
November 30, 2021*; 7:00 p.m., FS2		at Georgetown	L 83–91	4–4	21 – Wade	7 – Watson	4 – Perkins	Capital One Arena (2,732); Washington, D.C.
December 4, 2021*; 3:00 p.m., ESPN+		Delaware State	W 78–58	5–4	17 – Wilkins	7 – Lliteras	6 – Hill	Willett Hall (1,265); Farmville, VA
December 11, 2021*; 3:00 p.m., ESPN+		Morgan State	W 93–55	6–4	21 – Hill	8 – Lliteras	5 – Hill	Willett Hall (944); Farmville, VA
December 14, 2021*; 7:00 p.m., ESPN+		Carolina	W 98–56	7–4	17 – Nkereuwem	6 – Darden	4 – Perkins	Willett Hall (612); Farmville, VA
December 19, 2021*; 12:30 p.m., ESPN+		at St. Francis Brooklyn	Canceled due to COVID-19 issues					Daniel Lynch Gymnasium; Brooklyn, NY
December 22, 2021*; 7:00 p.m., ESPN+		at Abilene Christian	L 58–74	7–5	10 – Houston	7 – Houston	2 – Houston	Teague Special Events Center (474); Abilene, TX
December 30, 2021*; 7:00 p.m., ESPN+		at Maryland Eastern Shore	Canceled due to COVID-19 issues					Hytche Athletic Center; Princess Anne, MD
January 5, 2022*; 3:00 p.m., ESPN+		Pfeiffer	W 109–69	8–5	21 – Wilkins	6 – Granlund	3 – Hill	Willett Hall (120); Farmville, VA
Big South regular season
January 12, 2022; 6:30 p.m., ESPN+		at Radford	W 83–75 ^{OT}	9–5 (1–0)	24 – Hill	9 – Wilkins	4 – Hill	Dedmon Center (1,064); Radford, VA
January 15, 2022; 3:00 p.m., ESPN+		Gardner–Webb	W 66–60	10–5 (2–0)	20 – Wilkins	8 – Wilkins	4 – Hill	Willett Hall (1,225); Farmville, VA
January 19, 2022; 7:00 p.m., ESPN+		Campbell	W 72–64	11–5 (3–0)	14 – Perkins	6 – Wilkins	6 – Hill	Willett Hall (1,650); Farmville, VA
January 22, 2022; 4:00 p.m., ESPN+		at Presbyterian	W 71–70	12–5 (4–0)	23 – Hill	5 – Wilkins	2 – Hill	Templeton Physical Education Center (433); Clinton, SC
January 24, 2022; 6:00 p.m., ESPN+		at Hampton; Rescheduled from January 5	W 73–49	13–5 (5–0)	20 – Hill	6 – Wilkins	2 – Wilkins	Hampton Convocation Center (2,120); Hampton, VA
January 26, 2022; 7:00 p.m., ESPN3		North Carolina A&T	W 79–71	14–5 (6–0)	24 – Nkereuwem	5 – tied	6 – Hill	Willett Hall (1,600); Farmville, VA
January 29, 2022; 3:00 p.m., ESPN+		Winthrop	W 92–88	15–5 (7–0)	29 – Hill	7 – Hill	8 – Perkins	Willett Hall (1,900); Farmville, VA
February 2, 2022; 6:30 p.m., ESPN3		at UNC Asheville	W 56–48	16–5 (8–0)	17 – Wade	9 – Lliteras	5 – Hill	Kimmel Arena (507); Asheville, NC
February 5, 2022; 5:30 p.m., ESPN+		at Charleston Southern	W 69–67	17–5 (9–0)	19 – Wade	7 – Lliteras	6 – Perkins	Buccaneer Field House (682); North Charleston, SC
February 9, 2022; 7:00 p.m., ESPNU		USC Upstate	W 85–72	18–5 (10–0)	23 – Wade	7 – Lliteras	6 – Perkins	Willett Hall (1,900); Farmville, VA
February 12, 2022; 7:00 p.m., ESPN+		at North Carolina A&T	L 62–70	18–6 (10–1)	16 – Hill	5 – Wade	3 – Perkins	Corbett Sports Center (1,778); Greensboro, NC
February 15, 2022; 6:00 p.m., ESPN+		High Point; Rescheduled from January 8	W 70–66	19–6 (11–1)	15 – Hill	5 – tied	4 – Perkins	Willett Hall (1,308); Farmville, VA
February 17, 2022; 9:00 p.m., ESPNU		at High Point	W 78–71	20–6 (12–1)	18 – Hill	10 – Hill	5 – Hill	Qubein Center (5,647); High Point, NC
February 19, 2022; 3:00 p.m., ESPN+		Hampton	W 76–72	21–6 (13–1)	25 – Wilkins	9 – Wilkins	5 – Hill	Willett Hall (1,814); Farmville, VA
February 23, 2022; 7:00 p.m., ESPN+		Radford	W 71–66	22–6 (14–1)	18 – Hill	5 – Wilkins	4 – tied	Willett Hall (1,900); Farmville, VA
February 26, 2022; 4:30 p.m., ESPN3		at Campbell	W 60–55	23–6 (15–1)	20 – Wade	10 – Wilkins	5 – Hill	Gore Arena (1,563); Buies Creek, NC
Big South tournament
March 4, 2022; 12:00 p.m., ESPN+	(1)	vs. (9) North Carolina A&T; Quarterfinals	W 79–65 ^{OT}	24–6	24 – Hill	12 – Wilkins	5 – Hill	Bojangles Coliseum; Charlotte, NC
March 5, 2022; 12:00 p.m., ESPN+	(1)	vs. (4) USC Upstate; Semifinals	W 79–70	25–6	18 – tied	9 – Nkereuwem	9 – Hill	Bojangles Coliseum; Charlotte, NC
March 6, 2022; 12:00 p.m., ESPN2	(1)	vs. (2) Winthrop; Championship	W 79–58	26–6	19 – Wilkins	8 – tied	5 – Hill	Bojangles Coliseum; Charlotte, NC
NCAA tournament
March 17, 2022; 2:45 p.m., CBS	(14 S)	vs. (3 S) No. 5 Tennessee; First round	L 56–88	26–7	13 – Hill	4 – Perkins	4 – Perkins	Gainbridge Fieldhouse (15,782); Indianapolis, IN
*Non-conference game. ^{#}Rankings from AP poll. (#) Tournament seedings in parentheses. All times are in Eastern.
