= 2021–22 Big South Conference men's basketball season =

- League: NCAA Division I
- Sport: Basketball
- Teams: 12

Regular Season

2022 Big South tournament

Seasons
- ← 2020-21 2022-23 →

2021–22 Big South men's basketball standings
	Conf.				Overall
Team	W		L	PCT	W		L	PCT
North
Longwood †	15	–	1	.938	26	–	7	.788
Campbell	8	–	8	.500	16	–	13	.552
High Point	7	–	9	.438	14	–	18	.438
Radford	7	–	9	.438	11	–	18	.379
North Carolina A&T	6	–	10	.375	12	–	20	.375
Hampton	5	–	11	.313	9	–	19	.321
South
Winthrop	14	–	2	.875	23	–	9	.719
Gardner–Webb	11	–	5	.688	18	–	13	.581
USC Upstate	10	–	6	.625	15	–	17	.469
UNC Asheville	8	–	8	.500	17	–	15	.531
Presbyterian	4	–	12	.250	12	–	20	.375
Charleston Southern	1	–	15	.063	6	–	25	.194
† 2022 Big South tournament winner

The 2021–22 Big South Conference men's basketball season started non-conference play on November 9, 2021, and began conference play on January 5, 2022. The regular season ended on February 26, 2022, setting up the 2021–22 Big South Conference men's basketball tournament from March 2 to March 6.

== Conference changes ==
Due the offseason addition of the North Carolina A&T Aggies the Big South changed the conference play format. The conference was split into a north and south division. The north included Campbell, Hampton, High Point, Longwood, North Carolina A&T and Radford while the south consisted of Charleston Southern, Gardner-Webb, Presbyterian, UNC Asheville, USC Upstate and Winthrop. Conference play consisted of 96 total games with each team playing 16 games. Each team played 10 intra-division games and 6 cross-division games. The first 11 games of conference play consisted of 5 intra-division games and 6 cross-division games, while the last five games were all intra-division.

== Head coaches ==
=== Coach Changes ===
Radford hired Darris Nichols to replace Mike Jones who left for UNC Greensboro to become head coach.

Winthrop hired Mark Prosser to replace Pat Kelsey who left for College of Charleston to become head coach.

=== Coaches ===
Team	Head coach	Previous Job	Years At School	Record at School	Big South Record	Big South Titles	NCAA Tournaments
Campbell	Kevin McGeehan	Richmond (Associate HC)	10	123-133	60-79	0	0
Charleston Southern	Barclay Radebaugh	Miami (FL) (Assistant)	17	210-274	114-157	0	0
Gardner-Webb	Tim Craft	East Carolina (Assistant)	9	138-121	81-61	1	1
Hampton	Edward Joyner	Hampton (Assistant)	13	197-190	26-26	0	3
High Point	Tubby Smith	Memphis	4	34-53	21-30	0	0
Longwood	Griff Aldrich	UMBC (Director of Recruiting)	4	42-53	24-30	0	0
North Carolina A&T	Willie Jones	North Carolina A&T (Interim HC)	3	25-15	0-0	0	0
Presbyterian	Quinton Ferrell	College of Charleston (Assistant)	3	17-37	12-23	0	0
Radford	Darris Nichols	Florida (Assistant)	1	0-0	0-0	0	0
UNC Asheville	Mike Morrell	Texas (Assistant)	4	29-53	19-29	0	0
USC Upstate	Dave Dickerson	Ohio State (Associate HC)	4	24-64	13-37	0	0
Winthrop Eagles	Mark Prosser	Western Carolina	1	0-0	0-0	0	0

Notes:

- Year at school includes 2021–22 season.
- Overall and Big South records are from the time at current school and are through the end of the 2020–21 season.
- NCAA Tournament appearances are from the time at current school only.

== Preseason Awards ==
The Preseason Big South men's basketball poll was released on October 20, 2021.

=== Preseason men's basketball polls ===
==== North ====
First Place Votes in Parentheses

1. Campbell (20) - 148
2. Longwood - 96
3. North Carolina A&T (3) - 92
4. Radford (3) - 83
5. Hampton - 70
6. High Point - 57

==== South ====
First Place Votes in Parentheses

1. Winthrop (23) - 152
2. UNC Ashville (3) - 131
3. Gardner-Webb - 103
4. Presbyterian College - 72
5. Charleston Southern - 47
6. USC Upstate - 41

=== Preseason Honors ===
Honor	Recipient
Preseason Player of the Year	D. J. Burns, Winthrop
Preseason All-Big South First Team	D. J. Burns, Winthrop
Preseason All-Big South First Team	John-Michael Wright, High Point
Preseason All-Big South First Team	Cedric Henderson Jr., Campbell
Preseason All-Big South First Team	Tajion Jones, UNC Asheville
Preseason All-Big South First Team	Rayshon Harrison, Presbyterian College
Preseason All-Big South Second Team	Kameron Langley, North Carolina A&T
Preseason All-Big South Second Team	Jordan Whitfield, Campbell
Preseason All-Big South Second Team	LJ Thorpe, UNC Asheville
Preseason All-Big South Second Team	Russell Dean, Hampton
Preseason All-Big South Second Team	Justin Hill, Longwood

== Regular season ==
=== Conference standings ===
North Division		Conference		Division		Overall		
Rank	Team	Record	Percent	Record	Percent	Record	Percent	Tiebreaker
1	Longwood	4-0	1.000	2-0	1.000	12-5	.706	
2	North Carolina A&T	4-2	.667	2-2	.500	9-11	.450	
3	Campbell	3-3	.500	2-1	.667	10-7	.588	
4	Radford	2-4	.333	1-3	.250	6-12	.333	
5	Hampton	1-3	.250	1-2	.333	5-10	.333	Ahead of High Point based on Head-to-Head Win %
6	High Point	1-3	.250	1-1	.500	7-11	.412	

South Division		Conference		Division		Overall		
Rank	Team	Record	Percent	Record	Percent	Record	Percent	Tiebreaker
1	Winthrop	5-0	1.000	4-0	1.000	12-6	.667	
2	USC Upstate	5-1	.833	4-0	1.000	8-10	.444	
3	Gardner-Webb	3-3	.500	2-2	.500	9-10	.474	Ahead of UNC Ashville based on Division Win %
4	UNC Ashville	3-3	.500	1-2	.333	11-8	.579	
5	Charleston Southern	1-5	.167	0-3	.000	4-14	.222	
6	Presbyterian	0-5	.000	0-4	.000	8-12	.400	

Combined Divisions		Conference		Overall		
Rank	Team	Record	Percent	Record	Percent	Tiebreaker
1	Winthrop	5-0	1.000	12-6	.667	
2	Longwood	3-0	1.000	12-5	.706	
3	USC Upstate	5-1	.833	8-10	.444	
4	North Carolina A&T	4-2	.667	9-11	.450	
5	UNC Ashville	3-3	.500	11-8	.579	Ahead of Gardner-Webb and Campbell based on Win % between 3-3 teams
6	Gardner-Webb	3-3	.500	9-10	.474	Ahead of Campbell based on Win % between 3-3 teams
7	Campbell	3-3	.500	10-7	.588	
8	Radford	2-4	.333	6-12	.333	
9	Hampton	1-3	.250	5-10	.333	
10	High Point	1-3	.250	7-11	.412	
11	Charleston Southern	1-5	.167	4-14	.222	
12	Presbyterian	0-5	.000	8-12	.400	

=== Conference Matrix ===
	Campbell	Charleston Southern	Gardner–Webb	Hampton	High Point	Longwood	North Carolina A&T	Presbyterian	Radford	UNC Asheville	USC Upstate	Winthrop
vs. Campbell	–	0-1				1-0	0-1		0-1	1-0		1-0
vs. Charleston Southern	1-0	–	1-0		0-1					1-0	1-0	1-0
vs. Gardner-Webb		0-1	–	0-1		1-0		0-1			1-0	1-0
vs. Hampton			1-0	–	0-1		1-0		1-0			
vs. High Point		1-0		1-0	–		0-1				1-0	
vs. Longwood	0-1		0-1			–		0-1	0-1			
vs. North Carolina A&T	1-0			0-1	1-0		–	0-1	0-1	0-1		
vs. Presbyterian			1-0			1-0	1-0	–			1-0	1-0
vs. Radford	1-0			0-1		1-0	1-0		–	1-0	0-1	
vs. UNC Asheville	0-1	0-1					1-0		0-1	–	1-0	1-0
vs. USC Upstate		0-1	0-1		0-1			0-1	1-0	0-1	–	
vs. Winthrop	0-1	0-1	0-1					0-1		0-1		−

=== Players of the Week ===
Week	Player(s) of the Week	School	Freshman of the Week	School
Nov. 15	Ricky Clemens	Campbell	Jordan Gainey	USC Upstate
Nov. 22	Leslie Nkereuwem	Longwood	Zack Austin	High Point
Nov. 29	Patrick Good; Rayshon Harrison	Winthrop; Presbyterian	Jordan Gainey (2)	USC Upstate (2)
Dec. 6	John-Michael Wright	High Point	Zack Austin (2)	High Point (2)
Dec. 13	Drew Pember	UNC Ashville	Zack Austin (3)	High Point (3)
Dec. 20	Drew Pember (2)	UNC Ashville (2)	Jalen Breazeale	USC Upstate (3)
Dec. 27	D. J. Burns	Winthrop (2)	Zack Austin (4)	High Point (4)
Jan. 3	Zion Williams	Gardner-Webb	Zack Austin (5)	High Point (5)
Jan. 10	Anthony Seldon	Gardner-Webb (2)	Jordan Gainey (3)	USC Upstate (4)
Jan. 17	Isaiah Wilkins	Longwood (2)	Jordan Gainey (4)	USC Upstate (5)
Jan. 24	Drew Pember (3)	UNC Ashville (3)	Jordan Gainey (5)	USC Upstate (6)
Jan. 31	Justin Hill; Dalvin White	Longwood (3); USC Upstate	Jordan Gainey (6)	USC Upstate (7)
Feb. 7	D. J. Burns (2)	Winthrop (3)	Zack Austin (6)	High Point (6)
Feb. 14	Kameron Langley	North Carolina A&T	Zack Austin (7)	High Point (7)
Feb. 21	Isaiah Wilkins (2)	Longwood (4)	Jordan Gainey (7)	USC Upstate (8)
Feb. 27	Justin Hill (2)	Longwood (5)	Zack Austin (8)	High Point (8)

=== Records against other conferences ===
Power 7 Conferences	Record	Power 7 Conferences	Record
ACC	0-12	American	0-6
Big East	0-1	Big Ten	0-3
Big 12	0-1	Pac-12	1-2
SEC	1-8	Power 7 Total	2-33
Other Division I Conferences	Record	Other Division I Conferences	Record
America East	3-0	Atlantic 10	0-3
ASUN	3-3	Big Sky	None
Big West	None	Colonial	3-7
Conference USA	2-4	Horizon League	None
Ivy League	None	MAAC	0-1
MAC	0-1	MEAC	8-7
MVC	None	MWC	0-1
NEC	1-0	OVC	1-3
Patriot League	1-2	SoCon	10-15
Southland	1-0	SWAC	None
Summit League	None	Sun Belt	0-4
WAC	1-1	WCC	None
Other Division I Total			34-52
NCAA Division I Total			36-84
NCAA Division II Total			5-0
NCAA Division III Total			8-0
NAIA Total			7-0
NCCAA Total			9-0
USCAA Total			4-0
Total Non-Conference Record			69-85

== Conference tournament ==
The 2022 Hercules Tire Big South tournament was held at Bojangles Coliseum in Charlotte, North Carolina from March 2 to March 6.

First round Wednesday, March 2 ESPN+
8	Radford	71
9	North Carolina A&T	78*
5	UNC Asheville	78
12	Charleston Southern	79
7	High Point	84*
10	Hampton	77
6	Campbell	75**
11	Presbyterian	72

Quarterfinals; Friday, March 4 ESPN+
1	Longwood	79*
9	North Carolina A&T	65
4	USC Upstate	72
12	Charleston Southern	62
2	Winthrop	68
7	High Point	51
3	Gardner–Webb	54
6	Campbell	53

Semifinals; Saturday, March 5 ESPN+
1	Longwood	79
4	USC Upstate	70
2	Winthrop	76
3	Gardner–Webb	67

Final; Sunday, March 6 ESPN2
1	Longwood	79
2	Winthrop	58
