= 2021–22 USC Upstate Spartans men's basketball team =

American college basketball season

2021–22 USC Upstate Spartans men's basketball

The Basketball Classic, second round
- Conference: Big South Conference
- South Division
- Record: 15–17 (10–6 Big South)
- Head coach: Dave Dickerson (4th season)
- Assistant coaches: Stacey Palmore; Andrew Garcia; Anthony Johnson
- Home arena: G. B. Hodge Center

2021–22 Big South men's basketball standings
	Conf.				Overall
Team	W		L	PCT	W		L	PCT
North
Longwood †	15	–	1	.938	26	–	7	.788
Campbell	8	–	8	.500	16	–	13	.552
High Point	7	–	9	.438	14	–	18	.438
Radford	7	–	9	.438	11	–	18	.379
North Carolina A&T	6	–	10	.375	12	–	20	.375
Hampton	5	–	11	.313	9	–	19	.321
South
Winthrop	14	–	2	.875	23	–	9	.719
Gardner–Webb	11	–	5	.688	18	–	13	.581
USC Upstate	10	–	6	.625	15	–	17	.469
UNC Asheville	8	–	8	.500	17	–	15	.531
Presbyterian	4	–	12	.250	12	–	20	.375
Charleston Southern	1	–	15	.063	6	–	25	.194
† 2022 Big South tournament winner

The 2021–22 USC Upstate Spartans men's basketball team represented the University of South Carolina Upstate in the 2021–22 NCAA Division I men's basketball season. The Spartans, led by fourth-year head coach Dave Dickerson, played their home games at the G. B. Hodge Center in Spartanburg, South Carolina as members of the Big South Conference. With the reintroduction of divisions for the first time since the 2013–14 season, the Spartans played in the South Division.

== Previous season ==
The Spartans finished the 2020–21 season 5–18, 5–11 in Big South play, to finish in ninth place. In the Big South tournament, they lost in the first round to High Point.

== Roster ==
2021–22 USC Upstate Spartans men's basketball team
Players
Coaches

Pos.	#	Name	Height	Weight	Year	Hometown
F	0	Khydarius Smith	6 ft 8 in (2.03 m)	205 lb (93 kg)	Jr	Fort Mill, SC
G/F	1	Quentin Hodge	6 ft 5 in (1.96 m)	191 lb (87 kg)	So	Sumter, SC
G	2	Cartier Jernigan	6 ft 1 in (1.85 m)	181 lb (82 kg)	Jr	Charlotte, NC
G	3	Mysta Goodloe	6 ft 5 in (1.96 m)	220 lb (100 kg)	Jr	Winston-Salem, NC
G	4	Jalen Breazeale	5 ft 10 in (1.78 m)	155 lb (70 kg)	Fr	Roebuck, SC
G/F	5	Bryson Mozone	6 ft 6 in (1.98 m)	205 lb (93 kg)	Sr	North Augusta, SC
G	11	Jordan Gainey	6 ft 4 in (1.93 m)	175 lb (79 kg)	Fr	Tucson, AZ
G	12	Dalvin White	5 ft 10 in (1.78 m)	162 lb (73 kg)	Sr	Norcross, GA
G	14	Floyd Jr. Rideau	6 ft 4 in (1.93 m)	173 lb (78 kg)	RS Fr	Lake Wales, FL
G	22	Thomas Sheida	6 ft 1 in (1.85 m)	191 lb (87 kg)	RS So	Bundaberg, Australia
G/F	23	Dave III Dickerson	6 ft 5 in (1.96 m)	213 lb (97 kg)	RS So	Inman, SC
G/F	24	Nick Alves	6 ft 6 in (1.98 m)	185 lb (84 kg)	Jr	Melbourne, FL
F	25	Jatayveous Watson	6 ft 8 in (2.03 m)	232 lb (105 kg)	Jr	Newnan, GA
G/F	34	Josh Aldrich	6 ft 8 in (2.03 m)	224 lb (102 kg)	Sr	Wilmington, NC
F	35	Ahmir Langlais	6 ft 8 in (2.03 m)	220 lb (100 kg)	RS Jr	Atlanta, GA

Head coach

- Dave Dickerson (Maryland)

Assistant coach(es)

- Stacey Palmore (Livingston)
- Andrew Garcia (Tulane)
- Anthony Johnson (Clemson)

Legend

- (C) Team captain
- (S) Suspended
- (I) Ineligible
- (W) Walk-on
- Injured
- Current redshirt

Roster
Last update: October 29, 2021

== Schedule and results ==
Date time, TV	Rank^{#}	Opponent^{#}	Result	Record	Site (attendance) city, state
Non-conference regular season
November 9, 2021*; 7:00 p.m., SECN+		at South Carolina	L 60–78	0–1	Colonial Life Arena (10,092); Columbia, SC
November 12, 2021*; 7:00 p.m., CUSA.tv		at Charlotte	L 64–76	0–2	Dale F. Halton Arena (2,654); Charlotte, NC
November 15, 2021*; 6:00 p.m., ESPN+		St. Andrews	W 96–43	1–2	G. B. Hodge Center (560); Spartanburg, SC
November 18, 2021*; 7:00 p.m., ESPN+		at East Tennessee State	L 43–56	1–3	Freedom Hall Civic Center (3,036); Johnson City, TN
November 23, 2021*; 7:00 p.m.		at South Carolina State	W 82–78	2–3	SHM Memorial Center (186); Orangeburg, SC
November 27, 2021*; 4:00 p.m., ESPN+		Furman	L 77–87	2–4	G. B. Hodge Center (449); Spartanburg, SC
December 1, 2021*; 6:00 p.m., ESPN+		North Carolina Central	L 65–67	2–5	G. B. Hodge Center (412); Spartanburg, SC
December 4, 2021*; 6:00 p.m., ESPN+		Western Carolina	L 73–78	2–6	G. B. Hodge Center (567); Spartanburg, SC
December 11, 2021*; 7:00 p.m., BSSO/BSSE		at Wake Forest	L 53–79	2–7	LJVM Coliseum (4,296); Winston-Salem, NC
December 14, 2021*; 7:00 p.m., SECN+		at No. 18 Tennessee	L 52–96	2–8	Thompson–Boling Arena (14,699); Knoxville, TN
December 18, 2021*; 4:00 p.m., ESPN+		Converse College	W 78–38	3–8	G. B. Hodge Center (382); Spartanburg, SC
December 21, 2021*; 12:00 p.m., ESPN+		at Ohio	L 70–85	3–9	Convocation Center (2,517); Athens, OH
December 30, 2021*; 4:00 p.m., ESPN+		Columbia International	Canceled due to COVID-19 issues		G. B. Hodge Center; Spartanburg, SC
Big South regular season
January 6, 2022; 6:00 p.m., ESPN+		Radford	L 77–82	3–10 (0–1)	G. B. Hodge Center (326); Spartanburg, SC
January 8, 2022; 4:00 p.m., ESPN+		at Presbyterian	W 82–72	4–10 (1–1)	Templeton Physical Education Center (177); Clinton, SC
January 12, 2022; 6:00 p.m., ESPN+		High Point	W 66–65	5–10 (2–1)	G. B. Hodge Center (669); Spartanburg, SC
January 15, 2022; 2:00 p.m., ESPN+		at UNC Asheville	W 76–73	6–10 (3–1)	Kimmel Arena (85); Asheville, NC
January 19, 2022; 7:00 p.m., ESPN+		at Gardner–Webb	W 74–61	7–10 (4–1)	Paul Porter Arena (520); Boiling Springs, NC
January 22, 2022; 4:00 p.m., ESPN+		Charleston Southern	W 70–57	8–10 (5–1)	G. B. Hodge Center (416); Spartanburg, SC
January 26, 2022; 6:00 p.m., ESPN+		Winthrop	L 91–95 ^{OT}	8–11 (5–2)	G. B. Hodge Center (818); Spartanburg, SC
January 29, 2022; 4:00 p.m., ESPN+		at North Carolina A&T	W 84–64	9–11 (6–2)	Corbett Sports Center (4,059); Greensboro, NC
February 2, 2022; 7:00 p.m., ESPN+		at Hampton	W 85–78	10–11 (7–2)	Hampton Convocation Center (2,123); Hampton, VA
February 5, 2022; 4:00 p.m., ESPN+		Campbell	L 71–80	10–12 (7–3)	G. B. Hodge Center (378); Spartanburg, SC
February 9, 2022; 7:00 p.m., ESPN+		at Longwood	L 72–85	10–13 (7–4)	Willett Hall (1,900); Farmville, VA
February 12, 2022; 4:00 p.m., ESPN+		UNC Asheville	L 56–83	10–14 (7–5)	G. B. Hodge Center (257); Spartanburg, SC
February 16, 2022; 6:00 p.m., ESPN+		Presbyterian	W 60–55	11–14 (8–5)	G. B. Hodge Center (833); Spartanburg, SC
February 19, 2022; 5:30 p.m., ESPN+		at Charleston Southern	W 78–73 ^{OT}	12–14 (9–5)	Buccaneer Field House (628); North Charleston, SC
February 24, 2022; 7:00 p.m., ESPN+		at Winthrop	L 59–89	12–15 (9–6)	Winthrop Coliseum (1,808); Rock Hill, SC
February 26, 2022; 4:00 p.m., ESPN+		Gardner–Webb	W 72–70	13–15 (10–6)	G. B. Hodge Center (722); Spartanburg, SC
Big South tournament
March 4, 2022; 2:00 p.m., ESPN+	(4)	vs. (12) Charleston Southern; Quarterfinals	W 72–62	14–15	Bojangles Coliseum; Charlotte, NC
March 5, 2022; 12:00 p.m., ESPN+	(4)	vs. (1) Longwood; Semifinals	L 70–79	14–16	Bojangles Coliseum; Charlotte, NC
The Basketball Classic
March 15, 2022; 6:30 p.m., ESPN+		at Appalachian State; First round	W 80–74	15–16	Holmes Center (2,146); Boone, NC
March 21, 2022; 8:00 p.m., ESPN+		at South Alabama; Second round	L 79–83	15–17	Mitchell Center (699); Mobile, AL
*Non-conference game. ^{#}Rankings from AP poll. (#) Tournament seedings in parentheses. All times are in Eastern.
