= 2021–22 High Point Panthers men's basketball team =

American college basketball season

2021–22 High Point Panthers men's basketball
- Conference: Big South Conference
- North Division
- Record: 14–17 (7–9 Big South)
- Head coach: Tubby Smith (resigned Feb. 16, 2022) (4th season); G. G. Smith (interim)
- Assistant coaches: Eric Grabriel; Keith Gatlin
- Home arena: Qubein Center

2021–22 Big South men's basketball standings
	Conf.				Overall
Team	W		L	PCT	W		L	PCT
North
Longwood †	15	–	1	.938	26	–	7	.788
Campbell	8	–	8	.500	16	–	13	.552
High Point	7	–	9	.438	14	–	18	.438
Radford	7	–	9	.438	11	–	18	.379
North Carolina A&T	6	–	10	.375	12	–	20	.375
Hampton	5	–	11	.313	9	–	19	.321
South
Winthrop	14	–	2	.875	23	–	9	.719
Gardner–Webb	11	–	5	.688	18	–	13	.581
USC Upstate	10	–	6	.625	15	–	17	.469
UNC Asheville	8	–	8	.500	17	–	15	.531
Presbyterian	4	–	12	.250	12	–	20	.375
Charleston Southern	1	–	15	.063	6	–	25	.194
† 2022 Big South tournament winner

The 2021–22 High Point Panthers men's basketball team represented High Point University in the 2021–22 NCAA Division I men's basketball season. The Panthers, led by fourth-year head coach Tubby Smith through the first 26 games of the season and by interim head coach G. G. Smith for the remainder of the season, played their home games at the newly opened Qubein Center in High Point, North Carolina as members of the Big South Conference. With the reintroduction of divisions for the first time since the 2013–14 season, the Panthers played in the North division. They finished the season 14–17, 7–9 in Big South play, to finish in a tie for third place in the North division. As the No. 7 seed in the Big South tournament, they defeated Hampton in the first round before losing to Winthrop in the quarterfinals.

On February 16, 2022, Tubby Smith announced he was stepping down as head coach effective immediately. His son, associate head coach G. G. Smith, was named interim coach for the remainder of the season and for the 2022–23 season.

== Previous season ==
In a season limited due to the ongoing COVID-19 pandemic, the Panthers finished the 2020–21 season 9–15, 6–11 in Big South play, to finish in eighth place. They defeated USC Upstate in the first round of the Big South tournament before losing to Winthrop in the quarterfinals.

== Roster ==
2021–22 High Point Panthers men's basketball team
Players
Coaches

Pos.	#	Name	Height	Weight	Year	Hometown
G	1	John-Michael Wright	6 ft 0 in (1.83 m)	186 lb (84 kg)	Jr	Fayetteville, NC
G	2	Jaden House	6 ft 3 in (1.91 m)	201 lb (91 kg)	So	Richmond, VA
G	3	Ahmil Flowers	6 ft 3 in (1.91 m)	180 lb (82 kg)	So	Greensboro, NC
F	4	Alex Holt	6 ft 8 in (2.03 m)	245 lb (111 kg)	So	Lexington, NC
G	5	Bryant Randleman	6 ft 3 in (1.91 m)	190 lb (86 kg)	Jr	Durham, NC
F/C	10	Emmanuel Izunabor	6 ft 8 in (2.03 m)	217 lb (98 kg)	Jr	Fayetteville, NC
F	11	David Caraher	6 ft 5 in (1.96 m)	217 lb (98 kg)	GS	Chapel Hill, NC
G	12	Bryson Childress	5 ft 8 in (1.73 m)	150 lb (68 kg)	So	Albemarle, NC
F	22	Rob III Peterson	6 ft 4 in (1.93 m)	190 lb (86 kg)	Sr	Charlotte, NC
G	23	Brock Williams	5 ft 10 in (1.78 m)	171 lb (78 kg)	Fr	Burlington, NC
F	24	Caleb Wright	6 ft 3 in (1.91 m)	206 lb (93 kg)	RS Fr	Phoenix, AZ
G	31	AJ Hoynack	6 ft 2 in (1.88 m)	180 lb (82 kg)	So	Miami, FL
G	32	John-Michael Hughes	6 ft 0 in (1.83 m)	181 lb (82 kg)	RS Jr	Ligonier, PA
F	35	Caden Sanchez	6 ft 6 in (1.98 m)	236 lb (107 kg)	RS Sr	Columbus, OH
F	42	Jake Koverman	6 ft 5 in (1.96 m)	192 lb (87 kg)	Fr	Severna Park, MD
F	55	Zack Austin	6 ft 5 in (1.96 m)	201 lb (91 kg)	RS Fr	Winston-Salem, NC

Head coach

- Tubby Smith (High Point)

Assistant coach(es)

- G. G. Smith (Georgia)
- Eric Gabriel (West Liberty)
- Keith Gatlin (Maryland)

Legend

- (C) Team captain
- (S) Suspended
- (I) Ineligible
- (W) Walk-on
- Injured
- Current redshirt

Roster
Last update: November 24, 2021

== Schedule and results ==
Date time, TV	Rank^{#}	Opponent^{#}	Result	Record	Site (attendance) city, state
Exhibition
November 4, 2021*; 7:00 p.m., ESPN+		Mount Olive	W 95–70	–	Qubein Center (4,115); High Point, NC
Non-conference regular season
November 9, 2021*; 8:00 p.m., ESPN+		Shenandoah	W 108–59	1–0	Qubein Center (2,814); High Point, NC
November 12, 2021*; 8:00 p.m., BTN+		at Northwestern	L 60–95	1–1	Welsh–Ryan Arena (3,074); Evanston, IL
November 16, 2021*; 8:00 p.m., ACCN		at Notre Dame	L 61–70	1–2	Edmund P. Joyce Center (5,124); Notre Dame, IN
November 20, 2021*; 2:00 p.m., ESPN+		Howard; Legends Classic at High Point	W 73–63	2–2	Qubein Center (3,957); High Point, NC
November 21, 2021*; 2:00 p.m.		Georgia State; Legends Classic at High Point	L 66–74 ^{OT}	2–3	Qubein Center (3,112); High Point, NC
November 27, 2021*; 2:00 p.m., ESPN+		Chowan	W 90–60	3–3	Qubein Center (1,375); High Point, NC
November 30, 2021*; 7:00 p.m., ESPN+		Furman	L 70–74	3–4	Qubein Center (2,711); High Point, NC
December 4, 2021*; 7:00 p.m., ESPN+		at Elon	W 83–77	4–4	Schar Center (3,158); Elon, NC
December 7, 2021*; 7:00 p.m., ESPN+		Guilford	W 64–59	5–4	Qubein Center (2,675); High Point, NC
December 10, 2021*; 7:00 p.m., ESPN+		vs. South Carolina State; No Room for Racism Classic	L 66–67	5–5	Rock Hill Sports and Event Center; Rock Hill, SC
December 18, 2021*; 2:00 p.m., ESPN+		UNC Wilmington	L 69–71 ^{OT}	5–6	Qubein Center (2,334); High Point, NC
December 21, 2021*; 7:00 p.m., ESPN+		Florida Atlantic	W 55–52	6–6	Qubein Center (2,216); High Point, NC
December 29, 2021*; 3:00 p.m., BTN		at No. 10 Michigan State	L 68–81	6–7	Breslin Center (14,797); East Lansing, MI
December 31, 2021*; 12:00 p.m., SECN		at No. 18 Kentucky	L 48–92	6–8	Rupp Arena (19,735); Lexington, KY
Big South regular season
January 12, 2022; 7:30 p.m., ESPN+		at USC Upstate	L 65–66	6–9 (0–1)	G. B. Hodge Center (669); Spartanburg, SC
January 15, 2022; 7:00 p.m., ESPN3		North Carolina A&T	W 75–71	7–9 (1–1)	Qubein Center (3,375); High Point, NC
January 19, 2022; 7:00 p.m., ESPN+		at Charleston Southern	L 66–70	7–10 (1–2)	Buccaneer Field House (511); North Charleston, SC
January 22, 2022; 4:00 p.m., ESPN+		at Hampton	L 64–68 ^{OT}	7–11 (1–3)	Hampton Convocation Center (0); Hampton, VA
January 24, 2022; 6:00 p.m., ESPN+		Winthrop; Rescheduled from January 5	W 65–56	8–11 (2–3)	Qubein Center (1,909); High Point, NC
January 26, 2022; 7:00 p.m., ESPN3		Radford	W 63–58	9–11 (3–3)	Qubein Center (2,255); High Point, NC
January 29, 2022; 2:00 p.m., ESPN+		at Campbell	L 72–77	9–12 (3–4)	Gore Arena (1,924); Buies Creek, NC
February 2, 2022; 7:00 p.m., ESPN3		Gardner–Webb	L 57–65	9–13 (3–5)	Qubein Center (1,922); High Point, NC
February 5, 2022; 7:00 p.m., ESPN+		UNC Asheville	W 91–83 ^{OT}	10–13 (4–5)	Qubein Center (4,698); High Point, NC
February 9, 2022; 7:00 p.m., ESPN3		at Presbyterian	W 79–70	11–13 (5–5)	Templeton Physical Education Center (423); Clinton, SC
February 12, 2022; 7:00 p.m., ESPN+		Campbell	L 42–60	11–14 (5–6)	Qubein Center (4,072); High Point, NC
February 15, 2022; 6:00 p.m., ESPN+		at Longwood; Rescheduled from January 8	L 66–70	11–15 (5–7)	Willett Hall (1,308); Farmville, VA
February 17, 2022; 9:00 p.m., ESPNU		Longwood	L 71–78	11–16 (5–8)	Qubein Center (5,647); High Point, NC
February 19, 2022; 2:00 p.m., ESPN+		at Radford	L 64–66	11–17 (5–9)	Dedmon Center (1,711); Radford, VA
February 23, 2022; 7:00 p.m., ESPN+		at North Carolina A&T	W 78–58	12–17 (6–9)	Corbett Sports Center (2,815); Greensboro, NC
February 26, 2022; 2:00 p.m., ESPN+		Hampton	W 88–77	13–17 (7–9)	Qubein Center (4,550); High Point, NC
Big South tournament
March 2, 2022; 6:00 p.m., ESPN+	(7)	vs. (10) Hampton; First round	W 84–77 ^{OT}	14–17	Bojangles Coliseum (0); Charlotte, NC
March 4, 2022; 6:00 p.m., ESPN+	(7)	vs. (2) Winthrop; Quarterfinals	L 51–68	14–18	Bojangles Coliseum; Charlotte, NC
*Non-conference game. ^{#}Rankings from AP poll. (#) Tournament seedings in parentheses. All times are in Eastern.
