= 2021–22 Gardner–Webb Runnin' Bulldogs men's basketball team =

American college basketball season

2021–22 Gardner–Webb Runnin' Bulldogs men's basketball
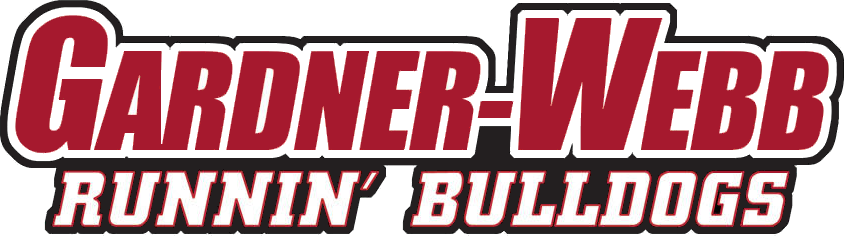
- Conference: Big South Conference
- South Division
- Record: 18–13 (11–5 Big South)
- Head coach: Tim Craft (9th season)
- Associate head coach: Jeremy Luther
- Assistant coaches: Jake DeLaney; Andrew Brown
- Home arena: Paul Porter Arena

2021–22 Big South men's basketball standings
	Conf.				Overall
Team	W		L	PCT	W		L	PCT
North
Longwood †	15	–	1	.938	26	–	7	.788
Campbell	8	–	8	.500	16	–	13	.552
High Point	7	–	9	.438	14	–	18	.438
Radford	7	–	9	.438	11	–	18	.379
North Carolina A&T	6	–	10	.375	12	–	20	.375
Hampton	5	–	11	.313	9	–	19	.321
South
Winthrop	14	–	2	.875	23	–	9	.719
Gardner–Webb	11	–	5	.688	18	–	13	.581
USC Upstate	10	–	6	.625	15	–	17	.469
UNC Asheville	8	–	8	.500	17	–	15	.531
Presbyterian	4	–	12	.250	12	–	20	.375
Charleston Southern	1	–	15	.063	6	–	25	.194
† 2022 Big South tournament winner

The 2021–22 Gardner–Webb Runnin' Bulldogs men's basketball team represented Gardner–Webb University in the 2021–22 NCAA Division I men's basketball season. The Runnin' Bulldogs, led by ninth-year head coach Tim Craft, played their home games at Paul Porter Arena in Boiling Springs, North Carolina as members of the Big South Conference. With the reintroduction of divisions for the first time since the 2013–14 season, the Bulldogs played in the South division. They finished the season 18–13, 11–5 in Big South play to finish second place in the South division. As the No. 3 seed in the Big South tournament, they defeated Campbell in the quarterfinals before losing to Winthrop in the semifinals.

== Previous season ==
In a season limited due to the ongoing COVID-19 pandemic, the Runnin' Bulldogs finished the 2020–21 season 11–15, 10–10 in Big South play to finish in a three-way tie for fifth place. They were defeated by Campbell in the quarterfinals of the Big South tournament.

== Roster ==
2021–22 Gardner–Webb Runnin' Bulldogs men's basketball team
Players
Coaches

Pos.	#	Name	Height	Weight	Year	Hometown
G	0	Lance Terry	6 ft 2 in (1.88 m)	180 lb (82 kg)	Jr	College Park, GA
G	1	Julien Soumaoro	5 ft 11 in (1.8 m)	165 lb (75 kg)	Fr	Bronx, NY
G	2	Jordan Sears	5 ft 11 in (1.8 m)	175 lb (79 kg)	So	Daytona Beach, FL
G	3	Brendan Mykalcio	6 ft 7 in (2.01 m)	190 lb (86 kg)	Fr	New City, NY
G	4	D'Maurian Williams	6 ft 5 in (1.96 m)	195 lb (88 kg)	So	Phoenix, AZ
F	5	Ademide Badmus	6 ft 7 in (2.01 m)	245 lb (111 kg)	Fr	Lynn, MA
G	10	Tyrone Simos-Primerano	6 ft 7 in (2.01 m)	190 lb (86 kg)	So	Melbourne, Australia
G	11	Leon Williams	6 ft 3 in (1.91 m)	185 lb (84 kg)	Fr	Cambridge, MA
F	14	Kareem Reid	6 ft 9 in (2.06 m)	205 lb (93 kg)	Jr	Queens, NY
F	15	Zion Williams	6 ft 4 in (1.93 m)	195 lb (88 kg)	GS	Maybrook, NY
G	23	Anthony Selden	6 ft 6 in (1.98 m)	220 lb (100 kg)	So	Boston, MA
F	24	Ludovic Dufeal	6 ft 8 in (2.03 m)	200 lb (91 kg)	Sr	Saint-Joseph, Martinique
C	25	Sammy Itodo	6 ft 8 in (2.03 m)	210 lb (95 kg)	So	Kaduna, Nigeria
F	31	John Roghelia	6 ft 2 in (1.88 m)	185 lb (84 kg)	Jr	Southport, NC
C	32	Christian Alexander	6 ft 8 in (2.03 m)	240 lb (109 kg)	Sr	Sherborne, Dorset, UK
G	35	Toler Reiff	6 ft 0 in (1.83 m)	180 lb (82 kg)	So	Hobe Sound, FL

Head coach

- Tim Craft (Florida)

Assistant coach(es)

- Jeremy Luther (North Greenville)
- Jake DeLaney (Gardner–Webb)
- Andrew Brown (Mercer)

Legend

- (C) Team captain
- (S) Suspended
- (I) Ineligible
- (W) Walk-on
- Injured
- Current redshirt

Roster
Last update: November 13, 2021

== Schedule and results ==
Date time, TV	Rank^{#}	Opponent^{#}	Result	Record	Site (attendance) city, state
Non-conference regular season
November 10, 2021*; 10:00 pm		at UNLV	L 58–64	0–1	Thomas & Mack Center (4,962); Paradise, NV
November 13, 2021*; 3:00 pm, SECN+		at No. 16 Arkansas	L 69–86	0–2	Bud Walton Arena (19,200); Fayetteville, AR
November 16, 2021*; 7:00 pm, RSN		at No. 7 Duke	L 52–92	0–3	Cameron Indoor Stadium (9,314); Durham, NC
November 20, 2021*; 4:00 pm, ESPN+		Carver	W 100–38	1–3	Paul Porter Arena (389); Boiling Springs, NC
November 24, 2021*; 7:00 pm, ESPN+		Columbia International	W 90–78	2–3	Paul Porter Arena (502); Boiling Springs, NC
November 27, 2021*; 2:00 pm, ESPN+		Western Carolina	W 87–59	3–3	Paul Porter Arena (175); Boiling Springs, NC
November 29, 2021*; 7:00 pm, ESPN+		North Carolina Central	W 83–58	4–3	Paul Porter Arena (504); Boiling Springs, NC
December 4, 2021*; 3:00 pm, ESPN+		at East Carolina	L 52–62	4–4	Williams Arena (2,861); Greenville, NC
December 8, 2021*; 7:00 pm, ESPN+		Wofford	L 70–78	4–5	Paul Porter Arena (552); Boiling Springs, NC
December 11, 2021*; 1:00 pm		at VMI	L 61–64	4–6	Cameron Hall (2,306); Lexington, VA
December 15, 2021*; 7:00 pm		at North Carolina Central	L 71–72	4–7	McDougald–McLendon Arena (462); Durham, NC
December 17, 2021*; 7:00 pm, ESPN+		Converse	W 79–46	5–7	Paul Porter Arena (249); Boiling Springs, NC
December 29, 2021*; 7:00 pm, SECN+		at Georgia	W 77–60	6–7	Stegeman Coliseum (6,476); Athens, GA
Big South regular season
January 5, 2022; 7:00 pm, ESPN+		at Charleston Southern	W 88–63	7–7 (1–0)	Buccaneer Field House (213); North Charleston, SC
January 8, 2022; 2:00 pm, ESPN+		Hampton	W 78–69	8–7 (2–0)	Paul Porter Arena (238); Boiling Springs, NC
January 12, 2022; 7:00 pm, ESPN+		Presbyterian	W 64–61	9–7 (3–0)	Paul Porter Arena (449); Boiling Springs, NC
January 15, 2022; 3:00 pm, ESPN+		at Longwood	L 60–66	9–8 (3–1)	Willett Hall (1,225); Farmville, VA
January 19, 2022; 7:00 pm, ESPN+		USC Upstate	L 61–74	9–9 (3–2)	Paul Porter Arena (520); Boiling Springs, NC
January 22, 2022; 2:00 pm, ESPN+		at Winthrop	L 62–64	9–10 (3–3)	Winthrop Coliseum (1,803); Rock Hill, SC
January 27, 2022; 6:30 pm, ESPNU		at UNC Asheville	W 61–55	10–10 (4–3)	Kimmel Arena (614); Asheville, NC
January 29, 2022; 4:30 pm, ESPN+		Radford	W 61–42	11–10 (5–3)	Paul Porter Arena (951); Boiling Springs, NC
February 2, 2022; 7:00 pm, ESPN3		at High Point	W 65–57	12–10 (6–3)	Qubein Center (1,922); High Point, NC
February 5, 2022; 2:00 pm, ESPN+		North Carolina A&T	W 69–62	13–10 (7–3)	Paul Porter Arena (943); Boiling Springs, NC
February 9, 2022; 7:00 pm, ESPN3		at Campbell	W 57–45	14–10 (8–3)	Gore Arena (1,250); Buies Creek, NC
February 12, 2022; 2:00 pm, ESPN+		Charleston Southern	W 82–65	15–10 (9–3)	Paul Porter Arena (1,092); Boiling Springs, NC
February 16, 2022; 7:00 pm, ESPN+		Winthrop	L 70–81	15–11 (9–4)	Paul Porter Arena (1,012); Boiling Springs, NC
February 19, 2022; 4:00 pm, ESPN+		at Presbyterian	W 76–68	16–11 (10–4)	Templeton Physical Education Center (586); Clinton, SC
February 23, 2022; 7:00 pm, ESPN+		UNC Asheville	W 60–59	17–11 (11–4)	Paul Porter Arena (687); Boiling Springs, NC
February 26, 2022; 4:00 pm, ESPN+		at USC Upstate	L 70–72	17–12 (11–5)	G. B. Hodge Center (722); Spartanburg, SC
Big South tournament
March 4, 2022; 8:00 pm, ESPN+	(3)	vs. (6) Campbell; Quarterfinals	W 54–53	18–12	Bojangles Coliseum; Charlotte, NC
March 5, 2022; 2:00 pm, ESPN+	(3)	vs. (2) Winthrop; Semifinals	L 67–76	18–13	Bojangles Coliseum; Charlotte, NC
*Non-conference game. ^{#}Rankings from AP Poll. (#) Tournament seedings in parentheses. All times are in Eastern.
