= 2021–22 UNC Asheville Bulldogs men's basketball team =

American college basketball season

2021–22 UNC Asheville Bulldogs men's basketball
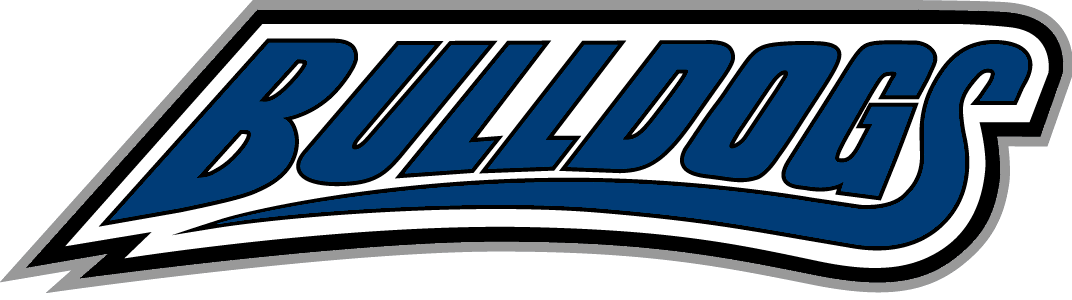

CBI, quarterfinals
- Conference: Big South Conference
- South Division
- Record: 17–15 (8–8 Big South)
- Head coach: Mike Morrell (4th season)
- Assistant coaches: Neil Dixon; Woody Taylor; Justin Levine
- Home arena: Kimmel Arena

2021–22 Big South men's basketball standings
	Conf.				Overall
Team	W		L	PCT	W		L	PCT
North
Longwood †	15	–	1	.938	26	–	7	.788
Campbell	8	–	8	.500	16	–	13	.552
High Point	7	–	9	.438	14	–	18	.438
Radford	7	–	9	.438	11	–	18	.379
North Carolina A&T	6	–	10	.375	12	–	20	.375
Hampton	5	–	11	.313	9	–	19	.321
South
Winthrop	14	–	2	.875	23	–	9	.719
Gardner–Webb	11	–	5	.688	18	–	13	.581
USC Upstate	10	–	6	.625	15	–	17	.469
UNC Asheville	8	–	8	.500	17	–	15	.531
Presbyterian	4	–	12	.250	12	–	20	.375
Charleston Southern	1	–	15	.063	6	–	25	.194
† 2022 Big South tournament winner

The 2021–22 UNC Asheville Bulldogs men's basketball team represented the University of North Carolina at Asheville in the 2021–22 NCAA Division I men's basketball season. The Bulldogs, led by fourth-year head coach Mike Morrell, played their home games at Kimmel Arena in Asheville, North Carolina as members of the Big South Conference. With the reintroduction of divisions for the first time since the 2013–14 season, the Bulldogs played in the South division. They finished the regular season 16–13, 8–8 in Big South play, which resulted in fourth place in the South division. As the No. 5 seed in the Big South tournament, they lost to Charleston Southern in the first round.

The Bulldogs participated in the College Basketball Invitational as a No. 13 seed, where they defeated No. 4 Stephen F. Austin in the first round before losing to No. 12 Northern Colorado in the quarterfinals.

== Previous season ==
In a season limited due to the ongoing COVID-19 pandemic, the Bulldogs finished the 2020–21 season 10–10, 9–5 in Big South play, to finish in fourth place. They were defeated by Longwood in the quarterfinals of the Big South tournament.

== Preseason ==
The Bulldogs were picked to finish in second place in the South division in a preseason poll. The team returned six of their top seven scorers from the prior season, including guard Tajion Jones who entered the season as the Big South's active leader in career points (1,058).

== Roster ==
2021–22 UNC Asheville Bulldogs men's basketball team
Players
Coaches

Pos.	#	Name	Height	Weight	Year	Hometown
G	0	Trent Stephney	6 ft 2 in (1.88 m)	170 lb (77 kg)	Jr	Knoxville, TN
F	1	Jamon Battle	6 ft 5 in (1.96 m)	210 lb (95 kg)	Jr	Richmond, VA
F	2	LJ Thorpe	6 ft 5 in (1.96 m)	215 lb (98 kg)	RS Sr	West Palm Beach, FL
G	3	Tajion Jones	6 ft 5 in (1.96 m)	190 lb (86 kg)	RS Jr	Oak Ridge, TN
G	4	Martin Kawa	6 ft 3 in (1.91 m)	185 lb (84 kg)	Fr	Stafford, VA
F	5	Silas Mason	6 ft 7 in (2.01 m)	185 lb (84 kg)	So	Greensboro, NC
F	10	Evan Clayborne	6 ft 6 in (1.98 m)	228 lb (103 kg)	GS	Dayton, OH
F	11	BJ Marable	6 ft 9 in (2.06 m)	230 lb (104 kg)	So	Knoxville, TN
G	13	Quay Kimble	5 ft 10 in (1.78 m)	165 lb (75 kg)	GS	Shelby, NC
F	14	Luke Lawson	6 ft 7 in (2.01 m)	180 lb (82 kg)	Sr	Coeburn, VA
G	15	Dean Gabrelcik	6 ft 4 in (1.93 m)	205 lb (93 kg)	Fr	East Lake, FL
G	21	Jordan Hairston	6 ft 0 in (1.83 m)	160 lb (73 kg)	So	Centreville, VA
F	22	Coty Jude	6 ft 9 in (2.06 m)	190 lb (86 kg)	Sr	Fort Gay, WV
G	30	Deacon Heath	6 ft 0 in (1.83 m)	170 lb (77 kg)	Sr	Banner Elk, NC
F	55	Drew Pember	6 ft 10 in (2.08 m)	190 lb (86 kg)	Jr	Knoxville, TN

Head coach

- Mike Morrell (Milligan)

Assistant coach(es)

- Neil Dixon (West Virginia)
- Woody Taylor (Eckerd)
- Justin Levine (Ithaca)

Legend

- (C) Team captain
- (S) Suspended
- (I) Ineligible
- (W) Walk-on
- Injured
- Current redshirt

Roster
Last update: October 27, 2021

== Schedule and results ==
During the non-conference half of the season, the Bulldogs used a balanced attack (Tajion Jones, Drew Pember and LJ Thorpe all averaging 10-15 points per game) to begin the conference half with the best record in either division of the Big South.

Date time, TV	Rank^{#}	Opponent^{#}	Result	Record	Site (attendance) city, state
Non-conference regular season
November 9, 2021*; 7:30 p.m., CUSAtv		at UAB	L 77–102	0–1	Bartow Arena (2,923); Birmingham, AL
November 11, 2021*; 6:30 p.m., ESPN+		Brevard	W 101–44	1–1	Kimmel Arena (1,290); Asheville, NC
November 14, 2021*; 2:00 p.m., ESPN+		at Chattanooga; Coke Zero Sugar Classic	L 45-75	1–2	McKenzie Arena (2,250); Chattanooga, TN
November 18, 2021*; 6:00 p.m.		vs. Tennessee Tech; Coke Zero Sugar Classic	W 61–55	2–2	McKenzie Arena (412); Chattanooga, TN
November 23, 2021*; 7:00 p.m., ACCNX		at North Carolina	L 53–72	2–3	Dean Smith Center (15,710); Chapel Hill, NC
November 28, 2021*; 4:30 p.m., ESPN+		St. Andrews	W 106–36	3–3	Kimmel Arena (659); Asheville, NC
December 1, 2021*; 6:30 p.m., ESPN+		The Citadel	W 65–58	4–3	Kimmel Arena (751); Asheville, NC
December 4, 2021*; 2:00 p.m., ESPN+		North Carolina Central	W 82–66	5–3	Kimmel Arena (580); Asheville, NC
December 8, 2021*; 6:30 p.m., ESPN+		Chattanooga	L 73–78	5–4	Kimmel Arena (405); Asheville, NC
December 11, 2021*; 2:00 p.m., ESPN+		at Western Carolina	W 73–72	6–4	Ramsey Center (2,418); Cullowhee, NC
December 14, 2021*; 8:00 p.m., ESPN+		at UT Martin	L 68–79	6–5	Skyhawk Arena (1,041); Martin, TN
December 18, 2021*; 2:00 p.m., ESPN+		East Tennessee State	W 79–64	7–5	Kimmel Arena (767); Asheville, NC
December 21, 2021*; 6:30 p.m., ESPN+		Milligan	W 114–54	8–5	Kimmel Arena (641); Asheville, NC
December 29, 2021*; 7:00 p.m., BTN		at Indiana	Canceled due to COVID-19 protocols		Simon Skjodt Assembly Hall; Bloomington, IN
Big South regular season
January 5, 2022; 7:00 p.m., ESPN+		at Campbell	W 60–54	9–5 (1–0)	Gore Arena (0); Buies Creek, NC
January 8, 2022; 4:30 p.m., ESPN+		Charleston Southern	W 82–59	10–5 (2–0)	Kimmel Arena (175); Asheville, NC
January 12, 2022; 7:00 p.m., ESPNU		at Winthrop	L 80–86 ^{OT}	10–6 (2–1)	Winthrop Coliseum (1,698); Rock Hill, SC
January 15, 2022; 2:00 p.m., ESPN+		USC Upstate	L 73–76	10–7 (2–2)	Kimmel Arena (85); Asheville, NC
January 19, 2022; 6:30 p.m., ESPN+		North Carolina A&T	L 71–73	10–8 (2–3)	Kimmel Arena (441); Asheville, NC
January 22, 2022; 2:00 p.m., ESPN+		at Radford	W 78–74 ^{OT}	11–8 (3–3)	Dedmon Center (1,181); Radford, VA
January 27, 2022; 6:30 p.m., ESPNU		Gardner–Webb	L 55–61	11–9 (3–4)	Kimmel Arena (614); Asheville, NC
January 29, 2022; 4:00 p.m., ESPN+		at Presbyterian	W 68–67	12–9 (4–4)	Templeton Physical Education Center (594); Clinton, SC
February 2, 2022; 6:30 p.m., ESPN+		Longwood	L 48–56	12–10 (4–5)	Kimmel Arena (507); Asheville, NC
February 5, 2022; 7:00 p.m., ESPN+		at High Point	L 83–91 ^{OT}	12–11 (4–6)	Qubein Center (4,698); High Point, NC
February 9, 2022; 6:30 p.m., ESPN+		Hampton	W 69–53	13–11 (5–6)	Kimmel Arena (572); Asheville, NC
February 12, 2022; 4:00 p.m., ESPN+		at USC Upstate	W 83–56	14–11 (6–6)	G. B. Hodge Center (267); Spartanburg, SC
February 16, 2022; 7:00 p.m., ESPN+		at Charleston Southern	W 85–66	15–11 (7–6)	Buccaneer Field House (619); North Charleston, SC
February 19, 2022; 4:30 p.m., ESPN3		Winthrop	L 79–84	15–12 (7–7)	Kimmel Arena (1,505); Asheville, NC
February 23, 2022; 7:00 p.m., ESPN+		at Gardner–Webb	L 59–60	15–13 (7–8)	Paul Porter Arena (687); Boiling Springs, NC
February 26, 2022; 4:30 p.m., ESPN+		Presbyterian	W 98–96 ^{OT}	16–13 (8–8)	Kimmel Arena (1,691); Asheville, NC
Big South tournament
March 2, 2022; 2:00 p.m., ESPN+	(5)	vs. (12) Charleston Southern; First round	L 78–79	16–14	Bojangles Coliseum; Charlotte, NC
CBI
March 19, 2022; 2:30 p.m., FloSports	(13)	vs. (4) Stephen F. Austin; First round	W 80–68	17–14	Ocean Center (588); Daytona Beach, FL
March 21, 2022; 3:30 p.m., FloSports	(13)	vs. (12) Northern Colorado; Quarterfinals	L 84–87	17–15	Ocean Center (706); Daytona Beach, FL
*Non-conference game. ^{#}Rankings from AP poll. (#) Tournament seedings in parentheses. All times are in Eastern.
