= 2021–22 Winthrop Eagles men's basketball team =

American college basketball season

2021–22 Winthrop Eagles men's basketball
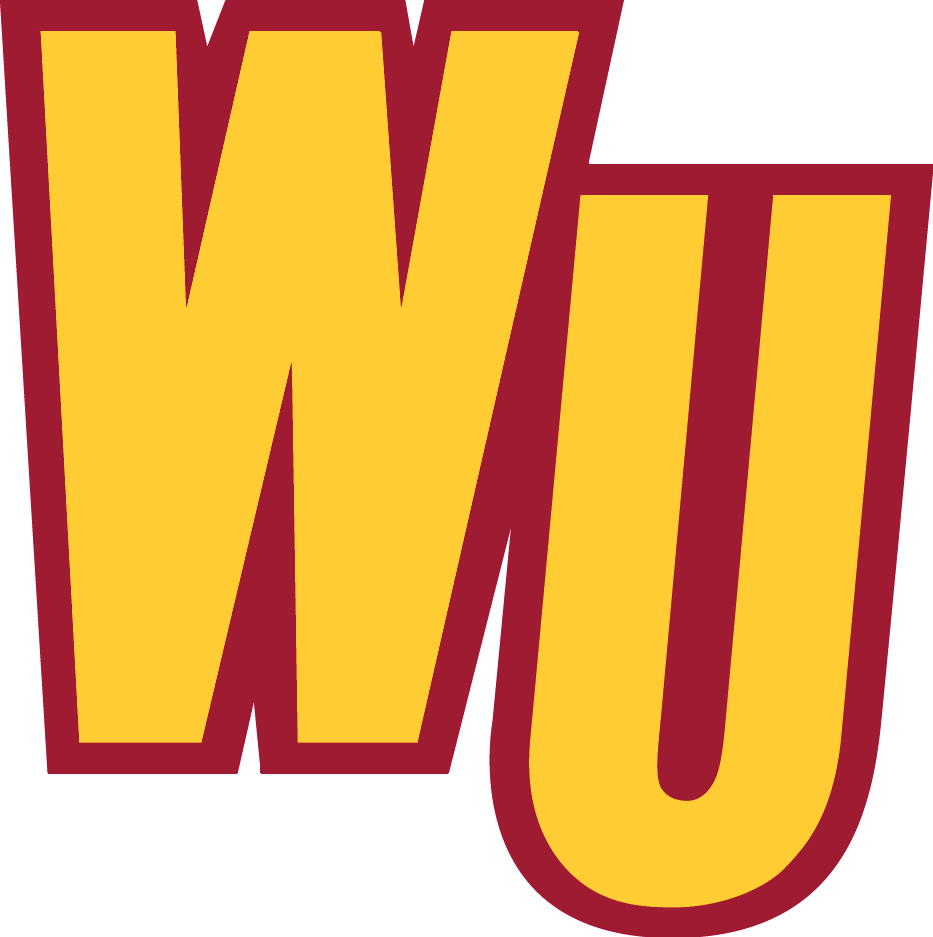

Big South South Division champions
- Conference: Big South Conference
- Record: 23–9 (14–2 Big South)
- Head coach: Mark Prosser (1st season)
- Assistant coaches: Tony Rack; Ben Betts; Brett Ferguson
- Home arena: Winthrop Coliseum

2021–22 Big South men's basketball standings
	Conf.				Overall
Team	W		L	PCT	W		L	PCT
North
Longwood †	15	–	1	.938	26	–	7	.788
Campbell	8	–	8	.500	16	–	13	.552
High Point	7	–	9	.438	14	–	18	.438
Radford	7	–	9	.438	11	–	18	.379
North Carolina A&T	6	–	10	.375	12	–	20	.375
Hampton	5	–	11	.313	9	–	19	.321
South
Winthrop	14	–	2	.875	23	–	9	.719
Gardner–Webb	11	–	5	.688	18	–	13	.581
USC Upstate	10	–	6	.625	15	–	17	.469
UNC Asheville	8	–	8	.500	17	–	15	.531
Presbyterian	4	–	12	.250	12	–	20	.375
Charleston Southern	1	–	15	.063	6	–	25	.194
† 2022 Big South tournament winner

The 2021–22 Winthrop Eagles men's basketball team represented Winthrop University in the 2021–22 NCAA Division I men's basketball season. The Eagles, led by first-year head coach Mark Prosser, played their home games at the Winthrop Coliseum in Rock Hill, South Carolina as members of the Big South Conference. They finished the season 23–9, 14–2 in Big South play, to finish as Big South South Division champions. As the No. 2 seed in the Big South tournament, they defeated High Point and Gardner–Webb, before falling to Longwood in the championship game.

== Previous season ==
The Eagles finished the 2020–21 season 23–2, 17–1 in Big South play, to finish as conference regular-season champions. They defeated Campbell in the finals of the Big South tournament. They earned the Big South's automatic bid into the NCAA tournament and were defeated by Villanova in the first round.

== Roster ==
2021–22 Winthrop Eagles men's basketball team
Players
Coaches

Pos.	#	Name	Height	Weight	Year	Hometown
G	0	Russell Jr. Jones	5 ft 8 in (1.73 m)	175 lb (79 kg)	Jr	Blythewood, SC
G	1	Toneari Lane	6 ft 5 in (1.96 m)	210 lb (95 kg)	So	Atlanta, GA
G	2	Sin'Cere McMahon	6 ft 1 in (1.85 m)	167 lb (76 kg)	So	Indianapolis, IN
G	3	Micheal Anumba	6 ft 4 in (1.93 m)	220 lb (100 kg)	Sr	Reggio Emilia, Italy
G	4	Kelton Talford	6 ft 7 in (2.01 m)	195 lb (88 kg)	So	Great Falls, SC
G	5	Patrick Good	6 ft 0 in (1.83 m)	175 lb (79 kg)	GS	Johnson City, TN
G	10	Cameron Whiteside	6 ft 5 in (1.96 m)	—	Jr	Thomasville, NC
G	11	Drew Buggs	6 ft 3 in (1.91 m)	195 lb (88 kg)	GS	Long Beach, CA
F	12	Cory Hightower	6 ft 7 in (2.01 m)	222 lb (101 kg)	RS Jr	Flint, MI
G	13	Nate Buss	5 ft 11 in (1.8 m)	175 lb (79 kg)	RS Sr	Verona, WI
G	21	Jamal King	6 ft 5 in (1.96 m)	230 lb (104 kg)	Jr	Goldsboro, NC
F	30	D. J. Burns	6 ft 9 in (2.06 m)	275 lb (125 kg)	RS Jr	Rock Hill, SC
G	32	Josh Corbin	6 ft 3 in (1.91 m)	190 lb (86 kg)	RS So	Gahanna, OH
F	33	Chase Claxton	6 ft 7 in (2.01 m)	185 lb (84 kg)	Jr	Greenville, SC

Head coach

- Mark Prosser (Marist)

Assistant coach(es)

- Tony Rack (Northern Kentucky)
- Ben Betts (Roanoke)
- Brett Ferguson (Michigan State)

Legend

- (C) Team captain
- (S) Suspended
- (I) Ineligible
- (W) Walk-on
- Injured
- Current redshirt

Roster
Last update: January 18, 2022

== Schedule and results ==
Date time, TV	Rank^{#}	Opponent^{#}	Result	Record	Site (attendance) city, state
Non-conference regular season
November 9, 2021*; 6:00 p.m., ESPN+		Mary Baldwin	W 110–78	1–0	Winthrop Coliseum (921); Rock Hill, SC
November 13, 2021*; 2:00 p.m., ESPN+		Mercer	W 88–85 ^{OT}	2–0	Winthrop Coliseum (1,778); Rock Hill, SC
November 16, 2021*; 7:00 p.m., CUSA.tv		at Middle Tennessee	L 65–76	2–1	Murphy Center (3,212); Murfreesboro, TN
November 20, 2021*; 8:00 p.m., SECN+		at Vanderbilt	L 63–77	2–2	Memorial Gymnasium (5,179); Nashville, TN
November 22, 2021*; 9:00 p.m., P12N		at Washington State	L 86–92	2–3	Beasley Coliseum (2,370); Pullman, WA
November 27, 2021*; 10:00 p.m., P12N		at Washington	W 82–74	3–3	Hec Edmundson Pavilion (5,703); Seattle, WA
December 1, 2021*; 7:30 p.m., ESPN+		Hartford	W 82–75	4–3	Winthrop Coliseum (950); Rock Hill, SC
December 4, 2021*; 1:00 p.m., ESPN+		at Coastal Carolina	L 64–74	4–4	HTC Center (946); Conway, SC
December 7, 2021*; 7:00 p.m., ESPN+		Furman	W 85–80	5–4	Winthrop Coliseum (920); Rock Hill, SC
December 11, 2021*; 7:00 p.m.		Carver	W 83–52	6–4	Winthrop Coliseum (535); Rock Hill, SC
December 15, 2021*; 7:00 p.m., FloHoops		at Elon	L 61–63	6–5	Schar Center (1,256); Elon, NC
December 21, 2021*; 7:00 p.m.		at Mississippi State	L 63–84	6–6	Humphrey Coliseum (1,474); Starkville, MS
December 31, 2021*; 1:00 p.m., ESPN+		Converse	W 78–40	7–6	Winthrop Coliseum (672); Rock Hill, SC
Big South Conference regular season
January 10, 2022; 2:00 p.m., ESPN+		Campbell	W 74–72	8–6 (1–0)	Winthrop Coliseum (708); Rock Hill, SC
January 12, 2022; 7:00 p.m., ESPNU		UNC Asheville	W 86–80 ^{OT}	9–6 (2–0)	Winthrop Coliseum (1,698); Rock Hill, SC
January 15, 2022; 5:30 p.m., ESPN+		at Charleston Southern	W 70–65	10–6 (3–0)	Buccaneer Field House (711); North Charleston, SC
January 20, 2022; 7:00 p.m., ESPN+		at Presbyterian	W 60–58	11–6 (4–0)	Templeton Physical Education Center (713); Clinton, SC
January 22, 2022; 2:00 p.m., ESPN+		Gardner–Webb	W 64–62	12–6 (5–0)	Winthrop Coliseum (1,803); Rock Hill, SC
January 24, 2022; 6:00 p.m., ESPN+		at High Point; Rescheduled from January 5	L 56–65	12–7 (5–1)	Qubein Center (1,909); High Point, NC
January 26, 2022; 6:00 p.m., ESPN+		at USC Upstate	W 95–91 ^{OT}	13–7 (6–1)	G. B. Hodge Center (818); Spartanburg, SC
January 29, 2022; 3:00 p.m., ESPN+		at Longwood	L 88–92	13–8 (6–2)	Willett Hall (1,900); Farmville, VA
February 2, 2022; 7:00 p.m., ESPNU		North Carolina A&T	W 64–54	14–8 (7–2)	Winthrop Coliseum (2,192); Rock Hill, SC
February 5, 2022; 5:30 p.m., ESPN+		at Hampton	W 69–57	15–8 (8–2)	Hampton Convocation Center (1,500); Hampton, VA
February 9, 2022; 7:00 p.m., ESPN+		Radford	W 58–48	16–8 (9–2)	Winthrop Coliseum (1,611); Rock Hill, SC
February 12, 2022; 4:30 p.m., ESPN+		Presbyterian	W 65–61	17–8 (10–2)	Winthrop Coliseum (2,006); Rock Hill, SC
February 16, 2022; 7:00 p.m., ESPN+		at Gardner–Webb	W 81–70	18–8 (11–2)	Paul Porter Arena (1,012); Boiling Springs, NC
February 19, 2022; 4:30 p.m., ESPN+		at UNC Asheville	W 84–79	19–8 (12–2)	Kimmel Arena (1,505); Asheville, NC
February 24, 2022; 7:00 p.m., ESPN+		USC Upstate	W 89–59	20–8 (13–2)	Winthrop Coliseum (1,808); Rock Hill, SC
February 26, 2022; 4:00 p.m., ESPN+		Charleston Southern	W 92–86	21–8 (14–2)	Winthrop Coliseum (2,378); Rock Hill, SC
Big South tournament
March 4, 2022; 6:00 p.m., ESPN+	(2)	vs. (7) High Point; Quarterfinals	W 68–51	22–8	Bojangles Coliseum; Charlotte, NC
March 5, 2022; 2:00 p.m., ESPN+	(2)	vs. (3) Gardner-Webb; Semifinals	W 76–67	23–8	Bojangles Coliseum; Charlotte, NC
March 6, 2022; 12:00 p.m., ESPN2	(2)	vs. (1) Longwood; Championship	L 58–79	23–9	Bojangles Coliseum; Charlotte, NC
*Non-conference game. ^{#}Rankings from AP poll. (#) Tournament seedings in parentheses. All times are in Eastern.
