= 2021–22 Radford Highlanders men's basketball team =

American college basketball season

2021–22 Radford Highlanders men's basketball
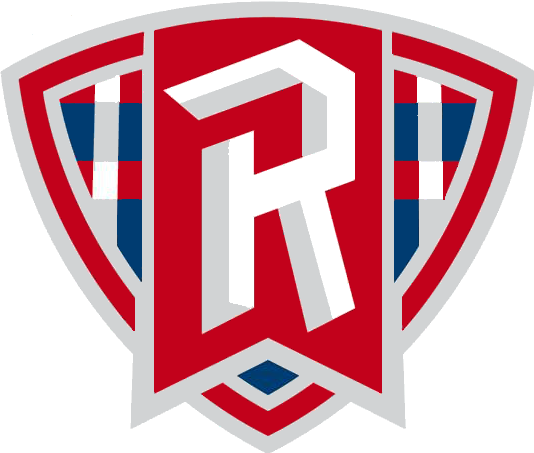
- Conference: Big South Conference
- Record: 11–18 (7–9 Big South)
- Head coach: Darris Nichols (1st season)
- Assistant coaches: Shane Nichols; Timothy Peete; James Haring
- Home arena: Dedmon Center

2021–22 Big South men's basketball standings
	Conf.				Overall
Team	W		L	PCT	W		L	PCT
North
Longwood †	15	–	1	.938	26	–	7	.788
Campbell	8	–	8	.500	16	–	13	.552
High Point	7	–	9	.438	14	–	18	.438
Radford	7	–	9	.438	11	–	18	.379
North Carolina A&T	6	–	10	.375	12	–	20	.375
Hampton	5	–	11	.313	9	–	19	.321
South
Winthrop	14	–	2	.875	23	–	9	.719
Gardner–Webb	11	–	5	.688	18	–	13	.581
USC Upstate	10	–	6	.625	15	–	17	.469
UNC Asheville	8	–	8	.500	17	–	15	.531
Presbyterian	4	–	12	.250	12	–	20	.375
Charleston Southern	1	–	15	.063	6	–	25	.194
† 2022 Big South tournament winner

The 2021–22 Radford Highlanders men's basketball team represented Radford University in the 2021–22 NCAA Division I men's basketball season. The Highlanders, led by first-year head coach Darris Nichols, played their home games at the Dedmon Center in Radford, Virginia as members of the Big South Conference.

The Highlanders finished the season 11–18, 7–9 in Big South play, to finish in a tie for third place in the North Division. In the Big South tournament, they were defeated by North Carolina A&T in the first round.

== Previous season ==
The Highlanders finished the 2020–21 season 15–12, 12–6 in Big South play, to finish in second place. They lost to Campbell in the semifinals of the Big South tournament.

== Roster ==
2021–22 Radford Highlanders men's basketball team
Players
Coaches

Pos.	#	Name	Height	Weight	Year	Hometown
G	0	Roshaun Black	6 ft 4 in (1.93 m)	190 lb (86 kg)	Jr	Hollywood, FL
G	2	Josiah Jeffers	6 ft 1 in (1.85 m)	170 lb (77 kg)	Sr	Burlington, NC
G	3	Tai'Reon Joseph	6 ft 2 in (1.88 m)	175 lb (79 kg)	So	Baton Rouge, LA
G	4	Derrick Jr. Jones	6 ft 6 in (1.98 m)	170 lb (77 kg)	Fr	Charlottesville, VA
F	5	Rashun Williams	6 ft 7 in (2.01 m)	220 lb (100 kg)	Jr	Arlington, GA
F	10	Joshua Walker	6 ft 7 in (2.01 m)	200 lb (91 kg)	So	Upper Marlboro, MD
G	11	Camron McNeil	6 ft 5 in (1.96 m)	185 lb (84 kg)	So	Raleigh, NC
G	12	Austin Brown	6 ft 2 in (1.88 m)	180 lb (82 kg)	Sr	Christiansburg, VA
F	13	Shaquan Jules	6 ft 7 in (2.01 m)	235 lb (107 kg)	Jr	Orlando, FL
F	14	Chyree Walker	6 ft 5 in (1.96 m)	200 lb (91 kg)	RS Sr	Upper Marlboro, MD
G	15	Bryan Hart	6 ft 1 in (1.85 m)	180 lb (82 kg)	GS	Hampton, VA
F	20	Dravon Mangum	6 ft 8 in (2.03 m)	200 lb (91 kg)	RS Jr	Roxboro, NC
C	22	Lewis Djonkam	6 ft 9 in (2.06 m)	245 lb (111 kg)	RS Sr	Springfield, VA
G	24	Artese Stapleton	6 ft 2 in (1.88 m)	165 lb (75 kg)	Jr	Chicago, IL
G	45	Xavier Lipscomb	6 ft 2 in (1.88 m)	195 lb (88 kg)	So	Washington, D.C.

Head coach

- Darris Nichols (West Virginia)

Assistant coach(es)

- Shane Nichols (Wofford)
- Timothy Peete (Tulsa)
- James Haring (West Virginia)

Legend

- (C) Team captain
- (S) Suspended
- (I) Ineligible
- (W) Walk-on
- Injured
- Current redshirt

Roster
Last update: January 17, 2022

== Schedule and results ==
Date time, TV	Rank^{#}	Opponent^{#}	Result	Record	Site (attendance) city, state
Exhibition
November 1, 2021*; 6:30 p.m.		Eastern Mennonite	W 83–60	–	Dedmon Center (550); Radford, VA
Non-conference regular season
November 9, 2021*; 6:30 p.m., ESPN+		Emory & Henry	W 84–72	1–0	Dedmon Center (1,782); Radford, VA
November 12, 2021*; 7:00 p.m., ACCNX/ESPN+		at No. 25 Virginia	L 52–73	1–1	John Paul Jones Arena (13,568); Charlottesville, VA
November 15, 2021*; 7:00 p.m., ACCNX/ESPN+		at Virginia Tech	L 39–65	1–2	Cassell Coliseum (6,835); Blacksburg, VA
November 19, 2021*; 7:00 p.m., ESPN+		at Furman	L 64–81	1–3	Timmons Arena (1,658); Greenville, SC
November 20, 2021*; 5:00 p.m.		vs. Navy	L 33–47	1–4	Timmons Arena (118); Greenville, SC
November 24, 2021*; 5:00 p.m., ESPN+		William & Mary	W 67–54	2–4	Dedmon Center (1,016); Radford, VA
November 28, 2021*; 4:30 p.m., ESPN+		Eastern Kentucky	W 88–75	3–4	Dedmon Center (1,500); Radford, VA
November 30, 2021*; 6:30 p.m., ESPN+		Kentucky Christian	W 79–70	4–4	Dedmon Center (1,028); Radford, VA
December 4, 2021*; 4:00 p.m., Big 12 Now		at West Virginia	L 51–67	4–5	WVU Coliseum (11,014); Morgantown, WV
December 11, 2021*; 7:00 p.m.		at James Madison	L 70–79	4–6	Atlantic Union Bank Center (4,713); Harrisonburg, VA
December 13, 2021*; 7:00 p.m., ESPN+		at George Washington	L 58–67	4–7	Charles E. Smith Center (1,013); Washington, D.C.
December 18, 2021*; 1:00 p.m.		at Davidson	L 54–74	4–8	John M. Belk Arena (2,594); Davidson, NC
December 20, 2021*; 7:00 p.m.		at Akron	Postponed due to COVID-19 issues		James A. Rhodes Arena; Akron, OH
December 29, 2021*; 7:00 p.m.		at UMBC	Canceled due to COVID-19 protocols		Chesapeake Employers Insurance Arena; Catonsville, MD
January 1, 2022*; 4:30 p.m.		Averett	Canceled due to COVID-19 protocols		Dedmon Center; Radford, VA
Big South Conference regular season
January 6, 2022; 4:00 p.m., ESPN+		at USC Upstate	W 82–77	5–8 (1–0)	G. B. Hodge Center (326); Spartanburg, SC
January 8, 2022; 4:30 p.m., ESPN+		North Carolina A&T	L 72–73	5–9 (1–1)	Dedmon Center (910); Radford, VA
January 12, 2022; 6:30 p.m., ESPN+		Longwood	L 75–83 ^{OT}	5–10 (1–2)	Dedmon Center (1,064); Radford, VA
January 15, 2022; 2:00 p.m., ESPN+		at Campbell	L 58–70	5–11 (1–3)	Gore Arena (0); Buies Creek, NC
January 19, 2022; 6:30 p.m., ESPN+		Hampton	W 54–51	6–11 (2–3)	Dedmon Center (1,131); Radford, VA
January 22, 2022; 2:00 p.m., ESPN+		UNC Asheville	L 74–78 ^{OT}	6–12 (2–4)	Dedmon Center (1,181); Radford, VA
January 26, 2022; 7:00 p.m., ESPN3		at High Point	L 58–63	6–13 (2–5)	Qubein Center (2,255); High Point, NC
January 29, 2022; 4:30 p.m., ESPN+		at Gardner–Webb	L 42–61	6–14 (2–6)	Paul Porter Arena (951); Boiling Springs, NC
February 2, 2022; 6:30 p.m., ESPN3		Charleston Southern	W 64–52	7–14 (3–6)	Dedmon Center (1,099); Radford, VA
February 5, 2022; 4:30 p.m., ESPN+		Presbyterian	L 70–78	7–15 (3–7)	Dedmon Center (1,214); Radford, VA
February 9, 2022; 7:00 p.m., ESPN3		at Winthrop	L 48–58	7–16 (3–8)	Winthrop Coliseum (1,611); Rock Hill, SC
February 12, 2022; 5:30 p.m., ESPN3		at Hampton	W 60–54	8–16 (4–8)	Hampton Convocation Center (3,146); Hampton, VA
February 16, 2022; 6:30 p.m., ESPN+		Campbell	W 71–67	9–16 (5–8)	Dedmon Center (949); Radford, VA
February 19, 2022; 2:00 p.m., ESPN+		High Point	W 66–64	10–16 (6–8)	Dedmon Center (1,711); Radford, VA
February 23, 2022; 7:00 p.m., ESPN+		at Longwood	L 66–71	10–17 (6–9)	Willett Hall (1,900); Farmville, VA
February 26, 2022; 5:00 p.m., ESPN+		at North Carolina A&T	W 62–53	11–17 (7–9)	Corbett Sports Center (3,886); Greensboro, NC
Big South tournament
March 2, 2022; 11:30 a.m., ESPN+	(8)	vs. (9) North Carolina A&T; First round	L 71–78 ^{OT}	11–18	Bojangles Coliseum; Charlotte, NC
*Non-conference game. ^{#}Rankings from AP poll. (#) Tournament seedings in parentheses. All times are in Eastern.
