= 2021–22 Campbell Fighting Camels men's basketball team =

American college basketball season

2021–22 Campbell Fighting Camels men's basketball
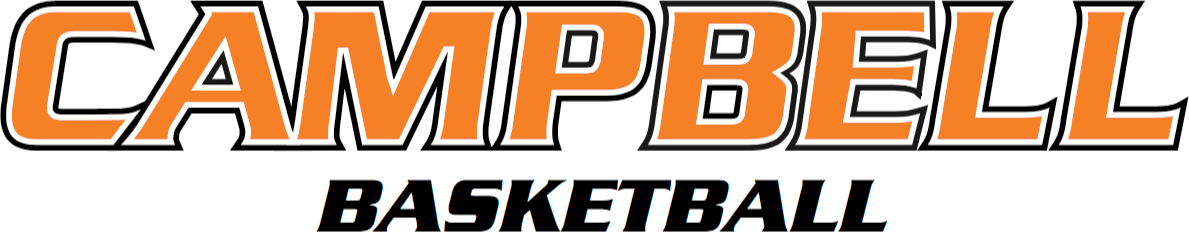
- Conference: Big South Conference
- Record: 16–13 (8–8 Big South)
- Head coach: Kevin McGeehan (9th season)
- Associate head coach: Peter Thomas
- Assistant coaches: Kevin Smith; Kenneth White
- Home arena: Gore Arena

2021–22 Big South men's basketball standings
	Conf.				Overall
Team	W		L	PCT	W		L	PCT
North
Longwood †	15	–	1	.938	26	–	7	.788
Campbell	8	–	8	.500	16	–	13	.552
High Point	7	–	9	.438	14	–	18	.438
Radford	7	–	9	.438	11	–	18	.379
North Carolina A&T	6	–	10	.375	12	–	20	.375
Hampton	5	–	11	.313	9	–	19	.321
South
Winthrop	14	–	2	.875	23	–	9	.719
Gardner–Webb	11	–	5	.688	18	–	13	.581
USC Upstate	10	–	6	.625	15	–	17	.469
UNC Asheville	8	–	8	.500	17	–	15	.531
Presbyterian	4	–	12	.250	12	–	20	.375
Charleston Southern	1	–	15	.063	6	–	25	.194
† 2022 Big South tournament winner

The 2021–22 Campbell Fighting Camels men's basketball team represented Campbell University in the 2021–22 NCAA Division I men's basketball season. The Fighting Camels, led by 9th-year head coach Kevin McGeehan, played their home games at Gore Arena in Buies Creek, North Carolina as members of the Big South Conference.

== Previous season ==
The Fighting Camels finished the 2020–21 season 17–10, 11–6 in Big South play to finish in third place. They lost in the Championship of the Big South tournament to Winthrop.

== Roster ==
2021–22 Campbell Fighting Camels men's basketball team
Players
Coaches

Pos.	#	Name	Height	Weight	Year	Hometown
G	0	Gediminas Mokšeckas	6 ft 4 in (1.93 m)	200 lb (91 kg)	So	Vilnius, Lithuania
G	1	Ricky Clemons	6 ft 2 in (1.88 m)	210 lb (95 kg)	Sr	Raleigh, NC
G	2	PJ Carter	6 ft 5 in (1.96 m)	175 lb (79 kg)	So	Atlanta, GA
G	4	Broc Bidwell	6 ft 0 in (1.83 m)	170 lb (77 kg)	Fr	Cumming, GA
G	5	Messiah Thompson	5 ft 8 in (1.73 m)	170 lb (77 kg)	Jr	Atlanta, GA
C	10	Milos Stajcic	6 ft 10 in (2.08 m)	240 lb (109 kg)	Sr	Belgrade, Serbia
G	11	Jordan Whitfield	6 ft 1 in (1.85 m)	175 lb (79 kg)	Sr	Raleigh, NC
F	12	Jesús Carralero	6 ft 8 in (2.03 m)	220 lb (100 kg)	Jr	Málaga, Spain
G	13	Austin McCullough	6 ft 5 in (1.96 m)	210 lb (95 kg)	Sr	Birmingham, AL
G	14	Jaden Kennedy	6 ft 4 in (1.93 m)	185 lb (84 kg)	Fr	District Heights, MD
G	15	Dakari Johnson	6 ft 0 in (1.83 m)	180 lb (82 kg)	So	Raeford, NC
G	20	Thomas Dees	6 ft 3 in (1.91 m)	190 lb (86 kg)	So	Four Oaks, NC
G	21	Nathan Yow	6 ft 0 in (1.83 m)	170 lb (77 kg)	Jr	Sanford, NC
F	22	Laurynas Vaištaras	6 ft 6 in (1.98 m)	215 lb (98 kg)	So	Plungė, Lithuania
F	23	Joshua Lusane	6 ft 7 in (2.01 m)	240 lb (109 kg)	Jr	Americus, GA
G	25	Darwin Randolph	6 ft 0 in (1.83 m)	180 lb (82 kg)	Fr	Chattanooga, TN
G	30	Ethan Lynch	6 ft 2 in (1.88 m)	215 lb (98 kg)	So	Accokeek, MD
G/F	44	Mason Grant	6 ft 5 in (1.96 m)	205 lb (93 kg)	Fr	North Charleston, SC
G/F	45	Cedric Henderson Jr.	6 ft 6 in (1.98 m)	200 lb (91 kg)	Sr	Memphis, TN

Head coach

- Kevin McGeehan (Gettysburg)

Assistant coach(es)

- Peter Thomas (Richmond)
- Kevin Smith (Richmond)
- Kenneth White (North Carolina)

Legend

- (C) Team captain
- (S) Suspended
- (I) Ineligible
- (W) Walk-on
- Injured
- Current redshirt

Roster
Last update: January 17, 2022

== Schedule and results ==
Date time, TV	Rank^{#}	Opponent^{#}	Result	Record	Site (attendance) city, state
Exhibition
October 22, 2021*; 7:00 pm		St. Augustine's	W 75-48	–	Gore Arena (1,036); Buies Creek, NC
Non-conference regular season
November 9, 2021*; 7:30 pm, ESPN+		William Peace	W 85–50	1–0	Gore Arena (1,476); Buies Creek, NC
November 12, 2021*; 1:30 pm, ESPN+/ACCNX		vs. Hartford; Duke Veterans Day Weekend Showcase	W 68–67	2–0	Cameron Indoor Stadium; Durham, NC
November 13, 2021*; 8:00 pm, ESPN+/ACCNX		at No. 9 Duke; Duke Veterans Day Weekend Showcase	L 56–67	2–1	Cameron Indoor Stadium (9,314); Durham, NC
November 18, 2021*; 7:00 pm, ESPN+		at Marshall	W 67–65	3–1	Cam Henderson Center (4,131); Huntington, WV
November 24, 2021*; 1:00 pm, ESPN+		Maryland Eastern Shore	W 66–55	4–1	Gore Arena (1,178); Buies Creek, NC
November 27, 2021*; 3:00 pm, ESPN+		at Stetson	W 60–58	5–1	Edmunds Center (387); DeLand, FL
November 30, 2021*; 7:00 pm, ESPN+		Lancaster Bible	W 83–39	6–1	Gore Arena (1,117); Buies Creek, NC
December 4, 2021*; 4:00 pm, MASN/ESPN+		at VCU	L 61–65	6–2	Siegel Center (7,321); Richmond, VA
December 7, 2021*; 7:00 pm, ESPN+		Columbia International	W 74–56	7–2	Gore Arena (1,110); Buies Creek, NC
December 15, 2021*; 7:00 pm, ESPN+		Georgia Southern	L 66–69	7–3	Gore Arena (1,360); Buies Creek, NC
December 22, 2021*; 12:00 pm, FloHoops		at UNC Wilmington	L 58–65	7–4	Trask Coliseum (2,378); Wilmington, NC
December 29, 2021*; 7:30 pm, ESPN+		Norfolk State	Postponed due to COVID-19 issues		Gore Arena; Buies Creek, NC
January 2, 2022*; 2:00 pm, ESPN+		Jacksonville	Canceled due to COVID-19 issues		Gore Arena; Buies Creek, NC
Big South Conference regular season
January 5, 2022; 7:00 pm, ESPN+		UNC Asheville	L 54–60	7–5 (0–1)	Gore Arena; Buies Creek, NC
January 10, 2022; 5:00 pm, ESPN+		at Winthrop	L 72–74	7–6 (0–2)	Winthrop Coliseum (708); Rock Hill, SC
January 12, 2022; 7:00 pm, ESPN+		Charleston Southern	W 67–52	8–6 (1–2)	Gore Arena; Buies Creek, NC
January 15, 2022; 2:00 pm, ESPN+		Radford	W 70–58	9–6 (2–2)	Gore Arena (0); Buies Creek, NC
January 19, 2022; 7:00 pm, ESPN+		at Longwood	L 64–72	9–7 (2–3)	Willett Hall (1,650); Farmville, VA
January 22, 2022; 5:00 pm, ESPN+		at North Carolina A&T	W 73–72	10–7 (3–3)	Corbett Sports Center (3,523); Greensboro, NC
January 26, 2022; 7:00 pm, ESPN+		Hampton	W 75–60	11–7 (4–3)	Gore Arena (1,420); Buies Creek, NC
January 29, 2022; 2:00 pm, ESPN+		High Point	W 77–72	12–7 (5–3)	Gore Arena (1,924); Buies Creek, NC
February 2, 2022; 7:00 pm, ESPN+		at Presbyterian	L 58–64	12–8 (5–4)	Templeton Physical Education Center (399); Clinton, SC
February 5, 2022; 4:00 pm, ESPN+		at USC Upstate	W 80–71	13–8 (6–4)	G. B. Hodge Center (378); Spartanburg, SC
February 9, 2022; 7:00 pm, ESPN+		Gardner–Webb	L 45–57	13–9 (6–5)	Gore Arena (1,250); Buies Creek, NC
February 12, 2022; 7:00 pm, ESPN+		at High Point	W 60–42	14–9 (7–5)	Qubein Center (4,072); High Point, NC
February 16, 2022; 6:30 pm, ESPN+		at Radford	L 67–71	14–10 (7–6)	Dedmon Center (949); Radford, VA
February 19, 2022; 4:30 pm, ESPN+		North Carolina A&T	W 64–63	15–10 (8–6)	Gore Arena (1,960); Buies Creek, NC
February 23, 2022; 7:00 pm, ESPN+		at Hampton	L 66–68	15–11 (8–7)	Hampton Convocation Center (2,345); Hampton, VA
February 26, 2022; 4:30 pm, ESPN+		Longwood	L 55–60	15–12 (8–8)	Gore Arena (1,563); Buies Creek, NC
Big South tournament
March 2, 2022; 8:00 pm, ESPN+	(6)	vs. (11) Presbyterian; First round	W 75–72 ^{2OT}	16–12	Bojangles Coliseum (2,661); Charlotte, NC
March 4, 2022; 8:00 pm, ESPN+	(6)	vs. (3) Gardner-Webb; Quarterfinals	L 53–54	16–13	Bojangles Coliseum; Charlotte, NC
*Non-conference game. ^{#}Rankings from AP Poll. (#) Tournament seedings in parentheses. All times are in Eastern.
