= 2021–22 Hampton Pirates basketball team =

American college basketball season

2021–22 Hampton Pirates men's basketball
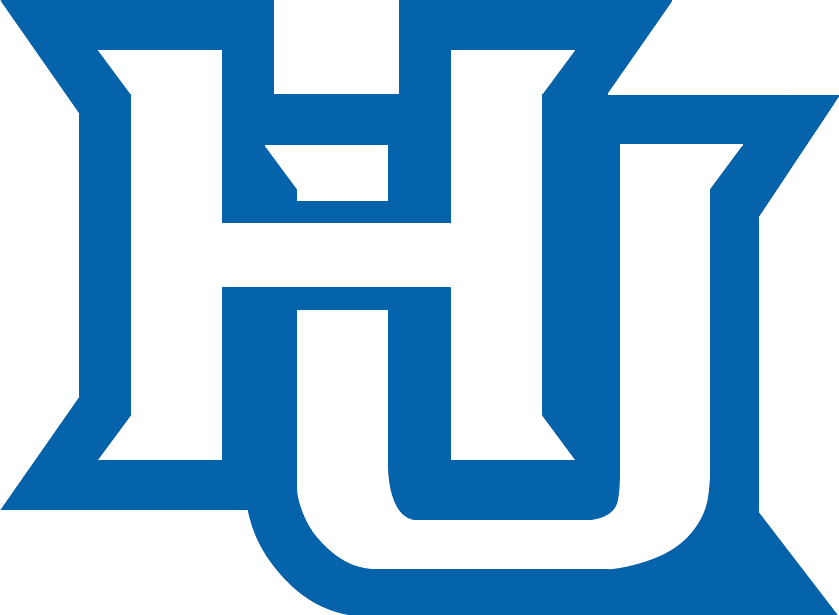
- Conference: Big South Conference
- Record: 9–19 (5–11 Big South)
- Head coach: Edward Joyner Jr. (13th season)
- Associate head coach: Darryl Sharp
- Assistant coaches: Matthew Hamilton; Keith Coutreyer
- Home arena: Hampton Convocation Center

2021–22 Big South men's basketball standings
	Conf.				Overall
Team	W		L	PCT	W		L	PCT
North
Longwood †	15	–	1	.938	26	–	7	.788
Campbell	8	–	8	.500	16	–	13	.552
High Point	7	–	9	.438	14	–	18	.438
Radford	7	–	9	.438	11	–	18	.379
North Carolina A&T	6	–	10	.375	12	–	20	.375
Hampton	5	–	11	.313	9	–	19	.321
South
Winthrop	14	–	2	.875	23	–	9	.719
Gardner–Webb	11	–	5	.688	18	–	13	.581
USC Upstate	10	–	6	.625	15	–	17	.469
UNC Asheville	8	–	8	.500	17	–	15	.531
Presbyterian	4	–	12	.250	12	–	20	.375
Charleston Southern	1	–	15	.063	6	–	25	.194
† 2022 Big South tournament winner

The 2021–22 Hampton Pirates men's basketball team represented Hampton University in the 2021–22 NCAA Division I men's basketball season. The Pirates, led by 13th-year head coach Edward Joyner Jr., played their home games at the Hampton Convocation Center in Hampton, Virginia as members of the Big South Conference. They finished the season 9–19, 5–11 in Big South play, to finish in last place in the North Division. As the No. 10 seed in the Big South tournament, they lost to High Point in the first round.

The season marked the school's last season as a member of the Big South as the Pirates joined the Colonial Athletic Association in 2022.

== Previous season ==
In a season limited due to the ongoing COVID-19 pandemic, the Pirates finished the 2020–21 season 11–14, 9–9 in Big South play, to finish in seventh place. They lost to Radford in the quarterfinals of the Big South tournament.

== Roster ==
2021–22 Hampton Pirates men's basketball team
Players
Coaches

Pos.	#	Name	Height	Weight	Year	Hometown
G	0	Marquis Godwin	6 ft 5 in (1.96 m)	195 lb (88 kg)	Jr	Hampton, VA
G	1	Russell (Deuce) Dean	6 ft 4 in (1.93 m)	200 lb (91 kg)	So	Columbia, SC
F	3	Najee Garvin	6 ft 8 in (2.03 m)	—	GS	Red Bank, SC
G	4	Raymond Jr. Bethea	6 ft 5 in (1.96 m)	200 lb (91 kg)	Jr	Atlantic City, NJ
F	5	Dajour Dickens	7 ft 1 in (2.16 m)	215 lb (98 kg)	Jr	Hampton, VA
G	11	Amir Nesbitt	6 ft 1 in (1.85 m)	180 lb (82 kg)	Fr	Newport News, VA
G	12	Johquin (Pinky) Wiley	6 ft 0 in (1.83 m)	—	GS	Chesterfield, VA
G/F	13	DeAngelo Epps	6 ft 5 in (1.96 m)	—	Jr	Charlotte, NC
G	20	Tyler Chatman	6 ft 2 in (1.88 m)	180 lb (82 kg)	Fr	Suffolk, VA
F	21	Luc Therrien	6 ft 10 in (2.08 m)	—	Fr	Vancouver, BC
G/F	23	Daniel Banister	6 ft 5 in (1.96 m)	190 lb (86 kg)	So	Chesapeake, VA
G	25	Bryce Earle	6 ft 0 in (1.83 m)	—	So	Columbia, SC
G	30	Mario Jr. Haskett	6 ft 2 in (1.88 m)	—	GS	Chesterfield, VA
F	32	Najee Thomas	6 ft 10 in (2.08 m)	210 lb (95 kg)	Jr	Fayetteville, NC

Head coach

- Edward Joyner Jr. (Hampton)

Assistant coach(es)

- Darryl Sharp (Bloomsburg)
- Matthew Hamilton (Appalachian State)
- Keith Coutreyer (Washington Adventist)

Legend

- (C) Team captain
- (S) Suspended
- (I) Ineligible
- (W) Walk-on
- Injured
- Current redshirt

Roster
Last update: January 18, 2022

== Schedule and results ==
Date time, TV	Rank^{#}	Opponent^{#}	Result	Record	Site (attendance) city, state
Non-conference regular season
November 9, 2021*; 7:00 p.m., ESPN+		Mid-Atlantic Christian	W 101–51	1–0	Hampton Convocation Center (2,511); Hampton, VA
November 13, 2021*; 7:30 p.m., ESPN+		Regent	W 70–56	2–0	Hampton Convocation Center (2,936); Hampton, VA
November 16, 2021*; 7:00 p.m.		at Towson	L 54–78	2–1	SECU Arena (1,742); Towson, MD
November 19, 2021*; 7:30 p.m., ESPN+		at Wofford	L 60–77	2–2	Jerry Richardson Indoor Stadium (1,025); Spartanburg, SC
November 20, 2021*; 5:00 p.m., ESPN+		Georgia Southern	L 66–86	2–3	Hampton Convocation Center (70); Hampton, VA
November 24, 2021*; 7:00 p.m., ESPN+		at South Florida	L 52–58	2–4	Yuengling Center (2,175); Tampa, FL
November 28, 2021*; 8:00 p.m., ESPN+		vs. Norfolk State; HBCU Challenge hosted by Chris Paul	L 61–70	2–5	Footprint Center (2,103); Phoenix, AZ
November 29, 2021*; 8:30 p.m., ESPNU		vs. Morgan State; HBCU Challenge hosted by Chris Paul	L 47–60	2–6	Footprint Center (720); Phoenix, AZ
December 4, 2021*; 5:30 p.m., ESPN+		Norfolk State	W 58–57	3–6	Hampton Convocation Center (2,162); Hampton, VA
December 9, 2021*; 7:00 p.m.		at William & Mary	W 54–53	4–6	Kaplan Arena (2,007); Williamsburg, VA
December 12, 2021*; 2:00 p.m.		at Loyola (MD)	L 54–67	4–7	Reitz Arena (534); Baltimore, MD
December 18, 2021*; 1:00 p.m.		at North Carolina Central; Legacy Classic hosted by Michael B. Jordan	Canceled due to COVID-19 issues		Prudential Center; Newark, NJ
December 22, 2021*; 4:00 p.m., ESPN+		VMI	Canceled due to COVID-19 issues		Hampton Convocation Center; Hampton, VA
December 30, 2021*; 7:00 p.m., ESPN+		at Howard; The Real HU	Canceled due to COVID-19 issues		Hampton Convocation Center; Hampton, VA
Big South Conference regular season
January 8, 2022; 2:00 p.m., ESPN+		at Gardner–Webb	L 69–78	4–8 (0–1)	Paul Porter Arena (238); Boiling Springs, NC
January 12, 2022; 7:00 p.m., ESPN+		at North Carolina A&T	L 59–67	4–9 (0–2)	Corbett Sports Center (3,092); Greensboro, NC
January 19, 2022; 6:30 p.m., ESPN+		at Radford	L 51–54	4–10 (0–3)	Dedmon Center (1,131); Radford, VA
January 22, 2022; 4:00 p.m., ESPN+		High Point	W 68–64 ^{OT}	5–10 (1–3)	Hampton Convocation Center (0); Hampton, VA
January 24, 2022; 6:00 p.m., ESPN+		Longwood; Rescheduled from January 5	L 49–73	5–11 (1–4)	Hampton Convocation Center (2,120); Hampton, VA
January 26, 2022; 7:00 p.m., ESPN3		at Campbell	L 60–75	5–12 (1–5)	John W. Pope Jr. Convocation Center (1,420); Buies Creek, NC
January 29, 2022; 5:30 p.m., ESPN+		at Charleston Southern	W 78–74	6–12 (2–5)	Buccaneer Field House (537); North Charleston, SC
February 2, 2022; 7:00 p.m., ESPN3		USC Upstate	L 78–85	6–13 (2–6)	Hampton Convocation Center (2,123); Hampton, VA
February 5, 2022; 5:30 p.m., ESPN+		Winthrop	L 57–69	6–14 (2–7)	Hampton Convocation Center (1,500); Hampton, VA
February 7, 2022; 7:00 p.m., ESPN+		Presbyterian; Rescheduled from January 15	W 74–69	7–14 (3–7)	Hampton Convocation Center (225); Hampton, VA
February 9, 2022; 6:30 p.m., ESPN3		at UNC Asheville	L 53–69	7–15 (3–8)	Kimmel Arena (572); Asheville, NC
February 12, 2022; 5:30 p.m., ESPN3		Radford	L 54–60	7–16 (3–9)	Hampton Convocation Center (3,146); Hampton, VA
February 16, 2022; 7:00 p.m., ESPN+		North Carolina A&T	W 93–82	8–16 (4–9)	Hampton Convocation Center (456); Hampton, VA
February 19, 2022; 3:00 p.m., ESPN+		at Longwood	L 72–76	8–17 (4–10)	Willett Hall (1,814); Farmville, VA
February 23, 2022; 7:00 p.m., ESPN+		Campbell	W 68–66	9–17 (5–10)	Hampton Convocation Center (2,345); Hampton, VA
February 26, 2022; 2:00 p.m., ESPN+		at High Point	L 77–88	9–18 (5–11)	Qubein Center (4,550); High Point, NC
Big South tournament
March 2, 2022; 6:00 p.m., ESPN+	(10)	vs. (7) High Point; First round	L 77–84 ^{OT}	9–19	Bojangles Coliseum (0); Charlotte, NC
*Non-conference game. ^{#}Rankings from AP poll. (#) Tournament seedings in parentheses. All times are in Eastern.
