= 2023–24 Kentucky Wildcats men's basketball team =

American college basketball season

2023–24 Kentucky Wildcats men's basketball

NCAA tournament, First Round
- Conference: Southeastern Conference

Ranking
- Coaches: No. 19
- AP: No. 20
- Record: 23–10 (13–5 SEC)
- Head coach: John Calipari (15th season)
- Assistant coaches: Orlando Antigua (8th overall, 3rd season); Ron Coleman (3rd season); Chuck Martin (1st season); John Welch (1st season)
- Home arena: Rupp Arena

2023–24 Southeastern Conference men's basketball standings
	Conf.				Overall
Team	W		L	PCT	W		L	PCT
No. 5 Tennessee	14	–	4	.778	27	–	9	.750
No. 20 Kentucky	13	–	5	.722	23	–	10	.697
No. 3т Alabama	13	–	5	.722	25	–	12	.676
No. 18 Auburn †	13	–	5	.722	27	–	8	.771
No. 25 South Carolina	13	–	5	.722	26	–	8	.765
Florida	11	–	7	.611	24	–	12	.667
Texas A&M	9	–	9	.500	21	–	15	.583
LSU	9	–	9	.500	17	–	16	.515
Mississippi State	8	–	10	.444	21	–	14	.600
Ole Miss	7	–	11	.389	20	–	12	.625
Georgia	6	–	12	.333	20	–	17	.541
Arkansas	6	–	12	.333	16	–	17	.485
Vanderbilt	4	–	14	.222	9	–	23	.281
Missouri	0	–	18	.000	8	–	24	.250
† 2024 SEC tournament winner Rankings from AP poll

The 2023–24 Kentucky Wildcats men's basketball team represented the University of Kentucky during the 2023–24 NCAA Division I men's basketball season. The Wildcats, who are founding members of the Southeastern Conference, played their home games at Rupp Arena and were led by John Calipari in his 15th and final season as head coach for the Wildcats. The Kentucky Wildcats men's basketball team drew an average home attendance of 19,928 in 2023–24, the 3rd highest in college basketball.

The Wildcats were ranked as one of the best three-point shooting teams throughout the season. However, they also were ranked as one of the worst defensive teams of the KenPom era, although Alabama had a worse rating in the same season. They reached the NCAA Tournament, where they lost to the Oakland Golden Grizzlies in the first round. However, despite the first round exit, this season was notable for the play of Reed Sheppard, who led the SEC in steals.

== Previous season ==
The Wildcats finished the 2022–23 season finished the season with a record of 21–10, 12–6 in SEC play to finish in third place in the SEC. As the number three seed in the SEC tournament, they would be upset in the quarterfinal round by Vanderbilt. They would go on to receive an at-large bid to the NCAA tournament where they would go on to defeat Providence in the first round before falling to Kansas State in the second round to finish the season with an overall record of 22–12.

== Offseason ==
=== Departures ===
Name	Number	Pos.	Height	Weight	Year	Hometown	Reason for departure
Jacob Toppin	0	F	6'9"	205	Senior	Brooklyn, NY	Declared for 2023 NBA draft
CJ Fredrick	1	F	6'3"	185	RS Senior	Cincinnati, OH	Transferred to Cincinnati
Sahvir Wheeler	2	G	5'9"	180	Senior	Houston, TX	Transferd to Washington
Daimion Collins	4	F	6'9"	210	Sophomore	Atlanta, TX	Transferred to LSU
Cason Wallace	22	G	6'3"	193	Freshman	Dallas, TX	Declared for 2023 NBA draft
Chris Livingston	24	F	6'6"	220	Freshman	Akron, OH	Declared for 2023 NBA draft
Oscar Tshiebwe	34	F	6'9"	260	Senior	Lubumbashi, DR Congo	Declared for 2023 NBA draft
Lance Ware	55	F	6'9"	235	Junior	Camden, NJ	Transferred to Villanova

=== Class of 2023 commitments ===
On November 20, 2021, Reed Sheppard verbally committed to UK over multiple offers, with Louisville and Virginia among the most active in attempting to recruit him. The son of former UK basketball players Jeff Sheppard and the former Stacey Reed, he was the first commitment to the 2023 recruiting class. At the time of his commitment, he was the #3 ranked combo guard in the 2023 class by 247 Sports. On November 14, 2022, D. J. Wagner, ranked as the top point guard in the class by ESPN and Rivals, committed to the University Of Kentucky, deciding over Louisville.

College recruiting information
Name	Hometown	School	Height	Weight	Commit date
Reed Sheppard; SG	London, KY	North Laurel (KY)	6 ft 3 in (1.91 m)	170 lb (77 kg)	Nov 20, 2021
Reed Sheppard; SG	Recruit ratings: Rivals: 247Sports: ESPN: (89)				
Rob Dillingham; PG	Simi Valley, CA	Donda Academy (CA)	6 ft 2 in (1.88 m)	165 lb (75 kg)	Jun 24, 2022
Rob Dillingham; PG	Recruit ratings: Rivals: 247Sports: ESPN: (95)				
Justin Edwards; SF	Philadelphia, PA	Imhotep Institute (PA)	6 ft 7 in (2.01 m)	180 lb (82 kg)	Jul 25, 2022
Justin Edwards; SF	Recruit ratings: Rivals: 247Sports: ESPN: (91)				
Jordan Burks; SF	Decatur, AL	Hillcrest Prep (AZ)	6 ft 8 in (2.03 m)	200 lb (91 kg)	Jun 12, 2023
Jordan Burks; SF	Recruit ratings: Rivals: 247Sports: ESPN: (82)				
Joey Hart; SG	Linton, IN	Linton-Stockton (IN)	6 ft 5 in (1.96 m)	180 lb (82 kg)	Jun 17, 2023
Joey Hart; SG	Recruit ratings: Rivals: 247Sports: ESPN: (79)				
Aaron Bradshaw; C	Roselle, NJ	Camden (NJ)	7 ft 0 in (2.13 m)	210 lb (95 kg)	Oct 14, 2022
Aaron Bradshaw; C	Recruit ratings: Rivals: 247Sports: ESPN: (94)				
Zvonimir Ivišić; C	Vodice, Croatia	SC Derby	7 ft 1 in (2.16 m)	220 lb (100 kg)	Aug 14, 2023
Zvonimir Ivišić; C	Recruit ratings: No ratings found				
D. J. Wagner; PG	Camden, NJ	Camden (NJ)	6 ft 3 in (1.91 m)	175 lb (79 kg)	Nov 14, 2022
D. J. Wagner; PG	Recruit ratings: Rivals: 247Sports: ESPN: (96)				
Overall recruit ranking:
Note: In many cases, Scout, Rivals, 247Sports, On3, and ESPN may conflict in their listings of height and weight.; In these cases, the average was taken. ESPN grades are on a 100-point scale.; Sources: "Kentucky 2023 Basketball Commitments". Rivals.; "2023 Kentucky Basketball Commits". ESPN.; "2023 Team Ranking". Rivals.; "Kentucky 2023 Basketball Commits". 247Sports.

== Roster ==
2023–24 Kentucky Wildcats men's basketball team
Players
Coaches

Pos.	#	Name	Height	Weight	Year	Previous school	Hometown
G	0	Rob Dillingham	6 ft 3 in (1.91 m)	176 lb (80 kg)	Fr	Overtime Elite	Hickory, NC
G	1	Justin Edwards	6 ft 8 in (2.03 m)	203 lb (92 kg)	Fr	Imhotep Institute	Philadelphia, PA
F	2	Aaron Bradshaw	7 ft 1 in (2.16 m)	226 lb (103 kg)	Fr	Camden	Roselle, NJ
G	3	Adou Thiero	6 ft 8 in (2.03 m)	222 lb (101 kg)	So	Quaker Valley	Leetsdale, PA
F	4	Tre Mitchell	6 ft 9 in (2.06 m)	231 lb (105 kg)	GS	West Virginia	Pittsburgh, PA
G	12	Antonio Reeves	6 ft 6 in (1.98 m)	195 lb (88 kg)	GS	Illinois State	Chicago, IL
G	13	Grant Darbyshire (W)	6 ft 3 in (1.91 m)	190 lb (86 kg)	So	Sycamore	Cincinnati, OH
F	14	Brennan Canada	6 ft 5 in (1.96 m)	200 lb (91 kg)	GS	George Rogers Clark	Mount Sterling, KY
G	15	Reed Sheppard	6 ft 3 in (1.91 m)	187 lb (85 kg)	Fr	North Laurel	London, KY
G	20	Joey Hart	6 ft 5 in (1.96 m)	203 lb (92 kg)	Fr	Linton-Stockton	Linton, IN
G	21	D. J. Wagner	6 ft 4 in (1.93 m)	192 lb (87 kg)	Fr	Camden	Camden, NJ
G	22	Walker Horn (W)	6 ft 3 in (1.91 m)	190 lb (86 kg)	So	Westlake	Austin, TX
G	23	Jordan Burks	6 ft 8 in (2.03 m)	202 lb (92 kg)	Fr	Hillcrest Prep	Decatur, AL
G	25	Kareem Watkins (W)	5 ft 8 in (1.73 m)	175 lb (79 kg)	Sr	Kingsway Regional	Camden, NJ
F	33	Ugonna Onyenso	7 ft 0 in (2.13 m)	247 lb (112 kg)	So	Putnam Science Academy	Owerri, Imo State, Nigeria
F	44	Zvonimir Ivišić	7 ft 2 in (2.18 m)	234 lb (106 kg)	Fr	SC Derby	Vodice, Croatia

Head coach

- John Calipari (Clarion)

Assistant coach(es)

- Orlando Antigua (Pittsburgh)
- Ron Coleman (Lamar)
- Chuck Martin (Monmouth)
- John Welch (UNLV)

Legend

- (C) Team captain
- (S) Suspended
- (I) Ineligible
- (W) Walk-on
- Injured
- Current redshirt

== Schedule and results ==
=== November ===
The season began on November 6, where Kentucky opened with New Mexico State. After having an 8-point lead at halftime, Kentucky cruised to an 86–46 win. On November 10, Kentucky defeated Texas A&M-Commerce (now East Texas A&M) 81–61, despite trailing 21–8 early in that game. Afterwards, Kentucky took on Kansas in the Champions Classic. After Kentucky led for most of the game, the Jayhawks came back late and ended up winning a close one, 89–84. The Wildcats returned home to take on Stonehill, and came away with a 101–67 victory. The Wildcats escaped a near-upset against St. Joseph’s, winning 96–88 in overtime. Kentucky faced Marshall in their next matchup, winning 118–82. Afterwards, the Wildcats faced Miami in the first-ever ACC-SEC Challenge. Kentucky won convincingly, defeating the Hurricanes 95–73. The Wildcats had a 6–1 record following the month of November.

=== December ===
The Wildcats opened the month of December against UNC Wilmington. Kentucky was upset by the Seahawks at home, by a score of 80–73. Afterwards, Kentucky traveled to Philadelphia to take on Penn. The Wildcats bounced back in an 81–66 win. The team traveled to Atlanta for the CBS Sports Classic to face off against North Carolina. In a back-and-forth game, the Wildcats defeated the Tar Heels 87–83. Kentucky ended the month of December with victories over rival Louisville, as well as Illinois State, in which Kentucky won convincingly in both games. The Cats finished the month of December with a record of 4–1, and their overall record stood at 10–2.

=== January ===
Kentucky opened up SEC play on January 6, against the Florida Gators. In a tight game, in which Florida had the lead for most of the game, Kentucky came back, and got a close 87–85 victory. Afterwards, Kentucky defeated Missouri by a score of 90–77. The Wildcats took their first loss in conference play when they lost to Texas A&M by a score of 97–92 in overtime. The Wildcats bounced back to defeat Mississippi State by a score of 90–77. Kentucky also went on to defeat Georgia 105–96, in the debut of Kentucky center Zvonimir Ivišić. However, Kentucky would lose two of their final three games of the month. The Wildcats would get blown out on the road at South Carolina by a score of 79–62. The Wildcats would also lose to Florida at home 94–91 in overtime. However, the Wildcats would beat Arkansas by a score of 63–57 in between those two games. The Wildcats finished the month of January with a record of 5–3, which brought their record to 15–5 overall.

=== February ===
The Wildcats opened the month of February at home against rival Tennessee. Kentucky would lose to the Volunteers by a score of 103–92. Kentucky bounced back on the road against Vanderbilt, winning convincingly, 109–77. Afterwards, Kentucky returned home for a non-conference game against Gonzaga. In a back-and-forth game, the Wildcats fell short 89–85. This was their 3rd straight loss at home, which was the first time this had occurred for Kentucky in the history of Rupp Arena. Kentucky broke the home losing streak the next game, however, as the Wildcats defeated Ole Miss, by a score of 75–63. Afterwards, Kentucky got a huge road win at Auburn, winning 70–59. The Wildcats would drop the next game, however, on the road to LSU. In a back-and-forth game, the Wildcats lost 75–74 on a buzzer beater by Tyrell Ward. The Wildcats rolled against Alabama, winning convincingly 117–95. The Wildcats ended the month with a 91–89 win over Mississippi State, off of a buzzer beater by Reed Sheppard. The Wildcats finished the month with a record of 5–3. The Wildcats had a conference record of 10–5 and an overall record of 20–8.

=== March ===
Kentucky opened up the month of March with a 111–102 home win over Arkansas in a back-and-forth game. The Wildcats closed out their home slate with a senior night win over Vanderbilt, 93–77. The Wildcats ended the regular season with an 85–81 win on the road at rival Tennessee. The Wildcats finished the regular season with an overall record of 23–8, and a conference record of 13–5.

=== Postseason ===
Kentucky entered the SEC Tournament as the #2 seed. They faced #7 Texas A&M in the SEC Tournament Quarterfinals. The Aggies once again defeated Kentucky, this time by a score of 97–87. On Selection Sunday, Kentucky got the #3 seed in the South Region of the NCAA Tournament. The region had Houston as the #1 seed and Marquette as the #2 seed. Kentucky’s first round matchup was against #14 Oakland in the first round. Kentucky was upset by Oakland, 80–76. This was Kentucky’s second loss to a double digit seed in a span of 3 years.

=== Calipari's departure ===
Immediately following the season, there were questions as to whether or not John Calipari would remain Kentucky’s head coach. Calipari had been criticized in recent years for his losses in the NCAA Tournament, specifically to St. Peter’s and Oakland. In early April, rumors spread that Calipari was going to leave Kentucky to take the job at Arkansas, which was open since Eric Musselman left Arkansas to take the job at USC. On April 8, it was announced that John Calipari would be leaving Kentucky after 15 years to become the new head coach of Arkansas. After about a week of a coaching search, Kentucky hired Mark Pope to become their next head coach.

Date time, TV	Rank^{#}	Opponent^{#}	Result	Record	High points	High rebounds	High assists	Site (attendance) city, state
Exhibition
July 12, 2023*; 1:30 p.m., CBSSN		vs. Germany	W 81–73	–	24 – Reeves	9 – Edwards	6 – Tied	Mattamy Athletic Centre; Toronto, Ontario
July 13, 2023*; 8:00 p.m., CBSSN		vs. Canada	W 93–69	–	23 – Reeves	6 – Tied	9 – Dillingham	Mattamy Athletic Centre; Toronto, Ontario
July 15, 2023*; 1:30 p.m., CBSSN		vs. Africa	W 104–92	–	27 – Reeves	8 – Mitchell	8 – Sheppard	Mattamy Athletic Centre; Toronto, Ontario
July 16, 2023*; 8:00 p.m., CBSSN		vs. Canada; Gold Medal game	W 89–72	–	23 – Edwards	11 – Mitchell	6 – Wagner	Mattamy Athletic Centre; Toronto, Ontario
October 27, 2023*; 7:00 p.m., SECN	No. 16	Georgetown (KY)	W 92–69	–	22 – Mitchell	9 – Mitchell	5 – Dillingham	Rupp Arena (18,454); Lexington, KY
November 2, 2023*; 7:00 p.m., SECN+/ESPN+	No. 16	Kentucky State	W 99–53	–	20 – Reeves	10 – Mitchell	7 – Wagner	Rupp Arena (18,739); Lexington, KY
Regular season
November 6, 2023*; 8:00 p.m., SECN	No. 16	New Mexico State	W 86–46	1–0	17 – Dillingham	9 – Mitchell	5 – Mitchell	Rupp Arena (18,438); Lexington, KY
November 10, 2023*; 7:00 p.m., SECN+/ESPN+	No. 16	Texas A&M–Commerce; Wildcat Challenge	W 81–61	2–0	21 – Reeves	8 – Mitchell	4 – Dillingham	Rupp Arena (19,646); Lexington, KY
November 14, 2023*; 9:30 p.m., ESPN	No. 17	vs. No. 1 Kansas; Champions Classic	L 84–89	2–1	24 – Reeves	12 – Thiero	3 – Tied	United Center (18,780); Chicago, IL
November 17, 2023*; 7:00 p.m., SECN+/ESPN+	No. 17	Stonehill; Wildcat Challenge	W 101–67	3–1	25 – Sheppard	5 – Tied	7 – Tied	Rupp Arena (18,960); Lexington, KY
November 20, 2023*; 7:00 p.m., SECN	No. 16	Saint Joseph's; Wildcat Challenge	W 96–88 ^{OT}	4–1	22 – Tied	6 – Mitchell	6 – Tied	Rupp Arena (18,680); Lexington, KY
November 24, 2023*; 7:00 p.m., SECN	No. 16	Marshall	W 118–82	5–1	28 – Wagner	7 – Tied	8 – Dillingham	Rupp Arena (20,246); Lexington, KY
November 28, 2023*; 7:30 p.m., ESPN	No. 12	No. 8 Miami (FL); ACC–SEC Challenge	W 95–73	6–1	21 – Sheppard	6 – Thiero	9 – Dillingham	Rupp Arena (20,119); Lexington, KY
December 2, 2023*; 4:00 p.m., SECN	No. 12	UNC Wilmington	L 73–80	6–2	25 – Sheppard	9 – Sheppard	6 – Sheppard	Rupp Arena (19,990); Lexington, KY
December 9, 2023*; 12:00 p.m., ESPN2	No. 16	vs. Penn; Malone's Classic	W 81–66	7–2	17 – Tied	11 – Bradshaw	7 – Wagner	Wells Fargo Center (9,007); Philadelphia, PA
December 16, 2023*; 5:30 p.m., CBS	No. 14	vs. No. 9 North Carolina; CBS Sports Classic/Rivalry	W 87–83	8–2	17 – Dillingham	6 – Tied	5 – Wagner	State Farm Arena (17,058); Atlanta, GA
December 21, 2023*; 6:00 p.m., ESPN	No. 9	at Louisville; Rivalry	W 95–76	9–2	30 – Reeves	12 – Mitchell	11 – Sheppard	KFC Yum! Center (17,293); Louisville, KY
December 29, 2023*; 7:00 p.m., SECN	No. 8	Illinois State	W 96–70	10–2	27 – Reeves	11 – Mitchell	7 – Dillingham	Rupp Arena (20,659); Lexington, KY
January 6, 2024; 12:30 p.m., ESPN	No. 6	at Florida; Rivalry	W 87–85	11–2 (1–0)	19 – Reeves	10 – Mitchell	3 – Wagner	O'Connell Center (10,106); Gainesville, FL
January 9, 2024; 7:00 p.m., ESPN	No. 6	Missouri	W 90–77	12–2 (2–0)	23 – Dillingham	14 – Mitchell	4 – Sheppard	Rupp Arena (20,086); Lexington, KY
January 13, 2024; 2:00 p.m., ESPN	No. 6	at Texas A&M	L 92–97 ^{OT}	12–3 (2–1)	22 – Reeves	13 – Mitchell	6 – Mitchell	Reed Arena (9,540); College Station, TX
January 17, 2024; 7:00 p.m., ESPN2	No. 8	Mississippi State	W 90–77	13–3 (3–1)	27 – Reeves	6 – Tied	6 – Sheppard	Rupp Arena (20,016); Lexington, KY
January 20, 2024; 6:00 p.m., SECN	No. 8	Georgia	W 105–96	14–3 (4–1)	23 – Mitchell	5 – Tied	10 – Wagner	Rupp Arena (20,283); Lexington, KY
January 23, 2024; 7:00 p.m., SECN	No. 6	at South Carolina	L 62–79	14–4 (4–2)	16 – Dillingham	8 – Bradshaw	3 – Wagner	Colonial Life Arena (18,000); Columbia, SC
January 27, 2024; 6:00 p.m., ESPN	No. 6	at Arkansas; College GameDay	W 63–57	15–4 (5–2)	24 – Reeves	11 – Mitchell	5 – Sheppard	Bud Walton Arena (19,200); Fayetteville, AR
January 31, 2024; 8:00 p.m., ESPN	No. 10	Florida; Rivalry	L 91–94 ^{OT}	15–5 (5–3)	24 – Sheppard	16 – Onyenso	6 – Sheppard	Rupp Arena (20,068); Lexington, KY
February 3, 2024; 8:30 p.m., ESPN	No. 10	No. 5 Tennessee; Rivalry	L 92–103	15–6 (5–4)	35 – Dillingham	6 – Tied	6 – Sheppard	Rupp Arena (20,265); Lexington, KY
February 6, 2024; 8:30 p.m., SECN	No. 17	at Vanderbilt	W 109–77	16–6 (6–4)	24 – Reeves	7 – Tied	9 – Dillingham	Memorial Gymnasium (11,678); Nashville, TN
February 10, 2024*; 4:00 p.m., CBS	No. 17	Gonzaga	L 85–89	16–7	21 – Sheppard	5 – Tied	3 – Tied	Rupp Arena (20,186); Lexington, KY
February 13, 2024; 9:00 p.m., ESPN	No. 22	Ole Miss	W 75–63	17–7 (7–4)	15 – Reeves	7 – Reeves	5 – Sheppard	Rupp Arena (20,064); Lexington, KY
February 17, 2024; 6:00 p.m., ESPN	No. 22	at No. 13 Auburn; College GameDay	W 70–59	18–7 (8–4)	22 – Reeves	11 – Onyenso	3 – Tied	Neville Arena (9,121); Auburn, AL
February 21, 2024; 9:00 p.m., ESPN	No. 17	at LSU	L 74–75	18–8 (8–5)	25 – Reeves	9 – Thiero	2 – Tied	Pete Maravich Assembly Center (9,493); Baton Rouge, LA
February 24, 2024; 4:00 p.m., CBS	No. 17	No. 13 Alabama	W 117–95	19–8 (9–5)	28 – Edwards	6 – Sheppard	6 – Sheppard	Rupp Arena (20,342); Lexington, KY
February 27, 2024; 7:00 p.m., ESPN	No. 16	at Mississippi State	W 91–89	20–8 (10–5)	32 – Sheppard	5 – Sheppard	7 – Sheppard	Humphrey Coliseum (9,266); Starkville, MS
March 2, 2024; 1:30 p.m., CBS	No. 16	Arkansas	W 111–102	21–8 (11–5)	22 – Reeves	9 – Ivisic	5 – Tied	Rupp Arena (20,322); Lexington, KY
March 6, 2024; 9:00 p.m., SECN	No. 15	Vanderbilt	W 93–77	22–8 (12–5)	23 – Dillingham	6 – Tied	11 – Sheppard	Rupp Arena (20,332); Lexington, KY
March 9, 2024; 4:00 p.m., CBS	No. 15	at No. 4 Tennessee; Rivalry	W 85–81	23–8 (13–5)	27 – Tied	7 – Reeves	5 – Sheppard	Thompson–Boling Arena (22,206); Knoxville, TN
SEC tournament
March 15, 2024; 7:00 p.m., SECN	(2) No. 9	vs. (7) Texas A&M; Quarterfinals	L 87–97	23–9	27 – Dillingham	9 – Mitchell	7 – Dillingham	Bridgestone Arena; Nashville, TN
NCAA tournament
March 21, 2024*; 7:10 pm, CBS	(3 S) No. 12	vs. (14 S) Oakland; First Round	L 76–80	23–10	27 – Reeves	13 – Mitchell	4 – Sheppard	PPG Paints Arena; Pittsburgh, PA
*Non-conference game. ^{#}Rankings from AP Poll. (#) Tournament seedings in parentheses. S=South region. All times are in Eastern Time.

== Rankings ==
Ranking movements Legend: ██ Increase in ranking ██ Decrease in ranking т = Tied with team above or below
	Week																				
Poll	Pre	1	2	3	4	5	6	7	8	9	10	11	12	13	14	15	16	17	18	19	Final
AP	16	17	16	12	16	14	9	8	6	6	8	6	10	17	22	17	16	15	9	12	20
Coaches	16	16	16	12	17	15	9	10	6	6	10	6т	8	15	20	17	15	13	9	12	19
