= Kentucky Wildcats men's basketball statistical leaders =

The Kentucky Wildcats men's basketball statistical leaders are individual statistical leaders of the Kentucky Wildcats men's basketball program in various categories, including points, three-pointers, rebounds, assists, steals, and blocks. Within those areas, the lists identify single-game, single-season, and career leaders. The Wildcats represent the University of Kentucky (UK) in the NCAA Division I Southeastern Conference.

Kentucky began competing in intercollegiate basketball in 1902. However, the school's record book does not generally list records from before the 1950s, as records from before this period are often incomplete and inconsistent. Since scoring was much lower in this era, and teams played much fewer games during a typical season, it is likely that few or no players from this era would appear on these lists anyway.

Official NCAA records date only to the 1937–38 season, the start of what it calls the "modern era" of basketball. That season was the first after the center jump after each made basket was abolished. Weekly recording of scoring leaders started in 1947–48. Rebounding and assists were added in the 1950–51 season. While rebounding has been recorded in each subsequent season, the NCAA stopped recording assists after the 1951–52 season, and did not reinstate assists as an official statistic until 1983–84. Blocks and steals were added in 1985–86, and three-pointers were first officially recorded in 1986–87, the first season in which the three-pointer was mandatory throughout NCAA Division I men's basketball. Apart from three-pointers, which have only been recorded since the three-point shot was nationally adopted, UK's record book includes all seasons, whether or not the NCAA officially recorded those statistics in the relevant seasons.

These lists are updated through the first round of the 2026 NCAA tournament.

== Scoring ==
Career
Rank	Player	Points	Seasons
1	Dan Issel	2,138	1967-68 1968-69 1969-70
2	Kenny Walker	2,080	1982–83 1983–84 1984–85 1985–86
3	Jack Givens	2,038	1974–75 1975–76 1976–77 1977–78
4	Keith Bogans	1,923	1999–00 2000–01 2001–02 2002–03
5	Tony Delk	1,890	1992–93 1993–94 1994–95 1995–96
6	Jamal Mashburn	1,843	1990–91 1991–92 1992–93
7	Kevin Grevey	1,801	1972–73 1973–74 1974–75
8	Tayshaun Prince	1,775	1998–99 1999–00 2000–01 2001–02
9	Cotton Nash	1,770	1961–62 1962–63 1963–64
10	Alex Groza	1,744	1944–45 1946–47 1947–48 1948–49

Season
Rank	Player	Points	Season
1	Dan Issel	948	1969–70
2	Jodie Meeks	854	2008–09
3	Jamal Mashburn	767	1991–92
4	Malik Monk	754	2016–17
5	Dan Issel	746	1968–69
6	Kevin Grevey	730	1974–75
7	Ron Mercer	725	1996–97
8	Kenny Walker	721	1985–86
9	Jamal Murray	720	2015–16
10	Jamal Mashburn	714	1992–93

Single game
Rank	Player	Points	Season	Opponent
1	Jodie Meeks	54	2008–09	Tennessee
2	Dan Issel	53	1969–70	Ole Miss
3	Dan Issel	51	1969–70	LSU
	Cliff Hagan	51	1953–54	Temple
5	Bob Burrow	50	1955–56	LSU
6	Malik Monk	47	2016–17	North Carolina
	Dan Issel	47	1969–70	Alabama
8	Jodie Meeks	46	2008–09	Appalachian State
9	Jodie Meeks	45	2008–09	Arkansas
10	Dan Issel	44	1969–70	Notre Dame (NCAA)

== Three-pointers ==
Career
Rank	Player	3FG	Seasons
1	Tony Delk	283	1992–93 1993–94 1994–95 1995–96
2	Keith Bogans	254	1999–00 2000–01 2001–02 2002–03
3	Tayshaun Prince	204	1998–99 1999–00 2000–01 2001–02
4	Gerald Fitch	199	2000–01 2001–02 2002–03 2003–04
5	Derrick Miller	191	1986–87 1987–88 1988–89 1989–90
6	Travis Ford	190	1991–92 1992–93 1993–94
7	Joe Crawford	186	2004–05 2005–06 2006–07 2007–08
8	Ramel Bradley	177	2004–05 2005–06 2006–07 2007–08
	Jodie Meeks	177	2007–08 2008–09
10	Darius Miller	175	2008–09 2009–10 2010–11 2011–12

Season
Rank	Player	3FG	Season
1	Jodie Meeks	117	2008–09
2	Jamal Murray	113	2015–16
3	Malik Monk	104	2016–17
4	Travis Ford	101	1992–93
5	Derrick Miller	99	1989–90
6	Tony Delk	95	1993–94
7	Tony Delk	93	1995–96
	Koby Brea	93	2024–25
9	Kellan Grady	88	2021–22
10	Brandon Knight	87	2010–11

Single game
Rank	Player	3FG	Season	Opponent
1	Jodie Meeks	10	2008–09	Tennessee
2	Tony Delk	9	1995–96	TCU
	Jodie Meeks	9	2008–09	Appalachian State
4	8 times by 6 players	8	Most recent: Immanuel Quickley, 2019–20 vs. Texas A&M	

== Rebounds ==
Career
Rank	Player	Rebounds	Seasons
1	Dan Issel	1,078	1967–68 1968–69 1969–70
2	Frank Ramsey	1,038	1950–51 1951–52 1953–54
3	Cliff Hagan	1,035	1950–51 1951–52 1953–54
4	Johnny Cox	1,004	1956–57 1957–58 1958–59
5	Cotton Nash	962	1961–62 1962–63 1963–64
6	Oscar Tshiebwe	952	2021–22 2022–23
7	Kenny Walker	942	1982–83 1983–84 1984–85 1985–86
8	Chuck Hayes	910	2001–02 2002–03 2003–04 2004–05
9	Sam Bowie	843	1979–80 1980–81 1983–84
10	Rick Robey	838	1974–75 1975–76 1976–77 1977–78

Season
Rank	Player	Rebounds	Season
1	Bill Spivey	567	1950–51
2	Cliff Hagan	528	1951–52
3	Oscar Tshiebwe	515	2021–22
4	Bob Burrow	459	1954–55
5	Oscar Tshiebwe	437	2022–23
6	Frank Ramsey	434	1950–51
7	Julius Randle	417	2013–14
8	Anthony Davis	415	2011–12
9	Frank Ramsey	383	1951–52
10	Dan Issel	381	1968–69

Single game
Rank	Player	Rebounds	Season	Opponent
1	Bob Burrow	34	1955–56	Temple
	Bill Spivey	34	1950–51	Xavier
3	Cotton Nash	30	1963–64	Ole Miss
	Cotton Nash	30	1961–62	Temple
5	Dan Issel	29	1968–69	LSU
6	Mike Phillips	28	1975–76	Tennessee
	Oscar Tshiebwe	28	2021–22	Western Kentucky
8	Oscar Tshiebwe	25	2022–23	Providence
9	Dan Issel	24	1968–69	Xavier
	Dan Issel	24	1967–68	Florida
	Don Mills	24	1959–60	USC
	Oscar Tshiebwe	24	2022–23	Georgia

== Assists ==
Career
Rank	Player	Assists	Seasons
1	Dirk Minniefield	646	1979–80 1980–81 1981–82 1982–83
2	Anthony Epps	544	1993–94 1994–95 1995–96 1996–97
3	Roger Harden	498	1982–83 1983–84 1984–85 1985–86
4	Wayne Turner	494	1995–96 1996–97 1997–98 1998–99
5	Sean Woods	482	1989–90 1990–91 1991–92
6	Kyle Macy	470	1977–78 1978–79 1979–80
7	Cliff Hawkins	468	2000–01 2001–02 2002–03 2003–04
8	Ed Davender	436	1984–85 1985–86 1986–87 1987–88
9	Travis Ford	428	1991–92 1992–93 1993–94
10	Tyler Ulis	381	2014–15 2015–16

Season
Rank	Player	Assists	Season
1	Tyler Ulis	246	2015–16
2	John Wall	241	2009–10
3	Roger Harden	232	1985–86
4	Sahvir Wheeler	207	2021–22
5	Anthony Epps	193	1996–97
	Travis Ford	193	1993–94
7	Marquis Teague	191	2011–12
	Ashton Hagans	191	2019–20
9	Shai Gilgeous-Alexander	189	2017–18
10	Dirk Minniefield	188	1981–82

Single game
Rank	Player	Assists	Season	Opponent
1	TyTy Washington Jr.	17	2021-22	Georgia
2	John Wall	16	2009–10	Hartford
3	Travis Ford	15	1993–94	Eastern Kentucky
4	Sahvir Wheeler	14	2021–22	North Florida
	Tyler Ulis	14	2015–16	LSU
	John Wall	14	2009–10	UNC Asheville
	Dickey Beal	14	1983–84	BYU
	Dirk Minniefield	14	1982–83	Villanova
9	Anthony Epps	13	1994–95	LSU
	Rodrick Rhodes	13	1992–93	Morehead State
	Dirk Minniefield	13	1981–82	Auburn
	Dirk Minniefield	13	1979–80	Mississippi State

== Steals ==
Career
Rank	Player	Steals	Seasons
1	Wayne Turner	238	1995–96 1996–97 1997–98 1998–99
2	Tony Delk	201	1992–93 1993–94 1994–95 1995–96
3	Cliff Hawkins	199	2000–01 2001–02 2002–03 2003–04
4	Ed Davender	191	1984–85 1985–86 1986–87 1987–88
5	Jared Prickett	187	1992–93 1993–94 1994–95 1995–96 1996–97
6	Anthony Epps	184	1993–94 1994–95 1995–96 1996–97
7	John Pelphrey	173	1988–89 1989–90 1990–91 1991–92
8	Chuck Hayes	170	2001–02 2002–03 2003–04 2004–05
9	Rodrick Rhodes	163	1992–93 1993–94 1994–95
10	Rajon Rondo	156	2004–05 2005–06
	Dirk Minniefield	156	1979–80 1980–81 1981–82 1982–83

Season
Rank	Player	Steals	Season
1	Rajon Rondo	87	2004–05
2	Reed Sheppard	82	2023–24
3	Wayne Turner	79	1996–97
4	Rodrick Rhodes	76	1993–94
5	Cliff Hawkins	74	2003–04
6	Rajon Rondo	69	2005–06
	Kyle Macy	69	1978–79
8	Anthony Epps	68	1996–97
9	Tony Delk	67	1995–96
10	John Wall	66	2009–10
	Jared Prickett	66	1996–97
	Ron Mercer	66	1996–97

Single game
Rank	Player	Steals	Season	Opponent
1	Ashton Hagans	8	2018–19	North Carolina
	Rajon Rondo	8	2004–05	Mississippi State
	Wayne Turner	8	1997–98	George Washington
	Cason Wallace	8	2022-23	Michigan State
5	Alex Wilkins	7	2026–27	Manhattan
	Jared Prickett	7	1992–93	Tennessee
	Reggie Hanson	7	1990–91	Ole Miss
	John Pelphrey	7	1989–90	LSU
	Winston Bennett	7	1984–85	Mississippi State

== Blocks ==
Career
Rank	Player	Blocks	Seasons
1	Jamaal Magloire	268	1996–97 1997–98 1998–99 1999–00
2	Willie Cauley-Stein	233	2012–13 2013–14 2014–15
3	Melvin Turpin	226	1980–81 1981–82 1982–83 1983–84
4	Sam Bowie	218	1979–80 1980–81 1983–84
5	Andre Riddick	212	1991–92 1992–93 1993–94 1994–95
6	Anthony Davis	186	2011–12
7	Perry Stevenson	159	2006–07 2007–08 2008–09 2009–10
8	Jules Camara	155	1998–99 1999–00 2001–02 2002–03
9	Patrick Patterson	152	2007–08 2008–09 2009–10
10	Nick Richards	146	2017–18 2018–19 2019–20

Season
Rank	Player	Blocks	Season
1	Anthony Davis	186	2011–12
2	Willie Cauley-Stein	106	2013–14
	Nerlens Noel	106	2012–13
4	Karl-Anthony Towns	88	2014–15
5	Andre Riddick	83	1993–94
	Melvin Turpin	83	1982–83
7	Sam Bowie	80	1980–81
8	Jamaal Magloire	79	1996–97
9	Nazr Mohammed	75	1997–98
10	Sam Bowie	73	1979–80

Single game
Rank	Player	Blocks	Season	Opponent
1	Nerlens Noel	12	2012–13	Ole Miss
2	Ugonna Onyenso	10	2023–24	Ole Miss
3	Willie Cauley-Stein	9	2013–14	Boise State
	Willie Cauley-Stein	9	2013–14	Providence
	Andre Riddick	9	1992–93	LSU
	Sam Bowie	9	1980–81	Vanderbilt
7	6 times by 5 players	8	Most recent: Ugonna Onyenso, 2023–24 vs. Florida	
