= 2022–23 Kentucky Wildcats men's basketball team =

American college basketball season

2022–23 Kentucky Wildcats men's basketball

NCAA tournament, Second Round
- Conference: Southeastern Conference
- Record: 22–12 (12–6 SEC)
- Head coach: John Calipari (14th season)
- Assistant coaches: Orlando Antigua (7th overall, 2nd season); Ron Coleman (2nd season); K. T. Turner (1st season)
- Home arena: Rupp Arena

2022–23 Southeastern Conference men's basketball standings
	Conf.				Overall
Team	W		L	PCT	W		L	PCT
No. 1 Alabama†	16	–	2	.889	31	–	6	.838
No. 17 Texas A&M	15	–	3	.833	25	–	10	.714
Kentucky	12	–	6	.667	22	–	12	.647
No. 23 Missouri	11	–	7	.611	25	–	10	.714
No. 20 Tennessee	11	–	7	.611	25	–	11	.694
Vanderbilt	11	–	7	.611	22	–	15	.595
Auburn	10	–	8	.556	21	–	13	.618
Florida	9	–	9	.500	16	–	17	.485
Mississippi State	8	–	10	.444	21	–	13	.618
Arkansas	8	–	10	.444	22	–	14	.611
Georgia	6	–	12	.333	16	–	16	.500
South Carolina	4	–	14	.222	11	–	21	.344
Ole Miss	3	–	15	.167	12	–	21	.364
LSU	2	–	16	.111	14	–	19	.424
† 2023 SEC tournament winner Rankings from AP poll

The 2022–23 Kentucky Wildcats men's basketball team represented the University of Kentucky in the 2022–23 NCAA Division I men's basketball season. The Wildcats, founding members of the Southeastern Conference, played their home games at Rupp Arena and were led by John Calipari in his 14th season as head coach. They finished the season 21–10, 12–6 in SEC play to finish in third place. As the No. 3 seed in the SEC tournament, they were upset in the quarterfinal round by Vanderbilt. They received an at-large bid to the NCAA tournament, where they defeated Providence in the first round before falling to Kansas State in the second round to finish the season with a final record of 22–12.

== Previous season ==
The Wildcats finished the 2021–22 season 26–8, 14–4 in SEC play to finish a tie for second place. As the No. 3 seed in the SEC tournament, they defeated Vanderbilt in the quarterfinals before losing to Tennessee in the semifinals. They received an at large bid to the NCAA tournament as the No. 2 seed in the East region. The Wildcats became just the 10th #2 seed to lose in the First Round of the NCAA Tournament, losing to No. 15-seeded Saint Peter's 85–79 in overtime. It also marked the first time Kentucky had suffered a First Round exit under Calipari.

== Offseason ==
=== Player departures ===
Name	Number	Pos.	Height	Weight	Year	Hometown	Reason left
Dontaie Allen	11	Guard	6'6"	205	Sophomore	Falmouth, KY	Transferred to Western Kentucky
Kellan Grady	31	Guard	6'5"	205	Senior	Boston, MA	Completed college eligibility
Bryce Hopkins	23	Power forward	6'7"	220	Freshman	Oak Park, IL	Transferred to Providence
Davion Mintz	10	Guard	6'3"	195	Senior	Charlotte, NC	Completed college eligibility
Keion Brooks Jr.	12	Forward	6'7"	210	Junior	Fort Wayne, IN	Transferred to Washington
Zan Payne	20	Forward	6'4"	215	Junior	Lexington, KY	Transferred to Louisville
TyTy Washington Jr.	13	Guard	6'3"	197	Freshman	Phoenix, AZ	NBA Draft
Shaedon Sharpe	21	Guard	6'6"	200	(redshirt) Freshman	London, ON	NBA Draft

=== Class of 2022 signees ===
The Wildcats signed a four-man class of Chris Livingston, Cason Wallace, Adou Thiero, and Ugonna Onyenso. Sharpe enrolled in January to join the 2022 team.

College recruiting information
Name	Hometown	School	Height	Weight	Commit date CordellCordellCordell
Chris Livingston; SF	Akron, OH	Oak Hill Academy (VA)	6 ft 7 in (2.01 m)	210 lb (95 kg)	Nov 10, 2021
Chris Livingston; SF	Recruit ratings: Rivals: 247Sports: ESPN: (91)				
Ugonna Onyenso; C	Owerri, Nigeria	Putnam Science Academy (CT)	7 ft 0 in (2.13 m)	220 lb (100 kg)	Aug 1, 2022
Ugonna Onyenso; C	Recruit ratings: Rivals: 247Sports: ESPN: (89)				
Adou Thiero; SG / PG	Leetsdale, PA	Quaker Valley (PA)	6 ft 5 in (1.96 m)	180 lb (82 kg)	May 8, 2022
Adou Thiero; SG / PG	Recruit ratings: Rivals: 247Sports: ESPN: (80)				
Cason Wallace; SG / PG	Dallas, TX	Richardson (TX)	6 ft 4 in (1.93 m)	190 lb (86 kg)	Nov 10, 2021
Cason Wallace; SG / PG	Recruit ratings: Rivals: 247Sports: ESPN: (92)				
Overall recruit ranking: Rivals: 2nd 247Sports: 8th ESPN: 1st
Note: In many cases, Scout, Rivals, 247Sports, On3, and ESPN may conflict in their listings of height and weight.; In these cases, the average was taken. ESPN grades are on a 100-point scale.; Sources: "Kentucky 2022 Basketball Commitments". Rivals.; "2022 Kentucky Basketball Commits". ESPN.; "2022 Team Ranking". Rivals.; "Kentucky 2022 Basketball Commits". 247Sports.

=== Class of 2023 commitments ===
On November 20, 2021, Reed Sheppard verbally committed to UK over multiple offers, with Louisville and Virginia among the most active in attempting to recruit him. The son of former UK basketball players Jeff Sheppard and the former Stacey Reed, he was the first commitment to the 2023 recruiting class. At the time of his commitment, he was the #3 ranked combo guard in the 2023 class by 247 Sports. On November 14, 2022, D. J. Wagner, ranked as the top point guard in the class by ESPN and Rivals, committed to the University Of Kentucky, deciding over Louisville.

College recruiting information
Name	Hometown	School	Height	Weight	Commit date
Reed Sheppard; SG	London, KY	North Laurel (KY)	6 ft 3 in (1.91 m)	170 lb (77 kg)	Nov 20, 2021
Reed Sheppard; SG	Recruit ratings: Rivals: 247Sports: ESPN: (89)				
Rob Dillingham; PG	Simi Valley, CA	Donda Academy (CA)	6 ft 2 in (1.88 m)	165 lb (75 kg)	Jun 24, 2022
Rob Dillingham; PG	Recruit ratings: Rivals: 247Sports: ESPN: (95)				
Justin Edwards; SF	Philadelphia, PA	Imhotep Institute (PA)	6 ft 7 in (2.01 m)	180 lb (82 kg)	Jul 25, 2022
Justin Edwards; SF	Recruit ratings: Rivals: 247Sports: ESPN: (91)				
Aaron Bradshaw; C	Roselle, NJ	Camden, NJ	7 ft 0 in (2.13 m)	210 lb (95 kg)	Oct 14, 2022
Aaron Bradshaw; C	Recruit ratings: Rivals: 247Sports: ESPN: (94)				
D. J. Wagner; PG	Camden, NJ	Camden (NJ)	6 ft 3 in (1.91 m)	175 lb (79 kg)	Nov 14, 2022
D. J. Wagner; PG	Recruit ratings: Rivals: 247Sports: ESPN: (96)				
Overall recruit ranking:
Note: In many cases, Scout, Rivals, 247Sports, On3, and ESPN may conflict in their listings of height and weight.; In these cases, the average was taken. ESPN grades are on a 100-point scale.; Sources: "Kentucky 2023 Basketball Commitments". Rivals.; "2023 Kentucky Basketball Commits". ESPN.; "2023 Team Ranking". Rivals.; "Kentucky 2023 Basketball Commits". 247Sports.

=== Incoming transfers ===
Name	Number	Pos.	Height	Weight	Year	Hometown	Previous School	Years Eligible (Note: Due to a special NCAA ruling, the 2020–21 season does not count against the eligibility of players in all NCAA winter sports, including basketball.)	Date Eligible
Antonio Reeves	12	SG	6'6"	185	Senior	Chicago, IL	Illinois State	2	October 1, 2022

== Roster ==
2022–23 Kentucky Wildcats men's basketball team
Players
Coaches

Pos.	#	Name	Height	Weight	Year	Previous school	Hometown
F	0	Jacob Toppin	6 ft 9 in (2.06 m)	205 lb (93 kg)	Sr	Rhode Island	Brooklyn, NY
G	1	CJ Fredrick	6 ft 3 in (1.91 m)	185 lb (84 kg)	RS Sr	Iowa	Cincinnati, OH
G	2	Sahvir Wheeler	5 ft 9 in (1.75 m)	180 lb (82 kg)	Sr	Georgia	Houston, TX
G	3	Adou Thiero	6 ft 6 in (1.98 m)	200 lb (91 kg)	Fr	Quaker Valley	Leetsdale, PA
F	4	Daimion Collins	6 ft 9 in (2.06 m)	210 lb (95 kg)	So	Atlanta	Atlanta, TX
G	12	Antonio Reeves	6 ft 5 in (1.96 m)	205 lb (93 kg)	Sr	Illinois State	Chicago, IL
G	13	Grant Darbyshire (W)	6 ft 2 in (1.88 m)	190 lb (86 kg)	Fr	Sycamore	Cincinnati, OH
F	14	Brennan Canada	6 ft 6 in (1.98 m)	205 lb (93 kg)	Sr	George Rogers Clark	Mount Sterling, KY
G	21	Walker Horn (W)	6 ft 3 in (1.91 m)	200 lb (91 kg)	Fr	Westlake	Austin, TX
G	22	Cason Wallace	6 ft 4 in (1.93 m)	193 lb (88 kg)	Fr	Richardson	Dallas, TX
F	24	Chris Livingston	6 ft 6 in (1.98 m)	220 lb (100 kg)	Fr	Oak Hill	Akron, OH
G	25	Kareem Watkins (W)	5 ft 8 in (1.73 m)	175 lb (79 kg)	Jr	Kingsway Regional	Camden, NJ
C	33	Ugonna Onyenso	6 ft 11 in (2.11 m)	225 lb (102 kg)	Fr	Putnam Science Academy	Owerri, Imo State, Nigeria
F	34	Oscar Tshiebwe	6 ft 9 in (2.06 m)	260 lb (118 kg)	Sr	West Virginia	Lubumbashi, DR Congo
F	55	Lance Ware	6 ft 9 in (2.06 m)	235 lb (107 kg)	Jr	Camden	Camden, NJ

Head coach

- John Calipari (Clarion)

Assistant coach(es)

- Orlando Antigua (Pittsburgh)
- Ron Coleman (Lamar)
- K. T. Turner (Oklahoma City)

Legend

- (C) Team captain
- (S) Suspended
- (I) Ineligible
- (W) Walk-on
- Injured
- Current redshirt

Roster

== Schedule and results ==
Date time, TV	Rank^{#}	Opponent^{#}	Result	Record	High points	High rebounds	High assists	Site (attendance) city, state
Big Blue Bahamas exhibition trip
August 10, 2022*; 7:00 p.m., SECN		vs. Dominican Republic National Select Team	W 108–56		17 – Tshiebwe	8 – Livingston	5 – Collins	Baha Mar Convention Center (1,200); Nassau, BAH
August 11, 2022*; 7:00 p.m., SECN		vs. Tec De Monterrey	W 102–40		14 – Tie	14 – Tshiebwe	10 – Wheeler	Baha Mar Convention Center (1,200); Nassau, BAH
August 13, 2022*; 6:00 p.m., SECN		vs. Carleton University	W 118–56		27 – Toppin	13 – Tshiebwe	6 – Tie	Baha Mar Convention Center (1,200); Nassau, BAH
August 14, 2022*; 12:00 p.m., SECN		vs. The Bahamas National Select Team	W 98–74		22 – Reeves	12 – Tshiebwe	5 – Wallace	Baha Mar Convention Center (1,200); Nassau, BAH
Exhibition
October 30, 2022*; 7:00 p.m., SECN	No. 4	Missouri Western	W 56–38		15 – Fredrick	7 – Wallace	2 – Toppin	Rupp Arena (17,735); Lexington, KY
November 3, 2022*; 7:00 p.m., SECN+/ESPN+	No. 4	Kentucky State	W 111–53		23 – Reeves	11 – Onyenso	6 – Fredrick	Rupp Arena (18,413); Lexington, KY
Regular season
November 7, 2022*; 6:30 p.m., SECN	No. 4	Howard	W 95–63	1–0	22 – Reeves	11 – Toppin	9 – Wallace	Rupp Arena (18,750); Lexington, KY
November 11, 2022*; 7:00 p.m., SECN	No. 4	Duquesne; Tribute Classic	W 77–52	2–0	18 – Reeves	10 – Onyenso	11 – Wheeler	Rupp Arena (20,014); Lexington, KY
November 15, 2022*; 7:00 p.m., ESPN	No. 4	vs. Michigan State; Champions Classic	L 77–86 ^{2OT}	2–1	22 – Tshiebwe	18 – Tshiebwe	8 – Wheeler	Gainbridge Fieldhouse (17,923); Indianapolis, IN
November 17, 2022*; 7:00 p.m., SECN	No. 4	South Carolina State; Tribute Classic	W 106–63	3–1	17 – Fredrick	9 – Toppin	10 – Wheeler	Rupp Arena (18,885); Lexington, KY
November 20, 2022*; 7:30 p.m., ESPN	No. 4	vs. No. 2 Gonzaga	L 72–88	3–2	20 – Tshiebwe	15 – Tshiebwe	4 – Wheeler	Spokane Arena (12,333); Spokane, WA
November 23, 2022*; 4:00 p.m., SECN+/ESPN+	No. 15	North Florida; Tribute Classic	W 96–56	4–2	20 – Tie	15 – Tshiebwe	6 – Wallace	Rupp Arena (19,763); Lexington, KY
November 29, 2022*; 7:00 p.m., SECN+/ESPN+	No. 19	Bellarmine	W 60–41	5–2	18 – Reeves	12 – Tshiebwe	6 – Wheeler	Rupp Arena (19,092); Lexington, KY
December 4, 2022*; 1:00 p.m., ABC	No. 19	vs. Michigan; Basketball Hall of Fame London Showcase	W 73–69	6–2	14 – Tie	14 – Tshiebwe	7 – Wheeler	The O2 Arena (8,242); London, England
December 10, 2022*; 1:00 p.m., SECN	No. 16	Yale	W 69–59	7–2	28 – Tshiebwe	12 – Tshiebwe	4 – Toppin	Rupp Arena (20,264); Lexington, KY
December 17, 2022*; 5:15 p.m., CBS	No. 13	vs. No. 16 UCLA; CBS Sports Classic	L 53–63	7–3	14 – Livingston	16 – Tshiebwe	6 – Wheeler	Madison Square Garden (20,261); New York City, NY
December 21, 2022*; 7:00 p.m., SECN	No. 19	Florida A&M	W 88–68	8–3	27 – Wallace	8 – Tshiebwe	9 – Wallace	Rupp Arena (20,226); Lexington, KY
December 28, 2022; 7:00 p.m., SECN	No. 19	at Missouri	L 75–89	8–4 (0–1)	23 – Tshiebwe	19 – Tshiebwe	8 – Wheeler	Mizzou Arena (15,061); Columbia, MO
December 31, 2022*; 12:00 p.m., CBS	No. 19	Louisville; Rivalry	W 86–63	9–4	24 – Tie	14 – Tshiebwe	9 – Wheeler	Rupp Arena (20,934); Lexington, KY
January 3, 2023; 8:00 p.m., ESPN		LSU	W 74–71	10–4 (1–1)	21 – Toppin	16 – Tshiebwe	9 – Wheeler	Rupp Arena (19,610); Lexington, KY
January 7, 2023; 1:00 p.m., ESPN		at No. 7 Alabama	L 52–78	10–5 (1–2)	20 – Reeves	6 – Tie	3 – Tie	Coleman Coliseum (13,747); Tuscaloosa, AL
January 10, 2023; 7:00 p.m., ESPN2		South Carolina	L 68–71	10–6 (1–3)	19 – Tshiebwe	12 – Tshiebwe	3 – Wheeler	Rupp Arena (19,393); Lexington, KY
January 14, 2023; 12:00 p.m., ESPN		at No. 5 Tennessee; Rivalry	W 63–56	11–6 (2–3)	18 – Reeves	13 – Tshiebwe	6 – Wallace	Thompson–Boling Arena (21,678); Knoxville, TN
January 17, 2023; 9:00 p.m., ESPN		Georgia	W 85–71	12–6 (3–3)	37 – Tshiebwe	24 – Tshiebwe	4 – Toppin	Rupp Arena (19,171); Lexington, KY
January 21, 2023; 2:00 p.m., ESPN		Texas A&M	W 76–67	13–6 (4–3)	23 – Reeves	17 – Tshiebwe	4 – Wallace	Rupp Arena (20,017); Lexington, KY
January 24, 2023; 9:00 p.m., SECN		at Vanderbilt	W 69–53	14–6 (5–3)	16 – Reeves	13 – Tshiebwe	5 – Tie	Memorial Gymnasium (10,238); Nashville, TN
January 28, 2023*; 8:00 p.m., ESPN		No. 9 Kansas; Big 12/SEC Challenge	L 68–77	14–7	18 – Tshiebwe	9 – Tshiebwe	5 – Wallace	Rupp Arena (20,418); Lexington, KY
January 31, 2023; 9:00 p.m., ESPN		at Ole Miss	W 75–66	15–7 (6–3)	27 – Reeves	11 – Tshiebwe	9 – Wheeler	SJB Pavilion; Oxford, MS
February 4, 2023; 8:30 p.m., ESPN		Florida; Rivalry	W 72–67	16–7 (7–3)	20 – Wallace	15 – Tshiebwe	3 – Tie	Rupp Arena (20,315); Lexington, KY
February 7, 2023; 9:00 p.m., ESPN		Arkansas	L 73–88	16–8 (7–4)	24 – Wallace	8 – Toppin	5 – Wallace	Rupp Arena (19,855); Lexington, KY
February 11, 2023; 12:00 p.m., ESPN		at Georgia	L 68–75	16–9 (7–5)	20 – Tie	14 – Tshiebwe	6 – Wallace	Stegeman Coliseum (10,376); Athens, GA
February 15, 2023; 8:30 p.m., SECN		at Mississippi State	W 71–68	17–9 (8–5)	18 – Tshiebwe	11 – Tshiebwe	11 – Wallace	Humphrey Coliseum (9,297); Starkville, MS
February 18, 2023; 1:00 p.m., CBS		No. 10 Tennessee; Rivalry	W 66–54	18–9 (9–5)	16 – Tie	10 – Livingston	6 – Wallace	Rupp Arena (20,323); Lexington, KY
February 22, 2023; 7:00 p.m., ESPN		at Florida; Rivalry	W 82–74	19–9 (10–5)	25 – Tshiebwe	15 – Livingston	6 – Wallace	O'Connell Center (9,540); Gainesville, FL
February 25, 2023; 4:00 p.m., CBS		Auburn	W 86–54	20–9 (11–5)	22 – Tshiebwe	17 – Tshiebwe	9 – Wallace	Rupp Arena (20,353); Lexington, KY
March 1, 2023; 7:00 p.m., SECN	No. 23	Vanderbilt	L 66–68	20–10 (11–6)	21 – Tshiebwe	20 – Tshiebwe	2 – Tie	Rupp Arena (20,337); Lexington, KY
March 4, 2023; 2:00 p.m., CBS	No. 23	at Arkansas	W 88–79	21–10 (12–6)	37 – Reeves	13 – Tshiebwe	4 – Fredrick	Bud Walton Arena (19,200); Fayetteville, AR
SEC Tournament
March 10, 2023*; 9:00 p.m., SECN	(3) No. 23	vs. (6) Vanderbilt; Quarterfinals	L 73–80	21–11	22 – Reeves	15 – Tshiebwe	5 – Wallace	Bridgestone Arena (17,989); Nashville, TN
NCAA tournament
March 17, 2023*; 7:10 pm, CBS	(6 E)	vs. (11 E) Providence; First Round	W 61–53	22–11	22 – Reeves	25 – Tshiebwe	5 – Wallace	Greensboro Coliseum; Greensboro, NC
March 19, 2023*; 2:40 p.m., CBS	(6 E)	vs. (3 E) No. 15 Kansas State; Second Round	L 69–75	22–12	25 – Tshiebwe	18 – Tshiebwe	4 – Wallace	Greensboro Coliseum (16,517); Greensboro, NC
*Non-conference game. ^{#}Rankings from AP Poll. (#) Tournament seedings in parentheses. E=East. All times are in Eastern Time.
