= 2021–22 Southeastern Conference men's basketball season =

- League: NCAA Division I
- Sport: Basketball
- Teams: 14
- TV partner(s): CBS, ESPN, SEC Network

Regular season

Tournament
- Venue: Amalie Arena, Tampa, Florida
- Champions: Tennessee
- Runners-up: Texas A&M
- Finals MVP: Kennedy Chandler (Tennessee)

Basketball seasons
- ← 2020–21 2022–23 →

2021–22 Southeastern Conference men's basketball standings
| | Conf. | | | | Overall |
| Team | W | | L | PCT | W | | L | PCT |
|---|---|---|---|---|---|---|---|---|
| No. 14 Auburn | 15 | – | 3 | .833 | 28 | – | 6 | .824 |
| No. 16 Kentucky | 14 | – | 4 | .778 | 26 | – | 8 | .765 |
| No. 15 Tennessee † | 14 | – | 4 | .778 | 27 | – | 8 | .771 |
| No. 8 Arkansas | 13 | – | 5 | .722 | 28 | – | 9 | .757 |
| LSU | 9 | – | 9 | .500 | 22 | – | 12 | .647 |
| Alabama | 9 | – | 9 | .500 | 19 | – | 14 | .576 |
| South Carolina | 9 | – | 9 | .500 | 18 | – | 13 | .581 |
| Texas A&M | 9 | – | 9 | .500 | 27 | – | 13 | .675 |
| Florida | 9 | – | 9 | .500 | 20 | – | 14 | .588 |
| Mississippi State | 8 | – | 10 | .444 | 18 | – | 16 | .529 |
| Vanderbilt | 7 | – | 11 | .389 | 19 | – | 17 | .528 |
| Missouri | 5 | – | 13 | .278 | 12 | – | 21 | .364 |
| Ole Miss | 4 | – | 14 | .222 | 13 | – | 19 | .406 |
| Georgia | 1 | – | 17 | .056 | 6 | – | 26 | .188 |
† 2022 SEC tournament winner Rankings from AP poll

The 2021–22 Southeastern Conference men's basketball season began with practices in October 2021, followed by the start of the 2021–22 NCAA Division I men's basketball season on November 9. Conference play started in late December and will end in March, after which 14 member teams will participate in the 2022 SEC men's basketball tournament at Amalie Arena in Tampa, Florida. The tournament champion is guaranteed a selection to the 2022 NCAA tournament.

== Offseason ==
The season was initially slated to begin on November 10, 2020, but was postponed due to the COVID-19 pandemic, which prematurely ended the previous season and continues to affect the current one.

== Preseason ==
=== Recruiting classes ===
Rankings
| Team | ESPN | Rivals | On3 Recruits | Scout/247 Sports | Signees |
| Alabama | | | | | |
| Arkansas | — | | - | | |
| Auburn | | | | | |
| Florida | | | | | |
| Georgia | | | | | |
| LSU | | | | | |
| Kentucky | | | | | |
| Missouri | | | | | |
| Mississippi State | | | | | |
| Ole Miss | | | | | |
| South Carolina | | | | | |
| Tennessee | | | | | |
| Texas A&M | | | | | |
| Vanderbilt | | | | | |

=== Preseason watchlists ===
Below is a table of notable preseason watch lists.

| Wooden | Naismith | Robertson | Cousy | West | Erving | Malone | Abdul-Jabbar | Olson |

=== Preseason All-American teams ===
| ESPN | CBS | USA | AP | Blue; Ribbon | Athlon; Sports | NBC; Sports | Street & Smith's | Sporting News | Sports; Illustrated |

=== Preseason polls ===
| | AP | Athlon Sports | Blue Ribbon | CBS Sports | Coaches | ESPN | KenPom | Lindy's; Sports | Sports; Illustrated | Sporting; News |
| Alabama | – | – | – | | – | – | | – | | – |
| Arkansas | – | – | – | | – | – | | – | | – – |
| Auburn | – | – | – | | – | – | | – | | – |
| Florida | – | – | – | | – | – | | – | | – |
| Georgia | – | – | – | | – | – | | – | | – |
| Kentucky | – | – | – | | – | – | | – | | – |
| LSU | – | – | – | | – | – | | – | | |
| Missouri | – | – | – | | – | – | | – | | |
| Mississippi State | – | – | – | | – | – | | – | | – – |
| Ole Miss | – | – | – | | – | – | | – | | – |
| South Carolina | – | – | – | | – | – | | – | | – |
| Tennessee | – | – | – | | – | – | | – | | – |
| Texas A&M | – | – | – | | – | – | | – | | – |
| Vanderbilt | – | – | – | | – | – | | – | | – |

=== SEC Media Day selections ===
Media poll
| 1 | Kentucky |
| 2 | Alabama |
| 3 | Arkansas |
| 4 | Tennessee |
| 5 | Auburn |
| 6 | LSU |
| 7 | Florida |
| 8 | Mississippi State |
| 9 | Ole Miss |
| 10 | Missouri |
| 11 | South Carolina |
| 12 | Texas A&M |
| 13 | Vanderbilt |
| 14 | Georgia |

=== Preseason All-SEC teams ===
| Media First Team | Media Second Team |
|---|---|
| Scotty Pippen Jr., Vanderbilt | Davonte Davis, Arkansas |
| Jaden Shackelford, Alabama | Jabari Smith, Auburn |
| Jahvon Quinerly, Alabama | Keion Brooks Jr., Kentucky |
| Colin Castleton, Florida | Kellan Grady, Kentucky |
| Sahvir Wheeler, Kentucky | Oscar Tshiebwe, Kentucky |
| Iverson Molinar, Mississippi State | Darius Days, LSU |

=== Midseason watchlists ===
Below is a table of notable midseason watch lists.

| John R. Wooden Award | Naismith | Cousy | West | Erving | Malone | Abdul-Jabbar |

=== Final watchlists ===
Below is a table of notable year end watch lists.

| John R. Wooden Award | Naismith Play of the Year | Naismith Defensive Player of the Year | Cousy | West | Erving | Malone | Abdul-Jabbar |

== Regular season ==
=== Early season tournaments ===
| Team | Tournament | Finish |
|---|---|---|
| Alabama | | - |
| Arkansas | | - |
| Auburn | | - |
| Florida | | - |
| Georgia | | - |
| Kentucky | | - |
| LSU | | - |
| Mississippi State | | - |
| Missouri | | - |
| Ole Miss | | - |
| South Carolina | | |
| Tennessee | | - |
| Texas A&M | | - |
| Vanderbilt | | – |

=== Records against other conferences ===
2021–22 records against non-conference foes:

Regular season

| Power Conferences & Gonzaga | Record |
|---|---|
| ACC | 11–11 |
| Big East | 2–5 |
| Big Ten | 3–6 |
| Big 12 | 7–10 |
| Pac-12 | 7–0 |
| Gonzaga | 1–0 |
| Power Conferences Total | 31–32 |
| Other NCAA Division I Conferences | Record |
| American | 8–5 |
| America East | 3–0 |
| A-10 | 5–2 |
| ASUN | 12–1 |
| Big Sky | 1–0 |
| Big South | 9–1 |
| Big West | 1–0 |
| CAA | 3–1 |
| C-USA | 8–1 |
| Horizon | 4–0 |
| Ivy League | 2–1 |
| MAAC | 3–2 |
| MAC | 5–0 |
| MEAC | 1–0 |
| MVC | 3–1 |
| Mountain West | 0–2 |
| NEC | 1–0 |
| OVC | 9–0 |
| Patriot League | 0–0 |
| SoCon | 6–3 |
| Southland | 7–0 |
| SWAC | 5–1 |
| The Summit | 1–1 |
| Sun Belt | 8–1 |
| WAC | 3–0 |
| WCC (except Gonzaga) | 2–0 |
| Other Division I Total | 110–23 |
| Division II Total | 3–0 |
| NCAA Division I Total | 141–56 |

Postseason

| Power Conferences & Gonzaga | Record |
|---|---|
| ACC | 1–4 |
| Big East | 0–3 |
| Big Ten | 0–1 |
| Big 12 | 0–1 |
| Pac-12 | 2–0 |
| Gonzaga | 1–0 |
| Power Conferences Total | 4–9 |
| Other NCAA Division I Conferences | Record |
| American | 0–0 |
| America East | 1–0 |
| A-10 | 1–0 |
| ASUN | 1–0 |
| Big Sky | 0–0 |
| Big South | 1–0 |
| Big West | 0–0 |
| CAA | 0–0 |
| C-USA | 0–0 |
| Horizon | 0–0 |
| Ivy League | 0–0 |
| MAAC | 1–1 |
| MAC | 0–0 |
| MEAC | 0–0 |
| MVC | 0–0 |
| Mountain West | 0–0 |
| NEC | 0–0 |
| OVC | 1–0 |
| Patriot League | 0–0 |
| SoCon | 0–0 |
| Southland | 0–0 |
| SWAC | 1–0 |
| The Summit | 0–0 |
| Sun Belt | 0–0 |
| WAC | 1–0 |
| WCC (except Gonzaga) | 0–0 |
| Other Division I Total | 8–1 |
| NCAA Division I Total | 12–10 |

=== Record against ranked non-conference opponents ===
This is a list of games against ranked opponents only (rankings from the AP Poll):

| Date | Visitor | Home | Site | Significance | Score | Conference record |
|---|---|---|---|---|---|---|
| Nov 9 | No. 10 Kentucky | No. 9 Duke | Madison Square Garden ● New York, NY | Champions Classic | 71–79 | 0–1 |
| Nov 20 | Villanova | Tennessee | Mohegan Sun Arena ● Uncasville, CT | Hall of Fame Tip Off | 53–71 | 0–2 |
| Nov 24 | UConn | Auburn | Imperial Arena ● Nassau, Bahamas | Battle 4 Atlantis | 109–115 | 0–3 |
| Dec 1 | Memphis | Georgia | Stegeman Coliseum ● Athens, GA | ― | 82–79 | 1–3 |
| Dec 4 | Memphis | Ole Miss | The Sandy and John Black Pavilion at Ole Miss ● Oxford, MS | ― | 67–63 | 2–3 |
| Dec 4 | Tennessee | Colorado | CU Events Center ● Boulder, CO | ― | 69–54 | 3–3 |
| Dec 4 | Alabama | Gonzaga | Climate Pledge Arena ● Seattle, WA | — | 91-82 | 4–3 |
| Dec 7 | Texas Tech | Tennessee | Madison Square Garden ● New York, NY | ― | 52–57 | 4–4 |
| Dec 11 | Nebraska | Auburn | State Farm Arena ● Atlanta, GA | ― | 99–68 | 5–4 |
| Dec 11 | Missouri | Kansas | Allen Fieldhouse ● Lawrence, KS | Border War | 65–102 | 5–5 |
| Dec 11 | Kentucky | Notre Dame | Purcell Pavilion ● South Bend, IN | ― | 62–66 | 5–6 |
| Dec 11 | UConn | Alabama | Coleman Coliseum ● Tuscaloosa, AL | ― | 83–82 | 6–6 |
| Dec 12 | Florida State | South Carolina | Rock Hill Sports & Event Center ● Rock Hill, SC | — | 66–65 | 7–6 |
| Dec 12 | Florida | Maryland | Barclays Center ● Brooklyn, NY | ― | 68–70 | 7–7 |
| Dec 14 | Alabama | Memphis | FedExForum ● Memphis, TN | ― | 78–92 | 7–8 |
| Dec 18 | Tennessee | Memphis | Bridgestone Arena ● Nashville, TN | ― | CANCELED | ― |
| Dec 18 | Ohio State | Kentucky | T-Mobile Arena ● Las Vegas, NV | ― | CANCELLED | ― |
| Dec 22 | Louisville | Kentucky | Rupp Arena ● Lexington, KY | ― | POSTPONED | ― |
| Dec 22 | Arizona | Tennessee | Thompson-Boling Arena ● Knoxville, TN | ― | 77–73 | 8–8 |
| Dec 22 | Illinois | Missouri | Enterprise Center ● St. Louis, MO | ― | 63-88 | 8–9 |

Team rankings are reflective of AP poll when the game was played, not current or final ranking

† denotes game was played on neutral site

== Conference matrix ==
This table summarizes the head-to-head results between teams in conference play.

| | Alabama | Arkansas | Auburn | Florida | Georgia | Kentucky | LSU | Mississippi State | Missouri | Ole Miss | South Carolina | Tennessee | Texas A&M | Vanderbilt |
|---|---|---|---|---|---|---|---|---|---|---|---|---|---|---|
| vs. Alabama | – | 0–1 | 2–0 | 0–0 | 1–0 | 0–0 | 0–0 | 0–0 | 0–0 | 0–0 | 0–0 | 0–0 | 0–0 | 0–0 |
| vs. Arkansas | 1–0 | – | 0–1 | 0–0 | 0–1 | 0–0 | 0–0 | 0–0 | 0–0 | 0–0 | 0–0 | 0–0 | 0–0 | 0–0 |
| vs. Auburn | 0–2 | 1–0 | – | 0–0 | 0–2 | 0–0 | 0–0 | 0–0 | 0–0 | 0–0 | 0–1 | 0–0 | 0–0 | 0–0 |
| vs. Florida | 1–0 | 1–0 | 1–1 | – | 0–1 | 0–0 | 0–0 | 0–0 | 0–0 | 0–0 | 0–0 | 0–0 | 0–0 | 0–0 |
| vs. Georgia | 0–1 | 1–0 | 2–0 | 0–0 | – | 0–0 | 0–0 | 0–0 | 0–0 | 0–0 | 0–0 | 0–0 | 0–0 | 0–0 |
| vs. Kentucky | 0–2 | 1–0 | 1–0 | 0–0 | 0–1 | – | 0–0 | 0–0 | 0–0 | 0–0 | 0–0 | 0–0 | 0–0 | 0–0 |
| vs. LSU | 1–0 | 2–0 | 1–0 | 0–0 | 0–1 | 0–0 | – | 0–0 | 0–0 | 0–0 | 0–0 | 0–0 | 0–0 | 0–0 |
| vs. Miss. State | 1–1 | 1–1 | 1–0 | 0–0 | 0–1 | 0–0 | 0–0 | – | 0–0 | 0–0 | 0–0 | 0–0 | 0–0 | 0–0 |
| vs. Missouri | 1–1 | 2–0 | 1–0 | 0–0 | 0–1 | 0–0 | 0–0 | 0–0 | – | 0–0 | 0–0 | 0–0 | 0–0 | 0–0 |
| vs. Ole Miss | 1–0 | 1–0 | 2–0 | 0–0 | 0–1 | 0–0 | 0–0 | 0–0 | 0–0 | – | 0–0 | 0–0 | 0–0 | 0–0 |
| vs. South Carolina | 1–0 | 1–0 | 1–0 | 0–0 | 0–2 | 0–0 | 0–0 | 0–0 | 0–0 | 0–0 | – | 0–0 | 0–0 | 0–0 |
| vs. Tennessee | 1–0 | 1–0 | 0–1 | 0–0 | 0–1 | 0–0 | 0–0 | 0–0 | 0–0 | 0–0 | 0–0 | – | 0–0 | 0–0 |
| vs. Texas A&M | 0–1 | 0-1 | 1–0 | 0–0 | 0–2 | 0–0 | 0–0 | 0–0 | 0–0 | 0–0 | 0–0 | 0–0 | – | 0–0 |
| vs. Vanderbilt | 1–0 | 1–1 | 1–0 | 0–0 | 0–2 | 0–0 | 0–0 | 0–0 | 0–0 | 0–0 | 0–0 | 0–0 | 0–0 | – |
| Total | 9-8 | 13–4 | 14–3 | 9–8 | 1–16 | 13–4 | 8–9 | 8–9 | 4–13 | 4–13 | 9–8 | 13–4 | 8–9 | 6–11 |

=== Points scored ===
| Team | For | Against | Difference |
|---|---|---|---|
| Alabama | ― | ― | ― |
| Arkansas | ― | ― | ― |
| Auburn | ― | ― | ― |
| Florida | ― | ― | ― |
| Georgia | ― | ― | ― |
| Kentucky | ― | ― | ― |
| LSU | ― | ― | ― |
| Missouri | ― | ― | ― |
| Mississippi State | ― | ― | ― |
| Ole Miss | ― | ― | ― |
| South Carolina | ― | ― | ― |
| Tennessee | ― | ― | ― |
| Texas A&M | ― | ― | ― |
| Vanderbilt | ― | ― | ― |

Through March 18, 2021

=== Rankings ===
| | Improvement in ranking |
| | Drop in ranking |
| RV | Received votes but were not ranked in Top 25 |
| NV | No votes received |

| | | Pre | Wk 2 | Wk 3 | Wk 4 | Wk 5 | Wk 6 | Wk 7 | Wk 8 | Wk 9 | Wk 10 | Wk 11 | Wk 12 | Wk 13 | Wk 14 | Wk 15 | Wk 16 | Wk 17 | Wk 18 | Wk 19 | Final |
|---|---|---|---|---|---|---|---|---|---|---|---|---|---|---|---|---|---|---|---|---|---|
| Alabama | AP | RV | | | | | | | | | | | | | | | | | | | |
| Alabama | C | RV | | | | | | | | | | | | | | | | | | | |
| Arkansas | AP | NV | | | | | | | | | | | | | | | | | | | |
| Arkansas | C | NV | | | | | | | | | | | | | | | | | | | |
| Auburn | AP | NV | | | | | | | | | | | | | | | | | | | |
| Auburn | C | NV | | | | | | | | | | | | | | | | | | | |
| Florida | AP | RV | | | | | | | | | | | | | | | | | | | |
| Florida | C | RV | | | | | | | | | | | | | | | | | | | |
| Georgia | AP | RV | | | | | | | | | | | | | | | | | | | |
| Georgia | C | RV | | | | | | | | | | | | | | | | | | | |
| Kentucky | AP | RV | | | | | | | | | | | | | | | | | | | |
| Kentucky | C | RV | | | | | | | | | | | | | | | | | | | |
| LSU | AP | NV | | | | | | | | | | | | | | | | | | | |
| LSU | C | NV | | | | | | | | | | | | | | | | | | | |
| Missouri | AP | 13 | | | | | | | | | | | | | | | | | | | |
| Missouri | C | 12 | | | | | | | | | | | | | | | | | | | |
| Mississippi State | AP | NV | | | | | | | | | | | | | | | | | | | |
| Mississippi State | C | NV | | | | | | | | | | | | | | | | | | | |
| Ole Miss | AP | NV | | | | | | | | | | | | | | | | | | | |
| Ole Miss | C | NV | | | | | | | | | | | | | | | | | | | |
| South Carolina | AP | 2 | | | | | | | | | | | | | | | | | | | |
| South Carolina | C | 2 | | | | | | | | | | | | | | | | | | | |
| Tennessee | AP | RV | | | | | | | | | | | | | | | | | | | |
| Tennessee | C | RV | | | | | | | | | | | | | | | | | | | |
| Texas A&M | AP | NV | | | | | | | | | | | | | | | | | | | |
| Texas A&M | C | NV | | | | | | | | | | | | | | | | | | | |
| Vanderbilt | AP | NV | | | | | | | | | | | | | | | | | | | |
| Vanderbilt | C | NV | | | | | | | | | | | | | | | | | | | |

== Head coaches ==
Note: Stats shown are before the beginning of the season. Overall and SEC records are from time at current school.

| Team | Head coach | Previous job | Season at school | Overall record | SEC record | NCAA tournaments | NCAA Final Fours | NCAA Championships |
|---|---|---|---|---|---|---|---|---|
| Alabama | Nate Oats | Buffalo | 2 | 16–15 (.516) | 8–10 (.444) | 0 | 0 | 0 |
| Arkansas | Eric Musselman | Nevada | 2 | 20–12 (.625) | 7–11 (.389) | 0 | 0 | 0 |
| Auburn | Bruce Pearl | Tennessee | 7 | 125–78 (.616) | 52–56 (.481) | 2 | 1 | 0 |
| Florida | Mike White | Louisiana Tech | 6 | 108–65 (.624) | 54–36 (.600) | 3 | 0 | 0 |
| Georgia | Tom Crean | Indiana | 3 | 27–37 (.422) | 7–29 (.194) | 0 | 0 | 0 |
| Kentucky | John Calipari | Memphis | 12 | 330–77 (.811) | 151–41 (.786) | 9 | 4 | 1 |
| LSU | Will Wade | VCU | 4 | 64–30 (.681) | 35–18 (.660) | 1 | 0 | 0 |
| Mississippi State | Ben Howland | UCLA | 6 | 98–67 (.594) | 43–47 (.478) | 1 | 0 | 0 |
| Missouri | Cuonzo Martin | California | 4 | 50–46 (.521) | 22–32 (.407) | 1 | 0 | 0 |
| Ole Miss | Kermit Davis | Middle Tennessee | 3 | 35–30 (.538) | 16–20 (.444) | 1 | 0 | 0 |
| South Carolina | Frank Martin | Kansas State | 9 | 147–119 (.553) | 66–78 (.458) | 1 | 1 | 0 |
| Tennessee | Rick Barnes | Texas | 6 | 105–64 (.621) | 51–39 (.567) | 2 | 0 | 0 |
| Texas A&M | Buzz Williams | Virginia Tech | 2 | 16–14 (.533) | 10–8 (.556) | 0 | 0 | 0 |
| Vanderbilt | Jerry Stackhouse | Memphis Grizzlies (asst.) | 2 | 11–21 (.344) | 3–15 (.167) | 0 | 0 | 0 |

== Postseason ==
=== SEC tournament ===
First round Wednesday, March 9 SEC Network
12 | Missouri | 72
13 | Ole Miss | 60
11 | Vanderbilt | 86
14 | Georgia | 51

Second round Thursday, March 10; SEC Network
8 | Texas A&M | 83^{OT}
9 | Florida | 80
5 | LSU | 76
12 | Missouri | 68
7 | South Carolina | 51
10 | Mississippi State | 73
6 | Alabama | 76
11 | Vanderbilt | 82

Quarterfinals; Friday, March 11; ESPN/SEC Network
1 | Auburn | 62
8 | Texas A&M | 67
4 | Arkansas | 79
5 | LSU | 67
2 | Tennessee | 72
10 | Mississippi State | 59
3 | Kentucky | 77
11 | Vanderbilt | 71

Semifinals; Saturday, March 12; ESPN
8 | Texas A&M | 82
4 | Arkansas | 64
2 | Tennessee | 69
3 | Kentucky | 62

Championship; Sunday, March 13; ESPN
8 | Texas A&M | 50
2 | Tennessee | 65

=== NCAA tournament ===
Teams from the conference were selected to participate:

| Seed | Region | School | First round | Second round | Sweet Sixteen | Elite Eight | Final Four | Championship |
|---|---|---|---|---|---|---|---|---|
| 2 | Midwest | Auburn | Defeated (15) Jacksonville State, 80–61 | Lost to (10) Miami (FL), 61–79 | DNP | | | |
| 2 | East | Kentucky | Lost to (15) Saint Peter's, 79–85 (OT) | DNP | | | | |
| 3 | South | Tennessee | Defeated (14) Longwood, 88–57 | Lost to (11) Michigan, 68–76 | DNP | | | |
| 4 | Arkansas | West | Defeated (13) Vermont, 75–71 | Defeated (12) New Mexico State, 53–48 | Defeated (1) Gonzaga, 74–68 | Lost to (2) Duke, 69–78 | DNP | |
| 6 | Alabama | West | Lost to (11) Notre Dame, 64–78 | DNP | | | | |
| 6 | LSU | Midwest | Lost to (11) Iowa State, 54–59 | DNP | | | | |
| | Bids | W-L (%): | 3–3 (.500) | 1–2 (.333) | 1–0 (1.000) | 0–1 (.000) | 0–0 (–) | TOTAL: 5–6 (.455) |

=== National Invitation tournament ===
Number from the conference were selected to participate:

| Seed | School | First round | Second round | Quarterfinals | Semifinals | Finals |
|---|---|---|---|---|---|---|
| 1 | Texas A&M | Defeated (8) Alcorn State, 74–62 | Defeated (5) Oregon, 75–60 | Defeated (2) Wake Forest, 67–52 | Defeated (4) Washington State, 67–52 | Lost to (2) Xavier, 72–73 |
| 3 | Florida | Defeated (6) Iona, 79–74 | Lost to (2) Xavier, 56–72 | DNP | | |
| 3 | Mississippi State | Lost to (6) Virginia, 57–60 | DNP | | | |
| 4 | Vanderbilt | Defeated (5) Belmont, 82–71 | Defeated (1) Dayton, 70–68 (OT) | Lost to (2) Xavier, 73–75 | DNP | |
| | W-L (%): | 3–1 (.750) | 2–1 (.667) | 1–1 (.500) | 1–0 (1.000) | TOTAL: 7–4 (.636) |

Index to colors and formatting
SEC member won
SEC member lost

== Honors and awards ==
=== Players of the Week ===
| Week | Player of the Week | School | Freshman of the Week | School | Ref. |
|---|---|---|---|---|---|
| Nov. 15 | Colin Castleton | Florida | Kennedy Chandler | Tennessee | |
| Nov. 22 | Darius Days | LSU | TyTy Washington | Kentucky | |
| Nov. 29 | Quenton Jackson | Texas A&M | Jabari Smith Jr. | Auburn | |
| Dec. 6 | Jaden Shackelford | Alabama | JD Davison | Alabama | |
| Dec. 13 | Tari Eason | LSU | Devin Carter | South Carolina | |
| Dec. 20 | Sahvir Wheeler | Kentucky | Wade Taylor IV | Texas A&M | |
| Dec. 27 | Oscar Tshiebwe; John Fulkerson | Kentucky; Tennessee | TyTy Washington (2) | Kentucky | |
| Jan. 3 | Walker Kessler | Auburn | Jabari Smith Jr. (2); TyTy Washington (3) | Auburn; Kentucky | |
| Jan. 10 | Kobe Brown | Missouri | TyTy Washington (4) | Kentucky | |
| Jan. 17 | Iverson Molinar | Mississippi State | Jabari Smith Jr. (3); TyTy Washington (5) | Auburn; Kentucky | |
| Jan. 24 | Jaylin Williams; Walker Kessler (2) | Arkansas; Auburn | Jabari Smith Jr. (4) | Auburn | |
| Jan. 31 | Keion Brooks Jr. | Kentucky | Daeshun Ruffin | Ole Miss | |
| Feb. 7 | Wendell Green Jr. | Auburn | Zakai Zeigler | Tennessee | |
| Feb. 14 | Walker Kessler (3); Oscar Tshiebwe (2) | Auburn; Kentucky | JD Davison (2) | Alabama | |
| Feb. 21 | Jaylin Williams (2); Scotty Pippen Jr. | Arkansas; Vanderbilt | Jabari Smith Jr. (5) | Auburn | |
| Feb. 28 | JD Notae | Arkansas | Kennedy Chandler (2) | Tennessee | |
| Mar. 7 | Quenton Jackson (2) | Texas A&M | Jabari Smith Jr. (6) | Auburn | |

==== Totals per School ====
| School | Total |
|---|---|
| Auburn | 10 |
| Kentucky | 9 |
| Tennessee | 4 |
| Alabama | 3 |
| Arkansas | 3 |
| Texas A&M | 3 |
| LSU | 2 |
| Florida | 1 |
| Mississippi State | 1 |
| Missouri | 1 |
| Ole Miss | 1 |
| South Carolina | 1 |
| Vanderbilt | 1 |
| Georgia | 0 |

=== All-SEC Awards ===
==== Coaches ====
2022 SEC Men's Basketball Individual Awards
| Award | Recipient(s) |
| Player of the Year | Oscar Tshiebwe, Kentucky |
| Coach of the Year | Bruce Pearl, Auburn |
| Defensive Player of the Year | Walker Kessler, Auburn |
| Freshman of the Year | Jabari Smith Jr., Auburn |
| Scholar-Athlete of the Year | Jordan Wright, Vanderbilt |
| Sixth Man Award | Tari Eason, LSU |

==== Players ====
2022 SEC Men's Basketball All-Conference Teams
| First Team | Second Team | All-Freshman Team | All-Defensive Team |
| JD Notae, Arkansas; Jaylin Williams, Arkansas; Walker Kessler, Auburn; Jabari Smith Jr., Auburn; Oscar Tshiebwe, Kentucky; Tari Eason, LSU; Iverson Molinar, Mississippi State; Santiago Vescovi, Tennessee; Scotty Pippen Jr., Vanderbilt | Jaden Shackelford, Alabama; Colin Castleton, Florida; TyTy Washington, Kentucky; Sahvir Wheeler, Kentucky; Darius Days, LSU; Kobe Brown, Missouri; Kennedy Chandler, Tennessee; Quenton Jackson, Texas A&M | Charles Bediako, Alabama; JD Davison, Alabama; Jabari Smith Jr., Auburn; TyTy Washington, Kentucky; Brandon Murray, LSU; Devin Carter, South Carolina; Kennedy Chandler, Tennessee; Zakai Zeigler, Tennessee | Keon Ellis, Alabama; Jaylin Williams, Arkansas; Walker Kessler, Auburn; Oscar Tshiebwe, Kentucky; Zakai Zeigler, Tennessee |
† - denotes unanimous selection

Honorable Mention

==== AP ====
2022 SEC Men's Basketball Individual Awards
| Award | Recipient(s) |
| Player of the Year | Oscar Tshiebwe |
| Coach of the Year | Bruce Pearl |
| Newcomer of the Year | Jabari Smith Jr. |

2022 SEC Men's Basketball All-Conference Teams
| First Team | Second Team |
| Scotty Pippen Jr., Vanderbilt; JD Notae, Arkansas; Walker Kessler, Auburn; Oscar Tshiebwe, Kentucky; Jabari Smith Jr., Auburn | Kennedy Chandler, Tennessee; Iverson Molinar, Mississippi State; Colin Castleton, Florida; Tari Eason, LSU; Jaylin Williams, Arkansas |
† - denotes unanimous selection

Honorable Mention

=== All-District ===
The United States Basketball Writers Association (USBWA) named the following from the Pac-12 to their All-District Teams:

District VIII

All-District Team

District IX

Player of the Year

All-District Team

== 2022 NBA draft ==
| PG | Point guard | SG | Shooting guard | SF | Small forward | PF | Power forward | C | Center |

| Player | Team | Round | Pick # | Position | School | Nationality |
|---|---|---|---|---|---|---|
| Jabari Smith Jr. | Houston Rockets | 1 | 3 | PF | Auburn | United States |
| Shaedon Sharpe | Portland Trail Blazers | 1 | 7 | SG | Kentucky | Canada |
| Tari Eason | Houston Rockets | 1 | 17 | PF | LSU | United States |
| Walker Kessler | Memphis Grizzlies | 1 | 22 | C | Auburn | United States |
| TyTy Washington Jr. | Memphis Grizzlies | 1 | 29 | PG | Kentucky | United States |
| Jaylin Williams | Oklahoma City Thunder | 2 | 34 | PF | Arkansas | United States |
| Kennedy Chandler | San Antonio Spurs | 2 | 38 | PG | Tennessee | United States |
| JD Davison | Boston Celtics | 2 | 53 | PG | Alabama | United States |

== Home game attendance ==
| Team | Stadium | Capacity | Game 1 | Game 2 | Game 3 | Game 4 | Game 5 | Game 6 | Game 7 | Game 8 | Game 9 | Game 10 | Game 11 | Game 12 | Game 13 | Game 14 | Game 15 | Game 16 | Game 17 | Game 18 | Total | Average | % of Capacity |
|---|---|---|---|---|---|---|---|---|---|---|---|---|---|---|---|---|---|---|---|---|---|---|---|
| Alabama | | | – | – | – | – | – | – | – | – | – | – | – | – | – | – | – | – | – | | – | – | – |
| Arkansas | | | – | – | – | – | – | – | – | – | – | – | – | – | – | – | – | – | | | – | – | – |
| Auburn | | | – | – | – | – | – | – | – | – | – | – | – | – | – | – | – | – | – | – | – | – | – |
| Florida | | | – | – | – | – | – | – | – | – | – | – | – | – | – | – | – | – | – | – | – | – | – |
| Georgia | | | – | – | – | – | – | – | – | – | – | – | – | – | – | – | – | – | – | | – | – | – |
| Kentucky | | | – | – | – | – | – | – | – | – | – | – | – | – | – | – | – | – | – | | – | – | – |
| LSU | | | – | – | – | – | – | – | – | – | – | – | – | – | – | – | – | | | | – | – | – |
| Missouri | | | – | – | – | – | – | – | – | – | – | – | – | – | – | – | – | – | – | | – | – | – |
| Mississippi State | | | – | – | – | – | – | – | – | – | – | – | – | – | – | – | – | – | | | – | – | – |
| Ole Miss | | | – | – | – | – | – | – | – | – | – | – | – | – | – | – | – | – | | | – | – | – |
| South Carolina | | | – | – | – | – | – | – | – | – | – | – | – | – | – | – | – | – | – | | – | – | – |
| Tennessee | | | – | – | – | – | – | – | – | – | – | – | – | – | – | – | – | – | – | – | – | – | – |
| Texas A&M | | | – | – | – | – | – | – | – | – | – | – | – | – | – | – | – | – | – | – | – | – | – |
| Vanderbilt | | | – | – | – | – | – | – | – | – | – | – | – | – | – | – | – | – | – | – | – | – | – |
| Total | | | | | | | | | | | | | | | | | | | | | – | – | – |

Bold – At or exceed capacity
†Season high
