= 2021–22 Kentucky Wildcats men's basketball team =

American college basketball season

2021–22 Kentucky Wildcats men's basketball

NCAA tournament, First Round
- Conference: Southeastern Conference

Ranking
- Coaches: No. 16
- AP: No. 7
- Record: 26–8 (14–4 SEC)
- Head coach: John Calipari (13th season)
- Assistant coaches: Orlando Antigua (1st, 6th overall season); Ron Coleman (1st season); Bruiser Flint (2nd season)
- Home arena: Rupp Arena (Capacity: 20,545)

2021–22 Southeastern Conference men's basketball standings
	Conf.				Overall
Team	W		L	PCT	W		L	PCT
No. 14 Auburn	15	–	3	.833	28	–	6	.824
No. 16 Kentucky	14	–	4	.778	26	–	8	.765
No. 15 Tennessee †	14	–	4	.778	27	–	8	.771
No. 8 Arkansas	13	–	5	.722	28	–	9	.757
LSU	9	–	9	.500	22	–	12	.647
Alabama	9	–	9	.500	19	–	14	.576
South Carolina	9	–	9	.500	18	–	13	.581
Texas A&M	9	–	9	.500	27	–	13	.675
Florida	9	–	9	.500	20	–	14	.588
Mississippi State	8	–	10	.444	18	–	16	.529
Vanderbilt	7	–	11	.389	19	–	17	.528
Missouri	5	–	13	.278	12	–	21	.364
Ole Miss	4	–	14	.222	13	–	19	.406
Georgia	1	–	17	.056	6	–	26	.188
† 2022 SEC tournament winner Rankings from AP poll

The 2021–22 Kentucky Wildcats men's basketball team represented the University of Kentucky in the 2021–22 NCAA Division I men's basketball season. The Wildcats, founding members of the Southeastern Conference, played their home games at Rupp Arena and were led by John Calipari in his 13th season as head coach. The Wildcats finished the season 26–8, 14–4 in SEC play to finish a tie for second place. As the No. 3 seed in the SEC tournament, they defeated Vanderbilt in the quarterfinals before losing to Tennessee in the semifinals. They received an at large bid to the NCAA tournament as the No. 2 seed in the East region. The Wildcats became just the 10th No. 2 seed to lose in the first round of the NCAA Tournament, losing to No. 15-seeded (and eventual regional runner-up) Saint Peter's 85–79 in overtime. It also marked the first time Kentucky had suffered a First Round exit under Calipari, and allowed eventual tournament champion Kansas to take the all-time record for most wins in Division I men's college basketball history.

== Previous season ==
In a season disrupted by the ongoing COVID-19 pandemic restrictions, the Wildcats finished the 2020–21 season a disappointing 9–16, 8–9 in SEC play to finish in eighth place. They lost in the second round of the SEC tournament to Mississippi State.

== Offseason ==
=== Coaching changes ===
==== Departures ====
Name	Position	Year at Kentucky	Alma mater (year)	Reason for departure
Tony Barbee	Associate head coach	7th	UMass (2004)	Head coach at Central Michigan
Joel Justus	Assistant Coach	5th	UNC Wilmington (2004)	Assistant at Arizona State

==== Additions to staff ====
Name	Position	Year at Kentucky	Alma mater (year)	Previous position
Orlando Antigua	Associate head coach	1st (current stint); 6th (overall)	Pittsburgh (1995)	Assistant at Illinois; previously a UK assistant from 2009 to 2014.
Ron "Chin" Coleman	Assistant Coach	1st	Lamar (1997)	Assistant at Illinois.
Brad Calipari	Graduate Assistant	1st	Kentucky (B.A., 2019); Detroit Mercy (M.A., 2021)	Player at Detroit Mercy; also played at Kentucky from 2017 to 2019. Son of UK head coach John Calipari.
Riley Welch	Graduate Assistant	1st	Kentucky (2021)	Player at Kentucky; also played at UC Irvine in 2018–19.

=== Player departures ===
Note that all players in the 2020–21 season, regardless of their classification, had the option to return to the program. Due to COVID-19 impacts, the NCAA declared that the 2020–21 season would not count against the athletic eligibility of any student-athlete in any of the organization's winter sports, including basketball. This led the NBA and its players union to agree that for the 2021 draft only, players who were seniors in 2020–21 had to declare their eligibility for the draft.

Name	Number	Pos.	Height	Weight	Year	Hometown	Reason left
Devin Askew	2	Guard	6'3"	198	Freshman	Sacramento, CA	Transferred to Texas
Brandon Boston Jr.	3	Guard	6'7"	185	Freshman	Norcross, GA	Declared for the 2021 NBA draft
Terrence Clarke	5	Guard	6'7"	194	Freshman	Boston, MA	Declared for the 2021 NBA draft, but died in a car accident prior to the draft.
Riley Welch	13	Guard	6'0"	185	Senior	Littleton, CO	Graduated and joined the uk coaching staff; walk-on
Cam'Ron Fletcher	21	Forward	6'6"	215	Freshman	St. Louis, MO	Transferred to Florida State
Isaiah Jackson	23	Forward	6'10"	206	Freshman	Pontiac, MI	Declared for the 2021 NBA draft
Olivier Sarr	30	Center	7'0"	237	Senior	Bordeaux, FRA	Graduated and declared for the 2021 NBA draft; undrafted

=== 2021 recruiting class ===
On October 26, 2020, Bryce Hopkins committed to UK over offers from Louisville and Wisconsin. Hopkins was the first commitment in the 2021 recruiting class and the No. 9 ranked power forward in the 2021 class by 247Sports. He was a consensus four-star player by the four main recruiting services and was ranked No. 38 overall by 247Sports.

On October 31, 2020, Daimion Collins committed to UK over offers from Alabama and Oklahoma. Collins was the second commitment in the 2021 recruiting class and the No. 2 ranked power forward in the 2021 class by 247Sports. He was a consensus five-star player by the four main recruiting services and was ranked No. 10 overall by 247Sports.

On May 12, 2021, TyTy Washington committed to UK over offers from Arizona, Baylor, Kansas, LSU and Oregon. Washington was the third commitment in the 2021 recruiting class and the No. 1 ranked point guard in the 2021 class by 247Sports. He was a consensus five-star player by the four main recruiting services and was ranked No. 11 overall by 247Sports.

College recruiting
Name	Hometown	School	Height	Weight	Commit date
Bryce Hopkins; PF	Oak Park, IL	Fenwick (IL)	6 ft 7 in (2.01 m)	220 lb (100 kg)	Oct 26, 2020
Bryce Hopkins; PF	Recruit ratings: Rivals: 247Sports: ESPN: (88)				
Daimion Collins; PF	Atlanta, TX	Atlanta (TX)	6 ft 9 in (2.06 m)	210 lb (95 kg)	Oct 31, 2020
Daimion Collins; PF	Recruit ratings: Rivals: 247Sports: ESPN: (92)				
TyTy Washington; PG	Phoenix, AZ	AZ Compass Prep (AZ)	6 ft 3 in (1.91 m)	185 lb (84 kg)	May 12, 2021
TyTy Washington; PG	Recruit ratings: Rivals: 247Sports: ESPN: (94)				
Overall recruit ranking: Rivals: 5th 247Sports: 6th ESPN: 5th
Note: In many cases, Scout, Rivals, 247Sports, On3, and ESPN may conflict in their listings of height and weight.; In these cases, the average was taken. ESPN grades are on a 100-point scale.; Sources: "Kentucky 2021 Basketball Commitments". Rivals.; "2021 Kentucky Basketball Commits". ESPN.; "2021 Team Ranking". Rivals.; "Kentucky 2021 Basketball Commits". 247Sports.

=== 2022 recruiting class ===
On November 10, 2021, four consensus five-star prospects signed with UK: Skyy Clark, Chris Livingston, Shaedon Sharpe, and Cason Wallace. Clark planned to enroll at UK in the spring 2022 semester, while the others planned to arrive in fall 2022. On March 6, 2022, Clark announced that he would not be attending Kentucky. Kentucky released Clark from his letter of intent, freeing Clark to attend a new school.

College recruiting
Name	Hometown	School	Height	Weight	Commit date
Chris Livingston; SF	Akron, OH	Oak Hill Academy (VA)	6 ft 7 in (2.01 m)	210 lb (95 kg)	Nov 10, 2021
Chris Livingston; SF	Recruit ratings: Rivals: 247Sports: ESPN: (91)				
Shaedon Sharpe; SG	London, ON	Dream City Christian (AZ)	6 ft 5 in (1.96 m)	195 lb (88 kg)	Nov 10, 2021
Shaedon Sharpe; SG	Recruit ratings: Rivals: 247Sports: ESPN: (95)				
Cason Wallace; SG / PG	Dallas, TX	Richardson (TX)	6 ft 4 in (1.93 m)	190 lb (86 kg)	Nov 10, 2021
Cason Wallace; SG / PG	Recruit ratings: Rivals: 247Sports: ESPN: (92)				
Overall recruit ranking: Rivals: 2nd 247Sports: 8th ESPN: 1st
Note: In many cases, Scout, Rivals, 247Sports, On3, and ESPN may conflict in their listings of height and weight.; In these cases, the average was taken. ESPN grades are on a 100-point scale.; Sources: "Kentucky 2022 Basketball Commitments". Rivals.; "2022 Kentucky Basketball Commits". ESPN.; "2022 Team Ranking". Rivals.; "Kentucky 2022 Basketball Commits". 247Sports.

=== 2023 recruiting class ===
On November 20, 2021, Reed Sheppard verbally committed to UK over multiple offers, with Louisville and Virginia among the most active in attempting to recruit him. The son of former UK basketball players Jeff Sheppard and the former Stacey Reed, he was the first commitment to the 2023 recruiting class. At the time of his commitment, he was the No. 3 ranked combo guard in the 2023 class by 247 Sports.

College recruiting
Name	Hometown	School	Height	Weight	Commit date
Reed Sheppard; CG	London, KY	North Laurel (KY)	6 ft 3 in (1.91 m)	175 lb (79 kg)	Nov 20, 2021
Reed Sheppard; CG	Recruit ratings: Rivals: 247Sports: ESPN: (86)				
Overall recruit ranking: Rivals: 21st 247Sports: 17th ESPN: 37th
Note: In many cases, Scout, Rivals, 247Sports, On3, and ESPN may conflict in their listings of height and weight.; In these cases, the average was taken. ESPN grades are on a 100-point scale.; Sources: "Kentucky 2023 Basketball Commitments". Rivals.; "2023 Kentucky Basketball Commits". ESPN.; "2023 Team Ranking". Rivals.; "Kentucky 2023 Basketball Commits". 247Sports.

=== Incoming transfers ===
Name	Number	Pos.	Height	Weight	Year	Hometown	Previous School	Years Eligible (Note: Due to a special NCAA ruling, the 2020–21 season does not count against the eligibility of players in all NCAA winter sports, including basketball.)	Date Eligible
CJ Fredrick	1	G	6'3"	190	RS Junior	Cincinnati, OH	Iowa	3	October 1, 2021
Sahvir Wheeler	2	G	5'9"	180	Junior	Houston, TX	Georgia	3	October 1, 2021
Kellan Grady	31	G	6'5"	205	Graduate Student	Boston, MA	Davidson	1	October 1, 2021
Oscar Tshiebwe	34	F	6'9"	255	Junior	Lubumbashi, DR Congo	West Virginia	3	October 1, 2021

== Roster ==
2021–22 Kentucky Wildcats men's basketball team
Players
Coaches

Pos.	#	Name	Height	Weight	Year	Previous school	Hometown
F	0	Jacob Toppin	6 ft 9 in (2.06 m)	200 lb (91 kg)	Jr	Rhode Island	Brooklyn, NY
G	1	CJ Fredrick	6 ft 3 in (1.91 m)	190 lb (86 kg)	RS Jr	Iowa	Cincinnati, OH
G	2	Sahvir Wheeler	5 ft 9 in (1.75 m)	180 lb (82 kg)	Jr	Georgia	Houston, TX
G	3	TyTy Washington	6 ft 3 in (1.91 m)	197 lb (89 kg)	Fr	AZ Compass Prep	Phoenix, AZ
F	4	Daimion Collins	6 ft 9 in (2.06 m)	202 lb (92 kg)	Fr	Atlanta	Atlanta, TX
G	10	Davion Mintz	6 ft 3 in (1.91 m)	195 lb (88 kg)	GS	Creighton	Charlotte, NC
G	11	Dontaie Allen	6 ft 6 in (1.98 m)	205 lb (93 kg)	RS So	Pendleton County	Falmouth, KY
F	12	Keion Brooks Jr.	6 ft 7 in (2.01 m)	210 lb (95 kg)	Jr	La Lumiere School	Fort Wayne, IN
F	14	Brennan Canada (W)	6 ft 6 in (1.98 m)	198 lb (90 kg)	Jr	George Rogers Clark	Mount Sterling, KY
G/F	20	Zan Payne (W)	6 ft 4 in (1.93 m)	215 lb (98 kg)	RS Jr	Lexington Catholic	Lexington, KY
G	21	Shaedon Sharpe (redshirt)	6 ft 6 in (1.98 m)	200 lb (91 kg)	Fr	Dream City Christian	London, ON
F	23	Bryce Hopkins	6 ft 6 in (1.98 m)	220 lb (100 kg)	Fr	Fenwick	Oak Park, IL
G	25	Kareem Watkins (W)	5 ft 8 in (1.73 m)	170 lb (77 kg)	So	Kingsway Regional	Camden, NJ
G	31	Kellan Grady	6 ft 5 in (1.96 m)	205 lb (93 kg)	GS	Davidson	Boston, MA
F	34	Oscar Tshiebwe	6 ft 9 in (2.06 m)	255 lb (116 kg)	Jr	West Virginia	Lubumbashi, DR Congo
F	55	Lance Ware	6 ft 9 in (2.06 m)	225 lb (102 kg)	So	Camden	Camden, NJ

Head coach

- John Calipari (Clarion)

Assistant coach(es)

- Orlando Antigua (Pittsburgh)
- Ron Coleman (Lamar)
- Jai Lucas (Texas)

Legend

- (C) Team captain
- (S) Suspended
- (I) Ineligible
- (W) Walk-on
- Injured
- Current redshirt

Roster
Last update: May 18, 2021

== Schedule and results ==
Date time, TV	Rank^{#}	Opponent^{#}	Result	Record	High points	High rebounds	High assists	Site (attendance) city, state
Exhibition
October 29, 2021*; 7:00 p.m., SECN	No. 10	Kentucky Wesleyan	W 95–72		18 – Tie	10 – Tshiebwe	6 – Tie	Rupp Arena (17,133); Lexington, KY
November 5, 2021*; 7:00 p.m., SECN	No. 10	Miles College	W 80–71		15 – Tie	12 – Tshiebwe	6 – Tie	Rupp Arena (17,814); Lexington, KY
Regular season
November 9, 2021*; 9:30 p.m., ESPN	No. 10	vs. No. 9 Duke; Champions Classic	L 71–79	0–1	17 – Tshiebwe	20 – Tshiebwe	10 – Wheeler	Madison Square Garden (18,132); New York, NY
November 12, 2021*; 7:00 p.m., SECN	No. 10	Robert Morris; Kentucky Classic	W 100–60	1–1	19 – Grady	20 – Tshiebwe	11 – Wheeler	Rupp Arena (18,454); Lexington, KY
November 16, 2021*; 7:00 p.m., SECN	No. 13	Mount St. Mary's; Kentucky Classic	W 80–55	2–1	24 – Tshiebwe	16 – Tshiebwe	8 – Wheeler	Rupp Arena (18,227); Lexington, KY
November 19, 2021*; 7:00 p.m., SECN	No. 13	Ohio; Kentucky Classic	W 77–59	3–1	22 – Brooks Jr.	11 – Washington Jr.	5 – Washington Jr.	Rupp Arena (19,045); Lexington, KY
November 22, 2021*; 7:00 p.m., ESPN+/SECN+	No. 10т	Albany	W 86–61	4–1	20 – Washington Jr.	14 – Tshiebwe	7 – Wheeler	Rupp Arena (18,201); Lexington, KY
November 26, 2021*; 7:00 p.m., SECN	No. 10т	North Florida	W 86–52	5–1	14 – Tie	16 – Tshiebwe	14 – Wheeler	Rupp Arena (19,350); Lexington, KY
November 29, 2021*; 7:00 p.m., ESPN+/SECN+	No. 9	Central Michigan	W 85–57	6–1	20 – Tshiebwe	16 – Tshiebwe	6 – Wheeler	Rupp Arena (18,080); Lexington, KY
December 7, 2021*; 7:00 p.m., SECN	No. 10	Southern	W 76–64	7–1	23 – Tshiebwe	11 – Tshiebwe	6 – Wheeler	Rupp Arena (18,947); Lexington, KY
December 11, 2021*; 5:15 p.m., ESPN	No. 10	at Notre Dame	L 62–66	7–2	25 – Tshiebwe	7 – Tie	5 – Washington Jr.	Edmund P. Joyce Center (8,283); South Bend, IN
December 18, 2021*; 5:30 p.m., CBS	No. 21	vs. North Carolina; CBS Sports Classic	W 98–69	8–2	26 – Wheeler	12 – Tshiebwe	8 – Wheeler	T-Mobile Arena (12,117); Paradise, NV
December 22, 2021*; 6:00 p.m., ESPN	No. 20	Western Kentucky	W 95–60	9–2	23 – Grady	28 – Tshiebwe	8 – Wheeler	Rupp Arena (20,221); Lexington, KY
December 29, 2021; 7:00 p.m., SECN	No. 18	Missouri	W 83–56	10–2 (1–0)	17 – Brooks Jr.	20 – Tshiebwe	9 – Wheeler	Rupp Arena (19,361); Lexington, KY
December 31, 2021*; 12:00 p.m., SECN	No. 18	High Point	W 92–48	11–2	23 – Grady	8 – Tie	9 – Washington Jr.	Rupp Arena (19,735); Lexington, KY
January 4, 2022; 7:00 p.m., ESPN	No. 16т	at No. 21 LSU	L 60–65	11–3 (1–1)	16 – Mintz	13 – Tshiebwe	4 – Washington Jr.	Pete Maravich Assembly Center (11,808); Baton Rouge, LA
January 8, 2022; 6:00 p.m., SECN	No. 16т	Georgia	W 92–77	12–3 (2–1)	29 – Tshiebwe	17 – Tshiebwe	17 – Washington Jr.	Rupp Arena (19,343); Lexington, KY
January 11, 2022; 7:00 p.m., ESPN	No. 18	at Vanderbilt	W 78–66	13–3 (3–1)	30 – Tshiebwe	12 – Tshiebwe	4 – Washington Jr.	Memorial Gymnasium (8,343); Nashville, TN
January 15, 2022; 1:00 p.m., ESPN	No. 18	No. 22 Tennessee; Rivalry	W 107–79	14–3 (4–1)	28 – Washington Jr.	12 – Tshiebwe	8 – Wheeler	Rupp Arena (20,278); Lexington, KY
January 19, 2022; 8:30 p.m., SECN	No. 12	at Texas A&M	W 64–58	15–3 (5–1)	12 – Wheeler	14 – Tshiebwe	4 – Wheeler	Reed Arena (14,036); College Station, TX
January 22, 2022; 1:00 p.m., CBS	No. 12	at No. 2 Auburn	L 71–80	15–4 (5–2)	17 – Tie	14 – Tshiebwe	4 – Tie	Auburn Arena (9,121); Auburn, AL
January 25, 2022; 9:00 p.m., ESPN	No. 12	Mississippi State	W 82–74 ^{OT}	16–4 (6–2)	21 – Tshiebwe	22 – Tshiebwe	6 – Wheeler	Rupp Arena (18,144); Lexington, KY
January 29, 2022*; 6:00 p.m., ESPN	No. 12	at No. 5 Kansas; Big 12/SEC Challenge	W 80–62	17–4	27 – Brooks Jr.	14 – Tshiebwe	8 – Wheeler	Allen Fieldhouse (16,300); Lawrence, KS
February 2, 2022; 7:00 p.m., SECN	No. 5	Vanderbilt	W 77–70	18–4 (7–2)	21 – Mintz	17 – Tshiebwe	9 – Wheeler	Rupp Arena (19,418); Lexington, KY
February 5, 2022; 8:00 p.m., ESPN	No. 5	at Alabama	W 66–55	19–4 (8–2)	15 – Washington Jr.	15 – Tshiebwe	7 – Wheeler	Coleman Coliseum (12,477); Tuscaloosa, AL
February 8, 2022; 7:00 p.m., ESPN	No. 5	at South Carolina	W 86–76	20–4 (9–2)	18 – Tshiebwe	14 – Tshiebwe	11 – Wheeler	Colonial Life Arena (12,009); Columbia, SC
February 12, 2022; 4:00 p.m., ESPN	No. 5	Florida; Rivalry	W 78–57	21–4 (10–2)	27 – Tshiebwe	19 – Tshiebwe	6 – Tie	Rupp Arena (20,383); Lexington, KY
February 15, 2022; 9:00 p.m., ESPN	No. 4	at No. 16 Tennessee; Rivalry	L 63–76	21–5 (10–3)	13 – Tshiebwe	15 – Tshiebwe	5 – Wheeler	Thompson–Boling Arena (21,768); Knoxville, TN
February 19, 2022; 1:00 p.m., CBS	No. 4	No. 25 Alabama	W 90–81	22–5 (11–3)	25 – Grady	14 – Tshiebwe	3 – Tie	Rupp Arena (20,374); Lexington, KY
February 23, 2022; 9:00 p.m., ESPN	No. 6	LSU	W 71–66	23–5 (12–3)	17 – Tshiebwe	16 – Tshiebwe	3 – Grady	Rupp Arena (20,199); Lexington, KY
February 26, 2022; 2:00 p.m., CBS	No. 6	at No. 18 Arkansas	L 73–75	23–6 (12–4)	30 – Tshiebwe	18 – Tshiebwe	5 – Wheeler	Bud Walton Arena (19,200); Fayetteville, AR
March 1, 2022; 7:00 p.m., ESPN	No. 7	Ole Miss	W 83–72	24–6 (13–4)	18 – Tshiebwe	15 – Tshiebwe	7 – Wheeler	Rupp Arena (20,322); Lexington, KY
March 5, 2022; 2:00 p.m., CBS	No. 7	at Florida; Rivalry	W 71–63	25–6 (14–4)	27 – Tshiebwe	15 – Tshiebwe	5 – Washington Jr.	O'Connell Center (9,788); Gainesville, FL
SEC Tournament
March 11, 2022; 8:00 p.m., SECN	(3) No. 5	vs. (11) Vanderbilt; Quarterfinals	W 77–71	26–6	25 – Washington Jr.	14 – Tshiebwe	11 – Wheeler	Amalie Arena (17,132); Tampa, FL
March 12, 2022; 3:00 p.m., ESPN	(3) No. 5	vs. (2) No. 9т Tennessee; Semifinals	L 62–69	26–7	19 – Brooks Jr.	11 – Tshiebwe	4 – Washington Jr.	Amalie Arena; Tampa, FL
NCAA tournament
March 17, 2022*; 7:10 pm, CBS	(2 E) No. 7	vs. (15 E) Saint Peter’s; First Round	L 79–85 ^{OT}	26–8	30 – Tshiebwe	16 – Tshiebwe	6 – Wheeler	Gainbridge Fieldhouse; Indianapolis, IN
*Non-conference game. ^{#}Rankings from AP Poll. (#) Tournament seedings in parentheses. All times are in Eastern Time.

== Rankings ==
Ranking movements Legend: ██ Increase in ranking ██ Decrease in ranking т = Tied with team above or below
	Week																			
Poll	Pre	1	2	3	4	5	6	7	8	9	10	11	12	13	14	15	16	17	18	Final
AP	10	13	10	9	10	21	20	18	16	18	12	12	5	5	4	6	7	5	7	Not released
Coaches	11	11*	13т	10	12	21	18	17	13	17	12	13	7	4	3	3	6	5	6	16т

*No poll released

== See also ==
- 2021–22 Kentucky Wildcats women's basketball team
