= Daimion Collins =

American basketball player (born 2002)

No. 6 – Austin Spurs
- Position: Power forward
- League: NBA G League

Personal information
- Born: October 28, 2002 (age 24) Atlanta, Texas, U.S.
- Listed height: 6 ft 9 in (2.06 m)
- Listed weight: 191 lb (87 kg)

Career information
- High school: Atlanta (Atlanta, Texas)
- College: Kentucky (2021–2023); LSU (2023–2025); South Florida (2025–2026)
- NBA draft: 2026: undrafted
- Playing career: 2026–present

Career history
- 2026–present: Austin Spurs

Career highlights
- McDonald's All-American (2021)

Daimion Collins (born October 28, 2002) is an American professional basketball player for the Austin Spurs of the NBA G League. He played college basketball for the Kentucky Wildcats, LSU Tigers and South Florida Bulls. He was a consensus five-star recruit and one of the top power forwards in the 2021 class.

== High school career ==
Collins played basketball for Atlanta High School in Atlanta, Texas. During his freshman year, he grew from 6 ft 3 in (1.91 m) to 6 ft 8 in (2.03 m). As a junior, Collins averaged 24.6 points, 13.7 rebounds and 7.7 blocks per game. In his senior season, he averaged 35.2 points, 14.4 rebounds, seven assists and 6.2 blocks per game, earning Texas Gatorade Player of the Year and District 14-3A MVP honors. He was named to the McDonald's All-American Game and Jordan Brand Classic rosters.

=== Recruiting ===
Collins was a consensus five-star recruit and one of the top power forwards in the 2021 class. On October 31, 2020, he committed to playing college basketball for Kentucky over offers from Kansas, Oklahoma, Texas and Texas Tech.

College recruiting
Name	Hometown	School	Height	Weight	Commit date
Daimion Collins; PF	Atlanta, TX	Atlanta (TX)	6 ft 9 in (2.06 m)	210 lb (95 kg)	Oct 31, 2020
Daimion Collins; PF	Recruit ratings: Rivals: 247Sports: ESPN: (92)				
Overall recruit ranking: Rivals: 18 247Sports: 13 ESPN: 19
Note: In many cases, Scout, Rivals, 247Sports, On3, and ESPN may conflict in their listings of height and weight.; In these cases, the average was taken. ESPN grades are on a 100-point scale.; Sources: "Kentucky 2021 Basketball Commitments". Rivals.; "2021 Kentucky Wildcats Recruiting Class". ESPN.; "2021 Team Ranking". Rivals.

== College career ==
During his freshman year at Kentucky, Collins played in 27 games with one start. He scored 78 points, had 55 rebounds and had 20 blocks. During his sophomore year, Collins appeared in 20 games with one start. He averaged 1.9 points and 1.9 rebounds per game.

On April 21, 2023, Collins announced he was transferring to Louisiana State University. Collins' father died unexpectedly before the last season tipped off and John Calipari said it took such a toll on him that Collins lost 15 pounds.

During his junior year, his season play was limited to just six games after dislocating his shoulder during the November 24 game with North Florida. He was having one of his best games of the season when the injury happened. He met the criteria for a medical redshirt during the season.

On September 23, 2024, Collins was fully cleared for all basketball related activities.

== Professional career ==
On October 8, 2026, Collins signed a contract to join the Austin Spurs.

== Career statistics ==
Legend
GP	Games played	GS	Games started	MPG	Minutes per game
FG%	Field goal percentage	3P%	3-point field goal percentage	FT%	Free throw percentage
RPG	Rebounds per game	APG	Assists per game	SPG	Steals per game
BPG	Blocks per game	PPG	Points per game	**Bold**	Career high

=== College ===
Year	Team	GP	GS	MPG	FG%	3P%	FT%	RPG	APG	SPG	BPG	PPG
2021–22	Kentucky	27	1	7.4	.577	.000	**.857**	2.0	0.1	0.2	0.7	2.9
2022–23	Kentucky	25	1	7.9	.425	.000	.619	1.9	0.2	0.2	0.4	1.9
2023–24	LSU	6	0	10.3	**.625**	**.500**	.833	2.2	0.0	**0.5**	0.7	4.3
2024–25	LSU	30	**22**	**20.4**	.581	.206	.613	**4.3**	**0.5**	**0.5**	**1.6**	**8.0**
2025–26	South Florida	**33**	1	14.1	.582	.158	.600	3.2	0.4	0.2	1.4	4.0
**Career**		**121**	**25**	**12.7**	**.566**	**.180**	**.653**	**2.9**	**0.3**	**0.3**	**1.1**	**4.3**
