= CJ Fredrick =

American basketball player (born 1999)

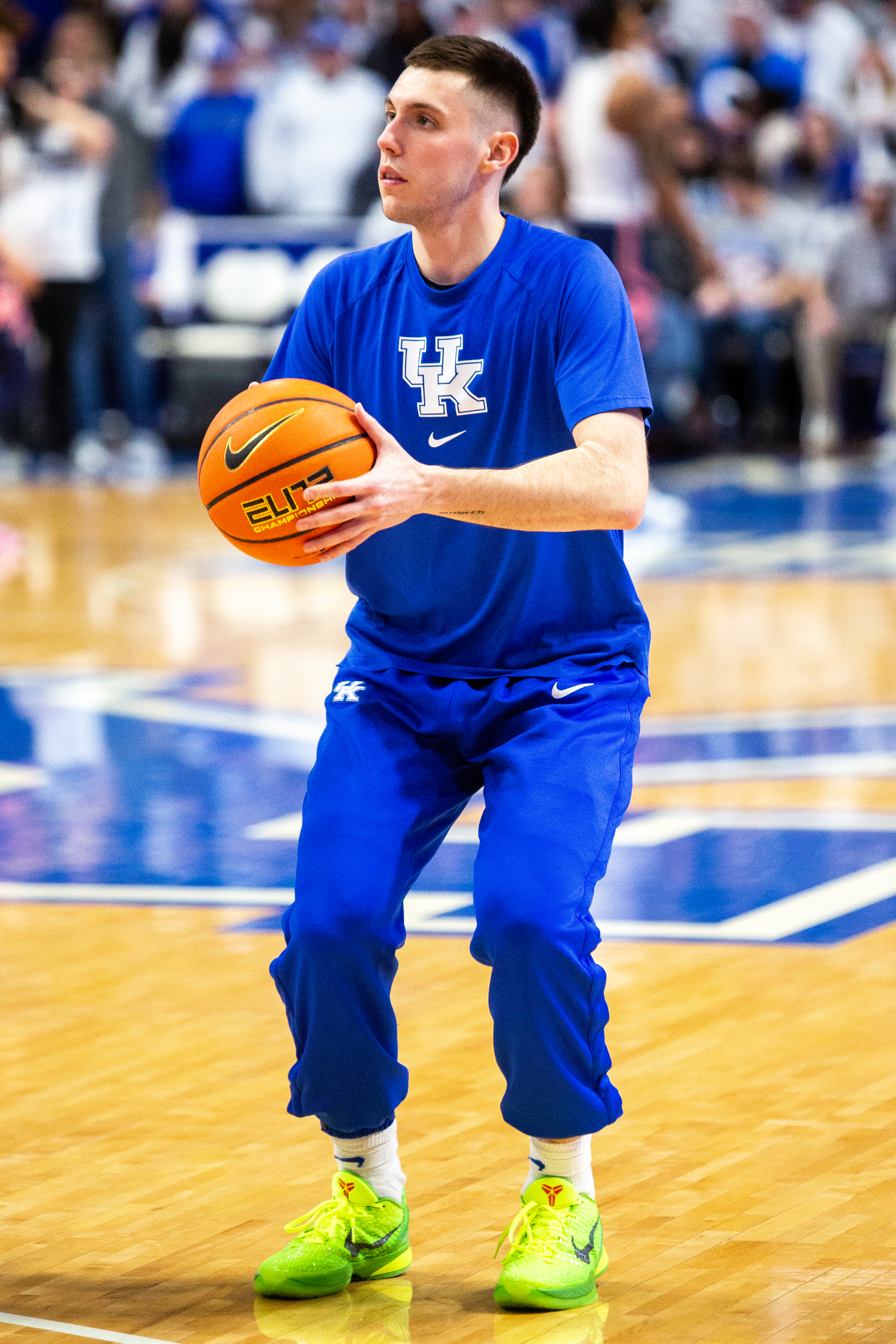
- Fredrick with Kentucky in 2023

Personal information
- Born: July 10, 1999 (age 27) Cincinnati, Ohio, U.S.
- Listed height: 6 ft 3 in (1.91 m)
- Listed weight: 185 lb (84 kg)

Career information
- High school: Covington Catholic (Park Hills, Kentucky)
- College: Iowa (2019–2021); Kentucky (2022–2023); Cincinnati (2023–2025)
- Position: Shooting guard
- Number: 5

Career highlights
- Big Ten All-Freshman Team (2020)

CJ Fredrick (born July 10, 1999) is an American former college basketball player. He previously played for the Iowa Hawkeyes, Kentucky Wildcats and the Cincinnati Bearcats.

== High school career ==
Fredrick played basketball for Covington Catholic High School in Park Hills, Kentucky. As a senior, he was named Kentucky Gatorade Player of the Year. He led his team to a state championship and set program single-season records with 900 points and 107 three-pointers. Fredrick committed to playing college basketball for Iowa over offers from Butler, Indiana and Xavier.

== College career ==
Fredrick redshirted his freshman year after sustaining a rib injury in practice. As a freshman at Iowa, Fredrick averaged 10.2 points and 2.8 assists per game, earning Big Ten All-Freshman Team honors. After the season, he underwent surgery for a stress fracture in his right foot. As a sophomore, he averaged 7.5 points per game, playing through a lingering foot injury for much of the season. Fredrick was named All-Big Ten Honorable Mention by the media. On May 5, 2021, he transferred to Kentucky. However, he suffered a hamstring injury during warmups for Kentucky's season opener against Duke, after having had to rehabilitate an earlier injury to the same leg during the offseason and preseason. Fredrick had surgery to repair his hamstring during the week of November 13 and missed the entire 2021–22 season. On April 16, 2022, Fredrick announced that he would return to Kentucky for the 2022-23 season.

On April 24, 2023 Fredrick announced that he would transfer to Cincinnati for the 2023-24 season.

== Career statistics ==
Legend
GP	Games played	GS	Games started	MPG	Minutes per game
FG%	Field goal percentage	3P%	3-point field goal percentage	FT%	Free throw percentage
RPG	Rebounds per game	APG	Assists per game	SPG	Steals per game
BPG	Blocks per game	PPG	Points per game	**Bold**	Career high

=== College ===
Year	Team	GP	GS	MPG	FG%	3P%	FT%	RPG	APG	SPG	BPG	PPG
2018–19	Iowa	Redshirt										
2019–20	Iowa	25	25	**28.7**	**.483**	.461	.795	**1.9**	**2.8**	**0.7**	**0.2**	**10.2**
2020–21	Iowa	**27**	**27**	24.7	.474	**.474**	.676	1.1	1.9	0.4	0.1	7.5
2021–22	Kentucky	Medical Redshirt										
2022–23	Kentucky	27	15	22.2	.351	.318	**.917**	0.8	1.5	0.5	0.0	6.1
2023–24	Cincinnati	15	10	20.6	.417	.426	.727	1.0	1.5	0.2	0.1	6.1
Career		94	77	24.4	.435	.413	.779	1.2	2.0	0.5	0.1	7.6

== Personal life ==
He is married to former Kentucky women's basketball player Blair Green.
