= Ugonna Onyenso =

Nigerian basketball player (born 2004)

No. 34 – Detroit Pistons
- Position: Center
- League: NBA

Personal information
- Born: 25 September 2004 (age 22) Owerri, Nigeria
- Listed height: 6 ft 11 in (2.11 m)
- Listed weight: 225 lb (102 kg)

Career information
- High school: NBA Academy Africa (Thiès, Senegal); Putnam Science Academy (Putnam, Connecticut)
- College: Kentucky (2022–2024); Kansas State (2024–2025); Virginia (2025–2026)
- NBA draft: 2026: 2nd round, 53rd overall pick
- Drafted by: Houston Rockets
- Playing career: 2026–present

Career history
- 2026–present: Detroit Pistons
- 2026–present: →Motor City Cruise

Career highlights
- ACC All-Defensive team (2026)
- Stats at NBA.com
- Stats at Basketball Reference

Ugonna Kingsley Onyenso (born 25 September 2004) is a Nigerian basketball player for the Detroit Pistons of the National Basketball Association (NBA), on a two-way contract with the Motor City Cruise of the NBA G League. He played college basketball for the Kentucky Wildcats, Kansas State Wildcats and Virginia Cavaliers. He has also played for the Nigeria national team, where he was the youngest player to ever play for the team at age 17.

Onyenso was selected with the 53rd overall pick in the 2026 NBA draft by the Houston Rockets, traded to the New York Knicks, then subsequently acquired by the Detroit Pistons.

== Early career ==
Born in Owerri, Onyenso played football as a kid before a local coach proposed playing basketball to him. Kingsley was a student-athlete at the NBA Academy Africa in Thiès, Senegal, where he played for three years.

In January 2021, he moved to the United States to play for the Putnam Science Academy in Putnam, Connecticut. With Putnam, Onyenso averaged 13.2 points, 9.2 rebounds and 2.7 blocks per game as the team went 20–0 during his tenure there.

In August 2021, he also played for Team England of the Amateur Athletic Union (AAU). He played in the 2022 NBA Academy Games and averaged 13.2 points, 9.2 rebounds and 2.7 blocks per game.

== College career ==
On August 2, 2022, Onyenso committed to Kentucky, choosing them over Kansas, Memphis and Oklahoma. He played sparingly as a freshman. Onyenso missed the first month on his sophomore season with a foot injury but averaged 3.6 points, 4.8 rebounds and 2.8 blocked shots per game. Following the season, he entered the 2024 NBA draft before withdrawing and transferring to Kansas State. Onyenso averaged 2.8 points, 2.4 rebounds and 0.9 blocks per game for Kansas State. He entered the transfer portal again after the season, ultimately landing at Virginia. Onyenso averaged 6.5 points and 4.9 rebounds per game in 36 games. He was named to the ACC All-Defensive team.

== Professional career ==
On June 24, 2026, Onyenso was selected by the Houston Rockets with the 53rd overall pick in the 2026 NBA draft, afterward was traded to the New York Knicks, and lastly to the Detroit Pistons for cash considerations. He was later signed to a two-way contract with the Pistons.

== National team career ==
In November 2021, Onyenso was selected for the Nigeria national senior team by coach Julius Nwosu. In his debut, he scored 10 points, four rebounds and two blocks in 16 minutes against Uganda. At age 17, he became the youngest player in history to play for the Nigerian national team.

== Career statistics ==
Legend
GP	Games played	GS	Games started	MPG	Minutes per game
FG%	Field goal percentage	3P%	3-point field goal percentage	FT%	Free throw percentage
RPG	Rebounds per game	APG	Assists per game	SPG	Steals per game
BPG	Blocks per game	PPG	Points per game	**Bold**	Career high

=== College ===
Year	Team	GP	GS	MPG	FG%	3P%	FT%	RPG	APG	SPG	BPG	PPG
2022–23	Kentucky	16	0	6.9	.529	-	.571	2.6	.1	.2	1.0	2.5
2023–24	Kentucky	24	**14**	**18.8**	.550	.000	.588	4.8	.2	.3	2.8	3.6
2024–25	Kansas State	24	2	11.0	**.700**	-	**.769**	2.4	.1	.3	.9	2.8
2025–26	Virginia	**36**	0	18.6	.568	**.278**	.727	**4.9**	**.6**	**.6**	**2.9**	**6.5**
Career		100	16	15.0	.578	.270	.673	3.9	.3	.4	2.1	4.3

== Personal life ==
Onyenso is the son of Martins and Lilian Chinyere, and he has four siblings.
