= D. J. Wagner =

American basketball player (born 2005)

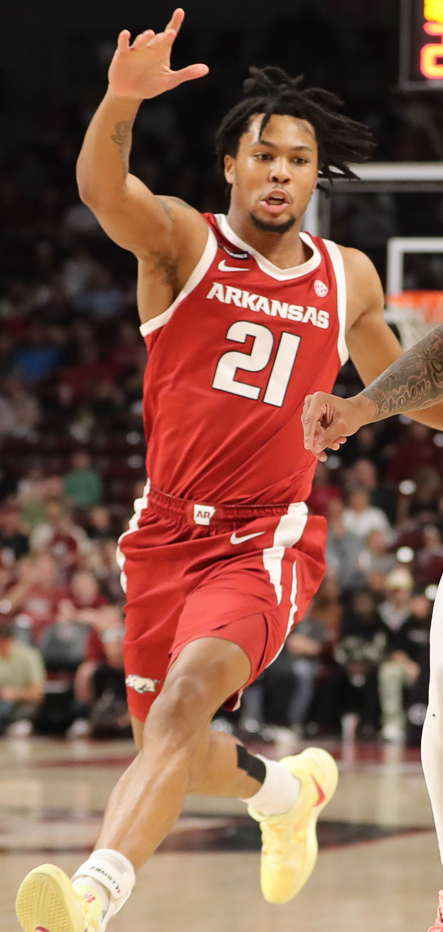

No. 2 – Maryland Terrapins
- Position: Point guard / shooting guard
- Conference: Big Ten Conference

Personal information
- Born: May 4, 2005 (age 21) Camden, New Jersey, U.S.
- Listed height: 6 ft 4 in (1.93 m)
- Listed weight: 190 lb (86 kg)

Career information
- High school: Camden (Camden, New Jersey)
- College: Kentucky (2023–2024); Arkansas (2024–2026); Maryland (2026–present)

Career highlights
- SEC All-Freshman Team (2024); McDonald's All-American Game Co-MVP (2023); Jordan Brand Classic (2023); Nike Hoop Summit (2023)
Medals
Men's basketball
Representing United States
FIBA U17 World Cup
Gold medal – first place	2022 Spain	Team

Dajuan Marquette Wagner Jr. (born May 4, 2005) is an American college basketball player for the Maryland Terrapins of the Big Ten Conference. He previously played for the Kentucky Wildcats and Arkansas Razorbacks. He is the son of former professional player Dajuan Wagner and grandson of professional player Milt Wagner. He was a consensus five-star recruit and one of the top players in the 2023 high school class.

== High school career ==
During the summer heading into his freshman season at Camden High School, Wagner was one of just three class of 2023 prospects invited to the USA Basketball July mini-camp in Colorado Springs. He was invited back to a second USA Basketball event several months later, before the start of the high school basketball season in New Jersey.

In his first game, on December 20, 2019, in front of a capacity crowd that waited more than an hour to try to get admission into the game, Wagner scored 15 points despite missing 6 of his first 7 field goal attempts.

Coached by former NBA player Rick Brunson, Wagner helped lead Camden to 25 consecutive victories before the team's season was ended prematurely due to the COVID-19 pandemic. Camden earned New Jersey Boys Basketball Team of the Year honors by NJ.com.

As a freshman, Wagner averaged 18.5 points en route to earning MaxPreps Freshman All-American honors. On January 24, 2023 Wagner became the first third-generation McDonald's All-American, joining both his father Dajuan and grandfather Milt.

As a junior, he averaged 19.6 points, 4.3 rebounds, 3.3 assists, and 3.1 steals per game, helping Camden to the NJSIAA Group 2 state championship. As a senior, he averaged 22.5 points and 3.3 rebounds per game, leading his team to a 23–2 record.

=== Recruiting ===
Wagner was a consensus five-star recruit and one of the top players in the 2023 class, according to major recruiting services. In the middle of his junior season, Wagner saw his ranking of number one player in the class of 2023 drop to third by Rivals after holding the reign of consensus number one pick in the class of 2023 for two years since 2020. On November 14, 2022, Wagner committed to playing college basketball for Kentucky over an offer from Louisville.

College recruiting
Name	Hometown	School	Height	Weight	Commit date
D. J. Wagner; PG / SG	Camden, NJ	Camden (NJ)	6 ft 3 in (1.91 m)	175 lb (79 kg)	Nov 14, 2022
D. J. Wagner; PG / SG	Recruit ratings: Rivals: 247Sports: ESPN: (93)				
Overall recruit ranking: Rivals: 6 247Sports: 6 ESPN: 4
Note: In many cases, Scout, Rivals, 247Sports, On3, and ESPN may conflict in their listings of height and weight.; In these cases, the average was taken. ESPN grades are on a 100-point scale.; Sources: "Kentucky 2023 Basketball Commitments". Rivals.; "2023 Kentucky Wildcats Recruiting Class". ESPN.; "2023 Team Ranking". Rivals.

== College career ==
At the end of his freshman season on April 15, 2024, he entered the transfer portal. On May 27, he announced he would be joining John Calipari & the rest of his coaching staff at Arkansas for the next upcoming season.

== Career statistics ==
Legend
GP	Games played	GS	Games started	MPG	Minutes per game
FG%	Field goal percentage	3P%	3-point field goal percentage	FT%	Free throw percentage
RPG	Rebounds per game	APG	Assists per game	SPG	Steals per game
BPG	Blocks per game	PPG	Points per game	**Bold**	Career high

=== College ===
class="sortbottom"

Year	Team	GP	GS	MPG	FG%	3P%	FT%	RPG	APG	SPG	BPG	PPG
2023–24	Kentucky	29	28	25.8	.405	.292	.766	1.9	3.3	.8	0.2	9.9
2024–25	Arkansas	**36**	**36**	**34.5**	.401	.304	**.817**	**2.7**	**3.6**	**1.0**	0.1	**11.2**
2025–26	Arkansas	35	19	23.6	**.429**	**.346**	.724	1.6	2.4	0.9	**0.3**	7.4
Career		100	83	28.1	.409	.306	.778	2.1	3.1	0.9	0.2	9.5

== Personal life ==
Wagner is the son of Dajuan Wagner and Syreeta Brittingham. Dajuan Wagner was the 6th pick in the 2002 NBA draft. His grandfather, Milt Wagner, was a second-round pick in the 1986 NBA draft. He is seeking to become the first-ever third-generation NBA player.
