= George Rogers Clark High School (Kentucky) =

Public school in Winchester, Kentucky, United States

Location
- 2745 Boonesboro Road; Winchester, KY 40391; 37.9610°N 84.2136°W

Information
- Type: Public
- Motto: "All students, College and Career ready"
- Established: 1963 (620 Boone Ave.). 2013 (2745 Boonesboro road)
- School district: Clark County Public Schools
- Principal: Justin Arms
- Teaching staff: 90.61 (FTE)
- Grades: 9–12
- Enrollment: 1,704 (2023–2024)
- Student to teacher ratio: 18.81
- Colors: Red and white
- Nickname: Cardinals
- Rival: Montgomery County Indians
- Feeder schools: Henry E. Baker Intermediate School and Robert Campbell Junior High School
- Website: https://www.grc.clarkschools.net/

George Rogers Clark High School is a public high school located in Winchester, Kentucky. It is the only high school in the Clark County School District.

== History ==
The school opened in the fall of 1963, consolidating Clark County High School and Winchester High School, locally referred to as county high and city high respectively. In 2011 construction began on a new building. In the fall of 2013, 50 years since the opening of the original facility, all student activity and faculty moved to the new facility, keeping the name "George Rogers Clark High School.” The new building has one athletic facility.

== Athletics ==
The school has a strong record in athletics, celebrating state championships in numerous sports. In 2026, both the boys' and girls' basketball teams won the state basketball championships at Rupp Arena. In the 2021–22 season, the boys' basketball team won the state basketball championship. In their 2022–23 season, they advanced to the finals, but lost 64–60 to Warren Central. The old Clark County High School boys' basketball team won the 1951 Kentucky High School Athletic Association (KHSAA) state title. In 2026, the GRC Lady Softball Cardinals advanced to the KHSAA state softball tournament for the first time since 2010. On June 6, 2026, GRC defeated Henderson Co. 2–1 to make the final four for the first time. In 1991, the football team won the KHSAA Class AAAA state championship, while the girls' track and field team won the KHSAA Class AAA state title. In 2008, the boys' varsity soccer team finished as runners-up in the state. In 1999 and 2013, the boys' golf team finished as runners-up in the state tournament. The GRC swim team competed in its first season during the 2005–2006 school year.

Another team is the Red and White Varsity Cheerleading Squad. Red and White were very successful, winning Eleven State Titles in: 2014, 2006, 2005, 2004, 2003, 2001, 2000, 1999, 1998, 1997, 1996, and 1995. As of 2008, the GRC cheerleaders no longer have a Red or White Varsity; they now have only one "Super Varsity". Their motto is "We Are Two". In 2009 they attended the UCA competition in Orlando and were ranked 14th in the nation. The Junior Varsity team, which was previously excluded in 1999, was recently recreated. The varsity team has 6 uniforms, made by Varsity Brands. In February 2010, the GRC Varsity won 4th place in Large Varsity Division II at the National High School Cheerleading Championship. The following week, they placed 3rd in state competition in Large Varsity. In 2010–2011 school year they competed in Nationals at the Medium Varsity Division I level place 10th and Medium in state and placing 3rd. In 2014, the George Rogers Clark Varsity squad earned the title of Kentucky State Champions.

== Other teams ==
The school's band is known as "Kentucky's Finest since 1963." The band currently has an enrollment of approximately 100 members. GRC competes in such venues as Bands of America, The Contest of Champions, and Kentucky Music Educators Association Sanctioned Contests.

The GRC Symphonic Band has performed at the Midwest International Band and Orchestra Clinic in Chicago, Illinois (1977) and has competed in Bands of America and National Adjudicators Invitational Concert Festivals.

The school also offers an academic team which has been successful on multiple levels, including competing at state for Governor's Cup individual assessment and quick recall. The school's Mock Trial team has also competed at a state level. GRC's Gay-Straight Alliance (GSA) participated in the Day of Silence in 2021 and 2022.

== Notable alumni ==
- Yeremiah Bell - NFL defensive back drafted by the Miami Dolphins in 2003 and selected to the 2009 Pro Bowl team.
- Matt Ginter - MLB pitcher drafted in the 1st round of the 1999 MLB draft by the Chicago White Sox.
