= Sahvir Wheeler =

American basketball player (born 2001)

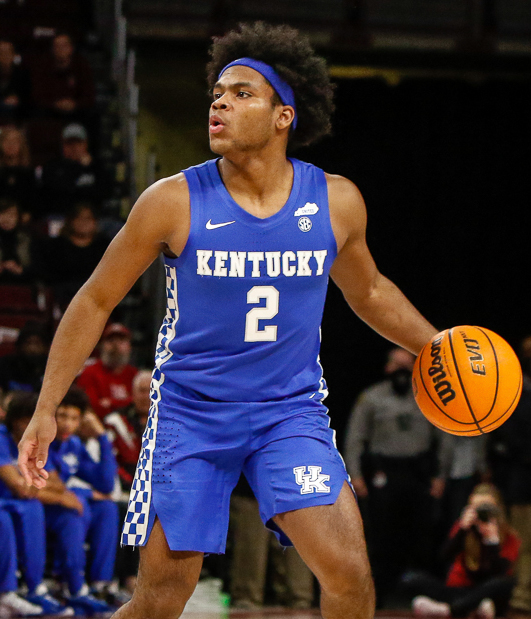
- Wheeler with Kentucky in 2022

Free agent
- Position: Point guard

Personal information
- Born: January 17, 2001 (age 25) Harlem, New York, U.S.
- Listed height: 5 ft 9 in (1.75 m)
- Listed weight: 180 lb (82 kg)

Career information
- High school: Houston Christian (Houston, Texas)
- College: Georgia (2019–2021); Kentucky (2021–2023); Washington (2023–2024)
- NBA draft: 2024: undrafted
- Playing career: 2024–present

Career history
- 2024–2025: Wisconsin Herd
- 2025: Leones de Santo Domingo

Career highlights
- 2× Second-team All-SEC (2021, 2022)

Sahvir Wheeler (born January 17, 2001) is an American professional basketball player who last played for Leones de Santo Domingo of the Liga Nacional de Baloncesto (LNB). He played college basketball for the Georgia Bulldogs, Kentucky Wildcats, and Washington Huskies.

== Early life ==
Wheeler was born in Harlem, New York and grew up in Houston, Texas. He attended Houston Christian High School, where he averaged 19 points, nine assists and seven rebounds per game as a senior. Wheeler originally committed to playing college basketball for Texas A&M but reopened his recruitment after head coach Billy Kennedy was fired. He later committed to Georgia, choosing the Bulldogs over Iowa State. Wheeler was considered a four-star recruit by most services.

== College career ==
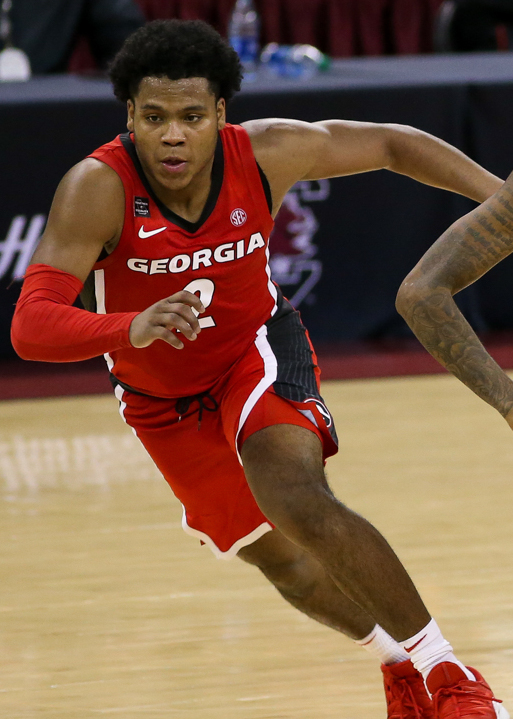
Wheeler with Georgia in 2020

=== Georgia ===
As a freshman at Georgia, Wheeler averaged nine points and 4.5 assists per game. He set a program freshman record with 139 assists. In his sophomore season, Wheeler assumed a leading role with the departure of Anthony Edwards. On February 23, 2021, he recorded the first triple-double in program history, with 14 points, 13 assists and 11 rebounds in a 91–78 win over LSU. As a sophomore, Wheeler averaged 14 points, an SEC-leading 7.4 assists and 3.9 rebounds per game. He was a consensus Second Team All-SEC selection and set the program single-season record for assists.

=== Kentucky ===
On May 17, 2021, Wheeler announced he would transfer to Kentucky. Wheeler put up a game high 26 points in a 98–69 victory over North Carolina. Wheeler had a career high 14 assists in a 86–52 win vs North Florida. He was named to the Second Team All-SEC. Wheeler was named a finalist for the Bob Cousy Award. The following season, he averaged 7.7 points and 5.6 assists before being sidelined by injuries. He entered the transfer portal following the conclusion of his second season at Kentucky.

=== Washington ===
On April 26, 2023, Wheeler announced that he would be transferring to the University of Washington to play for the Washington Huskies.

== Professional career ==
=== Wisconsin Herd (2024–2025) ===
After going undrafted in the 2024 NBA draft, Wheeler joined the Maine Celtics on October 26, 2024 and on November 3, he was traded to the Memphis Hustle. However, he was waived on November 7 and re-signed four days later. However, he was waived once again on November 23 and on December 28, he joined the Wisconsin Herd. On January 8, 2025, he was waived by the Herd.

== Career statistics ==
Legend
GP	Games played	GS	Games started	MPG	Minutes per game
FG%	Field goal percentage	3P%	3-point field goal percentage	FT%	Free throw percentage
RPG	Rebounds per game	APG	Assists per game	SPG	Steals per game
BPG	Blocks per game	PPG	Points per game	**Bold**	Career high

=== College ===
Year	Team	GP	GS	MPG	FG%	3P%	FT%	RPG	APG	SPG	BPG	PPG
2019–20	Georgia	**31**	17	27.3	**.472**	.320	.699	2.5	4.5	.8	.0	9.0
2020–21	Georgia	26	25	**34.8**	.399	.225	.738	**3.8**	**7.4**	**1.7**	.0	14.0
2021–22	Kentucky	30	**29**	31.2	.441	.308	**.780**	2.6	6.9	1.1	.1	10.1
2022–23	Kentucky	21	14	28.6	.417	**.366**	.533	2.3	5.6	.9	.1	7.7
2023–24	Washington	**31**	**29**	33.9	.436	.267	.645	3.5	6.1	1.3	**.2**	**14.3**
Career		139	114	31.2	.432	.284	.694	2.9	6.1	1.2	.1	11.2
