= Ronald Coleman (basketball) =

American basketball coach

Ron Coleman
Current position
- Title: Associate head coach
- Team: Arkansas
- Conference: SEC

Biographical details
- Born: Chicago, Illinois, U.S.

Playing career
- 1992–1993: Weber State
- 1994–1997: Lamar
- Position: Point guard

Coaching career (HC unless noted)
- 2011–2012: Colorado State (assistant)
- 2012: Nebraska (director of player development)
- 2012–2015: Bradley (assistant)
- 2015–2017: UIC (assistant)
- 2017–2021: Illinois (assistant)
- 2021–2024: Kentucky (assistant)
- 2024–present: Arkansas (Associate HC)

Accomplishments and honors

Awards
- First-team All-Sun Belt (1995–1997)

Ronald "Chin" Coleman is an American basketball coach who is currently an associate head coach at the University of Arkansas.

== Playing career ==
A native of Chicago, Illinois, Coleman graduated from South Shore High School and played high school basketball team during his time there. After graduating from high school in 1992, Coleman spent his freshman year of college at Weber State University in Ogden, Utah, and appeared in 25 games for the Wildcats. Coleman transferred after his freshman year to Lamar University in Beaumont, Texas, and sat out during the 1993–94 season due to NCAA transfer rules. As starting point guard for the Cardinals, Coleman led his team in scoring three straight seasons and was named first team All Sun Belt Conference in each of those seasons.

After graduating from Lamar University with a bachelor's degree in applied arts and sciences, Coleman played professional basketball over the course of seven years appearing in training camp with the Houston Rockets and in Latvia and Finland.

== Coaching career ==
In 2005, Coleman returned to the United States and began his career in coaching with Chicago-based AAU basketball Mac Irvin Fire. Coleman served as head coach for the program until 2011 and led his team to top-three overall finishes at the Nike Elite Youth Basketball League in 2009 and 2010. During this time, Coleman also served in coaching roles at two schools in the Chicago Public League Coleman was head coach for Benjamin E. Mays Academy for one season, leading his team to a perfect 35–0 record and the District 299 City Championship. From 2007–2011 he served as the associate head coach for Whitney Young, and helped guide them to a Class 4A state title in 2009.

In 2011 Coleman made the transition to college coaching after accepting an assistant coach position on Tim Miles staff at Colorado State. The following season, Coleman followed Miles to Nebraska to serve as the director of player development, but left prior to the start of the 2012–13 season to accept an assistant coach position on Geno Ford's staff at Bradley. After three seasons at Bradley, Coleman moved back to Chicago to accept an assistant coach position under Steve McClain at the University of Illinois at Chicago.

In 2017, Coleman was then hired on to Brad Underwood's staff as an assistant coach at Illinois. Four years later he left the school in 2021 to coach at the University of Kentucky as an assistant coach under head coach John Calipari. Coleman followed Calipari to Arkansas, where he was given the position of Associate Head Coach.
