= Au'Diese Toney =

American basketball player (born 1999)

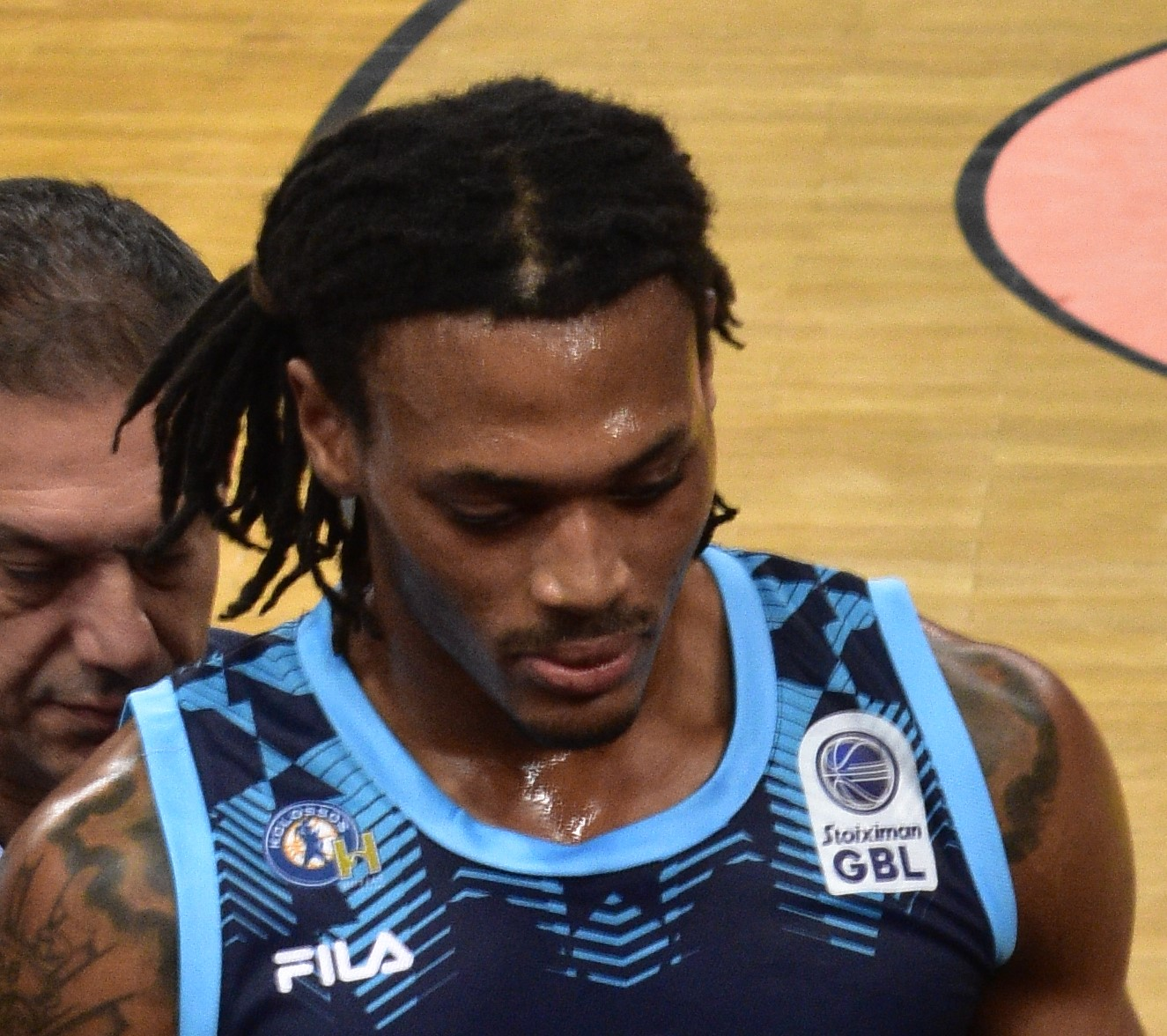
- Toney with Kolossos Rodou in 2024

No. 5 – Osceola Magic
- Position: Shooting guard
- League: NBA G League

Personal information
- Born: November 12, 1999 (age 27) Birmingham, Alabama, U.S.
- Listed height: 6 ft 6 in (1.98 m)
- Listed weight: 205 lb (93 kg)

Career information
- High school: Columbia (Huntsville, Alabama); Northwood Temple Academy (Fayetteville, North Carolina); Trinity Christian (Fayetteville, North Carolina)
- College: Pittsburgh (2018–2021); Arkansas (2021–2022)
- NBA draft: 2022: undrafted
- Playing career: 2022–present

Career history
- 2022–2023: Lakeland Magic
- 2023–2024: Grand Rapids Gold
- 2024: Kolossos Rodou
- 2025: Bashkimi
- 2025–2026: Noblesville Boom
- 2026–present: Osceola Magic
- Stats at NBA.com
- Stats at Basketball Reference

Au'Diese Mavaire Toney (born November 12, 1999) is an American professional basketball player for the Osceola Magic of the NBA G League. He played college basketball for the Pittsburgh Panthers and Arkansas Razorbacks.

== High school career ==
Toney started his high school career at Columbia High School in Huntsville, Alabama before moving to Northwood Temple Academy in Fayetteville, North Carolina. In his junior season at Trinity Christian School in Fayetteville, he averaged 14.1 points and 7.5 rebounds per game. Toney teamed with future Duke player Joey Baker to lead Trinity to a 25–6 record and an NCISAA 1A state championship. Toney reclassified to the 2018 class, allowing him to bypass his senior season. He committed to playing college basketball for Pittsburgh in June 2018 over offers from Virginia Tech, Ole Miss and Georgia Tech.

== College career ==
In his college debut against Youngstown State, Toney recorded 12 points and nine rebounds. As a freshman at Pittsburgh, Toney averaged 7.5 points and 5.6 rebounds per game but saw his production decline in conference play. On January 28, 2020, he scored a career-high 27 points in a 79–67 loss to Duke. In his sophomore season, Toney averaged 9.5 points and 4.8 rebounds per game. He missed a game against Florida State on February 20, 2021, due to sustaining a concussion in a car accident. As a junior, he averaged 14.4 points and 5.9 rebounds per game in 16 games, before entering the transfer portal on February 25. For his senior season, Toney transferred to Arkansas. On November 23, he posted 19 points and nine rebounds in a 73–67 victory against Cincinnati to win the Hall of Fame Classic, and was named tournament MVP.

== Professional career ==
=== Lakeland Magic (2022–2023) ===
On November 3, 2022, Toney was named to the opening night roster for the Lakeland Magic.

=== Grand Rapids Gold (2023–2024) ===
On October 13, 2023, Toney signed with the Denver Nuggets, but was waived on October 18. On October 30, he joined the Grand Rapids Gold.

=== Kolossos Rodou (2024) ===
On July 25, 2024, Toney signed with Kolossos Rodou of the Greek Basketball League (GBL).

=== Bashkimi (2025) ===
On February 6, 2025, Toney signed with Bashkimi of the Kosovo Superleague and Liga Unike.

=== Osceola Magic (2026–present) ===
On September 23, 2026, Toney signed an Exhibit 10 contract with the Orlando Magic, but was waived by the team the same day.

== Career statistics ==
Legend
GP	Games played	GS	Games started	MPG	Minutes per game
FG%	Field goal percentage	3P%	3-point field goal percentage	FT%	Free throw percentage
RPG	Rebounds per game	APG	Assists per game	SPG	Steals per game
BPG	Blocks per game	PPG	Points per game	**Bold**	Career high

=== College ===
Year	Team	GP	GS	MPG	FG%	3P%	FT%	RPG	APG	SPG	BPG	PPG
2018–19	Pittsburgh	32	28	25.2	.360	.246	.663	5.6	.5	.7	.1	7.5
2019–20	Pittsburgh	31	25	30.5	.461	.328	.655	4.8	1.2	1.2	.1	9.5
2020–21	Pittsburgh	16	16	**34.9**	.464	**.340**	.667	**5.9**	**2.3**	**1.3**	.1	**14.4**
2021–22	Arkansas	**36**	**33**	32.4	**.521**	.290	**.781**	5.2	.8	.6	**.5**	10.5
Career		115	102	30.2	.452	.300	.705	5.3	1.0	.9	.2	9.9

== Personal life ==
Toney is a cousin of professional basketball players John Petty Jr. and Trevor Lacey.
