= 2021–22 Arkansas Razorbacks men's basketball team =

American college basketball season

2021–22 Arkansas Razorbacks men's basketball

Hall of Fame Classic champions

NCAA tournament, Elite Eight
- Conference: Southeastern Conference

Ranking
- Coaches: No. 8
- AP: No. 17
- Record: 28–9 (13–5 SEC)
- Head coach: Eric Musselman (3rd season)
- Assistant coaches: Gus Argenal (1st season); Clay Moser (3rd season); Keith Smart (1st season)
- Home arena: Bud Walton Arena (Capacity: 19,368)

2021–22 Southeastern Conference men's basketball standings
	Conf.				Overall
Team	W		L	PCT	W		L	PCT
No. 14 Auburn	15	–	3	.833	28	–	6	.824
No. 16 Kentucky	14	–	4	.778	26	–	8	.765
No. 15 Tennessee †	14	–	4	.778	27	–	8	.771
No. 8 Arkansas	13	–	5	.722	28	–	9	.757
LSU	9	–	9	.500	22	–	12	.647
Alabama	9	–	9	.500	19	–	14	.576
South Carolina	9	–	9	.500	18	–	13	.581
Texas A&M	9	–	9	.500	27	–	13	.675
Florida	9	–	9	.500	20	–	14	.588
Mississippi State	8	–	10	.444	18	–	16	.529
Vanderbilt	7	–	11	.389	19	–	17	.528
Missouri	5	–	13	.278	12	–	21	.364
Ole Miss	4	–	14	.222	13	–	19	.406
Georgia	1	–	17	.056	6	–	26	.188
† 2022 SEC tournament winner Rankings from AP poll

The 2021–22 Arkansas Razorbacks men's basketball team represented the University of Arkansas during the 2021–22 NCAA Division I men's basketball season. The team was led by third-year head coach Eric Musselman, and played its home games at Bud Walton Arena in Fayetteville, Arkansas, as a member of the Southeastern Conference.

== Previous season ==
The Razorbacks finished second in the SEC standings and earned a 3 seed in the NCAA Tournament's South Regional. Arkansas advanced to the Sweet Sixteen of the NCAA Tournament for the first time since the 1995–96 season, and then to the Elite Eight for the first time since the 1994–95 season. Freshman guard Moses Moody was named the SEC Freshman of the Year, 1st Team All-SEC, a freshman All-American, and AP Honorable Mention All-American. Moody was a lottery pick, drafted by the Golden State Warriors with the 14th pick in the 2021 NBA draft. He was the first "one-and-done" player in school history.

The Razorbacks finished the season with an overall record of 25–7, 13–4 in SEC play, and finished ranked No. 6 in the Coaches Poll and No. 10 in the AP Poll.

== Offseason ==
=== Departures ===
Name	Number	Pos.	Height	Weight	Year	Hometown	Notes
Justin Smith	0	F	6'7"	230	Senior	Buffalo Grove, Illinois	Graduated
Vance Jackson	2	F	6'9"	238	Senior	Pasadena, California	Graduated
Jalen Tate	11	G	6'6"	175	Senior	Pickerington, Ohio	Graduated
Abayomi Iyiola	22	F	6'9"	230	Junior	Atlanta, Georgia	Transferred to Hofstra
Moses Moody	5	G	6'6"	205	Freshman	Little Rock, Arkansas	Declared for 2021 NBA draft
Ethan Henderson	24	F	6'8"	210	Junior	Little Rock, Arkansas	Transferred to Texas A&M
Desi Sills	3	G	6'2"	200	Junior	Jonesboro, Arkansas	Transferred to Arkansas State

=== Incoming transfers ===
Name	Number	Pos.	Height	Weight	Year	Hometown	Transfer from	Eligibility
Stanley Umude	0	G	6'6"	210	Graduate Student	San Antonio, Texas	South Dakota	One year, beginning immediately
Trey Wade	3	F	6'6"	220	Graduate Student	Marietta, Georgia	Wichita State	One year, beginning immediately
Au'Diese Toney	5	G	6'6"	205	Senior	Huntsville, Alabama	Pittsburgh	Two years, beginning immediately
Chris Lykes	11	G	5'7"	160	Graduate Student	Mitchellville, Maryland	Miami (FL)	One year, beginning immediately
Jaxson Robinson	14	G	6'6"	185	Sophomore	Ada, Oklahoma	Texas A&M	Four years, beginning immediately

=== 2021 recruiting class ===
College recruiting information
Name	Hometown	School	Height	Weight	Commit date
Chance Moore; SG	Powder Springs, GA	McEachern (GA)	6 ft 5 in (1.96 m)	195 lb (88 kg)	Aug 8, 2020
Chance Moore; SG	Recruit ratings: Rivals: 247Sports: ESPN: (85)				
Overall recruit ranking: Rivals: 65 247Sports: 51 ESPN: —
Note: In many cases, Scout, Rivals, 247Sports, On3, and ESPN may conflict in their listings of height and weight.; In these cases, the average was taken. ESPN grades are on a 100-point scale.; Sources: "Arkansas 2021 Basketball Commitments". Rivals.; "2021 Arkansas Razorbacks Recruiting Class". ESPN.; "2021 Team Ranking". Rivals.

=== 2022 Recruiting class ===
College recruiting information (2022)
Name	Hometown	School	Height	Weight	Commit date
Nick Smith Jr. PG / SG	North Little Rock, Arkansas	North Little Rock High School	6 ft 5 in (1.96 m)	185 lb (84 kg)	Sep 29, 2021
Nick Smith Jr. PG / SG	Recruit ratings: Rivals: 247Sports: ESPN: (93)				
Jordan Walsh; SF	Cedar Hill, Texas	Link Academy (Branson, MO)	6 ft 7 in (2.01 m)	195 lb (88 kg)	Oct 14, 2021
Jordan Walsh; SF	Recruit ratings: Rivals: 247Sports: ESPN: (93)				
Anthony Black; PG / SF	Duncanville, TX	Duncanville High School	6 ft 7 in (2.01 m)	190 lb (86 kg)	Mar 28, 2022
Anthony Black; PG / SF	Recruit ratings: Rivals: 247Sports: ESPN: (90)				
Derrian Ford; CG	Magnolia, AR	Magnolia High School	6 ft 4 in (1.93 m)	200 lb (91 kg)	Jul 14, 2021
Derrian Ford; CG	Recruit ratings: Rivals: 247Sports: ESPN: (83)				
Barry Dunning; SF	Mobile, AL	McGill-Toolen Catholic High School	6 ft 6 in (1.98 m)	205 lb (93 kg)	Jul 5, 2021
Barry Dunning; SF	Recruit ratings: Rivals: 247Sports: ESPN: (83)				
Joseph Pinion; SF	Morrilton, AR	Morrilton High School	6 ft 6 in (1.98 m)	185 lb (84 kg)	Oct 23, 2020
Joseph Pinion; SF	Recruit ratings: Rivals: 247Sports: ESPN: (82)				
Overall recruit ranking: Rivals: 2 247Sports: 2 ESPN: 2
Note: In many cases, Scout, Rivals, 247Sports, On3, and ESPN may conflict in their listings of height and weight.; In these cases, the average was taken. ESPN grades are on a 100-point scale.; Sources: "Arkansas 2021 Basketball Commitments". Rivals.; "2021 Team Ranking". Rivals.

== Roster ==
2021–22 Arkansas Razorbacks men's basketball team
Players
Coaches

Pos.	#	Name	Height	Weight	Year	Previous school	Hometown
G	0	Stanley Umude	6 ft 6 in (1.98 m)	210 lb (95 kg)	GS	Warren High School; South Dakota	San Antonio, Texas
G	1	JD Notae	6 ft 2 in (1.88 m)	190 lb (86 kg)	RS Sr	Newton HS; Jacksonville	Covington, Georgia
G	2	Khalen Robinson	6 ft 0 in (1.83 m)	180 lb (82 kg)	So	Oak Hill Academy	Little Rock, Arkansas
G	4	Davonte Davis	6 ft 4 in (1.93 m)	180 lb (82 kg)	So	Jacksonville HS	Jacksonville, Arkansas
G	5	Au'Diese Toney	6 ft 6 in (1.98 m)	205 lb (93 kg)	Sr	Trinity Christian School; Pittsburgh	Huntsville, Alabama
F	10	Jaylin Williams	6 ft 10 in (2.08 m)	240 lb (109 kg)	So	Northside HS	Fort Smith, Arkansas
G	11	Chris Lykes	5 ft 7 in (1.7 m)	160 lb (73 kg)	GS	Gonzaga College High School; Miami	Mitchellville, Maryland
G	13	Chance Moore	6 ft 5 in (1.96 m)	195 lb (88 kg)	Fr	McEachern High School	Brookhaven, Georgia
G	14	Jaxson Robinson	6 ft 6 in (1.98 m)	185 lb (84 kg)	So	Ada High School; Texas A&M	Ada, Oklahoma
F	20	Kamani Johnson	6 ft 7 in (2.01 m)	235 lb (107 kg)	RS Jr	Holy Spirit Preparatory School; UALR	Brooklyn, New York
G	21	Cade Arbogast	6 ft 3 in (1.91 m)	170 lb (77 kg)	RS So	De La Salle High School; Lane Community College	Concord, California
F	23	Connor Vanover	7 ft 3 in (2.21 m)	215 lb (98 kg)	RS Jr	Findlay Prep; California	Little Rock, Arkansas
F	45	Lawson Blake (W)	6 ft 10 in (2.08 m)	225 lb (102 kg)	Fr	Fayetteville High School; Link Year Prep	Fayetteville, Arkansas

Head coach

- Eric Musselman (San Diego)

Assistant coach(es)

- Keith Smart (Indiana)
- Clay Moser (UW–La Crosse)
- Gus Argenal (UC Davis)

Legend

- (C) Team captain
- (S) Suspended
- (I) Ineligible
- (W) Walk-on
- Injured
- Current redshirt

Roster
Last update: July 1, 2021

== Schedule and results ==
Arkansas played in the Hall of Fame Classic in Kansas City in November; they were scheduled to play against Kansas State and either Illinois or Cincinnati. The Razorbacks defeated Kansas State before beating Cincinnati in the Hall of Fame Classic championship game. On February 8, the Razorbacks set a new attendance record of 20,361 against top-ranked Auburn.

Date time, TV	Rank^{#}	Opponent^{#}	Result	Record	High points	High rebounds	High assists	Site (attendance) city, state
Exhibition
October 24, 2021*; 3:00 p.m.	No. 16	East Central	W 77–74	–	20 – Davis	15 – Toney	3 – Davis	Bud Walton Arena (19,200); Fayetteville, AR
October 30, 2021*; 4:00 p.m.	No. 16	North Texas	W 68–60	–	21 – Notae	5 – Umude	4 – K. Robinson	Bud Walton Arena (19,200); Fayetteville, AR
Regular season
November 9, 2021*; 7:00 p.m., SECN+	No. 16	Mercer	W 74–61	1–0	27 – Notae	8 – Toney	5 – Williams	Bud Walton Arena (19,200); Fayetteville, AR
November 13, 2021*; 2:00 p.m., SECN+	No. 16	Gardner–Webb	W 86–69	2–0	19 – Vanover	8 – Williams	6 – Davis	Bud Walton Arena (19,200); Fayetteville, AR
November 17, 2021*; 7:00 p.m., SECN+	No. 16	Northern Iowa	W 93–80	3–0	26 – Lykes	9 – Umude	9 – Notae	Bud Walton Arena (19,200); Fayetteville, AR
November 22, 2021*; 8:00 p.m., ESPNews	No. 13	vs. Kansas State; Hall of Fame Classic Semifinal	W 72–64	4–0	14 – Tied	9 – Toney	5 – Notae	T-Mobile Center; Kansas City, MO
November 23, 2021*; 8:30 p.m., ESPN2	No. 13	vs. Cincinnati; Hall of Fame Classic Championship	W 73–67	5–0	19 – Toney	11 – Williams	4 – Williams	T-Mobile Center; Kansas City, MO
November 28, 2021*; 3:00 p.m., SECN	No. 13	Penn	W 76–60	6–0	28 – Notae	9 – Tied	6 – Williams	Bud Walton Arena (19,200); Fayetteville, AR
December 1, 2021*; 7:00 p.m., SECN+	No. 10	Central Arkansas	W 97–60	7–0	17 – Umude	12 – Williams	7 – Notae	Bud Walton Arena (19,200); Fayetteville, AR
December 4, 2021*; 3:00 p.m., SECN+	No. 10	Little Rock	W 93–78	8–0	18 – Tied	8 – Toney	7 – Davis	Bud Walton Arena (19,200); Fayetteville, AR
December 7, 2021*; 8:00 p.m., SECN	No. 12	Charlotte	W 86–66	9–0	23 – Notae	10 – Notae	8 – Davis	Bud Walton Arena (19,200); Fayetteville, AR
December 11, 2021*; 12:30 p.m., ESPN2	No. 12	vs. Oklahoma; Tulsa Showcase	L 66–88	9–1	26 – Davis	7 – Williams	3 – Tied	BOK Center (12,746); Tulsa, OK
December 18, 2021*; 7:00 p.m.	No. 24	vs. Hofstra	L 81–89	9–2	20 – Notae	8 – Williams	4 – Davis	Simmons Bank Arena (14,685); North Little Rock, AR
December 21, 2021*; 6:00 p.m., SECN		Elon	W 81–55	10–2	21 – Lykes	7 – Notae, Johnson	6 – Davis	Bud Walton Arena (19,200); Fayetteville, AR
December 29, 2021; 4:00 p.m., SECN		at Mississippi State	L 68–81	10–3 (0–1)	19 – Umude	7 – Tied	6 – Williams	Humphrey Coliseum (6,628); Starkville, MS
January 4, 2022; 7:30 p.m., SECN		Vanderbilt	L 74–75	10–4 (0–2)	28 – Umude	10 – Williams	5 – Notae	Bud Walton Arena (19,200); Fayetteville, AR
January 8, 2022; 12:00 p.m., SECN		at Texas A&M	L 81–86	10–5 (0–3)	31 – Notae	11 – Williams	7 – Davis	Reed Arena (7,967); College Station, TX
January 12, 2022; 8:00 p.m., SECN		Missouri	W 87–43	11–5 (1–3)	19 – Notae	10 – Williams	4 – Davis	Bud Walton Arena (19,200); Fayetteville, AR
January 15, 2022; 1:00 p.m., ESPN2		at No. 12 LSU	W 65–58	12–5 (2–3)	19 – Notae	13 – Williams	4 – Notae	Pete Maravich Assembly Center (12,734); Baton Rouge, LA
January 18, 2022; 6:00 p.m., SECN		South Carolina	W 75–59	13–5 (3–3)	19 – Williams	9 – Williams	5 – Notae	Bud Walton Arena (19,200); Fayetteville, AR
January 22, 2022; 7:30 p.m., SECN		Texas A&M	W 76–73	14–5 (4–3)	17 – Notae	11 – Williams	4 – Notae	Bud Walton Arena (19,200); Fayetteville, AR
January 26, 2022; 6:00 p.m., SECN		at Ole Miss	W 64–55	15–5 (5–3)	25 – Notae	8 – Williams	5 – Tied	SJB Pavilion (6,642); Oxford, MS
January 29, 2022*; 1:00 p.m., ESPN2		vs. West Virginia; Big 12/SEC Challenge	W 77–68	16–5	19 – Toney	15 – Williams	3 – Tied	Bud Walton Arena (19,200); Fayetteville, AR
February 2, 2022; 6:00 p.m., ESPNU		at Georgia	W 99–73	17–5 (6–3)	31 – Umude	9 – Notae	7 – Lykes	Stegeman Coliseum (6,448); Athens, GA
February 5, 2022; 7:30 p.m., SECN		Mississippi State	W 63–55	18–5 (7–3)	14 – Notae	9 – Williams	4 – Notae	Bud Walton Arena (19,200); Fayetteville, AR
February 8, 2022; 6:00 p.m., ESPN2		No. 1 Auburn	W 80–76 ^{OT}	19–5 (8–3)	28 – Notae	11 – Williams	3 – Notae	Bud Walton Arena (20,361); Fayetteville, AR
February 12, 2022; 11:00 a.m., SECN		at Alabama	L 67–68	19–6 (8–4)	22 – Williams	10 – Williams	3 – Tied	Coleman Coliseum (10,353); Tuscaloosa, AL
February 15, 2022; 8:00 p.m., SECN	No. 23	at Missouri	W 76–57	20–6 (9–4)	23 – Umude	11 – Williams	4 – Notae	Mizzou Arena (7,448); Columbia, MO
February 19, 2022; 3:00 p.m., ESPN	No. 23	No. 16 Tennessee	W 58–48	21–6 (10–4)	13 – Tied	16 – Williams	2 – Tied	Bud Walton Arena (19,200); Fayetteville, AR
February 22, 2022; 6:00 p.m., ESPN2	No. 18	at Florida	W 82–74	22–6 (11–4)	20 – Notae	10 – Williams	4 – Davis	O'Connell Center (9,023); Gainesville, FL
February 26, 2022; 1:00 p.m., CBS	No. 18	No. 6 Kentucky	W 75–73	23–6 (12–4)	30 – Notae	12 – Williams	8 – Notae	Bud Walton Arena (19,200); Fayetteville, AR
March 2, 2022; 8:00 p.m., ESPN2	No. 14	LSU	W 77–76	24–6 (13–4)	23 – Umude	11 – Williams	5 – Notae	Bud Walton Arena (19,200); Fayetteville, AR
March 5, 2022; 11:00 a.m., ESPN	No. 14	at No. 13 Tennessee	L 74–78	24–7 (13–5)	20 – Notae	8 – Johnson	4 – Notae	Thompson–Boling Arena (21,678); Knoxville, TN
SEC Tournament
March 11, 2022; 1:30 p.m., ESPN	(4) No. 15	vs. (5) LSU; Quarterfinals	W 79–67	25–7	22 – Toney	11 – Williams	3 – Notae	Amalie Arena (16,094); Tampa, FL
March 12, 2022; 12:00 p.m., ESPN	(4) No. 15	vs. (8) Texas A&M; Semifinals	L 64–82	25–8	20 – Umude	9 – Williams	5 – Notae	Amalie Arena; Tampa, FL
NCAA Tournament
March 17, 2022; 8:20 p.m., TNT	(4 W) No. 17	vs. (13 W) Vermont; First Round	W 75–71	26–8	21 – Umude	9 – Tied	4 – Notae	KeyBank Center (16,194); Buffalo, NY
March 19, 2022; 7:40 p.m., TNT	(4 W) No. 17	vs. (12 W) New Mexico State; Second Round	W 53–48	27–8	18 – Notae	15 – Williams	3 – Tied	KeyBank Center (18,299); Buffalo, NY
March 24, 2022; 6:09 p.m., CBS	(4 W) No. 17	vs. (1 W) No. 1 Gonzaga; Sweet Sixteen	W 74–68	28–8	21 – Notae	12 – Williams	6 – Notae	Chase Center (17,514); San Francisco, CA
March 26, 2022; 7:49 p.m., TBS	(4 W) No. 17	vs. (2 W) No. 9 Duke; Elite Eight	L 69–78	28–9	17 – Williams	10 – Williams	4 – Notae	Chase Center (17,739); San Francisco, CA
*Non-conference game. ^{#}Rankings from AP Poll. (#) Tournament seedings in parentheses. W=West. All times are in Central Time.

=== Post-Season ===
Senior guard JD Notae was named to the AP and the Sporting News All-American teams as a third-team selection. Notae and sophomore forward Jaylin Williams were both named 1st Team All-SEC, and Williams was also placed on the SEC All-Defensive Team.

Notae and Williams were named to the NCAA Tournament West Regional Team.

Arkansas was the only SEC team to make it beyond the 2nd Round of the NCAA Tournament, earning a second consecutive Elite Eight appearance. Arkansas finished ranked in the final Coaches Poll at #8, marking the second year in a row they finished in the Top 10.

Notae and senior guard Au'Diese Toney declared for the NBA draft, while sophomore guard Khalen Robinson, freshman guard Chance Moore, and junior forward Connor Vanover elected to transfer.

== See also ==
- 2021–22 Arkansas Razorbacks women's basketball team
