= Dennis Smith Jr. =

American basketball player (born 1997)

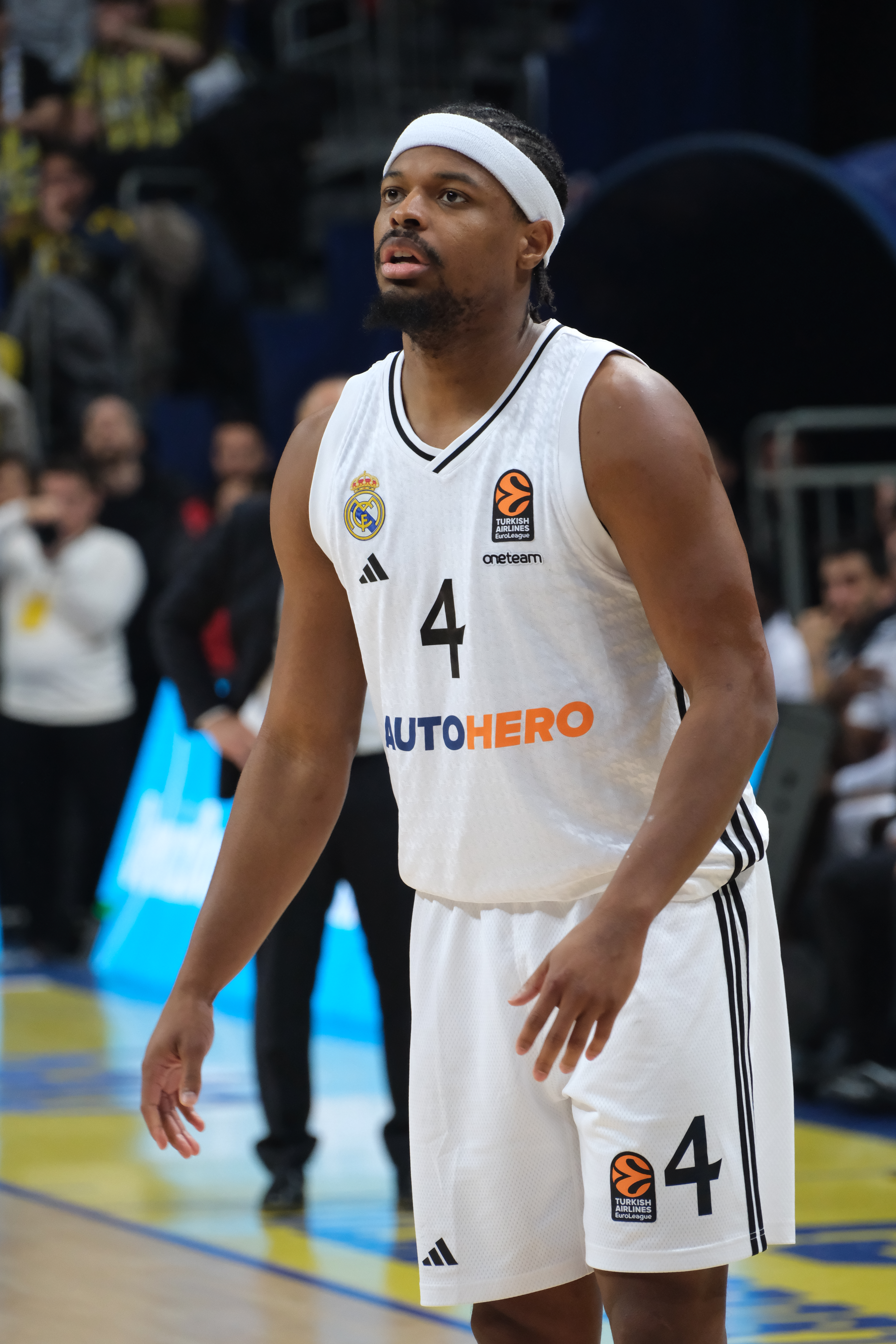
- Smith with Real Madrid in 2025

No. 26 – Sioux Falls Skyforce
- Position: Point guard
- League: NBA G League

Personal information
- Born: November 25, 1997 (age 28) Fayetteville, North Carolina, U.S.
- Listed height: 6 ft 2 in (1.88 m)
- Listed weight: 205 lb (93 kg)

Career information
- High school: Trinity Christian School (Fayetteville, North Carolina)
- College: NC State (2016–2017)
- NBA draft: 2017: 1st round, 9th overall pick
- Drafted by: Dallas Mavericks
- Playing career: 2017–present

Career history
- 2017–2019: Dallas Mavericks
- 2019–2021: New York Knicks
- 2021: Detroit Pistons
- 2021–2022: Portland Trail Blazers
- 2022–2023: Charlotte Hornets
- 2023–2024: Brooklyn Nets
- 2025: Real Madrid
- 2025–2026: Wisconsin Herd
- 2026–present: Sioux Falls Skyforce

Career highlights
- NBA All-Rookie Second Team (2018); ACC Rookie of the Year (2017); Second-team All-ACC (2017); ACC All-Freshman team (2017)
- Stats at NBA.com
- Stats at Basketball Reference

Dennis Cliff Smith Jr. (born November 25, 1997) is an American professional basketball player for the Sioux Falls Skyforce of the NBA G League. He played college basketball for the NC State Wolfpack and earned second-team all-conference honors in the Atlantic Coast Conference (ACC) as a freshman as well as ACC Rookie of the Year. Smith was selected ninth overall in the 2017 NBA draft by the Dallas Mavericks.

Smith spent two seasons in Dallas before being traded to the New York Knicks in January 2019. He was traded to the Detroit Pistons in February 2021 and later joined the Portland Trail Blazers as a free agent in September of the same year. He was waived by the Blazers in February 2022 after suffering a right elbow injury and signed with the Charlotte Hornets in the 2022 off-season. He signed with the Brooklyn Nets in July 2023.

== High school career ==
Smith attended Trinity Christian School in Fayetteville, North Carolina. During his first year at Trinity Christian in 2013, Smith came off the bench on the varsity basketball team, where he averaged 9.2 points and 3.0 assist per game. On December 28, 2013, Smith scored 41 points in an 82–73 win over Homeschool Christian Youth Association and future NBA player Justin Jackson. As a sophomore, Smith and Trinity Christian defeated Greenfield by one point to win the 2014 NCISAA 1-A State Championship; Smith scored 21 points and was named MVP. During the season, Smith averaged, 17.6 points per game and 9.3 assists, 6.9 rebounds and 2.4 steals per game. After the conclusion of his sophomore season, Smith participated in the NBPA Top 100 Camp on June 19, 2014, at John Paul Jones Arena in Virginia. Smith also competed in the 2014 Adidas Nations.

In his junior year, Smith and Trinity Christian played in the 2014–2015 High School OT Holiday Invitational Tournament at Broughton High School in Raleigh. On December 26, 2014, Smith scored 23 points to help Trinity defeat Ravenscroft School (83–60). On December 29, 2014, Smith went head to head with an Orangeville Prep that featured future NBA players Jamal Murray and Thon Maker. Smith scored 38 points in a losing effort as Trinity Christian lost (79–75) in the semi-finals. On January 15, 2015, he scored 25 points in a 65–54 victory over Dudley High School, and on February 2, 2015, he scored 17 points to defeat Cape Fear Christian Academy in the NCISAA 1-A quarterfinals. On February 11, 2015, in the last game of the season, Smith scored 33 points in a (90–58) loss to Word of God Christian Academy in the NCISAA 1-A Semi-finals. On the season, Smith averaged 22.2 points per game, 7.1 assists, 5.1 rebounds per game and 3 steals, while leading the Crusaders to a (23–10) overall record. In 2015, he was named the Gatorade Basketball Player of the Year for North Carolina. Smith received surgery weeks later after the injury. Before the injury, in the summer of 2015, Smith competed on the Adidas Uprising Circuit for the AAU team, Team Loaded North Carolina (NC), alongside future NBA player Bam Adebayo. He led his team to victory in the Adidas Uprising Gauntlet Championship. Smith averaged 16.2 points, 4.8 rebounds and 6.9 assists in 11 games on the circuit. On July 27, 2015, in a televised game on ESPNU, Smith recorded 29 points, 10 rebounds and 8 assists in a 78–77 win over Kyle Guy and Indiana Elite. On August 10, 2015, while competing in an Adidas Nations event, Smith tore his ACL, but did not feel any serious pain or swelling in his knee. During surgery, Smith's doctors found that he had an extra ACL. He was originally ruled out for his entire senior season of high school but in between two weeks and two months, he claimed that he had become more explosive, with his vertical increasing by 8 inches.

Smith was rated a five-star recruit and was considered one of the best players and point guards in the 2016 high school class. He was ranked No. 7 overall recruit by 247sports, while Scout.com ranked him No. 10 in the Class of 2016.

On September 10, 2015, Smith committed to North Carolina State University, picking NC State over Duke, Wake Forest, North Carolina and Kentucky to play college basketball.

College recruiting
Name	Hometown	School	Height	Weight	Commit date
Dennis Smith Jr; PG	Fayetteville, NC	Trinity Christian School (NC)	6 ft 2 in (1.88 m)	190 lb (86 kg)	Sep 10, 2015
Dennis Smith Jr; PG	Recruit ratings: Scout: Rivals: 247Sports: ESPN: (96)				
Overall recruit ranking: Scout: 10 Rivals: N/A 247Sports: 7 ESPN: N/A
Note: In many cases, Scout, Rivals, 247Sports, On3, and ESPN may conflict in their listings of height and weight.; In these cases, the average was taken. ESPN grades are on a 100-point scale.; Sources: "2016 Team Ranking". Rivals.

== College career ==
In December 2015, Smith decided to reclassify and graduate early from Trinity Christian School and in January 2016 he enrolled at North Carolina State University. He decided to take the opportunity to get an early start on his first year by attending classes and rehabbing from his injury with the NC State medical staff before the start of the 2016–17 season. Smith began his freshman season playing in two exhibition games against Lynn University and Barton College. In his debut for the Wolfpack, Smith played 36 minutes and dished out five assists in an 81–79 victory against Georgia Southern. On November 21, 2016, Smith recorded a then-career-high 24 points to go along with 8 assists, defeating Saint Joseph's University, 73–63, in the Paradise Jam tournament. On November 26, 2016, he scored a season-high 30 points, grabbed 6 rebounds and tallied 7 assists to help NC State defeat Loyola University Chicago. On December 15, 2016, Smith recorded 22 points and 6 assists, leading NC State in a win over Appalachian State. On December 19, 2016, Smith earned ACC Freshman of the Week honors.

On January 4, 2017, Smith recorded a triple-double—27 points, 11 rebounds and 11 assists—in a win against the Virginia Tech Hokies, making him and Julius Hodge the only two NC State players to achieve this feat. On January 23, 2017, Smith scored a new career high with 32 points and 6 assists in an 84–82 victory against the Duke Blue Devils, leading NC State to its first win at Cameron Indoor Stadium since 1995. Smith recorded his second triple-double—13 points, 15 assists and 11 rebounds—of the season on February 1 in a losing effort to Syracuse. He is the only player in ACC history to have recorded two triple-doubles against league opponents. On February 7, 2017, Smith earned his second ACC rookie of the week honor On February 21, 2017, Smith scored 18 points in a 71–69 win against Georgia Tech. On March 5, 2017, Smith was named ACC Rookie of the Year. Smith was additionally named to both Second team All-ACC and ACC All-Freshman teams. In 32 games for NC State in 2016–17, Smith averaged 18.1 points, 6.2 assists and 1.9 steals per game.

After his freshman season, Smith announced his intention to forgo his final three years of collegiate eligibility and enter the 2017 NBA draft. His illegal recruitment where he was paid by NC State coaches led to NCAA sanctions.

== Professional career ==
=== Dallas Mavericks (2017–2019) ===
Smith was selected with the ninth overall pick in the 2017 NBA draft by the Dallas Mavericks. On July 5, 2017, he signed his rookie contract. While Smith would be out of action during the 2017 NBA Summer League in Orlando, he would return to action just in time for the event in Las Vegas. During the six games he played with the Mavericks out in Las Vegas, Smith recorded 17.3 points, 4.8 rebounds, 4.2 assists and 2.2 steals per game in under 25.9 minutes of action, which earned him All-Summer League first-team honors.

On October 18, 2017, Smith made his debut in the Mavericks' season opener, a 117–111 loss to the Atlanta Hawks, where he scored 16 points and had 10 assists. On December 29, 2017, he recorded his first career triple-double with 21 points, 10 rebounds and 10 assists in a 128–120 win over the New Orleans Pelicans. He was 5 of 7 from three-point range and 8 of 12 overall from the field. At 20 years, 34 days, Smith became the sixth-youngest player in NBA history to have a triple-double, behind Lonzo Ball, Markelle Fultz, Luka Dončić and LeBron James. On May 22, 2018, he was named to the NBA All-Rookie Second Team.

On October 28, 2018, Smith scored 27 points, alongside three assists and two blocks, in a 113–104 loss to the Utah Jazz. On January 30, 2019, in his last game before being traded, Smith recorded his second career triple-double with 13 points, ten rebounds and a career-high 15 assists in a 114–90 win over the New York Knicks, the team he would get traded to.

=== New York Knicks (2019–2021) ===
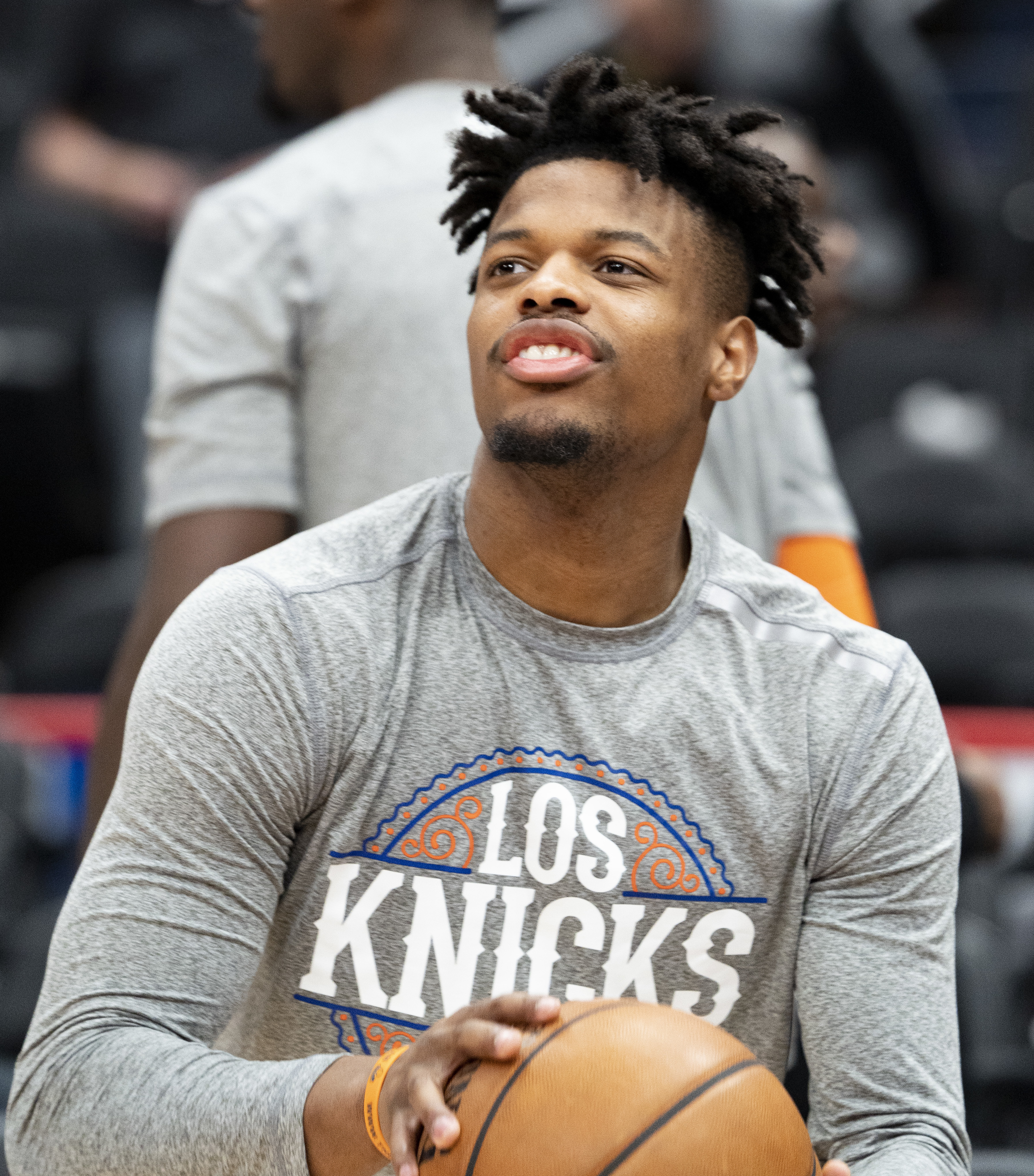
Smith with the New York Knicks in 2020

On January 31, 2019, Smith was traded to the New York Knicks along with DeAndre Jordan, Wesley Matthews and two future first-round draft picks in exchange for Kristaps Porziņģis, Tim Hardaway Jr., Trey Burke and Courtney Lee. Smith made his Knicks debut on February 3, recording eight points, three rebounds and six assists in a 96–84 loss to the Memphis Grizzlies. On February 8, in only his third game with the Knicks, he scored a career-high 31 points, alongside eight assists and two steals, in a 120–103 loss to the Detroit Pistons. On April 9, Smith recorded 25 points and five assists in a 96–86 win over the Chicago Bulls.

On December 1, 2019, Smith scored a season-high 17 points, alongside seven assists and two blocks, in a 113–104 loss to the Boston Celtics.

On February 1, 2021, Smith was assigned to the Westchester Knicks, the affiliate of New York in the NBA G League. He reportedly requested to be sent down to the team in order to get more playing time; however, he never played a game in the G League for the Knicks. During the 2020–21 season, Smith only played three games for the Knicks at the NBA level.

=== Detroit Pistons (2021) ===
On February 8, 2021, Smith was traded, alongside a future second-round pick, to the Detroit Pistons in exchange for Derrick Rose. Smith made his Pistons debut three days later, recording four points and two rebounds in a 111–95 loss to the Indiana Pacers. On February 26, he scored a season-high 17 points, alongside six assists, in a 110–107 loss to the Sacramento Kings. On March 3, Smith recorded his third career triple-double with ten points, eleven assists and a career-high twelve rebounds in a 129–105 win over the Toronto Raptors.

=== Portland Trail Blazers (2021–2022) ===
On September 23, 2021, Smith signed with the Portland Trail Blazers. He made his Trail Blazers debut on October 23, recording two points, two rebounds and five assists in a 134–105 win over the Phoenix Suns. On December 4, Smith scored a season-high 21 points, alongside four rebounds, six assists and three steals, in a 145–117 loss to the Boston Celtics. On February 16, 2022, he was diagnosed with a high-grade partial tear of the ulnar collateral ligament (UCL) in his right elbow, and was subsequently ruled out for three-to-four weeks. On February 21, Smith was waived by the Trail Blazers. He remained unsigned throughout the remainder of the 2021–22 season.

=== Charlotte Hornets (2022–2023) ===
After being waived by Portland, Smith considered attempting to sign with an NFL team as a defensive back rather than playing basketball overseas. However, Smith was invited to the Charlotte Hornets' preseason camp.

On September 23, 2022, Smith signed with his hometown team, the Charlotte Hornets. On October 19, he made his Hornets debut, recording 12 points, two rebounds, four assists, two blocks and two steals in a 129–102 win over the San Antonio Spurs. On October 23, Smith recorded 18 points and six assists in a 126–109 victory against the Atlanta Hawks.

=== Brooklyn Nets (2023–2024) ===
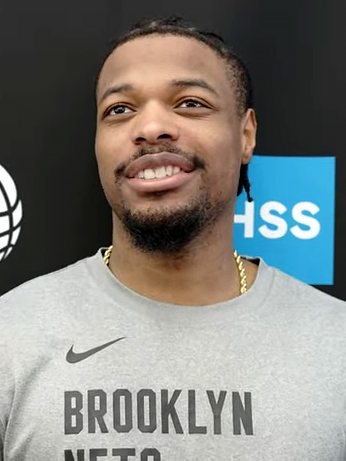
Smith with the Brooklyn Nets in 2024

On July 8, 2023, Smith signed with the Brooklyn Nets. Smith made 56 appearances (including two starts) for the Nets, recording averages of 6.6 points, 2.9 rebounds, and 3.6 assists.

=== Real Madrid (2025) ===
On December 20, 2024, Smith signed with the Wisconsin Herd of the NBA G League, but never appeared in a game for the Herd and on January 16, 2025, he signed with Real Madrid of the Spanish Liga ACB and the EuroLeague. On February 18, Smith parted ways with Real Madrid. He appeared in two Liga ACB games, averaging 1.5 points in 7.5 minutes, and two EuroLeague games where he averaged 4.0 points in 10.5 minutes.

=== Wisconsin Herd (2025–2026) ===
Smith returned to the Dallas Mavericks on September 26, 2025. He was waived prior to the start of the 2025–26 NBA season on October 17. On November 17, Smith signed with the Wisconsin Herd of the NBA G League.

=== Sioux Falls Skyforce (2026–present) ===
On January 22, 2026, Smith was acquired by the Sioux Falls Skyforce of the NBA G League from the available player pool.

== Personal life ==
On June 21, 2017, Smith signed a three-year endorsement deal with Under Armour.

Smith is friends with fellow Fayetteville native rapper J. Cole.

Smith was raised by a single-father, Dennis Smith Sr. with the help of his Aunt Rhonda. Smith has one son, born in 2022.

== Career statistics ==
Legend
GP	Games played	GS	Games started	MPG	Minutes per game
FG%	Field goal percentage	3P%	3-point field goal percentage	FT%	Free throw percentage
RPG	Rebounds per game	APG	Assists per game	SPG	Steals per game
BPG	Blocks per game	PPG	Points per game	**Bold**	Career high

=== NBA ===
Year	Team	GP	GS	MPG	FG%	3P%	FT%	RPG	APG	SPG	BPG	PPG
2017–18	Dallas	**69**	**69**	**29.7**	.395	.313	.694	**3.8**	5.2	1.0	.3	**15.2**
2018–19	Dallas	32	32	28.4	**.440**	.344	.695	3.0	4.3	1.3	.3	12.9
2018–19	New York	21	18	28.6	.413	.289	.568	2.8	**5.4**	1.3	.4	14.7
2019–20	New York	34	3	15.8	.341	.296	.509	2.3	2.9	.8	.2	5.5
2020–21	New York	3	0	9.2	.200	.000	**.833**	.7	1.0	1.0	.0	3.0
2020–21	Detroit	20	9	19.6	.415	**.352**	.700	2.7	3.7	1.0	**.7**	7.3
2021–22	Portland	37	4	17.3	.418	.222	.656	2.4	3.6	1.2	.3	5.6
2022–23	Charlotte	54	15	25.7	.412	.216	.736	3.1	4.8	**1.4**	.5	8.8
2023–24	Brooklyn	56	2	18.9	.435	.294	.741	2.9	3.6	1.2	.2	6.6
Career		326	152	23.3	.407	.298	.674	3.0	4.2	1.2	.3	9.7

=== EuroLeague ===
Year	Team	GP	GS	MPG	FG%	3P%	FT%	RPG	APG	SPG	BPG	PPG	PIR
2024–25	Real Madrid	2	1	10.2	.300	.000	1.000	1.5	0.5	.000	.000	4.0	0.5

=== College ===
Year	Team	GP	GS	MPG	FG%	3P%	FT%	RPG	APG	SPG	BPG	PPG
2016–17	NC State	32	32	34.8	.455	.359	.715	4.6	6.2	1.9	.4	18.1
