= 2021–22 Cincinnati Bearcats men's basketball team =

American college basketball season

2021–22 Cincinnati Bearcats men's basketball
- Conference: American Athletic Conference
- Record: 18–15 (7–11 American)
- Head coach: Wes Miller (1st season)
- Assistant coaches: Andre Morgan (1st season); Chad Dollar (1st season); Mike Roberts (1st season)
- Home arena: Fifth Third Arena

2021–22 American Athletic Conference men's basketball standings
	Conf.				Overall
Team	W		L	PCT	W		L	PCT
No. 15 Houston †	15	–	3	.833	32	–	6	.842
SMU	13	–	4	.765	24	–	9	.727
Memphis	13	–	5	.722	22	–	11	.667
Temple	10	–	7	.588	17	–	12	.586
Tulane	10	–	8	.556	14	–	15	.483
UCF	9	–	9	.500	18	–	12	.600
Wichita State	6	–	9	.400	15	–	13	.536
Cincinnati	7	–	11	.389	18	–	15	.545
East Carolina	6	–	11	.353	15	–	15	.500
Tulsa	4	–	14	.222	11	–	20	.355
South Florida	3	–	15	.167	8	–	23	.258
† 2022 AAC tournament winner Rankings from AP poll

The 2021–22 Cincinnati Bearcats men's basketball team represented the University of Cincinnati in the 2021–22 NCAA Division I men's basketball season. The Bearcats were led by first-year head coach Wes Miller. The team played their home games at Fifth Third Arena as members of the American Athletic Conference. They finished the season 18–15, 7–11 in AAC play to finish in seventh place.

== Previous season ==
In a season limited due to the ongoing COVID-19 pandemic, the Bearcats finished the 2019–20 season 12–11, 8–6 in AAC play to finish in fifth place. They defeated SMU and Wichita State in the AAC tournament before losing to Houston in the championship game. The season was the first time since 2010 that the Bearcats did not make the NCAA tournament.

On April 3, 2021, the school placed head coach John Brannen on paid leave pending an investigation after six Bearcats players decided to transfer following the season. A week later, the school fired Brannen following an investigation into his conduct. On April 14, the school named UNC Greensboro head coach Wes Miller the team's new head coach.

== Offseason ==
Two days after the conference tournament championship, the Bearcats saw six players enter the transfer portal. On March 26, Athletic Director John Cunningham announced the university would begin investigating allegations against the program. On April 3, it was announced that head coach John Brannen was placed on indefinite leave. On April 9, the school announced Brannen had been relieved of his duties effective immediately along with assistants Jayson Gee and Sean Dwyer. Tim Morris was announced as the interim head coach. In the next few days, both Mike Saunders Jr. and Mason Madsen withdrew from the transfer portal after Miller's hiring.

=== Departures ===
Cincinnati Departing Players
Name	Number	Pos.	Height	Weight	Year	Hometown	Notes (Note: Due to COVID-19 issues, the NCAA announced that the 2020–21 season would not be counted against the eligibility of any player in any sport held during the organization's winter season, including basketball. This meant that all players had the option to return for 2021–22.)
Zach Harvey	1	G	6'5"	195	Sophomore	Topeka, KS	Transferred to UCSB
Keith Williams	2	G	6'5"	215	Senior	Brooklyn, NY	Graduated; transferred to Western Kentucky
Tari Eason	13	F	6'8"	215	Freshman	Seattle, WA	Transferred to LSU
Mamoudou Diarra	20	F	6'9"	225	(redshirt) Junior	Bamako, Mali	Graduated; transferred to Tennessee Tech
Rapolas Ivanauskas	25	F	6'10"	235	Graduate Student	Barrington, IL	Left team (mid-season)
Chris Vogt	33	C	7'1"	260	Senior	Mayfield, KY	Graduated; transferred to Wisconsin
Adam Cook	44	F	6'6"	180	Senior	Marysville, OH	Walk–on; graduated
Gabe Madsen	55	G	6'5"	195	Freshman	Rochester, MN	Transferred to Utah

=== Incoming transfers ===
Cincinnati incoming transfers
Name	Number	Pos.	Height	Weight	Year	Hometown	Notes
Abdul Ado	00	F	6'11"	255	Graduate Student	Lagos, Nigeria	Transferred from Mississippi State after graduating. Will have one year of remaining eligibility.
A. J. McGinnis	2	G	6'3"	180	Sophomore	Huntsville, AL	Transferred from UNC Greensboro. Will have four years of remaining eligibility.
John Newman III	15	G	6'5"	205	Senior	Greensboro, NC	Transferred from Clemson. Will have two years of remaining eligibility.
Hayden Koval	25	C	7'1"	220	Graduate Student	Prosper, TX	Transferred from UNC Greensboro after graduating. Will have one year of remaining eligibility.
Jarrett Hensley	32	F	6'8"	205	Sophomore	Merriam, KS	Transferred from UNC Greensboro. Will have four years of remaining eligibility.
Ody Oguama	33	F	6'9"	225	Junior	Raleigh, NC	Transferred from Wake Forest. Will have three years of remaining eligibility.

=== Recruiting classes ===
==== 2021 recruiting class ====
There was no 2021 recruiting class.

==== 2022 recruiting class ====
College recruiting information (2020)
Name	Hometown	School	Height	Weight	Commit date
Sage Tolentino; C	Honolulu, HI	Hamilton High School (OH)	7 ft 0 in (2.13 m)	210 lb (95 kg)	Jul 15, 2021
Sage Tolentino; C	Recruit ratings: Rivals: 247Sports: ESPN: (80)				
Daniel Skillings; SG	Philadelphia, PA	Roman Catholic High School	6 ft 5 in (1.96 m)	180 lb (82 kg)	Sep 23, 2021
Daniel Skillings; SG	Recruit ratings: Rivals: 247Sports: ESPN: (82)				
Josh Reed; SF	Atlanta, GA	Pace Academy	6 ft 6 in (1.98 m)	195 lb (88 kg)	Oct 1, 2021
Josh Reed; SF	Recruit ratings: Rivals: 247Sports: ESPN: (79)				
Overall recruit ranking:
Note: In many cases, Scout, Rivals, 247Sports, On3, and ESPN may conflict in their listings of height and weight.; In these cases, the average was taken. ESPN grades are on a 100-point scale.; Sources: "Cincinnati 2022 Basketball Commitments". Rivals.; "2022 Cincinnati Bearcats Recruiting Class". ESPN.; "2022 Team Ranking". Rivals.

== Preseason ==
=== AAC preseason media poll ===
On October 13, The American released the preseason Poll and other preseason awards

Coaches Poll
Predicted finish	Team	Votes (1st place)
1	Houston	98 (8)
2	Memphis	92 (3)
3	SMU	77
4	Wichita State	76
5	UCF	66
6	Cincinnati	52
7	Tulsa	43
8	Temple	37
T-9	South Florida	25
T-9	Tulane	25
11	East Carolina	14

=== Preseason Awards ===
- AAC Preseason All-Conference Second Team - Jeremiah Davenport

== Roster ==
2021–22 Cincinnati Bearcats men's basketball team
Players
Coaches

Pos.	#	Name	Height	Weight	Year	Previous school	Hometown
F	00	Abdul Ado	6 ft 11 in (2.11 m)	255 lb (116 kg)	GS	Mississippi State	Lagos, Nigeria
G	2	A. J. McGinnis (injured)	6 ft 3 in (1.91 m)	180 lb (82 kg)	So	UNC Greensboro	Huntsville, Alabama
G	3	Mike Saunders Jr.	6 ft 0 in (1.83 m)	185 lb (84 kg)	So	Wasatch Academy	Indianapolis, Indiana
G	5	David DeJulius	6 ft 0 in (1.83 m)	190 lb (86 kg)	Sr	Michigan	Detroit, Michigan
G	11	CJ Anthony (W)	6 ft 0 in (1.83 m)	195 lb (88 kg)	Fr	Putnam Science Academy	Columbus, Ohio
G/F	15	John Newman III	6 ft 5 in (1.96 m)	205 lb (93 kg)	Sr	Clemson	Greensboro, North Carolina
G	23	Mika Adams-Woods	6 ft 3 in (1.91 m)	185 lb (84 kg)	Jr	New Hampton School	Syracuse, New York
G	24	Jeremiah Davenport	6 ft 7 in (2.01 m)	210 lb (95 kg)	Jr	Hargrave Military Academy	Cincinnati, Ohio
C	25	Hayden Koval	7 ft 1 in (2.16 m)	225 lb (102 kg)	GS	UNC Greensboro	Prosper, Texas
F	30	Viktor Lakhin	6 ft 11 in (2.11 m)	245 lb (111 kg)	RS Fr	CSKA–2	Anapa, Russia
G	31	Sam Martin (W)	5 ft 10 in (1.78 m)	175 lb (79 kg)	GS	Summit Country Day School	Cincinnati, Ohio
F	32	Jarrett Hensley	6 ft 8 in (2.03 m)	220 lb (100 kg)	So	UNC Greensboro	Merriam, Kansas
F	33	Ody Oguama	6 ft 9 in (2.06 m)	225 lb (102 kg)	Jr	Wake Forest	Raleigh, North Carolina
F	43	Rob Banks (injured)	6 ft 5 in (1.96 m)	210 lb (95 kg)	Jr	Gould Academy	Bracknell, England
G	45	Mason Madsen	6 ft 4 in (1.93 m)	200 lb (91 kg)	So	Mayo High School	Rochester, Minnesota

Head coach

- Wes Miller (North Carolina)

Assistant coach(es)

- Andre Morgan (North Georgia)
- Mike Roberts (Indiana)
- Chad Dollar (South Florida)

Legend

- (C) Team captain
- (S) Suspended
- (I) Ineligible
- (W) Walk-on
- Injured
- Current redshirt

Roster
Last update: July 15, 2021

== Schedule and results ==
The Bearcats game vs Texas Southern scheduled for December 18, 2021 was canceled due to COVID-19 issues within the Tigers program. The Bearcats replaced the Texas Southern game with a game against Division II Ashland.

Date time, TV	Rank^{#}	Opponent^{#}	Result	Record	High points	High rebounds	High assists	Site (attendance) city, state
Non-conference regular season
November 9, 2021*; 7:00 p.m., ESPN+		Evansville	W 65–43	1–0	11 – Davenport	8 – Davenport	7 – DeJulius	Fifth Third Arena (10,024); Cincinnati, OH
November 13, 2021*; 7:00 p.m., ESPN+		Georgia	W 73–68	2–0	11 – Tied	7 – Tied	5 – Adams-Woods	Fifth Third Arena (10,672); Cincinnati, OH
November 16, 2021*; 7:00 p.m., ESPN+		Alabama A&M	W 89–66	3–0	21 – DeJulius	8 – Oguama	5 – Tied	Fifth Third Arena (9,816); Cincinnati, OH
November 18, 2021*; 7:00 p.m., ESPN+		Presbyterian	W 79–45	4–0	16 – Davenport	6 – Adams-Woods	5 – Madsen	Fifth Third Arena (9,749); Cincinnati, OH
November 22, 2021*; 6:30 p.m., ESPNews		vs. No. 14 Illinois; Hall of Fame Classic semifinals	W 71–51	5–0	20 – Saunders	8 – Lakhin	2 – Tied	T-Mobile Center; Kansas City, MO
November 23, 2021*; 9:30 p.m., ESPN2		vs. No. 13 Arkansas; Hall of Fame Classic Championship	L 67–73	5–1	24 – DeJulius	10 – Oguama	5 – Saunders	T-Mobile Center; Kansas City, MO
November 27, 2021*; 2:00 p.m., ESPN+		Monmouth	L 59–61	5–2	13 – DeJulius	6 – Oguama	5 – Adams-Woods	Fifth Third Arena (8,262); Cincinnati, OH
December 1, 2021*; 7:00 p.m., ESPN+		at Miami (OH)	W 59–58	6–2	14 – Tied	11 – Ado	5 – Adams-Woods	Millett Hall (7,285); Oxford, OH
December 5, 2021*; 7:00 p.m., ESPN+		Bryant	W 73–58	7–2	16 – DeJulius	11 – Lakhin	4 – 2 tied	Fifth Third Arena (7,924); Cincinnati, OH
December 11, 2021*; 8:30 p.m., FS1		at Xavier; Crosstown Shootout	L 63–83	7–3	14 – Newman III	6 – Lakhin	5 – Saunders	Cintas Center (10,707); Cincinnati, OH
December 14, 2021*; 7:00 p.m., ESPN+		Florida A&M	W 77–50	8–3	16 – Davenport	8 – Tied	6 – Saunders	Fifth Third Arena (7,701); Cincinnati, OH
December 18, 2021*; 1:00 p.m., ESPN+		Ashland	W 71–57	9–3	24 – Dejulius	6 – Newman III	3 – Tied	Fifth Third Arena (7,622); Cincinnati, OH
December 21, 2021*; 7:00 p.m., ESPN+		Tennessee Tech	W 76–67	10–3	15 – Saunders	7 – Davenport	4 – Adams-Woods	Fifth Third Arena (10,028); Cincinnati, OH
AAC Regular Season
January 1, 2022; 7:00 p.m., ESPN+		Tulane	L 60–68	10–4 (0–1)	19 – Davenport	10 – Davenport	3 – Tied	Fifth Third Arena (7,922); Cincinnati, OH
January 6, 2022; 9:30 p.m., ESPN		SMU	W 77–60	11–4 (1–1)	22 – DeJulius	10 – Oguama	7 – Saunders Jr.	Fifth Third Arena (7,978); Cincinnati, OH
January 9, 2022; 3:30 p.m., ABC		at Memphis; Rivalry	L 80–87	11–5 (1–2)	21 – Davenport	6 – Davenport	6 – Adams-Woods	FedExForum (14,502); Memphis, TN
January 12, 2022; 7:00 p.m., ESPN+		East Carolina	W 79–71	12–5 (2–2)	22 – Davenport	6 – Tied	8 – Saunders Jr.	Fifth Third Arena (7,911); Cincinnati, OH
January 16, 2022; 1:00 p.m., ESPN		at Wichita State	W 61–57	13–5 (3–2)	18 – DeJulius	6 – Adams-Woods	3 – Davenport	Charles Koch Arena (8,439); Wichita, KS
January 20, 2022; 9:00 p.m., ESPNU		Tulsa	W 90–69	14–5 (4–2)	24 – Davenport	7 – Oguama	7 – Adams-Woods	Fifth Third Arena (9,033); Cincinnati, OH
January 25, 2022; 7:00 p.m., ESPNU		at Temple	L 58–61	14–6 (4–3)	15 – DeJulius	9 – Newman III	3 – Saunders Jr.	Liacouras Center (4,752); Philadelphia, PA
January 30, 2022; 12:00 p.m., ESPNU		at East Carolina	W 60–59	15–6 (5–3)	21 – Adams-Woods	6 – Ado	2 – Tied	Williams Arena (3,834); Greenville, NC
February 6, 2022; 6:00 p.m., ESPN2		No. 6 Houston	L 58–80	15–7 (5–4)	25 – DeJulius	5 – Oguama	4 – Saunders	Fifth Third Arena (11,742); Cincinnati, OH
February 9, 2022; 7:00 p.m., ESPN+		at South Florida	W 70–59	16–7 (6–4)	24 – DeJulius	8 – Ado	3 – Adams-Woods	Yuengling Center (2,011); Tampa, FL
February 12, 2022; 8:00 p.m., ESPN+		at Tulsa	L 77–83	16–8 (6–5)	23 – DeJulius	9 – Davenport	3 – DeJulius	Reynolds Center (3,405); Tulsa, OK
February 15, 2022; 7:00 p.m., ESPN+		Memphis; Previously scheduled for Feb. 3rd	L 74–81	16–9 (6–6)	20 – Davenport	11 – Davenport	4 – DeJulius	Fifth Third Arena (12,012); Cincinnati, OH
February 17, 2022; 7:00 p.m., ESPN2		Wichita State	W 85–76	17–9 (7–6)	17 – DeJulius	6 – Adams-Woods	6 – DeJulius	Fifth Third Arena (9,655); Cincinnati, OH
February 20, 2022; 2:00 p.m., ESPN2		Temple	L 71–75	17–10 (7–7)	24 – Davenport	6 – Newman III	5 – Adams-Woods	Fifth Third Arena (9,122); Cincinnati, OH
February 23, 2022; 9:00 p.m., ESPNU		at UCF	L 61–75	17–11 (7–8)	16 – DeJulius	12 – Davenport	4 – Newman III	Addition Financial Arena (5,102); Orlando, FL
February 26, 2022; 7:00 p.m., ESPN+		South Florida	L 54–56	17–12 (7–9)	11 – Newman III	8 – Newman III	4 – DeJulius	Fifth Third Arena; Cincinnati, OH
March 1, 2022; 9:00 p.m., ESPNU		at No. 14 Houston; Previously scheduled for Dec. 28th	L 53–71	17–13 (7–10)	14 – Saunders	7 – Newman III	4 – DeJulius	Fertitta Center (7,598); Houston, TX
March 3, 2022; 7:00 p.m., ESPNU		at SMU	L 71–76	17–14 (7–11)	21 – DeJulius	7 – Davenport	4 – DeJulius	Moody Coliseum (4,261); University Park, TX
AAC Tournament
March 10, 2022; 1:00 p.m., ESPNU	(8)	vs. (9) East Carolina; First round	W 74–63	18–14	22 – DeJulius	8 – Newman III	5 – Newman III	Dickies Arena; Fort Worth, TX
March 11, 2022; 1:00 p.m., ESPN2	(8)	vs. (1) No. 18 Houston; Quarterfinals	L 56–69	18–15	13 – Tied	5 – Tied	4 – Tied	Dickies Arena; Fort Worth, TX
*Non-conference game. ^{#}Rankings from AP Poll. (#) Tournament seedings in parentheses. All times are in Eastern Time.

== Awards and honors ==
=== American Athletic Conference honors ===
==== All-AAC Third Team ====
- David DeJulius
