= John Knox (meteorologist) =

American meteorologist and academic

John A. Knox is a meteorologist who researches clear-air turbulence (CAT) and who also received media attention for discussing ways of calculating the mathematical constant e, together with inventor Harlan J. Brothers. He is a professor at the University of Georgia and has been nationally honored for his undergraduate teaching.

== Early life ==
Knox grew up in Birmingham, Alabama, where as a high-school senior at Huffman High School he was honored as a U.S. Presidential Scholar. He went to college at the University of Alabama at Birmingham (UAB). He was recruited to UAB as a member of the inaugural class of the UAB Honors Program, now the University Honors Program, and served on its Honors Council for three years. He was UAB's first national finalist in the Rhodes Scholar competition and later served as an ex officio member of the UAB Rhodes Committee, assisting UAB Rhodes candidates up to and including UAB's first winner, Neel Varshney, in 2000. As a graduating senior at UAB in 1988, Knox won both a National Science Foundation Graduate Research Fellowship and a Phi Kappa Phi Fellowship, and was a national finalist for the Omicron Delta Kappa National Leader of the Year Award.

== Scientific career ==
Knox received his Ph.D. in atmospheric sciences from the University of Wisconsin-Madison. He was a post-doctoral fellow at NASA Goddard Institute for Space Studies, and taught meteorology at Valparaiso University in Indiana before moving to the University of Georgia in 2001.

In 1997, inventor Harlan Brothers sent some college-level expression for e to National Public Radio's program Science Friday. Knox's wife Pam, an intern at Science Friday during Knox's post-doc at NASA/GISS, told them to Knox, who confirmed them. Together, they derived several formulae to calculate e. The formulae involve applying Bernoulli's standard result that (1 + 1/n)^{n} approximates e when n becomes large, to the formula $\scriptstyle e \, \equiv \, e^{1/2}/e^{-1/2}$, which is the basis of the popular bilinear transform.

Since 1995 Knox has performed research on clear-air turbulence (CAT), in particular CAT forecasting. In 2008, he co-authored (with Don McCann, and Paul Williams of the University of Reading) an article in the Journal of the Atmospheric Sciences describing a new method of CAT forecasting that received international media attention. In 2010, Knox was honored by the National Weather Association with the T. Theodore Fujita Research Achievement Award for his CAT forecasting research.

Knox writes popular articles and books about meteorology, including the award-winning Meteorology: Understanding the Atmosphere with Steven A. Ackerman of the University of Wisconsin-Madison.

Knox is currently a Professor of Atmospheric Sciences in the Geography Department at the University of Georgia and since 2004 the Undergraduate Coordinator for its Atmospheric Sciences Program. Since 2011 Knox has served as Faculty Advisor for the Demosthenian Literary Society, UGA's oldest student organization (founded in 1803).

== Political career ==
In February 2016 Knox announced his candidacy for a seat on the Athens-Clarke County Board of Education. Having lived in the district for 15 years, Knox was motivated to run by a desire to give back to the community and stand up for public schools. Knox has always believed that the "students come first". Knox represented District 8 on the Board of Education.

== Honors and awards ==
In April 2012 Knox was the only geography professor in the nation, and one of only two atmospheric scientists, included in The Princeton Review's first-ever "Best 300 Professors" list and book.

In November 2014 Knox was honored as the Georgia Professor of the Year by the organizations CASE and the Carnegie Foundation for the Advancement of Teaching in the US Professors of the Year ceremony at the National Press Club in Washington, DC. He was the first UGA professor named the state's Professor of the Year in a decade, and the first atmospheric sciences professor to be so named for any state in a quarter century.

In January 2015 Knox was extended an invitation to join the organization Faculty Row, a private global network of accomplished academics, as one of its approximately 1,600 "Super Professors" worldwide.
