= Al Pinkins =

American basketball coach (born 1972)

Current position
- Title: Assistant coach
- Team: Ole Miss
- Conference: SEC

Biographical details
- Born: December 8, 1972 (age 53)

Playing career
- 1993–1995: Chipola
- 1995–1998: NC State

Coaching career (HC unless noted)
- 2003–2011: Middle Tennessee (assistant)
- 2011–2014: Ole Miss (assistant)
- 2014–2015: Tennessee (assistant)
- 2015–2016: LSU (assistant)
- 2016–2018: Texas Tech (assistant)
- 2018–2022: Florida (associate HC)
- 2022: Florida (interim HC)
- 2022–2023: Texas Tech (assistant)
- 2023–present: Ole Miss (assistant)

Head coaching record
- Overall: 1–1 (.500)

Leroy Al Pinkins (born December 8, 1972) is an American college basketball coach and former player who is currently an assistant coach for the Ole Miss Rebels men's basketball team. Pinkins was previously an assistant coach for the Texas Tech Red Raiders basketball team.

== High school and college career ==
Pinkins attended Mitchell-Baker High School in his hometown of Camilla, Georgia, where he played football, basketball, and baseball. In 1989, Pinkins became the first Georgia high schooler to throw for over 3,000 yards in a season en route to leading Mitchell-Baker to a state championship that season. Pinkins would finish his high school football career as the then-all-time leader in career passing yards and touchdowns in the state of Georgia. In the 1989–90 season for basketball, Pinkins was named the Class AA player of the year and led Mitchell-Baker to a state championship that year. Pinkins averaged 21 points per game the following year and helped Mitchell-Baker repeat as state champions. Additionally, in his senior season on the baseball team, Pinkins registered a .465 batting average with 7 home runs and 43 RBIs, leading to Pinkins being awarded all-state honors.

Pinkins first attended Chipola College, where he played college basketball. He later transferred to NC State, where he would continue playing basketball.

== Coaching career ==
After a professional basketball career that included stints in the USBL and IBA along with playing internationally in Spain, China, and Qatar, Pinkins began his collegiate coaching career in 2003 as an assistant for Middle Tennessee. Pinkins joined Ole Miss as an assistant coach in 2011. Before the 2014–2015 season, Pinkins became an assistant coach for Tennessee. Pinkins joined LSU as an assistant coach the following year. Pinkins again left after one year to join Chris Beard's staff at Texas Tech in 2016. In 2018, Pinkins became the associate head coach for Florida. After head coach Mike White left Florida to become the head coach for Georgia, Pinkins was named the interim head coach for Florida, leading the team through the 2022 NIT. Following the season, Pinkins rejoined Texas Tech under Mark Adams, with whom he worked when both were assistant coaches during Pinkins' prior stint with Texas Tech. Pinkins left Texas Tech to rejoin Ole Miss as an assistant coach, following Chris Beard when he was hired as head coach.

== Head coaching record ==
Record table
Season	Team	Overall	Conference	Standing	Postseason
Florida (Southeastern Conference) (2022)
2021–22	Florida	1–1	0–0		NIT second round
Florida:		1–1 (.500)	0–0 (–)		
Total:		1–1 (.500)			
National champion Postseason invitational champion Conference regular season champion Conference regular season and conference tournament champion Division regular season champion Division regular season and conference tournament champion Conference tournament champion

== Personal life ==
Pinkins is married to his wife, Kara, and has three sons: Patton, Pryce, and Penn. Patton was a four-star shooting guard coming out of high school, and currently plays under his father at Ole Miss.
