= Chris Lykes =

American basketball player (born 1998)

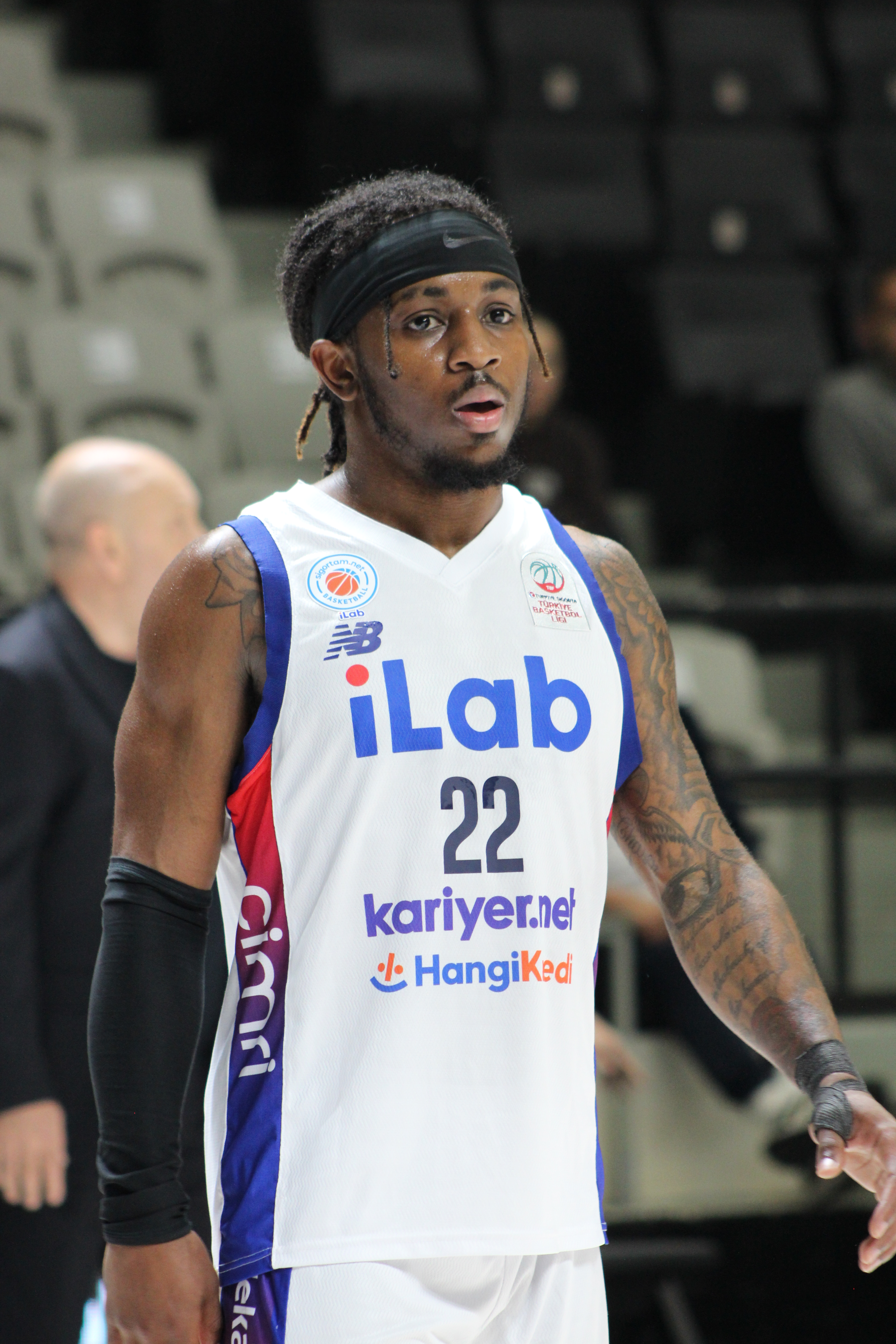
- Lykes with iLab Basketbol in 2024

No. 22 – Fribourg Olympic
- Position: Point guard
- League: Swiss Basketball League

Personal information
- Born: July 22, 1998 (age 28) Mitchellville, Maryland, U.S.
- Listed height: 5 ft 7 in (1.70 m)
- Listed weight: 160 lb (73 kg)

Career information
- High school: Gonzaga College (Washington, D.C.)
- College: Miami (Florida) (2017–2021); Arkansas (2021–2022)
- NBA draft: 2022: undrafted
- Playing career: 2022–present

Career history
- 2022–2023: Horsens IC
- 2023–2024: Denain Voltaire Basket
- 2024–2025: iLab Basketbol
- 2025–2026: Spirou Charleroi
- 2026–present: Fribourg Olmypic

Christopher Lykes (born July 22, 1998) is an American professional basketball player for Fribourg Olympic of the Swiss Basketball League. He played college basketball for the Miami Hurricanes and Arkansas Razorbacks.

== Early life ==
Lykes began playing basketball in second grade and competed for Gonzaga College High School in Washington, D.C. He was a starter since his freshman season, despite standing only 5 ft 6 in (1.68 m). As a sophomore, he helped his team win the Washington Catholic Athletic Conference (WCAC) championship over top recruit Markelle Fultz and DeMatha Catholic High School. In his junior season, Lykes averaged 22 points and 4.3 assists per game and was named WCAC player of the year and D.C. Gatorade Player of the Year.

As a senior, he averaged 17.6 points and 4.2 assists, repeating as WCAC player of the year. On February 16, 2017, Lykes became his school's all-time leading scorer, passing Tom Sluby. He finished his career with 2,266 points. Lykes helped Gonzaga win a postseason triple crown, with WCAC, District of Columbia State Athletic Association (DCSAA) and Alhambra Catholic Invitational titles. He was a four-star recruit and the No. 48 player in the 2017 class, according to ESPN. Lykes committed to playing college basketball for Miami (Florida) over offers from Villanova, among other NCAA Division I programs. He was drawn to Miami due to the success of fellow undersized guards Shane Larkin and Ángel Rodríguez with the program.

== College career ==
As a freshman, Lykes averaged 9.6 points and 2.3 assists per game. He developed a close friendship with teammate Lonnie Walker IV. During his sophomore season, Miami coach Jim Larrañaga called him "crazy, but he's also crazy good" for his tendency to make risky plays that usually turn out well. Lykes scored a career-high 28 points on January 3, 2019, in a 87–82 loss to NC State. Lykes scored 20 points in a loss to North Carolina on January 19, and tied a season-high with four three-pointers. Lykes averaged 16.2 points, 2.7 rebounds and 3.2 assists per game as a sophomore. He was named to the Atlantic Coast Conference (ACC) All-Academic Team for the second straight season.

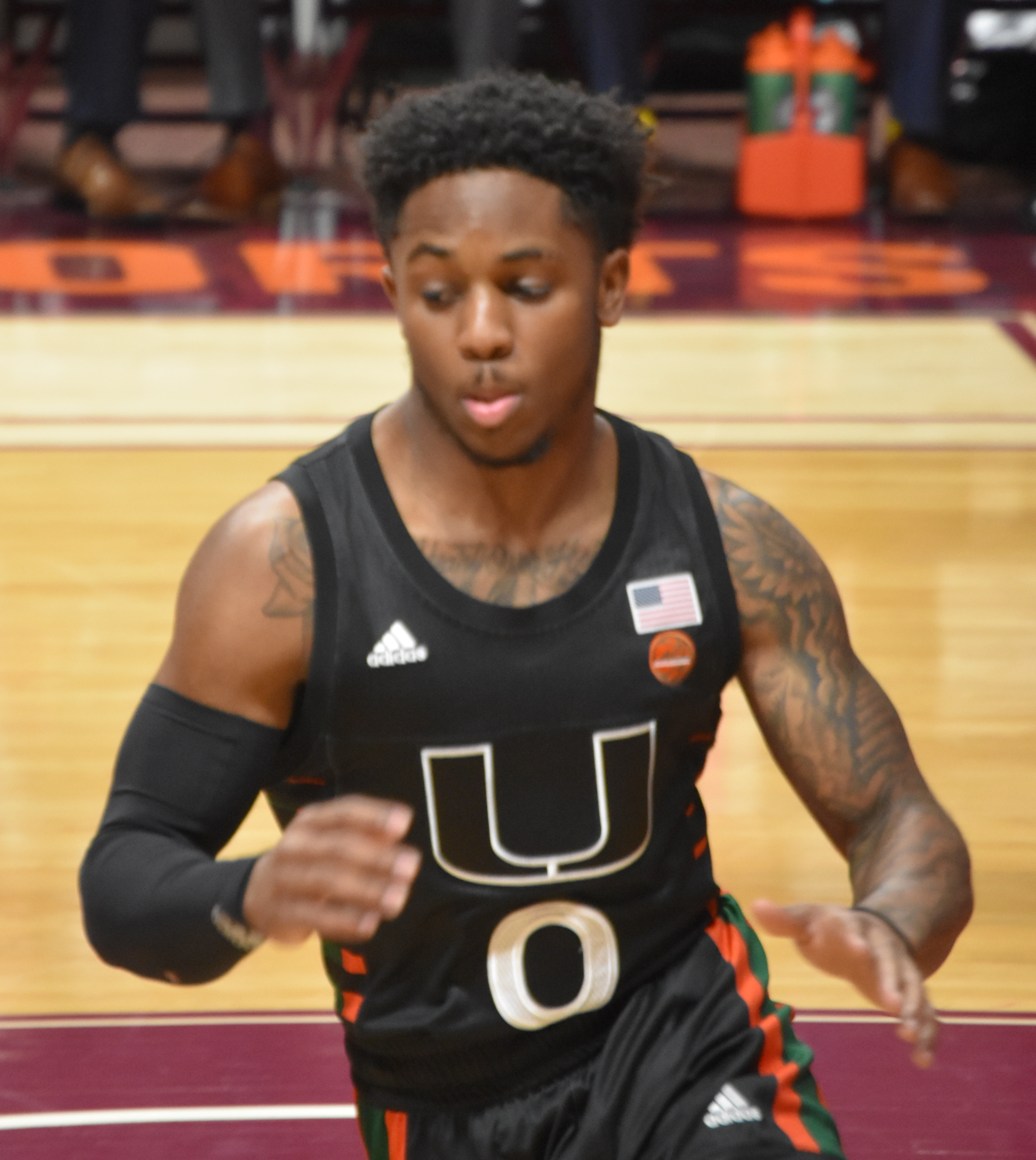
Lykes with Miami (Florida) in 2020

Coming into his junior season, Lykes was named Preseason Second Team All-ACC. Lykes missed four games in January 2020 with a groin injury. He sat out a game against Syracuse on March 8 with a laceration near his eye. As a junior, Lykes averaged 15.4 points, 2.4 assists, and 2.1 rebounds per game. Lykes was named All-ACC Honorable Mention. Two games into his senior season, he suffered a season-ending ankle injury. Lykes transferred to Arkansas for his final year of eligibility, choosing the Razorbacks over USC. He averaged 7.6 points, 1.5 assists and 1 rebound per game.

== Professional career ==
After going undrafted in the 2022 NBA draft, Lykes signed with Horsens IC of the top league in Denmark, Basketligaen. He averaged 22.0 points, 4.8 assists and 3.1 rebounds per game over 26 games, leading his team to an overall 17-9 record.

On June 27, 2023, Lykes signed with Denain Voltaire of the 2nd Division French League, LNB Pro B. He averaged 13.1 points, 2.1 rebounds, and 3.3 assists per game. Lykes left the team on February 21, 2024. He subsequently joined iLab Basketbol of the Turkish league and averaged 21.9 points, 2.9 rebounds, 5.6 assists and 1.2 steals per game.

On January 3, 2025, he signed with Spirou Basket of the BNXT League. He renewed his contract with the team on July 5, 2025, signing a new one-year deal. Lykes was cut from the team on December 18.

== Career statistics ==
Legend
| GP | Games played | GS | Games started | MPG | Minutes per game |
| FG% | Field goal percentage | 3P% | 3-point field goal percentage | FT% | Free throw percentage |
| RPG | Rebounds per game | APG | Assists per game | SPG | Steals per game |
| BPG | Blocks per game | PPG | Points per game | **Bold** | Career high |

=== College ===
| Year | Team | GP | GS | MPG | FG% | 3P% | FT% | RPG | APG | SPG | BPG | PPG |
|---|---|---|---|---|---|---|---|---|---|---|---|---|
| 2017–18 | Miami | 32 | 10 | 21.6 | .402 | .345 | .720 | 1.2 | 2.3 | .8 | .0 | 9.6 |
| 2018–19 | Miami | 32 | **32** | **33.8** | .406 | .318 | .781 | 2.7 | 3.2 | 1.3 | .0 | **16.2** |
| 2019–20 | Miami | 26 | 24 | 30.1 | **.432** | .381 | .814 | 2.1 | 2.4 | 1.1 | .3 | 15.4 |
| 2020–21 | Miami | 2 | 2 | 28.5 | .364 | **.455** | **.909** | **4.0** | **5.5** | **2.0** | **.5** | 15.5 |
| 2021–22 | Arkansas | **37** | 2 | 17.3 | .344 | .281 | .875 | 1.0 | 1.5 | .9 | .0 | 7.6 |
| Career | | 129 | 70 | 25.2 | .401 | .336 | .806 | 1.7 | 2.4 | 1.0 | .1 | 11.9 |
