= Myreon Jones =

American basketball player (born 2000)

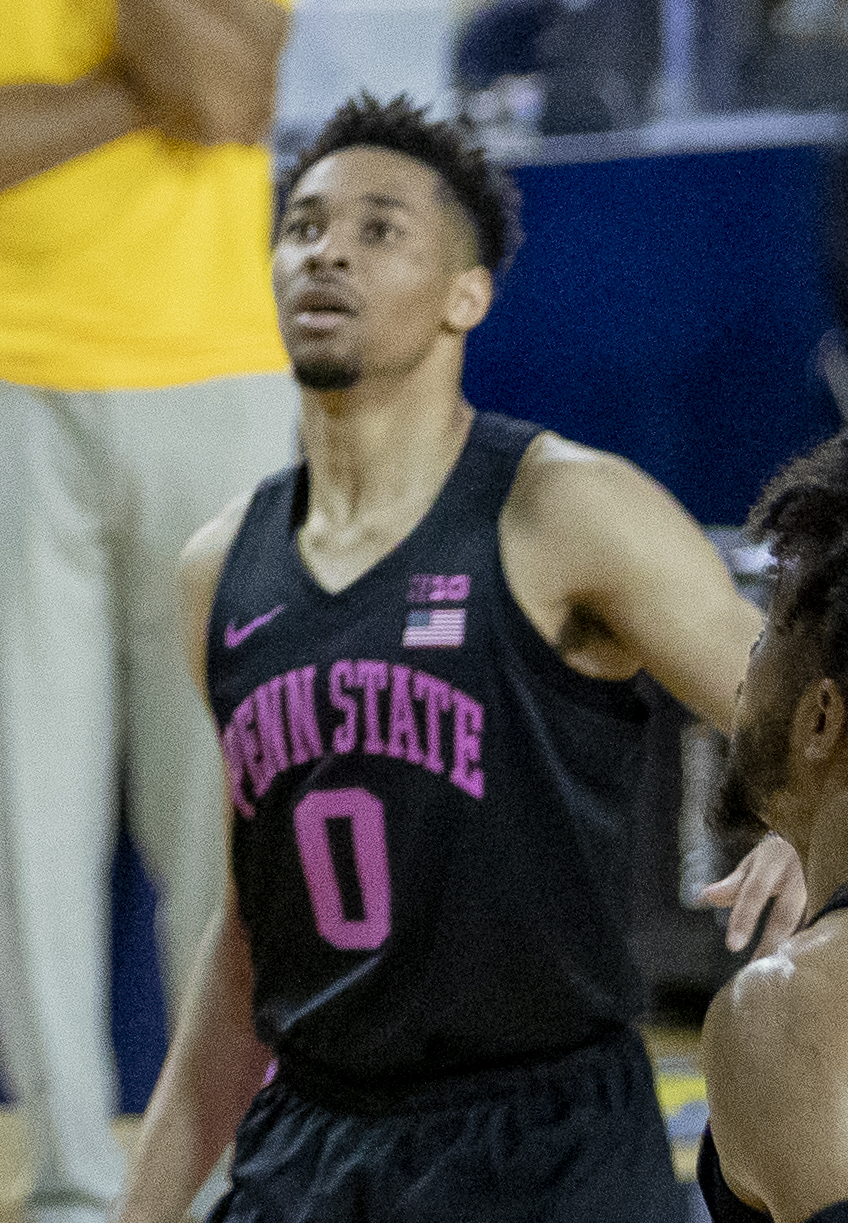
- Jones with Penn State in 2020

Free Agent
- Position: Point guard / shooting guard

Personal information
- Born: March 17, 2000 (age 26) Birmingham, Alabama, U.S.
- Listed height: 6 ft 3 in (1.91 m)
- Listed weight: 175 lb (79 kg)

Career information
- High school: Huffman (Birmingham, Alabama); Lincoln Academy (Suwanee, Georgia)
- College: Penn State (2018–2021); Florida (2021–2023)
- NBA draft: 2023: undrafted
- Playing career: 2023–present

Career history
- 2023–2025: Vëllaznimi
- 2025–2026: VfL AstroStars Bochum

Myreon Lamar Jones Jr. (born March 17, 2000) is an American professional basketball player who last played for VfL AstroStars Bochum of the ProA. He played college basketball for the Penn State Nittany Lions and Florida Gators.

== High school career ==
Jones played basketball for Huffman High School in Birmingham, Alabama. He averaged 21.1 points, 8.1 rebounds, and 2.0 assists per game as a junior. For his senior season, he transferred to Lincoln Academy in Suwanee, Georgia. Jones competed for the Georgia Stars on the Amateur Athletic Union circuit. He averaged 19 points per game as a senior, leading his team to a 25–9 record. Jones was ranked the 81st best prospect in his class by 247Sports and was considered to be a four-star prospect. He originally committed to playing college basketball for Memphis but decommitted after head coach Tubby Smith was fired. Jones later announced his commitment to Penn State.

== College career ==
On November 7, 2018, Jones scored a freshman season-high 18 points in a 63–62 win over Virginia Tech. As a freshman, he averaged four points per game off the bench. Jones missed close to four weeks of his sophomore season with an undisclosed illness. As a sophomore, he averaged 13.3 points, three assists, 2.7 rebounds and 1.3 steals per game, earning All-Big Ten honorable mention from the media. On February 23, 2021, he scored a junior season-high 29 points in an 86–83 victory against Nebraska. Jones averaged 15.3 points, 2.7 rebounds, two assists and 1.3 steals per game as a junior, and repeated on the All-Big Ten honorable mention. Following the season, he transferred to Florida.

== Professional career ==
After playing for KB Vëllaznimi of the Kosovo Basketball Superleague for two seasons, he joined the VfL AstroStars Bochum of the German second tier ProA for the 2024/25 season.

On July 12, 2025, he signed with VfL AstroStars Bochum of the ProA.

== Career statistics ==
Legend
GP	Games played	GS	Games started	MPG	Minutes per game
FG%	Field goal percentage	3P%	3-point field goal percentage	FT%	Free throw percentage
RPG	Rebounds per game	APG	Assists per game	SPG	Steals per game
BPG	Blocks per game	PPG	Points per game	**Bold**	Career high

=== College ===
Year	Team	GP	GS	MPG	FG%	3P%	FT%	RPG	APG	SPG	BPG	PPG
2018–19	Penn State	30	0	10.8	.298	.277	.774	1.0	.5	.5	.0	4.0
2019–20	Penn State	25	**24**	28.6	**.444**	**.403**	.776	2.7	**3.0**	**1.3**	**.2**	13.3
2020–21	Penn State	25	**24**	**30.3**	.394	.395	.773	2.7	2.0	**1.3**	.1	**15.3**
2021–22	Florida	**33**	21	27.9	.355	.321	.738	2.8	1.6	**1.3**	**.2**	8.5
2022–23	Florida	**33**	16	21.8	.352	.320	**.784**	**3.3**	2.1	1.0	.1	5.4
Career		146	85	23.5	.380	.351	.769	2.5	1.8	1.1	.1	8.8

== Personal life ==
Jones is the son of Myreon Sr. and Tammi Jones. In May 2020, he co-founded a podcast called "The Midnight Domino Show" with his Penn State teammate, John Harrar.
