= Huffman High School =

Location
- 950 Springville Road; Birmingham, Alabama 35215; United States; 33°36′41″N 86°40′59″W

Information
- Type: Public
- Established: 1966 (60 years ago)
- School district: Birmingham City Schools
- CEEB code: 010366
- Principal: Rueben Nelson
- Faculty: 60.00 (on an FTE basis)
- Grades: 9–12
- Enrollment: 1,123 (2023–2024)
- Student to teacher ratio: 18.72
- Colors: Orange and green
- Nickname: Vikings
- Website: www.bhamcityschools.org/o/hhs

Huffman High School (HHS) is a four-year public high school in Birmingham, Alabama. It is the largest of seven high schools in the Birmingham City School System and is a magnet school open to students from across the district. School colors are green and orange, and the mascot is the Viking. HHS competes in AHSAA Class 6A athletics.

== Student profile ==
Enrollment in grades 9-12 for the 2013-14 school year is 1,271 students. Approximately 96% of students are African-American, 2% are Hispanic, 1% are white, and 1% are multiracial. Roughly 72% of students qualify for free or reduced price lunch.

HHS has a graduation rate of 90%. Approximately 71% of its students meet or exceed proficiency standards in both mathematics and reading. The average ACT score for HHS students is 19, and the average SAT score is 940.

== History ==
On March 6, 2018, a student died and one other was injured when a gun went off in a negligent manner.

== Campus ==
HHS moved into its current facility in 2012. The campus consists of a 280,000 square foot, two-story building that includes classrooms and offices, a career/technical wing, culinary arts classrooms with a full commercial kitchen, and construction tech labs. There is a 1,600-seat performance gymnasium and practice gymnasium, as well as an outdoor theater and courtyard. Adjacent to the school is a 16-acre athletics complex that includes a football stadium, baseball and softball fields, and an athletic facility with locker rooms, a weight room, and coaches' offices.

Prior to the construction of its new campus, HHS had occupied the same building since its founding in 1966. The new construction was designed by Charles Williams & Associates architects and cost $54 million. It was built on the site of the former East Town Shopping Center adjacent to the older campus, which was then demolished to make space for the new athletics complex.

== Academy of Architecture & Construction ==
HHS houses the Birmingham City Schools' Academy of Architecture and Construction, an industry-based curriculum based on the National Academy Foundation (NAF) program.

Students choose one of three pathways: Design and Preconstruction, Construction, or Maintenance and Operations. Coursework can lead to careers in drafting design; welding; electrical technology; heating, ventilation, air-conditioning, and refrigeration (HVACR); carpentry; cabinetmaking; masonry; plumbing; and pipefitting. Course content includes significant technical depth and incorporates engineering concepts and terminology.

== Athletics ==
HHS competes in AHSAA Class 6A athletics and fields teams in the following sports:

- Baseball
- Basketball (boys and girls)
- Cheerleading
- Football
- Indoor track & field (boys and girls)
- Outdoor track & field (boys and girls)
- Softball
- Volleyball

Huffman High won the state 4A championship in baseball in 1977 and 1982 under the guidance of Coach Phil English whose career record was (566-217). Huffman High won the state 6A Championship in (Boys) Basketball in 2020 and we're the runner up in 2022 under the leadership of Steve Ward. Huffman High is the 2023 state 6A Runner-Up in (Girl) Basketball under the leadership of Lin Slater making her the first coach to ever make a state championship game in girls athletics at Huffman. Huffman High Football is led under Rodney Bivens Jr. Huffman Volleyball team is led under Blessing Dunn.

== Notable alumni ==
- Britt Burns, former MLB player (Chicago White Sox)
- Marcell Dareus, NFL defensive lineman (Jacksonville Jaguars)
- Philip Doyle, former NFL placekicker
- Makhi Hughes (2022), running back for the Tulane Green Wave
- Myreon Jones, professional basketball player
- John Knox, meteorologist
- Bill Latham, former MLB player (New York Mets, Minnesota Twins)
- James Manley, football player
- Stanley Robinson, professional basketball player
- Andre Smith NFL offensive lineman (Cincinnati Bengals)
- Ruben Studdard, R&B and gospel singer, winner of second season of American Idol
- Jay Tibbs, former MLB player (Cincinnati Reds, Montreal Expos, Baltimore Orioles, Pittsburgh Pirates)
