= 2021–22 Florida Gators men's basketball team =

American college basketball season

2021–22 Florida Gators men's basketball

Fort Myers Tip-Off champions

NIT, Second Round
- Conference: Southeastern Conference
- Record: 20–14 (9–9 SEC)
- Head coach: Mike White (7th season); Al Pinkins (interim)
- Associate head coach: Al Pinkins
- Assistant coaches: Erik Pastrana; Akeem Miskdeen
- Home arena: O'Connell Center

2021–22 Southeastern Conference men's basketball standings
	Conf.				Overall
Team	W		L	PCT	W		L	PCT
No. 14 Auburn	15	–	3	.833	28	–	6	.824
No. 16 Kentucky	14	–	4	.778	26	–	8	.765
No. 15 Tennessee †	14	–	4	.778	27	–	8	.771
No. 8 Arkansas	13	–	5	.722	28	–	9	.757
LSU	9	–	9	.500	22	–	12	.647
Alabama	9	–	9	.500	19	–	14	.576
South Carolina	9	–	9	.500	18	–	13	.581
Texas A&M	9	–	9	.500	27	–	13	.675
Florida	9	–	9	.500	20	–	14	.588
Mississippi State	8	–	10	.444	18	–	16	.529
Vanderbilt	7	–	11	.389	19	–	17	.528
Missouri	5	–	13	.278	12	–	21	.364
Ole Miss	4	–	14	.222	13	–	19	.406
Georgia	1	–	17	.056	6	–	26	.188
† 2022 SEC tournament winner Rankings from AP poll

The 2021–22 Florida Gators men's basketball team represented the University of Florida during the 2021–22 NCAA Division I men's basketball season. The team was led by seventh-year head coach Mike White, and played their home games at the O'Connell Center in Gainesville, Florida as a member of the Southeastern Conference. They finished the season 20–14, 9–9 in SEC Play to finish a five-way tie for fifth place. As the No. 9 seed in the SEC tournament, they lost in the second round to Texas A&M. They received an at-large bid to the National Invitation Tournament where they defeated Iona in the first round before losing to Xavier.

On March 13, 2022, head coach Mike White left the school to take the head coaching position at Georgia. On March 18, the school named San Francisco head coach Todd Golden the team's new head coach.

== Previous season ==
In a season limited by the ongoing COVID-19 pandemic, the Gators finished the 2020–21 season 15–10, 9–7 in SEC play to finish in fifth place. They defeated Vanderbilt in the second round of the SEC tournament before losing to Tennessee in the quarterfinals. They received an at-large bid to the NCAA tournament as the No. 7 seed in the South region. There they defeated Virginia Tech before losing to Oral Roberts in the second round.

== Offseason ==
=== Departures ===
Name	Number	Pos.	Height	Weight	Year	Hometown	Reason for departure
Ques Glover	0	G	5'11"	182	Sophomore	Knoxville, TN	Transferred to Samford
Tre Mann	1	G	6'5"	190	Sophomore	Gainesville, FL	Declare for 2021 NBA draft
Samson Ruzhentsev	2	F	6'7"	192	Freshman	Moscow, Russia	Signed to play professionally in Serbia with Mega Basket
Omar Payne	5	F	6'10"	230	Sophomore	Kissimmee, FL	Transferred to Illinois
Noah Locke	10	G	6'3"	203	Junior	Baltimore, MD	Transferred to Louisville
Osayi Osifo	15	F	6'7"	225	Junior	Bedworth Park, South Africa	Transferred to Jacksonville
Scottie Lewis	23	G	6'5"	189	Sophomore	Hazlet, NJ	Declare for 2021 NBA draft

=== Incoming transfers ===
Name	Number	Pos.	Height	Weight	Year	Hometown	Previous School
Myreon Jones	0	G	6'3"	175	Senior	Birmingham, AL	Penn State
CJ Felder	1	F	6'7"	231	Junior	Sumter, SC	Boston College
Brandon McKissic	23	G	6'3"	185	Graduate Student	Ferguson, MO	Kansas City
Phlandrous Fleming Jr.	24	G	6'5"	205	Graduate Student	Athens, GA	Charleston Southern
Tuongthach Gathek	32	F	6'9"	172	Sophomore	Portland, ME	Trinity Valley CC

=== 2021 recruiting class ===
College recruiting information
Name	Hometown	School	Height	Weight	Commit date
Kowacie Reeves #14 SF	Macon, GA	Westside High School	6 ft 5 in (1.96 m)	180 lb (82 kg)	Apr 30, 2020
Kowacie Reeves #14 SF	Recruit ratings: Scout: Rivals: 247Sports: ESPN: (84)				
Elijah Kennedy; SF	Virginia Beach, VA	Green Run High School	6 ft 4 in (1.93 m)	180 lb (82 kg)	Aug 2, 2021
Elijah Kennedy; SF	Recruit ratings: Scout: Rivals: 247Sports: ESPN: (NR)				
Overall recruit ranking:
Note: In many cases, Scout, Rivals, 247Sports, On3, and ESPN may conflict in their listings of height and weight.; In these cases, the average was taken. ESPN grades are on a 100-point scale.; Sources: "2021 Florida Basketball Commits". Scout.; "Scout.com Team Recruiting Rankings". Scout.; "2021 Team Ranking". Rivals.

=== 2022 recruiting class ===
College recruiting information (2022)
Name	Hometown	School	Height	Weight	Commit date
Malik Reneau #6 C	Hialeah Gardens, FL	Montverde Academy	6 ft 8 in (2.03 m)	215 lb (98 kg)	Sep 1, 2021
Malik Reneau #6 C	Recruit ratings: Scout: Rivals: 247Sports: ESPN: (89)				
Denzel Aberdeen #41 SG	Orlando, FL	Dr. Phillips High School	6 ft 4 in (1.93 m)	175 lb (79 kg)	Sep 19, 2021
Denzel Aberdeen #41 SG	Recruit ratings: Scout: Rivals: 247Sports: ESPN: (80)				
Overall recruit ranking:
Note: In many cases, Scout, Rivals, 247Sports, On3, and ESPN may conflict in their listings of height and weight.; In these cases, the average was taken. ESPN grades are on a 100-point scale.; Sources: "2022 Florida Basketball Commits". Scout.; "Scout.com Team Recruiting Rankings". Scout.; "2022 Team Ranking". Rivals.

== Roster ==
2021–22 Florida Gators men's basketball team
Players
Coaches

Pos.	#	Name	Height	Weight	Year	Previous school	Hometown
G	0	Myreon Jones	6 ft 3 in (1.91 m)	175 lb (79 kg)	Sr	Penn State	Birmingham, Alabama
F	1	C. J. Felder	6 ft 7 in (2.01 m)	231 lb (105 kg)	Jr	Boston College	Sumter, South Carolina
G	3	Alex Klatsky (W)	6 ft 4 in (1.93 m)	185 lb (84 kg)	So	Ranney School	Colts Neck, New Jersey
F	4	Anthony Duruji	6 ft 7 in (2.01 m)	209 lb (95 kg)	RS Sr	Louisiana Tech	Germantown, Maryland
G	10	Elijah Kennedy	6 ft 3 in (1.91 m)	185 lb (84 kg)	Fr	Green Run	Virginia Beach, Virginia
F	11	Keyontae Johnson	6 ft 5 in (1.96 m)	229 lb (104 kg)	Sr	Oak Hill Academy	Norfolk, Virginia
F	12	Colin Castleton	6 ft 11 in (2.11 m)	240 lb (109 kg)	Sr	Michigan	DeLand, Florida
G	14	Kowacie Reeves	6 ft 6 in (1.98 m)	182 lb (83 kg)	Fr	Westside	Macon, Georgia
G	20	Jack May (W)	6 ft 4 in (1.93 m)	175 lb (79 kg)	So	Saint Andrew's School	Boca Raton, Florida
G	22	Tyree Appleby	6 ft 1 in (1.85 m)	163 lb (74 kg)	RS Sr	Cleveland State	Jacksonville, Arkansas
G	23	Brandon McKissic	6 ft 3 in (1.91 m)	185 lb (84 kg)	GS	Kansas City	Ferguson, Missouri
G	24	Phlandrous Fleming Jr.	6 ft 5 in (1.96 m)	205 lb (93 kg)	GS	Charleston Southern	Athens, Georgia
F	32	Tuongthach Gatkek	6 ft 9 in (2.06 m)	172 lb (78 kg)	So	Trinity Valley CC	Portland, Maine
C	33	Jason Jitoboh	6 ft 11 in (2.11 m)	305 lb (138 kg)	Jr	Hamilton Heights (TN)	Abuja, Nigeria
G	44	Niels Lane	6 ft 5 in (1.96 m)	206 lb (93 kg)	So	Rosselle Catholic	Freehold, New Jersey

Head coach

- Mike White (Mississippi)

Assistant coach(es)

- Al Pinkens (NC State)
- Erik Pastrana (Florida State)
- Akeem Miskdeen (Queens (NC))

Legend

- (C) Team captain
- (S) Suspended
- (I) Ineligible
- (W) Walk-on
- Injured
- Current redshirt

Roster

== Schedule and results ==
Date time, TV	Rank^{#}	Opponent^{#}	Result	Record	High points	High rebounds	High assists	Site (attendance) city, state
Exhibition
November 1, 2021*; 7:00 p.m., SECN+		Embry–Riddle	W 80–57		20 – McKissic	9 – Castleton	7 – Appleby	O'Connell Center; Gainesville, FL
Regular season
November 9, 2021*; 8:00 p.m., SECN+		Elon	W 74–61	1–0	20 – Jones	7 – Duruji	4 – Castleton	O'Connell Center (9,275); Gainesville, FL
November 14, 2021*; 1:00 p.m., ESPN		No. 20 Florida State; Rivalry	W 71–55	2–0	15 – Tied	16 – Castleton	5 – Appleby	O'Connell Center (10,011); Gainesville, FL
November 18, 2021*; 6:00 p.m., SECN+	No. 24	Milwaukee; Fort Myers Tip-Off campus site-game	W 81–45	3–0	19 – Castleton	10 – Castleton	5 – Tied	O'Connell Center (8,223); Gainesville, FL
November 22, 2021*; 8:30 p.m., FS1	No. 23	vs. California; Fort Myers Tip-Off Beach Division semifinals	W 80–60	4–0	16 – Castleton	8 – Castleton	3 – Tied	Suncoast Credit Union Arena (3,500); Fort Myers, FL
November 24, 2021*; 8:30 p.m., FS1	No. 23	vs. Ohio State; Fort Myers Tip-Off Beach Division championship game	W 71–68	5–0	19 – Fleming Jr.	13 – Castleton	3 – Castleton	Suncoast Credit Union Arena (3,500); Fort Myers, FL
November 28, 2021*; 12:00 p.m., SECN	No. 23	Troy	W 84–45	6–0	12 – Tied	8 – Castleton	4 – Jones	O'Connell Center (8,875); Gainesville, FL
December 1, 2021*; 8:00 p.m., BSSUN/BSFL	No. 14	at Oklahoma	L 67–74	6–1	17 – Fleming Jr.	11 – Castleton	2 – Tied	Lloyd Noble Center (9,539); Norman, OK
December 6, 2021*; 6:00 p.m., SECN+	No. 20	Texas Southern	L 54–69	6–2	15 – McKissic	5 – Castleton	3 – Tied	O'Connell Center (7,623); Gainesville, FL
December 8, 2021*; 7:00 p.m., SECN	No. 20	North Florida	W 85–55	7–2	26 – Castleton	8 – Castleton	3 – Tied	O'Connell Center (7,705); Gainesville, FL
December 12, 2021*; 4:30 p.m., BTN	No. 20	vs. Maryland; Basketball Hall of Fame Invitational	L 68–70	7–3	15 – Tied	11 – Fleming Jr.	4 – Tied	Barclays Center (7,124); Brooklyn, NY
December 18, 2021*; 1:00 p.m., BSSUN		vs. South Florida; Orange Bowl Basketball Classic	W 66–55	8–3	12 – Castleton	11 – Castleton	5 – McKissic	FLA Live Arena; Sunrise, FL
December 22, 2021*; 2:00 p.m., SECN+		Stony Brook	W 87–62	9–3	20 – Fleming Jr.	7 – Tied	7 – Appleby	O'Connell Center (8,063); Gainesville, FL
January 5, 2022; 7:00 p.m., ESPN2		No. 15 Alabama	L 70–83	9–4 (0–1)	19 – Castleton	7 – Tied	5 – Appleby	O'Connell Center (10,210); Gainesville, FL
January 8, 2022; 8:00 p.m., ESPN2		at No. 9 Auburn	L 73–85	9–5 (0–2)	22 – Castleton	10 – Castleton	9 – Appleby	Auburn Arena (9,121); Auburn, AL
January 12, 2022; 7:00 p.m., ESPN2		No. 12 LSU	L 58–64	9–6 (0–3)	19 – Castleton	9 – Castleton	3 – Jones	O'Connell Center (10,110); Gainesville, FL
January 15, 2022; 1:00 p.m., SECN		at South Carolina	W 71–63	10–6 (1–3)	14 – Tied	7 – Castleton	6 – Appleby	Colonial Life Arena (10,813); Columbia, SC
January 19, 2022; 6:30 p.m., SECN		Mississippi State	W 80–72	11–6 (2–3)	22 – Duruji	5 – McKissic	5 – Tied	O'Connell Center (10,008); Gainesville, FL
January 22, 2022; 1:00 p.m., SECN		Vanderbilt	W 61–42	12–6 (3–3)	11 – Appleby	10 – Jitoboh	4 – McKissic	O'Connell Center (10,345); Gainesville, FL
January 24, 2022; 7:00 p.m., SECN+		at Ole Miss	L 54–70	12–7 (3–4)	12 – Jitoboh	5 – Jitoboh	4 – Appleby	SJB Pavilion (6,273); Oxford, MS
January 26, 2022; 6:00 p.m., ESPN2		at No. 18 Tennessee	L 71–78	12–8 (3–5)	16 – Tied	6 – Duruji	7 – Appleby	Thompson–Boling Arena (20,789); Knoxville, TN
January 29, 2022*; 4:00 p.m., ESPN2		Oklahoma State; Big 12/SEC Challenge	W 81–72	13–8	21 – Appleby	6 – Fleming Jr.	4 – Appleby	O'Connell Center (10,056); Gainesville, FL
February 2, 2022; 3:00 p.m., SECN		at Missouri	W 66–65	14–8 (4–5)	17 – Appleby	6 – Fleming Jr.	3 – Fleming Jr.	Mizzou Arena; Columbia, MO
February 5, 2022; 3:30 p.m., SECN		Ole Miss	W 62–57 ^{OT}	15–8 (5–5)	17 – Castleton	7 – Tied	10 – Appleby	O'Connell Center (10,007); Gainesville, FL
February 9, 2022; 6:30 p.m., SECN		Georgia	W 72–63	16–8 (6–5)	23 – Jones	9 – Castleton	3 – Appleby	O'Connell Center (9,929); Gainesville, FL
February 12, 2022; 4:00 p.m., ESPN		at No. 5 Kentucky; Rivalry	L 57–78	16–9 (6–6)	18 – Castleton	7 – Castleton	4 – Castleton	Rupp Arena (20,383); Lexington, KY
February 15, 2022; 7:00 p.m., SECN		at Texas A&M	L 55–56	16–10 (6–7)	15 – Castleton	15 – Castleton	3 – Lane	Reed Arena (6,349); College Station, TX
February 19, 2022; 2:00 p.m., ESPN		No. 2 Auburn	W 63–62	17–10 (7–7)	26 – Appleby	8 – Castleton	5 – Fleming Jr.	O'Connell Center (11,255); Gainesville, FL
February 22, 2022; 7:00 p.m., ESPN2		No. 18 Arkansas	L 74–82	17–11 (7–8)	29 – Castleton	8 – Fleming Jr.	5 – Jones	O'Connell Center (9,023); Gainesville, FL
February 26, 2022; 12:00 p.m., ESPN2		at Georgia	W 84–72	18–11 (8–8)	27 – Fleming Jr.	12 – Castleton	7 – Appleby	Stegeman Coliseum (9,070); Athens, GA
March 1, 2022; 8:30 p.m., SECN		at Vanderbilt	W 82–78	19–11 (9–8)	18 – Castleton	8 – Castleton	6 – Fleming Jr.	Memorial Gymnasium (6,568); Nashville, TN
March 5, 2022; 2:00 p.m., CBS		No. 7 Kentucky; Rivalry	L 63–71	19–12 (9–9)	23 – Castleton	11 – Castleton	8 – McKissic	O'Connell Center (9,788); Gainesville, FL
SEC tournament
March 10, 2022; 12:00 p.m., SECN	(9)	vs. (8) Texas A&M; Second Round	L 80–83 ^{OT}	19–13	21 – Reeves	9 – Lane	4 – Fleming Jr.	Amalie Arena (10,295); Tampa, FL
NIT tournament
March 16, 2022*; 9:00 p.m., ESPN2	(3)	Iona; First Round – Dayton Bracket	W 79–74	20–13	18 – Tied	13 – Castleton	5 – Appleby	O'Connell Center (3,023); Gainesville, FL
March 20, 2022*; 1:00 p.m., ESPN	(3)	at (2) Xavier; Second Round – Dayton Bracket	L 56–72	20–14	14 – Reeves	8 – Fleming Jr.	3 – Tied	Cintas Center (3,437); Cincinnati, OH
*Non-conference game. ^{#}Rankings from AP Poll. (#) Tournament seedings in parentheses. All times are in Eastern Time.

== Rankings ==
Ranking movements Legend: ██ Increase in ranking ██ Decrease in ranking — = Not ranked RV = Received votes
	Week																				
Poll	Pre	1	2	3	4	5	6	7	8	9	10	11	12	13	14	15	16	17	18	19	Final
AP	—	24	23	14	20	—	—	—	—	—	—	RV	—	—	—	—	—	—			Not released
Coaches	—	—*	24	12	16	RV	RV	RV	RV	—	—	—	—	—	—	—	—	—			

*AP does not release post-NCAA tournament rankings. No Coaches Poll for Week 1.

== See also ==
- 2021–22 Florida Gators women's basketball team
