= DJ Horne =

American basketball player (born 2000)

No. 0 – Limoges CSP
- Position: Point guard
- League: LNB Élite

Personal information
- Born: October 31, 2000 (age 26) Raleigh, North Carolina, U.S.
- Listed height: 6 ft 1 in (1.85 m)
- Listed weight: 180 lb (82 kg)

Career information
- High school: Cary (Cary, North Carolina); Trinity Christian (Fayetteville, North Carolina)
- College: Illinois State (2019–2021); Arizona State (2021–2023); NC State (2023–2024)
- NBA draft: 2024: undrafted
- Playing career: 2024–present

Career history
- 2024–2026: Heidelberg
- 2026–present: Limoges

Career highlights
- Third-team All-ACC (2024); MVC All-Freshman team (2020)

Damariae "DJ" Horne (born October 31, 2000) is an American professional basketball player for Limoges of the French LNB Élite. He played college basketball for the Illinois State Redbirds, the Arizona State Devils, and the NC State Wolfpack.

== Early life and high school ==
DJ Horne grew up playing on the AAU team Garner Road Bulldogs as well as at Reedy Creek Middle School and Cary High School before transferring to Trinity Christian in Fayetteville for his senior year of high school. At Reedy Creek Middle School, Horne lead the Eagles to an undefeated season and conference championship in 2015

Coming out of high school, Horne committed to play college basketball for the Illinois State Redbirds.

== College career ==
=== Illinois State ===
On December 31, 2019, Horne scored a career-high 22 points while also notching five steals in a win over Northern Iowa. During his freshman season in 2019–20 he averaged 8.7 points, 3.9 rebounds, and 1.5 assists per game while appearing in 30 games with 24 starts. Horne was named to the Missouri Valley Conference all-freshman team. In 2020–21, he averaged 15.1 points, 2.7 assists, and 3.7 rebounds per game. After the season, Horne entered the NCAA transfer portal.

=== Arizona State ===
Horne transferred to play for the Arizona State Sun Devils. He finished his first season with Arizona State in 2021–22 playing in 30 games with 28 starts where he averaged 12.5 points, 2.5 rebounds, and 1.9 assists per game. In the 2022–23 season opener, Horne scored 25 points in a win over Northern Arizona. During the 2022–23 season, he averaged 12.5 points, 3.4 rebounds, and 2.4 assists per game, while shooting 36% from three. After the season, Horne entered his name into the NCAA transfer portal as a graduate transfer.

=== NC State ===
Horne transferred to play for the NC State Wolfpack. On December 12, 2023, he scored 22 points while knocking down six three-pointers in a win over the UT Martin. On January 16, 2024, Horne scored 21 points in a win over Wake Forest, but was surrounded in controversy after being seen giving the opposing players the middle finger. On February 10, 2024, he scored 31 points while knocking down four threes in an 83–79 loss to Wake Forest. In the ACC tournament finals, Horne dropped 29 points in a win over rival North Carolina as he helped the Wolfpack clinch a bid to the 2024 NCAA tournament.

== Professional career ==
On June 27, 2024, Horne signed an Exhibit 10 contract with the San Antonio Spurs.

=== Limoges CSP (2026–present) ===
On July 21, 2026, he signed with Limoges of the French LNB Élite.
