= Trinity Christian School (Fayetteville, North Carolina) =

Coordinates: 35.1117°N 78.9049°W

- 3727 Rosehill Rd; Fayetteville, North Carolina 28311; United States

Information
- Type: Private; college-preparatory; day; Christian school
- Religious affiliation: Christian
- Denomination: Non-denominational
- Established: 1990
- Grades: K–12
- Gender: Co-educational
- Enrollment: 543
- Student to teacher ratio: 20:1
- Campus type: Rural
- Colors: Red, White, and Black
- Athletics: North Carolina Independent Schools Athletic Association (NCISAA)
- Athletics conference: Southeastern Independent Conference (SEIC)
- Sports: basketball, cheerleading, football, soccer, volleyball
- Mascot: Crusader
- Nickname: Crusaders
- Rival: Fayetteville Christian Academy
- Tuition: Free
- Website: www.trinitycommunityservices.org

Trinity Christian School is a K–12 private, co-educational, college preparatory school in conjunction with Trinity Community Services located in Fayetteville, North Carolina, United States.

== History ==
The school was founded in 1990 by Trinity Community Services serving students from the surrounding Fayetteville metropolitan area.

== Athletics ==
Trinity competes in the North Carolina Independent Schools Athletic Association (NCISAA) in the 1A level. They also compete in the Southeastern Independent Conference (SEIC) during football season. Sports offered include basketball, football, soccer, and volleyball.

== Notable alumni ==
- Joey Baker (Class of 2018), professional basketball player, played college basketball for Duke Blue Devils and Michigan Wolverines
- DJ Horne (Class of 2019), college basketball player
- Dennis Smith Jr. (Class of 2016), NBA player for Brooklyn Nets, played college basketball at NC State University
- Au'Diese Toney (Class of 2018), professional basketball player
