= Hall of Fame Classic (basketball tournament) =

Annual basketball tournament

The Hall of Fame Classic (formerly known as the Guardians Classic, CBE Classic, and CBE Hall of Fame Classic) created by the National Association of Basketball Coaches (NABC) is an annual season-opening college basketball tournament founded in 2001. The tournament is currently held in mid-November at T-Mobile Center in Kansas City, Missouri, which also contains the National Collegiate Basketball Hall of Fame. Before the 2007 tournament, the final rounds were held at Municipal Auditorium, except for one year at Kemper Arena in 2001.

== Tournament format ==
From the inaugural tournament in 2001 until 2019, twelve teams participated in the tournament. In this format; the first two rounds were played at campus sites on two different days hosted by regional hosts, regional hosts automatically advanced to the championship rounds which are played at T-Mobile Center in Kansas City, Missouri. Championship rounds took place one week after the initial round. Teams not hosting advanced to sub regional rounds where they played three games. From 2020 until 2023 and again since 2025, four teams participate in a traditional four team tournament with a Championship and Consolation game. The 2024 and 2026 Hall of Fame Classics were showcase doubleheaders, instead of traditional four team tournaments.

== History ==
Year	Championship game			Consolation game		
Year	Champion	Score	Runner-up	Third place	Score	Fourth place
2001	Missouri	78–77	Iowa	Alabama	81–70	Memphis
2002	Creighton	80–75	Notre Dame	Furman	70–62	IUPUI
2003	South Carolina	67–61	Richmond	Missouri State	72–52	San Francisco
2004	Creighton	65–64 (OT)	Ohio State	Houston	57–55	Missouri
2005	Texas	68–59	Iowa	Kentucky	80–66	West Virginia
2006	Marquette	73–62	Duke	Air Force	67–53	Texas Tech
2007	UCLA	68–63	Michigan State	Missouri	84–70	Maryland
2008	Syracuse	89–81 (OT)	Kansas	Florida	86–84	Washington
2009	Texas	78–62	Pittsburgh	Wichita State	74–57	Iowa
2010	Duke	82–68	Kansas State	Gonzaga	66–63	Marquette
2011	Missouri	92–53	Cal	Georgia	61–57	Notre Dame
2012	Kansas	73–59	St. Louis	Texas A&M	55–54	Washington State
2013	Wichita State	75–62	BYU	Texas	77–59	DePaul
2014	Maryland	72–63	Iowa State	Alabama	76–71	Arizona State
2015	North Carolina	80–70	Kansas State	Northwestern	67–62	Missouri
2016	Kansas	65–54	Georgia	UAB	81–74	George Washington
2017	Baylor	65–59	Creighton	UCLA	72–70	Wisconsin
2018	Texas Tech	70–52	Nebraska	USC	99–80	Missouri State
2019	Butler	69–68	Stanford	Oklahoma	77–66	Missouri
2020	TCU	56–52	Liberty	South Carolina	69–58	Tulsa
2021	Arkansas	73–67	Cincinnati	Illinois	72–64	Kansas State
2022	San Francisco	67–63	Wichita State	Grand Canyon	69–67	Northern Iowa
2023	Colorado State	69–48	Creighton	Loyola Chicago	71–68	Boston College
2024	Showcase Format					
2025	Nebraska	86–85	Kansas State	New Mexico	80–78	Mississippi State
2026	Showcase Format					

== Brackets ==
* – Denotes overtime period

=== 2026 ===
December 18
Iowa State
Missouri State

December 18
Drake
Wichita State

=== 2025 ===
Semifinals; November 20; Peacock/NBC Sports NOW
Nebraska	84
New Mexico	72
Kansas State	98
Mississippi State	77

Championship; November 21; Peacock/NBC Sports NOW
Nebraska	86
Kansas State	85
Consolation; November 21; Peacock/NBC Sports NOW
New Mexico	80
Mississippi State	78

=== 2024 ===
November 22; BTN
Iowa	69
Utah State	77

November 22; Peacock
Wichita State	88
Saint Louis	63

=== 2023 ===
Semifinals; November 22; CBSSN
Boston College	74
Colorado State	86
8	Creighton	88
Loyola Chicago	65

Championship; November 23; CBSSN
Colorado State	69
8	Creighton	48
Consolation; November 23; CBSSN
Boston College	68
Loyola Chicago	71

=== 2022 ===
Semifinals; November 21; CBSSN
San Francisco	75
Northern Iowa	69
Grand Canyon	43
Wichita State	55

Championship; November 22; CBSSN
San Francisco	67
Wichita State	63
Consolation; November 22; CBSSN
Northern Iowa	67
Grand Canyon	69

=== 2021 ===
Semifinals; November 22; ESPNews
Cincinnati	71
14	Illinois	51
13	Arkansas	72
Kansas State	64

Championship; November 23; ESPN2
Cincinnati	67
13	Arkansas	73
Consolation; November 23; ESPNews
14	Illinois	72
Kansas State	64

=== 2020 ===
Semifinals; November 28
Liberty	78
South Carolina	62
TCU	70
Tulsa	65

Championship; November 29
Liberty	52
TCU	56
Consolation; November 29
South Carolina	69
Tulsa	58

All matches aired on ESPN Networks

=== 2019 ===
==== Host Rounds ====
Game 1 November 16; FS1		Game 2 November 22; FS1
		Butler	68
Butler	80	Morehead State	50
Wofford	61

Game 1 November 18; SECN+		Game 2 November 20; SECN+
		Missouri	70
Missouri	75	Morehead State	52
Wofford	56

Game 1 November 19; P12N		Game 2 November 22; P12N
		Stanford	81
Stanford	76	William & Mary	50
Maryland Eastern Shore	55

Game 1 November 18; Fox Sports Oklahoma		Game 2 November 21; Fox Sports Oklahoma
		Oklahoma	91
Oklahoma	75	Maryland Eastern Shore	64
William & Mary	70

==== Championship Round ====
Semifinals; November 25; ESPNU; ESPNU/ESPN2
Butler	63
Missouri	52
Stanford	73
Oklahoma	54

Championship; November 26; ESPN2
Butler	68
Stanford	67
Consolation; November 26; ESPNews
Missouri	66
Oklahoma	77

==== Subhost Rounds ====
Wofford Subhost; November 12
Wofford	79
William & Mary	80

Morehead State Subhost; November 16
Morehead State	76
Maryland Eastern Shore	53

Maryland Eastern Shore Subhost; November 26
Maryland Eastern Shore	42
Wofford	67

William & Mary Subhost; November 26
William & Mary	95
Morehead State	84

=== 2018 ===
==== Host Rounds ====
Game 1 November 6 Pac-12 Network		Game 2 November 14; Pac-12 Network
		Stetson	59
Robert Morris	62	USC	95
USC	83

Game 1 November 6 BTN+		Game 2 November 11; ESPNU
		Southeastern Louisiana	35
Mississippi Valley State	37	Nebraska	87
Nebraska	106

Game 1 November 9 Fox Sports Southwest+		Game 2 November 13; Fox Sports Southwest
		Southeastern Louisiana	40
Mississippi Valley State	52	Texas Tech	59
Texas Tech	84

Game 1 November 9 ESPN3		Game 2 November 11; KOZL
		Stetson	70
Robert Morris	60	Missouri State	83
Missouri State	74

==== Championship Round ====
Semifinals; November 19; ESPNU; ESPNU/ESPN2
Texas Tech	78
USC	63
Nebraska	85
Missouri State	62

Championship; November 20; ESPN2
Texas Tech	70
Nebraska	52
Consolation; November 20; ESPN3
USC	99
Missouri State	80

==== Subhost Rounds ====
Southeastern Louisiana Subhost; November 17
Stetson	57
Southeastern Louisiana	69

Robert Morris Subhost; November 17
Mississippi Valley State	59
Robert Morris	68

Stetson Subhost; November 19
Stetson	72
Robert Morris	81

Mississippi Valley State Subhost; November 12
Southeastern Louisiana	59
Mississippi Valley State	69

=== 2017 ===
==== Host Rounds ====
Game 1 November 10; Fox Sports Southwest			Game 2 November 17; Fox College Sports
				Alcorn State	61
	Central Arkansas	66	25	Baylor	78
24	Baylor	107

Game 1 November 10; Big Ten Network +		Game 2 November 12; Big Ten Network
		Yale	61
South Carolina State	50	Wisconsin	89
Wisconsin	85

Game 1 November 10; Fox Sports Midwest		Game 2 November 12; Fox Sports 1
		Alcorn State	72
Yale	76	Creighton	109
Creighton	92

Game 1 November 15; Pac-12 Network			Game 2 November 17; Pac-12 Network
				South Carolina State	68
	Central Arkansas	101	23	UCLA	96
23	UCLA	106*

==== Championship Round ====
Semifinals; November 20; ESPNU; ESPN2
Creighton	100
23	UCLA	89
22	Baylor	70
Wisconsin	65

Championship; November 21; ESPN2
Creighton	59
22	Baylor	65
Consolation; November 21; ESPN3
23	UCLA	72
Wisconsin	70

==== Subhost Rounds ====
Game 1 November 14		Game 2 November 19
		Alcorn State	76
South Carolina State	54	Central Arkansas	102
Yale	86

Game 1 November 21		Game 2 November 22
		Yale	87
Central Arkansas	73	Alcorn State	73
South Carolina State	64

=== 2016 ===
==== Championship Round ====
Semifinals; November 21
George Washington	73
Georgia	81
5	Kansas	83
UAB	63

Championship; November 22
Georgia	54
5	Kansas	65
Consolation
George Washington	74
UAB	81

==== Subhost Rounds ====
UNC Asheville Subhost; November 20
Siena	80
UNC Asheville	92

Furman Subhost; November 22
UNC Asheville	64
Furman	58

Siena Subhost; November
Arkansas–Pine Bluff	43
Siena	66

=== 2015 ===
==== Championship Round ====
Semifinals; November 23
Kansas State	66
Missouri	42
9	North Carolina	80
Northwestern	69

Championship Game; November 24
Kansas State	70
9	North Carolina	80
Consolation
Missouri	62
Northwestern	67

==== Subhost Rounds ====
Wofford Subhost; November 21
Maryland Eastern Shore	63
Wofford	73

Columbia Subhost; November 24
Wofford	59
Columbia	70

MD Eastern Shore Subhost; November 24
Fairfield	113
Maryland Eastern Shore	74

Fairfield Subhost; November 27
Columbia	81
Fairfield	82^{OT}

=== 2014 ===
Semifinals; November
Arizona State	73
Maryland	78
Alabama	74
13	Iowa State	84

Championship; November
Maryland	72
13	Iowa State	63
Consolation
Arizona State	71
Alabama	76

== Future fields ==
=== 2025 ===
Kansas State, Mississippi State and Nebraska, will headline the 2025 Hall of Fame Classic, with the fourth team was New Mexico announced.
