= Northwood Temple Academy =

Private Christian school in North Carolina, United States of America

Coordinates: 35°07′03″N 78°52′45″W

Northwood Temple Academy, also known as NTA, is a private, Christian school that is a part of Northwood Temple Pentecostal Holiness Church. Located at 4200 Ramsey Street, Fayetteville, North Carolina, it has approximately 460 students enrolled. There are weekly chapel services and/or reboot groups. Northwood is PreK-12, and has AP and honors classes for high school. Northwood Temple Academy is ACSI, SACS, and CASA accredited. The school also has a band class that accepts students from 6th-12th grades. Northwood Temple offers a variety of sports at various levels, including: Boys and Girls soccer (Middle School and Varsity), Volleyball (Middle School, Varsity, and JV) Basketball (Middle School, Varsity, and JV). The current Head of School is Renee McLamb, and the current principals are Ann Warren (9-12), Stephanie Marsh (6-8), and Greg Ray(K-5).

== Child baptisms without parental consent ==
In September 2022, NTA baptized approximately 100 schoolchildren without informing, or seeking consent from, their parents. Some parents only learned their children had been baptized that day when their children requested to be brought dry clothes. Many parents that practice adult baptism were upset because they were not present for an important religious ceremony for their children; others were upset as their children were already baptized, and felt that a second baptism effectively undid the first baptism. The school's principal said, "In hindsight, we would do it differently."

== Demographics ==
According to ProPublica in 2020, the student body was 100% White while Cumberland County Schools were 28.1% White.
