= North Carolina Central Eagles men's basketball statistical leaders =

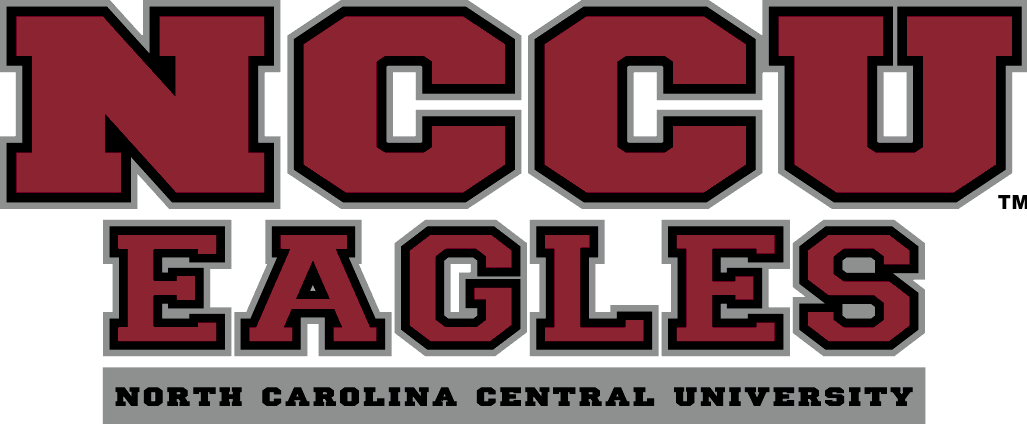

The North Carolina Central Eagles men's basketball statistical leaders are individual statistical leaders of the North Carolina Central Eagles men's basketball program in various categories, including points, three-pointers, assists, blocks, rebounds, and steals. Within those areas, the lists identify single-game, single-season, and career leaders. The Eagles represent North Carolina Central University in the NCAA's Mid-Eastern Athletic Conference.

North Carolina Central began competing in intercollegiate basketball in 1927. However, the school's record book does not generally list records from before the 1950s, as records from before this period are often incomplete and inconsistent. Since scoring was much lower in this era, and teams played much fewer games during a typical season, it is likely that few or no players from this era would appear on these lists anyway.

The NCAA did not officially record assists as a stat until the 1983–84 season, and blocks and steals until the 1985–86 season, but North Carolina Central's record books includes players in these stats before these seasons. These lists are updated through the end of the 2020–21 season.

== Scoring ==
Career
Rk	Player	Points	Seasons
1	Ted Manning	2,086	1962–63 1963–64 1964–65 1965–66
2	Sam Jones	1,745	1951–52 1952–53 1953–54 1956–57
3	LeVelle Moton	1,714	1992–93 1993–94 1994–95 1995–96
4	Robert McClellan	1,562	1975–76 1976–77 1977–78 1978–79
5	Carlton Bell	1,534	1955–56 1956–57 1957–58 1958–59
6	Jeremy Ingram	1,525	2010–11 2011–12 2012–13 2013–14
	David Binion	1,525	1978–79 1979–80 1980–81 1982–83
8	Curtis Knight	1,476	2001–02 2002–03 2003–04 2004–05
9	James Martin	1,454	1958–59 1959–60 1960–61 1961–62
10	Ernest Warlick	1,407	1948–49 1949–50 1950–51 1951–52

Season
Rk	Player	Points	Season
1	Ted Manning	826	1964–65
2	Jeremy Ingram	708	2013–14
3	Patrick Cole	636	2016–17
4	John Bishop	625	1980–81
5	LeVelle Moton	611	1994–95
6	David Young	594	2003–04
7	Jibri Blount	593	2019–20
8	LeVelle Moton	574	1995–96
9	Willie Jennette	573	1985–86
10	Landon Clement	561	2010–11

Single game
Rk	Player	Points	Season	Opponent
1	Rudolph “Rocky” Roberson	58	1942–43	Shaw
2	Sam Jones	44	1953–54	North Carolina A&T
3	Willie Jennette	43	1985–86	Gardner-Webb
4	C.J. Wilkerson	41	2010–11	North Carolina A&T
5	Jeremy Ingram	38	2013–14	Savannah State
	Gage Lattimore	38	2025–26	Bluefield State
7	Keishon Porter	37	2023–24	South Carolina State
	Jeremy Ingram	37	2013–14	Wichita State
	Jamar Briscoe	37	2008–09	Longwood
	Drew Johnson	37	2005–06	Fayetteville State

== Rebounds ==
Career
Rk	Player	Rebounds	Seasons
1	Carlton Bell	1,555	1955–56 1956–57 1957–58 1958–59
2	David Binion	1,123	1978–79 1979–80 1980–81 1982–83
3	Ted Manning	1,118	1962–63 1963–64 1964–65 1965–66
4	Lee Davis	1,074	1964–65 1965–66 1966–67 1967–68
5	Robert Little	912	1971–72 1972–73 1973–74 1974–75
6	John Jones	905	1959–60 1960–61 1961–62 1962–63
7	James Martin	838	1958–59 1959–60 1960–61 1961–62
8	Edward Roper	825	1975–76 1976–77 1977–78 1978–79
9	Joseph Pridgen	808	1965–66 1966–67 1967–68 1968–69
10	Jimmy Boston	801	1997–98 1998–99 1999–00 2000–01

Season
Rk	Player	Rebounds	Season
1	Carlton Bell	563	1958–59
2	David Binion	400	1982–83
3	Charles Murphy	315	1983–84
4	Raasean Davis	310	2018–19
5	David Binion	288	1979–80
6	Jibri Blount	287	2019–20
7	Raasean Davis	282	2017–18
8	Edward Roper	279	1977–78
9	Jordan Parks	273	2014–15
10	Zacarry Douglas	264	2018–19
	Derrick Leak	264	1986–87

Single game
Rk	Player	Rebounds	Season	Opponent
1	Carlton Bell	30	1958–59	Winston-Salem State
2	David Binion	27	1980–81	Virginia Union
3	David Covington	23	2001–02	Wingate University
4	Jimmy Boston	21	1997–98	St. Augustine's
5	Raasean Davis	20	2017–18	Savannah State
	Jimmy Boston	20	1997–98	Savannah State
	Robert Little	20	1974–75	Virginia State

== Assists ==
Career
Rk	Player	Assists	Seasons
1	Emanuel Chapman	617	2010–11 2011–12 2012–13 2013–14
2	Jordan Perkins	524	2017–18 2018–19 2019–20 2020–21
3	Michael Wright	409	1980–81 1982–83 1983–84 1984–85
4	Bryan Ayala	366	2005–06 2006–07 2007–08 2008–09
5	Donald Sinclair	360	1979–80 1980–81
6	Kevin Thompson	313	1984–85 1985–86 1986–87
7	Dajuan Graf	293	2015–16 2016–17
8	Jeffrey Hayes	288	1985–86 1986–87 1988–89 1989–90
9	Dionte Johnson	284	2024–25 2025–26
10	LeVelle Moton	278	1992–93 1993–94 1994–95 1995–96

Season
Rk	Player	Assists	Season
1	Emanuel Chapman	217	2013–14
2	Donald Sinclair	200	1979–80
3	Nimrod Hilliard	196	2014–15
4	Jordan Perkins	190	2017–18
5	Patrick Cole	184	2016–17
6	Emanuel Chapman	180	2012–13
7	Dajuan Graf	178	2016–17
8	Dionte Johnson	164	2025–26
9	Emanuel Chapman	162	2011–12
10	Donald Sinclair	160	1980–81

Single game
Rk	Player	Assists	Season	Opponent
1	Darnell Evans	16	1981–82	Saint Augustine's
	Dionte Johnson	16	2024–25	St. Andrews
3	Micheal Glasker	15	2009–10	Apprentice School
	Fred Cleveland Jr.	15	2023–24	Coppin State
5	Jordan Perkins	14	2017–18	Howard
	Emanuel Chapman	14	2011–12	Barber-Scotia
	Larry Crowder	14	1991–92	Livingstone
8	Eric Boone	13	2021–22	Delaware State
	Patrick Cole	13	2016–17	LIU Brooklyn
	Nimrod Hilliard	13	2014–15	ETSU
	Emanuel Chapman	13	2012–13	Coppin State

== Steals ==
Career
Rk	Player	Steals	Seasons
1	Bryan Ayala	196	2005–06 2006–07 2007–08 2008–09
2	Emanuel Chapman	173	2010–11 2011–12 2012–13 2013–14
3	Clifton Daye	172	1990–91 1991–92 1992–93
4	Shawn Ray	166	2000–01 2001–02 2002–03
5	Derrick Leak	158	1986–87 1987–88 1988–89 1989–90
6	Edward Roper	140	1975–76 1976–77 1977–78 1978–79
7	Curtis Knight	136	2001–02 2002–03 2003–04 2004–05
	Eric Boone	136	2021–22 2022–23
9	Stanley Melvin	135	1974–75 1975–76 1976–77 1977–78
10	Jimmie Walker	127	1992–93 1993–94

Season
Rk	Player	Steals	Season
1	Jimmie Walker	81	1992–93
2	Dionte Johnson	75	2025–26
3	Dominique Sutton	71	2011–12
	Eric Boone	71	2021–22
5	Emanuel Chapman	69	2013–14
6	Larry Crowder	67	1991–92
7	Donald Sinclair	66	1980–81
8	Shawn Ray	65	2002–03
	Jibri Blount	65	2019–20
	Eric Boone	65	2022–23

Single game
Rk	Player	Steals	Season	Opponent
1	Jimmie Walker	10	1992–93	District of Columbia
2	Rashaun Madison	9	2015–16	Montreat
3	Raasean Davis	8	2018–19	Coastal Carolina
	Nicolas Fennell	8	2018–19	Christendom
	Drimir Ferguson	8	2012–13	Johnson & Wales

== Blocks ==
Career
Rk	Player	Blocks	Seasons
1	Derrick Leak	152	1986–87 1987–88 1988–89 1989–90
2	Adrian McKinnon	115	1985–86 1986–87 1987–88 1988–89
3	Jason Hervey	114	2003–04 2004–05 2006–07
4	Jimmy Boston	100	1997–98 1998–99 1999–00 2000–01
5	Dekendric Perry	85	1997–98 1999–00 2000–01 2001–02
6	Raasean Davis	77	2017–18 2018–19
7	Melvin Whitaker	73	2003–04
8	Nick Chasten	71	2008–09 2009–10 2010–11 2011–12
9	Jordan Parks	69	2013–14 2014–15
10	Jermond Debro	63	2001–02 2002–03 2003–04
	Shawn Ray	63	2000–01 2001–02 2002–03

Season
Rk	Player	Blocks	Season
1	Melvin Whitaker	73	2003–04
2	Adrian McKinnon	69	1988–89
3	Brendan Medley-Bacon	58	2022–23
4	Charles Murphy	54	1983–84
5	Derrick Leak	52	1986–87
6	Derrick Leak	49	1987–88
7	Kelechi Okworogwo	48	2025–26
8	Dekendric Perry	44	2000–01
9	Raasean Davis	42	2018–19
	Nate Maxey	42	2014–15

Single game
Rk	Player	Blocks	Season	Opponent
1	Brendan Medley-Bacon	8	2022–23	Howard
	Adrian McKinnon	8	1988–89	N.C. A&T
3	Brendan Medley-Bacon	7	2022–23	Delaware State
	Nate Maxey	7	2014–15	Barber-Scotia
	Adrian McKinnon	7	1988–89	Fayetteville State
6	Kyric Davis	6	2025–26	Morgan State
	Brendan Medley-Bacon	6	2022–23	Morgan State
	Melvin Whitaker	6	2003–04	Virginia Union
	Melvin Whitaker	6	2003–04	Johnson C. Smith
	Melvin Whitaker	6	2003–04	Winston-Salem St.
	Melvin Whitaker	6	2003–04	Elizabeth City St,
	Jermond Debro	6	2001–02	Catawba
