= Mel Blount =

American football player (born 1948)

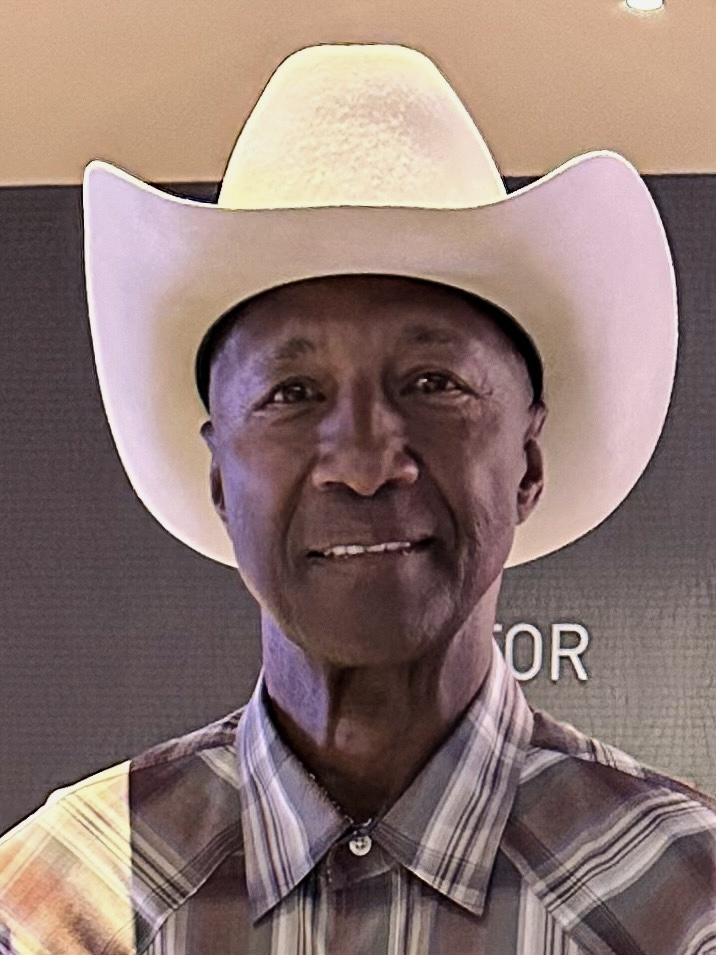
- Blount in 2025

No. 47
- Position: Cornerback

Personal information
- Born: April 10, 1948 (age 78); Vidalia, Georgia, U.S.
- Listed height: 6 ft 3 in (1.91 m)
- Listed weight: 205 lb (93 kg)

Career information
- High school: Lyons (Lyons, Georgia)
- College: Southern (1966–1969)
- NFL draft: 1970: 3rd round, 53rd overall pick

Career history
- Pittsburgh Steelers (1970–1983)

Awards and highlights
- 4× Super Bowl champion (IX, X, XIII, XIV); NFL Defensive Player of the Year (1975); 2× First-team All-Pro (1975, 1981); 4× Second-team All-Pro (1976–1979); 5× Pro Bowl (1975, 1976, 1978, 1979, 1981); NFL interceptions leader (1975); NFL 1980s All-Decade Team; NFL 75th Anniversary All-Time Team; NFL 100th Anniversary All-Time Team; Pittsburgh Steelers All-Time Team; Pittsburgh Steelers Hall of Honor

Career NFL statistics
- Interceptions: 57
- Interception yards: 736
- Touchdowns: 2
- Stats at Pro Football Reference
- Pro Football Hall of Fame

Melvin Cornell Blount (born April 10, 1948) is an American former professional football player who was a cornerback for the Pittsburgh Steelers of the National Football League (NFL) for fourteen seasons. A five-time Pro Bowler, he was inducted into the Pro Football Hall of Fame in 1989.

Blount played college football for the Southern Jaguars. He is considered one of the best cornerbacks to have ever played in the NFL. His physical style of play made him one of the most feared defensive backs in the game at a time when pass interference rules were less stringent. He founded the Mel Blount Youth Home.

== Early life and college ==
Blount was born in Toombs County, Georgia. The early years of his life were spent in poverty on a Georgia farm. Blount was a star in baseball, football, basketball, and track at Lyons High School. After graduation he was offered a scholarship to Southern University in Baton Rouge, Louisiana. While there he was a Pro-Scouts All-American pick as both safety and cornerback.

== Professional career ==
Blount was the prototype cornerback of his era and a significant reason why the Pittsburgh Steelers were the dominant team of the National Football League in the 1970s. He was a third-round draft choice of the Steelers in 1970. He had the size, speed, and quickness for the position, plus the toughness and mental ability to adjust his coverage tactics and excel despite rule changes that favored receivers.

A Pro-Scouts All-American as both a safety and cornerback at Southern, Blount became a starter in the Steelers secondary beginning in 1972. That season, he did not allow a single touchdown. Blount was equally effective playing either zone or man-to-man defense. Known for his rugged style of play, his specialty was the "bump-and-run" pass defense. Because of his size and speed, he physically overpowered pass receivers.

Midway through his career however, the rules regarding pass coverage were changed making such harassment of a receiver illegal. The rule would come to be named the Mel Blount Rule. Blount had 57 interceptions in his career; he returned them for 736 yards and two touchdowns. He intercepted at least one pass in all 14 NFL seasons and led the league in interceptions with 11 in 1975. Blount also was used as a kickoff returner early in his career. He totaled 36 returns for 911 yards and a 25.3-yard average. He also recovered 13 opponents' fumbles, two of which he returned for touchdowns.

Blount, who was named the NFL's most valuable defensive player in 1975 by the Associated Press, earned All-Pro acclaim in 1975, 1976, 1977, and 1981. He also was a four-time All-AFC selection and played in five Pro Bowls. His fumble recovery in the 1979 AFC Championship Game led to the Steelers' winning touchdown in a 27–13 victory over the Houston Oilers. Earlier in Super Bowl XIII Blount's interception began a Pittsburgh drive which resulted in a go-ahead touchdown in a 35–31 victory over the Dallas Cowboys.

== NFL career statistics ==
Legend
	AP NFL Defensive Player of the Year
	Won the Super Bowl
	Led the league
**Bold**	Career high

=== Regular season ===
Year	Team	Games		Interceptions					Fumbles			
Year	Team	GP	GS	Int	Yds	Y/I	Lng	TD	FR	Yds	Y/F	TD
1970	PIT	14	10	1	4	4.0	4	0	1	0	0.0	0
1971	PIT	14	10	2	16	8.0	16	0	0	0	—	0
1972	PIT	14	13	3	75	25.0	34	0	2	**35**	17.5	**1**
1973	PIT	14	14	4	82	20.5	24	0	2	0	0.0	0
1974	PIT	13	13	2	74	**37.0**	**52**	**1**	**3**	5	1.7	0
1975	PIT	14	14	**11**	**121**	11.0	47	0	0	0	—	0
1976	PIT	14	14	6	75	12.5	28	0	1	0	0.0	0
1977	PIT	14	13	6	65	10.8	37	0	1	15	15.0	0
1978	PIT	16	15	4	55	13.8	35	0	0	0	—	0
1979	PIT	16	16	3	1	0.3	1	0	1	15	15.0	0
1980	PIT	16	16	4	28	7.0	17	0	1	32	**32.0**	0
1981	PIT	16	16	6	106	17.7	50	**1**	0	0	—	0
1982	PIT	9	9	1	2	2.0	2	0	0	0	—	0
1983	PIT	16	16	4	32	8.0	21	0	1	3	3.0	**1**
Career		200	189	57	736	12.9	52	2	13	105	8.1	2

=== Postseason ===
Year	Team	Games		Interceptions					Fumbles			
Year	Team	GP	GS	Int	Yds	Y/I	Lng	TD	FR	Yds	Y/F	TD
1972	PIT	2	2	0	0	—	0	0	0	0	—	0
1973	PIT	1	1	0	0	—	0	0	0	0	—	0
1974	PIT	3	3	1	10	10.0	10	0	0	0	—	0
1975	PIT	3	3	1	20	**20.0**	**20**	0	0	0	—	0
1976	PIT	2	2	0	0	—	0	0	0	0	—	0
1978	PIT	3	3	**2**	**29**	14.5	16	0	0	0	—	0
1979	PIT	3	3	0	0	—	0	0	**1**	**5**	**5.0**	0
1982	PIT	1	1	0	0	—	0	0	**1**	0	0.0	0
1983	PIT	1	1	0	0	—	0	0	0	0	—	0
Career		19	19	4	59	14.8	20	0	2	5	2.5	0

== After the NFL ==
Following his football career, Blount became Director of Player Relations for the NFL, serving in the position from 1983 to 1990. He also became active in charity work. He founded the Mel Blount Youth Home, a shelter and Christian mission for victims of child abuse and neglect in Toombs County, Georgia in 1983. In 1989, he opened a second youth home in Claysville, Pennsylvania, near Pittsburgh. The Mel Blount Youth Home was investigated for the use of corporal punishment in the 1990s.

== Legacy ==
In 1989, Blount was inducted into the Pro Football Hall of Fame and the Louisiana Sports Hall of Fame. He was inducted in the Georgia Sports Hall of Fame in 1990 and the Black College Football Hall of Fame in 2011. In 1994, he was named to the NFL's 75th anniversary All-Time team. In 1999, he was ranked number 36 on The Sporting News' list of the 100 Greatest Football Players. In 2019, he was named to the NFL 100th Anniversary All Time Team and was one of only ten defensive players to be selected unanimously.

Blount has two daughters, Shuntel and Tanisia, and five sons: Norris, Dedrick, Akil, Jibri, and Khalid.

His son Akil played college football at Florida A&M and was signed as an undrafted free agent by the Miami Dolphins. Jibri played college basketball at Cleveland State before transferring to play for North Carolina Central University. His youngest son, Khalid Blount, is a football player who was ranked as a two-star recruit by Rivals before attending Duquesne University.

Blount currently resides in Buffalo Township, on a 303-acre (1.23 km^{2}) farm that includes the site of his former youth home.
