= DeLloyd Thompson =

American aviator (1888-1949)

- Born: 1888; Buffalo Township, Pennsylvania, U.S.
- Died: 1949

DeLloyd "Dutch" Thompson (1888 – 1949) was an aviator of the early 20th century.

He was born in 1888 and grew up in Buffalo Township, Pennsylvania. As a pilot, he was part of the tradition of "exhibition" pilots, travelling throughout countrysides and entertaining with their aeronautical feats.

On August 6, 1914, Thompson set the flight altitude record by flying to a height of 15,256 feet (4,650 m) over Overland Park, Kansas in his Day-Gyro plane. Because of the coldness at that altitude, he wore a sheepskin suit. When the plane ran out of fuel, he executed a spiral glide maneuver to return to earth. This feat, which placed him at the altitude of modern turboprop planes, happened only 10 years after the Wright brothers' first flight. However, because of the advances in flight technology, the record did not last long.

In 1916, during the run-up to American involvement in World War I, he tried to raise American awareness of the aerial warfare and to encourage greater protections for the East Coast, by launching pyrotechnics over Washington, D.C. . He dropped packets reading, "This 'Bomb' is Harmless. Suppose it had contained Nitro-Glycerine and was hurled by the enemy instead of by DeLloyd Thompson, who flies the American Flag? WAKE UP AND PREPARE"

That same year, he broke the air speed record over Long Island by traveling 108.4 mph. He was the second American to loop an airplane. He invented the undertaker's drop, a famous airplane maneuver. He was the second aviator in the world to sky-write with an airplane.

In 1937, developed and constructed the DeLloydCabinaire, a 2 seat monoplane, but that venture failed, due in part to the continuing Great Depression, and only 2 were ever built. That year, his last flight was a demonstration of that plane.

Following his aeronautical career, he made an unsuccessful bid to become mayor of Washington, Pennsylvania in 1939. He also became the owner of a coal mine and worked as a construction contractor He was in an automobile accident on U.S. Route 40 in Pennsylvania 1945. He died in Washington 1949 from heart failure.

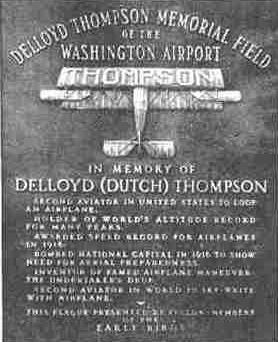
The plaque, created by Early Birds of Aviation, which was installed at the Washington County Airport in 1949.

On July 13, 1949, the DeLloyd Thompson Memorial Gates were dedicated at the Washington County Airport. The event, which was attended by 5,000, was marked with an airshow conducted by the Early Birds of Aviation.

Eventually, the grounds of the airport outgrew the gates. In 1969, the plates from the gate were refurbished and airport administration building. However, the plates were removed from the grounds, and were at risk of being sold for scrap before being rescued by Margaret Thompson, DeLloyd's daughter-in-law. They eventually were placed in the custody of the Washington County Historical Society at the F. Julius LeMoyne House. In 2013 and 2014, Clay Kilgore, executive director of the Washington County Historical Society, led an effort to restore the plaques to the airport.

== See also ==
- 1914 in aviation
- Early Birds of Aviation
