= Saints John Neumann and Maria Goretti High School =

Catholic school in Philadelphia, Pennsylvania, United States

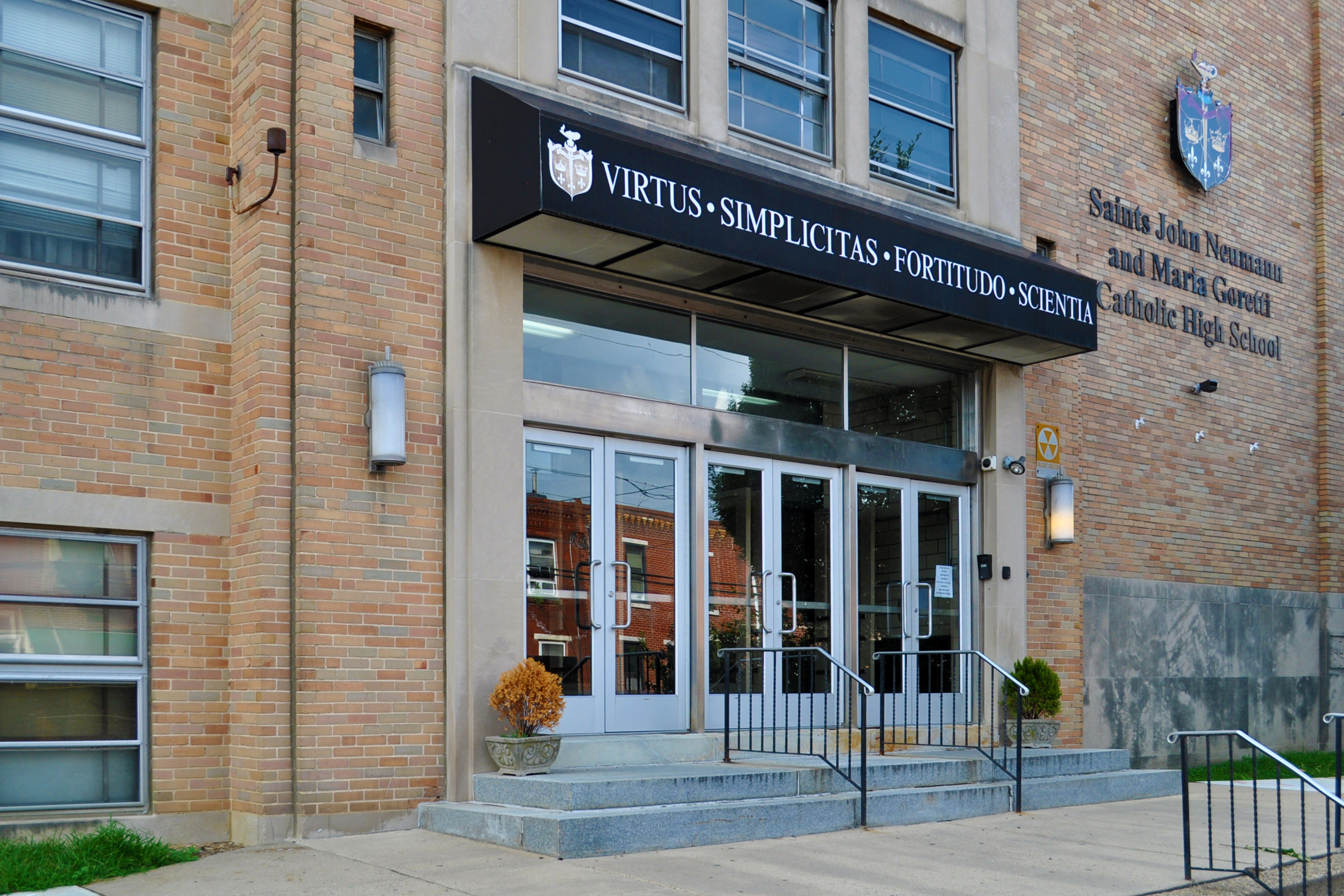
- Saints John Neumann and Maria Goretti Catholic High School, 1736 S. 10th St. Philadelphia PA 19148

Location
- 1736 South Tenth Street; Philadelphia, Pennsylvania 19148; United States; 39°55′38″N 75°9′45″W

Information
- Other name: Saints Neumann Goretti High School, Neumann Goretti
- Type: Private, Catholic, college preparatory
- Motto: Virtus, Simpliticus, Fortitudo, et Scientia (Virtue, Simplicity, Strength, and Knowledge)
- Religious affiliation: Roman Catholic
- Patron saints: John Neumann and Maria Goretti
- Established: 1934 (Neumann); 1955 (Goretti)
- Oversight: Archdiocese of Philadelphia
- Superintendent: Nancy Kurz (interim)
- President: Mr. Tim Cairy
- Rector: Nelson J. Perez
- Principal: Ms. Kim Eife
- Grades: 9–12
- Campus: Urban
- Colors: Vegas Gold and Black
- Slogan: Compassion, Courage, Commitment
- Athletics conference: Philadelphia Catholic League
- Sports: basketball, baseball, cheerleading, cross country, football, soccer, softball, track & field, volleyball
- Mascot: "Duke"
- Nickname: NG
- Team name: Saints
- Rival: Roman Catholic, Archbishop Wood, Archbishop Carroll, St Joes Prep
- Accreditation: Middle States Association of Colleges and Schools
- Newspaper: The Scribe
- Yearbook: The Crystal
- Tuition: $10,375
- Communities served: Philadelphia, with a focus on South Philadelphia
- Feeder schools: Our Lady of Hope School, St. Anthony of Padua School, St. Monica
- Alumni: 35,000+
- Website: neumanngorettihs.org

Saints John Neumann and Maria Goretti High School, sometimes shortened to Saints Neumann Goretti High School or simply Neumann Goretti, is a private Catholic high school located in the South Philadelphia section of Philadelphia, Pennsylvania. It is operated by the Archdiocese of Philadelphia.

The school was founded in 2004 by a merger of the all-boys Saint John Neumann High School, established in 1934, and all-girls Saint Maria Goretti High School, established in 1955. The school is located in the former Goretti campus.

== History ==
=== Pre-merger ===
==== Saint John Neumann High School ====
Saint John Neumann High School was an all-male Roman Catholic high school located in South Philadelphia. Southeast Catholic High School opened at the intersection of Seventh Street and Christian Street in 1934. The school became Bishop Neumann High School, after John Neumann, in 1955. In March of the following year the school moved to 2600 Moore Street, its last location. In August 1978 the school became St. John Neumann High School to reflect Neumann's canonization. In 1992 Neumann had 853 students.

The former Neumann campus became St. John Neumann Place, a housing development for senior citizens.

==== Saint Maria Goretti High School ====
Saint Maria Goretti High School was an all-female Roman Catholic high school located at 1736 South Tenth Street in South Philadelphia. Goretti opened in 1955. In 1992, Goretti had 970 students.

=== Merger ===
In October 1992 consultants told the archdiocese that Neumann and Goretti should be consolidated onto Neumann's site. By December of that year the archdiocese decided not to consolidate the two schools. In 2003 Neumann had 608 students, while Goretti had 683 students. By then the combined populations of both schools declined by 29 percent in an 11-year span. In March 2003 the archdiocese asked the faculty and staff of Neumann to consider merging or closing the school as the school had increasing deficits and a decreasing student population; Goretti had a stable financial situation. In June of that year the committees unanimously requested a merge. In September of that year Cardinal Anthony Bevilacqua, the Archbishop of Philadelphia, decided that the merge should occur.

=== Post-merger ===
In 2005, most of the students at Neumann Goretti came from South Philadelphia. During the first school year Neumann Goretti used the Neumann athletic fields.

== Notable alumni ==
- Christian Barmore, American football player
- Jerry Blavat, radio personality
- Mark Calvi, baseball coach (St. John Neumann)
- Frank DiMichele, baseball player
- Eric Gentry, American football player
- Quade Green, basketball player
- Christian Ings, basketball player
- Rick Jackson, basketball player
- Scoop Jardine, basketball player
- Diamond Johnson, basketball player
- Josh Ockimey, baseball player
- June Olkowski, basketball coach (St. Maria Goretti)
- Kamiah Smalls (2016), basketball player
