= Mel Blount Youth Home =

Youth home in Pennsylvania, United States

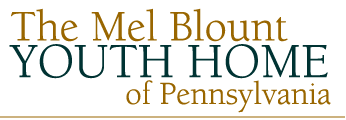
- Founded: 1990
- Founder: Mel Blount
- Type: Public charity
- Location: Buffalo Township, Washington County, Pennsylvania
- Region served: Western Pennsylvania
- Key people: Mel Blount
- Website: www.mbyh.org

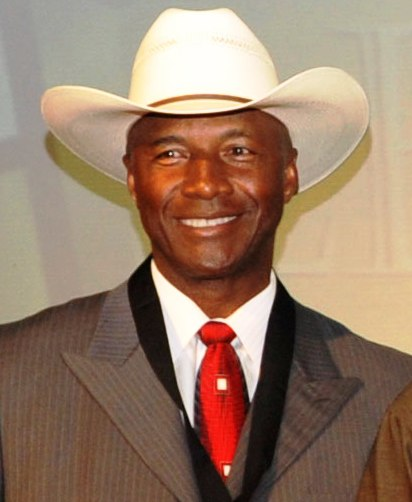
The founder, 4-time Super Bowl champion and Pro Football Hall of Fame member, Mel Blount.

The Mel Blount Youth Home was a youth home for boys located in Buffalo Township, Washington County, Pennsylvania. It is located on 246 acres of farmland near Claysville, Pennsylvania. Students attend nearby McGuffey School District. Blount hosts an annual All Star Celebrity Roast, featuring many of his former Pittsburgh Steelers teammates, as a fundraiser.

Blount experienced a difficult process in securing zoning approval from the Buffalo Township Supervisors. Opponents of Blount's plan claimed that the boys posed a threat to the community. The opposition centered on a "Concerned Citizens" group and the local chapter of the Ku Klux Klan. Incidents began with flyers being circulated, eventually growing to shots being fired into the home the day before Blount's 1989 induction into the Pro Football Hall of Fame. During his induction speech, he specifically cited the racist attitudes of some in the community and Buffalo Township Supervisors. Later, 2 men from Claysville were arrested in connection to the shooting. While the zoning application was pending, the Klan announced that they would be holding a "standard rally" in protest, including a "cross-lighting ceremony." A Township Supervisor said that the Klansmen did not represent the community, and that they had come from outside of the community. The announcement spurred local labor groups, NAACP, and State Representative Leo Trich to hold counter-protest. In the end, the youth home was completed in early 1990.

During the 1990s, questions arose about the use of corporal punishment at the youth home, leading to an investigation by Allegheny County, Pennsylvania officials.

After 2014, the home was no longer used for long-term residence. Currently it hosts weekend and day camp programs.
