= Levi Wilson Tavern =

Historic tavern in Pennsylvania, United States

- U.S. National Register of Historic Places
- Washington County History & Landmarks Foundation Landmark
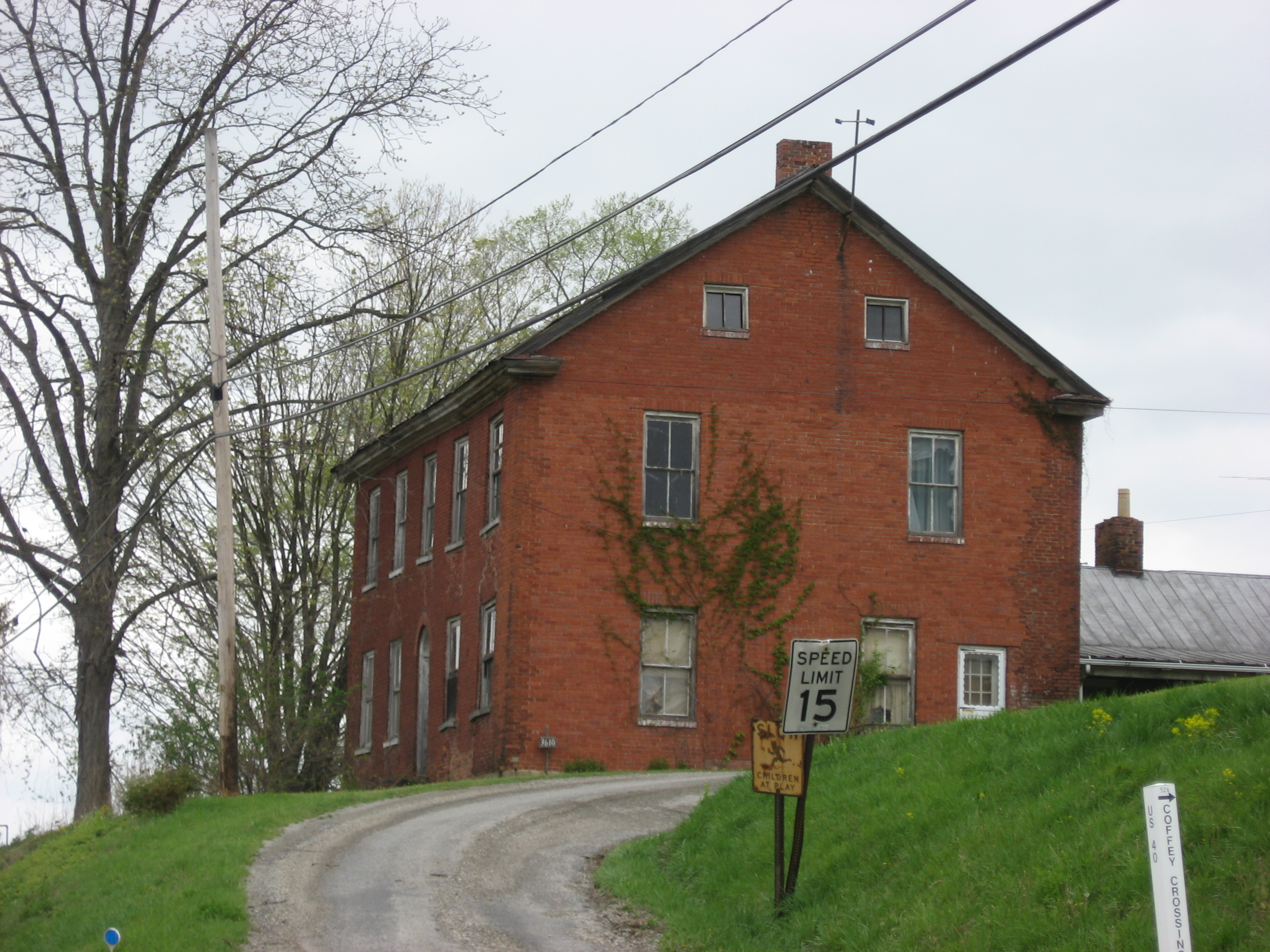

- Location within Pennsylvania Location within the United States
- Location: US 40, 1.5 mi. E of S Bridge, Buffalo Township, Pennsylvania
- Coordinates: 40°9′0″N 80°19′44″W
- Area: Less than one acre
- Built: 1816
- Architectural style: Federal
- MPS: National Road in Pennsylvania MPS
- NRHP reference No.: 96001210
- Added to NRHP: April 15, 1996

Levi Wilson Tavern is a historic building in Buffalo Township, Pennsylvania

It is designated as a historic residential landmark/farmstead by the Washington County History & Landmarks Foundation.

== See also ==
- National Register of Historic Places listings in Washington County, Pennsylvania
