= 2022–23 Coppin State Eagles men's basketball team =

American college basketball season

2022–23 Coppin State Eagles men's basketball
- Conference: Mid-Eastern Athletic Conference
- Record: 9–23 (4–10 MEAC)
- Head coach: Juan Dixon (6th season)
- Associate head coach: John Auslander
- Assistant coach: Kent Auslander
- Home arena: Physical Education Complex

2022–23 MEAC men's basketball standings
	Conf.				Overall
Team	W		L	PCT	W		L	PCT
Howard †	11	–	3	.786	22	–	13	.629
North Carolina Central	10	–	4	.714	18	–	12	.600
Norfolk State	9	–	5	.643	22	–	11	.667
Maryland Eastern Shore	9	–	5	.643	18	–	13	.581
Morgan State	7	–	7	.500	15	–	16	.484
Coppin State	4	–	10	.286	9	–	23	.281
Delaware State	4	–	10	.286	6	–	24	.200
South Carolina State	2	–	12	.143	5	–	26	.161
† 2023 MEAC tournament winner

The 2022–23 Coppin State Eagles men's basketball team represented Coppin State University in the 2022–23 NCAA Division I men's basketball season. The Eagles, led by sixth-year head coach Juan Dixon, played their home games at the Physical Education Complex in Baltimore, Maryland as members of the Mid-Eastern Athletic Conference (MEAC). They finished the season 9–23, 4–10 in MEAC play, to finish in a tie for sixth place. They lost to Norfolk State in the quarterfinals of the MEAC tournament.

On March 21, 2023, the school fired head coach Juan Dixon. On May 5, the school named Coppin State alum and Maryland Eastern Shore assistant coach Larry Stewart the team's new head coach.

== Previous season ==
The Eagles finished the 2021–22 season 9–22, 6–8 in MEAC play, to finish tied for sixth place. As the No. 7 seed, they upset No. 2 seed Howard and No. 3 seed North Carolina Central to clinch a spot in the MEAC tournament championship, their first such appearance since 2008. Unlike that prior title appearance, they were unable to win, losing to top-seeded Norfolk State.

== Roster ==
2022–23 Coppin State Eagles men's basketball team
Players
Coaches

Pos.	#	Name	Height	Weight	Year	Previous school	Hometown
G	0	Malik Battle	6 ft 3 in (1.91 m)	170 lb (77 kg)	RS Jr	South Georgia Tech	Douglasville, GA
G/F	1	Justin Steers	6 ft 7 in (2.01 m)	205 lb (93 kg)	RS Sr	Greater Hope Christian Academy	Philadelphia, PA
G	2	Mike Hood	6 ft 2 in (1.88 m)	195 lb (88 kg)	RS Sr	Montana State	Kansas City, MO
G	3	Sam Sessoms	6 ft 0 in (1.83 m)	189 lb (86 kg)	RS Sr	Penn State	Philadelphia, PA
G	4	Nendah Tarke	6 ft 4 in (1.93 m)	200 lb (91 kg)	RS So	Bullis School	Gaithersburg, MD
G	5	Greg Spurlock	6 ft 5 in (1.96 m)	196 lb (89 kg)	So	Rock Ridge High School	Ashburn, VA
G	10	Kam'Ron Blue	6 ft 7 in (2.01 m)	205 lb (93 kg)	RS Sr	Fordham	Greenville, South Carolina
G	11	CJ Scott	6 ft 4 in (1.93 m)	195 lb (88 kg)	Fr	Archbishop Spalding High School	Severn, MD
G	13	Alex Rojas	6 ft 5 in (1.96 m)	210 lb (95 kg)	RS Jr	New Mexico Junior College	Gaithersburg, MD
G	20	Christian Sutton	6 ft 3 in (1.91 m)	193 lb (88 kg)	GS	American	Atlanta, GA
F	24	Daniel Titus	6 ft 8 in (2.03 m)	210 lb (95 kg)	RS Jr	Neosho County Community College	Sydney, Australia
G	25	Isaiah Gross	6 ft 4 in (1.93 m)	210 lb (95 kg)	RS So	Eleanor Roosevelt High School	Lanham, MD
F	33	Luka Tekavcic	6 ft 11 in (2.11 m)	200 lb (91 kg)	So	Oral Roberts	Grosuplje, Slovenia
F	35	Justin Winston	6 ft 8 in (2.03 m)	220 lb (100 kg)	Sr	Robert Morris	West Orange, NJ

Head coach

- Juan Dixon (Maryland)

Assistant coach(es)

- John Auslander (Maryland)
- Kent Auslander (Coppin State)

Legend

- (C) Team captain
- (S) Suspended
- (I) Ineligible
- (W) Walk-on
- Injured
- Current redshirt

Roster
Last update: November 7, 2022

== Schedule and results ==
Date time, TV	Rank^{#}	Opponent^{#}	Result	Record	Site (attendance) city, state
Non-conference regular season
November 7, 2022*; 6:00 p.m., ESPN+		at Charlotte	L 59–82	0–1	Dale F. Halton Arena (2,638); Charlotte, NC
November 8, 2022*; 8:30 p.m., FS1		at Georgetown	L 89–99 ^{OT}	0–2	Capital One Arena (7,125); Washington, D.C.
November 11, 2022*; 7:00 p.m.		Mount St. Mary's	W 83–78	1–2	Physical Education Complex (612); Baltimore, MD
November 14, 2022*; 7:00 p.m.		Navy	W 75–68	2–2	Physical Education Complex (1,118); Baltimore, MD
November 17, 2022*; 8:30 p.m., ESPN+		at Tennessee Tech; Marshall/Tennessee Tech MTE	W 90–85	3–2	Eblen Center (1,166); Cookeville, TN
November 19, 2022*; 7:00 p.m., ESPN+		at Marshall; Marshall/Tennessee Tech MTE	L 67–86	3–3	Cam Henderson Center (3,625); Huntington, WV
November 22, 2022*; 7:00 p.m., NBCSWA/FloHoops		at Towson	L 67–83	3–4	SECU Arena (1,732); Towson, MD
November 25, 2022*; 4:00 p.m., BTN+		at No. 23 Maryland	L 79–95	3–5	Xfinity Center (10,902); College Park, MD
November 30, 2022*; 7:00 p.m., ESPN+		at UMBC	L 82–109	3–6	Chesapeake Employers Insurance Arena (1,475); Catonsville, MD
December 3, 2022*; 5:00 p.m., ESPN+		at Loyola (MD)	W 74–71	4–6	Reitz Arena (807); Baltimore, MD
December 6, 2022*; 7:00 p.m., ACCNX		at NC State	L 72–94	4–7	Reynolds Coliseum (5,500); Raleigh, NC
December 11, 2022*; 2:00 p.m., ESPN+		at East Carolina	L 75–84	4–8	Williams Arena (3,247); Greenville, NC
December 13, 2022*; 6:00 p.m., ESPN+		at George Washington	L 71–83	4–9	Charles E. Smith Center (808); Washington, D.C.
December 21, 2022*; 7:00 p.m.		James Madison	W 107–100 ^{2OT}	5–9	Physical Education Complex (3,378); Baltimore, MD
December 23, 2022*; 4:00 p.m., ESPN+		at George Mason	L 53–91	5–10	EagleBank Arena (3,011); Fairfax, VA
December 28, 2022*; 7:00 p.m., ESPN+		at Richmond	L 65–83	5–11	Robins Center (6,007); Richmond, VA
December 30, 2022*; 8:00 p.m., BTN		at Rutgers	L 57–90	5–12	Jersey Mike's Arena (8,000); Piscataway, NJ
MEAC regular season
January 7, 2023; 4:00 p.m.		South Carolina State	W 85–73	6–12 (1–0)	Physical Education Complex (214); Baltimore, MD
January 9, 2023; 7:30 p.m.		North Carolina Central	L 59–64	6–13 (1–1)	Physical Education Complex (317); Baltimore, MD
January 14, 2023; 4:00 p.m.		Morgan State	L 66–83	6–14 (1–2)	Physical Education Complex (1,717); Baltimore, MD
January 21, 2023; 4:00 p.m.		Norfolk State	L 65–96	6–15 (1–3)	Physical Education Complex (516); Baltimore, MD
January 23, 2023; 7:30 p.m.		at Howard	L 76–90	6–16 (1–4)	Burr Gymnasium (2,138); Washington, D.C.
January 28, 2023; 4:00 p.m.		at Maryland Eastern Shore	L 75–94	6–17 (1–5)	Hytche Athletic Center (1,033); Princess Anne, MD
January 30, 2023; 7:30 p.m.		Delaware State	L 66–71	6–18 (1–6)	Physical Education Complex (791); Baltimore, MD
February 11, 2023; 4:00 p.m.		at South Carolina State	L 84–94	6–19 (1–7)	SHM Memorial Center (522); Orangeburg, SC
February 13, 2023; 7:30 p.m.		at North Carolina Central	L 52–85	6–20 (1–8)	McDougald–McLendon Arena (3,173); Durham, NC
February 18, 2023; 4:00 p.m.		Howard	L 70–80	6–21 (1–9)	Physical Education Complex (2,106); Baltimore, MD
February 20, 2023; 7:30 p.m.		at Norfolk State	W 69–62	7–21 (2–9)	Joseph G. Echols Memorial Hall (2,686); Norfolk, VA
February 25, 2023; 4:00 p.m.		Maryland Eastern Shore	L 57–78	7–22 (2–10)	Physical Education Complex (676); Baltimore, MD
February 27, 2023; 7:30 p.m.		at Delaware State	W 82–72	8–22 (3–10)	Memorial Hall (1,254); Dover, DE
March 2, 2023; 7:30 p.m.		at Morgan State	W 77–65	9–22 (4–10)	Talmadge L. Hill Field House (1,172); Baltimore, MD
MEAC tournament
March 9, 2022; 8:00 p.m., ESPN+	(6)	vs. (3) Norfolk State; Quarterfinals	L 56–73	9–23	Norfolk Scope; Norfolk, VA
*Non-conference game. ^{#}Rankings from AP poll. (#) Tournament seedings in parentheses. All times are in Eastern.
