= Washington County Airport (Pennsylvania) =

Airport in Pennsylvania, US

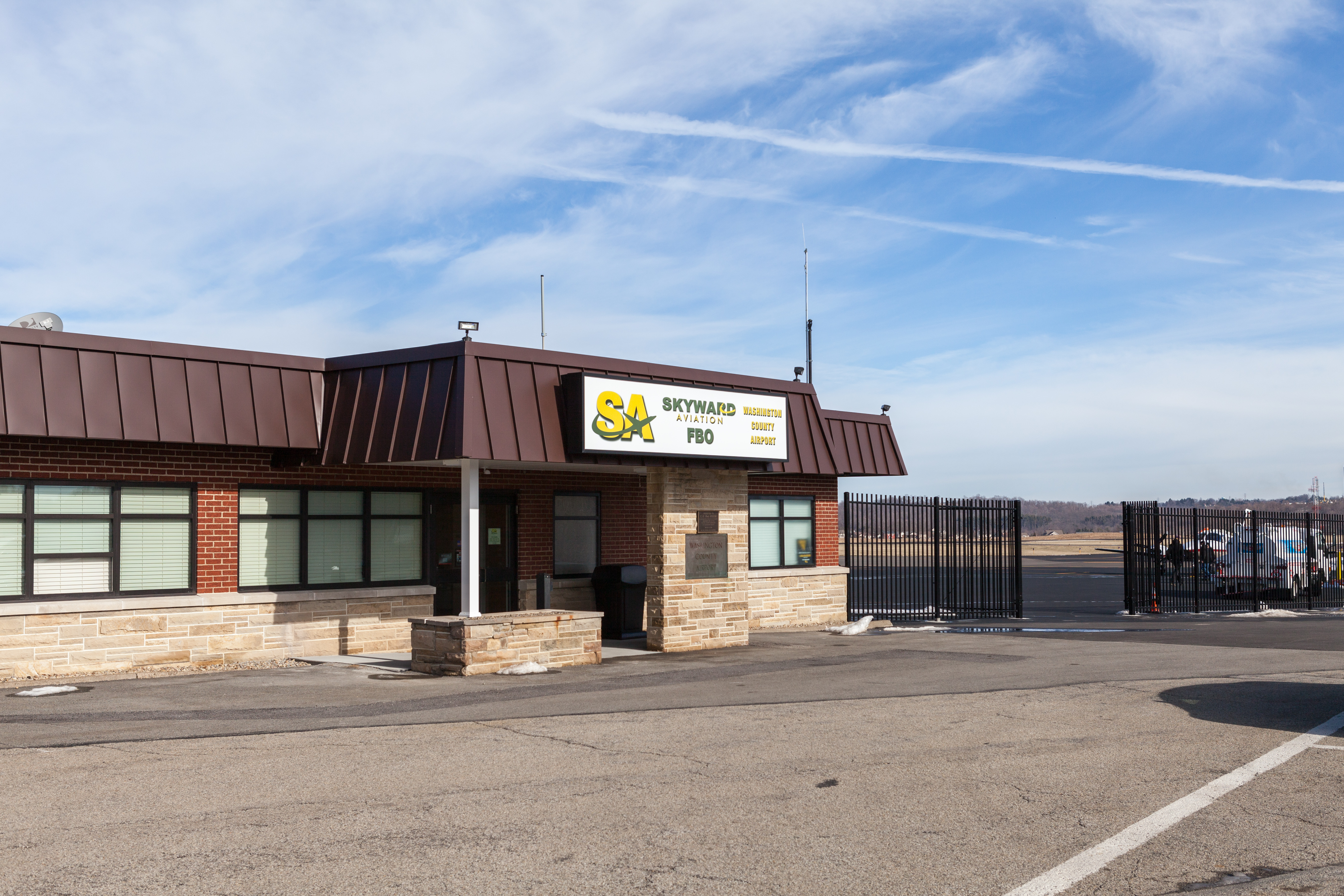
- IATA: WSG; ICAO: KAFJ; FAA LID: AFJ

Summary
- Airport type: Public
- Owner: Washington County
- Location: Washington, Pennsylvania, U.S.
- Elevation AMSL: 1,184 ft / 361 m
- Coordinates: 40°08′11″N 080°17′25″W
- Website: http://www.washingtoncountyairport.com/
- Interactive map of Washington County Airport

Runways
Direction	Length		Surface
Direction	ft	m	Surface
9/27	5,004	1,525	Asphalt

Statistics (2006)
- Aircraft operations: 40,017
- Based aircraft: 94
- Source: Federal Aviation Administration

Washington County Airport (IATA: WSG, ICAO: KAFJ, FAA LID: AFJ) is three miles (5 km) southwest of Washington in South Franklin Township, Pennsylvania. It is owned and operated by Washington County and is in the Greater Pittsburgh metropolitan area.

Most U.S. airports use the same three-letter location identifier for the FAA and IATA, but Washington County Airport is AFJ to the FAA and WSG to the IATA.

At one time, it hosted memorials for DeLloyd Thompson, a famous early pilot from Washington County, but those memorials had been discarded. In 2013 and 2014, Clay Kilgore, executive director of the Washington County Historical Society, led an effort to restore the plaques to the airport.

== Facilities ==
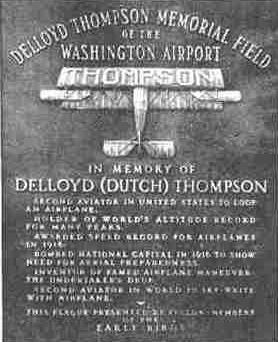
The plaque honoring DeLloyd Thompson created by Early Birds of Aviation, which was installed at the Washington County Airport in 1949

The airport covers 365 acres (1.48 km^{2}) and has 37 T-hangars, seven corporate hangars and seven businesses that employ about thirty people. The airport is a relief airport for other airports such as Pittsburgh International Airport and Allegheny County Airport.

Washington County Airport has a 5,004 feet (1,525 m) runway and a full parallel taxiway system lit for night operations. It has a partial electronic guidance system consisting of a Localizer, Distance Measuring Equipment and a Non-directional beacon. The non-precision approach is available as well. The airport also has a Remote Communications Outlet and an Automated Surface Observing System. The first Instrument Landing System (ILS) approved by the Federal Aviation Administration was added in 2003.

The airport is home to 94 aircraft: 70 single-engine, 17 multi-engine, five jets and two helicopters. The airport sees about 110 operations per day. Roughly 60% of Washington County Airport's traffic is local general aviation while 24% is general transportation. 17% of the operations are air charter while less than 1% is military use.

== See also ==
- List of airports in Pennsylvania
