= 2022–23 Delaware State Hornets men's basketball team =

American college basketball season

2022–23 Delaware State Hornets men's basketball
- Conference: Mid-Eastern Athletic Conference
- Record: 6–24 (4–10 MEAC)
- Head coach: Stan Waterman (2nd season)
- Assistant coaches: Horace Owens; Vernon Dupree Jr.; Shahid Perkins
- Home arena: Memorial Hall

2022–23 MEAC men's basketball standings
	Conf.				Overall
Team	W		L	PCT	W		L	PCT
Howard †	11	–	3	.786	22	–	13	.629
North Carolina Central	10	–	4	.714	18	–	12	.600
Norfolk State	9	–	5	.643	22	–	11	.667
Maryland Eastern Shore	9	–	5	.643	18	–	13	.581
Morgan State	7	–	7	.500	15	–	16	.484
Coppin State	4	–	10	.286	9	–	23	.281
Delaware State	4	–	10	.286	6	–	24	.200
South Carolina State	2	–	12	.143	5	–	26	.161
† 2023 MEAC tournament winner

The 2022–23 Delaware State Hornets men's basketball team represented Delaware State University in the 2022–23 NCAA Division I men's basketball season. The Hornets, led by second-year head coach Stan Waterman, played their home games at Memorial Hall in Dover, Delaware as members of the Mid-Eastern Athletic Conference.

== Previous season ==
The Hornets finished the 2021–22 season 2–25, 0–14 in MEAC play to finish at last place. As the No. 8 seed, they were defeated by top seed Norfolk State in the quarterfinals of the MEAC tournament.

== Roster ==
2022–23 Delaware State Hornets men's basketball team
Players
Coaches

Pos.	#	Name	Height	Weight	Year	Hometown
G	0	Arion Lewis	6 ft 3 in (1.91 m)	175 lb (79 kg)	Jr	Philadelphia, Pennsylvania
G/F	1	Kareem Ewell	6 ft 7 in (2.01 m)	205 lb (93 kg)	Fr	Wilmington, Delaware
G	2	Corey Perkins	6 ft 2 in (1.88 m)	185 lb (84 kg)	So	Wilmington, Delaware
G	3	Martaz Robinson	6 ft 2 in (1.88 m)	180 lb (82 kg)	Jr	Baltimore, Maryland
F	4	Kyle Johnson	6 ft 8 in (2.03 m)	190 lb (86 kg)	GS	San Diego, California
G	5	Jevin Muniz	6 ft 6 in (1.98 m)	215 lb (98 kg)	Fr	Bethlehem, Pennsylvania
F	10	Ronald Lucas	6 ft 6 in (1.98 m)	200 lb (91 kg)	Sr	Baltimore, Maryland
G	11	Khyrie Staten	6 ft 1 in (1.85 m)	160 lb (73 kg)	So	Baltimore, Maryland
G/F	13	Ricky Deadwyler III	6 ft 4 in (1.93 m)	205 lb (93 kg)	So	Wilmington, Delaware
G	15	Aaron Lemon-Warren	6 ft 5 in (1.96 m)	220 lb (100 kg)	Fr	Philadelphia, Pennsylvania
F	20	Cameron Stitt	6 ft 8 in (2.03 m)	205 lb (93 kg)	So	Charlotte, North Carolina
G/F	21	Abdul Shanunu	6 ft 6 in (1.98 m)	220 lb (100 kg)	Jr	Accra, Ghana
G	22	Cory Barnes	6 ft 2 in (1.88 m)	210 lb (95 kg)	So	Milton, Delaware
F	23	Brandon Stone	6 ft 11 in (2.11 m)	210 lb (95 kg)	Sr	Alverton, Pennsylvania
C	24	Raymond Somerville	6 ft 11 in (2.11 m)	235 lb (107 kg)	RS So	Media, Pennsylvania

Head coach

- Stan Waterman (Delaware)

Assistant coach(es)

- Horace Owens (Rhode Island)
- Vernon Dupree Jr. (Wilmington)
- Shahid Perkins (East Tennessee State)

Legend

- (C) Team captain
- (S) Suspended
- (I) Ineligible
- (W) Walk-on
- Injured
- Current redshirt

Roster
Last update: November 26, 2022

== Schedule and results ==
Date time, TV	Rank^{#}	Opponent^{#}	Result	Record	Site (attendance) city, state
Exhibition
November 3, 2022*; 7:00 pm		Gwynedd Mercy	W 77–39	–	Memorial Hall (785); Dover, DE
Regular season
November 7, 2022*; 9:00 pm, ACCNX		at Virginia Tech	L 57–95	0–1	Cassell Coliseum (7,899); Blacksburg, VA
November 10, 2022*; 7:00 pm		Immaculata	W 104–67	1–1	Memorial Hall (573); Dover, DE
November 14, 2022*; 6:30 pm, FS2		at Villanova	L 50–60	1–2	Finneran Pavilion (6,501); Villanova, PA
November 16, 2022*; 7:00 pm, ESPN+		at Columbia	L 65–70	1–3	Levien Gymnasium (571); New York, NY
November 20, 2022*; 5:00 pm, FS1		at No. 25 UConn	L 60–95	1–4	XL Center (9,442); Hartford, CT
November 26, 2022*; 5:00 pm		at Liberty	L 53–80	1–5	Liberty Arena (3,081); Lynchburg, VA
November 30, 2022*; 7:30 pm		at St. Francis Brooklyn	L 73–81	1–6	Pratt ARC (183); Brooklyn, NY
December 3, 2022*; 3:00 pm		Longwood	L 49–75	1–7	Memorial Hall (767); Dover, DE
December 7, 2022*; 7:00 pm		at Delaware	L 69–75	1–8	Bob Carpenter Center (2,260); Newark, DE
December 10, 2022*; 2:00 pm		Georgian Court	L 69–75	1–9	Memorial Hall (526); Dover, DE
December 17, 2022*; 2:00 pm, FloHoops		at Drexel	L 52–85	1–10	Daskalakis Athletic Center (977); Philadelphia, PA
December 20, 2022*; 6:00 pm		Wagner	L 51–58	1–11	Memorial Hall; Dover, DE
December 29, 2022*; 2:00 pm, BTN+		at Penn State	L 46–60	1–12	Bryce Jordan Center (5,454); University Park, PA
January 7, 2023; 4:00 pm		at Howard	L 64–84	1–13 (0–1)	Burr Gymnasium (898); Washington, D.C.
January 9, 2023; 7:30 pm		Norfolk State	L 65–78	1–14 (0–2)	Memorial Hall (1,750); Dover, DE
January 14, 2023; 4:00 pm		at Maryland Eastern Shore	L 66–68	1–15 (0–3)	Hytche Athletic Center (799); Princess Anne, MD
January 21, 2023; 4:00 pm		at North Carolina Central	L 55–74	1–16 (0–4)	McDougald–McLendon Arena (2,669); Durham, NC
January 23, 2023; 7:30 pm		at South Carolina State	W 88–85 ^{OT}	2–16 (1–4)	SHM Memorial Center (425); Orangeburg, SC
January 28, 2023; 4:00 pm		Morgan State	W 64–62	3–16 (2–4)	Memorial Hall (1,174); Dover, DE
January 30, 2023; 7:30 pm		at Coppin State	W 71–66	4–16 (3–4)	Physical Education Complex (791); Baltimore, MD
February 4, 2023*; 1:00 pm, TNT		vs. Morgan State; HBCU Legacy Invitational	L 65–75	4–17	Prudential Center; Newark, NJ
February 7, 2023*; 7:00 pm		Chicago State	W 66–60	5–17	Memorial Hall (975); Dover, DE
February 11, 2023; 4:00 pm		Howard	L 85–86 ^{OT}	5–18 (3–5)	Memorial Hall (1,347); Dover, DE
February 13, 2023; 7:30 pm		at Norfolk State	L 58–97	5–19 (3–6)	Joseph G. Echols Memorial Hall (2,011); Norfolk, VA
February 18, 2023; 4:00 pm		North Carolina Central	L 58–66	5–20 (3–7)	Memorial Hall (1,507); Dover, DE
February 20, 2023; 7:30 pm		South Carolina State	W 69–68	6–20 (4–7)	Memorial Hall (1,137); Dover, DE
February 25, 2023; 4:00 pm		at Morgan State	L 78–83	6–21 (4–8)	Talmadge L. Hill Field House (872); Baltimore, MD
February 27, 2023; 7:30 pm		Coppin State	L 72–82	6–22 (4–9)	Memorial Hall (1,254); Dover, DE
March 2, 2023; 7:30 pm		Maryland Eastern Shore	L 58–64	6–23 (4–10)	Memorial Hall (1,263); Dover, DE
MEAC tournament
March 8, 2022; 8:00 pm, ESPN+	(7)	vs. (2) North Carolina Central; Quarterfinals	L 59–89	6–24	Norfolk Scope; Norfolk, VA
*Non-conference game. ^{#}Rankings from AP Poll. (#) Tournament seedings in parentheses. All times are in Eastern.
