= 2022–23 Morgan State Bears basketball team =

American college basketball season

2022–23 Morgan State Bears basketball
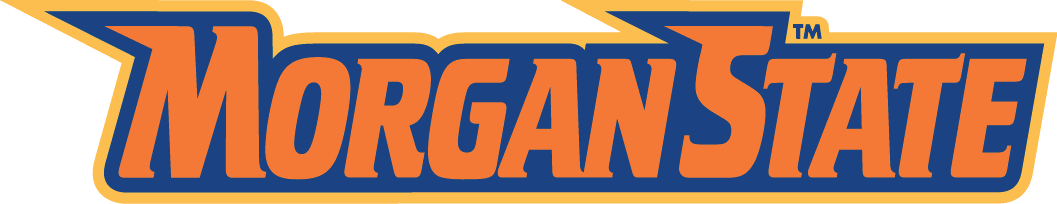
- Conference: Mid-Eastern Athletic Conference
- Record: 15–16 (7–7 MEAC)
- Head coach: Kevin Broadus (4th season)
- Assistant coaches: Chretien Lukusa; Keith Goodie; Larry Stewart
- Home arena: Talmadge L. Hill Field House

2022–23 MEAC men's basketball standings
	Conf.				Overall
Team	W		L	PCT	W		L	PCT
Howard †	11	–	3	.786	22	–	13	.629
North Carolina Central	10	–	4	.714	18	–	12	.600
Norfolk State	9	–	5	.643	22	–	11	.667
Maryland Eastern Shore	9	–	5	.643	18	–	13	.581
Morgan State	7	–	7	.500	15	–	16	.484
Coppin State	4	–	10	.286	9	–	23	.281
Delaware State	4	–	10	.286	6	–	24	.200
South Carolina State	2	–	12	.143	5	–	26	.161
† 2023 MEAC tournament winner

The 2022–23 Morgan State Bears men's basketball team represented Morgan State University in the 2022–23 NCAA Division I men's basketball season. The Bears, led by fourth-year head coach Kevin Broadus, played their home games at Talmadge L. Hill Field House in Baltimore, Maryland as members of the Mid-Eastern Athletic Conference (MEAC).

The Bears finished the season 15–16, 7–7 in MEAC play, to finish in fifth place. They were defeated by Maryland Eastern Shore in the quarterfinals of the MEAC tournament.

== Previous season ==
The Bears finished the 2021–22 season 13–15, 7–6 in MEAC play, to finish in fourth place. In the MEAC tournament, they defeated South Carolina State in the quarterfinals, but lost to Norfolk State in the semifinals.

== Roster ==
2022–23 Morgan State Bears men's basketball team
Players
Coaches

Pos.	#	Name	Height	Weight	Year	Hometown
F	0	Kamron Hobbs	5 ft 10 in (1.78 m)	165 lb (75 kg)	Fr	Stockbridge, GA
F/C	1	Khalil Turner	6 ft 8 in (2.03 m)	215 lb (98 kg)	RS Jr	Philadelphia, PA
G	2	Isaiah Burke	6 ft 1 in (1.85 m)	180 lb (82 kg)	GS	Bowie, MD
G	3	Rob Lawson	6 ft 0 in (1.83 m)	170 lb (77 kg)	Fr	Capitol Heights, MD
G	4	Daiquan Copeland	6 ft 6 in (1.98 m)	215 lb (98 kg)	Jr	Philadelphia, PA
F/C	5	Lewis Djonkam	6 ft 9 in (2.06 m)	245 lb (111 kg)	GS	Springfield, VA
G	10	Will Thomas	6 ft 5 in (1.96 m)	195 lb (88 kg)	Jr	Baltimore, MD
G	11	Malik Miller	6 ft 4 in (1.93 m)	191 lb (87 kg)	GS	Washington, D.C.
G	12	Chase Williams	5 ft 10 in (1.78 m)	160 lb (73 kg)	Fr	Waldorf, MD
F	14	Toto Fagbenle	6 ft 9 in (2.06 m)	220 lb (100 kg)	GS	London, England
F	21	Collin Nnamene	6 ft 8 in (2.03 m)	210 lb (95 kg)	GS	Enugu State, Nigeria
G/F	22	Kevon Wiggins	6 ft 3 in (1.91 m)	190 lb (86 kg)	Jr	Rose Hall Town, Guyana
G/F	23	David McCullough	6 ft 6 in (1.98 m)	190 lb (86 kg)	GS	Bowie, MD
F	31	Ty Horner	6 ft 10 in (2.08 m)	255 lb (116 kg)	Sr	Sisters, OR

Head coach

- Kevin Broadus (Bowie State)

Assistant coach(es)

- Chretien Lukusa (Binghamton)
- Keith Goodie (Morgan State)
- Larry Stewart (Coppin State)

Legend

- (C) Team captain
- (S) Suspended
- (I) Ineligible
- (W) Walk-on
- Injured
- Current redshirt

Roster
Last update: November 30, 2022

== Schedule and results ==
Date time, TV	Rank^{#}	Opponent^{#}	Result	Record	Site (attendance) city, state
Non-conference regular season
November 7, 2022*; 7:30 p.m., FS1		at Xavier	L 73–96	0–1	Cintas Center (10,224); Cincinnati, OH
November 10, 2022*; 7:30 p.m.		Penn State Greater Allegheny	W 130–49	1–1	Talmadge L. Hill Field House (989); Baltimore, MD
November 12, 2022*; 7:00 p.m., ESPN+		at VCU	L 54–69	1–2	Siegel Center (7,125); Richmond, VA
November 15, 2022*; 7:00 p.m., ESPN+		at Akron	L 59–65	1–3	James A. Rhodes Arena (1,759); Akron, OH
November 18, 2022*; 7:00 p.m., HBCUgo		vs. Utah Valley; Jamaica Classic semifinals	W 73–72 ^{OT}	2–3	Montego Bay Convention Centre (5,307); Montego Bay, Jamaica
November 22, 2021*; 5:00 p.m., HBCUgo		vs. Queens; Jamaica Classic championship	L 64–74	2–4	Montego Bay Convention Centre (–); Montego Bay, Jamaica
November 23, 2022*; 3:00 p.m., WCC Network		vs. Loyola Marymount; Jamaica Classic campus-site game	L 80–81	2–5	Gersten Pavilion (586); Los Angeles, CA
November 29, 2022*; 8:30 p.m.		Virginia–Lynchburg	W 123–59	3–5	Talmadge L. Hill Field House (875); Baltimore, MD
December 3, 2022*; 2:00 p.m., ESPN3		at Bowling Green	L 76–86	3–6	Stroh Center (1,365); Bowling Green, OH
December 7, 2022*; 6:00 p.m.		Penn State Wilkes-Barre	W 95–48	4–6	Talmade L. Hill Field House (876); Baltimore, MD
December 10, 2022*; 3:00 p.m., ESPN3		at UMBC	L 63–75	4–7	Chesapeake Employers Insurance Arena (2,030); Catonsville, MD
December 22, 2022*; 8:00 p.m., P12N		at No. 5 Arizona	L 68–93	4–8	McKale Center (14,021); Tucson, AZ
December 30, 2022*; 6:00 p.m.		at Hartford	W 61–54	5–8	Chase Arena (236); West Hartford, CT
January 4, 2023*; 6:00 p.m.		Goucher	W 89–52	6–8	Talmadge L. Hill Field House (278); Baltimore, MD
MEAC regular season
January 7, 2023; 2:00 p.m.		at North Carolina Central	W 78–73	7–8 (1–0)	Talmadge L. Hill Field House (937); Baltimore, MD
January 9, 2023; 7:30 p.m.		South Carolina State	W 90–85	8–8 (2–0)	Talmadge L. Hill Field House; Baltimore, MD
January 14, 2023; 4:00 p.m.		at Coppin State	W 83–66	9–8 (3–0)	Physical Education Complex (1,717); Baltimore, MD
January 18, 2023; 6:00 p.m.		Hartford	W 92–84	10–8	Talmadge L. Hill Field House (1,125); Baltimore, MD
January 21, 2023; 4:00 p.m.		at Howard	L 56–88	10–9 (3–1)	Burr Gymnasium (2,695); Washington, D.C.
January 23, 2023; 7:30 p.m., ESPNU		Norfolk State	W 77–71	11–9 (4–1)	Talmadge L. Hill Field House (1,127); Baltimore, MD
January 28, 2023; 4:00 p.m.		at Delaware State	L 62–64	11–10 (4–2)	Memorial Hall (1,174); Dover, DE
January 30, 2023; 7:30 p.m.		Maryland Eastern Shore	L 58–72	11–11 (4–3)	Talmadge L. Hill Field House (2,271); Baltimore, MD
February 4, 2023; 1:00 p.m., TNT		vs. Delaware State; Invesco QQQ Legacy Classic	W 75–65	12–11	Prudential Center (13,451); Newark, NJ
February 11, 2023; 4:00 p.m.		at North Carolina Central	L 63–83	12–12 (4–4)	McDougald–McLendon Arena (2,686); Durham, NC
February 13, 2023; 7:30 p.m.		at South Carolina State	L 62–74	12–13 (4–5)	SHM Memorial Center (575); Orangeburg, SC
February 18, 2022; 4:00 p.m.		at Norfolk State	L 50–72	12–14 (4–6)	Joseph G. Echols Memorial Hall (4,155); Norfolk, VA
February 20, 2023; 7:30 p.m.		Howard	W 89–76	13–14 (5–6)	Talmadge L. Hill Field House (4,880); Baltimore, MD
February 25, 2023; 4:00 p.m.		at Delaware State	W 83–78	14–14 (6–6)	Talmadge L. Hill Field House (872); Baltimore, MD
February 27, 2023; 7:30 p.m.		at Maryland Eastern Shore	W 68–61	15–14 (7–6)	Hytche Athletic Center (1,080); Princess Anne, MD
March 2, 2023; 7:00 p.m.		Coppin State	L 65–77	15–15 (7–7)	Talmadge L. Hill Field House (1,172); Baltimore, MD
MEAC tournament
March 9, 2023; 6:00 p.m., ESPN+	(5)	vs. (4) Maryland Eastern Shore; Quarterfinals	L 64–80	15–16	Norfolk Scope; Norfolk, VA
*Non-conference game. ^{#}Rankings from AP poll. (#) Tournament seedings in parentheses. All times are in Eastern.
