= 2022–23 Howard Bison men's basketball team =

American college basketball season

2022–23 Howard Bison men's basketball

MEAC regular-season and tournament champions

NCAA tournament, first round
- Conference: Mid-Eastern Athletic Conference
- Record: 22–13 (11–3 MEAC)
- Head coach: Kenny Blakeney (4th season)
- Assistant coaches: Rod Balanis; Tyler Thornton; Steve Ongley
- Home arena: Burr Gymnasium

2022–23 MEAC men's basketball standings
	Conf.				Overall
Team	W		L	PCT	W		L	PCT
Howard †	11	–	3	.786	22	–	13	.629
North Carolina Central	10	–	4	.714	18	–	12	.600
Norfolk State	9	–	5	.643	22	–	11	.667
Maryland Eastern Shore	9	–	5	.643	18	–	13	.581
Morgan State	7	–	7	.500	15	–	16	.484
Coppin State	4	–	10	.286	9	–	23	.281
Delaware State	4	–	10	.286	6	–	24	.200
South Carolina State	2	–	12	.143	5	–	26	.161
† 2023 MEAC tournament winner

The 2022–23 Howard Bison men's basketball team represented Howard University in the 2022–23 NCAA Division I men's basketball season. The Bison, led by fourth-year head coach Kenny Blakeney, played their home games at Burr Gymnasium in Washington, D.C. as members of the Mid-Eastern Athletic Conference (MEAC). They finished the season 19–12, 11–3 in MEAC play, to finish in first place. As the No. 1 seed, they defeated South Carolina State, Maryland Eastern Shore and Norfolk State to win the MEAC tournament. They received the conference's automatic bid to the NCAA tournament, Howard's first appearance in the tournament since 1992. As the No. 16 seed in the West Region, they were defeated by No. 1 seed Kansas in the first round.

== Previous season ==
The Bison finished the 2021–22 season 16–12, 9–5 in MEAC play, to finish in second place. As the No. 2 seed, they were upset by No. 7 seed Coppin State in the quarterfinals of the MEAC tournament.

== Roster ==
2022–23 Howard Bison men's basketball team
Players
Coaches

Pos.	#	Name	Height	Weight	Year	Previous school	Hometown
G	0	Marcus Dockery	6 ft 2 in (1.88 m)	170 lb (77 kg)	So	Maryland	Washington, D.C.
G	1	Khalil Robinson	6 ft 0 in (1.83 m)	154 lb (70 kg)	Sr	Gray Collegiate Academy	Columbia, SC
F	2	Steve III Settle	6 ft 10 in (2.08 m)	180 lb (82 kg)	RS Jr	DeMatha Catholic HS	Glenarden, MD
G	3	Elijah Hawkins	5 ft 11 in (1.8 m)	152 lb (69 kg)	So	DeMatha Catholic HS	Washington, D.C.
F	4	Miles Stewart	6 ft 7 in (2.01 m)	202 lb (92 kg)	RS Fr	Lake Highland Prep	Orlando, FL
G	5	Jelani Williams	6 ft 5 in (1.96 m)	201 lb (91 kg)	GS	Penn	Washington, D.C.
G	10	Talin Lewis	6 ft 4 in (1.93 m)	182 lb (83 kg)	RS Jr	Corban	Westlake Village, CA
G	11	Ose Okojie	6 ft 5 in (1.96 m)	191 lb (87 kg)	Fr	United Scholastic Academy	Brampton, ON
F	12	Kobe Dickson	6 ft 9 in (2.06 m)	250 lb (113 kg)	GS	Cornell	Holcomb, KS
G	13	Thomas Weaver	5 ft 10 in (1.78 m)	156 lb (71 kg)	Jr	Riverdale Baptist School	Upper Marlboro, MD
F	14	Ayodele Taiwo	6 ft 9 in (2.06 m)	243 lb (110 kg)	RS Fr	NBA Academy Africa	Lagos, Nigeria
F	15	Reece Brown	6 ft 9 in (2.06 m)	191 lb (87 kg)	Jr	UNLV	Albany, NY
F	22	Shy Odom	6 ft 6 in (1.98 m)	229 lb (104 kg)	Fr	Sierra Canyon School	Chatsworth, CA
F	24	Jordan Wood	6 ft 9 in (2.06 m)	205 lb (93 kg)	Jr	Cornerstone Christian	San Antonio, TX
G	34	Bryce Harris	6 ft 4 in (1.93 m)	220 lb (100 kg)	So	Putnam Science	Brentwood, NY
G	55	Freedom Rhames	5 ft 11 in (1.8 m)	169 lb (77 kg)	Fr	Brewster Academy	Los Angeles, CA

Head coach

- Kenny Blakeney (Duke)

Assistant coach(es)

- Rod Balanis (Georgia Tech)
- Tyler Thornton (Duke)
- Steve Ongley (Southern Connecticut)

Legend

- (C) Team captain
- (S) Suspended
- (I) Ineligible
- (W) Walk-on
- Injured
- Current redshirt

Roster
Last update: November 11, 2022

== Schedule and results ==
Date time, TV	Rank^{#}	Opponent^{#}	Result	Record	Site (attendance) city, state
Exhibition
October 25, 2022*; 7:00 p.m.		Bowie State	W 114–77	–	Burr Gymnasium; Washington, D.C.
November 1, 2022*; 7:00 p.m.		Multnomah	W 81–69	–	Burr Gymnasium (654); Washington, D.C.
Regular season
November 7, 2022*; 6:30 p.m., SECN		at No. 4 Kentucky	L 63–95	0–1	Rupp Arena (18,750); Lexington, KY
November 9, 2022*; 7:00 p.m.		District of Columbia	W 87–74	1–1	Burr Gymnasium (1,283); Washington, D.C.
November 11, 2022*; 6:00 p.m., ESPN+		at George Washington	L 75–85	1–2	Charles E. Smith Center (2,363); Washington, D.C.
November 13, 2022*; 12:00 p.m.		Gallaudet	W 108–56	2–2	Burr Gymnasium; Washington, D.C.
November 15, 2022*; 7:00 p.m.		James Madison	L 69–95	2–3	Burr Gymnasium (889); Washington, D.C.
November 18, 2022*; 4:15 p.m., ESPN3		vs. Wyoming; Paradise Jam first round	L 71–78	2–4	Sports and Fitness Center (1,524); Saint Thomas, USVI
November 19, 2022*; 3:15 p.m., ESPN+		vs. Buffalo; Paradise Jam Consolation second round	W 63–59	3–4	Sports and Fitness Center; Saint Thomas, USVI
November 21, 2022*; 3:35 p.m., ESPN+		vs. Belmont; Paradise Jam fifth-place game	L 73–96	3–5	Sports and Fitness Center (724); Saint Thomas, USVI
November 26, 2022*; 3:00 p.m., ESPN+		at Austin Peay	W 56–55	4–5	Dunn Center (1,029); Clarksville, TN
November 30, 2022*; 7:00 p.m., ESPN+		at Yale	L 40–86	4–6	John J. Lee Amphitheater (752); New Haven, CT
December 3, 2022*; 5:00 p.m., FloHoops		at Hampton	L 65–74	4–7	Hampton Convocation Center; Hampton, VA
December 11, 2022*; 7:00 p.m., ESPN+		at VCU	L 60–70	4–8	Siegel Center (7,220); Richmond, VA
December 13, 2022*; 8:00 p.m.		FIU	W 71–59	5–8	Burr Gymnasium (654); Washington, D.C.
December 18, 2022*; 12:00 p.m., ESPN+		at Harvard	W 66–54	6–8	Lavietes Pavilion (1,473); Cambridge, MA
December 21, 2022*; 2:00 p.m., HBCU Go		Mount St. Mary's	W 63–62	7–8	Burr Gymnasium (489); Washington, D.C.
December 29, 2022*; 2:00 p.m., HBCU Go		La Salle	L 76–80	7–9	Burr Gymnasium (539); Washington, D.C.
January 7, 2023; 4:00 p.m.		Delaware State	W 84–64	8–9 (1–0)	Burr Gymnasium (898); Washington, D.C.
January 9, 2023; 7:30 p.m.		at Maryland Eastern Shore	L 73–82	8–10 (1–1)	Hytche Athletic Center (593); Princess Anne, MD
January 14, 2023; 4:00 p.m.		at Norfolk State	W 86–84	9–10 (2–1)	Joseph G. Echols Memorial Hall (2,986); Norfolk, VA
January 16, 2023*; 7:00 p.m., FS1		Morehouse; MLK Day Classic	W 89–65	10–10	Burr Gymnasium (2,695); Washington, D.C.
January 21, 2023; 4:00 p.m.		Morgan State	W 88–56	11–10 (3–1)	Burr Gymnasium (2,695); Washington, D.C.
January 23, 2023; 7:30 p.m.		Coppin State	W 90–76	12–10 (4–1)	Burr Gymnasium (2,138); Washington, D.C.
January 28, 2023; 6:00 p.m., ESPNU		North Carolina Central	W 71–67	13–10 (5–1)	Burr Gymnasium (2,695); Washington, D.C.
January 30, 2023; 7:30 p.m.		South Carolina State	W 100-74	14–10 (6–1)	Burr Gymnasium (2,359); Washington, D.C.
February 11, 2023; 4:00 p.m.		at Delaware State	W 86–85 ^{OT}	15–10 (7–1)	Memorial Hall (1,347); Dover, DE
February 13, 2023; 7:30 p.m.		Maryland Eastern Shore	W 78–69	16–10 (8–1)	Burr Gymnasium; Washington, D.C.
February 18, 2023; 4:00 p.m.		at Coppin State	W 80–70	17–10 (9–1)	Physical Education Complex (2,106); Baltimore, MD
February 20, 2023; 7:30 p.m.		at Morgan State	L 76–89	17–11 (9–2)	Talmadge L. Hill Field House (4,880); Baltimore, MD
February 25, 2023; 4:00 p.m.		at North Carolina Central	L 60–68	17–12 (9–3)	McDougald–McLendon Arena (3,122); Durham, NC
February 27, 2023; 7:30 p.m.		at South Carolina State	W 82–78	18–12 (10–3)	SHM Memorial Center (498); Orangeburg, SC
March 2, 2023; 9:00 p.m., ESPNU		Norfolk State	W 87–67	19–12 (11–3)	Burr Gymnasium (2,695); Washington, D.C.
MEAC tournament
March 8, 2023; 6:00 p.m., ESPN+	(1)	vs. (8) South Carolina State; Quarterfinals	W 91–55	20–12	Norfolk Scope; Norfolk, VA
March 10, 2023; 6:00 p.m., ESPN+	(1)	vs. (4) Maryland Eastern Shore; Semifinals	W 74–55	21–12	Norfolk Scope; Norfolk, VA
March 11, 2023; 1:00 p.m., ESPN2	(1)	vs. (3) Norfolk State; Championship	W 65–64	22–12	Norfolk Scope; Norfolk, VA
NCAA tournament
March 16, 2023*; 2:00 p.m., TruTV	(16 W)	vs. (1 W) No. 4 Kansas; First Round	L 68–96	22–13	Wells Fargo Arena (16,745); Des Moines, IA
*Non-conference game. ^{#}Rankings from AP poll. (#) Tournament seedings in parentheses. All times are in Eastern.
