= 2022–23 Norfolk State Spartans men's basketball team =

American college basketball season

2022–23 Norfolk State Spartans men's basketball
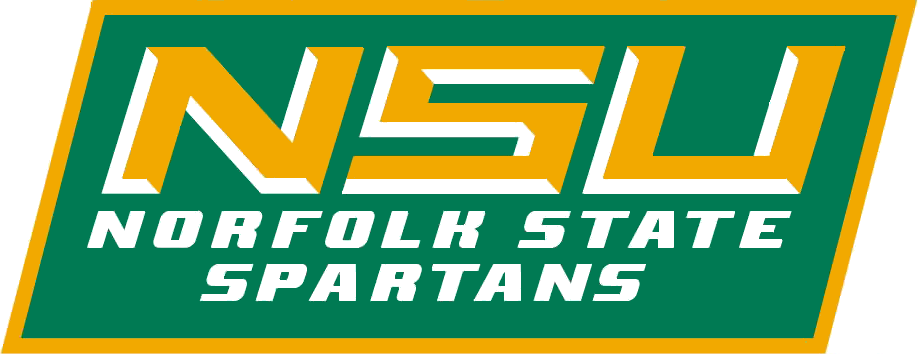
- Conference: Mid-Eastern Athletic Conference
- Record: 22–11 (9–5 MEAC)
- Head coach: Robert Jones (10th season)
- Associate head coach: Jamal Brown
- Assistant coaches: C.J. Clemons; Leonard Fairley
- Home arena: Joseph G. Echols Memorial Hall

2022–23 MEAC men's basketball standings
| | Conf. | | | | Overall |
| Team | W | | L | PCT | W | | L | PCT |
|---|---|---|---|---|---|---|---|---|
| Howard † | 11 | – | 3 | .786 | 22 | – | 13 | .629 |
| North Carolina Central | 10 | – | 4 | .714 | 18 | – | 12 | .600 |
| Norfolk State | 9 | – | 5 | .643 | 22 | – | 11 | .667 |
| Maryland Eastern Shore | 9 | – | 5 | .643 | 18 | – | 13 | .581 |
| Morgan State | 7 | – | 7 | .500 | 15 | – | 16 | .484 |
| Coppin State | 4 | – | 10 | .286 | 9 | – | 23 | .281 |
| Delaware State | 4 | – | 10 | .286 | 6 | – | 24 | .200 |
| South Carolina State | 2 | – | 12 | .143 | 5 | – | 26 | .161 |
† 2023 MEAC tournament winner

The 2022–23 Norfolk State Spartans men's basketball team represented Norfolk State University in the 2022–23 NCAA Division I men's basketball season. The Spartans, led by tenth-year head coach Robert Jones, played their home games at the Joseph G. Echols Memorial Hall in Norfolk, Virginia as members of the Mid-Eastern Athletic Conference.

== Previous season ==
The Spartans finished the 2021–22 season 24–7, 12–2 in MEAC play to finish as MEAC regular season champions. In the MEAC tournament, they defeated Delaware State, Morgan State, and Coppin State to win the MEAC tournament championship and earned the conference's automatic bid to the NCAA tournament. They received the No. 16 seed in the East Region, where they would lose to the defending champions Baylor in the First Round.

== Roster ==
2022–23 Norfolk State Spartans men's basketball team
Players
Coaches

| Pos. | # | Name | Height | Weight | Year | Hometown |
|---|---|---|---|---|---|---|
| G | 0 | Christian Ings | 6 ft 2 in (1.88 m) | 180 lb (82 kg) | So | Philadelphia, Pennsylvania |
| G | 1 | George Beale Jr. | 6 ft 4 in (1.93 m) | 200 lb (91 kg) | Fr | Suffolk, Virginia |
| G | 2 | Terrance Jones | 6 ft 3 in (1.91 m) | 180 lb (82 kg) | So | Trenton, New Jersey |
| G | 3 | Gilbert Brown II | 6 ft 0 in (1.83 m) | 175 lb (79 kg) | So | Columbia, South Carolina |
| G | 4 | Joe Bryant Jr. | 6 ft 1 in (1.85 m) | 205 lb (93 kg) | Sr | Norfolk, Virginia |
| G/F | 5 | Tyrese Jenkins | 6 ft 6 in (1.98 m) | 200 lb (91 kg) | Jr | Richmond, Virginia |
| G/F | 13 | Daryl Anderson | 6 ft 6 in (1.98 m) | 185 lb (84 kg) | Jr | North Chesterfield, Virginia |
| F | 21 | Dana Tate Jr. | 6 ft 7 in (2.01 m) | 220 lb (100 kg) | RS Sr | Boston, Massachusetts |
| G | 22 | Andre Bottoms | 6 ft 0 in (1.83 m) | 180 lb (82 kg) | So | Chesapeake, Virginia |
| F | 30 | Kris Bankston | 6 ft 9 in (2.06 m) | 230 lb (104 kg) | GS | Little Rock, Arkansas |
| G | 31 | Cahiem Brown | 6 ft 5 in (1.96 m) | 200 lb (91 kg) | RS Jr | Brooklyn, New York |
| F | 32 | Chris Ford | 6 ft 8 in (2.03 m) | 235 lb (107 kg) | Sr | Chesterfield, Virginia |
| F | 33 | Jack Doumbia | 6 ft 6 in (1.98 m) | 210 lb (95 kg) | So | Lanham, Maryland |
| G/F | 35 | Yoro Sidibe | 6 ft 7 in (2.01 m) | 220 lb (100 kg) | Jr | Dakar, Senegal |
| F | 50 | Nyzaiah Chambers | 6 ft 7 in (2.01 m) | 230 lb (104 kg) | Jr | Chesapeake, Virginia |

Head coach

- Robert Jones (SUNY New Paltz)

Assistant coach(es)

- Jamal Brown (South Carolina State)
- C.J. Clemons (Norfolk State)
- Leonard Fairley (Norfolk State)

Legend

- (C) Team captain
- (S) Suspended
- (I) Ineligible
- (W) Walk-on
- Injured
- Current redshirt

Roster
Last update: January 7, 2023

== Schedule and results ==
| Date time, TV | Rank^{#} | Opponent^{#} | Result | Record | High points | High rebounds | High assists | Site (attendance) city, state |
Regular season
| November 7, 2022*; 7:30 pm | | Virginia–Lynchburg | W 109–59 | 1–0 | 18 – Beale Jr. | 14 – Beale Jr. | 9 – Ings | Joseph G. Echols Memorial Hall (2,301); Norfolk, VA |
| November 9, 2022*; 7:00 pm | | Cairn | W 87–59 | 2–0 | 16 – 4 Tied | 13 – Bankston | 3 – 2 Tied | Joseph G. Echols Memorial Hall (1,389); Norfolk, VA |
| November 11, 2022*; 8:00 pm, Big 12 Now | | at No. 5 Baylor; Continental Tire Main Event On-Campus Game | L 70–87 | 2–1 | 24 – Bryant Jr. | 6 – Bryant Jr. | 4 – Ings | Ferrell Center (9,728); Waco, TX |
| November 14, 2022*; 10:00 pm, P12N | | at No. 8 UCLA; Continental Tire Main Event On-Campus Game | L 56–86 | 2–2 | 17 – Bankston | 9 – Bankston | 4 – Brown | Pauley Pavilion (6,056); Los Angeles, CA |
| November 17, 2022*; 7:00 pm, FloHoops | | at Monmouth; Continental Tire Main Event On-Campus Game | W 64–59 | 3–2 | 23 – Bryant Jr. | 7 – Bryant Jr. | 3 – Ings | OceanFirst Bank Center (1,669); West Long Branch, NJ |
| November 19, 2022*; 6:00 pm | | vs. Alabama A&M; ATL Has Something to Say HBCU Challenge | W 89–83 | 4–2 | 20 – Brown | 8 – Bankston | 7 – Ings | Forbes Arena; Atlanta, GA |
| November 22, 2022*; 7:00 pm | | St. Mary's (MD) | W 91–41 | 5–2 | 15 – 3 Tied | 10 – Doumbia | 5 – Tate Jr. | Joseph G. Echols Memorial Hall (789); Norfolk, VA |
| November 29, 2022*; 8:00 pm, ESPN+ | | at No. 1 Houston | L 52–100 | 5–3 | 14 – Bankston | 4 – 3 Tied | 2 – Bryant Jr. | Fertitta Center (7,308); Houston, TX |
| December 3, 2022*; 7:00 pm, ESPN+ | | at Old Dominion; Scope Series | L 62–68 | 5–4 | 17 – Bryant Jr. | 8 – Anderson | 7 – Ings | Chartway Arena (7,966); Norfolk, VA |
| December 10, 2022*; 4:00 pm, FloHoops | | at William & Mary | W 67–53 | 6–4 | 24 – Bryant Jr. | 12 – Brown | 5 – Bryant Jr. | Kaplan Arena (2,541); Williamsburg, VA |
| December 14, 2022*; 8:00 pm, HBCU Go | | Bowling Green | W 81–75 | 7–4 | 20 – Brown | 10 – 2 Tied | 4 – Brown | Joseph G. Echols Memorial Hall (782); Norfolk, VA |
| December 17, 2022*; 4:00 pm, ESPN+ | | vs. Hampton; Boost Mobile HBCU Challenge | W 78–66 | 8–4 | 23 – Bryant Jr. | 14 – Bryant Jr. | 3 – 2 Tied | MGM Grand Garden Arena; Las Vegas, NV |
| December 18, 2022*; 2:00 pm, ESPNU | | vs. North Carolina A&T; Boost Mobile HBCU Challenge | W 70–66 | 9–4 | 24 – Tate Jr. | 8 – 2 Tied | 6 – Brown | MGM Grand Garden Arena; Las Vegas, NV |
| December 21, 2022*; 5:00 pm, MW Network | | at Nevada | L 66–78 | 9–5 | 25 – Bryant Jr. | 6 – Tate Jr. | 4 – Brown | Lawlor Events Center (5,380); Reno, NV |
| January 4, 2023*; 7:00 pm | | Penn State Wilkes-Barre | W 85–60 | 10–5 | 20 – Bankston | 8 – Brown | 6 – Bryant Jr. | Joseph G. Echols Memorial Hall (505); Norfolk, VA |
| January 7, 2023; 4:00 pm | | Maryland Eastern Shore | W 57–46 | 11–5 (1–0) | 15 – Bryant Jr. | 12 – Bankston | 7 – Bryant Jr. | Joseph G. Echols Memorial Hall (1,503); Norfolk, VA |
| January 9, 2023; 7:30 pm | | at Delaware State | W 78–65 | 12–5 (2–0) | 20 – Bryant Jr. | 8 – Anderson | 6 – Bryant Jr. | Memorial Hall (1,750); Dover, DE |
| January 14, 2023; 4:00 pm | | Howard | L 84–86 | 12–6 (2–1) | 23 – Bryant Jr. | 7 – Bankston | 5 – Brown | Joseph G. Echols Memorial Hall (2,986); Norfolk, VA |
| January 21, 2023; 4:00 pm | | at Coppin State | W 96–65 | 13–6 (3–1) | 21 – Brown | 13 – Bankston | 6 – Bryant | Physical Education Complex (516); Baltimore, MD |
| January 23, 2023; 7:30 pm, ESPNU | | at Morgan State | L 71–77 | 13–7 (3–2) | 24 – Bankston | 8 – Bankston | 4 – Tied | Talmadge L. Hill Field House (1,127); Baltimore, MD |
| January 28, 2023; 4:00 pm | | South Carolina State | W 82–68 | 14–7 (4–2) | 23 – Bryant Jr. | 9 – Bryant Jr. | 3 – 3 Tied | Joseph G. Echols Memorial Hall (3,177); Norfolk, VA |
| January 30, 2023; 7:00 pm, ESPNU | | North Carolina Central | W 77–71 | 15–7 (5–2) | 21 – Tate Jr. | 8 – Brown | 3 – Brown | Joseph G. Echols Memorial Hall (3,437); Norfolk, VA |
| February 4, 2023*; 2:00 pm, TNT | | vs. Hampton; Invesco QQQ Legacy Classic | W 83–71 | 16–7 | 29 – Bryant Jr. | 8 – Bankston | 5 – 2 Tied | Prudential Center (13,451); Newark, NJ |
| February 11, 2023; 4:00 pm | | at Maryland Eastern Shore | W 76–73 | 17–7 (6–2) | 25 – Bryant Jr. | 9 – Tate Jr. | 4 – Jones | Hytche Athletic Center (2,147); Princess Anne, MD |
| February 13, 2023; 7:30 pm | | Delaware State | W 97–58 | 18–7 (7–2) | 22 – Bankston | 6 – Tied | 6 – Brown | Joseph G. Echols Memorial Hall (2,011); Norfolk, VA |
| February 18, 2023; 4:00 pm | | Morgan State | W 72–50 | 19–7 (8–2) | 23 – Bankston | 9 – Bankston | 4 – Brown | Joseph G. Echols Memorial Hall (4,155); Norfolk, VA |
| February 20, 2023; 7:30 pm | | Coppin State | L 62–69 | 19–8 (8–3) | 11 – Tied | 8 – Tied | 5 – Brown | Joseph G. Echols Memorial Hall (2,686); Norfolk, VA |
| February 25, 2023; 4:00 pm | | at South Carolina State | W 88–76 | 20–8 (9–3) | 24 – Bryant Jr. | 6 – Bankston | 4 – Brown | SHM Memorial Center (527); Orangeburg, SC |
| February 27, 2023; 7:30 pm | | at North Carolina Central | L 75–76 ^{OT} | 20–9 (9–4) | 29 – Bankston | 12 – Bankston | 3 – Brown | McDougald–McLendon Arena (2,999); Durham, NC |
| March 2, 2023; 9:00 pm, ESPNU | | at Howard | L 67–87 | 20–10 (9–5) | 18 – Tied | 6 – Tied | 1 – Tied | Burr Gymnasium (2,695); Washington, D.C. |
MEAC tournament
| March 9, 2022; 8:00 pm, ESPN+ | (3) | vs. (6) Coppin State; Quarterfinals | W 73–56 | 21–10 | 25 – Bryant Jr. | 11 – Bankston | 5 – Brown | Norfolk Scope; Norfolk, VA |
| March 10, 2022; 8:00 pm, ESPN+ | (3) | vs. (2) North Carolina Central; Semifinals | W 72–65 ^{OT} | 22–10 | 23 – Bryant Jr. | 10 – Bryant Jr. | 3 – Tied | Norfolk Scope; Norfolk, VA |
| March 11, 2022; 1:00 pm, ESPN2 | (3) | vs. (1) Howard; Championship | L 64–65 | 22–11 | 19 – Tate Jr. | 7 – Tate Jr. | 3 – Tied | Norfolk Scope; Norfolk, VA |
*Non-conference game. ^{#}Rankings from AP Poll. (#) Tournament seedings in parentheses. All times are in Eastern.
