= Jibri Blount =

American football and basketball player (born 1996)

Profile
- Position: Tight end

Personal information
- Born: October 21, 1996 (age 30); Pittsburgh, Pennsylvania, U.S.
- Listed height: 6 ft 7 in (2.01 m)
- Listed weight: 245 lb (111 kg)

Career information
- High school: Linsly School (Wheeling, West Virginia); St. Vincent–St. Mary (Akron, Ohio)
- College: Cleveland State (2015–2017); North Carolina Central (2018–2020)
- NFL draft: 2020: undrafted

Career history
- Miami Dolphins (2021)*; Arlington Renegades (2023)*
- * Offseason or practice squad member only

Awards and highlights
- MEAC Men's Basketball Player of the Year (2020); First-team basketball All-MEAC (2020)

Jibri Blount (born October 21, 1996) is an American former football tight end. He played college basketball for the Cleveland State Vikings and the North Carolina Central Eagles. He converted to football and signed with the Miami Dolphins in 2021.

== Early life ==
Blount was raised in Pittsburgh, Pennsylvania, and attended Linsly School for two years. He transferred to St. Vincent–St. Mary High School in Akron, Ohio, where he was coached by Dru Joyce II. In September 2014, Blount committed to Cleveland State. As a senior, Blount was a second-team all-district and All-Ohio honoree after averaging 16.0 points and 11.0 rebounds per game, leading the team to a 16–1 record.

== College career ==
As a freshman at Cleveland State, Blount averaged 5.7 points per game. After his sophomore season, Blount decided to transfer to North Carolina Central and sat out the 2017–18 season as a redshirt. As a junior, Blount averaged 10.1 points and 4.4 rebounds per game. Blount scored 33 points, which matched his career high, and grabbed 10 rebounds on January 25, 2020, helping North Carolina Central to a 72–45 victory over Delaware State. On February 10, Blount scored 20 points, including the game-winning basket with 2.2 seconds left, and pulled down nine rebounds in a 58–57 win against Morgan State. He was named Mid-Eastern Athletic Conference (MEAC) player of the week five times. At the conclusion of the regular season, Blount earned MEAC Player of the Year honors. He averaged 19.1 points and 9.3 rebounds per game and led the MEAC in steals.

=== College statistics ===
Legend
GP	Games played	GS	Games started	MPG	Minutes per game
FG%	Field goal percentage	3P%	3-point field goal percentage	FT%	Free throw percentage
RPG	Rebounds per game	APG	Assists per game	SPG	Steals per game
BPG	Blocks per game	PPG	Points per game	**Bold**	Career high

Year	Team	GP	GS	MPG	FG%	3P%	FT%	RPG	APG	SPG	BPG	PPG
2015–16	Cleveland State	29	5	16.7	.492	**.500**	.620	3.1	.5	.9	.4	5.7
2016–17	Cleveland State	30	10	15.0	.410	.289	.667	2.2	.5	.7	.2	3.8
2017–18	North Carolina Central	Redshirt										
2018–19	North Carolina Central	24	0	21.9	.492	.288	**.736**	4.4	**1.6**	1.0	.4	10.1
2019–20	North Carolina Central	**31**	**31**	**36.8**	**.525**	.319	.712	**9.3**	**1.6**	**2.1**	**.6**	**19.1**
Career		114	46	22.8	.498	.307	.696	4.8	1.1	1.2	.4	9.8

== Professional career ==
On May 6, 2021, Blount signed with the Miami Dolphins of the NFL as a tight end. He was waived on July 26, 2021.

Blount was assigned to the Arlington Renegades of the XFL on January 6, 2023.

== Personal life ==
Blount's father is Mel Blount, an NFL Hall of Fame inductee who played for the Pittsburgh Steelers. When Jibri was in third grade, he brought two of his father's championship rings to class without telling him. His older brother Akil was signed by the Miami Dolphins in 2016, and younger brother Khalid plays football for Duquesne.
