= Christian Ings =

American basketball player (born 1999)

Personal information
- Born: September 14, 1999 (age 27) Philadelphia, Pennsylvania, U.S.
- Listed height: 6 ft 2 in (1.88 m)

Career information
- High school: Saints Neumann Goretti (Philadelphia, Pennsylvania)
- College: Rider (2019–2021) Norfolk State (2021–2025)
- Position: Guard

Career highlights
- MEAC Champion (2025)

Christian Ings (born September 14, 1999) is an American college basketball player who played his graduate season (2024–25) for Norfolk State University in the Mid-Eastern Athletic Conference (MEAC).

== Career ==
=== Rider ===
Ings began his college basketball career at Rider University, where he played two seasons in the Metro Atlantic Athletic Conference (MAAC). As a freshman, he earned little minutes off the bench, averaging nearly five points per game.

=== Norfolk State ===
Ings transferred to Norfolk State University, where he played the final four seasons of his career with the Spartans. By the end of his graduate senior season (2024–25), Ings was averaging 12 points, 3 assists, and 2 rebounds per game, while shooting 48.9% from the field and 47.3% from three-point range.

==== National media ====
Ings gained national media attention during Norfolk State's Senior Night against Morgan State in February 2025. In the closing minutes, he delivered back-to-back dunks — including a windmill — that went viral on social media and were featured on SportsCenter's Top-10 Plays.

Following the season, Ings was selected to compete in the King's Hawaiian Slam Dunk Championship at the State Farm College Slam Dunk & 3-Point Championships, where he won the dunk championship. He was also chosen to play in the HBCU All-Star Game, representing Team Al Attles.

== College statistics ==
*	Led NCAA Division I

Year	Team	GP	GS	MPG	FG%	3P%	FT%	RPG	APG	SPG	BPG	PPG
2019–20	Rider	30	18	18.4	.424	.316	.611	1.9	1.7	.6	.0	4.9
2020–21	Rider	22	20	25.2	.401	.227	.651	3.5	2.4	.9	.1	7.7
2021–22	Norfolk State	25	21	23.3	.420	.405	.687	2.4	2.5	.9	.1	8.9
2022–23	Norfolk State	13	12	25.8	.612	.368	.690	2.2	3.5	1.0	.2	10.1
2023–24	Norfolk State	31	22	21.4	.471	.346	.759	2.1	2.1	.8	.2	8.8
2024–25	Norfolk State	33	32	27.6	.489	.473	.736	2.1	3.2	.8	.1	12.1
Career		154	125	23.4	.463	.380	.701	2.5	2.5	.8	.1	8.7

== Personal ==
He is the son of Nyah Watkins and Daniel Ings Sr. He has an older brother, Daniel, and a younger brother, Alex.
