= 2022–23 Maryland Eastern Shore Hawks men's basketball team =

American college basketball season

2022–23 Maryland Eastern Shore Hawks men's basketball
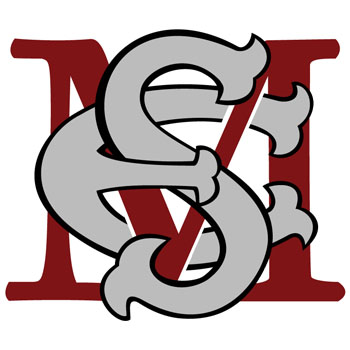
- Conference: Mid-Eastern Athletic Conference
- Record: 18–13 (9–5 MEAC)
- Head coach: Jason Crafton (3rd season)
- Assistant coaches: Montay Brandon; Kassim Kaba; Larry Roberson
- Home arena: Hytche Athletic Center

2022–23 MEAC men's basketball standings
	Conf.				Overall
Team	W		L	PCT	W		L	PCT
Howard †	11	–	3	.786	22	–	13	.629
North Carolina Central	10	–	4	.714	18	–	12	.600
Norfolk State	9	–	5	.643	22	–	11	.667
Maryland Eastern Shore	9	–	5	.643	18	–	13	.581
Morgan State	7	–	7	.500	15	–	16	.484
Coppin State	4	–	10	.286	9	–	23	.281
Delaware State	4	–	10	.286	6	–	24	.200
South Carolina State	2	–	12	.143	5	–	26	.161
† 2023 MEAC tournament winner

The 2022–23 Maryland Eastern Shore Hawks men's basketball team represented the University of Maryland Eastern Shore in the 2022–23 NCAA Division I men's basketball season. The Hawks, led by third-year head coach Jason Crafton, played their home games at the Hytche Athletic Center in Princess Anne, Maryland as members of the Mid-Eastern Athletic Conference (MEAC).

The Hawks finished the season 18–13, 9–5 in MEAC play, to finish tied for third place. They defeated Morgan State in the quarterfinals of the MEAC tournament before falling to top-seeded and eventual tournament champions Howard in the semifinals.

== Previous season ==
The Hawks finished the 2021–22 season 11–16, 6–8 in MEAC play, to finish in a tie for sixth place. In the quarterfinals of the MEAC tournament, they were defeated by North Carolina Central. They were invited to The Basketball Classic, where they lost to Coastal Carolina in the first round.

== Roster ==
2022–23 Maryland Eastern Shore Hawks men's basketball team
Players
Coaches

Pos.	#	Name	Height	Weight	Year	Hometown
G	0	Ahamadou Fofana	6 ft 1 in (1.85 m)	175 lb (79 kg)	GS	The Bronx, NY
G	1	Donchevell Nugent	6 ft 0 in (1.83 m)	178 lb (81 kg)	GS	Newburgh, NY
G	2	Chace Davis	6 ft 3 in (1.91 m)	180 lb (82 kg)	So	Accokeek, MD
G	3	Zion Styles	6 ft 3 in (1.91 m)	199 lb (90 kg)	GS	Uniondale, NY
G	4	Kevon Voyles	6 ft 3 in (1.91 m)	181 lb (82 kg)	Sr	Cape Charles, VA
G	5	Da'Shawn Phillip	6 ft 5 in (1.96 m)	172 lb (78 kg)	Sr	Baltimore, MD
G	10	Dionte Johnson	6 ft 0 in (1.83 m)	—	Fr	The Bronx, NY
F	11	Kohen Thompson	6 ft 7 in (2.01 m)	205 lb (93 kg)	Sr	Memphis, TN
F	13	Victory Naboya	6 ft 8 in (2.03 m)	—	Fr	Temple Hills, MD
PG	15	Glen Anderson	5 ft 7 in (1.7 m)	166 lb (75 kg)	Sr	Harlem, NY
F	22	Nathaniel Jr. Pollard	6 ft 5 in (1.96 m)	225 lb (102 kg)	GS	Richmond, VA
G	23	Toby Nnadozie	6 ft 3 in (1.91 m)	—	Fr	Baltimore, MD
F	24	Troy Hupstead	6 ft 7 in (2.01 m)	230 lb (104 kg)	So	Mount Vernon, NY

Head coach

- Jason Crafton (Nyack)

Assistant coach(es)

- Montay Brandon (Florida State)
- Kassim Kaba (American International)
- Larry Roberson (Nyack)

Legend

- (C) Team captain
- (S) Suspended
- (I) Ineligible
- (W) Walk-on
- Injured
- Current redshirt

Roster
Last update: December 10, 2022

== Schedule and results ==
Date time, TV	Rank^{#}	Opponent^{#}	Result	Record	Site (attendance) city, state
Regular season
November 7, 2022*; 7:00 p.m., ESPN+		at Old Dominion	L 65–84	0–1	Chartway Arena (4,798); Norfolk, VA
November 12, 2022*; 4:00 p.m., Facebook Live		Bryn Athyn	W 90–43	1–1	Hytche Athletic Center (1,432); Princess Anne, MD
November 14, 2022*; 7:00 p.m., ESPN+		at Charlotte	L 47–80	1–2	Dale F. Halton Arena (2,929); Charlotte, NC
November 18, 2022*; 7:00 p.m., ESPN+		at George Washington	L 64–69	1–3	Charles E. Smith Center (1,147); Washington, D.C.
November 22, 2022*; 8:00 p.m., Facebook Live		Marist	W 70–59	2–3	Hytche Athletic Center (598); Princess Anne, MD
November 25, 2022*; 6:00 p.m., ACCN		at No. 5 Virginia	L 45–72	2–4	John Paul Jones Arena (13,882); Charlottesville, VA
November 30, 2022*; 7:00 p.m., Facebook Live		Lehigh	W 64–60	3–4	Hytche Athletic Center (434); Princess Anne, MD
December 2, 2022*; 7:00 p.m., ESPN+		at Liberty	L 59–79	3–5	Liberty Arena (3,213); Lynchburg, VA
December 6, 2022*; 7:00 p.m., ESPN+		at George Mason	L 54–67	3–6	EagleBank Arena (2,481); Fairfax, VA
December 10, 2022*; 5:30 p.m., ACCN		at No. 15 Duke	L 55–82	3–7	Cameron Indoor Stadium (9,314); Durham, NC
December 17, 2022*; 4:00 p.m., Facebook Live		Clarks Summit	W 95–55	4–7	Hytche Athletic Center (98); Princess Anne, MD
December 20, 2022*; 7:00 p.m., ESPN+		at Temple	W 86–78	5–7	Liacouras Center (3,456); Philadelphia, PA
December 28, 2022*; 4:00 p.m., ESPN+		at Columbia	W 74–67 ^{OT}	6–7	Levien Gymnasium (1,003); New York, NY
January 2, 2023*; 7:00 p.m.		St. Mary's (MD)	W 87–56	7–7	Hytche Athletic Center (101); Princess Anne, MD
January 7, 2023; 4:00 p.m.		at Norfolk State	L 46–57	7–8 (0–1)	Joseph G. Echols Memorial Hall (1,503); Norfolk, VA
January 9, 2023; 7:30 p.m.		Howard	W 82–73	8–8 (1–1)	Hytche Athletic Center (593); Princess Anne, MD
January 14, 2023; 4:00 p.m.		Delaware State	W 68–66	9–8 (2–1)	Hytche Athletic Center (799); Princess Anne, MD
January 21, 2023; 4:00 p.m.		at South Carolina State	W 76–70	10–8 (3–1)	SHM Memorial Center (842); Orangeburg, SC
January 23, 2023; 7:30 p.m.		at North Carolina Central	W 59–58	11–8 (4–1)	McDougald–McLendon Arena (1,968); Durham, NC
January 28, 2023; 4:00 p.m.		Coppin State	W 94–75	12–8 (5–1)	Hytche Athletic Center (1,033); Princess Anne, MD
January 30, 2023; 7:30 p.m.		at Morgan State	W 72–58	13–8 (6–1)	Talmadge L. Hill Field House (2,271); Baltimore, MD
February 2, 2023*; 7:00 p.m.		Regent	W 89–41	14–8	Hytche Athletic Center (923); Princess Anne, MD
February 11, 2023; 4:00 p.m.		Norfolk State	L 73–76	14–9 (6–2)	Hytche Athletic Center (2,147); Princess Anne, MD
February 13, 2023; 7:30 p.m.		at Howard	L 69–78	14–10 (6–3)	Burr Gymnasium; Washington, D.C.
February 18, 2023; 4:00 p.m.		South Carolina State	W 78–62	15–10 (7–3)	Hytche Athletic Center (967); Princess Anne, MD
February 20, 2023; 7:30 p.m.		North Carolina Central	L 63–68	15–11 (7–4)	Hytche Athletic Center (783); Princess Anne, MD
February 25, 2023; 4:00 p.m.		at Coppin State	W 78–57	16–11 (8–4)	Physical Education Complex (676); Baltimore, MD
February 27, 2023; 7:30 p.m.		Morgan State	L 61–68	16–12 (8–5)	Hytche Athletic Center (1,080); Princess Anne, MD
March 2, 2023; 7:30 p.m.		at Delaware State	W 64–58	17–12 (9–5)	Memorial Hall (1,263); Dover, DE
MEAC tournament
March 9, 2022; 6:00 p.m., ESPN+	(4)	vs. (5) Morgan State; Quarterfinals	W 80–64	18–12	Norfolk Scope; Norfolk, VA
March 10, 2022; 6:00 p.m., ESPN+	(4)	vs. (1) Howard; Semifinals	L 55–74	18–13	Norfolk Scope; Norfolk, VA
*Non-conference game. ^{#}Rankings from AP poll. (#) Tournament seedings in parentheses. All times are in Eastern.
