= 2022–23 South Carolina State Bulldogs basketball team =

American college basketball season

2022–23 South Carolina State Bulldogs basketball
- Conference: Mid-Eastern Athletic Conference
- Record: 5–26 (2–12 MEAC)
- Head coach: Erik Martin (1st season)
- Assistant coaches: Marcus Sikes; Bernard Coaxum; Matthew Bennett
- Home arena: SHM Memorial Center

2022–23 MEAC men's basketball standings
	Conf.				Overall
Team	W		L	PCT	W		L	PCT
Howard †	11	–	3	.786	22	–	13	.629
North Carolina Central	10	–	4	.714	18	–	12	.600
Norfolk State	9	–	5	.643	22	–	11	.667
Maryland Eastern Shore	9	–	5	.643	18	–	13	.581
Morgan State	7	–	7	.500	15	–	16	.484
Coppin State	4	–	10	.286	9	–	23	.281
Delaware State	4	–	10	.286	6	–	24	.200
South Carolina State	2	–	12	.143	5	–	26	.161
† 2023 MEAC tournament winner

The 2022–23 South Carolina State Bulldogs basketball team represented South Carolina State University in the 2022–23 NCAA Division I men's basketball season. The Bulldogs, led by first-year head coach Erik Martin, played their home games at SHM Memorial Center in Orangeburg, South Carolina as members of the Mid-Eastern Athletic Conference.

== Previous season ==
The Bulldogs finished the 2021–22 season 15–16, 7–7 in MEAC play to finish in fifth place. As the No. 5 seed, they were defeated by No. 4 seed Morgan State in the quarterfinals of the MEAC tournament.

On April 11, after just one year as head coach, Tony Madlock left the program to take the same position at Alabama State. On July 13, the school introduced longtime West Virginia assistant coach Erik Martin as the Bulldogs' next head coach.

== Roster ==
2022–23 South Carolina State Bulldogs men's basketball team
Players
Coaches

Pos.	#	Name	Height	Weight	Year	Hometown
G	0/3	Lesown Hallums	6 ft 2 in (1.88 m)	180 lb (82 kg)	So	Brooklyn, New York
G	1	Cameron Jones	6 ft 6 in (1.98 m)	190 lb (86 kg)	Jr	Memphis, Tennessee
G	2	Jordan Simpson	6 ft 5 in (1.96 m)	185 lb (84 kg)	Fr	Orangeburg, South Carolina
G	5	Raquan Brown	6 ft 3 in (1.91 m)	200 lb (91 kg)	Jr	Charlotte, North Carolina
G	10	Rahsaan Edwards	5 ft 11 in (1.8 m)	200 lb (91 kg)	Jr	Charles Town, West Virginia
G	11	Rakeim Gary	5 ft 10 in (1.78 m)	165 lb (75 kg)	Jr	Dallas, Texas
G	12	DaJuan "DJ" Bates	6 ft 1 in (1.85 m)	170 lb (77 kg)	Fr	Chicago, Illinois
F	14	Isaiah Turner	6 ft 10 in (2.08 m)	240 lb (109 kg)	Jr	Auburndale, Florida
G	20	Marc Wardlaw	5 ft 9 in (1.75 m)	170 lb (77 kg)	Jr	Vidalia, Georgia
G	24	Shaman Alston	6 ft 4 in (1.93 m)	185 lb (84 kg)	Jr	Columbia, South Carolina
F	34	Justin Wilson	6 ft 8 in (2.03 m)	215 lb (98 kg)	Jr	Dallas, Texas
C	42	Dallas James	7 ft 0 in (2.13 m)	200 lb (91 kg)	So	Artesia, California
F	55	Davion Everett	6 ft 6 in (1.98 m)	215 lb (98 kg)	So	Columbia, South Carolina

Head coach

- Erik Martin (Cincinnati)

Assistant coach(es)

- Marcus Sikes (Cincinnati)
- Bernard Coaxum (College of Charleston)
- Matthew Bennett

Legend

- (C) Team captain
- (S) Suspended
- (I) Ineligible
- (W) Walk-on
- Injured
- Current redshirt

Roster
Last update: December 26, 2022

== Schedule and results ==
Date time, TV	Rank^{#}	Opponent^{#}	Result	Record	High points	High rebounds	High assists	Site (attendance) city, state
Exhibition
November 1, 2022*; 7:00 pm		West Virginia Tech	W 78–63	–	16 – Edwards	7 – Hallums	6 – Jones	SHM Memorial Center (515); Orangeburg, SC
Non-conference regular season
November 8, 2022*; 7:00 pm, SECN		at South Carolina	L 77–80	0–1	20 – Hallums	7 – Edwards	4 – Edwards	Colonial Life Arena; Columbia, SC
November 12, 2022*; 12:00 pm, ESPN+		at Tennessee State	L 61–80	0–2	14 – Hallums	8 – Everett	2 – 3 Tied	Gentry Complex (1,307); Nashville, TN
November 14, 2022*; 7:00 pm, CBSSN		at Duquesne; MTE Classic	L 71–96	0–3	15 – Everett	9 – Everett	3 – Simpson	UPMC Cooper Fieldhouse (2,186); Pittsburgh, PA
November 17, 2022*; 7:00 pm, SECN		at No. 4 Kentucky; MTE Classic	L 63–106	0–4	13 – Gary	6 – Everett	2 – 2 Tied	Rupp Arena (18,885); Lexington, KY
November 19, 2022*; 5:00 pm, ESPN+		at North Florida; MTE Classic	L 66–72	0–5	15 – Gary	8 – 2 Tied	2 – Edwards	UNF Arena (2,159); Jacksonville, FL
November 23, 2022*; 8:30 pm, ACCN		at Wake Forest	L 74–105	0–6	14 – Hallums	4 – 5 Tied	3 – 2 Tied	LJVM Coliseum (5,760); Winston-Salem, NC
November 26, 2022*; 4:00 pm, ESPN+		at Western Kentucky	L 64–90	0–7	21 – Hallums	4 – 3 Tied	4 – Jones	E. A. Diddle Arena (3,365); Bowling Green, KY
November 29, 2022*; 7:00 pm, ESPN+		at East Carolina	W 73–68	1–7	22 – Hallums	9 – Everett	2 – 2 Tied	Williams Arena (3,850); Greenville, NC
December 3, 2022*; 12:00 pm, ESPN+		at Furman	L 76–88	1–8	14 – Simpson	7 – Jones	6 – Alston	Timmons Arena (1,847); Greenville, SC
December 6, 2022*; 7:00 pm, ESPN+		at Winthrop	L 67–81	1–9	12 – Simpson	7 – Brown	6 – Gary	Winthrop Coliseum (818); Rock Hill, SC
December 10, 2022*; 3:00 pm, ESPN+		at USC Upstate	L 84–89 ^{OT}	1–10	21 – Edwards	12 – Everett	3 – Alston	G. B. Hodge Center (417); Spartanburg, SC
December 13, 2022*; 7:00 pm		UNC Asheville	L 84–94	1–11	17 – Gary	12 – Everett	5 – 2 Tied	SHM Memorial Center (505); Orangeburg, SC
December 17, 2022*; 3:00 pm		Samford	W 62–61	2–11	20 – Gary	8 – Brown	4 – 2 Tied	SHM Memorial Center (300); Orangeburg, SC
December 20, 2022*; 2:00 pm, ESPN+		at Longwood	L 77–104	2–12	21 – 2 Tied	5 – 2 Tied	4 – Gary	Willett Hall (353); Farmville, VA
December 27, 2022*; 8:00 pm, ESPN+		at Texas Tech	L 71–110	2–13	17 – Brown	7 – James	4 – Gary	United Supermarkets Arena (13,473); Lubbock, TX
December 30, 2022*; 4:00 pm		St. Andrews	W 111–58	3–13	17 – 2 Tied	10 – Brown	4 – Lawrence	SHM Memorial Center (175); Orangeburg, SC
MEAC regular season
January 7, 2023; 4:00 pm		at Coppin State	L 73–85	3–14 (0–1)	17 – Hallums	9 – Brown	5 – Gary	Physical Education Complex (214); Baltimore, MD
January 9, 2023; 7:30 pm		at Morgan State	L 85–90	3–15 (0–2)	15 – Gary	7 – Simpson	3 – Gary	Talmadge L. Hill Field House; Baltimore, MD
January 14, 2023; 4:00 pm		at North Carolina Central	L 67–71	3–16 (0–3)	13 – Simpson	5 – Simpson	7 – Jones	McDougald–McLendon Arena (2,477); Durham, NC
January 21, 2023; 4:00 pm		Maryland Eastern Shore	L 70–76	3–17 (0–4)	14 – Gary	4 – Tied	3 – Tied	SHM Memorial Center (842); Orangeburg, SC
January 23, 2023; 7:30 pm		Delaware State	L 85–88 ^{OT}	3–18 (0–5)	18 – Gary	10 – Everett	6 – Gary	SHM Memorial Center (425); Orangeburg, SC
January 28, 2023; 4:00 pm		at Norfolk State	L 68–82	3–19 (0–6)	17 – Simpson	8 – Simpson	4 – Simpson	Joseph G. Echols Memorial Hall (3,177); Norfolk, VA
January 30, 2023; 7:30 pm		at Howard	L 74–100	3–20 (0–7)	13 – Gary	5 – Brown	3 – Hallums	Burr Gymnasium (2,359); Washington, D.C.
February 11, 2023; 4:00 pm		Coppin State	W 94–84	4–20 (1–7)	18 – Lawrence	5 – Tied	8 – Hallums	SHM Memorial Center (522); Orangeburg, SC
February 13, 2023; 7:30 pm		Morgan State	W 74–62	5–20 (2–7)	13 – Wilson	11 – Wilson	5 – Edwards	SHM Memorial Center (575); Orangeburg, SC
February 18, 2023; 4:00 pm		at Maryland Eastern Shore	L 62–78	5–21 (2–8)	18 – Gary	4 – Tied	3 – Tied	Hytche Athletic Center (967); Princess Anne, MD
February 20, 2023; 7:30 pm		at Delaware State	L 68–69	5–22 (2–9)	14 – Tied	7 – Everett	3 – Tied	Memorial Hall (1,137); Dover, DE
February 25, 2023; 4:00 pm		Norfolk State	L 76–88	5–23 (2–10)	15 – Jones	6 – Tied	4 – Tied	SHM Memorial Center (527); Orangeburg, SC
February 27, 2023; 7:30 pm		Howard	L 78–82	5–24 (2–11)	16 – Gary	8 – Everett	4 – Edwards	SHM Memorial Center (498); Orangeburg, SC
March 2, 2023; 7:30 pm		North Carolina Central	L 64–71	5–25 (2–12)	13 – Hallums	6 – Tied	4 – Gary	SHM Memorial Center (827); Orangeburg, SC
MEAC tournament
March 8, 2022; 6:00 pm, ESPN+	(8)	vs. (1) Howard; Quarterfinals	L 55–91	5–26	14 – Jones	9 – Everett	3 – Gary	Norfolk Scope; Norfolk, VA
*Non-conference game. ^{#}Rankings from AP Poll. (#) Tournament seedings in parentheses. All times are in Eastern.
