= 2023 MEAC men's basketball tournament =

US collegiate basketball tournament

- Classification: Division I
- Season: 2022–23
- Teams: 8
- Site: Norfolk Scope; Norfolk, Virginia
- Television: ESPN+, ESPN2

2022–23 MEAC men's basketball standings
	Conf.				Overall
Team	W		L	PCT	W		L	PCT
Howard †	11	–	3	.786	22	–	13	.629
North Carolina Central	10	–	4	.714	18	–	12	.600
Norfolk State	9	–	5	.643	22	–	11	.667
Maryland Eastern Shore	9	–	5	.643	18	–	13	.581
Morgan State	7	–	7	.500	15	–	16	.484
Coppin State	4	–	10	.286	9	–	23	.281
Delaware State	4	–	10	.286	6	–	24	.200
South Carolina State	2	–	12	.143	5	–	26	.161
† 2023 MEAC tournament winner

The 2023 MEAC men's basketball tournament is the postseason men's basketball tournament for the 2022–23 season in the Mid-Eastern Athletic Conference (MEAC). The tournament took place from March 8–11, 2023. The tournament winner received the conference's automatic invitation to the 2023 NCAA Division I men's basketball tournament.

== Seeds ==
All 8 teams are eligible and will be seeded by record within the conference, with a tiebreaker system to seed teams with identical conference records.

Seed	School	Conference	Tiebreaker
1	Howard	11–3	
2	North Carolina Central	10–4	
3	Norfolk State	9–5	2–0 vs. Maryland Eastern Shore
4	Maryland Eastern Shore	9–5	0–2 vs. Norfolk State
5	Morgan State	7–7	
6	Coppin State	4–10	1–3 vs. Norfolk State/Maryland Eastern Shore
7	Delaware State	4–10	0–4 vs. Norfolk State/Maryland Eastern Shore
8	South Carolina State	2–12	

== Schedule ==
Game	Time*	Matchup^{#}	Score	Television
Quarterfinals – Wednesday, March 8, 2023
1	6:00 p.m.	No. 1 Howard vs. No. 8 South Carolina State	91–55	ESPN+
2	8:00 p.m.	No. 2 North Carolina Central vs. No. 7 Delaware State	89–59	ESPN+
Quarterfinals – Thursday, March 9, 2023
3	6:00 p.m.	No. 4 Maryland Eastern Shore vs. No. 5 Morgan State	80–64	ESPN+
4	8:00 p.m.	No. 3 Norfolk State vs. No. 6 Coppin State	73–56	ESPN+
Semifinals – Friday, March 10, 2023
5	6:00 p.m.	No. 1 Howard vs. No. 4 Maryland Eastern Shore	74–55	ESPN+
6	8:00 p.m.	No. 2 North Carolina Central vs. No. 3 Norfolk State	65–72^{OT}	ESPN+
Championship – Saturday, March 11, 2023
7	1:00 p.m.	No. 1 Howard vs. No. 3 Norfolk State	65-64	ESPN2
*Game times in EST. #-Rankings denote tournament seeding.

== Bracket ==
Quarterfinals; March 8–9; ESPN+
1	Howard	91
8	South Carolina State	55
4	UMES	80
5	Morgan State	64
2	North Carolina Central	89
7	Delaware State	59
3	Norfolk State	73
6	Coppin State	56

Semifinals; March 10; ESPN+
1	Howard	74
4	UMES	55
2	North Carolina Central	65
3	Norfolk State	72*

Championship; March 11; ESPN2
1	Howard	65
3	Norfolk State	64

* denotes overtime period
