= Akil Blount =

American football player (born 1994)

Profile
- Position: Linebacker

Personal information
- Born: July 2, 1994 (age 32); Pittsburgh, Pennsylvania, U.S.
- Listed height: 6 ft 2 in (1.88 m)
- Listed weight: 249 lb (113 kg)

Career information
- High school: Wheeling (WV) Linsly
- College: Florida A&M
- NFL draft: 2016: undrafted

Career history
- Miami Dolphins (2016)*; Pittsburgh Steelers (2017)*; Orlando Apollos (2019)
- * Offseason or practice squad member only
- Stats at Pro Football Reference

Akil Blount (born July 2, 1994) is an American former football linebacker. He was signed by the Miami Dolphins as an undrafted free agent in 2016 and played college football at Florida A&M.

== Professional career ==
Pre-draft measurables
Height	Weight	Arm length	Hand span	40-yard dash	10-yard split	20-yard split	20-yard shuttle	Three-cone drill	Vertical jump	Broad jump	Bench press
6 ft 2 1/4 in (1.89 m)	245 lb (111 kg)	33 in (0.84 m)	9 in (0.23 m)	4.61 s	1.63 s	2.50 s	4.24 s	7.15 s	40.0 in (1.02 m)	9 ft 5 in (2.87 m)	30 reps
All values from Pro Day

=== Miami Dolphins ===
Blount was signed by the Miami Dolphins as an undrafted free agent following the 2016 NFL draft. On August 27, 2016, Blount was waived by the Dolphins.

=== Pittsburgh Steelers ===
On February 14, 2017, Blount was signed by the Pittsburgh Steelers. He was released by the Steelers on May 17, 2017.

=== Orlando Apollos ===
Blount signed with the Orlando Apollos of the Alliance of American Football for the 2019 season.

== Personal life ==
Blount is the son of Hall of Fame cornerback Mel Blount. He is also the father of Akilah Blount.
