= 2022–23 North Carolina Central Eagles men's basketball team =

American college basketball season

2022–23 North Carolina Central Eagles men's basketball
- Conference: Mid-Eastern Athletic Conference
- Record: 18–12 (10–4 MEAC)
- Head coach: LeVelle Moton (14th season)
- Assistant coaches: Garrett Bridges; Reggie Sharp; Nigel Thomas
- Home arena: McDougald–McLendon Arena

2022–23 MEAC men's basketball standings
	Conf.				Overall
Team	W		L	PCT	W		L	PCT
Howard †	11	–	3	.786	22	–	13	.629
North Carolina Central	10	–	4	.714	18	–	12	.600
Norfolk State	9	–	5	.643	22	–	11	.667
Maryland Eastern Shore	9	–	5	.643	18	–	13	.581
Morgan State	7	–	7	.500	15	–	16	.484
Coppin State	4	–	10	.286	9	–	23	.281
Delaware State	4	–	10	.286	6	–	24	.200
South Carolina State	2	–	12	.143	5	–	26	.161
† 2023 MEAC tournament winner

The 2022–23 North Carolina Central Eagles men's basketball team represented North Carolina Central University in the 2022–23 NCAA Division I men's basketball season. The Eagles, led by 14th-year head coach LeVelle Moton, played their home games at McDougald–McLendon Arena in Durham, North Carolina as members of the Mid-Eastern Athletic Conference.

== Previous season ==
The Eagles finished the 2021–22 season 16–15, 8–5 in MEAC play to finish in third place. They defeated Maryland Eastern Shore in the quarterfinals of the MEAC tournament, before being upset by #7 seed Coppin State in the semifinals.

== Roster ==
2022–23 North Carolina Central Eagles men's basketball team
Players
Coaches

Pos.	#	Name	Height	Weight	Year	Hometown
G	0	Fred Cleveland Jr.	5 ft 9 in (1.75 m)	165 lb (75 kg)	Jr	Chicago, Illinois
G	1	Ja'Darius Harris	6 ft 2 in (1.88 m)	175 lb (79 kg)	RS Jr	Trenton, Tennessee
F	2	Kris Monroe	6 ft 8 in (2.03 m)	212 lb (96 kg)	RS Sr	Raleigh, North Carolina
G	4	Shakir Dawan	5 ft 9 in (1.75 m)	165 lb (75 kg)	So	Hampton, Virginia
G	5	Justin Wright	6 ft 2 in (1.88 m)	195 lb (88 kg)	Jr	Greenville, North Carolina
F	10	Devin Gordon	6 ft 4 in (1.93 m)	205 lb (93 kg)	So	Powder Springs, Georgia
G	11	Marque Maultsby	6 ft 3 in (1.91 m)	165 lb (75 kg)	Sr	Raleigh, North Carolina
G	13	Terrence Crawford	6 ft 2 in (1.88 m)	170 lb (77 kg)	So	Graham, North Carolina
F	21	Eric Boone	6 ft 2 in (1.88 m)	190 lb (86 kg)	Sr	Lexington, Kentucky
G	22	Chris Daniels	6 ft 1 in (1.85 m)	175 lb (79 kg)	So	Raleigh, North Carolina
F	23	Cameron Butler	6 ft 10 in (2.08 m)	205 lb (93 kg)	Sr	Chicago, Illinois
G/F	24	Nicolas Fennell	6 ft 4 in (1.93 m)	170 lb (77 kg)	GS	Bowie, Maryland
F	25	Timmy Adedire	6 ft 3 in (1.91 m)	205 lb (93 kg)	So	Baltimore, Maryland
C	35	Brendan Medley-Bacon	7 ft 0 in (2.13 m)	235 lb (107 kg)	GS	Baltimore, Maryland
F	44	Dan Oladapo	6 ft 8 in (2.03 m)	225 lb (102 kg)	Sr	Bladensburg, Maryland
F	52	Devin Butts	6 ft 5 in (1.96 m)	180 lb (82 kg)	Jr	Macon, Georgia

Head coach

- LeVelle Moton (North Carolina Central)

Assistant coach(es)

- Garrett Bridges (St. Augustine's)
- Reggie Sharp (Auburn)
- Nigel Thomas (Langston)

Legend

- (C) Team captain
- (S) Suspended
- (I) Ineligible
- (W) Walk-on
- Injured
- Current redshirt

Roster
Last update: November 28, 2022

== Schedule and results ==
Date time, TV	Rank^{#}	Opponent^{#}	Result	Record	High points	High rebounds	High assists	Site (attendance) city, state
Non-conference regular season
November 7, 2022*; 9:00 pm, ACCRSN/BSSO		at No. 18 Virginia	L 61–73	0–1	20 – Wright	6 – Medley-Bacon	3 – Boone	John Paul Jones Arena (13,238); Charlottesville, VA
November 10, 2022*; 6:30 pm, ESPN+		at Appalachian State	L 74–79 ^{OT}	0–2	17 – Wright	8 – Boone	5 – Boone	Holmes Center (2,145); Boone, NC
November 14, 2022*; 7:00 pm, ESPN+		at Liberty	L 63–79	0–3	16 – Wright	5 – 2 Tied	4 – Boone	Liberty Arena (3,262); Lynchburg, VA
November 16, 2022*; 7:00 pm		Mid-Atlantic Christian	W 109–50	1–3	22 – Wright	9 – Oladapo	8 – Boone	McDougald–McLendon Arena (1,368); Durham, NC
November 20, 2022*; 3:00 pm		Montreat	W 86–70	2–3	17 – Maultsby	13 – Monroe	9 – Boone	McDougald–McLendon Arena (1,088); Durham, NC
November 26, 2022*; 3:30 pm, HBCU GO		Gardner–Webb	W 58–53	3–3	13 – 2 Tied	7 – Wright	2 – 2 Tied	McDougald–McLendon Arena (1,242); Durham, NC
November 29, 2022*; 7:00 pm		UNC Asheville	W 79–66	4–3	23 – Monroe	11 – Medley-Bacon	7 – Boone	McDougald–McLendon Arena (1,663); Durham, NC
December 1, 2022*; 7:00 pm, ESPN+		at Radford	L 78–80	4–4	23 – Monroe	11 – Monroe	6 – Cleveland Jr.	Dedmon Center (1,213); Radford, VA
December 3, 2022*; 3:30 pm, HBCU GO		St. Andrews	W 127–40	5–4	18 – Harris	10 – Butler	7 – 2 Tied	McDougald–McLendon Arena (1,073); Durham, NC
December 6, 2022*; 8:30 pm, FS1		at Marquette	L 78–90	5–5	18 – Wright	8 – Monroe	8 – Cleveland Jr.	Fiserv Forum (12,244); Milwaukee, WI
December 13, 2022*; 7:00 pm, SECN		at LSU	L 57–67	5–6	14 – Wright	6 – Boone	8 – Boone	Pete Maravich Assembly Center (8,212); Baton Rouge, LA
December 17, 2022*; 2:00 pm, ESPN+		at Gardner–Webb	L 70–72	5–7	19 – Medley-Bacon	7 – Medley-Bacon	7 – Boone	Paul Porter Arena (247); Boiling Springs, NC
December 20, 2022*; 7:00 pm, NCCU Sports Network		The Citadel	W 81–74	6–7	24 – Wright	9 – Oladapo	3 – 2 Tied	McDougald–McLendon Arena (1,033); Durham, NC
January 3, 2023*; 7:00 pm, NCCU Sports Network		Toccoa Falls	W 98–52	7–7	16 – Butts	13 – Oladapo	5 – 2 Tied	McDougald–McLendon Arena (832); Durham, NC
MEAC regular season
January 7, 2023; 4:00 pm		at Morgan State	L 73–78	7–8 (0–1)	19 – Monroe	6 – Oladapo	4 – Boone	Talmadge L. Hill Field House (937); Baltimore, MD
January 9, 2023; 7:30 pm		at Coppin State	W 64–59	8–8 (1–1)	21 – Wright	10 – Monroe	3 – Tied	Physical Education Complex (317); Baltimore, MD
January 14, 2023; 4:00 pm, NCCU Sports Network		South Carolina State	W 71–67	9–8 (2–1)	17 – Boone	8 – Tied	6 – Boone	McDougald–McLendon Arena (2,477); Durham, NC
January 21, 2023; 4:00 pm, NCCU Sports Network		Delaware State	W 74–55	9–9 (2–2)	21 – Medley-Bacon	13 – Monroe	7 – Boone	McDougald–McLendon Arena (2,669); Durham, NC
January 23, 2023; 7:30 pm, NCCU Sports Network		Maryland Eastern Shore	L 58–59	10–9 (3–2)	19 – Wright	13 – Boone	6 – Boone	McDougald–McLendon Arena (1,968); Durham, NC
January 28, 2023; 6:00 pm, ESPNU		at Howard	L 67–71	10–10 (3–3)	15 – Medley-Bacon	7 – Wright	6 – Boone	Burr Gymnasium (2,695); Washington, D.C.
January 30, 2023; 7:00 pm, ESPNU		at Norfolk State	L 71–77	10–11 (3–4)	21 – Wright	7 – Medley-Bacon	5 – Cleveland Jr.	Joseph G. Echols Memorial Hall (3,437); Norfolk, VA
February 11, 2023; 4:00 pm, NCCU Sports Network		Morgan State	W 83–63	11–11 (4–4)	25 – Wright	11 – Wright	6 – Boone	McDougald–McLendon Arena (2,686); Durham, NC
February 13, 2023; 7:30 pm, NCCU Sports Network		Coppin State	W 85–52	12–11 (5–4)	25 – Monroe	16 – Monroe	6 – Boone	McDougald–McLendon Arena (3,173); Durham, NC
February 18, 2023; 4:00 pm		at Delaware State	W 66–58	13–11 (6–4)	14 – Wright	6 – Tied	4 – Cleveland Jr.	Memorial Hall (1,507); Dover, DE
February 20, 2023; 7:30 pm		at Maryland Eastern Shore	W 68–63	14–11 (7–4)	19 – Wright	9 – Boone	12 – Boone	Hytche Athletic Center (783); Princess Anne, MD
February 25, 2023; 4:00 pm, NCCU Sports Network		Howard	W 68–60	15–11 (8–4)	24 – Wright	7 – Tied	5 – Boone	McDougald–McLendon Arena (3,122); Durham, NC
February 27, 2023; 7:30 pm, NCCU Sports Network		Norfolk State	W 76–75 ^{OT}	16–11 (9–4)	20 – Wright	6 – Wright	4 – Boone	McDougald–McLendon Arena (2,999); Durham, NC
March 2, 2023; 7:30 pm		at South Carolina State	W 71–64	17–11 (10–4)	16 – Medley-Bacon	7 – Tied	3 – Tied	SHM Memorial Center (827); Orangeburg, SC
MEAC tournament
March 8, 2022; 8:00 pm, ESPN+	(2)	vs. (7) Delaware State; Quarterfinals	W 89–59	18–11	23 – Wright	7 – Wright	6 – Boone	Norfolk Scope; Norfolk, VA
March 10, 2022; 8:00 pm, ESPN+	(2)	vs. (3) Norfolk State; Semifinals	L 65–72 ^{OT}	18–12	13 – Tied	7 – Wright	4 – Wright	Norfolk Scope; Norfolk, VA
*Non-conference game. ^{#}Rankings from AP Poll. (#) Tournament seedings in parentheses. All times are in Eastern.
