= Buffalo Township, Washington County, Pennsylvania =

Township in Pennsylvania, US

Coordinates: 40°8′28.4″N 80°21′16.27″W

Buffalo Township
- Township
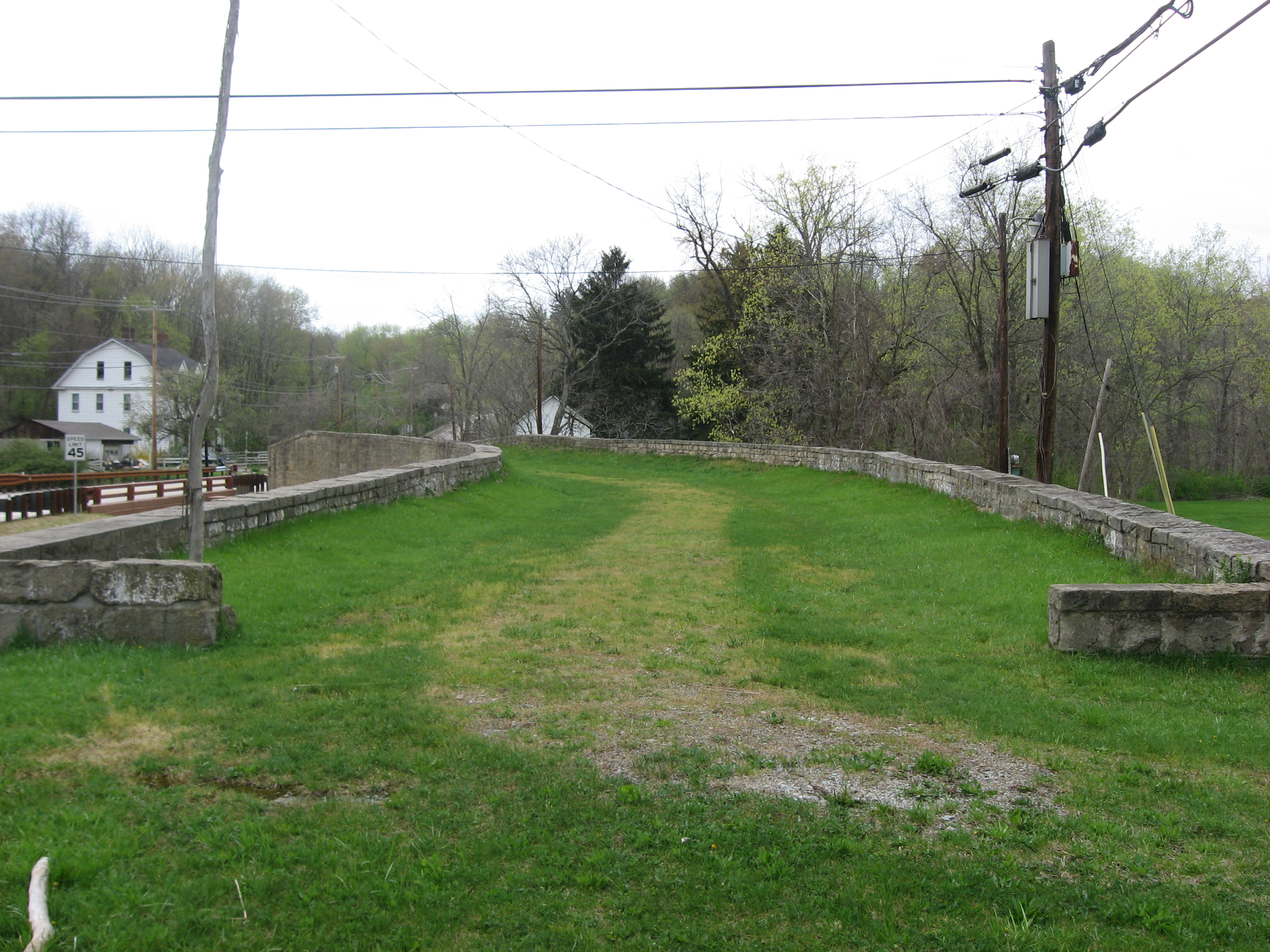
- The Claysville S Bridge, a historic site in the township

- Logo

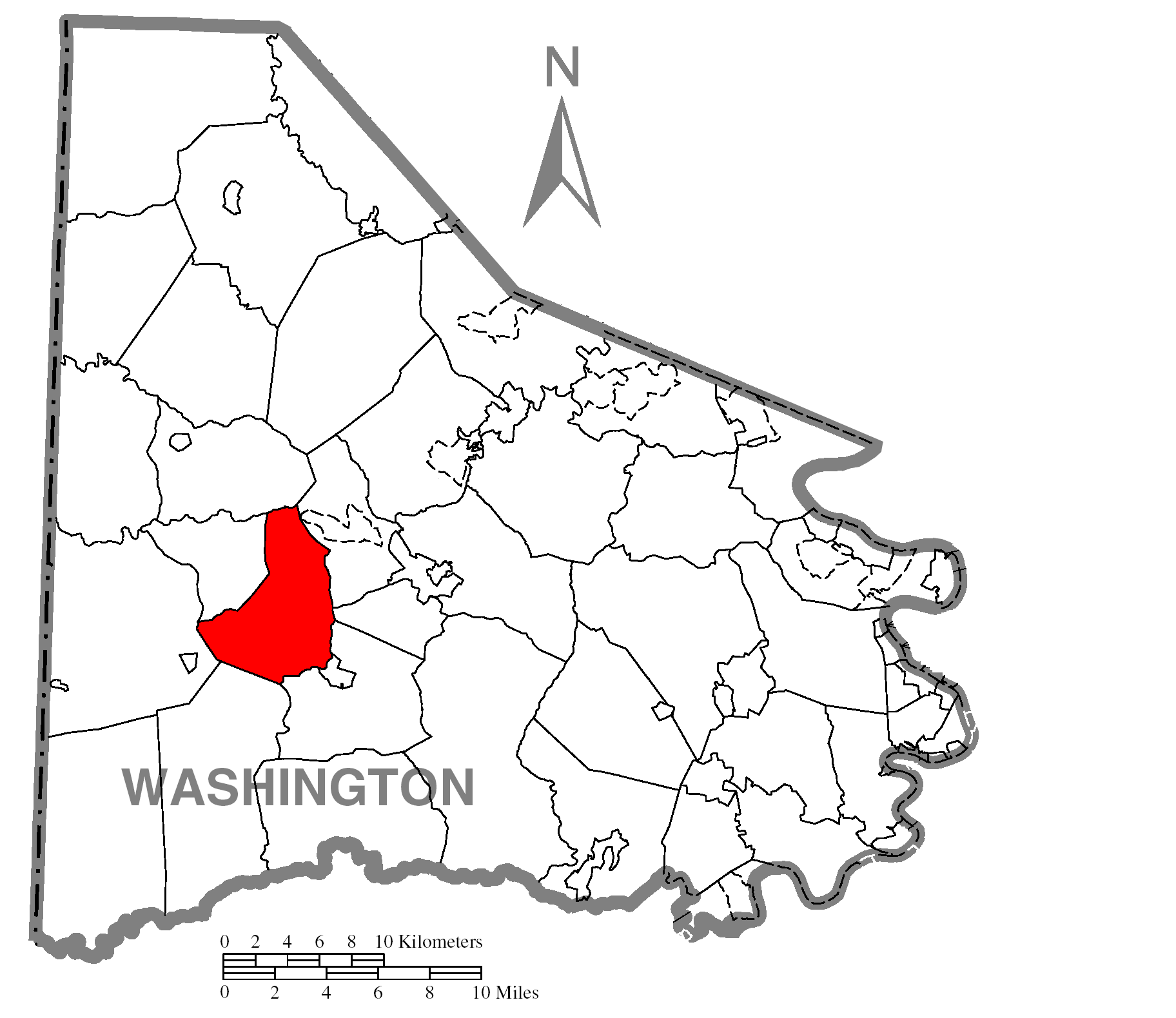
- Location of Buffalo Township in Washington County

- Location of Washington County in Pennsylvania
- Country: United States
- State: Pennsylvania
- County: Washington

Area
  - Total: 20.37 sq mi (52.76 km^{2})
  - Land: 20.36 sq mi (52.74 km^{2})
  - Water: 0.0077 sq mi (0.02 km^{2})

Population (2020)
  - Total: 1,984 ▼
  - Estimate (2023): 1,957
  - Density: 101.0/sq mi (38.99/km^{2})
- Time zone: UTC-4 (EST)
  - Summer (DST): UTC-5 (EDT)
- Area code: 724
- FIPS code: 42-125-10032
- Website: buffalotwp.com

Historical population
Census	Pop.	Note	%±
2000	2,100		—
2010	2,069		−1.5%
2020	1,984		−4.1%
2025 (est.)	1,966		−0.9%
U.S. Decennial Census

Buffalo Township is a township in Washington County, Pennsylvania, United States. The population was 1,984 at the 2020 census.

== History ==
The Caldwell Tavern, "S" Bridge, and Levi Wilson Tavern are listed on the National Register of Historic Places. It is home to the Mel Blount Youth Home.

== Geography ==
According to the United States Census Bureau, the township has a total area of 20.4 square miles (53 km^{2}), of which 20.3 square miles (53 km^{2}) is land and 0.05% is water.

== Demographics ==
As of the census of 2000, there were 2,100 people, 763 households, and 615 families living in the township. The population density was 103.2 people per square mile (39.8 people/km^{2}). There were 803 housing units at an average density of 39.5 per square mile (15.3/km^{2}). The racial makeup of the township was 98.90% White, 0.14% African American, 0.10% Native American, 0.19% Asian, 0.14% from other races, and 0.52% from two or more races. Hispanic or Latino of any race were 0.33% of the population.

There were 763 households, out of which 33.6% had children under the age of 18 living with them, 68.8% were married couples living together, 8.5% had a female householder with no husband present, and 19.3% were non-families. 16.6% of all households were made up of individuals, and 7.7% had someone living alone who was 65 years of age or older. The average household size was 2.68 and the average family size was 2.99.

In the township the population was spread out, with 22.8% under the age of 18, 7.0% from 18 to 24, 27.1% from 25 to 44, 29.0% from 45 to 64, and 14.2% who were 65 years of age or older. The median age was 42 years. For every 100 females, there were 93.5 males. For every 100 females age 18 and over, there were 95.7 males.

The median income for a household in the township was $44,167, and the median income for a family was $51,118. Males had a median income of $34,648 versus $21,750 for females. The per capita income for the township was $18,417. About 3.2% of families and 3.0% of the population were below the poverty line, including 1.9% of those under age 18 and 2.5% of those age 65 or over.
