= 2021–22 Metro Atlantic Athletic Conference men's basketball season =

- League: NCAA Division I
- Sport: Basketball
- Duration: November 9, 2021–March 27, 2022
- Teams: 11
- TV partner(s): ESPN2, ESPN3, ESPNU, ESPN+

Regular season
- Regular season champions: Iona Gaels
- Runners-up: Saint Peter's Peacocks
- Season MVP: Tyson Jolly (Iona)
- Top scorer: Jose Perez (Manhattan) 18.9

2022 MAAC Tournament
- Champions: Saint Peter's Peacocks
- Runners-up: Monmouth Hawks
- Tournament MVP: KC Ndefo (Saint Peter's)

Metro Atlantic Athletic Conference men's basketball seasons
- ← 2020–21 2022–23 →

2021–22 MAAC men's basketball standings
	Conf.				Overall
Team	W		L	PCT	W		L	PCT
Iona	17	–	3	.850	25	–	8	.758
Saint Peter's †	14	–	6	.700	22	–	12	.647
Siena	12	–	8	.600	15	–	14	.517
Monmouth	11	–	9	.550	21	–	13	.618
Niagara	9	–	11	.450	14	–	16	.467
Marist	9	–	11	.450	14	–	16	.467
Fairfield	8	–	12	.400	15	–	18	.455
Manhattan	8	–	12	.400	15	–	15	.500
Rider	8	–	12	.400	14	–	19	.424
Canisius	7	–	13	.350	11	–	21	.344
Quinnipiac	7	–	13	.350	14	–	17	.452
† 2022 MAAC tournament winner

The 2021–22 Metro Atlantic Athletic Conference (MAAC) men's basketball season began with practices in October 2021, followed by the start of the 2021–22 NCAA Division I men's basketball season on November 9. Conference play started in December and concluded in March 2022. This was the 41st season of MAAC basketball.

The 2022 MAAC tournament was held from March 8 through March 13 at the Jim Whelan Boardwalk Hall in Atlantic City, New Jersey for the third year in a row. Saint Peter's defeated Monmouth in the championship to win the conference's automatic bid to the 2022 NCAA tournament for the first time since 2011. Saint Peter's received a No. 15 seed in the NCAA tournament East Region, and faced No. 2 seed Kentucky in the first round. They became the tenth No. 15 seed on record to upset a No. 2 seed in the NCAA tournament with a shocking 85–79 victory in overtime. Advancing to the second round, they took on No. 7 seed Murray State, winning that game 70–60, and became the third No. 15 seed to advance to the Sweet 16. At the same time, they became the first MAAC men's basketball program to ever advance to the Sweet 16 as well. In the Sweet Sixteen, Saint Peter's would become the first ever No. 15 seed to advance to the Elite Eight after beating No. 3 seed Purdue 67–64. Their magical season would come to an end in the Elite Eight, with a loss to No. 8 seed North Carolina 49–69.

This was the final MAAC season for Monmouth, which joins the Colonial Athletic Association on July 1, 2022. On May 2, 2022, it was announced that Mount St. Mary's will leave the Northeast Conference and join the MAAC, replacing Monmouth on the same date.

== Head coaches ==
=== Coaching changes ===
No coaching changes occurred in the offseason.

=== Coaches ===
Team	Head coach	Previous job	Years at school	Overall record	MAAC record	MAAC titles	MAAC Tourney titles	NCAA Tournaments
Canisius	Reggie Witherspoon	Chattanooga (asst.)	6	73–71 (.507)	50–38 (.568)	1	0	0
Fairfield	Jay Young	Rutgers (asst.)	3	22–37 (.373)	15–23 (.395)	0	0	0
Iona	Rick Pitino	Louisville	2	12–6 (.667)	6–3 (.667)	0	1	1
Manhattan	Steve Masiello	Louisville (asst.)	11	147–162 (.476)	94–96 (.495)	0	2	2
Marist	John Dunne	Saint Peter's	4	31–51 (.378)	23–33 (.411)	0	0	0
Monmouth	King Rice	Vanderbilt (asst.)	11	161–154 (.511)	94–60 (.610)	3	0	0
Niagara	Greg Paulus	George Washington (asst.)	3	21–31 (.404)	16–20 (.444)	0	0	0
Quinnipiac	Baker Dunleavy	Villanova (asst.)	5	52–64 (.448)	35–38 (.479)	0	0	0
Rider	Kevin Baggett	Rider (assoc. HC)	10	147–133 (.525)	97–75 (.564)	1	0	0
Saint Peter's	Shaheen Holloway	Seton Hall (asst.)	4	42–44 (.488)	30–26 (.536)	0	0	0
Siena	Carmen Maciariello	Siena (asst.)	3	32–15 (.681)	27–9 (.750)	2	0	0

Notes:

- All records, appearances, titles, etc. are from time with current school only.
- Year at school includes 2021–22 season.
- Overall and MAAC/NCAA records are from time at current school and are before the beginning of the 2021–22 season.
- Previous jobs are head coaching jobs unless otherwise noted.

== Preseason ==
=== Preseason Coaches Poll ===
Rank	Team
1.	Iona (11)
2.	Saint Peter's
3.	Marist
4.	Monmouth
5.	Rider
6.	Fairfield
7.	Manhattan
8.	Siena
9.	Quinnipiac
10.	Niagara
11.	Canisius

( ) first place votes

=== Preseason All-MAAC teams ===
2021–22 MAAC Men's Basketball Preseason All-MAAC Teams
First Team	Second Team	Third Team
F– Nelly Junior Joseph – Iona; G– George Papas – Monmouth; G– Marcus Hammond – Niagara; G– Dwight Murray, Jr. – Rider; F– KC Ndefo – Saint Peter's	F– Warren Williams – Manhattan; F– Jacob Rigoni – Quinnipiac; F– Kevin Marfo – Quinnipiac; F– Dimencio Vaughn – Rider; G– Daryl Banks III – Saint Peter's	F– Malek Green – Canisius; G– Jake Wojcik – Fairfield; G– Ant Nelson – Manhattan; G– Ricardo Wright – Marist; G– Shavar Reynolds Jr. – Monmouth

† denotes unanimous selection

=== Preseason Player of the Year ===
Recipient	School
KC Ndefo	Saint Peter's

== MAAC regular season ==
=== Conference matrix ===
This table summarizes the final head-to-head results between teams in conference play. *Completed for 2021–2022 season*

	Canisius	Fairfield	Iona	Manhattan	Marist	Monmouth	Niagara	Quinnipiac	Rider	Saint Peter's	Siena
vs. Canisius		2–0	2–0	1–1	1–1	2–0	2–0	0–2	1–1	1–1	1–1
vs. Fairfield	0–2		2–0	1–1	1–1	2–0	0–2	2–0	0–2	2–0	2–0
vs. Iona	0–2	0–2		1–1	0–2	0–2	1–1	0–2	0–2	0–2	1–1
vs. Manhattan	1–1	1–1	1–1		1–1	2–0	2–0	1–1	1–1	2–0	0–2
vs. Marist	1–1	1–1	2–0	1–1		0–2	1–1	1–1	1–1	2–0	1–1
vs. Monmouth	0–2	0–2	2–0	0–2	2–0		1–1	0–2	1–1	2–0	1–1
vs. Niagara	0–2	2–0	1–1	0–2	1–1	1–1		1–1	2–0	2–0	1–1
vs. Quinnipiac	2–0	0–2	2–0	1–1	1–1	2–0	1–1		0–2	2–0	2–0
vs. Rider	1–1	2–0	2–0	1–1	1–1	1–1	0–2	2–0		1–1	1–1
vs. Saint Peter's	1–1	1–1	2–0	0–2	0–2	0–2	0–2	0–2	1–1		2–0
vs. Siena	1–1	0–2	1–1	2–0	1–1	1–1	1–1	0–2	1–1	0–2	
Total	7–13	8–12	17–3	8–12	9–11	11–9	8–12	7–13	8–12	14–6	12–8

=== Player of the week ===
Throughout the regular season, the Metro Atlantic Athletic Conference offices named player(s) of the week and rookie(s) of the week.

Week	Player of the week	Rookie of the week
November 15, 2021	Marcus Hammond, Niagara	TJ Long, Fairfield
November 22, 2021	George Papas, Monmouth	Corey McKeithan, Rider
November 29, 2021	Nelly Junior Joseph, Iona	TJ Long (2), Fairfield
December 6, 2021	George Papas (2), Monmouth	Jao Ituka, Marist
December 13, 2021	Shavar Reynolds Jr., Monmouth	Jao Ituka (2), Marist
December 20, 2021	Jao Ituka, Marist	Jao Ituka (3), Marist
December 27, 2021	Scott Hitchon, Canisius	Walter Clayton Jr., Iona
January 3, 2022	Kevin Marfo, Quinnipiac	Walter Clayton Jr. (2), Iona
January 10, 2022	Dwight Murray Jr., Rider	Jared Billups, Siena
January 17, 2022	Jose Perez, Manhattan	Jao Ituka (4), Marist
January 24, 2022	Elijah Joiner, Iona	Jao Ituka (5), Marist
January 31, 2022	Kevin Marfo (2), Quinnipiac	Noah Harris, Marist
February 7, 2022	Marcus Hammond (2), Niagara	Xzavier Long, Canisius
February 14, 2022	Anthony Gaines, Siena	Jao Ituka (6), Marist
February 21, 2022	Nelly Junior Joseph (2), Iona	Jao Ituka (7), Marist
February 28, 2022	Tyson Jolly, Iona	TJ Long (3), Fairfield; Jao Ituka (8), Marist
March 7, 2022	Marcus Hammond (3), Niagara	Jao Ituka (9), Marist

=== Records against other conferences ===
Records against non-conference foes for the 2021–22 season. Records shown for regular season only.

Power 7 Conferences	Record
American	1–1
ACC	1–2
Big East	0–6
Big Ten	0–2
Big 12	0–1
Pac-12	0–1
SEC	1–2
Power 7 Total	3–15
Other NCAA Division I Conferences	Record
America East	4–2
A-10	2–6
ASUN	5–0
Big Sky	–––
Big South	1–0
Big West	–––
CAA	4–2
C-USA	0–3
Horizon League	1–3
Ivy League	7–4
MAC	1–2
MEAC	3–0
MVC	–––
Mountain West	–––
NEC	5–2
OVC	1–1
Patriot League	9–6
Pacific West	–––
SoCon	2–0
Southland	–––
SWAC	1–0
The Summit	0–1
Sun Belt	1–0
WAC	–––
WCC	–––
Other Division I Total	47–32
NCAA Division I Total	50–47

== Postseason ==
=== MAAC Tournament ===
- 2022 Metro Atlantic Athletic Conference Basketball Tournament, Jim Whelan Boardwalk Hall, Atlantic City, New Jersey

First round Tuesday, March 8
8	Manhattan	67
9	Rider	79
7	Fairfield	72
10	Canisius	50
6	Marist	52
11	Quinnipiac	77

Quarterfinals; Wednesday & Thursday, March 9 & 10
1	Iona	70
9	Rider	71
4	Monmouth	61
5	Niagara	58
2	Saint Peter's	77
7	Fairfield	63
3	Siena	71
11	Quinnipiac	77

Semifinals; Friday, March 11
9	Rider	68
4	Monmouth	72
2	Saint Peter's	64
11	Quinnipiac	52

Championship; Saturday, March 12
4	Monmouth	54
2	Saint Peter's	60

=== NCAA Tournament ===
Seed	Region	School	1st Round	2nd Round	Regional Semi	Regional final
15	East	Saint Peter's	W 85–79^{OT} vs (2) Kentucky	W 70–60 vs (7) Murray State	W 67–64 vs (3) Purdue	L 49–69 vs (8) North Carolina

==== Game summaries ====
First round

CBS

March 17, 2022
7:10 p.m.

Recap

(2 E) No. 7 Kentucky 79, (15 E) Saint Peter's 85 (OT)
Scoring by half: 34–34, 37–37 Overtime: 8–14
Pts: O. Tshiebwe – 30; Rebs: O. Tshiebwe – 16; Asts: Wheeler – 6 Wheeler – 11 pts, 4 reb	Pts: Banks III – 27; Rebs: H. Drame – 8 Asts: Lee & H. Drame – 4 Edert – 20 pts, 4 reb, 2 ast
NCAA tournament first round

Gainbridge Fieldhouse
Indianapolis, IN
Attendance: 17,923
Referees: Larry Spaulding, Joe Lindsay, Edwin Young

Second Round

CBS

March 19, 2022
8:20 p.m.

Recap

(7 E) No. 20 Murray State 60, (15 E) Saint Peter's 70
Scoring by half: 27–32, 33–38
Pts: Hill – 19; Rebs: Hannibal – 8 Asts: Hill & Brown – 4 Brown – 14 pts, 5 reb	Pts: Ndefo – 17; Rebs: Ndefo – 10; Asts: Lee – 4 Edert – 13 pts, 3 reb / Ndefo – 6 blk
NCAA tournament second round

Gainbridge Fieldhouse
Indianapolis, IN
Attendance: 17,838
Referees: Jeb Hartness, Roger Ayers, Ray Natili

East Regional semifinal

CBS

March 25, 2022
7:09 p.m.

Recap

(3 E) No. 10 Purdue 64, (15 E) Saint Peter's 67
Scoring by half: 33–29, 31–38
Pts: Williams – 16; Rebs: Williams & Ivey – 8 Asts: Gillis – 4 Edey – 11 pts, 2 reb	Pts: Banks III – 14; Rebs: 4 tied – 3 Asts: Ndefo – 4 Rupert – 11 pts, 3 reb, 3 stl, 2 blk
NCAA Tournament Sweet Sixteen

Wells Fargo Center
Philadelphia, PA
Attendance:
Referees: Pat Driscoll, Chris Rastatter, Brent Hampton

East Regional final

CBS

March 27, 2022
5:05 p.m.

Recap

(8 E) North Carolina 69, (15 E) Saint Peter's 49
Scoring by half: 38–19, 31–30
Pts: Bacot – 20; Rebs: Bacot – 22; Asts: Black – 5 Manek – 19 pts, 8 reb	Pts: F. Drame – 12; Rebs: F. Drame & Ndefo – 7 Asts: Ndefo – 3 Ndefo – 10 pts, 3 stl, 6 blk
NCAA Tournament Elite Eight

Wells Fargo Center
Philadelphia, PA
Attendance: 20,235
Referees: Verne Harris, Jon Higgins, Bo Boroski

==== NCAA Tournament Awards and honors ====
East Region All-Tournament Team

- Daryl Banks III, Saint Peter's
- Doug Edert, Saint Peter's

=== National Invitation Tournament ===
Seed	School	1st Round
	Iona	L 74–79 at (3) Florida – (Exactech Arena, Gainesville, Florida)

==== Game summary ====
ESPN2

March 16, 2022
9:00 p.m.

Recap

Iona 74, (3) Florida 79
Scoring by half: 42–35, 32–44
Pts: Junior Joseph – 18; Rebs: Junior Joseph – 12; Asts: Jolly & van Eyck – 4 Clayton Jr. – 8 pts, 2 reb, 4 stl	Pts: Castleton & Fleming – 18; Rebs: Castleton – 13; Asts: Appleby – 5 Reeves – 14 pts, 6 reb, 1 stl
NIT first round

Exactech Arena
Gainesville, Florida
Attendance: 3,023
Referees: Jamie Luckie, Jerry Heater, Todd Austin

== Honors and awards ==
=== MAAC Season Awards ===
2021–22 MAAC Men's Basketball Major Individual Awards
Award	Recipient(s)
Player of the Year	Tyson Jolly, Iona
Coach of the Year	Rick Pitino, Iona
Rookie of the Year	†Jao Ituka, Marist
Defensive Player of the Year	KC Ndefo, Saint Peter's
Sixth Player of the Year	Dylan van Eyck, Iona

2021–22 MAAC Men's Basketball All-Conference Teams
First Team	Second Team	Third Team	Rookie Team
†Tyson Jolly, Sr, G, Iona; Nelly Junior Joseph, So, F, Iona; Jose Perez, Sr, G, Manhattan; George Papas, Sr, G, Monmouth; Marcus Hammond, Sr, G Niagara	Elijah Joiner, Sr, G, Iona; Jao Ituka, Fr, G, Marist; Walker Miller, Sr, C, Monmouth; KC Ndefo, Sr, G, Saint Peter's; Colby Rogers, Jr, G, Siena	Ricardo Wright, So, G, Marist; Shavar Reynolds Jr., Sr, G, Monmouth; Matt Balanc, Jr, G, Quinnipiac; Kevin Marfo, Sr, F, Quinnipiac; Dimencio Vaughn, Sr, G, Rider; Daryl Banks III, Jr, G, Saint Peter's; Anthony Gaines, Sr, G, Siena	TJ Long, Fr, G, Fairfield; †Walter Clayton Jr., Fr, G, Iona; †Jao Ituka, Fr, G, Marist; Jaylen Murray, Fr, G, Saint Peter's; Jared Billups, Fr, G, Siena

† denotes unanimous selection

=== All-MAAC tournament team ===
2022 MAAC Men's Basketball All-Championship Team
- Jacob Rigoni, Quinnipiac – 15.6 ppg, 1 bpg
- Dwight Murray Jr., Rider – 17.3 ppg, 6 apg, 38.6 mpg
- Walker Miller, Monmouth – 14.6 ppg, 1.3 bpg, 33.6 mpg
- Shavar Reynolds, Monmouth – 14.6 ppg, 4 rpg, 32.6 mpg
- Doug Edert, Saint Peter's – 12.6 ppg, 4.3 rpg, 28.6 mpg
- Matthew Lee, Saint Peter's – 10.3 ppg, 2.1 rpg, 26.3 mpg
- ^{MVP} KC Ndefo, Saint Peter's – 13.3 ppg, 5.6 rpg, 1 spg, 3.3 bpg

== 2021–22 Season final statistic leaders ==
Scoring leaders
Rk	Player	PTS	PPG
1	Jose Perez, Manhattan	567	18.9
2	Marcus Hammond, Niagara	524	18.1
3	Jao Ituka, Marist	427	15.3
4	George Papas, Monmouth	507	14.9
5	Walker Miller, Monmouth	498	14.6
5	Matt Balanc, Quinnipiac	439	14.6
5	Tyson Jolly, Iona	467	14.6

Rebound leaders
Rk	Player	REB	RPG
1	Kevin Marfo, Quinnipiac	316	10.2
2	Supreme Cook, Fairfield	274	8.3
3	Nelly Junior Joseph, Iona	272	8.2
4	Dimencio Vaughn, Rider	246	7.5
5	Nikkei Rutty, Monmouth	238	7.4

Field goal leaders (avg 5 fga/gm)
Rk	Player	FG	FGA	PCT
1	Josh Roberts, Manhattan	115	165	.697
2	Jordan Jones, Marist	98	158	.620
3	Warren Williams, Manhattan	93	153	.608
4	Ajiri Ogemuno-Johnson, Rider	111	198	.561
5	Nelly Junior Joseph, Iona	160	292	.548

Assist leaders
Rk	Player	AST	APG
1	Dwight Murray Jr., Rider	150	4.7
2	Jose Perez, Manhattan	136	4.5
3	Kevin Marfo, Quinnipiac	120	3.9
4	Noah Thomasson, Niagara	103	3.4
5	Elijah Joiner, Iona	96	3.3

Block leaders
Rk	Player	BLK	BPG
1	KC Ndefo, Saint Peter's	96	2.8
2	Nelly Junior Joseph, Iona	62	1.9
3	Josh Roberts, Manhattan	40	1.3
4	Jackson Stormo, Siena	35	1.3
5	Jordan Jones, Marist	35	1.2

Free throw leaders
Rk	Player	FT	FTA	PCT
1	Doug Edert, Saint Peter's	86	97	.887
2	George Papas, Monmouth	108	125	.864
3	Shavar Reynolds, Monmouth	110	128	.859
4	Daryl Banks III, Saint Peter's	85	99	.859
5	Taj Benning, Fairfield	85	101	.842

Steal leaders
Rk	Player	STL	SPG
1	Dimencio Vaughn, Rider	63	1.9
2	Ant Nelson, Manhattan	42	1.6
3	Nick Hopkins, Siena	42	1.5
4	Jordan Cintron, Niagara	45	1.5
5	George Papas, Monmouth	47	1.4

Three point leaders
Rk	Player	3P	3PA	%
1	Colby Rogers, Siena	73	170	.429
2	Raheim Sullivan, Marist	23	54	.426
3	Doug Edert, Saint Peter's	46	112	.412
4	TJ Long, Fairfield	52	129	.403
5	Nick Hopkins, Siena	48	124	.387

=== Individual statistic NCAA Top 100 leaders ===
*Final 2021–22*

Scoring

- Jose Perez, Manhattan (18.9/game): 45th
- Marcus Hammond, Niagara (18.1/game): 66th

Total Points

- Jose Perez, Manhattan (567): 80th

Rebounding

- Kevin Marfo, Quinnipiac (10.2/game): 14th
- Supreme Cook, Fairfield (8.3/game): 56th
- Nelly Junior Joseph, Iona (8.2/game): 58th

Total Rebounds

- Kevin Marfo, Quinnipiac (316): 19th
- Supreme Cook, Fairfield (274): 48th
- Nelly Junior Joseph, Iona (272): 52nd

Defensive Rebounds

- Anthony Gaines, Siena (6.11/game): 46th

Offensive Rebounds

- Nelly Junior Joseph, Iona (3.27/game): 17th
- Kevin Marfo, Quinnipiac (3.10/game): 32nd
- Supreme Cook, Fairfield (2.88/game): 49th

Assists

- Dwight Murray Jr., Rider (4.7/game): 55th
- Jose Perez, Manhattan (4.3/game): 65th

Total Assists

- Dwight Murray Jr., Rider (150): 52nd
- Jose Perez, Manhattan (136): 87th

Assist Turnover Ratio

- Dylan van Eyck, Iona (2.08): 70th
- Elijah Joiner, Iona (1.98): 88th

Steals

- Dimencio Vaughn, Rider (1.9/game): 52nd

Total Steals

- Dimencio Vaughn, Rider (62): 43rd

Blocks

- KC Ndefo, Saint Peter's (2.82/game): 11th
- Nelly Junior Joseph, Iona (1.88/game): 50th

Total Blocks

- KC Ndefo, Saint Peter's (96): 7th
- Nelly Junior Joseph, Iona (62): 42nd

Minutes

- Dwight Murray Jr., Rider (37.2/game): 9th
- George Papas, Monmouth (35.1/game): 64th

Total Minutes Played

- Dwight Murray Jr., Rider (1196): 43rd
- George Papas, Monmouth (1194): 46th

Double Doubles

- Kevin Marfo, Quinnipiac (12): 26th
- Nelly Junior Joseph, Iona (11): 36th
- Supreme Cook, Fairfield (7): 95th

Field Goal Percentage (minimum avg 5 made per game)

- Jao Ituka, Marist (151–287 .5261): 59th

Total Field Goals Attempted

- Jose Perez, Manhattan (446): 67th

Free-throw percentage (minimum avg 2.5 made per game)

- Doug Edert, Saint Peter's (86–97 .8866): 18th
- George Papas, Monmouth (108–125 .8640): 45th
- Shavar Reynolds, Monmouth (110–128 .8593): 51st
- Daryl Banks III, Saint Peter's (85–99 .8586): 52nd
- Taj Benning, Fairfield (85–101 .8416): 73rd
- Marcus Hammond, Niagara (103–124 .8308): 94th

Free Throws Made

- Jose Perez, Manhattan (182): 4th

Free Throw Attempts

- Jose Perez, Manhattan (227): 4th
- Nelly Junior Joseph, Iona (166): 74th
- KC Ndefo, Saint Peter's (162): 83rd

Three-point percentage (minimum 1.5 made per game)

- Colby Rogers, Siena (73–170 .4294): 8th
- George Papas, Monmouth (103–292 .3532): 85th

Three-point field goals made per game

- George Papas, Monmouth (3.03/game): 20th
- Colby Rogers, Siena (2.61/game): 66th

Three-point field goals made

- George Papas, Monmouth (103): 15th

Three-point field goals attempted

- George Papas, Monmouth (292): 7th

=== Team statistic rankings ===
(Thru games of March 15, 2022)

	Canisius	Fairfield	Iona	Manhattan	Marist	Monmouth	Niagara	Quinnipiac	Rider	Saint Peter's	Siena
Scoring/game	68.5 (6)	67.8 (7)	75.2 (1)	70.9 (3)	68.8 (4)	68.6 (5)	67.4 (9)	71.8 (2)	67.8 (8)	66.9 (10)	66.3 (11)
Defense/game	71.5 (9)	66.0 (3)	68.3 (6)	72.6 (11)	68.2 (5)	67.3 (4)	65.5 (2)	71.5 (9)	69.3 (8)	61.8 (1)	69.2 (7)
FG%	.400 (11)	.434 (5)	.446 (1)	.440 (2)	.439 (3)	.418 (9)	.439 (4)	.431 (6)	.414 (10)	.431 (7)	.426 (8)
FG% defense	.460 (10)	.427 (7)	.414 (3)	.462 (11)	.415 (4)	.407 (2)	.416 (5)	.434 (8)	.416 (6)	.383 (1)	.441 (9)
Three Point %	.306 (11)	.340 (6)	.333 (7)	.307 (10)	.344 (5)	.331 (8)	.345 (3)	.345 (4)	.322 (9)	.353 (2)	.356 (1)
Free Throw %	.693 (10)	.704 (8)	.697 (9)	.735 (3)	.719 (7)	.728 (6)	.731 (5)	.765 (1)	.736 (2)	.683 (11)	.733 (4)
Scoring margin	-3.0 (11)	1.9 (3)	6.9 (1)	-1.8 (9)	0.6 (6)	1.3 (5)	1.9 (4)	0.3 (7)	-1.5 (8)	5.1 (2)	-2.9 (10)
Rebound margin	-1.0 (9)	0.2 (6)	1.8 (2)	-0.4 (8)	0.4 (7)	1.4 (3)	-1.8 (10)	0.9 (4)	0.7 (5)	3.1 (1)	-2.4 (11)

=== Team statistic NCAA Top 100 leaders ===
*Final 2021–22*

Scoring

- Iona (75.2/game): 65th

Defense

- Saint Peter's (61.8/game): 19th
- Niagara (65.5/game): 65th
- Fairfield (66.0/game): 81st

Rebounding

- Rider (37.06/game): 79th
- Iona (36.97/game): 83rd
- Monmouth (36.50/game): 100th

Total Rebounds

- Monmouth (1241): 62nd
- Rider (1223): 83rd
- Iona (1220): 85th
- Saint Peter's (1218): 89th

Offensive Rebounds

- Iona (11.42/game): 70th
- Canisius (11.12/game): 88th

Assists

- Iona (16.2/game): 17th
- Quinnipiac (14.4/game): 79th

Total Assists

- Iona (533): 24th

Assist-Turnover ratio

- Iona (1.28): 47th

Blocked Shots

- Iona (6.0/game): 3rd
- Saint Peter's (5.0/game): 21st
- Siena (4.0/game): 79th

Total Blocks

- Iona (199): 5th
- Saint Peter's (170): 17th

Field Goal Percentage Defense

- Saint Peter's (.3859): 9th
- Monmouth (.4074): 41st
- Marist (.4150): 80th
- Niagara (.4155): 84th
- Rider (.4156): 85th
- Iona (.4157): 87th

Three-Point Attempts

- Quinnipiac (801): 70th

Three-Point Percentage

- Siena (.3557): 72nd

Free-throw percentage

- Quinnipiac (.7654): 22nd

Scoring Margin

- Iona (6.6): 72nd

Rebound Margin

- Saint Peter's (3.1): 92nd
