= 2022 MAAC men's basketball tournament =

- Classification: Division I
- Season: 2021–22
- Teams: 11
- Site: Jim Whelan Boardwalk Hall; Atlantic City, New Jersey
- Champions: Saint Peter's (4th title)
- Winning coach: Shaheen Holloway (1st title)
- MVP: KC Ndefo (Saint Peter's)
- Top scorer: Dwight Murray, Jr. (Rider) (52 points)
- Television: ESPNews, ESPNU, ESPN+

2021–22 MAAC men's basketball standings
	Conf.				Overall
Team	W		L	PCT	W		L	PCT
Iona	17	–	3	.850	25	–	8	.758
Saint Peter's †	14	–	6	.700	22	–	12	.647
Siena	12	–	8	.600	15	–	14	.517
Monmouth	11	–	9	.550	21	–	13	.618
Niagara	9	–	11	.450	14	–	16	.467
Marist	9	–	11	.450	14	–	16	.467
Fairfield	8	–	12	.400	15	–	18	.455
Manhattan	8	–	12	.400	15	–	15	.500
Rider	8	–	12	.400	14	–	19	.424
Canisius	7	–	13	.350	11	–	21	.344
Quinnipiac	7	–	13	.350	14	–	17	.452
† 2022 MAAC tournament winner

The 2022 Metro Atlantic Athletic Conference men's basketball tournament was the postseason men's basketball tournament for the Metro Atlantic Athletic Conference for the 2021–22 NCAA Division I men's basketball season. The tournament was played March 8–12, 2022, at the Jim Whelan Boardwalk Hall in Atlantic City, New Jersey, for the third year in a row. The tournament winner, the Saint Peter's Peacocks, received the conference's automatic bid to the 2022 NCAA Division I men's basketball tournament.

== Seeds ==
All 11 teams in the conference participated in the Tournament. The top five teams received byes to the quarterfinals. Teams were seeded by record within the conference, with a tiebreaker system to seed teams with identical conference records.

Seed	School	Conference	Tiebreaker 1	Tiebreaker 2
1	Iona	17–3		
2	Saint Peter's	14–6		
3	Siena	12–8		
4	Monmouth	11–9		
5	Niagara	9–11	1–1 vs Marist	1–1 vs Iona
6	Marist	9–11	1–1 vs Niagara	0–2 vs Iona
7	Fairfield	8–12	Mini Conference 3–1	
8	Manhattan	8–12	Mini Conference 2–2	
9	Rider	8–12	Mini Conference 1–3	
10	Canisius	7–13	2–0 vs Quinnipiac	
11	Quinnipiac	7–13	0–2 vs Canisius	

== Schedule ==
Session	Game	Time*	Matchup	Score	Attendance	Television
First Round – Tuesday, March 8
1	1	5:00 pm	No. 8 Manhattan vs. No. 9 Rider	67–79		ESPN+
1	2	7:00 pm	No. 7 Fairfield vs. No. 10 Canisius	72–50		ESPN+
1	3	9:00 pm	No. 6 Marist vs. No. 11 Quinnipiac	52–77		ESPN+
Quarterfinals – Wednesday, March 9
2	4	7:00 pm	No. 1 Iona vs. No. 9 Rider	70–71		ESPN+
2	5	9:30 pm	No. 2 Saint Peter's vs. No. 7 Fairfield	77–63		ESPN+
Quarterfinals – Thursday, March 10
3	6	7:00 pm	No. 3 Siena vs. No. 11 Quinnipiac	71–77		ESPN+
3	7	9:30 pm	No. 4 Monmouth vs. No. 5 Niagara	61–58		ESPN+
Semifinals – Friday, March 11
4	8	6:00 pm	No. 4 Monmouth vs. No. 9 Rider	72–68		ESPNews/ESPN+
4	9	8:30 pm	No. 2 Saint Peter's vs. No. 11 Quinnipiac	64–52		ESPNews/ESPN+
Championship – Saturday, March 12
5	10	4:00 pm	No. 2 Saint Peter's vs No. 4 Monmouth	60–54		ESPNU
*Game times in ET. ()-Rankings denote tournament seeding.

== Bracket ==
First round Tuesday, March 8
8	Manhattan	67
9	Rider	79
7	Fairfield	72
10	Canisius	50
6	Marist	52
11	Quinnipiac	77

Quarterfinals; Wednesday & Thursday, March 9 & 10
1	Iona	70
9	Rider	71
4	Monmouth	61
5	Niagara	58
2	Saint Peter's	77
7	Fairfield	63
3	Siena	71
11	Quinnipiac	77

Semifinals; Friday, March 11
9	Rider	68
4	Monmouth	72
2	Saint Peter's	64
11	Quinnipiac	52

Championship; Saturday, March 12
4	Monmouth	54
2	Saint Peter's	60

== Game summaries ==
=== First round ===
ESPN+

March 8, 2022
5:00 pm

Recap

No. 8 Manhattan 67, No. 9 Rider 79
Scoring by half: 36–42, 31–37
Pts: Perez – 20; Rebs: Roberts – 7 Asts: 3 tied – 5 Perez – 4 stl	Pts: Vaughn – 20; Rebs: Ogemuno-Johnson – 12; Asts: Murray, Jr. – 6 James – 16 pts, 8 reb, 4 ast / Vaughn – 7 reb, 4 stl

Jim Whelan Boardwalk Hall
Atlantic City, NJ
Referees: Rob Riley, Adam Vandenburgh, Tim Smith

ESPN+

March 8, 2022
7:00 pm

Recap

No. 7 Fairfield 72, No. 10 Canisius 50
Scoring by half: 31–20, 41–30
Pts: Cruz – 19; Rebs: Cook – 9 Asts: C. Green – 6 Benning – 15pts, 4 reb	Pts: Ahemed – 9 Rebs: X. Long – 10; Asts: Henderson – 3 Harried – 6 pts, 6 reb, 3 blk

Jim Whelan Boardwalk Hall
Atlantic City, NJ
Referees: Tony Crisp, Andy O'Brien, Mike McClosky

ESPN+

March 8, 2022
9:00 pm

Recap

No. 6 Marist 52, No. 11 Quinnipiac 77
Scoring by half: 25–31, 27–46
Pts: Wright – 14; Rebs: J. Jones – 6 Asts: Wright – 2 Jones – 12 pts, 1 blk	Pts: Rigoni – 26; Rebs: D. Jones – 10; Asts: D. Jones – 8 D. Jones – 17 pts, 2 stl, 1 blk

Jim Whelan Boardwalk Hall
Atlantic City, NJ
Referees: Ed Corliss, Ryan Zinc, Carl Luciano

=== Quarterfinals ===
ESPN+

March 9, 2022
7:00 pm

Recap

No. 1 Iona 70, No. 9 Rider 71
Scoring by half: 30–28, 40–43
Pts: Jolly – 19; Rebs: Junior Joseph – 6 Asts: Clayton, Jr. – 6 Junior Joseph – 11 pts, 5 blk	Pts: Murray, Jr. – 21; Rebs: Ogemuno-Johnson – 12; Asts: Murray Jr. – 8 James – 13 pts, 6 reb, 2 ast

Jim Whelan Boardwalk Hall
Atlantic City, NJ
Referees: Mike Fleury, Ed Corliss, Mike Palau

ESPN+

March 9, 2022
9:30 pm

Recap

No. 2 Saint Peter's 77, No. 7 Fairfield 63
Scoring by half: 44–19, 33–44
Pts: Ndefo – 20; Rebs: Rupert – 6 Asts: Banks III & Edert – 2 Banks III – 14 pts, 4 reb	Pts: Benning – 19; Rebs: Cook – 9 Asts: Benning – 3 Cook – 13 pts

Jim Whelan Boardwalk Hall
Atlantic City, NJ
Referees: Tim Smith, Andy O'Brien, Nathan Hall

ESPN+

March 10, 2022
7:00 pm

Recap

No. 3 Siena 71, No. 11 Quinnipiac 77
Scoring by half: 32–40, 39–37
Pts: McCollum – 16; Rebs: Billups – 9 Asts: McCollum – 4 Rogers – 14 pts, 5 reb	Pts: Rigoni – 16; Rebs: Marfo – 11; Asts: Kortright – 7 D. Jones – 11 pts, 5 reb, 4 ast

Jim Whelan Boardwalk Hall
Atlantic City, NJ
Referees: Ed Corliss, Mike Nampone, Ryan Zink

ESPN+

March 10, 2022
9:30 pm

Recap

No. 4 Monmouth 61, No. 5 Niagara 58
Scoring by half: 35–35, 26–23
Pts: Miller – 17; Rebs: Rutty – 9 Asts: Papas & Reynolds – 5 Reynolds – 15 pts, 5 reb	Pts: Hammond – 17; Rebs: Cintron & Iorio – 8 Asts: Hammond – 5 Thomasson – 13 pts, 4 reb, 2 stl

Jim Whelan Boardwalk Hall
Atlantic City, NJ
Referees: Evon Burroughs, Mike McCloskey, Nathan Hall

=== Semifinals ===
ESPNews & ESPN+

March 11, 2022
6:00 pm

Recap

No. 4 Monmouth 72, No. 9 Rider 68
Scoring by half: 29–30, 43–38
Pts: Papas – 20; Rebs: McClary & Papas – 6 Asts: 3 tied – 3 Reynolds – 17 pts, 3 ast	Pts: Murray Jr. – 20; Rebs: Ogemuno-Johnson – 8 Asts: Murray & Johnson – 4 Powell – 19 pts

Jim Whelan Boardwalk Hall
Atlantic City, NJ
Referees: Greg Evans, Ed Corliss, Tim Smith

ESPNews & ESPN+

March 11, 2022
8:30 pm

Recap

No. 2 Saint Peter's 64, No. 11 Quinnipiac 52
Scoring by half: 30–31, 34–21
Pts: Lee – 14; Rebs: Ndefo & Edert – 7 Asts: 3 tied – 2 Ndefo – 13 pts, 3 blk, 1 stl	Pts: Balanc – 14; Rebs: Marfo – 11; Asts: Marfo – 4 D. Jones – 10 pts, 4 reb, 2 ast, 2 stl

Jim Whelan Boardwalk Hall
Atlantic City, NJ
Referees: Evon Burroughs, Mike Palau, Andy O'Brien

=== Championship ===
ESPNU

March 12, 2022
4:00 pm

Recap

No. 2 Saint Peter's 60, No. 4 Monmouth 54
Scoring by half: 29–25, 31–29
Pts: Edert – 20; Rebs: F. Drame – 10; Asts: 4 tied – 2 Ndefo – 7 pts, 7 reb, 4 blk	Pts: Miller – 15; Rebs: Miller & Rutty – 6 Asts: Papas – 3 Vaughan – 10 pts, 4 reb, 1 blk, 3 stl

Jim Whelan Boardwalk Hall
Atlantic City, NJ
Referees: Matt Potter, Tony Chiazza, Tom Morrisey

== Team and tournament leaders ==
=== Team leaders ===
Team	Points		Rebounds		Assists		Steals		Blocks		Minutes		W – L
(10) Canisius	Ahemed	9	X. Long	10	Henderson	3	4 tied	1	Harried	3	Henderson	38	0–1
(7) Fairfield	Benning	34	Cook	18	Green	7	Crisler	4	Cook & Cruz	2	Benning	78	1–1
(1) Iona	Jolly	19	Jr. Joseph	6	Clayton Jr.	6	van Eyck & Jolly	2	Jr. Joseph	5	Joiner	36	0–1
(8) Manhattan	Perez	21	Roberts	7	3 tied	5	Perez	4	Roberts	3	Perez	40	0–1
(6) Marist	Wright	14	J. Jones	6	Wright	2	Herasme	2	J. Jones	1	Herasme	34	0–1
(4) Monmouth	Miller & Reynolds	44	Rutty	19	Papas	11	Papas	5	Miller	4	Papas	109	2–1
(5) Niagara	Hammond	17	Cintron & Iorio	8	Hammond	5	Thomasson	2	Cintron & Iorio	1	Hammond	40	0–1
(11) Quinnipiac	Rigoni & Balanc	47	Marfo	31	D. Jones	14	D. Jones & Marfo	4	Rigoni	3	D. Jones	103	2–1
(9) Rider	Murray Jr.	52	Ogemuno-Johnson	32	Murray Jr.	18	Vaughn	6	James	4	Murray Jr.	116	2–1
(2) Saint Peter's	Ndefo	40	Ndefo/H Drame/F Drame	17	Banks III	6	Banks III	6	Ndefo	10	Edert	86	3–0
(3) Siena	McCollum	16	Billups	9	McCollum	4	Billups	3	Stormo	2	Rogers	38	0–1

== All-championship team ==
2022 MAAC Men's Basketball All-Championship Team
- Jacob Rigoni, Quinnipiac – 15.6 ppg, 1 bpg
- Dwight Murray Jr., Rider – 17.3 ppg, 6 apg, 38.6 mpg
- Walker Miller, Monmouth – 14.6 ppg, 1.3 bpg, 33.6 mpg
- Shavar Reynolds, Monmouth – 14.6 ppg, 4 rpg, 32.6 mpg
- Doug Edert, Saint Peter's – 12.6 ppg, 4.3 rpg, 28.6 mpg
- Matthew Lee, Saint Peter's – 10.3 ppg, 2.1 rpg, 26.3 mpg
- ^{MVP} KC Ndefo, Saint Peter's – 13.3 ppg, 5.6 rpg, 1 spg, 3.3 bpg

== See also ==
- 2022 MAAC women's basketball tournament
