= 2021–22 Siena Saints men's basketball team =

American college basketball season

2021–22 Siena Saints men's basketball
- Conference: Metro Atlantic Athletic Conference
- Record: 15–14 (12–8 MAAC)
- Head coach: Carmen Maciariello (3rd season)
- Assistant coaches: Bobby Castagna; Greg Fahey; Marcus King
- Home arena: MVP Arena

2021–22 MAAC men's basketball standings
	Conf.				Overall
Team	W		L	PCT	W		L	PCT
Iona	17	–	3	.850	25	–	8	.758
Saint Peter's †	14	–	6	.700	22	–	12	.647
Siena	12	–	8	.600	15	–	14	.517
Monmouth	11	–	9	.550	21	–	13	.618
Niagara	9	–	11	.450	14	–	16	.467
Marist	9	–	11	.450	14	–	16	.467
Fairfield	8	–	12	.400	15	–	18	.455
Manhattan	8	–	12	.400	15	–	15	.500
Rider	8	–	12	.400	14	–	19	.424
Canisius	7	–	13	.350	11	–	21	.344
Quinnipiac	7	–	13	.350	14	–	17	.452
† 2022 MAAC tournament winner

The 2021–22 Siena Saints men's basketball team represented Siena College in the 2021–22 NCAA Division I men's basketball season. The Saints, led by third-year head coach Carmen Maciariello, played their home games at MVP Arena in Albany, New York as members of the Metro Atlantic Athletic Conference.

== Previous season ==
The Saints finished the 2020–21 season 12–5, 12–4 in MAAC play to finish as MAAC regular season co-champions alongside Monmouth. As the #1 seed in the MAAC tournament, they were upset by #9 seed Iona in the quarterfinals.

== Roster ==
2021–22 Siena Saints men's basketball team
Players
Coaches

Pos.	#	Name	Height	Weight	Year	Hometown
G	0	Nick Hopkins	6 ft 0 in (1.83 m)	171 lb (78 kg)	GS	Fayetteville, TN
G	1	Jared Billups	6 ft 4 in (1.93 m)	189 lb (86 kg)	Fr	Waldorf, MD
G	2	Javian McCollum	6 ft 2 in (1.88 m)	153 lb (69 kg)	Fr	Fort Myers, FL
G	3	Colby Rogers	6 ft 4 in (1.93 m)	184 lb (83 kg)	Jr	Covington, GA
G	5	Jayce Johnson	6 ft 5 in (1.96 m)	208 lb (94 kg)	Sr	Buffalo, NY
G	11	Anthony Gaines	6 ft 5 in (1.96 m)	203 lb (92 kg)	GS	Kingston, NY
G	13	Aidan Dagostino	6 ft 1 in (1.85 m)	147 lb (67 kg)	Fr	Saratoga Springs, NY
F	14	Jordan Kellier	6 ft 6 in (1.98 m)	226 lb (103 kg)	Jr	Portmore, Jamaica
G	15	Robert Mahala	6 ft 5 in (1.96 m)	171 lb (78 kg)	Sr	Jackson, NJ
F	21	Michael Tertsea	6 ft 10 in (2.08 m)	237 lb (108 kg)	RS Sr	Benue State, Nigeria
G	22	Andrew Platek	6 ft 4 in (1.93 m)	213 lb (97 kg)	RS Sr	Guilderland, NY
G	23	Taihland Owens	6 ft 6 in (1.98 m)	186 lb (84 kg)	Fr	Canton, GA
F	24	Michael Baer	6 ft 7 in (2.01 m)	212 lb (96 kg)	GS	Bettendorf, IA
G	25	Aidan Carpenter	6 ft 4 in (1.93 m)	195 lb (88 kg)	So	Hamden, CT
F	33	Steven Lazar	6 ft 6 in (1.98 m)	174 lb (79 kg)	So	Toronto, ON
F	55	Jackson Stormo	6 ft 9 in (2.06 m)	247 lb (112 kg)	Sr	Santa Barbara, CA

Head coach

- Carmen Maciariello (Siena)

Assistant coach(es)

- Bobby Castagna (Cal State Northridge)
- Greg Fahey (Marist)
- Marcus King (Northeastern State)

Legend

- (C) Team captain
- (S) Suspended
- (I) Ineligible
- (W) Walk-on
- Injured
- Current redshirt

Roster
Last update: December 3, 2021

== Schedule and results ==
Date time, TV	Rank^{#}	Opponent^{#}	Result	Record	Site (attendance) city, state
Exhibition
October 25, 2021*; 7:00 pm		Saint Rose	W 77–70	–	MVP Arena (4,770); Albany, NY
Regular season
November 9, 2021*; 7:00 pm, ESPN+		at No. 23 St. Bonaventure; Br. Ed Coughlin Franciscan Cup	L 47–75	0–1	Reilly Center (4,617); St. Bonaventure, NY
November 13, 2021*; 7:00 pm, ESPN3		Delaware	L 63–83	0–2	MVP Arena (5,842); Albany, NY
November 16, 2021*; 7:00 pm, ESPN3		Yale	L 54–82	0–3	MVP Arena (4,729); Albany, NY
November 19, 2021*; 6:30 pm, FS2		at Georgetown	L 65–83	0–4	Capital One Arena (4,460); Washington, D.C.
November 22, 2021*; 7:00 pm, ESPN3		Harvard	W 72–69	1–4	MVP Arena (4,673); Albany, NY
November 28, 2021*; 2:00 pm, ESPN+		at Bucknell	L 56–65 ^{OT}	1–5	Sojka Pavilion (1,146); Lewisburg, PA
November 30, 2021*; 7:00 pm, ESPN+		at Army	W 83–67	2–5	Christl Arena (551); West Point, NY
December 3, 2021; 7:00 pm, ESPN3		Manhattan	L 72–77 ^{OT}	2–6 (0–1)	MVP Arena (4,988); Albany, NY
December 5, 2021; 2:00 pm, ESPN3		at Saint Peter's	W 60–58	3–6 (1–1)	Run Baby Run Arena (483); Jersey City, NJ
December 11, 2021*; 2:00 pm, NBCSB/ESPN+		at Holy Cross	W 72–59	4–6	Hart Center; Worcester, MA
December 28, 2021*; 2:00 pm, ESPN+		at American	Canceled due to COVID-19 issues at American		Bender Arena; Washington, D.C.
January 9, 2022; 2:00 pm, My 4 Albany/ESPN3		Fairfield	W 69–62	5–6 (2–1)	MVP Arena (4,918); Albany, NY
January 14, 2022; 7:00 pm, ESPN3		at Marist	W 67–60	6–6 (3–1)	McCann Arena (927); Poughkeepsie, NY
January 21, 2022; 7:00 pm, ESPN+		at Manhattan	L 68–75	6–7 (3–2)	Draddy Gymnasium (150); Riverdale, NY
January 25, 2022; 7:00 pm, ESPN3		at Iona; Rescheduled from December 31	L 57–74	6–8 (3–3)	Hynes Athletic Center (2,087); New Rochelle, NY
January 28, 2022; 7:00 pm, My 4 Albany/ESPN+		Niagara	W 60–56	7–8 (4–3)	MVP Arena (5,401); Albany, NY
January 30, 2022; 2:00 pm, My 4 Albany/ESPN+		Quinnipiac	W 85–76	8–8 (5–3)	MVP Arena (5,527); Albany, NY
February 1, 2022; 7:00 pm, My 4 Albany/ESPN+		Canisius; Rescheduled from January 2	W 73–65	9–8 (6–3)	MVP Arena (4,788); Albany, NY
February 4, 2022; 7:00 pm, My 4 Albany/ESPN+		Rider	L 60–74	9–9 (6–4)	MVP Arena (5,710); Albany, NY
February 6, 2022; 2:00 pm, ESPN+		at Fairfield	W 62–56	10–9 (7–4)	Webster Bank Arena (2,149); Bridgeport, CT
February 11, 2022; 9:00 pm, ESPNU		Iona	W 70–64	11–9 (8–4)	MVP Arena (6,383); Albany, NY
February 13, 2022; 1:00 pm, ESPN3		at Rider	W 76–75 ^{OT}	12–9 (9–4)	Alumni Gymnasium (1,650); Lawrenceville, NJ
February 18, 2022; 7:00 pm, My 4 Albany/ESPN+		Marist	L 53–62	12–10 (9–5)	MVP Arena (6,214); Albany, NY
February 20, 2022; 2:00 pm, My 4 Albany/ESPN+		Saint Peter's	W 84–70	13–10 (10–5)	MVP Arena (6,044); Albany, NY
February 22, 2022; 7:00 pm, ESPN3		at Monmouth; Rescheduled from January 7	L 59–71	13–11 (10–6)	OceanFirst Bank Center (1,646); West Long Branch, NJ
February 24, 2022; 7:00 pm, ESPN3		at Quinnipiac	W 78–71	14–11 (11–6)	People's United Center (991); Hamden, CT
February 27, 2022; 2:00 pm, My 4 Albany/ESPN+		Monmouth	W 70–59	15–11 (12–6)	MVP Arena (6,524); Albany, NY
March 3, 2022; 7:00 pm, ESPN3		at Niagara	L 52–74	15–12 (12–7)	Gallagher Center (1,062); Lewiston, NY
March 5, 2022; 4:00 pm, ESPN3		at Canisius	L 64–67	15–13 (12–8)	Koessler Athletic Center (1,119); Buffalo, NY
MAAC tournament
March 10, 2022; 7:00 p.m., ESPN+	(3)	vs. (11) Quinnipiac; Quarterfinals	L 71–77	15–14	Boardwalk Hall; Atlantic City, NJ
*Non-conference game. ^{#}Rankings from AP Poll. (#) Tournament seedings in parentheses. All times are in Eastern.
