= KC Ndefo =

American basketball player (born 2000)

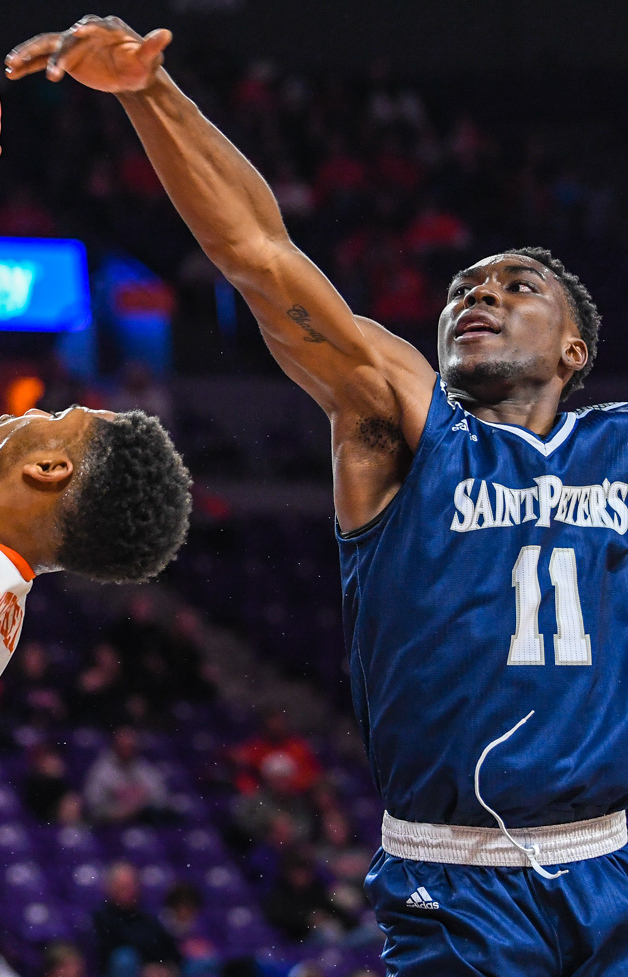
- Ndefo with Saint Peter's in 2018

No. 4 – Panerythraikos
- Position: Power forward
- League: Greek Elite League

Personal information
- Born: March 1, 2000 (age 26) Elmont, New York, U.S
- Listed height: 6 ft 7 in (2.01 m)
- Listed weight: 195 lb (88 kg)

Career information
- High school: Elmont Memorial (Elmont, New York); Abraham Lincoln (Brooklyn, New York)
- College: Saint Peter's (2018–2022); Seton Hall (2022–2023)
- NBA draft: 2023: undrafted
- Playing career: 2024–present

Career history
- 2024: Texas Legends
- 2024: Memphis Hustle
- 2024: South Bay Lakers
- 2025–present: Panerythraikos

Career highlights
- Lefty Driesell Award (2022); NCAA blocks leader (2021); 3× MAAC Defensive Player of the Year (2020–2022); First-team All-MAAC (2021); Second-team All-MAAC (2022); Third-team All-MAAC (2020); MAAC tournament MVP (2022)

Kenechukwu "KC" Ndefo (born March 1, 2000) is an American basketball player for Panerythraikos of the Greek Elite League. He played college basketball for the Saint Peter's Peacocks and the Seton Hall Pirates.

== High school career ==
Ndefo began his high school career at Elmont Memorial High School. He helped lead team to a Class A state title as a sophomore. Ndefo helped Elmont Memorial win the Nassau Championship as a junior. He finished with 22 points, 14 rebounds and five blocks in the title game and hit the game-winning buzzer-beating shot in the 58–56 win against South Side High School. After his junior season, Ndefo transferred to Abraham Lincoln High School. He averaged 14 points and 9 rebounds per game as a senior. In January 2018, the New York Board of Education ruled Ndefo ineligible, causing him to miss the remainder of the season. He committed to playing college basketball for Saint Peter's, the only Division I school to offer him a scholarship.

== College career ==
As a freshman, Ndefo averaged 7.8 points and 5 rebounds per game. Ndefo averaged 8.5 points, 5.3 rebounds, 2.4 blocks and 1.4 steals per game as a sophomore. He was named MAAC Defensive Player of the Year, MAAC Sixth Man of the Year, and Third Team All-MAAC. Ndefo posted a career-high seven blocks against Siena on January 23, 2021. On February 26, 2021, he scored a career-high 22 points in a 66–52 win against Rider. As a junior, Ndefo averaged 13.7 points, 6.5 rebounds, 1.5 assists and 1.4 steals per game while shooting 50 percent from the floor. His 3.6 blocks per game led Division I in that category, and he was the shortest player to lead the nation in blocked shots per game since William Mosley of Northwestern State in 2011. He was named to the First Team All-MAAC as well as repeating as MAAC Defensive Player of the Year. Following the season, Ndefo entered the transfer portal, but ultimately returned to Saint Peter's. On February 4, 2022, he scored 14 points and had a program-high 11 blocks in an 83–74 victory over Quinnipiac. Ndefo also surpassed the 1,000-point mark during the game. He was named to the Third Team All-MAAC as well as MAAC Defensive Player of the Year for the third consecutive season, becoming only the third player in MAAC history to win the award three times. Ndefo helped lead the Peacocks to a MAAC tournament title and a surprising run to the Elite 8 in the subsequent NCAA tournament as a 15-seed. Following the season, Ndefo declared for the 2022 NBA draft and entered the NCAA transfer portal.

On May 28, 2022, Ndefo transferred to Seton Hall, following his head coach Shaheen Holloway, who left Saint Peter's after the 2021–22 season to fill the head coaching vacancy at his alma mater.

== Professional career ==
After going undrafted in the 2023 NBA draft, Ndefo joined the Ontario Clippers of the NBA G League on October 30, 2023, following a tryout. However, he was waived on November 7. On January 9, 2024, he joined the Texas Legends, but was waived on January 26. Four days later, he joined the Memphis Hustle. However, he was waived on February 9 and re-signed three days later. On February 27, he was waived by Memphis. On February 29, he joined the South Bay Lakers and on December 3, he was waived.

On January 4, 2025, Ndefo signed with Panerythraikos of the Greek Elite League.

== Career statistics ==
Legend
GP	Games played	GS	Games started	MPG	Minutes per game
FG%	Field goal percentage	3P%	3-point field goal percentage	FT%	Free throw percentage
RPG	Rebounds per game	APG	Assists per game	SPG	Steals per game
BPG	Blocks per game	PPG	Points per game	**Bold**	Career high

*	Led NCAA Division I

=== College ===
Year	Team	GP	GS	MPG	FG%	3P%	FT%	RPG	APG	SPG	BPG	PPG
2018–19	Saint Peter's	31	19	27.3	.437	.222	**.657**	5.0	.9	.9	1.8	7.8
2019–20	Saint Peter's	28	2	22.0	.462	.000	.636	5.3	1.1	**1.4**	2.4	8.5
2020–21	Saint Peter's	25	24	**28.8**	.504	.118	.597	**6.5**	1.5	**1.4**	**3.6***	**13.7**
2021–22	Saint Peter's	**34**	**34**	25.9	.470	**.286**	.537	6.1	**2.4**	1.3	2.8	10.5
2022–23	Seton Hall	33	32	26.1	**.525**	.200	**.657**	5.2	1.5	1.0	1.9	8.4
Career		151	110	26.0	.480	.202	.608	5.6	1.5	1.2	2.5	9.7
