= 2021–22 Niagara Purple Eagles men's basketball team =

American college basketball season

2021–22 Niagara Purple Eagles men's basketball
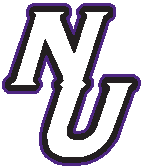
- Conference: Metro Atlantic Athletic Conference
- Record: 14–16 (9–11 MAAC)
- Head coach: Greg Paulus (3rd season)
- Assistant coaches: Bryan Smothers; Brett Ervin; Kevin Devitt
- Home arena: Gallagher Center

2021–22 MAAC men's basketball standings
	Conf.				Overall
Team	W		L	PCT	W		L	PCT
Iona	17	–	3	.850	25	–	8	.758
Saint Peter's †	14	–	6	.700	22	–	12	.647
Siena	12	–	8	.600	15	–	14	.517
Monmouth	11	–	9	.550	21	–	13	.618
Niagara	9	–	11	.450	14	–	16	.467
Marist	9	–	11	.450	14	–	16	.467
Fairfield	8	–	12	.400	15	–	18	.455
Manhattan	8	–	12	.400	15	–	15	.500
Rider	8	–	12	.400	14	–	19	.424
Canisius	7	–	13	.350	11	–	21	.344
Quinnipiac	7	–	13	.350	14	–	17	.452
† 2022 MAAC tournament winner

The 2021–22 Niagara Purple Eagles men's basketball team represented Niagara University in the 2021–22 NCAA Division I men's basketball season. The Purple Eagles, led by third-year head coach Greg Paulus, played their home games at the Gallagher Center in Lewiston, New York as members of the Metro Atlantic Athletic Conference (MAAC).

The Purple Eagles finished the season 14–16, 9–11 in MAAC play, to finish tied for fifth place. As the No. 5 seed, they were defeated by No. 4 seed Monmouth in the quarterfinals of the MAAC tournament.

== Previous season ==
The Purple Eagles finished the 2020–21 season 9–11, 7–9 in MAAC play, to finish in a tie for fifth place. As the No. 5 seed in the MAAC tournament, they defeated No. 4 seed Marist in the quarterfinals before being upset by No. 9 seed Iona, in the semifinals.

== Roster ==
2021–22 Niagara Purple Eagles men's basketball team
Players
Coaches

Pos.	#	Name	Height	Weight	Year	Hometown
G	0	Justin Roberts	5 ft 10 in (1.78 m)	189 lb (86 kg)	GS	Toledo	Lawrence, KS
G	2	Rob III Brown	6 ft 4 in (1.93 m)	185 lb (84 kg)	Fr	Kimball Union Academy	Albany, NY
G	4	Tahjae Hill	6 ft 2 in (1.88 m)	180 lb (82 kg)	Fr	Hilton High School	Hilton, NY
F	5	Jordan Cintron	6 ft 8 in (2.03 m)	220 lb (100 kg)	GS	Longwood	The Bronx, NY
G	10	Marcus Hammond	6 ft 3 in (1.91 m)	173 lb (78 kg)	Sr	Cardozo High School	Queens, NY
G	11	Raheem Solomon	6 ft 3 in (1.91 m)	180 lb (82 kg)	Sr	Sacred Heart High School	Hartford, CT
G	12	Shandon Brown	5 ft 9 in (1.75 m)	175 lb (79 kg)	Sr	George Washington	Boston, MA
F	13	Touba Traore	6 ft 11 in (2.11 m)	210 lb (95 kg)	So	Massanutten Military Academy	Bamako, Mali
F	15	Greg Kuakumensah	6 ft 6 in (1.98 m)	200 lb (91 kg)	GS	Cushing Academy	Worcester, MA
G	21	Noah Thomasson	6 ft 3 in (1.91 m)	195 lb (88 kg)	Jr	Butler Community College	Houston, TX
F	22	Sam Iorio	6 ft 7 in (2.01 m)	230 lb (104 kg)	GS	South Alabama	Allentown, PA
G	24	Julian Mackey	6 ft 3 in (1.91 m)	165 lb (75 kg)	Fr	Skills Factory (TSF)	Grayson, GA
G	33	Steven Levnaic	6 ft 2 in (1.88 m)	180 lb (82 kg)	RS Jr	RISE Centre Academy	Hamilton, ON
F	34	Nicholas Kratholm	6 ft 9 in (2.06 m)	220 lb (100 kg)	GS	Miami Dade College	Louisville, KY

Head coach

- Greg Paulus (Duke)

Assistant coach(es)

- Bryan Smothers (Wayne State)
- Brett Ervin (West Virginia Wesleyan)
- Kevin Devitt (DePaul)

Legend

- (C) Team captain
- (S) Suspended
- (I) Ineligible
- (W) Walk-on
- Injured
- Current redshirt

Roster
Last update: October 27, 2021

== Schedule and results ==
Date time, TV	Rank^{#}	Opponent^{#}	Result	Record	Site (attendance) city, state
Exhibition
November 1, 2021*; 7:00 p.m., ESPN3		Cazenovia College	W 95–55	–	Gallagher Center (208); Lewiston, NY
Regular season
November 9, 2021*; 7:30 p.m., FS1		at Xavier	L 60–63	0–1	Cintas Center (10,003); Cincinnati, OH
November 12, 2021*; 7:00 p.m., BTN+		at No. 17 Ohio State	L 74–84	0–2	Value City Arena (9,749); Columbus, OH
November 19, 2021*; 7:45 p.m., ESPN+		vs. SIU Edwardsville; The YSU/J. Arnold Wealth Management Company Basketball Tournament	W 70–60	1–2	Covelli Centre (1,625); Youngstown, OH
November 20, 2021*; 4:45 p.m., ESPN+		vs. St. Thomas; The YSU/J. Arnold Wealth Management Company Basketball Tournament	L 67–76	1–3	Covelli Centre (1,390); Youngstown, OH
November 21, 2021*; 3:45 p.m., ESPN+		at Youngstown State; The YSU/J. Arnold Wealth Management Company Basketball Tournament	W 58–53	2–3	Beeghly Center (1,731); Youngstown, OH
November 29, 2021*; 7:00 p.m., ESPN+		at Colgate	W 70–59	3–3	Cotterell Court (483); Hamilton, NY
December 3, 2021; 7:00 p.m., ESPN+		Monmouth	L 49–57	3–4 (0–1)	Gallagher Center (627); Lewiston, NY
December 5, 2021; 1:00 p.m., ESPN3		Fairfield	L 71–81	3–5 (0–2)	Gallagher Center (607); Lewiston, NY
December 8, 2021*; 7:00 p.m., ESPN3		at Eastern Michigan	L 58–60	3–6	George Gervin GameAbove Center (1,111); Ypsilanti, MI
December 12, 2021*; 1:00 p.m., ESPN3		Buffalo State	W 112–52	4–6	Gallagher Center (629); Lewiston, NY
December 18, 2021*; 2:00 p.m.		vs. Albany	W 66–58	5–6	KeyBank Center; Buffalo, NY
December 21, 2021*; 7:00 p.m., ESPN3		at Binghamton	Canceled due to COVID-19 issues		Binghamton University Events Center; Vestal, NY
December 31, 2021; 2:00 p.m., ESPN+		at Quinnipiac	L 68–77	5–7 (0–3)	People's United Center (523); Hamden, CT
January 9, 2022; 1:00 p.m., ESPN3		Quinnipiac	W 76–66	6–7 (1–3)	Gallagher Center (572); Lewiston, NY
January 13, 2022; 7:00 p.m., ESPN3		Canisius; Battle of the Bridge	W 68–58	7–7 (2–3)	Gallagher Center (1,156); Lewiston, NY
January 16, 2022; 1:00 p.m., ESPN3		at Iona	L 55–78	7–8 (2–4)	Hynes Athletic Center (1,623); New Rochelle, NY
January 18, 2022; 7:00 p.m., ESPN3		at Manhattan; Rescheduled from January 2	W 72–63	8–8 (3–4)	Draddy Gymnasium (70); Riverdale, NY
January 21, 2022; 7:00 p.m., ESPN3		Saint Peter's	L 68–74 ^{OT}	8–9 (3–5)	Gallagher Center (1,080); Lewiston, NY
January 23, 2022; 1:00 p.m., ESPN3		Rider	L 67–70	8–10 (3–6)	Gallagher Center (973); Lewiston, NY
January 28, 2022; 7:00 p.m., ESPN+		at Siena	L 56–60	8–11 (3–7)	MVP Arena (5,401); Albany, NY
January 30, 2022; 2:00 p.m., ESPN3		at Monmouth	W 70–69 ^{OT}	9–11 (4–7)	OceanFirst Bank Center (1,223); West Long Branch, NJ
February 4, 2022; 7:00 p.m., ESPN3		Manhattan	W 80–74 ^{OT}	10–11 (5–7)	Gallagher Center (923); Lewiston, NY
February 6, 2022; 1:00 p.m., ESPN+		Iona	W 80–71	11–11 (6–7)	Gallagher Center (1,112); Lewiston, NY
February 12, 2022; 1:00 p.m., ESPN+		at Fairfield	L 53–73	11–12 (6–8)	Webster Bank Arena (1,476); Bridgeport, CT
February 14, 2022; 7:00 p.m., ESPN3		at Marist	L 70–77	11–13 (6–9)	McCann Arena (797); Poughkeepsie, NY
February 19, 2022; 1:00 p.m., ESPN3		at Canisius; Battle of the Bridge	W 65–54	12–13 (7–9)	Koessler Athletic Center (1,207); Buffalo, NY
February 25, 2022; 7:00 p.m., ESPN+		at Rider	L 68–70	12–14 (7–10)	Alumni Gymnasium (1,650); Lawrenceville, NJ
February 27, 2022; 2:00 p.m., ESPN+		at Saint Peter's	L 36–63	12–15 (7–11)	Run Baby Run Arena (581); Jersey City, NJ
March 3, 2022; 7:00 p.m., ESPN3		Siena	W 74–52	13–15 (8–11)	Gallagher Center (1,062); Lewiston, NY
March 5, 2022; 1:00 p.m., ESPN+		Marist	W 83–52	14–15 (9–11)	Gallagher Center (1,057); Lewiston, NY
MAAC tournament
March 10, 2022; 9:30 p.m., ESPN+	(5)	vs. (4) Monmouth; Quarterfinals	L 58–61	14–16	Boardwalk Hall; Atlantic City, NJ
*Non-conference game. ^{#}Rankings from AP poll. (#) Tournament seedings in parentheses. All times are in Eastern.
