= 2021–22 Manhattan Jaspers basketball team =

American college basketball season

2021–22 Manhattan Jaspers basketball
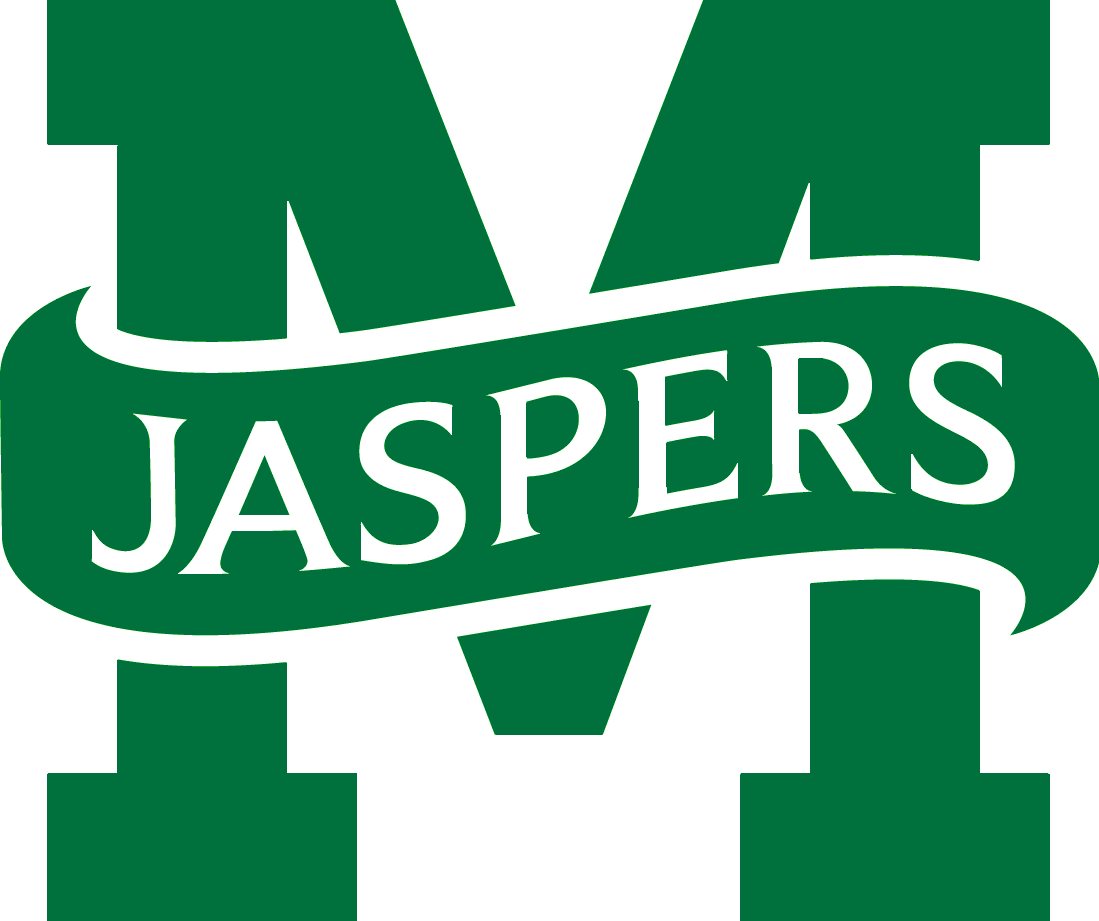
- Conference: Metro Atlantic Athletic Conference
- Record: 15–15 (8–12 MAAC)
- Head coach: Steve Masiello (11th season)
- Associate head coach: RaShawn Stores
- Assistant coaches: Tyler Wilson; Anthony Doran; Scott Padgett
- Home arena: Draddy Gymnasium

2021–22 MAAC men's basketball standings
	Conf.				Overall
Team	W		L	PCT	W		L	PCT
Iona	17	–	3	.850	25	–	8	.758
Saint Peter's †	14	–	6	.700	22	–	12	.647
Siena	12	–	8	.600	15	–	14	.517
Monmouth	11	–	9	.550	21	–	13	.618
Niagara	9	–	11	.450	14	–	16	.467
Marist	9	–	11	.450	14	–	16	.467
Fairfield	8	–	12	.400	15	–	18	.455
Manhattan	8	–	12	.400	15	–	15	.500
Rider	8	–	12	.400	14	–	19	.424
Canisius	7	–	13	.350	11	–	21	.344
Quinnipiac	7	–	13	.350	14	–	17	.452
† 2022 MAAC tournament winner

The 2021–22 Manhattan Jaspers basketball team represented Manhattan University (then called Manhattan College) in the 2021–22 NCAA Division I men's basketball season. The Jaspers, led by 11th-year head coach Steve Masiello, played their home games at Draddy Gymnasium in Riverdale, New York as members of the Metro Atlantic Athletic Conference (MAAC).

The Jaspers finished the season 15–15, 8–12 in MAAC play, to finish tied for seventh place. As the 8 seed, they were defeated by 9 seed Rider in the first round of the MAAC tournament.

On October 25, 2022, just two weeks prior to the start of the season, Manhattan announced that head coach Steve Masiello would be leaving the program after 11 years at the helm. Assistant head coach RaShawn Stores, who had spent the last six years as an assistant, was named interim head coach for the upcoming season.

== Previous season ==
The Jaspers finished the 2020–21 season 7–13, 6–12 in MAAC play, to finish in a tie for ninth place. As the No. 10 seed in the MAAC tournament, they lost in the first round to No. 7 seed Fairfield.

== Roster ==
2021–22 Manhattan Jaspers men's basketball team
Players
Coaches

Pos.	#	Name	Height	Weight	Year	Hometown
F	0	Warren Williams	6 ft 9 in (2.06 m)	240 lb (109 kg)	Sr	Kingston, Jamaica
G	1	Matthew Glassman	6 ft 0 in (1.83 m)	175 lb (79 kg)	Sr	Bedford, NH
G	2	Romar Reid	6 ft 2 in (1.88 m)	175 lb (79 kg)	Jr	Mount Vernon, NY
G	3	Ant Nelson	6 ft 4 in (1.93 m)	180 lb (82 kg)	Sr	New York, NY
G	4	Samir Stewart	6 ft 0 in (1.83 m)	180 lb (82 kg)	Sr	Fort Lauderdale, FL
F	5	Samba Diallo	6 ft 7 in (2.01 m)	195 lb (88 kg)	Sr	Rufisque, Senegal
F	10	Adam Cisse	6 ft 10 in (2.08 m)	220 lb (100 kg)	Jr	The Bronx, NY
F	11	Daniel Schreier	6 ft 9 in (2.06 m)	220 lb (100 kg)	Jr	Santa Monica, CA
G	12	Aryan Arora	6 ft 1 in (1.85 m)	175 lb (79 kg)	Fr	Tuxedo Park, NY
F	15	Jose Perez	6 ft 5 in (1.96 m)	220 lb (100 kg)	Sr	The Bronx, NY
G	21	Daniel Hackett	6 ft 1 in (1.85 m)	175 lb (79 kg)	Fr	Commack, NY
F	23	Josh Roberts	6 ft 9 in (2.06 m)	220 lb (100 kg)	Sr	Troy, AL
G	24	Marques Watson	6 ft 5 in (1.96 m)	190 lb (86 kg)	Sr	Brooklyn, NY
G	30	Elijah Buchanan	6 ft 5 in (1.96 m)	190 lb (86 kg)	Sr	The Bronx, NY
G	55	Nick Brennen	6 ft 5 in (1.96 m)	180 lb (82 kg)	Sr	Irvington, NY

Head coach

- Steve Masiello (Kentucky)

Assistant coach(es)

- Matt Grady (Saint Joseph's)
- RaShawn Stores (Manhattan)
- Tyler Wilson (Manhattan)
- Anthony Doran
- Scott Padgett (Kentucky)

Legend

- (C) Team captain
- (S) Suspended
- (I) Ineligible
- (W) Walk-on
- Injured
- Current redshirt

Roster
Last update: January 28, 2022

== Schedule and results ==
Date time, TV	Rank^{#}	Opponent^{#}	Result	Record	Site (attendance) city, state
Regular season
November 9, 2021*; 3:00 p.m., ESPN3		Manhattanville	W 99–42	1–0	Draddy Gymnasium (217); Riverdale, NY
November 12, 2021*; 7:00 p.m., ESPN3		Fordham; Battle of the Bronx	W 66–60	2–0	Draddy Gymnasium (1,675); Riverdale, NY
November 15, 2021*; 7:00 p.m., ESPN+		at Old Dominion	L 58–79	2–1	Chartway Arena (4,412); Norfolk, VA
November 19, 2021*; 7:30 p.m., ESPN3		vs. North Alabama; MAAC/ASUN Challenge	W 55–51	3–1	HP Field House (287); Bay Lake, FL
November 20, 2021*; 6:00 p.m., ESPN3		vs. Liberty; MAAC/ASUN Challenge	W 76–60	4–1	HP Field House (432); Bay Lake, FL
November 30, 2021*; 7:00 p.m., ESPN3		Fairleigh Dickinson	W 78–73	5–1	Draddy Gymnasium (1,264); Riverdale, NY
December 3, 2021; 7:00 p.m., ESPN3		at Siena	W 77–72 ^{OT}	6–1 (1–0)	Times Union Center (4,988); Albany, NY
December 5, 2021; 2:00 p.m., ESPN+		Quinnipiac	L 73–90	6–2 (1–1)	Draddy Gymnasium (1,203); Riverdale, NY
December 11, 2021*; 3:00 p.m., P12N		at Utah	L 62–96	6–3	Jon M. Huntsman Center (6,645); Salt Lake City, UT
December 20, 2021*; 7:00 p.m., ESPN+		vs. Charleston Southern; The Citadel Classic	W 99–75	7–3	McAlister Field House (912); Charleston, SC
December 21, 2021*; 7:00 p.m., ESPN+		at The Citadel; The Citadel Classic	W 77–74	8–3	McAlister Field House (799); Charleston, SC
January 14, 2022; 7:00 p.m., ESPNU		at Iona	L 76–88	8–4 (1–2)	Hynes Athletic Center (2,594); New Rochelle, NY
January 16, 2022; 2:00 p.m., ESPN+		Canisius	W 80–75	9–4 (2–2)	Draddy Gymnasium (376); Riverdale, NY
January 18, 2022; 7:00 p.m., ESPN+		Niagara; Rescheduled from January 2	L 63–72	9–5 (2–3)	Draddy Gymnasium (70); Riverdale, NY
January 21, 2022; 7:00 p.m., ESPN+		Siena	W 75–68	10–5 (3–3)	Draddy Gymnasium (150); Riverdale, NY
January 23, 2022; 2:00 p.m., ESPN3		at Monmouth	L 62–78	10–6 (3–4)	OceanFirst Bank Center; West Long Branch, NJ
January 28, 2022; 7:00 p.m., ESPN3		at Saint Peter's	L 51–77	10–7 (3–5)	Run Baby Run Arena (510); Jersey City, NJ
January 30, 2022; 2:00 p.m., ESPN+		Marist	W 72–66	11–7 (4–5)	Draddy Gymnasium (100); Riverdale, NY
February 4, 2022; 7:00 p.m., ESPN3		at Niagara	L 74–80 ^{OT}	11–8 (4–6)	Gallagher Center (923); Lewiston, NY
February 6, 2022; 1:00 p.m., ESPN3		at Canisius	L 70–77	11–9 (4–7)	Koessler Athletic Center (1,042); Buffalo, NY
February 8, 2022; 7:00 p.m., ESPN3		at Rider; Rescheduled from January 7	L 67–76	11–10 (4–8)	Alumni Gymnasium (1,289); Lawrenceville, NJ
February 11, 2022; 7:00 p.m., ESPN3		Monmouth	L 65–75	11–11 (4–9)	Draddy Gymnasium (734); Riverdale, NY
February 13, 2022; 2:00 p.m., ESPN3		at Quinnipiac	W 83–66	12–11 (5–9)	People's United Center (875); Hamden, CT
February 16, 2022; 2:00 p.m., ESPN+		at Fairfield; Rescheduled from December 31	W 74–67	13–11 (6–9)	Webster Bank Arena (984); Bridgeport, CT
February 20, 2022; 2:00 p.m., ESPN+		Rider	W 84–78 ^{OT}	14–11 (7–9)	Draddy Gymnasium (717); Riverdale, NY
February 25, 2022; 7:00 p.m., ESPNU		at Marist	L 56–74	14–12 (7–10)	McCann Arena (2,665); Poughkeepsie, NY
February 27, 2022; 2:00 p.m., ESPN3		Fairfield	L 62–66	14–13 (7–11)	Draddy Gymnasium (478); Riverdale, NY
March 1, 2022; 2:00 p.m., ESPN+		Saint Peter's; Rescheduled from January 9	L 51–73	14–14 (7–12)	Draddy Gymnasium (200); Riverdale, NY
March 3, 2022; 7:00 p.m., ESPN+		Iona	W 74–72	15–14 (8–12)	Draddy Gymnasium (1,910); Riverdale, NY
MAAC tournament
March 8, 2022; 5:00 p.m., ESPN+	(8)	vs. (9) Rider; First round	L 67–79	15–15	Boardwalk Hall; Atlantic City, NJ
*Non-conference game. ^{#}Rankings from AP poll. (#) Tournament seedings in parentheses. All times are in Eastern.
