= 2021–22 Marist Red Foxes men's basketball team =

American college basketball season

2021–22 Marist Red Foxes men's basketball
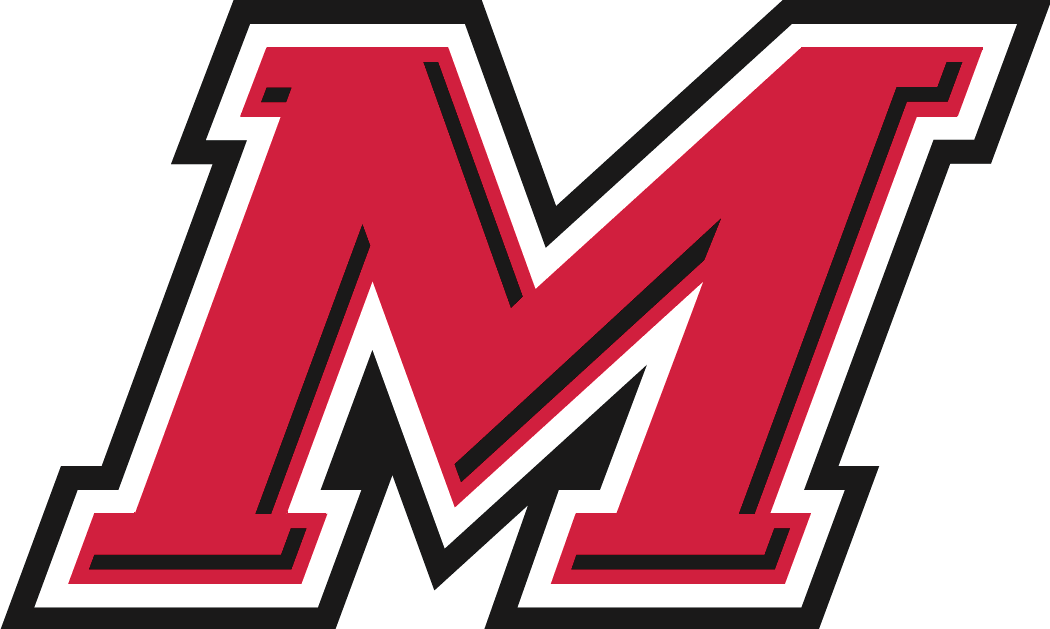
- Conference: Metro Atlantic Athletic Conference
- Record: 14–16 (9–11 MAAC)
- Head coach: John Dunne (4th season)
- Assistant coaches: Dorian Long; Kevin Driscoll; Dalip Bhatia
- Home arena: McCann Arena

2021–22 MAAC men's basketball standings
	Conf.				Overall
Team	W		L	PCT	W		L	PCT
Iona	17	–	3	.850	25	–	8	.758
Saint Peter's †	14	–	6	.700	22	–	12	.647
Siena	12	–	8	.600	15	–	14	.517
Monmouth	11	–	9	.550	21	–	13	.618
Niagara	9	–	11	.450	14	–	16	.467
Marist	9	–	11	.450	14	–	16	.467
Fairfield	8	–	12	.400	15	–	18	.455
Manhattan	8	–	12	.400	15	–	15	.500
Rider	8	–	12	.400	14	–	19	.424
Canisius	7	–	13	.350	11	–	21	.344
Quinnipiac	7	–	13	.350	14	–	17	.452
† 2022 MAAC tournament winner

The 2021–22 Marist Red Foxes men's basketball team represented Marist College in the 2021–22 NCAA Division I men's basketball season. The Red Foxes, led by fourth-year head coach John Dunne, played their home games at the McCann Arena in Poughkeepsie, New York as members of the Metro Atlantic Athletic Conference.

They finished the season 14–16 overall, and 9–11 in MAAC play to finish in a tie for fifth place. As the No. 6 seed in the MAAC tournament, they were upset in the first round by No. 11 seed Quinnipiac 52–77.

== Previous season ==
The Red Foxes finished the 2020–21 season 12–9 overall, 10–8 in MAAC play to finish in a tie for third place. As the No. 4 seed in the 2021 MAAC tournament, they were defeated by No. 5 seed Niagara in the quarterfinals 62–67. This marked the first overall and conference winning season for the Red Foxes since 2007–08 when they finished 18–14 overall, and 11–7 in the MAAC, and a tie for fifth place.

== Offseason ==
=== Departures ===
Departures
Name	Number	Pos.	Height	Weight	Year	Hometown	Reason for departure
Hakim Byrd	1	G	5'10"	155	Freshman	Philadelphia, PA	Transferred to UMBC
Michael Cubbage	5	G	6'4"	180	RS Senior	Sicklerville, NJ	Transferred to St. Francis Brooklyn
Henry Makeny	10	F	6'7"	185	Sophomore	Sydney, Australia	Left team for personal reasons
Tucker Lee	25	G	6'3"	180	Senior	Kent, CT	Graduated
Zion Tordoff	33	F	6'8"	220	Senior	Bradford, England	Transferred to Houston Baptist

=== Incoming transfers ===
Incoming transfers
Name	Number	Pos.	Height	Weight	Year	Hometown	Previous school
Samkelo Cele	25	F	6'5"	210	Senior	Durban, South Africa	Southern

== Roster ==
2021–22 Marist Red Foxes men's basketball team
Players
Coaches

Pos.	#	Name	Height	Weight	Year	Hometown
G	0	Raheim Sullivan	6 ft 1 in (1.85 m)	175 lb (79 kg)	Sr	Toronto, Canada
C	1	Rollin Belton	6 ft 8 in (2.03 m)	220 lb (100 kg)	Fr	Jonesboro, Louisiana
G	2	Ricardo Wright	6 ft 4 in (1.93 m)	185 lb (84 kg)	So	Eustis, Florida
G	10	Jao Ituka	6 ft 1 in (1.85 m)	196 lb (89 kg)	Fr	Gaithersburg, Maryland
C	11	Victor Enoh	6 ft 7 in (2.01 m)	250 lb (113 kg)	RS Sr	Decatur, Georgia
G	13	Matt Herasme	6 ft 3 in (1.91 m)	180 lb (82 kg)	Sr	Chester, New York
C	15	Jordan Jones	6 ft 8 in (2.03 m)	205 lb (93 kg)	RS Sr	Baltimore, Maryland
G	20	Terrence Echols	6 ft 2 in (1.88 m)	185 lb (84 kg)	Sr	Fayetteville, New York
G	21	Tyler Saint-Furcy	6 ft 4 in (1.93 m)	180 lb (82 kg)	Jr	Inwood, New York
G	22	Noah Harris	6 ft 1 in (1.85 m)	175 lb (79 kg)	Fr	Manalapan, New Jersey
F	23	Javon Cooley	6 ft 5 in (1.96 m)	185 lb (84 kg)	So	Chicago, Illinois
F	24	Braden Bell	6 ft 7 in (2.01 m)	190 lb (86 kg)	Sr	Rowlett, Texas
F	25	Samkelo Cele	6 ft 5 in (1.96 m)	210 lb (95 kg)	Sr	Durban, South Africa
F	50	Thomas Botticelli	6 ft 4 in (1.93 m)	185 lb (84 kg)	Fr	Commack, New York

Head coach

- John Dunne (Ithaca)

Assistant coach(es)

- Dorian Long (Neumann)
- Kevin Driscoll (Misericordia)
- Dalip Bhatia (Rutgers)

Legend

- (C) Team captain
- (S) Suspended
- (I) Ineligible
- (W) Walk-on
- Injured
- Current redshirt

Roster
Last update: November 16, 2021

== Schedule and results ==
Date time, TV	Rank^{#}	Opponent^{#}	Result	Record	High points	High rebounds	High assists	Site (attendance) city, state
Regular season
November 9, 2021*; 8:00 p.m., ESPN3		at American	L 73–77 ^{OT}	0–1	23 – Sullivan	6 – Tied	2 – Sullivan	Bender Arena (1,370); Washington, D.C.
November 12, 2021*; 7:00 p.m., ESPN3		at Columbia	W 82–67	1–1	17 – Sullivan	8 – Herasme	3 – Saint-Furcy	Levien Gymnasium (890); New York, NY
November 17, 2021*; 7:00 p.m., ESPN3		at Princeton	L 61–80	1–2	13 – Ituka	7 – Enoh	1 – Tied	Jadwin Gymnasium (953); Princeton, NJ
November 20, 2021*; 5:00 p.m., ESPN3		VMI	W 78–74 ^{OT}	2–2	29 – Wright	11 – Jones	1 – Tied	McCann Arena (1,183); Poughkeepsie, NY
November 27, 2021*; 1:00 p.m., ESPN+		at Army	L 61–65	2–3	12 – Ituka	6 – Jones	3 – Ituka	Christl Arena (665); West Point, NY
December 1, 2021; 7:00 p.m., ESPN+		Iona	L 71–78	2–4 (0–1)	19 – Ituka	5 – Cele	2 – Ituka	McCann Arena (1,232); Poughkeepsie, NY
December 5, 2021; 2:00 p.m., ESPN+		at Rider	W 79–67	3–4 (1–1)	27 – Wright	7 – Wright	3 – Sullivan	Alumni Gymnasium (1,201); Lawrenceville, NJ
December 8, 2021*; 7:00 p.m., ESPN+		at Binghamton	W 64–51	4–4	18 – Cele	9 – Enoh	2 – Harris	BU Events Center (1,328); Vestal, NY
December 12, 2021*; 2:00 p.m., ESPN3		Navy	L 61–67	4–5	18 – Wright	7 – Wright	2 – Cele	McCann Arena (1,350); Poughkeepsie, NY
December 18, 2021*; 5:00 p.m., ESPN+		at Boston University	W 84–79 ^{OT}	5–5	34 – Ituka	9 – Herasme	2 – Tied	Case Gym (483); Boston, MA
December 22, 2021*; 7:00 p.m., ESPN3		Bethune–Cookman	W 68–45	6–5	18 – Cele	9 – Enoh	4 – Sullivan	McCann Arena (793); Poughkeepsie, NY
January 2, 2022; 2:00 p.m., ESPN+		at Iona	L 66–69	6–6 (1–2)	13 – Ituka	6 – Tied	4 – Sullivan	Hynes Athletic Center (1,269); New Rochelle, NY
January 7, 2022; 7:00 p.m., ESPN+		at Fairfield	W 60–51	7–6 (2–2)	17 – Wright	10 – Wright	2 – Tied	Webster Bank Arena; Bridgeport, CT
January 9, 2022; 2:00 p.m., ESPN3		Rider	L 75–79	7–7 (2–3)	14 – Wright	6 – Wright	2 – Tied	McCann Arena (806); Poughkeepsie, NY
January 14, 2022; 7:00 p.m., ESPN3		Siena	L 60–67	7–8 (2–4)	20 – Ituka	7 – Herasme	3 – Harris	McCann Arena (927); Poughkeepsie, NY
January 16, 2022; 2:00 p.m., ESPN3		Monmouth	W 84–48	8–8 (3–4)	28 – Ituka	7 – Ituka	2 – Harris	McCann Arena (784); Poughkeepsie, NY
January 23, 2022; 2:00 p.m., ESPN3		Fairfield	L 66–69	8–9 (3–5)	19 – Wright	5 – Tied	2 – Ituka	McCann Arena (1,024); Poughkeepsie, NY
January 26, 2022; 7:00 p.m., ESPN3		Saint Peter's; Rescheduled from January 2	L 62–69	8–10 (3–6)	15 – Ituka	8 – Enoh	3 – Wright	McCann Arena (986); Poughkeepsie, NY
January 28, 2022; 7:30 p.m., ESPN+		at Quinnipiac	L 87–94	8–11 (3–7)	24 – Harris	7 – Tied	3 – Tied	People's United Center (1,025); Hamden, CT
January 30, 2022; 2:00 p.m., ESPN+		at Manhattan	L 66–72	8–12 (3–8)	21 – Ituka	7 – Tied	4 – Wright	Draddy Gymnasium (100); Riverdale, NY
February 6, 2022; 2:00 p.m., ESPN+		at Saint Peter's	L 50–66	8–13 (3–9)	11 – Bell	5 – Tied	3 – Wright	Run Baby Run Arena (632); Jersey City, NJ
February 8, 2022; 7:00 p.m., ESPN+		at Monmouth; Rescheduled from December 31	W 83–58	9–13 (4–9)	25 – Ituka	6 – Herasme	4 – Harris	OceanFirst Bank Center (1,516); West Long Branch, NJ
February 12, 2022; 7:00 p.m., ESPN+		Canisius	W 71–70	10–13 (5–9)	22 – Ituka	6 – Ituka	3 – Tied	McCann Arena (1,020); Poughkeepsie, NY
February 14, 2022; 7:00 p.m., ESPN3		Niagara	W 77–70	11–13 (6–9)	20 – Ituka	7 – Jones	4 – Ituka	McCann Arena (797); Poughkeepsie, NY
February 18, 2022; 7:00 p.m., ESPN+		at Siena	W 62–53	12–13 (7–9)	23 – Ituka	10 – Enoh	3 – Herasme	MVP Arena (6,214); Albany, NY
February 20, 2022; 2:00 p.m., ESPN3		Quinnipiac	W 67–66	13–13 (8–9)	12 – Sullivan	6 – Bell	6 – Ituka	McCann Arena (1,207); Poughkeepsie, NY
February 25, 2022; 7:00 p.m., ESPNU		Manhattan	W 74–56	14–13 (9–9)	15 – Tied	6 – Tied	2 – Tied	McCann Arena (2,665); Poughkeepsie, NY
March 3, 2022; 7:00 p.m., ESPN3		at Canisius	L 67–78	14–14 (9–10)	19 – Ituka	8 – Enoh	4 – Wright	Koessler Athletic Center (914); Buffalo, NY
March 5, 2022; 1:00 p.m., ESPN+		at Niagara	L 52–83	14–15 (9–11)	19 – Ituka	7 – Wright	1 – Tied	Gallagher Center (1,057); Lewiston, NY
MAAC tournament
March 8, 2022; 9:00 p.m., ESPN+	(6)	vs. (11) Quinnipiac; First Round	L 52–77	14–16	14 – Wright	6 – Jones	2 – Wright	Boardwalk Hall; Atlantic City, NJ
*Non-conference game. ^{#}Rankings from AP Poll. (#) Tournament seedings in parentheses. All times are in Eastern; Source.

== Awards ==
Following the season, two Marist players were selected to the All-MAAC teams, freshman guard Jao Ituka and sophomore guard Ricardo Wright. Ituka was the unanimous selection for the 2022 Metro Atlantic Athletic Conference Men's Basketball Rookie of the Year, as well as being selected to the All-MAAC Second Team. Ituka led the team in scoring at 15.3 points per game, third in the MAAC, and shot 52.6% from the field, which was 59th best in all NCAA for the season. Wright was selected on the All-MAAC Third Team after being selected to the All-Rookie Team last season. Wright was 10th in the MAAC in scoring average at 13.6 points per game, and sixth in three-point percentage at .383.

== Statistics ==
=== Players ===
Legend
GP	Games played	GS	Games started	MPG	Minutes per game
FG%	Field-goal percentage	3P%	3-point field-goal percentage	FT%	Free-throw percentage
RPG	Rebounds per game	APG	Assists per game	SPG	Steals per game
BPG	Blocks per game	PPG	Points per game	Source:

PLAYER	GP	GS	MPG	FG%	3P%	FT%	RPG	AST	STL	BLK	PPG
Braden Bell	29	3	15.6	.364	.269	.800	3.1	25	13	10	4.1
Rollin Belton	15	0	4.9	.308	-	.000	0.6	2	1	3	0.5
Thomas Butticelli	3	0	1.0	-	-	1.000	-	0	0	0	0.7
Samkelo Cele	30	27	21.7	.454	.322	.767	3.5	17	19	4	8.7
Javon Cooley	25	1	10.0	.340	.269	.400	1.8	10	9	5	1.7
Terrence Echols	4	1	2.3	.000	.000	1.000	0.3	0	1	0	0.5
Victor Enoh	28	14	18.4	.500	-	.563	4.5	9	9	17	2.7
Noah Harris	30	4	20.6	.351	.350	.857	2.0	31	20	1	6.1
Matt Herasme	28	28	29.7	.347	.310	.800	4.9	27	17	10	4.2
Jao Ituka	28	16	22.0	.526	.410	.768	3.1	45	19	7	15.3
Jordan Jones	30	16	19.7	.620	-	.708	3.9	16	14	35	7.7
Tyler Saint-Furcy	12	1	11.2	.263	.000	.429	1.9	4	8	2	1.1
Raheim Sullivan	23	12	19.9	.416	.426	.690	2.2	31	26	2	7.7
Ricardo Wright	30	27	29.0	.408	.374	.709	4.2	52	19	5	13.6
TOTALS	30		–	.439	.344	.719	35.1	1054	269	101	68.8
OPPONENTS	30		–	.415	.334	.728	35.1	1054	396	96	68.2

==== MAAC Leaders ====
Scoring

- Jao Ituka (15.3/game): 3rd
- Ricardo Wright (13.6/game): 10th

Rebounding

- Matt Herasme (4.9/game): 21st

Field Goal Percentage (minimum avg 5 attempted per game)

- Jordan Jones (98–158 .620): 2nd
- Samkelo Cele (104–229 .454): 16th

Free-throw percentage (minimum avg 3 attempted per game)

- Jao Ituka (109–142 .768): 11th

Steals per game

- Raheim Sullivan (1.1/game): 10th

3-Point Field Goal Percentage (minimum avg 2 attempted per game)

- Raheim Sullivan (23–54 .426): 2nd
- Ricardo Wright (58–155 .374): 6th
- Noah Harris (48–137 .350): 16th

3-Point Field Goals Made

- Ricardo Wright (58): 9th
- Noah Harris (48): 14th

Blocked Shots

- Jordan Jones (35): 5th
- Victor Enoh (17): 21st

Minutes Played

- Matt Herasme (29.7/game): 22nd
- Ricardo Wright (29.0/game): 23rd

To qualify, players must have appeared in 75% of team's games.
