= 2021–22 Fairfield Stags men's basketball team =

American college basketball season

2021–22 Fairfield Stags men's basketball
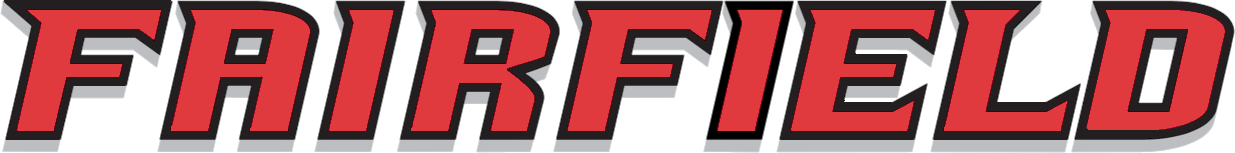
- Conference: Metro Atlantic Athletic Conference
- Record: 15–18 (8–12 MAAC)
- Head coach: Jay Young (3rd season)
- Assistant coaches: Chris Casey; James Johns; Bryan Dougher
- Home arena: Webster Bank Arena

2021–22 MAAC men's basketball standings
	Conf.				Overall
Team	W		L	PCT	W		L	PCT
Iona	17	–	3	.850	25	–	8	.758
Saint Peter's †	14	–	6	.700	22	–	12	.647
Siena	12	–	8	.600	15	–	14	.517
Monmouth	11	–	9	.550	21	–	13	.618
Niagara	9	–	11	.450	14	–	16	.467
Marist	9	–	11	.450	14	–	16	.467
Fairfield	8	–	12	.400	15	–	18	.455
Manhattan	8	–	12	.400	15	–	15	.500
Rider	8	–	12	.400	14	–	19	.424
Canisius	7	–	13	.350	11	–	21	.344
Quinnipiac	7	–	13	.350	14	–	17	.452
† 2022 MAAC tournament winner

The 2021–22 Fairfield Stags men's basketball team represented Fairfield University in the 2021–22 NCAA Division I men's basketball season. The Stags, led by third-year head coach Jay Young, played their home games at Webster Bank Arena in Bridgeport, Connecticut as members of the Metro Atlantic Athletic Conference.

== Previous season ==
The Stags finished the 2020–21 season 10–17, 7–11 in MAAC play to finish in a tie for sixth place. As the No. 7 seed in the MAAC tournament, they defeated No. 10 seed Manhattan in the first round, upset No. 2 seed Monmouth in the quarterfinals, upset No. 3 seed Saint Peter's in the semifinals to reach the championship game. There, they lost to No. 9 seed Iona.

== Roster ==
2021–22 Fairfield Stags men's basketball team
Players
Coaches

Pos.	#	Name	Height	Weight	Year	Hometown
G	0	Caleb Green	5 ft 10 in (1.78 m)	175 lb (79 kg)	GS	Londonderry, NH
F	1	Chris Maidoh	6 ft 10 in (2.08 m)	210 lb (95 kg)	Jr	New Carrollton, MD
G	2	Taj Benning	6 ft 4 in (1.93 m)	210 lb (95 kg)	GS	Fair Lawn, NJ
G	3	Jalen Leach	6 ft 3 in (1.91 m)	200 lb (91 kg)	So	Nyack, NY
G	4	Jake Wojcik	6 ft 5 in (1.96 m)	190 lb (86 kg)	Sr	San Jose, CA
F	5	Supreme Cook	6 ft 9 in (2.06 m)	215 lb (98 kg)	So	East Orange, NJ
F	10	Allan Jeanne-Rose	6 ft 7 in (2.01 m)	200 lb (91 kg)	Jr	Saint-Joseph, Martinique
F	11	Makai Willis	6 ft 9 in (2.06 m)	240 lb (109 kg)	Fr	Tallahassee, FL
G	12	Jack Mullally	5 ft 10 in (1.78 m)	170 lb (77 kg)	Jr	Belle Harbor, NY
G	13	Christian Cevis	6 ft 1 in (1.85 m)	185 lb (84 kg)	Fr	Long Valley, NJ
F	14	Jason Edokpayi	6 ft 6 in (1.98 m)	220 lb (100 kg)	So	Laurel, MD
F	15	Jack Brown	6 ft 6 in (1.98 m)	200 lb (91 kg)	So	Greenville, DE
F	20	Zach Crisler	6 ft 9 in (2.06 m)	215 lb (98 kg)	Jr	North Wales, PA
G	21	Mark Henry	5 ft 11 in (1.8 m)	170 lb (77 kg)	Jr	Hamburg, NY
G	24	Jesus Cruz	6 ft 5 in (1.96 m)	210 lb (95 kg)	GS	Carolina, PR
G	33	TJ Long	6 ft 4 in (1.93 m)	195 lb (88 kg)	Fr	Rockville Centre, NY
F	35	Tshiefu Ngalakulondi	6 ft 7 in (2.01 m)	215 lb (98 kg)	RS Sr	Manchester, NH

Head coach

- Jay Young (Marist)

Assistant coach(es)

- Chris Casey (Western Connecticut State)
- James Johns
- Bryan Dougher (Stony Brook)

Legend

- (C) Team captain
- (S) Suspended
- (I) Ineligible
- (W) Walk-on
- Injured
- Current redshirt

Roster
Last update: December 22, 2021

== Schedule and results ==
Date time, TV	Rank^{#}	Opponent^{#}	Result	Record	Site (attendance) city, state
Regular season
November 9, 2021*; 7:00 pm, FS1		at Providence	L 73–80	0–1	Dunkin' Donuts Center (9,990); Providence, RI
November 14, 2021*; 4:00 pm, ACCNX		at Boston College	L 64–72	0–2	Conte Forum (3,903); Chestnut Hill, MA
November 16, 2021*; 7:00 pm, ESPN3		Medgar Evers	W 110–55	1–2	Webster Bank Arena (1,389); Bridgeport, CT
November 20, 2021*; 8:00 pm, SNY		at Sacred Heart	W 71–61	2–2	William H. Pitt Center (3,873); Fairfield, CT
November 24, 2021*; 2:00 pm, ESPN3		Stony Brook	W 83–78 ^{OT}	3–2	Webster Bank Arena (1,179); Bridgeport, CT
November 28, 2021*; 2:00 pm, ESPN3		Loyola (MD)	L 70–75	3–3	Webster Bank Arena (1,329); Bridgeport, CT
December 3, 2021; 7:00 pm, ESPN3		at Canisius	W 74–68	4–3 (1–0)	Koessler Athletic Center (849); Buffalo, NY
December 5, 2021; 1:00 pm, ESPN3		at Niagara	W 81–71	5–3 (2–0)	Gallagher Center (607); Lewiston, NY
December 8, 2021*; 7:00 pm, ESPN3		Holy Cross	W 74–59	6–3	Webster Bank Arena (1,275); Bridgeport, CT
December 12, 2021*; 1:00 pm, FloHoops		at William & Mary	W 70–47	7–3	Kaplan Arena (1,673); Williamsburg, VA
December 15, 2021*; 7:00 pm, NEC Front Row		at Fairleigh Dickinson	W 72–54	8–3	Rothman Center (459); Hackensack, NJ
December 19, 2021*; 1:00 pm, NESN		at UMass	L 73–77 ^{OT}	8–4	Mullins Center (1,322); Amherst, MA
December 23, 2021*; 2:00 pm, ESPN3		Wagner	L 50–63	8–5	Webster Bank Arena (1,285); Bridgeport, CT
January 7, 2022; 7:00 pm, ESPN+		Marist	L 51–60	8–6 (2–1)	Webster Bank Arena (1,261); Bridgeport, CT
January 9, 2022; 2:00 pm, ESPN3		at Siena	L 62–69	8–7 (2–2)	Times Union Center (4,918); Albany, NY
January 11, 2022; 2:00 pm, ESPN3		Iona; Rescheduled from January 2	L 76–80	8–8 (2–3)	Webster Bank Arena (1,647); Bridgeport, CT
January 16, 2022; 2:00 pm, ESPN3		at Quinnipiac	L 66–72	8–9 (2–4)	People's United Center (712); Hamden, CT
January 20, 2022; 7:30 pm, ESPN+		Monmouth	L 58–61	8–10 (2–5)	Webster Bank Arena (1,492); Bridgeport, CT
January 23, 2022; 2:00 pm, ESPN3		at Marist	W 69–66	9–10 (3–5)	McCann Arena (1,024); Poughkeepsie, NY
January 28, 2022; 7:00 pm, ESPN3		at Rider	W 76–65	10–10 (4–5)	Alumni Gymnasium (1,362); Lawrenceville, NJ
February 4, 2022; 7:00 pm, ESPN3		at Monmouth	L 56–59	10–11 (4–6)	OceanFirst Bank Center (1,572); West Long Branch, NJ
February 6, 2022; 2:00 pm, ESPN+		Siena	L 56–62	10–12 (4–7)	Webster Bank Arena (2,149); Bridgeport, CT
February 9, 2022; 7:00 pm, ESPN+		Quinnipiac	L 60–69	10–13 (4–8)	Webster Bank Arena (1,072); Bridgeport, CT
February 12, 2022; 1:00 pm, ESPN+		Niagara	W 73–53	11–13 (5–8)	Webster Bank Arena (1,476); Bridgeport, CT
February 14, 2022; 7:00 pm, ESPN+		Canisius	W 80–76 ^{OT}	12–13 (6–8)	Webster Bank Arena (1,041); Bridgeport, CT
February 16, 2022; 1:00 pm, ESPN+		Manhattan; Rescheduled from December 31	L 67–74	12–14 (6–9)	Webster Bank Arena (984); Bridgeport, CT
February 18, 2022; 7:00 pm, ESPNU		Saint Peter's	L 59–70	12–15 (6–10)	Webster Bank Arena (1,611); Bridgeport, CT
February 20, 2022; 1:00 pm, ESPN3		at Iona	L 58–76	12–16 (6–11)	Hynes Athletic Center (2,594); New Rochelle, NY
February 27, 2022; 2:00 pm, ESPN3		at Manhattan	W 66–62	13–16 (7–11)	Draddy Gymnasium (478); Riverdale, NY
March 3, 2022; 7:30 pm, ESPN+		Rider	W 65–59	14–16 (8–11)	Webster Bank Arena (1,411); Bridgeport, CT
March 5, 2022; 1:00 pm, ESPN3		at Saint Peter's	L 41–57	14–17 (8–12)	Yanitelli Center (577); Jersey City, NJ
MAAC tournament
March 8, 2022; 7:00 pm, ESPN+	(7)	vs. (10) Canisius; First Round	W 72–50	15–17	Boardwalk Hall; Atlantic City, NJ
March 9, 2022; 9:30 pm, ESPN+	(7)	vs. (2) Saint Peter's; Quarterfinals	L 63–77	15–18	Boardwalk Hall; Atlantic City, NJ
*Non-conference game. ^{#}Rankings from AP Poll. (#) Tournament seedings in parentheses. All times are in Eastern.
