= 2021–22 Canisius Golden Griffins men's basketball team =

American college basketball season

2021–22 Canisius Golden Griffins men's basketball
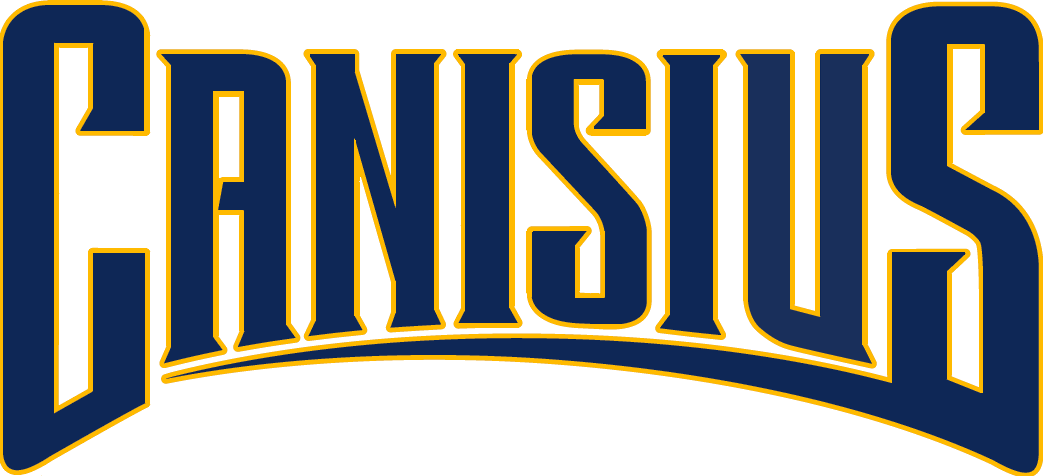
- Conference: Metro Atlantic Athletic Conference
- Record: 11–21 (7–13 MAAC)
- Head coach: Reggie Witherspoon (6th season)
- Assistant coaches: Chris Hawkins; Thurman Schaetzle; Calvin Cage
- Home arena: Koessler Athletic Center

2021–22 MAAC men's basketball standings
	Conf.				Overall
Team	W		L	PCT	W		L	PCT
Iona	17	–	3	.850	25	–	8	.758
Saint Peter's †	14	–	6	.700	22	–	12	.647
Siena	12	–	8	.600	15	–	14	.517
Monmouth	11	–	9	.550	21	–	13	.618
Niagara	9	–	11	.450	14	–	16	.467
Marist	9	–	11	.450	14	–	16	.467
Fairfield	8	–	12	.400	15	–	18	.455
Manhattan	8	–	12	.400	15	–	15	.500
Rider	8	–	12	.400	14	–	19	.424
Canisius	7	–	13	.350	11	–	21	.344
Quinnipiac	7	–	13	.350	14	–	17	.452
† 2022 MAAC tournament winner

The 2021–22 Canisius Golden Griffins men's basketball team represented Canisius College in the 2021–22 NCAA Division I men's basketball season. The Golden Griffins, led by sixth-year head coach Reggie Witherspoon, played their home games at the Koessler Athletic Center in Buffalo, New York as members of the Metro Atlantic Athletic Conference.

== Previous season ==
The Golden Griffins finished the 2020–21 season 7–6, 7–5 in MAAC play to finish in a tie for fifth place. As the No. 6 seed in the MAAC tournament, they were upset in the first round by No. 11 seed Rider.

== Roster ==
2021–22 Canisius Golden Griffins men's basketball team
Players
Coaches

Pos.	#	Name	Height	Weight	Year	Hometown
G	0	Akrum Ahemed	6 ft 5 in (1.96 m)	200 lb (91 kg)	Jr	Hackensack, NJ
G	1	Ahamadou Fofana	6 ft 1 in (1.85 m)	175 lb (79 kg)	Sr	Bronx, NY
F	2	Malek Green	6 ft 7 in (2.01 m)	220 lb (100 kg)	Sr	Cincinnati, OH
G	3	Jordan Henderson	6 ft 5 in (1.96 m)	190 lb (86 kg)	Sr	Cincinnati, OH
G	5	Siem Uijtendaal	6 ft 6 in (1.98 m)	185 lb (84 kg)	So	Haarlem, Netherlands
F	10	Jacco Fritz	6 ft 10 in (2.08 m)	215 lb (98 kg)	Jr	Tiel, Netherlands
G	11	Armon Harried	6 ft 5 in (1.96 m)	200 lb (91 kg)	Jr	Baltimore, MD
G	12	Asa Beyah	6 ft 3 in (1.91 m)	210 lb (95 kg)	So	Utica, NY
F	21	Scott Hitchon	6 ft 8 in (2.03 m)	230 lb (104 kg)	GS	Whitby, Ontario
F	22	George Maslennikov	6 ft 10 in (2.08 m)	240 lb (109 kg)	Sr	Odesa, Ukraine
G	25	Xzavier Long	6 ft 7 in (2.01 m)	190 lb (86 kg)	Fr	Washington, D.C.
G	33	Brandon Kulakowski	6 ft 3 in (1.91 m)	180 lb (82 kg)	Fr	Brewerton, NY
G	44	Tahj Staveskie	6 ft 0 in (1.83 m)	165 lb (75 kg)	Fr	Sandusky, OH

Head coach

- Reggie Witherspoon (Wheeling)

Assistant coach(es)

- Chris Hawkins (Radford)
- Thurman Schaetzle (Canisius)
- Calvin Cage (Buffalo)

Legend

- (C) Team captain
- (S) Suspended
- (I) Ineligible
- (W) Walk-on
- Injured
- Current redshirt

Roster
Last update: November 30, 2021

== Schedule and results ==
Date time, TV	Rank^{#}	Opponent^{#}	Result	Record	Site (attendance) city, state
Exhibition
October 24, 2021*; 2:00 pm		Wheeling	W 101–64	–	Koessler Athletic Center; Buffalo, NY
Regular season
November 9, 2021*; 7:30 pm, ACCN		at Miami (FL)	L 67–77	0–1	Watsco Center (3,234); Coral Gables, FL
November 12, 2021*; 7:00 pm, ESPN+		at East Carolina	L 71–83	0–2	Williams Arena (3,507); Greenville, NC
November 14, 2021*; 5:00 pm, ESPN+		at No. 23 St. Bonaventure	L 60–69	0–3	Reilly Center (3,943); St. Bonaventure, NY
November 20, 2021*; 2:00 pm, ESPN+		at Cleveland State; Cerebro Sports Lake Erie Challenge	L 70–80	0–4	Wolstein Center (1,492); Cleveland, OH
November 22, 2021*; 7:00 pm, ESPN3		Fredonia	W 106–40	1–4	Koessler Athletic Center (762); Buffalo, NY
November 24, 2021*; 2:00 pm, ESPN3		Coppin State; Cerebro Sports Lake Erie Challenge	W 76–75	2–4	Koessler Athletic Center (801); Buffalo, NY
November 29, 2021*; 7:00 pm, ESPN3		Cornell	L 75–89	2–5	Koessler Athletic Center (856); Buffalo, NY
December 3, 2021; 7:00 pm, ESPN3		Fairfield	L 68–74	2–6 (0–1)	Koessler Athletic Center (849); Buffalo, NY
December 5, 2021; 1:00 pm, ESPN3		Monmouth	L 65–79	2–7 (0–2)	Koessler Athletic Center (736); Buffalo, NY
December 8, 2021*; 7:00 pm, ESPN+		at Northern Kentucky	L 62–75	2–8	BB&T Arena (2,235); Highland Heights, KY
December 11, 2021*; 2:00 pm, ESPN+		at Youngstown State	L 43–71	2–9	Beeghly Center (2,630); Youngstown, OH
December 18, 2021*; 5:00 pm		vs. Buffalo	W 65–64	3–9	KeyBank Center (3,686); Buffalo, NY
December 22, 2021*; 7:00 pm, ESPN3		Florida Gulf Coast	W 97–90 ^{OT}	4–9	Koessler Athletic Center (735); Buffalo, NY
January 11, 2022; 2:00 pm, ESPN+		Quinnipiac	W 79–67	5–9 (1–2)	Koessler Athletic Center (871); Buffalo, NY
January 13, 2022; 7:00 pm, ESPN+		at Niagara; Battle of the Bridge	L 58–68	5–10 (1–3)	Gallagher Center (1,156); Lewiston, NY
January 16, 2022; 2:00 pm, ESPN+		at Manhattan	L 75–80	5–11 (1–4)	Draddy Gymnasium (376); Riverdale, NY
January 18, 2022; 2:00 pm, ESPN+		at Saint Peter's; Rescheduled from December 31	L 57–65	5–12 (1–5)	Run Baby Run Arena (281); Jersey City, NJ
January 21, 2022; 7:00 pm, ESPN3		Rider	W 70–69	6–12 (2–5)	Koessler Athletic Center (969); Buffalo, NY
January 23, 2022; 1:00 pm, ESPN3		Saint Peter's	W 63–60	7–12 (3–5)	Koessler Athletic Center (782); Buffalo, NY
January 28, 2022; 7:00 pm, ESPN+		at Monmouth	L 67–72	7–13 (3–6)	OceanFirst Bank Center (1,558); West Long Branch, NJ
January 30, 2022; 2:00 pm, ESPN+		at Rider	L 62–70	7–14 (3–7)	Alumni Gymnasium (1,312); Lawrenceville, NJ
February 1, 2022; 7:00 pm, ESPN+		at Siena; Rescheduled from January 2	L 65–73	7–15 (3–8)	MVP Arena (4,788); Albany, NY
February 4, 2022; 7:00 pm, ESPN3		Iona	L 62–70	7–16 (3–9)	Koessler Athletic Center (905); Buffalo, NY
February 6, 2022; 1:00 pm, ESPN3		Manhattan	W 77–70	8–16 (4–9)	Koessler Athletic Center (1,042); Buffalo, NY
February 12, 2022; 7:00 pm, ESPN+		at Marist	L 70–71	8–17 (4–10)	McCann Arena (1,020); Poughkeepsie, NY
February 14, 2022; 7:00 pm, ESPN+		at Fairfield	L 76–80 ^{OT}	8–18 (4–11)	Webster Bank Arena (1,041); Bridgeport, CT
February 19, 2022; 1:00 pm, ESPN3		Niagara; Battle of the Bridge	L 54–65	8–19 (4–12)	Koessler Athletic Center (1,207); Buffalo, NY
February 25, 2022; 7:00 pm, ESPN+		at Iona	L 65–72	8–20 (4–13)	Hynes Athletic Center (2,207); New Rochelle, NY
February 27, 2022; 2:00 pm, ESPN+		at Quinnipiac	W 72–67	9–20 (5–13)	People's United Center (1,020); Hamden, CT
March 3, 2022; 7:00 pm, ESPN3		Marist	W 78–67	10–20 (6–13)	Koessler Athletic Center (914); Buffalo, NY
March 5, 2022; 4:00 pm, ESPN3		Siena	W 67–64	11–20 (7–13)	Koessler Athletic Center (1,119); Buffalo, NY
MAAC tournament
March 8, 2022; 7:00 p.m., ESPN+	(10)	vs. (7) Fairfield; First Round	L 50–72	11–21	Boardwalk Hall; Atlantic City, NJ
*Non-conference game. ^{#}Rankings from AP Poll. (#) Tournament seedings in parentheses. All times are in Eastern.
