= Greg Paulus =

American basketball and football player (born 1986)

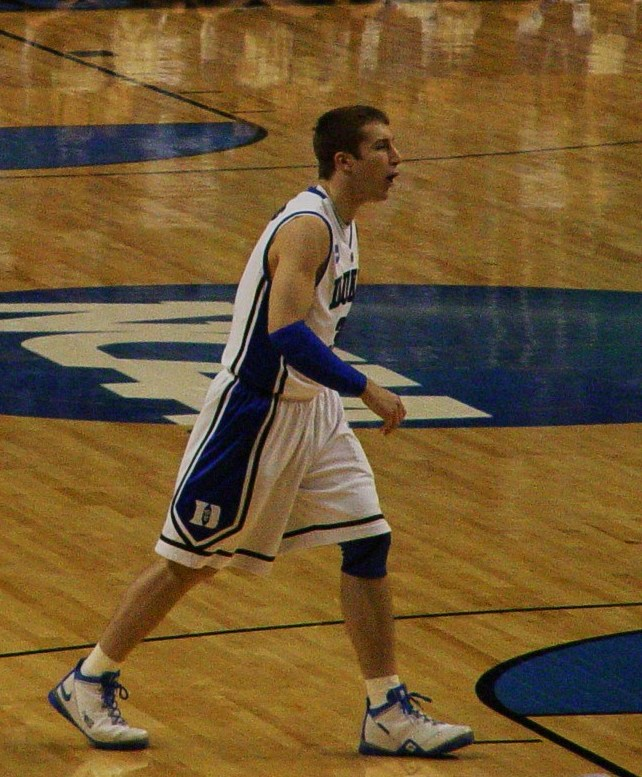
- Paulus with Duke in 2009

Niagara Purple Eagles
- Title: Head coach
- League: Metro Atlantic Athletic Conference

Personal information
- Born: July 3, 1986 (age 40) Medina, Ohio, U.S.
- Listed height: 6 ft 1 in (1.85 m)
- Listed weight: 180 lb (82 kg)

Career information
- High school: Christian Brothers Academy (DeWitt, New York)
- College: Duke (2005–2009)
- Position: Point guard
- Number: 3, 2
- Coaching career: 2010–present

Career history

Coaching
- 2010–2011: Navy (assistant)
- 2011–2017: Ohio State (assistant)
- 2017–2018: Louisville (assistant)
- 2018–2019: George Washington (assistant)
- 2019–present: Niagara

Career highlights
- As player: Third-team All-ACC (2008); ACC All-Freshman team (2006); McDonald's All-American (2005); Second-team Parade All-American (2005); Gatorade National HS Athlete of the Year (2005); Mr. New York Basketball (2005)

Gregory Russell Paulus (born July 3, 1986) is an American basketball coach and former player who is the head coach of the Niagara Purple Eagles men's basketball team. He previously served as an assistant basketball coach for Louisville, Ohio State and George Washington University. Paulus is a former multi-sport athlete, playing college basketball as a point guard on the Duke University men's team and later football at Syracuse University.

== Biography ==
Greg Paulus was born in Medina, Ohio, and grew up in Appleton, Wisconsin, before moving to the Syracuse suburb of Manlius, New York. He has six siblings: David, Matt, Dan, Chris, Mike and Sarah. He was named Gatorade Athlete of the Year due to his accomplishments in football and basketball. Paulus was the quarterback of the 2004 Christian Brothers Academy football team, which won the New York State Championship by defeating New Rochelle High School and future NFL player Ray Rice 41–35 in the title game at the Carrier Dome in Syracuse. Paulus was also named New York State Mr. Basketball following his senior season at CBA. He was ranked as the number one recruit out of high school.

=== College basketball ===
Paulus received scholarship offers to play football at the University of Miami and Notre Dame. He also received basketball scholarship offers from Duke, Syracuse, Georgetown, Florida and North Carolina. He chose to play basketball and joined Duke.

==== Freshman ====
Paulus was a member of the Duke team that finished with a 32–4 record and won the Atlantic Coast Conference (ACC) regular-season and tournament championship. Paulus led the ACC in assists per game at 5.2. He set a Duke freshman record for assists in a game with 15 (with three turnovers) in a 104–77 home victory over Valparaiso on December 18, 2005; that assist total was only one away from the all-time single-game Duke record of 16, set by NCAA career assist leader Bobby Hurley. He was selected for the All-America freshman 2nd team.

His 187 assists ranked third behind Bobby Hurley (288 in 1990) and Jay Williams (220 in 2000) among the freshman assist leaders in Duke history.

==== Sophomore ====
Paulus injured his foot during the preseason. After the season, associate coach Chris Collins said Paulus struggled because he had a tarsal coalition, and it was corrected through surgery. He had a career high with 25 points against Virginia Commonwealth on March 15, 2007.

==== Junior ====
Paulus led Duke to a 28–6 record including an 89–78 victory over rival UNC in which Paulus led Duke in scoring with 18 points. He led the Atlantic Coast Conference in assist-to-turnover ratio during the 2007–08 season and shot over 42 percent from beyond the arc on his way to making 82 three-point field goals.

==== Senior ====
After being the starting point guard for three years, Paulus started only five games during his senior season. Paulus averaged 16 minutes a game, in part due to the development of sophomore guard Nolan Smith.

=== Football ===
Paulus announced on May 14, 2009, that he would play college football at Syracuse University. Paulus was named the starting quarterback for the 2009 season.

He won four games and lost eight during his lone season at Syracuse, completing 67.7 percent of his passes and throwing for 2,025 yards and 13 touchdowns, and threw a school- and Big East-record five interceptions in one game against South Florida.

== Professional career ==
Paulus tried out with the NFL's New Orleans Saints in May 2010. Contrary to initial reports, he was not offered a contract. He got another shot with the Saints in June 2010 when he was again invited to minicamp.

== Career statistics ==
=== Basketball ===
Legend
GP	Games played	GS	Games started	MPG	Minutes per game
FG%	Field goal percentage	3P%	3-point field goal percentage	FT%	Free throw percentage
RPG	Rebounds per game	APG	Assists per game	SPG	Steals per game
BPG	Blocks per game	PPG	Points per game	**Bold**	Career high

Year	Team	GP	GS	MPG	FG%	3P%	FT%	RPG	APG	SPG	BPG	PPG
**2005–06**	**Duke**	**36**	**33**	32.3	.373	.314	.784	**2.8**	**5.2**	**1.6**	–	6.7
**2006–07**	**Duke**	33	29	**32.4**	**.456**	**.450**	.753	2.2	3.8	1.2	**.1**	**11.8**
**2007–08**	**Duke**	34	**33**	27.7	.423	.423	**.827**	2.1	3.2	1.5	**.1**	11.4
**2008–09**	**Duke**	**36**	5	16.1	.373	.336	.692	1.3	1.3	.8	.0	4.9
Career		139	100	27.0	.415	.398	.775	2.1	3.4	1.2	.0	8.6

=== Football ===
Season	Team	Games			Passing								Rushing			
Season	Team	GP	GS	Record	Cmp	Att	Pct	Yds	Y/A	TD	Int	Rtg	Att	Yds	Avg	TD
2009	Syracuse	12	12	4−8	193	285	67.7	2,024	7.1	13	14	132.6	51	-12	-0.2	1

== Coaching career ==
Paulus was hired as an assistant basketball coach at Navy in August 2010.

Paulus was hired as the basketball video coordinator for Ohio State University in May 2011. Paulus was promoted to assistant coach for Ohio State University in the summer of 2013.

In the fall of 2017, Paulus left Ohio State and was hired to be an assistant coach for the Louisville Cardinals under interim head coach David Padgett. Paulus was not retained for assistant under new Louisville head coach Chris Mack following the end of the season.

Paulus was then hired as an assistant coach for the George Washington Colonials men's basketball for the 2018–19 season and following this season, he returned to New York State and joined the Niagara Purple Eagles men's basketball team to be an assistant coach on Patrick Beilein's staff. On October 24, 2019, Paulus was named Niagara's interim head coach after Beilein resigned for "personal reasons". It was later announced that Paulus would become the permanent head coach.

== Head coaching record ==
Record table
Season	Team	Overall	Conference	Standing	Postseason
Niagara Purple Eagles (Metro Atlantic Athletic Conference) (2019–2026)
2019–20	Niagara	12–20	9–11	T–6th	
2020–21	Niagara	9–11	7–9	5th	
2021–22	Niagara	14–16	9–11	5th	
2022–23	Niagara	16–15	10–10	T–5th	
2023–24	Niagara	16–16	11–9	6th	
2024–25	Niagara	11–20	6–14	12th	
2025–26	Niagara	8–22	5–15	T–11th	
Niagara Purple Eagles (Metro Conference) (2026–present)
2026–27	Niagara	1–4	0–0		
Niagara:		87–124 (.412)	57–78 (.422)		
Total:		87–124 (.412)			
National champion Postseason invitational champion Conference regular season champion Conference regular season and conference tournament champion Division regular season champion Division regular season and conference tournament champion Conference tournament champion

== Awards and honors ==
Awards are for basketball unless otherwise noted.

- Gatorade Male Athlete of the Year (all sports)
- 2005 Gatorade New York state Player of the Year
- Four-time all-state
- All-America status in 2005 according to McDonald's, Parade, EA and Student Sports
- New York State Mr. Basketball as a senior
- National High School Coaches Association senior athlete of the year
- 2004 Gatorade National Football Player of the Year
- USA Basketball Junior National Select team for the 2005 Nike Hoops Summit
- 2005–06 Freshman All-America Second Team
- 2006 ACC All-Tournament Second Team
- 2007–08 Third team All-ACC selection
- 2008 Third team Academic All-America
- 2009 Third team Academic All-America
- Three-time ACC All-Academic team

== See also ==
- 2009 NCAA Men's Basketball All-Americans
