= 2021–22 Quinnipiac Bobcats men's basketball team =

American college basketball season

2021–22 Quinnipiac Bobcats men's basketball
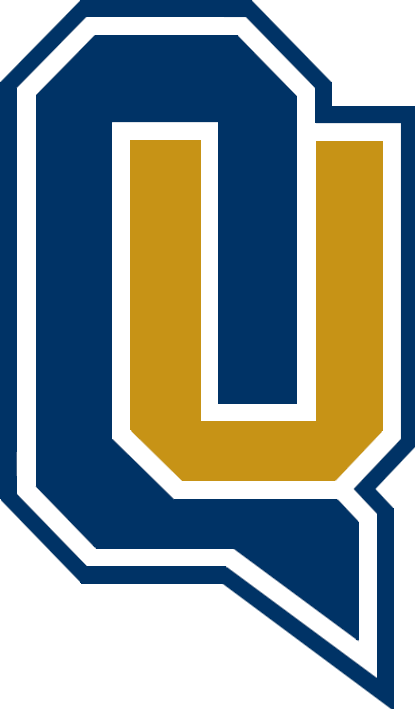
- Conference: Metro Atlantic Athletic Conference
- Record: 14–17 (7–13 MAAC)
- Head coach: Baker Dunleavy (5th season)
- Associate head coach: Tom Pecora
- Assistant coaches: Shaun Morris; Dwayne Lee
- Home arena: People's United Center

2021–22 MAAC men's basketball standings
	Conf.				Overall
Team	W		L	PCT	W		L	PCT
Iona	17	–	3	.850	25	–	8	.758
Saint Peter's †	14	–	6	.700	22	–	12	.647
Siena	12	–	8	.600	15	–	14	.517
Monmouth	11	–	9	.550	21	–	13	.618
Niagara	9	–	11	.450	14	–	16	.467
Marist	9	–	11	.450	14	–	16	.467
Fairfield	8	–	12	.400	15	–	18	.455
Manhattan	8	–	12	.400	15	–	15	.500
Rider	8	–	12	.400	14	–	19	.424
Canisius	7	–	13	.350	11	–	21	.344
Quinnipiac	7	–	13	.350	14	–	17	.452
† 2022 MAAC tournament winner

The 2021–22 Quinnipiac Bobcats men's basketball team represented Quinnipiac University in the 2021–22 NCAA Division I men's basketball season. The Bobcats, led by fifth-year head coach Baker Dunleavy, played their home games at People's United Center in Hamden, Connecticut as members of the Metro Atlantic Athletic Conference.

== Previous season ==
In a season limited due to the ongoing COVID-19 pandemic, the Bobcats finished the 2020–21 season 9–13, 7–10 in MAAC play to finish in a tie for fifth place. As the No. 8 seed in the MAAC tournament, they lost in the first round to Iona.

== Roster ==
2021–22 Quinnipiac Bobcats men's basketball team
Players
Coaches

Pos.	#	Name	Height	Weight	Year	Hometown
F	0	Kevin Marfo	6 ft 9 in (2.06 m)	245 lb (111 kg)	GS	Bergenfield, New Jersey
G/F	1	Tymu Chenery	6 ft 6 in (1.98 m)	190 lb (86 kg)	So	Philadelphia, Pennsylvania
G	2	Matt Balanc	6 ft 4 in (1.93 m)	195 lb (88 kg)	RS Jr	Silver Spring, Maryland
G	3	Savion Lewis	6 ft 1 in (1.85 m)	160 lb (73 kg)	RS Jr	Dix Hills, New York
F	4	Brody Limric	6 ft 9 in (2.06 m)	200 lb (91 kg)	Fr	Glastonbury, Connecticut
G	5	Tyrese Williams	6 ft 3 in (1.91 m)	186 lb (84 kg)	Sr	Beacon, New York
G	11	Dezi Jones	5 ft 10 in (1.78 m)	167 lb (76 kg)	So	Hannibal, Missouri
G	12	Bernie Blunt	6 ft 0 in (1.83 m)	175 lb (79 kg)	Fr	Morgantown, Pennsylvania
G	14	Quinn Guth	6 ft 2 in (1.88 m)	—	Fr	Brookfield, Connecticut
G	15	Luis Kortright	6 ft 3 in (1.91 m)	204 lb (93 kg)	So	Manhattan, New York
G/F	20	Brendan McGuire	6 ft 7 in (2.01 m)	190 lb (86 kg)	Jr	Garden City, New York
F	22	Elias King	6 ft 9 in (2.06 m)	218 lb (99 kg)	Jr	Sacramento, California
F	23	JJ Riggins	6 ft 6 in (1.98 m)	245 lb (111 kg)	RS So	Philadelphia, Pennsylvania
F	25	Jacob Rigoni	6 ft 6 in (1.98 m)	215 lb (98 kg)	GS	Adelaide, Australia
G	53	Brendan Martin	5 ft 7 in (1.7 m)	150 lb (68 kg)	Sr	South Setauket, New York

Head coach

- Baker Dunleavy (Villanova)

Assistant coach(es)

- Tom Pecora (Adelphi)
- Shaun Morris (Lycoming)
- Dwayne Lee (Saint Joseph's)

Legend

- (C) Team captain
- (S) Suspended
- (I) Ineligible
- (W) Walk-on
- Injured
- Current redshirt

Roster
Last update: November 24, 2021

== Schedule and results ==
The Bobcats had their scheduled game against Penn State canceled due to positive COVID-19 tests at PSU.

Date time, TV	Rank^{#}	Opponent^{#}	Result	Record	Site (attendance) city, state
Regular season
November 9, 2021*; 7:00 pm, BTN+		at No. 21 Maryland	L 69–83	0–1	Xfinity Center (12,832); College Park, MD
November 12, 2021*; 4:00 pm, ESPN3		Western New England	W 103–52	1–1	People's United Center (1,010); Hamden, CT
November 15, 2021*; 7:00 pm, ESPN+		Holy Cross	W 76–68	2–1	People's United Center (985); Hamden, CT
November 20, 2021*; 1:00 pm, ESPN+		Central Connecticut	W 76–65	3–1	People's United Center (623); Hamden, CT
November 23, 2021*; 4:00 pm, ESPN3		at New Hampshire	L 69–84	3–2	Lundholm Gym (402); Durham, NH
November 28, 2021*; 4:00 pm, ESPN3		Brown	L 61–72	3–3	People's United Center (533); Hamden, CT
December 3, 2021; 7:00 pm, ESPN3		Saint Peter's	L 59–69	3–4 (0–1)	People's United Center (1,059); Hamden, CT
December 5, 2021; 2:00 pm, ESPN+		at Manhattan	W 90–73	4–4 (1–1)	Draddy Gymnasium (1,203); Riverdale, NY
December 8, 2021*; 7:00 pm, ESPN+		at Dartmouth	W 72–69	5–4	Leede Arena (305); Hanover, NH
December 11, 2021*; 2:00 pm, ESPN3		Maine	W 73–47	6–4	People's United Center (714); Hamden, CT
December 22, 2021*; 7:00 pm, ESPN+		at Penn State	Canceled due to COVID-19 issues at Penn State		Bryce Jordan Center; University Park, PA
December 31, 2021; 2:00 pm, ESPN+		Niagara	W 77–68	7–4 (2–1)	People's United Center (523); Hamden, CT
January 9, 2022; 1:00 pm, ESPN3		at Niagara	L 67–79	7–5 (2–2)	Gallagher Center (871); Lewiston, NY
January 11, 2022; 2:00 pm, ESPN+		at Canisius	L 67–79	7–6 (2–3)	Koessler Athletic Center (871); Buffalo, NY
January 14, 2022; 7:00 pm, ESPN3		at Rider	W 77–70 ^{OT}	8–6 (3–3)	Alumni Gymnasium (1,428); Lawrenceville, NJ
January 16, 2022; 2:00 pm, ESPN3		Fairfield	W 72–66	9–6 (4–3)	People's United Center (712); Hamden, CT
January 19, 2022; 7:00 pm, ESPN+		Rider; Rescheduled from January 2	W 73–67	10–6 (5–3)	People's United Center (231); Hamden, CT
January 23, 2022; 2:00 pm, ESPN3		Iona	L 61–76	10–7 (5–4)	People's United Center (1,348); Hamden, CT
January 28, 2022; 7:30 pm, ESPN+		Marist	W 94–87	11–7 (6–4)	People's United Center (1,025); Hamden, CT
January 30, 2022; 2:00 pm, ESPN+		at Siena	L 76–85	11–8 (6–5)	MVP Arena (5,527); Albany, NY
February 4, 2022; 7:00 pm, ESPN3		at Saint Peter's	L 74–83	11–9 (6–6)	Run Baby Run Arena (777); Jersey City, NJ
February 6, 2022; 2:00 pm, ESPN+		Monmouth	L 63–76	11–10 (6–7)	People's United Center (835); Hamden, CT
February 9, 2022; 7:00 pm, ESPN+		at Fairfield	W 69–60	12–10 (7–7)	Webster Bank Arena (1,072); Bridgeport, CT
February 13, 2022; 2:00 pm, ESPN3		Manhattan	L 66–83	12–11 (7–8)	People's United Center (875); Hamden, CT
February 20, 2022; 2:00 pm, ESPN3		at Marist	L 66–67	12–12 (7–9)	McCann Arena (1,207); Poughkeepsie, NY
February 24, 2022; 7:00 pm, ESPN3		Siena	L 71–78	12–13 (7–10)	People's United Center (991); Hamden, CT
February 27, 2022; 2:00 pm, ESPN+		Canisius	L 67–72	12–14 (7–11)	People's United Center (1,020); Hamden, CT
March 3, 2022; 7:00 pm, ESPN3		at Monmouth	L 72–75	12–15 (7–12)	OceanFirst Bank Center (1,735); West Long Branch, NJ
March 5, 2022; 1:00 pm, ESPN3		at Iona	L 61–79	12–16 (7–13)	Hynes Athletic Center (2,594); New Rochelle, NY
MAAC tournament
March 8, 2022; 9:00 pm, ESPN+	(11)	vs. (6) Marist; First Round	W 77–52	13–16	Boardwalk Hall; Atlantic City, NJ
March 10, 2022; 7:00 pm, ESPN+	(11)	vs. (3) Siena; Quarterfinals	W 77–71	14–16	Boardwalk Hall; Atlantic City, NJ
March 11, 2022; 8:30 pm, ESPNews / ESPN+	(11)	vs. (2) Saint Peter's; Semifinals	L 52–64	14–17	Boardwalk Hall; Atlantic City, NJ
*Non-conference game. ^{#}Rankings from AP Poll. (#) Tournament seedings in parentheses. All times are in Eastern.
