= Jackson Stormo =

American basketball player (born 1999)

Free Agent
- Position: Power forward/Center

Personal information
- Born: November 16, 1999 (age 26) Santa Barbara, California, U.S.
- Listed height: 6 ft 9 in (2.06 m)
- Listed weight: 260 lb (118 kg)

Career information
- High school: San Marcos High School (Santa Barbara, California)
- College: Pepperdine University (2018–2020); Siena College (2020–2023)
- Playing career: 2023–present

Career history
- 2023: Imortal Basket Club
- 2023–2024: Hapoel Haifa
- 2024–2025: Kortrijk Spurs

Career highlights
- All-Metro Atlantic Athletic Conference (MAAC) Second Team (2023); Preseason Second Team All-MAAC (2022)

Jackson Stormo (born November 16, 1999) is an American professional basketball player who last player for Kortrijk Spurs of the BNXT League. A 6' 9" power forward and center, Stormo played college basketball for Pepperdine University and Siena College. He also played for Imortal Basket Club in Portugal.

== Early life ==
Stormo was born in Santa Barbara, California, to Owen and Alexia Stormo. His father competed in football, soccer, and track at California Lutheran University, and his mother played basketball at Fresno State. He has three older siblings, Jason, Brian, and Janell. He is 6 ft 9 in (2.06 m), and weighs 260 pounds (120 kg).

== High school ==
Stormo attended San Marcos High School. He played basketball and as a junior, he earned All-Channel League honors. In 2018 as a senior, he averaged 17.8 points, 12.8 rebounds, 2.6 blocks, and 2.3 assists a game. He was named the 2018 CIF Southern Section 2A Player of the Year, the Channel League MVP, and to the Cal-Hi Sports All-State D2 first team, and the San Marcos Male Athlete of the Year.

== College career ==
Stormo attended Pepperdine University, where he majored in sport administration. In 2018–19 as a freshman, playing center for the Pepperdine Waves he averaged 1.3 points and 1.2 rebounds in 6.1 minutes, and in 2019-20 he averaged 0.3 points and 1.0 rebounds in 4.1 minutes.

He then transferred to Siena College, where he received a bachelor's degree in Sports Communications. There, playing basketball as a junior at center for the Siena Saints in 2020-21 Stormo averaged 10.8 points and 5.5 rebounds in 25.2 minutes per game. He led the Metro Atlantic Athletic Conference (MAAC) shooting 65.5% from the floor.

Playing in his senior year in 2021–22 as a senior and team captain, Stormo averaged 11.1 points in 29.9 minutes per game. He was fourth in the MAAC in blocks per game (1.3), sixth in field goal percentage (.536), and eighth in rebounding (6.8). He was named to the MAAC All-Academic Team.

Stormo was named Preseason Second Team All-MAAC for the 2022–23 season. On January 9, 2023, he was named a Hercules Tires MAAC Men's Basketball Weekly Award Honoree, after averaging 21 points for the week. In 2022-23 playing for Siena he averaged 12.5 points and 5.4 rebounds per game, and was fourth in the MAAC in blocks per game for the second straight year (1.2), fifth in free throw percentage (.809), and eighth in total offensive rebounds (72). He was named All-MAAC Second Team at center.

== Professional career ==
=== Imortal ===
In August 2023, Stormo signed with the Imortal Basket Club in Portugal for the 2023–24 season. In nine games he averaged 12.44 points, 8.67 rebounds, and 1.3 blocks per game.

=== Hapoel Haifa ===
On December 8, 2023, Stormo then moved to Hapoel Haifa of the Israeli Basketball Premier League. He has played both forward and center for the team.

=== Kortrijk Spurs ===
On October 15, 2024, he signed with Kortrijk Spurs of the BNXT League.
