= Tyson Jolly =

American basketball player (born 1997)

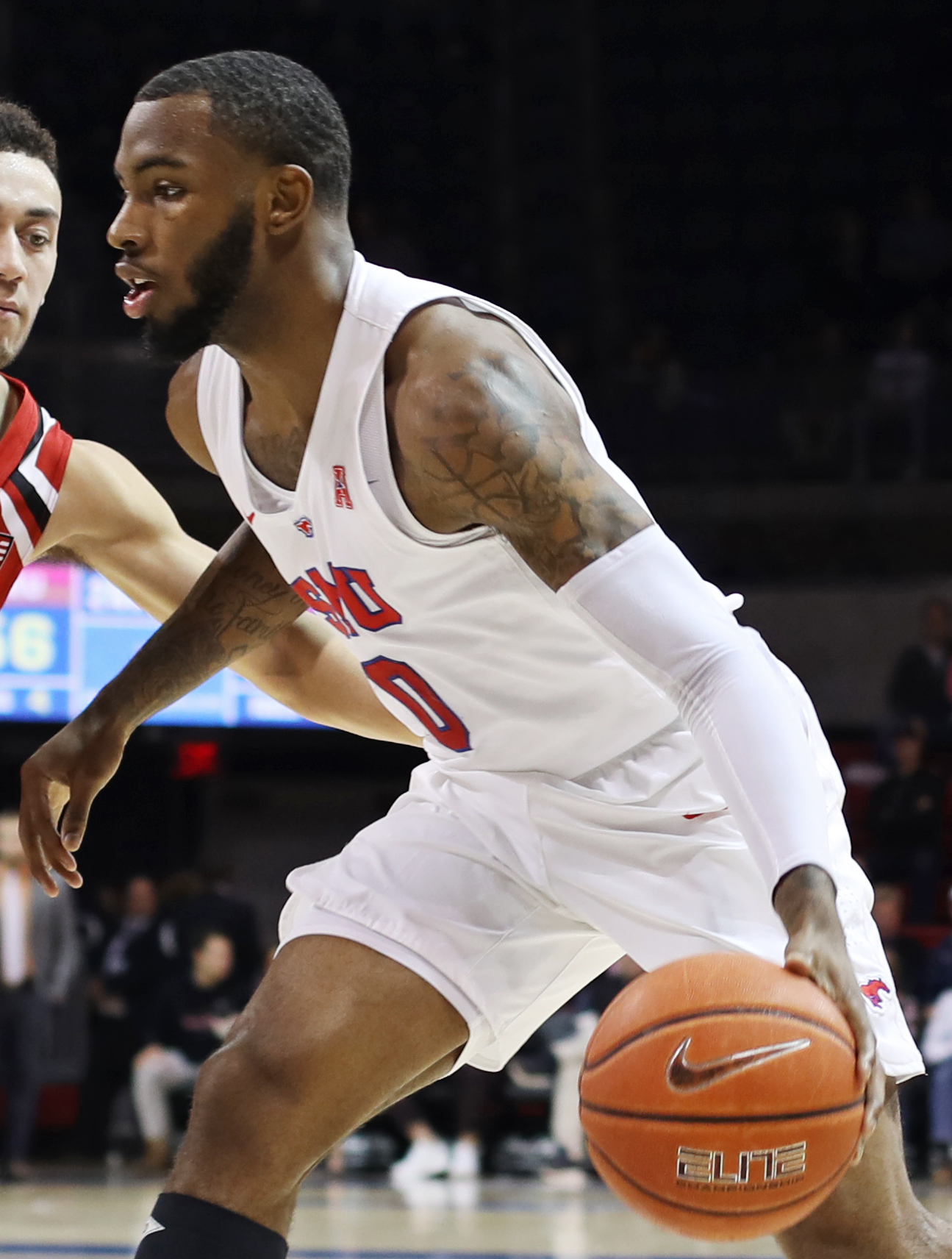
- Jolly with SMU in 2019

Personal information
- Born: August 10, 1997 (age 29) Muskogee, Oklahoma, U.S.
- Listed height: 6 ft 4 in (1.93 m)
- Listed weight: 205 lb (93 kg)

Career information
- High school: Putnam City West (Oklahoma City, Oklahoma); Elev8 Sports Institute (Delray Beach, Florida)
- College: Baylor (2017–2018); Trinity Valley CC (2018–2019); SMU (2019–2021); Iona (2021–2022)
- NBA draft: 2022: undrafted
- Playing career: 2023–present
- Position: Shooting guard

Career history
- 2023–2024: US Avignon Pontet Basket
- 2024: Haukar

Career highlights
- MAAC Player of the Year (2022); First-team All-MAAC (2022); Third-team All-AAC (2020); First-team NJCAA DI All-American (2019)

Tyson Malik Jolly (born August 10, 1997) is an American professional basketball player. He played college basketball for the Iona Gaels of the Metro Atlantic Athletic Conference (MAAC). He previously played for the Baylor Bears, the Trinity Valley CC Cardinals, and the SMU Mustangs.

== High school career ==
Jolly attended Putnam City West High School in Oklahoma City, Oklahoma. In late December 2013 during his junior season, he coughed up blood after a tournament and began receiving treatment for pneumonia. After his coughing continued and he collapsed in his school hallway in February 2014, Jolly was diagnosed with pulmonary embolism, causing him to miss the remainder of the season. He underwent a procedure to remove blood clots in his lungs and lost over 15 lbs (6.8 kg) due to the condition. As a senior, he averaged 20.2 points, 9.1 rebounds and three assists per game, leading his team to the Class 6A state semifinals. He was named The Oklahoman Big All-City Player of the Year. Jolly initially committed to playing college basketball for California but attended Elev8 Sports Institute in Delray Beach, Florida for a postgraduate year because he did not meet the academic credit requirement. He decommitted from California and instead chose to play for Baylor. He was considered a four-star recruit.

== College career ==
Jolly redshirted his first season at Baylor and received limited playing time as a redshirt freshman, averaging 1.4 points and 1.8 rebounds per game and shooting 20.9 percent from the field. After the season, he transferred to Trinity Valley Community College. On November 8, 2018, Jolly recorded a sophomore season-high 45 points and 15 rebounds in an 87–82 win over Missouri State–West Plains. As a sophomore, he averaged 22.6 points, 12.5 rebounds and four assists per game, leading the nation in rebounding. Jolly was a First Team National Junior College Athletic Association (NJCAA) Division I All-American and earned NJCAA Region XIV Player of the Year accolades. He was named MVP of the Region XIV Tournament.

Jolly was considered the third-best junior college recruit and joined SMU for his junior season. On January 18, 2020, he posted a season-high 25 points, including 22 in the second half, and 14 rebounds in a 68–52 victory over Temple. As a junior, Jolly averaged 14.5 points and 6.2 rebounds per game, shooting a team-high 38 percent from three-point range. He earned Third Team All-American Athletic Conference (AAC) honors. Prior to his senior season, Jolly stopped practicing with the team and did not join them for the first six weeks for personal reasons. He made his season debut on January 23, 2021. As a senior, Jolly played eight games, averaging 9.3 points and 4.8 rebounds per game. After the season, he transferred to Iona.

On November 25, 2021, Jolly scored 13 points in a 72–68 upset of tenth ranked-Alabama, the first ever win against an AP Top-10 by a Metro Atlantic Athletic Conference (MAAC) opponent. At the close of the 2021–22 season, Jolly was named the MAAC Player of the Year.

== Professional career ==
After going undrafted in the 2022 NBA draft, Jolly joined the Greensboro Swarm training camp roster. However, he did not make the final roster. In November 2023, Jolly signed with US Avignon Pontet Basket of the French Nationale Masculine 1.

In July 2024, Jolly signed with Haukar of the Icelandic Úrvalsdeild karla. He was released by the club as it entered the Christmas break on 17 December 2024.

== Career statistics ==
Legend
GP	Games played	GS	Games started	MPG	Minutes per game
FG%	Field goal percentage	3P%	3-point field goal percentage	FT%	Free throw percentage
RPG	Rebounds per game	APG	Assists per game	SPG	Steals per game
BPG	Blocks per game	PPG	Points per game	**Bold**	Career high

=== College ===
==== NCAA Division I ====
Year	Team	GP	GS	MPG	FG%	3P%	FT%	RPG	APG	SPG	BPG	PPG
2016–17	Baylor	Redshirt										
2017–18	Baylor	20	0	8.9	.209	.105	.700	1.8	.9	.2	.3	1.4
2019–20	SMU	30	30	**34.9**	**.458**	.382	**.780**	**6.2**	**2.3**	**.7**	.5	14.5
2020–21	SMU	8	1	24.4	.431	**.391**	.600	4.8	.8	.3	.5	9.3
2021–22	Iona	**33**	**33**	33.8	.436	.374	.699	4.8	**2.3**	**.7**	**.8**	**14.6**
Career		91	64	27.9	.432	.362	.724	4.6	1.9	.6	.5	11.2

==== JUCO ====
Year	Team	GP	GS	MPG	FG%	3P%	FT%	RPG	APG	SPG	BPG	PPG
2018–19	Trinity Valley CC	36	36	–	.506	.351	.781	12.5	4.0	1.6	1.5	22.6

== Personal life ==
Jolly is the son of Neoshia Jolly.
