= 2021–22 Loyola Greyhounds men's basketball team =

American college basketball season

2021–22 Loyola Greyhounds men's basketball
- Conference: Patriot League
- Record: 14–16 (8–10 Patriot)
- Head coach: Tavaras Hardy (4th season)
- Assistant coaches: Ivo Simović; Taj Finger; Corin 'Tiny' Adams
- Home arena: Reitz Arena

2021–22 Patriot League men's basketball standings
	Conf.				Overall
Team	W		L	PCT	W		L	PCT
Colgate †	16	–	2	.889	23	–	12	.657
Navy	12	–	6	.667	21	–	11	.656
Boston University	11	–	7	.611	22	–	13	.629
Lehigh	10	–	8	.556	13	–	19	.406
Army	9	–	9	.500	15	–	16	.484
Loyola	8	–	10	.444	14	–	16	.467
Holy Cross	7	–	11	.389	9	–	22	.290
Lafayette	7	–	11	.389	10	–	20	.333
Bucknell	5	–	13	.278	9	–	23	.281
American	5	–	13	.278	10	–	22	.313
† 2022 Patriot League tournament winner

The 2021–22 Loyola Greyhounds men's basketball team represented Loyola University Maryland in the 2021–22 NCAA Division I men's basketball season. The Greyhounds, led by fourth-year head coach Tavaras Hardy, played their home games at Reitz Arena in Baltimore, Maryland as members of the Patriot League.

== Previous season ==
The Greyhounds finished the 2020–21 season 6–11, 4–10 in Patriot League play to finish in last place in the South Division. As the #9 seed in the Patriot League tournament, they were scheduled to face Holy Cross in the first round, but a positive COVID-19 test within the Holy Cross program forced the Crusaders to forfeit the game, moving Loyola into the quarterfinals. In the quarterfinals, the Greyhounds upset top-seeded Navy. Their upset streak continued, upsetting #4 seed Army in the semifinals, advancing to the championship game. Their Cinderella run in the Patriot League Tournament would end in the championship game, where they lost to #2 seeded Colgate.

== Roster ==
2021–22 Loyola Greyhounds men's basketball team
Players
Coaches

Pos.	#	Name	Height	Weight	Year	Previous school	Hometown
G	0	Nick Marshall	6 ft 4 in (1.93 m)	180 lb (82 kg)	Fr	River Hill HS	Clarksville, MD
F	1	Veljko Ilic	6 ft 10 in (2.08 m)	230 lb (104 kg)	Fr	Hoosac School	Gornji Milanovac, Serbia
G	2	Jaylin Andrews	6 ft 4 in (1.93 m)	186 lb (84 kg)	Sr	Boys' Latin School of Maryland	Owings Mills, MD
G	3	Wade Jackson	6 ft 3 in (1.91 m)	183 lb (83 kg)	So	St. Vincent Pallotti HS	Washington, D.C.
F	4	Alonso Faure	6 ft 10 in (2.08 m)	221 lb (100 kg)	So	IES Fuente San Luis	Busot, Spain
G	5	Chris Kuzemka	6 ft 0 in (1.83 m)	175 lb (79 kg)	Fr	Centreville HS	Clifton, VA
F	10	Golden Dike	6 ft 10 in (2.08 m)	248 lb (112 kg)	Jr	Colegio SEK El Castillo International School	Málaga, Spain
F	11	Milos Ilic	6 ft 10 in (2.08 m)	230 lb (104 kg)	Fr	Hoosac School	Gornji Milanovac, Serbia
G	12	Cam Spencer	6 ft 4 in (1.93 m)	207 lb (94 kg)	Jr	Boys' Latin School of Maryland	Davidsonville, MD
F	13	Markese Redding	6 ft 6 in (1.98 m)	201 lb (91 kg)	Sr	LREI	Brooklyn, NY
G	15	Alex Jackson	5 ft 7 in (1.7 m)	156 lb (71 kg)	Jr	Boys' Latin School of Maryland	Baltimore, MD
G	21	Charlie Weisberg	6 ft 3 in (1.91 m)	185 lb (84 kg)	Fr	The Millbrook School	Brooklyn, NY
F	22	Casmir Ochiaka	6 ft 8 in (2.03 m)	235 lb (107 kg)	Sr	St. Mary of the Assumption HS	Enugu, Nigeria
G	23	David Brown III	6 ft 5 in (1.96 m)	215 lb (98 kg)	Fr	Bishop McNamara HS	La Plata, MD
G	24	Daraun Gray	5 ft 11 in (1.8 m)	177 lb (80 kg)	Jr	Landon School	Clarksburg, MD
G	25	Kenneth Jones	6 ft 0 in (1.83 m)	187 lb (85 kg)	Sr	Mater Dei Prep	Hillside, NJ

Head coach

- Tavaras Hardy (Northwestern)

Assistant coach(es)

- Ivo Simović (Union (Serbia))
- Taj Finger (Stanford)
- Corin 'Tiny' Adams (Morgan State)

Legend

- (C) Team captain
- (S) Suspended
- (I) Ineligible
- (W) Walk-on
- Injured
- Current redshirt

Roster
Last update: December 30, 2021

== Schedule and results ==
Date time, TV	Rank^{#}	Opponent^{#}	Result	Record	Site (attendance) city, state
Exhibition
November 1, 2021*; 7:00 pm, ESPN+		Johns Hopkins	W 60–49	–	Reitz Arena; Baltimore, MD
Non-conference regular season
November 9, 2021*; 7:00 pm, ACCN		at No. 19 North Carolina	L 67–83	0–1	Dean Smith Center (14,992); Chapel Hill, NC
November 12, 2021*; 4:00 pm		vs. South Carolina State; Rising Coaches Classic	W 75–65	1–1	TD Arena (150); Charleston, SC
November 13, 2021*; 5:00 pm, FloHoops		at College of Charleston; Rising Coaches Classic	L 72–79	1–2	TD Arena (4,166); Charleston, SC
November 14, 2021*; 10:30 am		vs. Lipscomb; Rising Coaches Classic	L 65–70	1–3	TD Arena (144); Charleston, SC
November 17, 2021*; 7:00 pm		at Coppin State	L 49–71	1–4	Physical Education Complex (400); Baltimore, MD
November 24, 2021*; 3:00 pm, ESPN+		Elizabethtown	W 69–42	2–4	Reitz Arena (378); Baltimore, MD
November 28, 2021*; 2:00 pm, ESPN3		at Fairfield	W 75–70	3–4	Webster Bank Arena (1,329); Bridgeport, CT
December 1, 2021*; 7:00 pm, ESPN+		Chicago State	W 78–64	4–4	Reitz Arena (814); Baltimore, MD
December 4, 2021*; 1:00 pm, ESPN+		Mount St. Mary's	W 61–55	5–4	Reitz Arena (1,121); Baltimore, MD
December 8, 2021*; 7:00 pm, ESPN+		at St. Bonaventure	L 71–84	5–5	Reilly Center (2,720); St. Bonaventure, NY
December 12, 2021*; 2:00 pm, ESPN+		Hampton	W 67–54	6–5	Reitz Arena (534); Baltimore, MD
December 18, 2021*; 4:00 pm, ACCN		at No. 2 Duke	Canceled due to COVID-19 protocols		Cameron Indoor Stadium; Durham, NC
December 21, 2021*; 7:00 pm, ESPN+		Goucher	Canceled due to COVID-19 protocols		Reitz Arena; Baltimore, MD
December 28, 2021*; 8:30 pm, BTN		at Maryland	Canceled due to COVID-19 protocols		Xfinity Center; College Park, MD
Patriot League regular season
January 1, 2022; 2:00 pm, ESPN+		at Army	L 74–77 ^{OT}	6–6 (0–1)	Christl Arena (623); West Point, NY
January 4, 2022; 7:00 pm, ESPN+		Holy Cross	W 79–70	7–6 (1–1)	Reitz Arena (250); Baltimore, MD
January 7, 2022; 5:00 pm, ESPN+		at Boston University	W 66–58	8–6 (2–1)	Case Gym (365); Boston, MA
January 10, 2022; 7:00 pm, ESPN+		Bucknell	W 71–67	9–6 (3–1)	Reitz Arena (250); Baltimore, MD
January 13, 2022; 7:00 pm, ESPN+		Lafayette	W 74–60	10–6 (4–1)	Reitz Arena (250); Baltimore, MD
January 16, 2022; 2:00 pm, CBSSN		at Lehigh	W 69–57	11–6 (5–1)	Stabler Arena (507); Bethlehem, PA
January 19, 2022; 7:00 pm, ESPN+		Boston University	L 50–67	11–7 (5–2)	Reitz Arena (250); Baltimore, MD
January 22, 2022; 2:00 pm, ESPN+		American	W 78–73	12–7 (6–2)	Reitz Arena (250); Baltimore, MD
January 24, 2022; 7:00 pm, CBSSN		at Colgate	L 52–65	12–8 (6–3)	Cotterell Court (639); Hamilton, NY
January 30, 2022; 6:00 pm, CBSSN		at Bucknell	L 80–82 ^{OT}	12–9 (6–4)	Sojka Pavilion (771); Lewisburg, PA
February 2, 2022; 7:00 pm, ESPN+		Army	W 61–57	13–9 (7–4)	Reitz Arena (704); Baltimore, MD
February 5, 2022; 5:00 pm, ESPN+		Navy	L 55–56	13–10 (7–5)	Reitz Arena (902); Baltimore, MD
February 9, 2022; 7:00 pm, ESPN+		at Holy Cross	L 64–68	13–11 (7–6)	Hart Center (584); Worcester, MA
February 12, 2022; 5:00 pm, ESPN+		Colgate	L 56–64	13–12 (7–7)	Reitz Arena (704); Baltimore, MD
February 16, 2022; 7:00 pm, ESPN+		at Lafayette	L 68–77	13–13 (7–8)	Kirby Sports Center (1,473); Easton, PA
February 20, 2022; 5:00 pm, ESPN+		Lehigh	W 69–42	14–13 (8–8)	Reitz Arena (1,212); Baltimore, MD
February 23, 2022; 7:00 pm, ESPN+		at Navy	L 50–52	14–14 (8–9)	Alumni Hall (1,016); Annapolis, MD
February 26, 2022; 2:00 pm, ESPN+		at American	L 55–65	14–15 (8–10)	Bender Arena (1,034); Washington, D.C.
Patriot League tournament
March 3, 2022; 7:00 pm, ESPN+	(6)	at (3) Boston University; Quarterfinals	L 64–76	14–16	Case Gym (652); Boston, MA
*Non-conference game. ^{#}Rankings from AP Poll. (#) Tournament seedings in parentheses. All times are in Eastern.
