= 2021–22 Colgate Raiders men's basketball team =

American college basketball season

2021–22 Colgate Raiders men's basketball

Patriot League regular season and tournament champions

NCAA tournament, First Round
- Conference: Patriot League
- Record: 23–12 (16–2 Patriot)
- Head coach: Matt Langel (11th season)
- Assistant coaches: Dave Klatsky; Mike Jordan; Pat Moore
- Home arena: Cotterell Court

2021–22 Patriot League men's basketball standings
	Conf.				Overall
Team	W		L	PCT	W		L	PCT
Colgate †	16	–	2	.889	23	–	12	.657
Navy	12	–	6	.667	21	–	11	.656
Boston University	11	–	7	.611	22	–	13	.629
Lehigh	10	–	8	.556	13	–	19	.406
Army	9	–	9	.500	15	–	16	.484
Loyola	8	–	10	.444	14	–	16	.467
Holy Cross	7	–	11	.389	9	–	22	.290
Lafayette	7	–	11	.389	10	–	20	.333
Bucknell	5	–	13	.278	9	–	23	.281
American	5	–	13	.278	10	–	22	.313
† 2022 Patriot League tournament winner

The 2021–22 Colgate Raiders men's basketball team represented Colgate University in the 2021–22 NCAA Division I men's basketball season. The Raiders, led by 11th-year head coach Matt Langel, played their home games at Cotterell Court in Hamilton, New York as members of the Patriot League. They finished the season 23–12, 16–2 and Patriot League play to finish as regular season champions for the second consecutive year. As the No. 1 seed, they defeated Bucknell, Lehigh, and Navy to win the Patriot League tournament. They received the conference’s automatic bid to the NCAA tournament for the second consecutive year. As the No. 14 seed in the Midwest Region, they lost in the first round of the NCAA Tournament to Wisconsin.

== Previous season ==
The Raiders finished the 2020–21 season 14–2, 11–1 in Patriot League play to finish atop the North Division. In the Patriot League tournament, they defeated Boston University in the quarterfinals, Bucknell in the semifinals, advancing to the championship game for the fourth consecutive year. There, they defeated Loyola (MD), earning the Patriot League's automatic berth into the NCAA tournament. They drew the #14 seed in the South Region, where they would lose to #3 seed Arkansas in the first round.

== Roster ==
2021–22 Colgate Raiders men's basketball team
Players
Coaches

Pos.	#	Name	Height	Weight	Year	Previous school	Hometown
G	0	Nelly Cummings	6 ft 0 in (1.83 m)	180 lb (82 kg)	Sr	Bowling Green	Midland, PA
G	2	Zach Light	6 ft 3 in (1.91 m)	195 lb (88 kg)	Sr	Northfield Mount Hermon	New York, NY
G	3	Pearson Parker	6 ft 1 in (1.85 m)	185 lb (84 kg)	Jr	Phillips Exeter	Los Angeles, CA
G/F	4	Ryan Moffatt	6 ft 6 in (1.98 m)	220 lb (100 kg)	Jr	Hempfield HS	Lancaster, PA
G	5	Nicolas Louis-Jacques	6 ft 4 in (1.93 m)	195 lb (88 kg)	Fr	Putnam Science Academy	Miami, FL
G	13	Jack Ferguson	6 ft 3 in (1.91 m)	180 lb (82 kg)	Sr	Homestead HS	Fort Wayne, IN
F	14	Keegan Records	6 ft 10 in (2.08 m)	250 lb (113 kg)	Jr	St. Andrew's	South Kingstown, RI
G	15	Tucker Richardson	6 ft 5 in (1.96 m)	210 lb (95 kg)	Sr	Blair Academy	Flemington, NJ
F	22	Malcolm Bailey	6 ft 10 in (2.08 m)	210 lb (95 kg)	Jr	Ridley College	Stratford, ON
F	30	Sam Thomson	6 ft 9 in (2.06 m)	230 lb (104 kg)	So	Brooks School	Kitchener–Waterloo, ON
G	33	Oliver Lynch-Daniels	6 ft 2 in (1.88 m)	190 lb (86 kg)	Sr	Houston Baptist	Chapel Hill, NC
G	34	Alex Capitano	6 ft 4 in (1.93 m)	200 lb (91 kg)	So	Episcopal Academy	Malvern, PA
F	35	Blake Henry	6 ft 8 in (2.03 m)	225 lb (102 kg)	Sr	Foothill College	Menlo Park, CA
C	55	Jeff Woodward	6 ft 11 in (2.11 m)	270 lb (122 kg)	So	Methacton HS	Audubon, PA

Head coach

- Matt Langel (Penn)

Assistant coach(es)

- Dave Klatsky (Penn)
- Mike Jordan (Penn)
- Pat Moore (Colgate)

Legend

- (C) Team captain
- (S) Suspended
- (I) Ineligible
- (W) Walk-on
- Injured
- Current redshirt

Roster
Last update: December 7, 2021

== Schedule and results ==
Date time, TV	Rank^{#}	Opponent^{#}	Result	Record	Site (attendance) city, state
Non-conference regular season
November 9, 2021*; 7:00 pm, ESPN+		Northeastern	W 65–58	1–0	Cotterell Court (1,013); Hamilton, NY
November 13, 2021*; 2:00 pm, ESPN+		at NC State	L 74–77	1–1	PNC Arena (11,949); Raleigh, NC
November 16, 2021*; 7:00 pm, ESPN+		at Cornell	L 68–78	1–2	Newman Arena (664); Ithaca, NY
November 18, 2021*; 7:00 pm, ESPN+		SUNY Poly	W 97–50	2–2	Cotterell Court (477); Hamilton, NY
November 20, 2021*; 5:00 pm, ACCNX		at Syracuse	W 100–85	3–2	Carrier Dome (15,604); Syracuse, NY
November 24, 2021*; 7:00 pm, ESPN+		at Harvard	L 84–89 ^{OT}	3–3	Lavietes Pavilion (1,061); Allston, MA
November 29, 2021*; 7:00 pm, ESPN+		Niagara	L 59–70	3–4	Cotterell Court (483); Hamilton, NY
December 3, 2021*; 7:00 pm		at Northeastern	L 69–74	3–5	Matthews Arena (912); Boston, MA
December 6, 2021*; 7:00 pm, ESPN+		Columbia	W 89–61	4–5	Cotterell Court (456); Hamilton, NY
December 9, 2021*; 8:00 pm, ACCN		at Pittsburgh; Gotham Classic	L 68–71	4–6	Petersen Events Center (7,328); Pittsburgh, PA
December 12, 2021*; 12:00 pm, FS1		at St. John's; Gotham Classic	L 64–82	4–7	Carnesecca Arena (3,510); Queens, NY
December 19, 2021*; 2:00 pm, ESPN3		at Monmouth; Gotham Classic	L 66–77	4–8	OceanFirst Bank Center; West Long Branch, NJ
December 22, 2021*; 2:00 pm, ESPN3		at Vermont	L 68–78	4–9	Patrick Gym (1964); Burlington, VT
Patriot League regular season
January 4, 2022; 7:00 pm, ESPN+		at Lehigh	W 85–81	5–9 (1–0)	Stabler Arena (563); Bethlehem, PA
January 10, 2022; 6:00 pm, ESPN+		Army	L 57–76	5–10 (1–1)	Cotterell Court (303); Hamilton, NY
January 13, 2022; 7:00 pm, ESPN+		at Navy	W 69–50	6–10 (2–1)	Alumni Hall (823); Annapolis, MD
January 16, 2022; 6:00 pm, CBSSN		Holy Cross	Postponed due to COVID-19 issues		Cotterell Court; Hamilton, NY
January 19, 2022; 7:00 pm, ESPN+		at Bucknell	W 75–56	7–10 (3–1)	Sojka Pavilion (874); Lewisburg, PA
January 22, 2022; 2:00 pm, ESPN+		Lafayette	Postponed due to COVID protocols at Lafayette		Cotterell Court; Hamilton, NY
January 24, 2022; 7:00 pm, CBSSN		Loyola (MD)	W 65–52	8–10 (4–1)	Cotterell Court (639); Hamilton, NY
January 28, 2022; 2:00 pm, ESPN+		at Boston University	L 72–76	8–11 (4–2)	Case Gym (430); Boston, MA
January 31, 2022; 6:00 pm, ESPN+		at Lafayette	W 72–61	9–11 (5–2)	Kirby Sports Center (1,291); Easton, PA
February 2, 2022; 7:00 pm, ESPN+		Bucknell	W 83–69	10–11 (6–2)	Cotterell Court (405); Hamilton, NY
February 5, 2022; 4:00 pm, ESPN+		at American	W 86–68	11–11 (7–2)	Bender Arena (1,009); Washington, D.C.
February 7, 2022; 6:00 pm, ESPN+		Holy Cross; Rescheduled from January 16	W 87–60	12–11 (8–2)	Cotterell Court (475); Hamilton, NY
February 9, 2022; 7:00 pm, ESPN+		Lehigh	W 78–62	13–11 (9–2)	Cotterell Court (510); Hamilton, NY
February 12, 2022; 2:00 pm, ESPN+		at Loyola (MD)	W 64–56	14–11 (10–2)	Reitz Arena (704); Baltimore, MD
February 14, 2022; 6:00 pm, CBSSN		Lafayette; Rescheduled from January 22	W 69–61	15–11 (11–2)	Cotterell Court (324); Hamilton, NY
February 16, 2022; 6:00 pm, ESPN+		at Army	W 100–90	16–11 (12–2)	Christl Arena (526); West Point, NY
February 19, 2022; 1:30 pm, CBSSN		Boston University	W 72–53	17–11 (13–2)	Cotterell Court (1,200); Hamilton, NY
February 21, 2022; 5:00 pm, CBSSN		American; Rescheduled from January 7	W 63–49	18–11 (14–2)	Cotterell Court (528); Hamilton, NY
February 23, 2022; 7:00 pm, ESPN+		at Holy Cross	W 78–71	19–11 (15–2)	Hart Center (692); Worcester, MA
February 26, 2022; 2:00 pm, ESPN+		Navy	W 74–69	20–11 (16–2)	Cotterell Court (781); Hamilton, NY
Patriot League tournament
March 3, 2022; 7:00 pm, ESPN+	(1)	(9) Bucknell; Quarterfinals	W 96–68	21–11	Cotterell Court (1,414); Hamilton, NY
March 6, 2022; 2:00 pm, CBSSN	(1)	(4) Lehigh; Semifinals	W 81–61	22–11	Cotterell Court (1,161); Hamilton, NY
March 9, 2022; 7:30 pm, CBSSN	(1)	(2) Navy; Championship	W 74–58	23–11	Cotterell Court (1,879); Hamilton, NY
NCAA tournament
March 18, 2022; 9:50 pm, TBS	(14 MW)	vs. (3 MW) No. 14 Wisconsin; First Round	L 60–67	23–12	Fiserv Forum (17,500); Milwaukee, WI
*Non-conference game. ^{#}Rankings from AP Poll. (#) Tournament seedings in parentheses. All times are in Eastern.
