= 2021–22 Monmouth Hawks men's basketball team =

American college basketball season

2021–22 Monmouth Hawks men's basketball
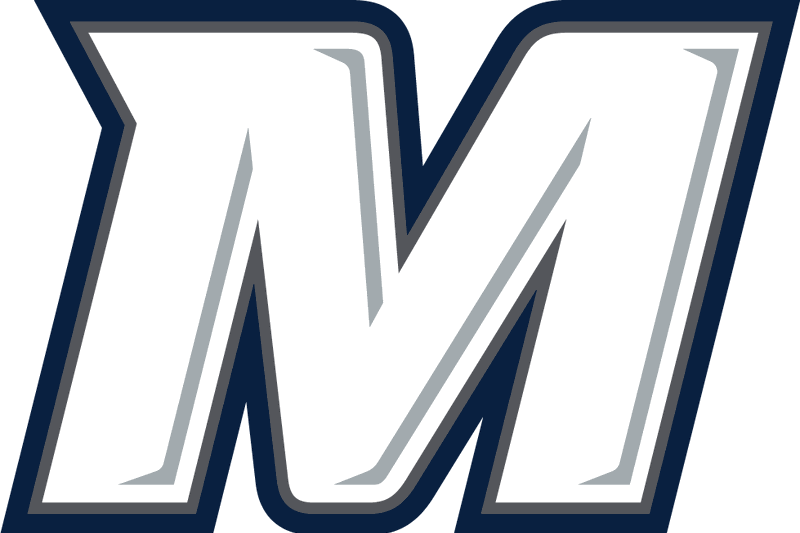
- Conference: Metro Atlantic Athletic Conference
- Record: 21–13 (11–9 MAAC)
- Head coach: King Rice (11th season)
- Assistant coaches: Rick Callahan; Jamal Meeks; JR Reid
- Home arena: OceanFirst Bank Center

2021–22 MAAC men's basketball standings
	Conf.				Overall
Team	W		L	PCT	W		L	PCT
Iona	17	–	3	.850	25	–	8	.758
Saint Peter's †	14	–	6	.700	22	–	12	.647
Siena	12	–	8	.600	15	–	14	.517
Monmouth	11	–	9	.550	21	–	13	.618
Niagara	9	–	11	.450	14	–	16	.467
Marist	9	–	11	.450	14	–	16	.467
Fairfield	8	–	12	.400	15	–	18	.455
Manhattan	8	–	12	.400	15	–	15	.500
Rider	8	–	12	.400	14	–	19	.424
Canisius	7	–	13	.350	11	–	21	.344
Quinnipiac	7	–	13	.350	14	–	17	.452
† 2022 MAAC tournament winner

The 2021–22 Monmouth Hawks men's basketball team represented Monmouth University in the 2021–22 NCAA Division I men's basketball season. The Hawks, led by 11th-year head coach King Rice, played their home games at OceanFirst Bank Center in West Long Branch, New Jersey as members of the Metro Atlantic Athletic Conference.

The 2021–22 season would be the program's last season in the MAAC, as the Hawks joined the CAA in 2022–23.

== Previous season ==
The Hawks finished the 2020–21 season 12–8, 12–6 in MAAC play to finish as MAAC regular season co-champions, alongside Siena. As the No. 2 seed in the MAAC tournament, they were upset in the quarterfinals by No. 7 seed Fairfield.

== Roster ==
2021–22 Monmouth Hawks men's basketball team
Players
Coaches

Pos.	#	Name	Height	Weight	Year	Previous school	Hometown
F	0	Myles Foster	6 ft 7 in (2.01 m)	240 lb (109 kg)	So	Brooks School	Brooklyn, NY
G	1	Jayden Doyle	6 ft 4 in (1.93 m)	190 lb (86 kg)	Fr	Freedom Christian Academy	Knoxville, TN
F	4	Walker Miller	6 ft 11 in (2.11 m)	230 lb (104 kg)	GS	North Carolina	Greensboro, NC
G	5	George Papas	6 ft 5 in (1.96 m)	185 lb (84 kg)	GS	Gould Academy	Jersey City, NJ
F	10	Jarvis Vaughan	6 ft 9 in (2.06 m)	220 lb (100 kg)	Jr	Massanutten Military Academy	Churchville, VA
G	11	Mateo Delmoral	6 ft 0 in (1.83 m)	180 lb (82 kg)	Sr	Brookdale CC	Cliffwood Beach, NJ
G	13	Marcus McClary	6 ft 3 in (1.91 m)	200 lb (91 kg)	GS	The Patrick School	Linden, NJ
G	14	Jack Holmstrom	6 ft 6 in (1.98 m)	200 lb (91 kg)	So	Guilford HS	Rockford, IL
C	15	Tadhg Crowley	6 ft 10 in (2.08 m)	240 lb (109 kg)	Fr	Trinity-Pawling School	Yonkers, NY
G	20	Tahron Allen	6 ft 4 in (1.93 m)	205 lb (93 kg)	Fr	Brooklyn Collegiate HS	Brooklyn, NY
F	21	Nikkei Rutty	6 ft 8 in (2.03 m)	235 lb (107 kg)	Sr	Trinity-Pawling School	New Rochelle, NY
G	24	Myles Ruth	6 ft 0 in (1.83 m)	160 lb (73 kg)	So	Don Bosco Preparatory High School	Hillside, NJ
G	25	Samuel Chaput	6 ft 0 in (1.83 m)	185 lb (84 kg)	Sr	St. Anthony HS	Longueuil, Quebec
G	30	Sam Fagan	6 ft 1 in (1.85 m)	170 lb (77 kg)	Fr	Neptune HS	Lake Como, NJ
G	33	Shavar Reynolds Jr.	6 ft 2 in (1.88 m)	185 lb (84 kg)	GS	Seton Hall	Lakehurst, NJ
F	35	Klemen Vuga	6 ft 9 in (2.06 m)	230 lb (104 kg)	So	Virginia Episcopal School	Mengeš, Slovenia

Head coach

- King Rice (North Carolina)

Assistant coach(es)

- Rick Callahan (Salem International)
- Jamal Meeks (Indiana)
- JR Reid (North Carolina)

Legend

- (C) Team captain
- (S) Suspended
- (I) Ineligible
- (W) Walk-on
- Injured
- Current redshirt

Roster
Last update: October 31, 2021

== Schedule and results ==
Date time, TV	Rank^{#}	Opponent^{#}	Result	Record	Site (attendance) city, state
Regular season
November 9, 2021*; 7:00 pm		at Charlotte	L 66–68	0–1	Dale F. Halton Arena (3,023); Charlotte, NC
November 13, 2021*; 7:00 pm		at Towson	W 79–71	1–1	SECU Arena (2,040); Towson, MD
November 16, 2021*; 7:00 pm, ESPN3		Lehigh	W 85–75	2–1	OceanFirst Bank Center (1,933); West Long Branch, NJ
November 20, 2021*; 12:00 pm, ESPN+		at Saint Joseph's	W 87–75	3–1	Hagan Arena (1,400); Philadelphia, PA
November 24, 2021*; 7:00 pm, ESPN3		Princeton	W 76–64	4–1	OceanFirst Bank Center (2,234); West Long Branch, NJ
November 27, 2021*; 2:00 pm, ESPN+		at Cincinnati	W 61–59	5–1	Fifth Third Arena (8,262); Cincinnati, OH
December 3, 2021; 7:00 pm, ESPN+		at Niagara	W 57–49	6–1 (1–0)	Gallagher Center (627); Lewiston, NY
December 5, 2021; 1:00 pm, ESPN3		at Canisius	W 79–65	7–1 (2–0)	Koessler Athletic Center (736); Buffalo, NY
December 9, 2021*; 8:30 pm, FS1		at St. John's; Gotham Classic campus game	L 83–88	7–2	Carnesecca Arena (3,850); Queens, NY
December 12, 2021*; 7:00 pm, ACCN		at Pittsburgh; Gotham Classic campus game	W 56–52	8–2	Petersen Events Center (7,579); Pittsburgh, PA
December 14, 2021*; 7:00 pm, ESPN+		at Yale	W 69–60	9–2	John J. Lee Amphitheater (892); New Haven, CT
December 19, 2021*; 2:00 pm, ESPN3		Colgate; Gotham Classic campus game	W 77–66	10–2	OceanFirst Bank Center (1,596); West Long Branch, NJ
December 22, 2021*; 7:00 pm, ESPN3		Hofstra	L 71–77	10–3	OceanFirst Bank Center (1,265); West Long Branch, NJ
January 14, 2022; 7:00 pm, ESPN3		at Saint Peter's	L 62–67	10–4 (2–1)	Run Baby Run Arena (483); Jersey City, NJ
January 16, 2022; 2:00 pm, ESPN3		at Marist	L 48–84	10–5 (2–2)	McCann Arena (784); Poughkeepsie, NY
January 18, 2022; 2:00 pm, ESPN3		Iona; Rescheduled from January 9	L 85–86 ^{OT}	10–6 (2–3)	OceanFirst Bank Center (1,874); West Long Branch, NJ
January 20, 2022; 7:30 pm, ESPN+		at Fairfield	W 61–58	11–6 (3–3)	Webster Bank Arena (1,492); Bridgeport, CT
January 23, 2022; 2:00 pm, ESPN3		Manhattan	W 78–62	12–6 (4–3)	OceanFirst Bank Center (1,730); West Long Branch, NJ
January 28, 2022; 7:00 pm, ESPN+		Canisius	W 72–67	13–6 (5–3)	OceanFirst Bank Center (1,558); West Long Branch, NJ
January 30, 2022; 2:00 pm, ESPN3		Niagara	L 69–70 ^{OT}	13–7 (5–4)	OceanFirst Bank Center (1,223); West Long Branch, NJ
February 4, 2022; 7:00 pm, ESPN3		Fairfield	W 59–56	14–7 (6–4)	OceanFirst Bank Center (1,572); West Long Branch, NJ
February 6, 2022; 2:00 pm, ESPN+		at Quinnipiac	W 76–63	15–7 (7–4)	People's United Center (835); Hamden, CT
February 8, 2022; 7:00 pm, ESPN3		Marist; Rescheduled from December 31	L 58–83	15–8 (7–5)	OceanFirst Bank Center (1,516); West Long Branch, NJ
February 11, 2022; 7:00 pm, ESPN3		at Manhattan	W 75–65	16–8 (8–5)	Draddy Gymnasium (734); Riverdale, NY
February 13, 2022; 1:00 pm, ESPN3		at Iona	L 62–70	16–9 (8–6)	Hynes Athletic Center (2,056); New Rochelle, NY
February 18, 2022; 7:00 pm, ESPN3		Rider	W 60–58	17–9 (9–6)	OceanFirst Bank Center (1,728); West Long Branch, NJ
February 22, 2022; 7:00 pm, ESPN3		Siena; Rescheduled from January 7	W 71–59	18–9 (10–6)	OceanFirst Bank Center (1,646); West Long Branch, NJ
February 25, 2022; 7:00 pm, ESPN3		Saint Peter's	L 65–70	18–10 (10–7)	OceanFirst Bank Center (2,027); West Long Branch, NJ
February 27, 2022; 2:00 pm, ESPN+		at Siena	W 70–59	18–11 (10–8)	MVP Arena (6,524); Albany, NY
March 3, 2022; 7:00 pm, ESPN3		Quinnipiac	W 75–72	19–11 (11–8)	OceanFirst Bank Center (1,735); West Long Branch, NJ
March 5, 2022; 4:00 pm, ESPN3		at Rider	L 65–74	19–12 (11–9)	Alumni Gymnasium (1,650); Lawrenceville, NJ
MAAC tournament
March 10, 2022; 9:30 p.m., ESPN+	(4)	vs. (5) Niagara; Quarterfinals	W 61–58	20–12	Boardwalk Hall; Atlantic City, NJ
March 11, 2022; 6:00 p.m., ESPNews / ESPN+	(4)	vs. (9) Rider; Semifinals	W 72–68	21–12	Boardwalk Hall; Atlantic City, NJ
March 12, 2022; 4:00 p.m., ESPNU	(4)	vs. (2) Saint Peter's; Championship	L 54–60	21–13	Boardwalk Hall; Atlantic City, NJ
*Non-conference game. ^{#}Rankings from AP Poll. (#) Tournament seedings in parentheses. All times are in Eastern.
