= 2021–22 Navy Midshipmen men's basketball team =

American college basketball season

2021–22 Navy Midshipmen men's basketball
- Conference: Patriot League
- Record: 21–11 (12–6 Patriot)
- Head coach: Ed DeChellis (11th season)
- Associate head coach: Emmett Davis; Jon Perry
- Assistant coaches: Drew Gibson; Adam Notteboom
- Home arena: Alumni Hall

2021–22 Patriot League men's basketball standings
	Conf.				Overall
Team	W		L	PCT	W		L	PCT
Colgate †	16	–	2	.889	23	–	12	.657
Navy	12	–	6	.667	21	–	11	.656
Boston University	11	–	7	.611	22	–	13	.629
Lehigh	10	–	8	.556	13	–	19	.406
Army	9	–	9	.500	15	–	16	.484
Loyola	8	–	10	.444	14	–	16	.467
Holy Cross	7	–	11	.389	9	–	22	.290
Lafayette	7	–	11	.389	10	–	20	.333
Bucknell	5	–	13	.278	9	–	23	.281
American	5	–	13	.278	10	–	22	.313
† 2022 Patriot League tournament winner

The 2021–22 Navy Midshipmen men's basketball team represented the United States Naval Academy in the 2021–22 NCAA Division I men's basketball season. The Midshipmen, led by 11th-year head coach Ed DeChellis, played their home games at Alumni Hall in Annapolis, Maryland as members of the Patriot League.

== Previous season ==
The Midshipmen finished the 2020–21 season 15–3, 12–1 in Patriot League play to finish as the South division champion. As the top seed in the Patriot League tournament, they were upset by #9 seed Loyola (MD) in the quarterfinals.

== Roster ==
2021–22 Navy Midshipmen men's basketball team
Players
Coaches

Pos.	#	Name	Height	Weight	Year	Previous school	Hometown
G	0	Austin Inge	6 ft 0 in (1.83 m)	190 lb (86 kg)	So	Greensboro Day School	Greensboro, NC
G	1	John Carter Jr.	6 ft 4 in (1.93 m)	195 lb (88 kg)	Sr	Summit HS	Spring Hill, TN
G	2	Lysander Rehnstrom	6 ft 4 in (1.93 m)	200 lb (91 kg)	Fr	Herndon HS	Reston, VA
G	3	Sean Yoder	6 ft 3 in (1.91 m)	200 lb (91 kg)	Jr	Pennridge HS	Dublin, PA
F	5	Tyler Nelson	6 ft 6 in (1.98 m)	215 lb (98 kg)	Jr	Metrolina Christian Academy	Monroe, NC
G	10	Christian Jones	6 ft 1 in (1.85 m)	192 lb (87 kg)	Jr	Annapolis HS	Bowie, MD
F	11	Jaylen Walker	6 ft 5 in (1.96 m)	215 lb (98 kg)	Jr	Allen HS	Allen, TX
G	14	Kam Summers	6 ft 4 in (1.93 m)	190 lb (86 kg)	Fr	First Academy	Ocoee, FL
G	15	P.J. Roach Jr.	6 ft 1 in (1.85 m)	180 lb (82 kg)	Jr	Atlantic Shores Christian	Virginia Beach, VA
G	20	Greg Summers	6 ft 4 in (1.93 m)	200 lb (91 kg)	Sr	First Academy	Ocoee, FL
G	21	Patrick Dorsey	6 ft 5 in (1.96 m)	205 lb (93 kg)	Jr	Millbrook HS	Raleigh, NC
G	22	Mac MacDonald	6 ft 1 in (1.85 m)	177 lb (80 kg)	Fr	Collegiate School	Richmond, VA
F	23	B.J. Knight	6 ft 5 in (1.96 m)	225 lb (102 kg)	So	Peachtree Ridge HS	Suwanee, GA
F	24	P.J. Fenton	6 ft 7 in (2.01 m)	212 lb (96 kg)	Jr	Green Hope HS	Cary, NC
G	25	Amir Whitlock	6 ft 3 in (1.91 m)	185 lb (84 kg)	Fr	DeLaSalle HS	Plymouth, MN
G	30	Christian Silva	6 ft 2 in (1.88 m)	190 lb (86 kg)	Sr	Archbishop Carroll HS	Miami, FL
F	31	Daniel Deaver	6 ft 8 in (2.03 m)	235 lb (107 kg)	Jr	Marshall HS	Falls Church, VA
G	32	Charles West	6 ft 3 in (1.91 m)	198 lb (90 kg)	So	Spanish River HS	Delray Beach, FL
C	33	Myles Evans	6 ft 7 in (2.01 m)	220 lb (100 kg)	Fr	Ravenscroft School	Wake Forest, NC
F	34	Mitch Fischer	6 ft 9 in (2.06 m)	215 lb (98 kg)	Fr	Loyola Blakefield	Glen Arm, MD
F	35	Nate Allison	6 ft 7 in (2.01 m)	230 lb (104 kg)	Jr	Starr's Mill HS	Fayetteville, GA
F	41	Tony Atkinson	6 ft 8 in (2.03 m)	230 lb (104 kg)	So	Westminster Academy	Palm Beach Gardens, FL
C	44	Ejai Washington	6 ft 8 in (2.03 m)	240 lb (109 kg)	So	Lanier HS	Buford, GA
C	45	Jaime Hernandez	6 ft 10 in (2.08 m)	218 lb (99 kg)	Fr	Page HS	Franklin, TN
F	55	Richard Njoku	6 ft 7 in (2.01 m)	235 lb (107 kg)	Sr	St. John's HS	Washington, D.C.

Head coach

- Ed DeChellis (Penn State)

Assistant coach(es)

- Emmett Davis (St. Lawrence)
- Jon Perry (East Tennessee State)
- Drew Gibson (Wofford)
- Adam Notteboom (Xavier)

Legend

- (C) Team captain
- (S) Suspended
- (I) Ineligible
- (W) Walk-on
- Injured
- Current redshirt

Roster
Last update: December 11, 2021

== Schedule and results ==
Date time, TV	Rank^{#}	Opponent^{#}	Result	Record	Site (attendance) city, state
Non-conference regular season
November 9, 2021*; 9:00 pm, ACCN		at No. 25 Virginia	W 66–58	1–0	John Paul Jones Arena (13,100); Charlottesville, VA
November 12, 2021*; 8:30 pm, CBSSN		Virginia Tech; Veterans Classic	L 57–77	1–1	Alumni Hall (4,784); Annapolis, MD
November 15, 2021*; 8:00 pm, ACCN		at Louisville	L 60–77	1–2	KFC Yum! Center (12,223); Louisville, KY
November 20, 2021*; 5:00 pm		vs. Radford	W 47–33	2–2	Timmons Arena (118); Greenville, SC
November 21, 2021*; 3:00 pm, ESPN+		at Furman	W 77–66	3–2	Timmons Arena (1,701); Greenville, SC
November 24, 2021*; 2:00 pm, ESPN+		Washington (MD)	W 89–40	4–2	Alumni Hall (727); Annapolis, MD
November 27, 2021*; 2:00 pm, WDVM/NEC Front Row		at Mount St. Mary's	W 67–40	5–2	Knott Arena (1,362); Emmitsburg, MD
December 1, 2021*; 7:00 pm, ESPN+		William & Mary	W 75–56	6–2	Alumni Hall (889); Annapolis, MD
December 7, 2021*; 7:00 pm, ESPN+		at George Mason	L 65–71	6–3	EagleBank Arena (2,845); Fairfax, VA
December 12, 2021*; 2:00 pm, ESPN3		at Marist	W 67–61	7–3	McCann Arena (1,350); Poughkeepsie, NY
December 22, 2021*; 1:00 pm, ESPN+		Towson	L 52–69	7–4	Alumni Hall (789); Annapolis, MD
Patriot League regular season
January 1, 2022; 2:00 pm, ESPN+		at Holy Cross	W 70–56	8–4 (1–0)	Hart Center (873); Worcester, MA
January 4, 2022; 7:00 pm, ESPN+		Boston University	W 83–71	9–4 (2–0)	Alumni Hall (657); Annapolis, MD
January 7, 2022; 7:00 pm, ESPN+		Bucknell	W 73–55	10–4 (3–0)	Alumni Hall (1,008); Annapolis, MD
January 10, 2022; 7:00 pm, ESPN+		at Lafayette	W 69–55	11–4 (4–0)	Kirby Sports Center (1,087); Easton, PA
January 13, 2022; 7:00 pm, ESPN+		Colgate	L 50–69	11–5 (4–1)	Alumni Hall (823); Annapolis, MD
January 16, 2022; 1:00 pm, ESPN+		at Boston University	W 72–65	12–5 (5–1)	Case Gym (468); Boston, MA
January 19, 2022; 7:00 pm, ESPN+		Lehigh	L 61–69	12–6 (5–2)	Alumni Hall (701); Annapolis, MD
January 22, 2022; 1:30 pm, CBSSN		Army	L 73–74 ^{OT}	12–7 (5–3)	Alumni Hall (5,168); Annapolis, MD
January 26, 2022; 7:00 pm, ESPN+		at Bucknell	W 81–63	13–7 (6–3)	Sojka Pavilion (701); Lewisburg, PA
January 29, 2022; 2:00 pm, ESPN+		American	W 47–45	14–7 (7–3)	Alumni Hall (1,112); Annapolis, MD
February 2, 2022; 7:00 pm, ESPN+		at Lehigh	L 62–63	14–8 (7–4)	Stabler Arena (1,089); Bethlehem, PA
February 5, 2022; 5:00 pm, ESPN+		at Loyola (MD)	W 56–55	15–8 (8–4)	Reitz Arena (902); Baltimore, MD
February 7, 2022; 7:00 pm, CBSSN		Lafayette	W 68–44	16–8 (9–4)	Alumni Hall (1,027); Annapolis, MD
February 12, 2022; 1:30 pm, CBSSN		at Army	W 52–49	17–8 (10–4)	Christl Arena (4,453); West Point, NY
February 16, 2022; 7:00 pm, ESPN+		at American	W 55–46	18–8 (11–4)	Bender Arena (691); Washington, D.C.
February 19, 2022; 12:00 pm, ESPN+		Holy Cross	L 50–55	18–9 (11–5)	Alumni Hall (1,512); Annapolis, MD
February 23, 2022; 7:00 pm, ESPN+		Loyola (MD)	W 52–50	19–9 (12–5)	Alumni Hall (1,016); Annapolis, MD
February 26, 2022; 2:00 pm, ESPN+		at Colgate	L 69–74	19–10 (12–6)	Cotterell Court (781); Hamilton, NY
Patriot League tournament
March 3, 2022; 7:00 pm, ESPN+	(2)	(10) American; Quarterfinals	W 71–64	20–10	Alumni Hall (1,011); Annapolis, MD
March 6, 2022; 4:00 pm, CBSSN	(2)	(3) Boston University; Semifinals	W 85–80 ^{OT}	21–10	Alumni Hall (1,179); Annapolis, MD
March 9, 2022; 7:30 pm, CBSSN	(2)	at (1) Colgate; Championship	L 58–74	21–11	Coterell Court; Hamilton, NY
*Non-conference game. ^{#}Rankings from AP Poll. (#) Tournament seedings in parentheses. All times are in Eastern.
