= 2021–22 American Eagles men's basketball team =

American college basketball season

2021–22 American Eagles men's basketball
- Conference: Patriot League
- Record: 10–22 (5–13 Patriot)
- Head coach: Mike Brennan (9th season)
- Assistant coaches: Scott Greenman; Eddie Jackson; Dallas Cameron
- Home arena: Bender Arena

2021–22 Patriot League men's basketball standings
	Conf.				Overall
Team	W		L	PCT	W		L	PCT
Colgate †	16	–	2	.889	23	–	12	.657
Navy	12	–	6	.667	21	–	11	.656
Boston University	11	–	7	.611	22	–	13	.629
Lehigh	10	–	8	.556	13	–	19	.406
Army	9	–	9	.500	15	–	16	.484
Loyola	8	–	10	.444	14	–	16	.467
Holy Cross	7	–	11	.389	9	–	22	.290
Lafayette	7	–	11	.389	10	–	20	.333
Bucknell	5	–	13	.278	9	–	23	.281
American	5	–	13	.278	10	–	22	.313
† 2022 Patriot League tournament winner

The 2021–22 American Eagles men's basketball team represented American University in the 2021–22 NCAA Division I men's basketball season. The Eagles, led by eighth-year head coach Mike Brennan, played their home games at Bender Arena in Washington, D.C. as members of the Patriot League. They finished the season 10–22, 5–13 in Patriot League play, to finish in a tie for last place. As the No. 10 seed in the Patriot League tournament, they defeated Holy Cross in the first round before losing to Navy in the quarterfinals.

== Previous season ==
In a season limited due to the ongoing COVID-19 pandemic, the Eagles finished the 2020–21 season 4–6, 4–5 in Patriot League play, to finish in second place in the South division. As the No. 5 seed in the Patriot League tournament, they lost to Army in the quarterfinals.

== Roster ==
2021–22 American Eagles men's basketball team
Players
Coaches

Pos.	#	Name	Height	Weight	Year	Previous school	Hometown
G	0	Chris Gleaton	6 ft 3 in (1.91 m)	175 lb (79 kg)	So	Trinity-Pawling School	Thiells, NY
G	1	Victor Jr. Brown	6 ft 4 in (1.93 m)	190 lb (86 kg)	So	Lake Highland Prep	Maitland, FL
G	2	Stacy Jr. Beckton	6 ft 4 in (1.93 m)	186 lb (84 kg)	Sr	Atlantic HS	Daytona Beach, FL
G	3	Colin Smalls	6 ft 2 in (1.88 m)	185 lb (84 kg)	So	St. Andrew's Episcopal School	Upper Marlboro, MD
G	4	Lincoln Ball	6 ft 6 in (1.98 m)	215 lb (98 kg)	So	George Washington	Williamsport, PA
F	5	Connor Nelson	6 ft 6 in (1.98 m)	220 lb (100 kg)	Sr	Central Wyoming College	Denver, CO
G	10	Ben Lubarsky	6 ft 5 in (1.96 m)	210 lb (95 kg)	Jr	The Benjamin School	Palm Beach, FL
F	12	Christian Lorng	6 ft 9 in (2.06 m)	260 lb (118 kg)	Sr	Chipola College	Paris, France
G	13	Marvin Bragg	6 ft 6 in (1.98 m)	195 lb (88 kg)	GS	Gahr HS	Cerritos, CA
F	14	Johnny O'Neil	6 ft 9 in (2.06 m)	200 lb (91 kg)	So	Chaminade-Madonna College Prep	Miami Shores, FL
F	15	Matt Rogers	6 ft 9 in (2.06 m)	220 lb (100 kg)	So	St. Maria Goretti HS	Knoxville, MD
G	20	Lorenzo Donadio	6 ft 4 in (1.93 m)	190 lb (86 kg)	So	Boys' Latin School of Maryland	Rome, Italy
F	21	Josh Alexander	6 ft 8 in (2.03 m)	243 lb (110 kg)	Sr	Iona Prep	Carmel, NY
G	22	Jaxon Knotek	6 ft 6 in (1.98 m)	215 lb (98 kg)	Sr	North Dakota State	River Falls, WI
G	23	Elijah Stephens	5 ft 9 in (1.75 m)	165 lb (75 kg)	Fr	China Spring HS	Waco, TX
F	25	Pierce Prendergast	6 ft 6 in (1.98 m)	195 lb (88 kg)	Fr	Loomis Chaffee School	Bayport, NY
F	31	Matt Delaney	6 ft 7 in (2.01 m)	215 lb (98 kg)	Fr	St. Augustine Prep	Mantua, NJ
G	33	Christian Sutton	6 ft 3 in (1.91 m)	193 lb (88 kg)	Sr	Riverwood HS	Atlanta, GA
F	45	Mason Whittaker	6 ft 9 in (2.06 m)	210 lb (95 kg)	Fr	Christ's College	Cust, New Zealand

Head coach

- Mike Brennan (Princeton)

Assistant coach(es)

- Scott Greenman (Princeton)
- Eddie Jackson (Ohio State)
- Dallas Cameron (Stephen F. Austin)

Legend

- (C) Team captain
- (S) Suspended
- (I) Ineligible
- (W) Walk-on
- Injured
- Current redshirt

Roster
Last update: January 11, 2022

== Schedule and results ==
Date time, TV	Rank^{#}	Opponent^{#}	Result	Record	Site (attendance) city, state
Non-conference regular season
November 9, 2021*; 8:00 p.m., ESPN+		Marist	W 77–73 ^{OT}	1–0	Bender Arena (1,370); Washington, D.C.
November 12, 2021*; 7:00 p.m., FloSports		at William & Mary	W 74–62	2–0	Kaplan Arena (2,799); Williamsburg, VA
November 16, 2021*; 8:30 p.m., FS2		at Georgetown	L 57–79	2–1	Capital One Arena (4,327); Washington, D.C.
November 19, 2021*; 5:00 p.m., ESPN+		at Longwood; Jerome Kersey Classic	L 42–82	2–2	Willett Hall (1,340); Farmville, VA
November 20, 2021*; 7:30 p.m., ESPN+		vs. Western Carolina; Jerome Kersey Classic	L 79–80	2–3	Willett Hall (218); Farmville, VA
November 23, 2021*; 7:00 p.m., ESPN3/MASN2		at UMBC; Jerome Kersey Classic	L 67–98	2–4	Chesapeake Employers Insurance Arena (2,051); Catonsville, MD
November 28, 2021*; 2:00 p.m., ESPN+		at Duquesne	L 79–88	2–5	UPMC Cooper Fieldhouse (1,583); Pittsburgh, PA
December 1, 2021*; 6:30 p.m., ESPN+		at Stony Brook	L 57–80	2–6	Island Federal Arena (1,875); Stony Brook, NY
December 4, 2021*; 5:30 p.m., HBCU Go		at Howard	L 56–90	2–7	Burr Gymnasium (612); Washington, D.C.
December 8, 2021*; 7:00 p.m., ESPN+		Saint Francis (PA)	W 83–73	3–7	Bender Arena (992); Washington, D.C.
December 11, 2021*; 4:00 p.m., WDVM/NEC Front Row		at Mount St. Mary's	W 72–66 ^{OT}	4–7	Knott Arena (1,935); Emmitsburg, MD
December 21, 2021*; 7:00 p.m., ESPN+		at George Mason	L 44–67	4–8	EagleBank Arena (3,047); Fairfax, VA
December 28, 2021*; 2:00 p.m., ESPN+		Siena	Canceled due to COVID-19 protocols		Bender Arena; Washington, D.C.
Patriot League regular season
January 1, 2022; 4:00 p.m., ESPN+		Lehigh	L 61–63	4–9 (0–1)	Bender Arena (365); Washington, D.C.
January 10, 2022; 7:00 p.m., CBSSN		Boston University	L 53–79	4–10 (0–2)	Bender Arena (435); Washington, D.C.
January 16, 2022; 2:00 p.m., ESPN+		Bucknell	W 63–55	5–10 (1–2)	Bender Arena (450); Washington, D.C.
January 19, 2022; 6:00 p.m., ESPN+		at Army	L 66–76	5–11 (1–3)	Christl Arena (508); West Point, NY
January 22, 2022; 2:00 p.m., ESPN+		at Loyola (MD)	L 73–78	5–12 (1–4)	Reitz Arena (250); Baltimore, MD
January 24, 2022; 7:00 p.m., ESPN+		Lafayette; Rescheduled from January 4	L 56–69	5–13 (1–5)	Bender Arena (427); Washington, D.C.
January 26, 2022; 7:00 p.m., ESPN+		Holy Cross	W 67–49	6–13 (2–5)	Bender Arena (515); Washington, D.C.
January 29, 2022; 2:00 p.m., ESPN+		at Navy	L 45–47	6–14 (2–6)	Alumni Hall (1,112); Annapolis, MD
February 2, 2022; 7:00 p.m., ESPN+		at Lafayette	L 62–71	6–15 (2–7)	Kirby Sports Center (1,153); Easton, PA
February 6, 2022; 6:00 p.m., CBSSN		Colgate	L 68–86	6–16 (2–8)	Bender Arena (1,009); Washington, D.C.
February 9, 2022; 7:00 p.m., ESPN+		at Bucknell	L 66–68	6–17 (2–9)	Sojka Pavilion (633); Lewisburg, PA
February 12, 2022; 1:00 p.m., ESPN+		at Boston University	L 67–85	6–18 (2–10)	Case Gym (580); Boston, MA
February 14, 2022; 7:00 p.m., ESPN+		at Holy Cross; Rescheduled from January 13	W 60–54	7–18 (3–10)	Hart Center (214); Worcester, MA
February 16, 2022; 7:00 p.m., ESPN+		Navy	L 46–55	7–19 (3–11)	Bender Arena (691); Washington, D.C.
February 19, 2022; 2:00 p.m., ESPN+		Army	W 83–67	8–19 (4–11)	Bender Arena (1,047); Washington, D.C.
February 21, 2022; 6:30 p.m., ESPN+		at Colgate; Rescheduled from January 7	L 49–63	8–20 (4–12)	Cotterell Court (528); Hamilton, NY
February 23, 2022; 7:00 p.m., ESPN+		at Lehigh	L 61–78	8–21 (4–13)	Stabler Arena (935); Bethlehem, PA
February 26, 2022; 2:00 p.m., ESPN+		Loyola (MD)	W 65–55	9–21 (5–13)	Bender Arena (1,034); Washington, D.C.
Patriot League tournament
March 1, 2022; 7:00 p.m., ESPN+	(10)	at (7) Holy Cross; First round	W 69–63	10–21	Hart Center (898); Worcester, MA
March 3, 2022; 7:00 p.m., ESPN+	(10)	at (2) Navy; Quarterfinals	L 64–71	10–22	Alumni Hall (1,011); Annapolis, MD
*Non-conference game. ^{#}Rankings from AP poll. (#) Tournament seedings in parentheses. All times are in Eastern.
