= 2021–22 Lehigh Mountain Hawks men's basketball team =

American college basketball season

2021–22 Lehigh Mountain Hawks men's basketball
- Conference: Patriot League
- Record: 13–19 (10–8 Patriot)
- Head coach: Brett Reed (15th season)
- Assistant coaches: Harry Morra; Quinn McDowell; Willie Jenkins
- Home arena: Stabler Arena

2021–22 Patriot League men's basketball standings
	Conf.				Overall
Team	W		L	PCT	W		L	PCT
Colgate †	16	–	2	.889	23	–	12	.657
Navy	12	–	6	.667	21	–	11	.656
Boston University	11	–	7	.611	22	–	13	.629
Lehigh	10	–	8	.556	13	–	19	.406
Army	9	–	9	.500	15	–	16	.484
Loyola	8	–	10	.444	14	–	16	.467
Holy Cross	7	–	11	.389	9	–	22	.290
Lafayette	7	–	11	.389	10	–	20	.333
Bucknell	5	–	13	.278	9	–	23	.281
American	5	–	13	.278	10	–	22	.313
† 2022 Patriot League tournament winner

The 2021–22 Lehigh Mountain Hawks men's basketball team represented Lehigh University in the 2021–22 NCAA Division I men's basketball season. The Mountain Hawks, led by 15th-year head coach Brett Reed, played their home games at Stabler Arena in Bethlehem, Pennsylvania as members of the Patriot League.

== Previous season ==
The Mountain Hawks finished the 2020–21 season 4–11, 4–10 in Patriot League play, to finish in third place in the Central Division. In the first round of the Patriot League tournament, they were defeated by Boston University.

== Roster ==
2021–22 Lehigh Mountain Hawks men's basketball team
Players
Coaches

Pos.	#	Name	Height	Weight	Year	Previous school	Hometown
F	0	Jakob Alamudun	6 ft 6 in (1.98 m)	225 lb (102 kg)	Jr	Marina HS	Huntington Beach, CA
F	1	Jeameril Wilson	6 ft 7 in (2.01 m)	200 lb (91 kg)	Sr	Woodstock Academy	Chicago, IL
G	2	Jake Betlow	6 ft 2 in (1.88 m)	185 lb (84 kg)	Jr	St. Benedict's	Mendham, NJ
G	4	Luke Traina	6 ft 5 in (1.96 m)	185 lb (84 kg)	So	Germantown Academy	Doylestown, PA
G	5	Evan Taylor	6 ft 6 in (1.98 m)	200 lb (91 kg)	Jr	Glenbard West HS	Glen Ellyn, IL
G	10	Jalin Sinclair	5 ft 10 in (1.78 m)	182 lb (83 kg)	So	Suffield Academy	Manhattan, NY
G	11	Marques Wilson	6 ft 4 in (1.93 m)	210 lb (95 kg)	RS Sr	Edmond North HS	Edmond, OK
G	13	Keith Jr. Higgins	6 ft 4 in (1.93 m)	180 lb (82 kg)	Fr	Chaminade Prep	West Hills, CA
G	15	Reed Fenton	6 ft 4 in (1.93 m)	165 lb (75 kg)	Jr	Greater Latrobe HS	Latrobe, PA
G	20	Jayshen Saigal	6 ft 2 in (1.88 m)	175 lb (79 kg)	So	Scarsdale HS	Scarsdale, NY
F	21	Burke Chebuhar	6 ft 8 in (2.03 m)	230 lb (104 kg)	Fr	The Walker School	Marietta, GA
G	22	Tyler Whitney-Sidney	6 ft 2 in (1.88 m)	175 lb (79 kg)	Fr	Brooks School	Somerville, MA
G	25	Ben Knostman	6 ft 5 in (1.96 m)	182 lb (83 kg)	Fr	Tippecanoe HS	Dayton, OH
F/C	35	Dominic Parolin	6 ft 8 in (2.03 m)	230 lb (104 kg)	So	Centennial Secondary School	Coquitlam, BC
C	42	JT Tan	6 ft 8 in (2.03 m)	280 lb (127 kg)	So	Rolling Hills Prep	Redondo Beach, CA
C	44	Nic Lynch	6 ft 11 in (2.11 m)	250 lb (113 kg)	Sr	Seattle Prep	Seattle, WA

Head coach

- Brett Reed (Wayne State (MI))

Assistant coach(es)

- Harry Morra (DeSales)
- Quinn McDowell (William & Mary)
- Willie Jenkins (Tennessee Tech)

Legend

- (C) Team captain
- (S) Suspended
- (I) Ineligible
- (W) Walk-on
- Injured
- Current redshirt

Roster
Last update: December 16, 2021

== Schedule and results ==
Date time, TV	Rank^{#}	Opponent^{#}	Result	Record	Site (attendance) city, state
Non-conference regular season
November 10, 2021*; 7:00 p.m.		at Rutgers	L 70–73 ^{OT}	0–1	Jersey Mike's Arena (8,000); Piscataway, NJ
November 13, 2021*; 7:00 p.m., ESPN+		NJIT	L 56–73	0–2	Stabler Arena (782); Bethlehem, PA
November 16, 2021*; 7:00 p.m., ESPN3		at Monmouth	L 75–85	0–3	OceanFirst Bank Center (1,933); West Long Branch, NJ
November 19, 2021*; 7:00 p.m.		at Merrimack	L 45–55	0–4	Lawler Arena (3,000); North Andover, MA
November 23, 2021*; 7:00 p.m., ESPN+		Columbia	W 79–72	1–4	Stabler Arena (618); Bethlehem, PA
November 26, 2021*; 7:00 p.m., ACCN		at Virginia	L 43–61	1–5	John Paul Jones Arena (12,647); Charlottesville, VA
November 28, 2021*; 7:00 p.m., ESPN+		Saint Francis (PA)	L 68–79	1–6	Stabler Arena (593); Bethlehem, PA
December 1, 2021*; 7:00 p.m., ESPN+		at Yale	L 72–82	1–7	John J. Lee Amphitheater (636); New Haven, CT
December 4, 2021*; 4:30 p.m., ESPN+		Maryland Eastern Shore	L 75–81	1–8	Stabler Arena (657); Bethlehem, PA
December 18, 2021*; 6:00 p.m., ACCN		at Syracuse	Canceled due to COVID-19		Carrier Dome; Syracuse, NY
December 21, 2021*; 7:00 p.m., ESPN+		Albany	L 52–68	1–9	Stabler Arena (602); Bethlehem, PA
December 28, 2021*; 8:30 p.m., BTN		Maryland	L 55–76	1–10	Xfinity Center (9,783); College Park, MD
December 29, 2021*; 7:00 p.m., ESPN+		Eastern	W 70–63	2–10	Stabler Arena (538); Bethlehem, PA
Patriot League regular season
January 1, 2022; 4:00 p.m., ESPN+		at American	W 63–61	3–10 (1–0)	Bender Arena (365); Washington, D.C.
January 4, 2022; 7:00 p.m., ESPN+		Colgate	W 85–81	4–10 (2–0)	Stabler Arena (563); Bethlehem, PA
January 7, 2022; 5:00 p.m., ESPN+		at Army	L 55–77	4–11 (2–1)	Christl Arena (580); West Point, NY
January 10, 2022; 7:00 p.m., ESPN+		Holy Cross	W 77–69	5–11 (3–1)	Stabler Arena (482); Bethlehem, PA
January 13, 2022; 7:00 p.m., ESPN+		at Bucknell	W 97–64	6–11 (4–1)	Sojka Pavilion (684); Lewisburg, PA
January 16, 2022; 2:00 p.m., ESPN+		Loyola (MD)	L 57–69	6–12 (4–2)	Stabler Arena (507); Bethlehem, PA
January 19, 2022; 7:00 p.m., ESPN+		at Navy	W 69–61	7–12 (5–2)	Alumni Hall (701); Annapolis, MD
January 22, 2022; 1:00 p.m., ESPN+		at Boston University	L 74–80	7–13 (5–3)	Case Gym (823); Boston, MA
January 26, 2022; 7:00 p.m., ESPN+		Army	W 84–71	8–13 (6–3)	Stabler Arena (744); Bethlehem, PA
January 28, 2022; 5:00 p.m., ESPN+		at Holy Cross	L 65–67	8–14 (6–4)	Hart Center (188); Worcester, MA
February 2, 2022; 7:00 p.m., ESPN+		Navy	W 63–62	9–14 (7–4)	Stabler Arena (1,089); Bethlehem, PA
February 5, 2022; 2:00 p.m., SEN/ESPN+		Boston University	L 74–80	9–15 (7–5)	Stabler Arena (810); Bethlehem, PA
February 9, 2022; 7:00 p.m., ESPN+		at Colgate	L 62–78	9–16 (7–6)	Cotterell Court (510); Hamilton, NY
February 12, 2022; 7:00 p.m., ESPN+		Lafayette	L 69–73	9–17 (7–7)	Stabler Arena (1,224); Bethlehem, PA
February 14, 2022; 7:00 p.m., CBSSN		Bucknell	W 86–77	10–17 (8–7)	Stabler Arena (659); Bethlehem, PA
February 20, 2022; 5:00 p.m., ESPN+		at Loyola (MD)	L 42–69	10–18 (8–8)	Reitz Arena (1,212); Baltimore, MD
February 23, 2022; 7:00 p.m., ESPN+		American	W 78–61	11–18 (9–8)	Stabler Arena (935); Bethlehem, PA
February 26, 2022; 2:00 p.m., ESPN+		at Lafayette	W 78–58	12–18 (10–8)	Kirby Sports Center (2,327); Easton, PA
Patriot League tournament
March 3, 2022; 7:00 p.m., ESPN+	(4)	(5) Army; Quarterfinals	W 91–77	13–18	Stabler Arena (1,732); Bethlehem, PA
March 6, 2022; 2:00 p.m., CBSSN	(4)	at (1) Colgate; Semifinals	L 61–81	13–19	Cotterell Court (1,161); Hamilton, NY
*Non-conference game. ^{#}Rankings from AP poll. (#) Tournament seedings in parentheses. All times are in Eastern.
