= 2021–22 Boston University Terriers men's basketball team =

American college basketball season

2021–22 Boston University Terriers men's basketball

CBI, Quarterfinals
- Conference: Patriot League
- Record: 22–13 (11–7 Patriot)
- Head coach: Joe Jones (11th season)
- Assistant coaches: Curtis Wilson; Walt Corbean; Mike Quinn
- Home arena: Case Gym

2021–22 Patriot League men's basketball standings
	Conf.				Overall
Team	W		L	PCT	W		L	PCT
Colgate †	16	–	2	.889	23	–	12	.657
Navy	12	–	6	.667	21	–	11	.656
Boston University	11	–	7	.611	22	–	13	.629
Lehigh	10	–	8	.556	13	–	19	.406
Army	9	–	9	.500	15	–	16	.484
Loyola	8	–	10	.444	14	–	16	.467
Holy Cross	7	–	11	.389	9	–	22	.290
Lafayette	7	–	11	.389	10	–	20	.333
Bucknell	5	–	13	.278	9	–	23	.281
American	5	–	13	.278	10	–	22	.313
† 2022 Patriot League tournament winner

The 2021–22 Boston University Terriers men's basketball team represented Boston University in the 2021–22 NCAA Division I men's basketball season. The Terriers, led by 11th-year head coach Joe Jones, played their home games at Case Gym in Boston, Massachusetts as members of the Patriot League.

== Previous season ==
In a season limited due to the ongoing COVID-19 pandemic, the Terriers finished the 2020–21 season 7–11, 6–10 in Patriot League play to finish in third place in the North Division. In the Patriot League tournament, they defeated Lehigh in the first round before falling to eventual tournament champions Colgate in the quarterfinals.

== Roster ==
2021–22 Boston University Terriers men's basketball team
Players
Coaches

Pos.	#	Name	Height	Weight	Year	Previous school	Hometown
G	0	Ethan Brittain-Watts	6 ft 2 in (1.88 m)	180 lb (82 kg)	Jr	Culver Academies	Indianapolis, IN
G	1	Garrett Pascoe	6 ft 3 in (1.91 m)	180 lb (82 kg)	Jr	Clayton Valley Charter	Concord, CA
G	2	Caelan Jones	6 ft 5 in (1.96 m)	190 lb (86 kg)	So	Vermont Academy	Los Angeles, CA
F	3	Malcolm Chimezie	6 ft 8 in (2.03 m)	220 lb (100 kg)	Fr	Stepinac	Yonkers, NY
G/F	5	Walter Whyte	6 ft 6 in (1.98 m)	210 lb (95 kg)	Sr	St. Luke's School	New Haven, CT
G	13	Daman Tate	6 ft 5 in (1.96 m)	190 lb (86 kg)	So	Cushing Academy	Roxbury, MA
G	15	Jonas Harper	6 ft 2 in (1.88 m)	190 lb (86 kg)	Sr	St. Luke's School	Stamford, CT
G	20	Tarkan Taboglu (W)	6 ft 2 in (1.88 m)	185 lb (84 kg)	Jr	Torrey Pines	San Diego, CA
F	21	Andrew Patnode	6 ft 8 in (2.03 m)	230 lb (104 kg)	So	Perkiomen School	Saratoga Springs, NY
G/F	22	Anthony Morales	6 ft 8 in (2.03 m)	195 lb (88 kg)	So	Beaver Country Day School	Boston, MA
G	24	Miles Brewster	6 ft 3 in (1.91 m)	175 lb (79 kg)	So	The Hotchkiss School	Brooklyn, NY
F	25	Nevin Zink	6 ft 9 in (2.06 m)	230 lb (104 kg)	Jr	St. Andrew's School	Newtown, CT
G	30	Javante McCoy	6 ft 5 in (1.96 m)	180 lb (82 kg)	GS	Phillips Exeter Academy	Milwaukee, WI
G	31	Michael Quinn (W)	6 ft 0 in (1.83 m)	180 lb (82 kg)	Jr	Taunton	Taunton, MA
F	34	Tim Uzoegbu (W)	6 ft 4 in (1.93 m)	185 lb (84 kg)	Jr	Medway	Medway, MA
G/F	35	Fletcher Tynen	6 ft 7 in (2.01 m)	195 lb (88 kg)	Sr	Bishop Montgomery	Torrance, CA
F	41	Sukhmail Mathon	6 ft 10 in (2.08 m)	225 lb (102 kg)	GS	Holderness School	Shavertown, PA

Head coach

- Joe Jones (SUNY–Oswego)

Assistant coach(es)

- Curtis Wilson (Adelphi)
- Walt Corbean (Northern Kentucky)
- Mike Quinn (Bentley)

Legend

- (C) Team captain
- (S) Suspended
- (I) Ineligible
- (W) Walk-on
- Injured
- Current redshirt

Roster
Last update: November 27, 2021

== Schedule and results ==
Date time, TV	Rank^{#}	Opponent^{#}	Result	Record	Site (attendance) city, state
Non-conference regular season
November 9, 2021*; 7:00 pm		at Rhode Island	L 62–71	0–1	Ryan Center (5,133); Kingston, RI
November 12, 2021*; 5:00 pm, ESPN+		Gordon College	W 85–61	1–1	Case Gym (990); Boston, MA
November 16, 2021*; 7:00 pm, NESN		at Northeastern	L 48–49	1–2	Matthews Arena (1,699); Boston, MA
November 18, 2021*; 7:00 pm, ESPN3		at Hartford	W 75–70	2–2	Chase Arena (1,208); West Hartford, CT
November 21, 2021*; 12:00 pm		vs. Northern Illinois; Jacksonville Classic Jax Semifinals	W 76–58	3–2	UNF Arena (450); Jacksonville, FL
November 22, 2021*; 1:30 pm		vs. Sam Houston State; Jacksonville Classic Jax Championship	W 72–59	4–2	UNF Arena (330); Jacksonville, FL
November 24, 2021*; 7:00 pm, ACCN		at Florida State; Jacksonville Classic campus game	L 80–81 ^{OT}	4–3	Donald L. Tucker Center (6,670); Tallahassee, FL
November 28, 2021*; 1:00 pm, ESPN+		Merrimack	W 61–60	5–3	Case Gym (548); Boston, MA
December 1, 2021*; 7:00 pm, ESPN+		at George Washington	W 56–54	6–3	Charles E. Smith Center (1,617); Washington, D.C.
December 4, 2021*; 1:00 pm, ESPN+		Binghamton	W 68–63	7–3	Case Gym (731); Boston, MA
December 8, 2021*; 7:00 pm, ESPN+		UMass Lowell	W 72–62	8–3	Case Gym (914); Boston, MA
December 11, 2021*; 6:30 pm, NESN/ESPN+		at Dartmouth	W 65–62	9–3	Leede Arena (501); Hanover, NH
December 18, 2021*; 5:00 pm, ESPN+		Marist	L 79–84 ^{OT}	9–4	Case Gym (483); Boston, MA
Patriot League regular season
January 1, 2022; 1:00 pm, ESPN+		Bucknell	W 63–61	10–4 (1–0)	Case Gym (414); Boston, MA
January 4, 2022; 7:00 pm, ESPN+		at Navy	L 71–83	10–5 (1–1)	Alumni Hall (657); Annapolis, MD
January 7, 2022; 5:00 pm, ESPN+		Loyola (MD)	L 58–66	10–6 (1–2)	Case Gym (365); Boston, MA
January 10, 2022; 7:00 pm, CBSSN		at American	W 79–53	11–6 (2–2)	Bender Arena (435); Washington, D.C.
January 13, 2022; 6:00 pm, ESPN+		at Army	L 63–73	11–7 (2–3)	Christl Arena (645); West Point, NY
January 16, 2022; 1:00 pm, ESPN+		Navy	L 65–72	11–8 (2–4)	Case Gym (468); Boston, MA
January 19, 2022; 7:00 pm, ESPN+		at Loyola (MD)	W 67–50	12–8 (3–4)	Reitz Arena (250); Baltimore, MD
January 22, 2022; 1:00 pm, ESPN+		Lehigh	W 80–74	13–8 (4–4)	Case Gym (823); Boston, MA
January 26, 2022; 7:00 pm, ESPN+		at Lafayette	W 81–62	14–8 (5–4)	Kirby Sports Center (1,427); Easton, PA
January 28, 2022; 2:00 pm, ESPN+		Colgate	W 76–72	15–8 (6–4)	Case Gym (430); Boston, MA
January 31, 2022; 7:00 pm, CBSSN		Holy Cross; Turnpike Trophy	L 70–75	15–9 (6–5)	Case Gym (660); Boston, MA
February 5, 2022; 2:00 pm, ESPN+		at Lehigh	W 80–74	16–9 (7–5)	Stabler Arena (810); Bethlehem, PA
February 9, 2022; 7:00 pm, ESPN+		Army	W 75–74	17–9 (8–5)	Case Gym (500); Boston, MA
February 12, 2022; 1:00 pm, ESPN+		American	W 85–67	18–9 (9–5)	Case Gym (580); Boston, MA
February 16, 2022; 7:00 pm, ESPN+		at Holy Cross; Turnpike Trophy	W 78–65	19–9 (10–5)	Hart Center (1,782); Worcester, MA
February 19, 2022; 1:30 pm, CBSSN		at Colgate	L 53–72	19–10 (10–6)	Cotterell Court (1,200); Hamilton, NY
February 23, 2022; 7:00 pm, ESPN+		Lafayette	W 76–60	20–10 (11–6)	Case Gym (850); Boston, MA
February 26, 2022; 2:00 pm, ESPN+		at Bucknell	L 78–89	20–11 (11–7)	Sojka Pavilion (1,031); Lewisburg, PA
Patriot League tournament
March 3, 2022; 7:00 pm, ESPN+	(3)	(6) Loyola (MD); Quarterfinals	W 76–64	21–11	Case Gym (652); Boston, MA
March 6, 2022; 4:00 pm, CBSSN	(3)	at (2) Navy; Semifinals	L 80–85 ^{OT}	21–12	Alumni Hall (1,179); Annapolis, MD
CBI
March 20, 2022; 6:00 pm, FloHoops	(10)	vs. (7) UNC Greensboro; First round	W 71–68	22–12	Ocean Center (762); Daytona Beach, FL
March 21, 2022; 6:00 pm, FloHoops	(10)	vs. (2) Middle Tennessee; Quarterfinals	L 46–76	22–13	Ocean Center (706); Daytona Beach, FL
*Non-conference game. ^{#}Rankings from AP Poll. (#) Tournament seedings in parentheses. All times are in Eastern.
