= 2021–22 Lafayette Leopards men's basketball team =

American college basketball season

2021–22 Lafayette Leopards men's basketball
- Conference: Patriot League
- Record: 10–20 (7–11 Patriot)
- Head coach: Fran O'Hanlon (27th season)
- Assistant coaches: Jarren Dyson; Andrew Radomicki; Mark Hueber
- Home arena: Kirby Sports Center

2021–22 Patriot League men's basketball standings
| | Conf. | | | | Overall |
| Team | W | | L | PCT | W | | L | PCT |
|---|---|---|---|---|---|---|---|---|
| Colgate † | 16 | – | 2 | .889 | 23 | – | 12 | .657 |
| Navy | 12 | – | 6 | .667 | 21 | – | 11 | .656 |
| Boston University | 11 | – | 7 | .611 | 22 | – | 13 | .629 |
| Lehigh | 10 | – | 8 | .556 | 13 | – | 19 | .406 |
| Army | 9 | – | 9 | .500 | 15 | – | 16 | .484 |
| Loyola | 8 | – | 10 | .444 | 14 | – | 16 | .467 |
| Holy Cross | 7 | – | 11 | .389 | 9 | – | 22 | .290 |
| Lafayette | 7 | – | 11 | .389 | 10 | – | 20 | .333 |
| Bucknell | 5 | – | 13 | .278 | 9 | – | 23 | .281 |
| American | 5 | – | 13 | .278 | 10 | – | 22 | .313 |
† 2022 Patriot League tournament winner

The 2021–22 Lafayette Leopards men's basketball team represented Lafayette College in the 2021–22 NCAA Division I men's basketball season. The Leopards, led by 27th-year head coach Fran O'Hanlon, played their home games at the Kirby Sports Center in Easton, Pennsylvania as members of the Patriot League.

The Leopards finished the season 10–20, 7–11 in Patriot League play, to finish in a tie for seventh place. In the Patriot League tournament, they were defeated in overtime by Bucknell in the first round. During the season, on January 21, longtime head coach Fran O'Hanlon announced that he would retire at the end of the season, ending his 27-year run as the head coach. On March 29, Colgate assistant Mike Jordan was named as O'Hanlon's successor.

== Previous season ==
In a season limited due to the ongoing COVID-19 pandemic, the Leopards finished the 2020–21 season 9–6, 9–5 in Patriot League play, to finish in first place in the Central Division. As the No. 3 seed in the Patriot League tournament, they were upset by Bucknell in the quarterfinals.

== Roster ==
2021–22 Lafayette Leopards men's basketball team
Players
Coaches

| Pos. | # | Name | Height | Weight | Year | Hometown |
|---|---|---|---|---|---|---|
| G | 1 | Ryan Zambie | 6 ft 3 in (1.91 m) | 195 lb (88 kg) | So | Plano, TX |
| G | 2 | Jon Brantley | 6 ft 3 in (1.91 m) | 185 lb (84 kg) | So | Farmington Hills, MI |
| G | 3 | Tyrone Perry | 6 ft 2 in (1.88 m) | 170 lb (77 kg) | Sr | Apopka, FL |
| G | 4 | Jay Vaughan | 6 ft 0 in (1.83 m) | 170 lb (77 kg) | Sr | Allentown, PA |
| G | 5 | Eric Sondberg | 6 ft 7 in (2.01 m) | 200 lb (91 kg) | So | Davidsonville, MD |
| G | 11 | Isaiah Thompson | 6 ft 0 in (1.83 m) | 175 lb (79 kg) | Fr | White Plains, NY |
| F | 12 | Tomas Verbinskis | 6 ft 8 in (2.03 m) | 220 lb (100 kg) | Sr | Klaipėda, Lithuania |
| F | 14 | Kyle Jenkins | 6 ft 7 in (2.01 m) | 220 lb (100 kg) | So | Higganum, CT |
| G | 20 | CJ Fulton | 6 ft 2 in (1.88 m) | 185 lb (84 kg) | Fr | Belfast, Northern Ireland |
| G | 21 | Devin Hines | 6 ft 4 in (1.93 m) | 170 lb (77 kg) | Fr | West Palm Beach, FL |
| F | 33 | Leo O'Boyle | 6 ft 7 in (2.01 m) | 210 lb (95 kg) | Jr | Scranton, PA |
| F | 44 | Chris Rubayo | 6 ft 10 in (2.08 m) | 210 lb (95 kg) | Fr | Skillman, NJ |
| F | 45 | Neal Quinn | 7 ft 0 in (2.13 m) | 260 lb (118 kg) | Jr | Allendale, NJ |

Head coach

- Fran O'Hanlon (Villanova)

Assistant coach(es)

- Jarren Dyson (Emory & Henry)
- Andrew Radomicki (Widener)
- Mark Hueber (Immaculata)

Legend

- (C) Team captain
- (S) Suspended
- (I) Ineligible
- (W) Walk-on
- Injured
- Current redshirt

Roster
Last update: December 20, 2021

== Schedule and results ==
| Date time, TV | Rank^{#} | Opponent^{#} | Result | Record | Site (attendance) city, state |
Non-conference regular season
| November 9, 2021*; 7:00 p.m., ACCNX | | at Syracuse | L 63–97 | 0–1 | Carrier Dome (19,929); Syracuse, NY |
| November 12, 2021*; 7:30 p.m., ESPN+ | | Cornell | L 85–90 | 0–2 | Kirby Sports Center (1,309); Easton, PA |
| November 16, 2021*; 7:00 p.m., ESPN+ | | at Penn | L 57–85 | 0–3 | The Palestra (1,791); Philadelphia, PA |
| November 19, 2021*; 8:00 p.m., ACCN | | at No. 7 Duke | L 55–88 | 0–4 | Cameron Indoor Stadium (9,314); Durham, NC |
| November 22, 2021*; 7:00 p.m., BTN+ | | at Rutgers | W 53–51 | 1–4 | Jersey Mike's Arena (8,017); Piscataway, NJ |
| November 29, 2021*; 7:00 p.m., ESPN+ | | at Columbia | W 73–50 | 2–4 | Levien Gymnasium (628); New York, NY |
| December 2, 2021*; 7:00 p.m., ESPN+ | | Sacred Heart | L 67–74 | 2–5 | Kirby Sports Center (1,505); Easton, PA |
| December 5, 2021*; 2:00 p.m., ESPN+ | | NJIT | L 86–90 ^{2OT} | 2–6 | Kirby Sports Center (1,202); Easton, PA |
| December 5, 2021*; 7:00 p.m., FloSports | | at Delaware | L 58–68 | 2–7 | Bob Carpenter Center (1,636); Newark, DE |
| December 11, 2021*; 5:00 p.m., ESPN+ | | Princeton | L 73–84 | 2–8 | Kirby Sports Center (1,345); Easton, PA |
| December 22, 2021*; 7:00 p.m., ESPN+ | | Gwynedd Mercy | W 87–66 | 3–8 | Kirby Sports Center (978); Easton, PA |
Patriot League regular season
| January 7, 2022; 7:00 p.m., ESPN+ | | at Holy Cross | L 74–79 | 3–9 (0–1) | Hart Center (0); Worcester, MA |
| January 10, 2022; 7:00 p.m. | | Navy | L 55–69 | 3–10 (0–2) | Kirby Sports Center (1,087); Easton, PA |
| January 13, 2022; 7:00 p.m., ESPN+ | | at Loyola (MD) | L 60–74 | 3–11 (0–3) | Reitz Arena (250); Baltimore, MD |
| January 16, 2022; 2:00 p.m., ESPN+ | | Army | W 68–54 | 4–11 (1–3) | Kirby Sports Center (1,357); Easton, PA |
| January 24, 2022; 7:00 p.m., ESPN+ | | at American | W 69–56 | 5–11 (2–3) | Bender Arena (427); Washington, D.C. |
| January 26, 2022; 7:00 p.m., ESPN+ | | Boston University | L 62–81 | 5–12 (2–4) | Kirby Sports Center (1,427); Easton, PA |
| January 29, 2022; 1:00 p.m., ESPN+ | | at Army | L 56–60 | 5–13 (2–5) | Christl Arena (735); West Point, NY |
| January 31, 2022; 6:00 p.m., ESPN+ | | Colgate | L 61–72 | 5–14 (2–6) | Kirby Sports Center (1,291); Easton, PA |
| February 2, 2022; 7:00 p.m. | | American | W 71–62 | 5–14 (3–6) | Kirby Sports Center (1,153); Easton, PA |
| February 5, 2022; 2:00 p.m. | | Bucknell | W 74–72 ^{OT} | 7–14 (4–6) | Kirby Sports Center (1,667); Easton, PA |
| February 7, 2022; 7:00 p.m., CBSSN | | at Navy | L 44–68 | 7–15 (4–7) | Alumni Hall (1,027); Annapolis, MD |
| February 12, 2022; 12:00 p.m., ESPN+ | | at Lehigh | W 73–69 | 8–15 (5–7) | Stabler Arena (1,224); Bethlehem, PA |
| February 14, 2022; 6:00 p.m., ESPN+ | | at Colgate; Rescheduled from January 22 | L 61–69 | 8–16 (5–8) | Cotterell Court (324); Hamilton, NY |
| February 16, 2022; 7:00 p.m., ESPN+ | | Loyola (MD) | W 77–68 | 9–16 (6–8) | Kirby Sports Center (1,473); Easton, PA |
| February 19, 2022; 4:00 p.m., ESPN+ | | at Bucknell | L 89–92 ^{OT} | 9–17 (6–9) | Sojka Pavilion (883); Lewisburg, PA |
| February 21, 2022; 7:00 p.m., ESPN+ | | Holy Cross; Rescheduled from January 29 | W 84–61 | 10–17 (7–9) | Kirby Sports Center (1,541); Easton, PA |
| February 23, 2022; 7:00 p.m., ESPN+ | | at Boston University | L 60–76 | 10–18 (7–10) | Case Gym (850); Boston, MA |
| February 26, 2022; 2:00 p.m. | | Lehigh | L 58–78 | 10–19 (7–11) | Kirby Sports Center (2,327); Easton, PA |
Patriot League tournament
| March 1, 2022; 7:00 p.m., ESPN+ | (8) | (9) Bucknell; First round | L 81–82 ^{OT} | 10–20 | Kirby Sports Center (1,740); Easton, PA |
*Non-conference game. ^{#}Rankings from AP poll. (#) Tournament seedings in parentheses. All times are in Eastern.
