= 2021–22 Holy Cross Crusaders men's basketball team =

American college basketball season

2021–22 Holy Cross Crusaders men's basketball
- Conference: Patriot League
- Record: 9–22 (7–11 Patriot)
- Head coach: Brett Nelson (3rd season)
- Assistant coaches: R.J. Evans; Sam Ferry; Joe Kennedy
- Home arena: Hart Center

2021–22 Patriot League men's basketball standings
	Conf.				Overall
Team	W		L	PCT	W		L	PCT
Colgate †	16	–	2	.889	23	–	12	.657
Navy	12	–	6	.667	21	–	11	.656
Boston University	11	–	7	.611	22	–	13	.629
Lehigh	10	–	8	.556	13	–	19	.406
Army	9	–	9	.500	15	–	16	.484
Loyola	8	–	10	.444	14	–	16	.467
Holy Cross	7	–	11	.389	9	–	22	.290
Lafayette	7	–	11	.389	10	–	20	.333
Bucknell	5	–	13	.278	9	–	23	.281
American	5	–	13	.278	10	–	22	.313
† 2022 Patriot League tournament winner

The 2021–22 Holy Cross Crusaders men's basketball team represented the College of the Holy Cross in the 2021–22 NCAA Division I men's basketball season. The Crusaders, led by third-year head coach Brett Nelson, played their home games at the Hart Center in Worcester, Massachusetts as members of the Patriot League.

== Previous season ==
In a season limited due to the ongoing COVID-19 pandemic, the Crusaders finished the 2020–21 season 5–11 in Patriot League play before suspending their season after positive COVID-19 tests within the program. They did not participate in the Patriot League tournament.

== Roster ==
2021–22 Holy Cross Crusaders men's basketball team
Players
Coaches

Pos.	#	Name	Height	Weight	Year	Previous school	Hometown
G	0	Bo Montgomery	6 ft 5 in (1.96 m)	193 lb (88 kg)	So	Lausanne Collegiate	Memphis, Tennessee
G	1	R.J. Johnson	6 ft 1 in (1.85 m)	184 lb (83 kg)	So	Charlotte Latin School	Matthews, North Carolina
G	3	DáJion Humphrey	6 ft 4 in (1.93 m)	185 lb (84 kg)	So	Southfield Christian School	Detroit, Michigan
G	4	Kyrell Luc	5 ft 11 in (1.8 m)	164 lb (74 kg)	Fr	Brimmer & May	Dorchester, Massachusetts
F	10	Gerrale Gates	6 ft 6 in (1.98 m)	242 lb (110 kg)	Sr	David W. Butler High School	Charlotte, North Carolina
G	12	Malcolm Townsel	6 ft 5 in (1.96 m)	207 lb (94 kg)	Sr	State Fair Community College	Chicago, Illinois
G	20	Tomer Oron	6 ft 3 in (1.91 m)	170 lb (77 kg)	Fr	HSMSE	New York, New York
G	21	Nolan Dorsey	6 ft 5 in (1.96 m)	206 lb (93 kg)	So	Millbrook High School	Knightdale, North Carolina
F	22	Austin Lewis	6 ft 11 in (2.11 m)	190 lb (86 kg)	Fr	Bosco Institute (IN)	Frisco, Texas
F	24	D.J. Hart	6 ft 5 in (1.96 m)	205 lb (93 kg)	Sr	St. Benedict's Prep	Newark, New Jersey
F	32	Michael Rabinovich	6 ft 10 in (2.08 m)	224 lb (102 kg)	So	Worcester Academy	Hopkinton, Massachusetts
G/F	33	Judson Martindale	6 ft 7 in (2.01 m)	210 lb (95 kg)	So	Worcester Academy	Sudbury, Massachusetts
G/F	35	Caleb Kenney	6 ft 6 in (1.98 m)	222 lb (101 kg)	Fr	Douglas S. Freeman High School	Richmond, Virginia
F	44	Louth-M Coulibaly	6 ft 9 in (2.06 m)	248 lb (112 kg)	So	Canada Topflight Academy	Ottawa, Ontario

Head coach

- Brett Nelson (Florida)

Assistant coach(es)

- R.J. Evans (Connecticut)
- Sam Ferry (Vanderbilt)
- Joe Kennedy (Northwestern)

Legend

- (C) Team captain
- (S) Suspended
- (I) Ineligible
- (W) Walk-on
- Injured
- Current redshirt

Roster
Last update: November 26, 2021

== Schedule and results ==
Date time, TV	Rank^{#}	Opponent^{#}	Result	Record	Site (attendance) city, state
Non-conference regular season
November 9, 2021*; 7:00 pm, ESPN+		Regis	W 98–51	1–0	Hart Center (1,257); Worcester, MA
November 12, 2021*; 7:00 pm, ESPN+		at Boston College; Sunshine Slam	L 55–85	1–1	Conte Forum (4,463); Chestnut Hill, MA
November 15, 2021*; 7:00 pm, ESPN3		at Quinnipiac	L 68–76	1–2	People's United Center (985); Hamden, CT
November 20, 2021*; 2:30 pm		vs. Air Force; Sunshine Slam	L 53–72	1–3	Ocean Center (1,357); Daytona Beach, FL
November 21, 2021*; 12:00 pm		vs. Bryant; Sunshine Slam	L 62–78	1–4	Ocean Center (1,264); Daytona Beach, FL
November 24, 2021*; 1:00 pm, ESPN+		Mount Saint Vincent	W 95–52	2–4	Hart Center (781); Worcester, MA
November 27, 2021*; 5:00 pm		New Hampshire	L 55–70	2–5	Hart Center (923); Worcester, MA
December 1, 2021*; 7:00 pm		at Central Connecticut	L 67–73	2–6	William H. Detrick Gymnasium (1,653); New Britain, CT
December 4, 2021*; 2:00 pm, ESPN+		at La Salle	L 65–84	2–7	Tom Gola Arena (1,326); Philadelphia, PA
December 8, 2021*; 7:00 pm, ESPN3		at Fairfield	L 59–74	2–8	Webster Bank Arena (1,275); Bridgeport, CT
December 11, 2021*; 2:00 pm		Siena	L 59–72	2–9	Hart Center; Worcester, MA
December 19, 2021; 2:00 pm, ESPN+		at Harvard	L 54–62	2–10	Lavietes Pavilion (1,191); Boston, MA
December 22, 2021*; 6:00 pm, ESPN+		at Saint Joseph’s	Canceled due to COVID-19		Hagan Arena; Philadelphia, PA
Patriot League regular season
January 1, 2022; 2:00 pm		Navy	L 56–70	2–11 (0–1)	Hart Center (873); Worcester, MA
January 4, 2022; 7:00 pm		at Loyola (MD)	L 70–79	2–12 (0–2)	Reitz Arena (250); Baltimore, MD
January 7, 2022; 7:00 pm		Lafayette	W 79–74	3–12 (1–2)	Hart Center; Worcester, MA
January 10, 2022; 7:00 pm		at Lehigh	L 69–77	3–13 (1–3)	Stabler Arena (482); Bethlehem, PA
January 22, 2022; 2:00 pm, NBCSB		Bucknell	L 65–68	3–14 (1–4)	Hart Center (191); Worcester, MA
January 26, 2022; 7:00 pm		at American	L 49–67	3–15 (1–5)	Bender Arena (515); Washington, D.C.
January 29, 2022; 2:00 pm, ESPN+		Lehigh	W 67–65	4–15 (2–5)	Hart Center; Worcester, MA
January 31, 2022; 7:00 pm, CBSSN		at Boston University; Turnpike Trophy	W 75–70	5–15 (3–5)	Case Gym (660); Boston, MA
February 5, 2022; 1:00 pm, ESPN+		at Army	W 69–65	6–15 (4–5)	Christl Arena (751); West Point, NY
February 7, 2022; 6:00 pm		at Colgate; Rescheduled from January 16	L 60–87	6–16 (4–6)	Cotterell Court (475); Hamilton, NY
February 9, 2022; 7:00 pm, ESPN+		Loyola (MD)	W 68–64	7–16 (5–6)	Hart Center (584); Worcester, MA
February 12, 2022; 2:00 pm		at Bucknell	W 78–72	8–16 (6–6)	Sojka Pavilion (947); Lewisburg, PA
February 14, 2022; 7:00 pm		American; Rescheduled from January 13	L 54–60	8–17 (6–7)	Hart Center (214); Worcester, MA
February 16, 2022; 7:00 pm, ESPN+		Boston University	L 65–78	8–18 (6–8)	Hart Center (1,782); Worcester, MA
February 19, 2022; 12:00 pm		at Navy	W 55–50	9–18 (7–8)	Alumni Hall (1,512); Annapolis, MD
February 21, 2022; 7:00 pm, ESPN+		at Lafayette; Rescheduled from January 19	L 61–84	9–19 (7–9)	Kirby Sports Center (1,541); Easton, PA
February 23, 2022; 7:00 pm, ESPN+		Colgate	L 71–78	9–20 (7–10)	Hart Center (692); Worcester, MA
February 26, 2022; 2:00 pm, ESPN+		Army	L 58–66	9–21 (7–11)	Hart Center (1,684); Worcester, MA
Patriot League Tournament
March 1, 2022; 7:00 pm, ESPN+	(7)	(10) American; First round	L 63–69	9–22	Hart Center (898); Worcester, MA
*Non-conference game. ^{#}Rankings from AP Poll. (#) Tournament seedings in parentheses. All times are in Eastern Time.
