= 2021–22 Bucknell Bison men's basketball team =

American college basketball season

2021–22 Bucknell Bison men's basketball
- Conference: Patriot League
- Record: 9–23 (5–13 Patriot)
- Head coach: Nathan Davis (7th season)
- Associate head coach: Paul Harrison
- Assistant coaches: Joe Meehan; Johnathan Brown
- Home arena: Sojka Pavilion

2021–22 Patriot League men's basketball standings
| | Conf. | | | | Overall |
| Team | W | | L | PCT | W | | L | PCT |
|---|---|---|---|---|---|---|---|---|
| Colgate † | 16 | – | 2 | .889 | 23 | – | 12 | .657 |
| Navy | 12 | – | 6 | .667 | 21 | – | 11 | .656 |
| Boston University | 11 | – | 7 | .611 | 22 | – | 13 | .629 |
| Lehigh | 10 | – | 8 | .556 | 13 | – | 19 | .406 |
| Army | 9 | – | 9 | .500 | 15 | – | 16 | .484 |
| Loyola | 8 | – | 10 | .444 | 14 | – | 16 | .467 |
| Holy Cross | 7 | – | 11 | .389 | 9 | – | 22 | .290 |
| Lafayette | 7 | – | 11 | .389 | 10 | – | 20 | .333 |
| Bucknell | 5 | – | 13 | .278 | 9 | – | 23 | .281 |
| American | 5 | – | 13 | .278 | 10 | – | 22 | .313 |
† 2022 Patriot League tournament winner

The 2021–22 Bucknell Bison men's basketball team represented Bucknell University in the 2021–22 NCAA Division I men's basketball season. The Bison, led by seventh-year head coach Nathan Davis, played their home games at Sojka Pavilion in Lewisburg, Pennsylvania as members of the Patriot League.

== Previous season ==
In a season limited due to the ongoing COVID-19 pandemic, the Bison finished the 2020–21 season 5–7, 4–6 in Patriot League play to finish in second place in the Central Division. As the No. 6 seed in the Patriot League tournament, they upset Lafayette in the quarterfinals, before losing to eventual tournament champions Colgate in the semifinals.

== Roster ==
2021–22 Bucknell Bison men's basketball team
Players
Coaches

| Pos. | # | Name | Height | Weight | Year | Previous school | Hometown |
|---|---|---|---|---|---|---|---|
| F | 1 | Ian Motta | 6 ft 6 in (1.98 m) | 196 lb (89 kg) | Fr | Allen | Allen, TX |
| F | 3 | Malachi Rhodes | 6 ft 8 in (2.03 m) | 233 lb (106 kg) | Jr | Wheeler | Marietta, GA |
| G | 5 | Elvin Edmonds IV | 6 ft 2 in (1.88 m) | 184 lb (83 kg) | Fr | Hopewell | Hopewell, VA |
| G | 10 | Andrew Funk | 6 ft 5 in (1.96 m) | 188 lb (85 kg) | Sr | Archbishop Wood | Warrington, PA |
| G | 11 | Josh Adoh | 6 ft 3 in (1.91 m) | 206 lb (93 kg) | So | Combine Academy | Bellflower, CA |
| F | 12 | Brock Newton | 6 ft 7 in (2.01 m) | 200 lb (91 kg) | Fr | Toronto Basketball Academy | Fergus, ON |
| G | 13 | Josh Bascoe | 6 ft 0 in (1.83 m) | 180 lb (82 kg) | Fr | Putnam Science Academy | Milton, ON |
| G | 21 | Xander Rice | 6 ft 3 in (1.91 m) | 185 lb (84 kg) | Jr | The Patrick School | West Long Branch, NJ |
| C | 23 | Andre Screen | 7 ft 0 in (2.13 m) | 251 lb (114 kg) | So | St. Stephen's & St. Agnes School | Alexandria, VA |
| G | 25 | Alek Delev | 6 ft 0 in (1.83 m) | 140 lb (64 kg) | So | Second English Language School | Sofia, Bulgaria |
| F | 32 | Jake van der Heijden | 6 ft 9 in (2.06 m) | 218 lb (99 kg) | Jr | Ravenscroft | Raleigh, NC |
| C | 40 | Alex Timmerman | 6 ft 9 in (2.06 m) | 265 lb (120 kg) | Jr | Crystal Lake Central | Crystal Lake, IL |

Head coach

- Nathan Davis (Randolph–Macon)

Assistant coach(es)

- Paul Harrison (Washington and Lee)
- Joe Meehan (Lebanon Valley)
- Johnathan Brown (Dominican (NY))

Legend

- (C) Team captain
- (S) Suspended
- (I) Ineligible
- (W) Walk-on
- Injured
- Current redshirt

Roster
Last update: December 3, 2021

== Schedule and results ==
| Date time, TV | Rank^{#} | Opponent^{#} | Result | Record | Site (attendance) city, state |
Non-conference regular season
| November 9, 2021*; 8:00 pm, ACCNX | | at NC State | L 70–88 | 0–1 | PNC Arena (13,131); Raleigh, NC |
| November 14, 2021*; 2:00 pm, ESPN+ | | Penn | L 68–73 | 0–2 | Sojka Pavilion (1,406); Lewisburg, PA |
| November 17, 2021*; 7:00 pm, ESPN+ | | Rider | W 81–74 | 1–2 | Sojka Pavilion (1,176); Lewisburg, PA |
| November 20, 2021*; 7:00 pm, ESPN+ | | at Illinois State; Cancún Challenge campus game | L 100–105 ^{OT} | 1–3 | Redbird Arena (2,576); Normal, IL |
| November 23, 2021*; 3:00 pm, FloHoops | | vs. Mercer; Cancún Challenge Mayan semifinal | L 68–78 | 1–4 | Hard Rock Hotel Riviera (133); Cancún, Mexico |
| November 24, 2021*; 12:30 pm, FloHoops | | vs. Rider; Cancún Challenge Mayan consolation | L 79–85 | 1–5 | Hard Rock Hotel Riviera (103); Cancún, Mexico |
| November 28, 2021*; 2:00 pm, ESPN+ | | Siena | W 65–56 ^{OT} | 2–5 | Sojka Pavilion (1,146); Lewisburg, PA |
| December 1, 2021*; 7:00 pm, NEC Front Row | | at Saint Francis (PA) | L 67–93 | 2–6 | DeGol Arena (289); Loretto, PA |
| December 4, 2021*; 2:00 pm, SNY/FloHoops | | at Hofstra | L 69–88 | 2–7 | Mack Sports Complex (1,978); Hempstead, NY |
| December 7, 2021*; 7:00 pm, ESPN+ | | at Princeton | L 69–82 | 2–8 | Jadwin Gymnasium; Princeton, NJ |
| December 18, 2021*; 2:00 pm, ESPN+/WQMY | | La Salle | W 82–70 | 3–8 | Sojka Pavilion (1,230); Lewisburg, PA |
| December 22, 2021*; 4:00 pm, ESPN+ | | at Richmond | L 50–81 | 3–9 | Robins Center (5,037); Richmond, VA |
| December 29, 2021*; 7:00 pm, ESPN3 | | at Albany | Postponed due to COVID-19 issues | | SEFCU Arena; Albany, NY |
Patriot League regular season
| January 1, 2022; 1:00 pm, ESPN+ | | at Boston University | L 61–63 | 3–10 (0–1) | Case Gym (414); Boston, MA |
| January 4, 2022; 7:00 pm, ESPN+ | | Army | L 89–96 | 3–11 (0–2) | Sojka Pavilion (807); Lewisburg, PA |
| January 7, 2022; 7:00 pm, ESPN+ | | at Navy | L 55–73 | 3–12 (0–3) | Alumni Hall (1,008); Annapolis, MD |
| January 10, 2022; 7:00 pm, ESPN+ | | at Loyola (MD) | L 67–71 | 3–13 (0–4) | Reitz Arena (250); Baltimore, MD |
| January 13, 2022; 7:00 pm, ESPN+ | | Lehigh | L 64–97 | 3–14 (0–5) | Sojka Pavilion (684); Lewisburg, PA |
| January 16, 2022; 2:00 pm, ESPN+ | | at American | L 55–63 | 3–15 (0–6) | Bender Arena (450); Washington, D.C. |
| January 19, 2022; 7:00 pm, ESPN+ | | Colgate | L 56–75 | 3–16 (0–7) | Sojka Pavilion (874); Lewisburg, PA |
| January 22, 2022; 2:00 pm, ESPN+ | | at Holy Cross | W 68–65 | 4–16 (1–7) | Hart Center (191); Worcester, MA |
| January 26, 2022; 7:00 pm, ESPN+/WQMY | | Navy | L 63–81 | 4–17 (1–8) | Sojka Pavilion (701); Lewisburg, PA |
| January 30, 2022; 6:00 pm, CBSSN | | Loyola (MD) | W 82–80 ^{OT} | 5–17 (2–8) | Sojka Pavilion (771); Lewisburg, PA |
| February 2, 2022; 7:00 pm, ESPN+ | | at Colgate | L 69–83 | 5–18 (2–9) | Cotterell Court (405); Hamilton, NY |
| February 5, 2022; 2:00 pm, ESPN+ | | at Lafayette | L 72–74 ^{OT} | 5–19 (2–10) | Kirby Sports Center (1,667); Easton, PA |
| February 9, 2022; 7:00 pm, ESPN+ | | American | W 68–66 | 6–19 (3–10) | Sojka Pavilion (633); Lewisburg, PA |
| February 12, 2022; 2:00 pm, ESPN+/WQMY | | Holy Cross | L 72–78 | 6–20 (3–11) | Sojka Pavilion (947); Lewisburg, PA |
| February 14, 2022; 7:00 pm, CBSSN | | at Lehigh | L 77–86 | 6–21 (3–12) | Stabler Arena (659); Bethlehem, PA |
| February 19, 2022; 4:00 pm, ESPN+ | | Lafayette | W 92–89 ^{OT} | 7–21 (4–12) | Sojka Pavilion (883); Lewisburg, PA |
| February 23, 2022; 6:00 pm, ESPN+ | | at Army | L 60–73 | 7–22 (4–13) | Christl Arena (637); West Point, NY |
| February 26, 2022; 2:00 pm, ESPN+ | | Boston University | W 89–78 | 8–22 (5–13) | Sojka Pavilion (1,031); Lewisburg, PA |
Patriot League tournament
| March 1, 2022; 7:00 pm, ESPN+ | (9) | at (8) Lafayette; First Round | W 82–81 ^{OT} | 9–22 | Kirby Sports Center (1,740); Easton, PA |
| March 3, 2022; 7:00 pm, ESPN+ | (9) | at (1) Colgate; Quarterfinals | L 68–96 | 9–23 | Cotterell Court (1,414); Hamilton, NY |
*Non-conference game. ^{#}Rankings from AP Poll. (#) Tournament seedings in parentheses. All times are in Eastern.
