= 2021–22 Army Black Knights men's basketball team =

American college basketball season

2021–22 Army Black Knights men's basketball
- Conference: Patriot League
- Record: 15–16 (9–9 Patriot)
- Head coach: Jimmy Allen (6th season)
- Associate head coach: Ben Wilkins
- Assistant coaches: David Belfield; Keith Chesley; Nick Thorsen; Charles Mann Jr.
- Home arena: Christl Arena

2021–22 Patriot League men's basketball standings
| | Conf. | | | | Overall |
| Team | W | | L | PCT | W | | L | PCT |
|---|---|---|---|---|---|---|---|---|
| Colgate † | 16 | – | 2 | .889 | 23 | – | 12 | .657 |
| Navy | 12 | – | 6 | .667 | 21 | – | 11 | .656 |
| Boston University | 11 | – | 7 | .611 | 22 | – | 13 | .629 |
| Lehigh | 10 | – | 8 | .556 | 13 | – | 19 | .406 |
| Army | 9 | – | 9 | .500 | 15 | – | 16 | .484 |
| Loyola | 8 | – | 10 | .444 | 14 | – | 16 | .467 |
| Holy Cross | 7 | – | 11 | .389 | 9 | – | 22 | .290 |
| Lafayette | 7 | – | 11 | .389 | 10 | – | 20 | .333 |
| Bucknell | 5 | – | 13 | .278 | 9 | – | 23 | .281 |
| American | 5 | – | 13 | .278 | 10 | – | 22 | .313 |
† 2022 Patriot League tournament winner

The 2021–22 Army Black Knights men's basketball team represented the United States Military Academy in the 2021–22 NCAA Division I men's basketball season. The Black Knights, led by sixth-year head coach Jimmy Allen, played their home games at Christl Arena in West Point, New York as members of the Patriot League.

The Black Knights finished the season 15–16, 9–9 in Patriot League play, to finish in fifth place. As the No. 5 seed, they lost to No. 4 seed Lehigh in the quarterfinals of the Patriot League tournament.

== Previous season ==
The Black Knights finished the 2020–21 season 12–10, 7–7 in Patriot League play, to finish in second place in the North Division. In the Patriot League tournament, they defeated American in the quarterfinals before being upset by last-placed Loyola (MD) in the semifinals. They received an invitation to the CBI, where they lost in the quarterfinals to Bellarmine.

== Roster ==
2021–22 Army Black Knights men's basketball team
Players
Coaches

| Pos. | # | Name | Height | Weight | Year | Previous school | Hometown |
|---|---|---|---|---|---|---|---|
| G | 0 | Josh Caldwell | 6 ft 2 in (1.88 m) | 185 lb (84 kg) | Sr | Heathwood (USMAPS) | Columbia, SC |
| G | 1 | Jalen Rucker | 5 ft 10 in (1.78 m) | 180 lb (82 kg) | So | Gilman (USMAPS) | Baltimore, MD |
| G | 2 | Brendan Thiele | 6 ft 5 in (1.96 m) | 205 lb (93 kg) | Sr | St. Peter's Prep | Kearny, NJ |
| F | 4 | Chris Mann | 6 ft 6 in (1.98 m) | 205 lb (93 kg) | Jr | Phillipsburg (USMAPS) | Phillipsburg, NJ |
| F | 5 | Griff Lamb | 6 ft 8 in (2.03 m) | 205 lb (93 kg) | Fr | Gilbert (USMAPS) | Holbrook, AZ |
| G | 10 | Isaiah Caldwell | 6 ft 4 in (1.93 m) | 163 lb (74 kg) | Fr | USMAPS | Columbia, SC |
| G | 12 | Blane St. Clair | 6 ft 5 in (1.96 m) | 202 lb (92 kg) | Fr | Davidson Day School | Boone, NC |
| G | 15 | Noah Jager | 5 ft 9 in (1.75 m) | 165 lb (75 kg) | So | Bloomington South | Bloomington, IN |
| G | 21 | Zach Lezanic | 6 ft 0 in (1.83 m) | 165 lb (75 kg) | So | Conestoga | Berwyn, PA |
| G | 22 | Kwabena Davis | 6 ft 3 in (1.91 m) | 182 lb (83 kg) | So | Byron P. Steele (USMAPS) | Columbia, SC |
| G | 23 | Aaron Duhart | 6 ft 0 in (1.83 m) | 190 lb (86 kg) | Sr | Trinity Episcopal (USMAPS) | Richmond, VA |
| G | 24 | Jared Cross | 6 ft 3 in (1.91 m) | 196 lb (89 kg) | So | St. Stephen's & St. Agnes | Leesburg, VA |
| G | 25 | Jordan Coleman | 6 ft 6 in (1.98 m) | 190 lb (86 kg) | Sr | Greenwood (USMAPS) | Greenwood, SC |
| F | 30 | Ben Kinker | 6 ft 9 in (2.06 m) | 220 lb (100 kg) | Sr | Oldenburg Academy (USMAPS) | Greensburg, IN |
| G | 31 | Blake Barker | 6 ft 2 in (1.88 m) | 200 lb (91 kg) | Fr | Columbus North | Columbus, IN |
| G | 32 | John Scully | 6 ft 1 in (1.85 m) | 185 lb (84 kg) | Sr | Flower Mound (USMAPS) | Flower Mound, TX |
| F | 33 | JT Dougherty | 6 ft 9 in (2.06 m) | 205 lb (93 kg) | Fr | River Falls | River Falls, WI |
| F | 34 | Charlie Peterson | 6 ft 9 in (2.06 m) | 223 lb (101 kg) | So | North Central | Indianapolis, IN |
| G | 35 | TJ Small | 6 ft 2 in (1.88 m) | 188 lb (85 kg) | Fr | Brother Martin (USMAPS) | Kenner, LA |
| F | 41 | Nolan Naess | 6 ft 8 in (2.03 m) | 197 lb (89 kg) | Fr | Laguna Beach (USMAPS) | Laguna Beach, CA |
| G | 42 | Luke Benson | 5 ft 11 in (1.8 m) | 170 lb (77 kg) | Fr | Marist School | Atlanta, GA |
| F | 44 | Matt Dove | 6 ft 10 in (2.08 m) | 240 lb (109 kg) | So | Princeton Community (USMAPS) | Princeton, IN |
| F | 52 | Ben Jensen | 6 ft 10 in (2.08 m) | 200 lb (91 kg) | Jr | W.T. Woodson | Fairfax, VA |
| G | 53 | Zach Rocco | 6 ft 1 in (1.85 m) | 180 lb (82 kg) | So | Penn-Trafford | Export, PA |
| F | 54 | Abe Johnson | 6 ft 8 in (2.03 m) | 225 lb (102 kg) | So | Hellgate | Missoula, MT |
| F | 55 | AJ Allenspach | 6 ft 8 in (2.03 m) | 225 lb (102 kg) | Fr | Lake Norman Christian School | Simpsonville, SC |

Head coach

- Jimmy Allen (Emory & Henry)

Assistant coach(es)

- Ben Wilkins (NC State)
- David Belfield (USC Aiken)
- Keith Chesley (Maine–Augusta)
- Nick Thorsen (Penn State Behrend)
- Charles Mann Jr. (Georgia)

Legend

- (C) Team captain
- (S) Suspended
- (I) Ineligible
- (W) Walk-on
- Injured
- Current redshirt

Roster
Last update: December 2, 2021

== Schedule and results ==
| Date time, TV | Rank^{#} | Opponent^{#} | Result | Record | Site (attendance) city, state |
Non-conference regular season
| November 9, 2021*; 7:00 p.m., ESPN+ | | New Paltz | W 83–52 | 1–0 | Christl Arena (511); West Point, NY |
| November 12, 2021*; 7:00 p.m., ACCN | | at No. 9 Duke; Duke Veterans Day Weekend Showcase | L 56–82 | 1–1 | Cameron Indoor Stadium (9,314); Durham, NC |
| November 13, 2021*; 2:30 p.m. | | vs. Hartford; Duke Veterans Day Weekend Showcase | W 86–79 | 2–1 | Cameron Indoor Stadium; Durham, NC |
| November 17, 2021*; 6:00 p.m., ESPN+ | | Merrimack | W 74–51 | 3–1 | Christl Arena (527); West Point, NY |
| November 20, 2021*; 4:00 p.m., ESPN+ | | at La Salle | L 58–61 | 3–2 | Tom Gola Arena (1,712); Philadelphia, PA |
| November 24, 2021*; 4:00 p.m. | | Wagner | Canceled | | Christl Arena; West Point, NY |
| November 27, 2021*; 1:00 p.m. | | Marist | W 65–61 | 4–2 | Christl Arena (665); West Point, NY |
| November 30, 2021*; 7:00 p.m., ESPN+ | | Siena | L 67–83 | 4–3 | Christl Arena (551); West Point, NY |
| December 4, 2021*; 4:00 p.m., Stadium | | at Air Force; Rivalry | L 58–76 | 4–4 | Clune Arena (1,853); Colorado Springs, CO |
| December 7, 2021*; 6:00 p.m. | | Purchase | W 97–40 | 5–4 | Christl Arena (454); West Point, NY |
| December 10, 2021*; 7:00 p.m., ESPN3 | | at NJIT | W 66–49 | 6–4 | Wellness and Events Center; Newark, NJ |
| December 19, 2021*; 2:00 p.m. | | at LIU | L 65–90 | 6–5 | Steinberg Wellness Center; Brooklyn, NY |
| December 22, 2021*; 3:00 p.m., SECN+ | | at South Carolina | L 75–105 | 6–6 | Colonial Life Arena (9,181); Columbia, SC |
Patriot League regular season
| January 1, 2022; 2:00 p.m. | | Loyola (MD) | W 77–74 ^{OT} | 7–6 (1–0) | Christl Arena (623); West Point, NY |
| January 4, 2022; 7:00 p.m. | | at Bucknell | W 96–89 | 8–6 (2–0) | Sojka Pavilion (807); Lewisburg, PA |
| January 7, 2022; 5:00 p.m. | | Lehigh | W 77–55 | 9–6 (3–0) | Christl Arena (580); West Point, NY |
| January 10, 2022; 6:00 p.m., ESPN+ | | at Colgate | L 57–76 | 9–7 (3–1) | Cotterell Court (303); Hamilton, NY |
| January 13, 2022; 6:00 p.m., ESPN+ | | Boston University | W 73–63 | 10–7 (4–1) | Christl Arena (645); West Point, NY |
| January 16, 2022; 2:00 p.m., ESPN+ | | at Lafayette | L 54–68 | 10–8 (4–2) | Kirby Sports Center (1,357); Easton, PA |
| January 19, 2022; 6:00 p.m. | | American | W 76–66 | 11–8 (5–2) | Christl Arena (508); West Point, NY |
| January 22, 2022; 1:30 p.m., CBSSN | | at Navy | W 74–73 ^{OT} | 12–8 (6–2) | Alumni Hall (5,168); Annapolis, MD |
| January 26, 2022; 7:00 p.m. | | at Lehigh | L 71–84 | 12–9 (6–3) | Stabler Arena (744); Bethlehem, PA |
| January 29, 2022; 1:00 p.m. | | Lafayette | W 60–56 | 13–9 (7–3) | Christl Arena (735); West Point, NY |
| February 2, 2022; 7:00 p.m., ESPN+ | | at Loyola (MD) | L 57–61 | 13–10 (7–4) | Reitz Arena (704); Baltimore, MD |
| February 5, 2022; 1:00 p.m., ESPN+ | | Holy Cross | L 65–69 | 13–11 (7–5) | Christl Arena (751); West Point, NY |
| February 9, 2022; 7:00 p.m., ESPN+ | | at Boston University | L 74–75 | 13–12 (7–6) | Case Gym (500); Boston, MA |
| February 12, 2022; 1:30 p.m. | | Navy | L 49–52 | 13–13 (7–7) | Christl Arena (4,453); West Point, NY |
| February 16, 2022; 6:00 p.m., ESPN+ | | Colgate | L 90–100 | 13–14 (7–8) | Christl Arena (526); West Point, NY |
| February 19, 2022; 2:00 p.m., ESPN+ | | at American | L 67–83 | 13–15 (7–9) | Bender Arena (1,047); Washington, D.C. |
| February 23, 2022; 6:00 p.m., ESPN+ | | Bucknell | W 73–60 | 14–15 (8–9) | Christl Arena (637); West Point, NY |
| February 26, 2022; 2:00 p.m., ESPN+ | | at Holy Cross | W 66–58 | 15–15 (9–9) | Hart Center (1,684); Worcester, MA |
Patriot League tournament
| March 3, 2022; 7:00 p.m., ESPN+ | (5) | at (4) Lehigh; Quarterfinals | L 77–91 | 15–16 | Stabler Arena (1,732); Bethlehem, PA |
*Non-conference game. ^{#}Rankings from AP poll. (#) Tournament seedings in parentheses. All times are in Eastern.
