= 2022 Patriot League men's basketball tournament =

- Classification: Division I
- Season: 2021–22
- Teams: 10
- Site: Campus sites
- Champions: Colgate (5th title)
- Winning coach: Matt Langel (3rd title)
- MVP: Jack Ferguson (Colgate)
- Television: ESPN+, CBSSN

2021–22 Patriot League men's basketball standings
	Conf.				Overall
Team	W		L	PCT	W		L	PCT
Colgate †	16	–	2	.889	23	–	12	.657
Navy	12	–	6	.667	21	–	11	.656
Boston University	11	–	7	.611	22	–	13	.629
Lehigh	10	–	8	.556	13	–	19	.406
Army	9	–	9	.500	15	–	16	.484
Loyola	8	–	10	.444	14	–	16	.467
Holy Cross	7	–	11	.389	9	–	22	.290
Lafayette	7	–	11	.389	10	–	20	.333
Bucknell	5	–	13	.278	9	–	23	.281
American	5	–	13	.278	10	–	22	.313
† 2022 Patriot League tournament winner

The 2022 Patriot League men's basketball tournament was the conference postseason tournament for the Patriot League. The tournament was held on four dates during March 2022 at campus sites of the higher seeds. The winner, Colgate, received the conference's automatic bid to the NCAA tournament.

== Seeds ==
All ten teams in the conference standings qualified for the tournament. The teams were seeded by record in conference, with a tiebreaker system to seed teams with identical conference records.

The tiebreakers used by the Patriot League are: 1) head-to-head record of teams with identical record, 2) comparison of records against individual teams in the conference starting with the top-ranked team(s) and working down, 3) NCAA NET Rankings available on day following the conclusion of Patriot League regular-season play and 4) comparison of winning percentage versus out-of-league common opponents. Holy Cross was given the higher seed than Lafayette due to having a better top-to-bottom record (by defeating Navy). Bucknell was given the higher seed than American due to having a better top-to-bottom record (by defeating Boston University).

Seed	School	Conference	NET ranking (February 28, 2021)
1	Colgate	16–2	137
2	Navy	12–6	157
3	Boston University	11–7	201
4	Lehigh	10–8	301
5	Army	9–9	272
6	Loyola	8–10	259
7	Holy Cross	7–11	343
8	Lafayette	7–11	312
9	Bucknell	5–13	335
10	American	5–13	338

== Schedule ==
Game	Time	Matchup	Score	Television	Attendance
First round – Tuesday, March 1
1	7:00 pm	No. 10 American at No. 7 Holy Cross	69–63	ESPN+	898
2	7:00 pm	No. 9 Bucknell at No. 8 Lafayette	82–81^{OT}	ESPN+	1,740
Quarterfinals – Thursday, March 3
3	7:00 pm	No. 9 Bucknell at No. 1 Colgate	68–96	ESPN+	1,414
4	7:00 pm	No. 10 American at No. 2 Navy	64–71	ESPN+	1,011
5	7:00 pm	No. 6 Loyola at No. 3 Boston University	64–76	ESPN+	652
6	7:00 pm	No. 5 Army at No. 4 Lehigh	77–91	ESPN+	1,732
Semifinals – Sunday, March 6
7	2:00 pm	No. 4 Lehigh at No. 1 Colgate	61–81	CBSSN	1,161
8	4:00 pm	No. 3 Boston University at No. 2 Navy	80–85^{OT}	CBSSN	1,179
Championship – Wednesday, March 9
9	7:30 pm	No. 2 Navy at No. 1 Colgate	58–74	CBSSN	1,879
Game times in ET. Rankings denote tournament seeding. All games hosted by higher-seeded team.

== Bracket ==
First round Tuesday, March 1, 2022; ESPN+
8	Lafayette	81
9	Bucknell	82*
7	Holy Cross	63
10	American	69

Quarterfinals; Thursday March 3, 2022; ESPN+
1	Colgate	96
9	Bucknell	68
4	Lehigh	91
5	Army	77
2	Navy	71
10	American	64
3	Boston University	76
6	Loyola (MD)	64

Semifinals; Sunday, March 6, 2022; CBSSN
1	Colgate	81
4	Lehigh	61
2	Navy	85*
3	Boston University	80

Championship; Wednesday, March 9, 2022; CBSSN
1	Colgate	74
2	Navy	58

* denotes overtime period
