= 2021–22 Duke Blue Devils men's basketball team =

American college basketball season

2021–22 Duke Blue Devils men's basketball

ACC regular season champions

NCAA tournament, Final Four
- Conference: Atlantic Coast Conference

Ranking
- Coaches: No. 3
- AP: No. 9
- Record: 32–7 (16–4 ACC)
- Head coach: Mike Krzyzewski (42nd season)
- Associate head coach: Jon Scheyer
- Assistant coaches: Chris Carrawell; Nolan Smith
- Home arena: Cameron Indoor Stadium

2021–22 ACC men's basketball standings
	Conf.				Overall
Team	W		L	PCT	W		L	PCT
No. 9 Duke	16	–	4	.800	32	–	7	.821
North Carolina	15	–	5	.750	29	–	10	.744
Notre Dame	15	–	5	.750	24	–	11	.686
Miami (FL)	14	–	6	.700	26	–	11	.703
Wake Forest	13	–	7	.650	25	–	10	.714
Virginia	12	–	8	.600	21	–	14	.600
Virginia Tech †	11	–	9	.550	23	–	13	.639
Florida State	10	–	10	.500	17	–	14	.548
Syracuse	9	–	11	.450	16	–	17	.485
Clemson	8	–	12	.400	17	–	16	.515
Louisville	6	–	14	.300	13	–	19	.406
Boston College	6	–	14	.300	13	–	20	.394
Pittsburgh	6	–	14	.300	11	–	21	.344
Georgia Tech	5	–	15	.250	12	–	20	.375
NC State	4	–	16	.200	11	–	21	.344
† 2022 ACC tournament winner Rankings from AP poll

The 2021–22 Duke Blue Devils men's basketball team represented Duke University during the 2021–22 NCAA Division I men's basketball season. They played their home games at Cameron Indoor Stadium in Durham, North Carolina, as a member of the Atlantic Coast Conference.

On June 2, 2021, the school announced that Coach Mike Krzyzewski would retire following the completion of the 2021–22 season after 42 years as head coach of Duke and 47 years of coaching. Associate head coach Jon Scheyer was named the head coach in waiting, to become the team's new head coach after the conclusion of the season.

After losing to longtime rival North Carolina in their final home game, the team made it to the NCAA Tournament for the first time since 2019, as the 2020 tournament was cancelled and Duke did not make the 2021 tournament. Duke reached the Final Four for the 13th time under Krzyzewski, where they again lost to North Carolina 81–77 in their first-ever NCAA tournament meeting.

== Previous season ==
In a season limited due to the ongoing COVID-19 pandemic, the Blue Devils finished the 2020–21 season 13–11, 9–9 to finish in 10th place in ACC play. Their season ended with their withdrawal from the ACC tournament due to positive COVID-19 tests within the program. As a result, the Blue Devils failed to receive a bid to the NCAA tournament for the first time since 1995, ending the second longest active streak of NCAA appearances.

== Offseason ==
=== Coaching changes ===
After it became clear that Scheyer would be taking over for Coach K in 2022, associate head coach Nate James left the school to become the new head coach at Austin Peay. Nolan Smith, previously the director of basketball operations, was promoted to assistant coach, joining Jon Scheyer and Chris Carrawell.

=== Departures ===
Duke departures
Name	Number	Pos.	Height	Weight	Year	Hometown	Reason for departure
Jalen Johnson	1	F	6'9"	220	Freshman	Milwaukee, WI	Opted out (mid-season) / 2021 NBA draft
D. J. Steward	2	G	6'2"	163	Freshman	Chicago, IL	Declared for the 2021 NBA draft
Jaemyn Brakefield	5	F	6'8"	216	Freshman	Jackson, MS	Transferred to Ole Miss
Patrick Tapé	12	F	6'9"	233	Graduate student	Charlotte, NC	Transferred to San Francisco
Jordan Goldwire	14	G	6'2"	184	Senior	Norcross, GA	Graduated / transferred to Oklahoma
Matthew Hurt	21	F	6'9"	235	Sophomore	Rochester, MN	Declared for the 2021 NBA draft
Henry Coleman III	34	F	6'7"	229	Freshman	Richmond, VA	Transferred to Texas A&M
Mike Buckmire	51	G	6'2"	175	Senior	Blue Bell, PA	Graduated

=== Incoming transfers ===
Duke incoming transfers
Name	Number	Pos.	Height	Weight	Year	Hometown	Previous school	Years remaining	Date eligible
Theo John	12	F	6'9"	242	Graduate student	Minneapolis, MN	Marquette	1	October 1, 2021
Bates Jones	34	F	6'8"	222	Graduate student	Charlotte, NC	Davidson	1	October 1, 2021

=== 2021 recruiting class ===
College recruiting
Name	Hometown	School	Height	Weight	Commit date
Adrian Griffin Jr. SF	Ossining, NY	Archbishop Stepinac	6 ft 7 in (2.01 m)	203 lb (92 kg)	Nov 4, 2019
Adrian Griffin Jr. SF	Recruit ratings: Rivals: 247Sports: ESPN: (89)				
Paolo Banchero; PF	Seattle, WA	O'Dea	6 ft 10 in (2.08 m)	232 lb (105 kg)	Aug 20, 2020
Paolo Banchero; PF	Recruit ratings: Rivals: 247Sports: ESPN: (97)				
Trevor Keels; SG	Clinton, MD	Paul VI Catholic	6 ft 5 in (1.96 m)	210 lb (95 kg)	Apr 2, 2021
Trevor Keels; SG	Recruit ratings: Rivals: 247Sports: ESPN: (90)				
Jaylen Blakes; CG	Somerset, NJ	Blair Academy	6 ft 2 in (1.88 m)	185 lb (84 kg)	Apr 19, 2021
Jaylen Blakes; CG	Recruit ratings: Rivals: 247Sports: ESPN: (82)				
Overall recruit ranking: Rivals: 3 247Sports: 3
Note: In many cases, Scout, Rivals, 247Sports, On3, and ESPN may conflict in their listings of height and weight.; In these cases, the average was taken. ESPN grades are on a 100-point scale.; Sources: "2021 Team Ranking". Rivals.

=== 2022 recruiting class ===
College recruiting
Name	Hometown	School	Height	Weight	Commit date
Dereck Lively II; C	Chester, PA	Westtown School	7 ft 1 in (2.16 m)	215 lb (98 kg)	Sep 20, 2021
Dereck Lively II; C	Recruit ratings: Rivals: 247Sports: ESPN: (94)				
Dariq Whitehead; SF	Newark, NJ	Montverde Academy (FL)	6 ft 6 in (1.98 m)	190 lb (86 kg)	Aug 1, 2021
Dariq Whitehead; SF	Recruit ratings: Rivals: 247Sports: ESPN: (94)				
Kyle Filipowski; PF / C	Westtown, NY	Wilbraham & Monson Academy (MA)	6 ft 11 in (2.11 m)	230 lb (100 kg)	Apr 2, 2021
Kyle Filipowski; PF / C	Recruit ratings: Rivals: 247Sports: ESPN: (93)				
Tyrese Proctor*; SG	Canberra, Australia	NBA Global Academy	6 ft 4 in (1.93 m)	170 lb (77 kg)	Apr 7, 2022
Tyrese Proctor*; SG	Recruit ratings: Rivals: 247Sports: ESPN: (91)				
Mark Mitchell; PF	Shawnee Mission, KS	Sunrise Christian Academy	6 ft 8 in (2.03 m)	215 lb (98 kg)	Dec 10, 2021
Mark Mitchell; PF	Recruit ratings: Rivals: 247Sports: ESPN: (89)				
Jaden Schutt; SG	Yorkville, IL	Yorkville High School	6 ft 4 in (1.93 m)	175 lb (79 kg)	Sep 2, 2021
Jaden Schutt; SG	Recruit ratings: Rivals: 247Sports: ESPN: (85)				
Christian Reeves; C	Charlotte, NC	Oak Hill Academy (VA)	6 ft 11 in (2.11 m)	210 lb (95 kg)	Dec 14, 2021
Christian Reeves; C	Recruit ratings: Rivals: 247Sports: ESPN: (80)				
Overall recruit ranking: Rivals: 3 247Sports: 3
Note: In many cases, Scout, Rivals, 247Sports, On3, and ESPN may conflict in their listings of height and weight.; In these cases, the average was taken. ESPN grades are on a 100-point scale.; Sources: "2022 Team Ranking". Rivals.

*Originally class of 2023, but reclassified to 2022.

== Roster ==
2021–22 Duke Blue Devils men's basketball team
Players
Coaches

Pos.	#	Name	Height	Weight	Year	Previous school	Hometown
F	0	Wendell Moore Jr.	6 ft 5 in (1.96 m)	213 lb (97 kg)	Jr	Cox Mill	Charlotte, NC
G	1	Trevor Keels	6 ft 5 in (1.96 m)	221 lb (100 kg)	Fr	Paul VI Catholic	Clinton, MD
G	2	Jaylen Blakes	6 ft 2 in (1.88 m)	208 lb (94 kg)	Fr	Blair Academy	Somerset, NJ
G	3	Jeremy Roach	6 ft 2 in (1.88 m)	172 lb (78 kg)	So	Paul VI Catholic	Leesburg, VA
F	5	Paolo Banchero	6 ft 10 in (2.08 m)	250 lb (113 kg)	Fr	O'Dea	Seattle, WA
F	12	Theo John	6 ft 9 in (2.06 m)	242 lb (110 kg)	GS	Champlin Park; Marquette	Minneapolis, MN
F	13	Joey Baker	6 ft 6 in (1.98 m)	206 lb (93 kg)	Sr	Trinity Christian School	Fayetteville, NC
C	15	Mark Williams	7 ft 1 in (2.16 m)	242 lb (110 kg)	So	IMG Academy	Virginia Beach, VA
F	21	AJ Griffin	6 ft 6 in (1.98 m)	222 lb (101 kg)	Fr	Archbishop Stepinac	Ossining, NY
G	30	Michael Savarino	6 ft 0 in (1.83 m)	182 lb (83 kg)	Jr	Durham Academy	Durham, NC
F	34	Bates Jones	6 ft 8 in (2.03 m)	222 lb (101 kg)	GS	Charlotte Latin School; Davidson	Charlotte, NC
F	45	Keenan Worthington	6 ft 8 in (2.03 m)	224 lb (102 kg)	Jr	Blair Academy	Chapel Hill, NC
C	52	Stanley Borden (W)	7 ft 0 in (2.13 m)	240 lb (109 kg)	Fr	Istanbul International Community School	Istanbul, Turkey
G	55	Spencer Hubbard (W)	5 ft 8 in (1.73 m)	160 lb (73 kg)	So	Harvard-Westlake	Los Angeles, CA

Head coach

Mike Krzyzewski (Army)

Assistant coach(es)

- Jon Scheyer (Duke)
- Chris Carrawell (Duke)
- Nolan Smith (Duke)

Legend

- (C) Team captain
- (S) Suspended
- (I) Ineligible
- (W) Walk-on
- Injured
- Current redshirt

Roster
Last update: October 4, 2021

== Schedule and results ==
Duke hosted a multiple-team event in which they played Army and Campbell.

Date time, TV	Rank^{#}	Opponent^{#}	Result	Record	High points	High rebounds	High assists	Site (attendance) city, state
Exhibition
October 30, 2021*; 1:30 p.m., ACCNX	No. 9	Winston-Salem State	W 106–38	–	21 – Banchero	9 – Banchero	7 – Roach	Cameron Indoor Stadium (9,314); Durham, NC
Non-conference regular season
November 9, 2021*; 9:30 p.m., ESPN	No. 9	vs. No. 10 Kentucky; Champions Classic	W 79–71	1–0	25 – Keels	7 – Tied	3 – Moore	Madison Square Garden (18,132); New York, NY
November 12, 2021*; 7:00 p.m., ACCN	No. 9	Army; Duke Veteran's Day Weekend Showcase	W 82–56	2–0	19 – Moore	12 – Banchero	10 – Moore	Cameron Indoor Stadium (9,314); Durham, NC
November 13, 2021*; 8:00 p.m., ACCNX	No. 9	Campbell; Duke Veteran's Day Weekend Showcase	W 67–56	3–0	18 – Banchero	7 – Banchero	5 – Moore	Cameron Indoor Stadium (9,314); Durham, NC
November 16, 2021*; 7:00 p.m., ACCRSN	No. 7	Gardner–Webb	W 92–52	4–0	18 – Keels	8 – Banchero	6 – Roach	Cameron Indoor Stadium (9,314); Durham, NC
November 19, 2021*; 8:00 p.m., ACCN	No. 7	Lafayette	W 88–55	5–0	23 – Moore	15 – Williams	5 – Roach	Cameron Indoor Stadium (9,314); Durham, NC
November 22, 2021*; 9:00 p.m., ACCN	No. 5	The Citadel	W 107–81	6–0	28 – Banchero	8 – Tied	9 – Moore	Cameron Indoor Stadium (9,314); Durham, NC
November 26, 2021*; 10:30 p.m., ESPN	No. 5	vs. No. 1 Gonzaga; Continental Tire Challenge	W 84–81	7–0	21 – Banchero	9 – Williams	6 – Tied	T-Mobile Arena (20,389); Paradise, NV
November 30, 2021*; 9:30 p.m., ESPN	No. 1	at Ohio State; ACC–Big Ten Challenge	L 66–71	7–1	17 – Moore	8 – Moore	5 – Moore	Value City Arena (18,809); Columbus, OH
December 14, 2021*; 8:00 p.m., ACCN	No. 2	South Carolina State	W 103–62	8–1	19 – Griffin	7 – Banchero	6 – Banchero	Cameron Indoor Stadium (9,314); Durham, NC
December 16, 2021*; 7:00 p.m., ESPN2	No. 2	Appalachian State	W 92–67	9–1	21 – Moore	6 – Banchero	6 – Tied	Cameron Indoor Stadium (9,314); Durham, NC
December 18, 2021*; 7:00 p.m., ACCN	No. 2	Elon	W 87–56	10–1	19 – Keels	9 – Banchero	5 – Moore	Cameron Indoor Stadium (9,314); Durham, NC
ACC regular season
December 22, 2021; 9:00 p.m., ESPN2	No. 2	Virginia Tech	W 76–65	11–1 (1–0)	23 – Banchero	8 – Banchero	4 – Moore	Cameron Indoor Stadium (9,314); Durham, NC
January 4, 2022; 9:00 p.m., ACCN	No. 2	Georgia Tech	W 69–57	12–1 (2–0)	17 – Banchero	14 – Williams	4 – Banchero	Cameron Indoor Stadium (9,314); Durham, NC
January 8, 2022; 8:00 p.m., ACCN	No. 2	Miami (FL)	L 74–76	12–2 (2–1)	20 – Banchero	12 – Moore Jr.	7 – Moore Jr.	Cameron Indoor Stadium (9,314); Durham, NC
January 12, 2022; 7:00 p.m., ACCN	No. 8	at Wake Forest	W 76–64	13–2 (3–1)	24 – Banchero	7 – Williams	6 – Moore Jr.	LJVM Coliseum (14,213); Winston-Salem, NC
January 15, 2022; 2:00 p.m., ABC	No. 8	NC State	W 88–73	14–2 (4–1)	21 – Banchero	11 – Williams	9 – Keels	Cameron Indoor Stadium (9,314); Durham, NC
January 18, 2022; 9:00 p.m., ESPN	No. 6	at Florida State	L 78–79 ^{OT}	14–3 (4–2)	20 – Banchero	12 – Banchero	7 – Banchero	Donald L. Tucker Civic Center (11,500); Tallahassee, FL
January 22, 2022; 12:00 p.m., ESPN	No. 6	Syracuse	W 79–59	15–3 (5–2)	15 – Tied	13 – Banchero	9 – Roach	Cameron Indoor Stadium (9,314); Durham, NC
January 25, 2022; 7:00 p.m., ESPN2	No. 9	Clemson	W 71–69	16–3 (6–2)	19 – Banchero	10 – Williams	9 – Roach	Cameron Indoor Stadium (9,314); Durham, NC
January 29, 2022; 12:00 p.m., ESPN	No. 9	at Louisville	W 74–65	17–3 (7–2)	22 – Griffin	15 – Banchero	5 – Tied	KFC Yum! Center (18,493); Louisville, KY
January 31, 2022; 7:00 p.m., ESPN	No. 9	at Notre Dame; Rescheduled from January 1	W 57–43	18–3 (8–2)	21 – Banchero	9 – 3 tied	4 – Keels	Edmund P. Joyce Center (9,149); South Bend, IN
February 5, 2022; 6:00 p.m., ESPN	No. 9	at North Carolina; Rivalry/College GameDay	W 87–67	19–3 (9–2)	27 – Griffin	10 – Banchero	5 – Moore Jr.	Dean Smith Center (21,750); Chapel Hill, NC
February 7, 2022; 7:00 p.m., ESPN	No. 7	Virginia	L 68–69	19–4 (9–3)	16 – Williams	9 – Banchero	4 – Tied	Cameron Indoor Stadium (9,314); Durham, NC
February 10, 2022; 8:00 p.m., ACCN	No. 7	at Clemson; Rescheduled from Dec. 29, 2021	W 82–64	20–4 (10–3)	25 – Keels	11 – Keels	8 – Moore	Littlejohn Coliseum (9,000); Clemson, SC
February 12, 2022; 5:00 p.m., ACCN	No. 7	at Boston College	W 72–61	21–4 (11–3)	16 – Banchero	14 – Banchero	3 – Banchero	Conte Forum (8,606); Chestnut Hill, MA
February 15, 2022; 7:00 p.m., ESPN	No. 9	Wake Forest	W 76–74	22–4 (12–3)	16 – Tied	10 – Williams	6 – Banchero	Cameron Indoor Stadium (9,314); Durham, NC
February 19, 2022; 6:00 p.m., ESPN	No. 9	Florida State	W 88–70	23–4 (13–3)	17 – Banchero	8 – Banchero	8 – Keels	Cameron Indoor Stadium (9,314); Durham, NC
February 23, 2022; 7:00 p.m., ESPN	No. 7	at Virginia	W 65–61	24–4 (14–3)	15 – Roach	10 – Williams	5 – Banchero	John Paul Jones Arena (14,629); Charlottesville, VA
February 26, 2022; 6:00 p.m., ESPN	No. 7	at Syracuse	W 97–72	25–4 (15–3)	28 – Williams	12 – Williams	9 – Banchero	Carrier Dome (31,803); Syracuse, NY
March 1, 2022; 8:00 p.m., ACCN	No. 4	at Pittsburgh	W 86–56	26–4 (16–3)	27 – Keels	7 – Griffin	5 – Moore	Petersen Events Center (12,095); Pittsburgh, PA
March 5, 2022; 6:00 p.m., ESPN	No. 4	North Carolina; Rivalry/College GameDay	L 81–94	26–5 (16–4)	23 – Banchero	13 – Williams	7 – Moore Jr.	Cameron Indoor Stadium (9,314); Durham, NC
ACC Tournament
March 10, 2022; 12:00 p.m., ESPN	(1) No. 7	vs. (9) Syracuse; Quarterfinals	W 88–79	27–5	26 – Moore	16 – Williams	8 – Moore	Barclays Center (11,511); Brooklyn, NY
March 11, 2022; 7:00 p.m., ESPN	(1) No. 7	vs. (4) Miami; Semifinals	W 80–76	28–5	21 – Griffin	11 – Banchero	4 – Banchero	Barclays Center (15,994); Brooklyn, NY
March 12, 2022; 8:30 p.m., ESPN	(1) No. 7	vs. (7) Virginia Tech; Championship	L 67–82	28–6	20 – Banchero	6 – Moore	4 – Keels	Barclays Center (17,764); Brooklyn, NY
NCAA tournament
March 18, 2022; 7:10 p.m., CBS	(2 W) No. 9	vs. (15 W) Cal State Fullerton; First Round	W 78–61	29–6	17 – Banchero	10 – Banchero	6 – Moore Jr.	Bon Secours Wellness Arena (14,295); Greenville, SC
March 20, 2022; 5:15 p.m., CBS	(2 W) No. 9	vs. (7 W) Michigan State; Second Round	W 85–76	30–6	19 – Banchero	8 – Williams	4 – Tied	Bon Secours Wellness Arena (14,316); Greenville, SC
March 24, 2022; 9:40 p.m., CBS	(2 W) No. 9	vs. (3 W) No. 12 Texas Tech; Sweet Sixteen	W 78–73	31–6	22 – Banchero	8 – Williams	5 – Roach	Chase Center (17,514); San Francisco, CA
March 26, 2022; 8:49 p.m., TBS	(2 W) No. 9	vs. (4 W) No. 17 Arkansas; Elite Eight	W 78–69	32–6	18 – Griffin	12 – Williams	3 – Banchero	Chase Center (17,739); San Francisco, CA
April 2, 2022; 8:49 p.m., TBS	(2 W) No. 9	vs. (8 E) North Carolina; Final Four/Rivalry	L 77–81	32–7	20 – Banchero	10 – Banchero	5 – Roach	Caesars Superdome (70,602); New Orleans, LA
*Non-conference game. ^{#}Rankings from AP Poll. (#) Tournament seedings in parentheses. W=West. All times are in Eastern Time.

== Rankings ==
Ranking movements Legend: ██ Increase in ranking ██ Decrease in ranking ( ) = First-place votes
	Week																			
Poll	Pre	1	2	3	4	5	6	7	8	9	10	11	12	13	14	15	16	17	18	Final
AP	9	7	5	1 (51)	3	2	2	2	2	8	6	9	9	7	9	7	4 (11)	7	9	Not released
Coaches	9	9*	6	1 (19)	3	2 (1)	2	2	2	8	5	7	6	6	5	6	2 (9)	7	10	3

*Coaches did not release a week 1 poll.
