= 2022 MEAC men's basketball tournament =

US collegiate basketball tournament

- Classification: Division I
- Season: 2021–22
- Teams: 8
- Site: Norfolk Scope; Norfolk, Virginia
- Champions: Norfolk State (3rd title)
- Winning coach: Robert Jones (2nd title)
- MVP: Joe Bryant Jr. (Norfolk State)
- Television: ESPN+, ESPN2

2021–22 MEAC men's basketball standings
	Conf.				Overall
Team	W		L	PCT	W		L	PCT
Norfolk State †	12	–	2	.857	24	–	7	.774
Howard	9	–	5	.643	16	–	13	.552
North Carolina Central	8	–	5	.615	16	–	15	.516
Morgan State	7	–	6	.538	13	–	15	.464
South Carolina State	7	–	7	.500	15	–	16	.484
Maryland Eastern Shore	6	–	8	.429	11	–	16	.407
Coppin State	6	–	8	.429	9	–	23	.281
Delaware State	0	–	14	.000	2	–	26	.071
† 2022 MEAC tournament winner

The 2022 MEAC men's basketball tournament was the postseason men's basketball tournament for the 2021–22 season in the Mid-Eastern Athletic Conference (MEAC). The tournament took place during March 9–12, 2022. The tournament winner, Norfolk State, received the conference's automatic invitation to the 2022 NCAA Division I men's basketball tournament.

== Seeds ==
8 eligible teams were seeded by record within the conference, with a tiebreaker system to seed teams with identical conference records.

Seed	School	Conference	Tiebreaker
1	Norfolk State	12–2	
2	Howard	9–5	
3	North Carolina Central	8–5	
4	Morgan State	7–6	
5	South Carolina State	7–7	
6	MD Eastern Shore	6–8	2–0 vs CSU
7	Coppin State	6–8	0–2 vs UMES
8	Delaware State	0–14	

== Schedule ==
Game	Time*	Matchup^{#}	Score	Television
Quarterfinals – Wednesday, March 9, 2022
1	6:00 p.m.	No. 1 Norfolk State vs. No. 8 Delaware State	74–66	ESPN+
2	8:30 p.m.	No. 2 Howard vs. No. 7 Coppin State	57–59	ESPN+
Quarterfinals – Thursday, March 10, 2022
3	6:00 p.m.	No. 4 Morgan State vs. No. 5 South Carolina State	80–77	ESPN+
4	8:30 p.m.	No. 3 North Carolina Central vs. No. 6 Maryland-Eastern Shore	68–56	ESPN+
Semifinals – Friday, March 11, 2022
5	6:00 p.m.	No. 1 Norfolk State vs. No. 4 Morgan State	72-63	ESPN+
6	8:30 p.m.	No. 7 Coppin State vs. No. 3 North Carolina Central	79-73	ESPN+
Championship – Saturday, March 12, 2022
7	1:00 p.m.	No. 1 Norfolk State vs. No. 7 Coppin State	72–57	ESPN2
*Game times in EST. #-Rankings denote tournament seeding.

== Bracket ==
Quarterfinals; March 9–10; ESPN+
1	Norfolk State	74
8	Delaware State	66
4	Morgan State	80
5	South Carolina State	77
2	Howard	57
7	Coppin State	59
3	North Carolina Central	68
6	UMES	56

Semifinals; March 11; ESPN+
1	Norfolk State	72
4	Morgan State	63
7	Coppin State	79
3	North Carolina Central	73

Championship; March 12; ESPN2
1	Norfolk State	72
7	Coppin State	57
