= 2021–22 Norfolk State Spartans men's basketball team =

American college basketball season

2021–22 Norfolk State Spartans men's basketball
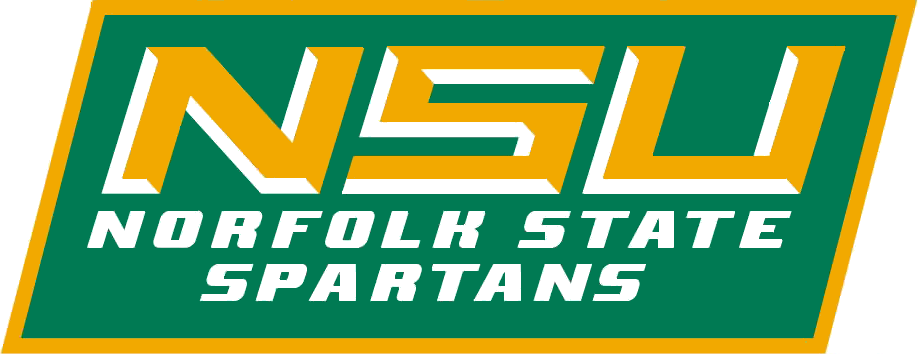

MEAC regular season and tournament champions HBCU Challenge Champions

NCAA tournament, First Round
- Conference: Mid-Eastern Athletic Conference
- Record: 24–7 (12–2 MEAC)
- Head coach: Robert Jones (9th season)
- Associate head coach: Jamal Brown
- Assistant coaches: C.J. Clemons; Leonard Fairley
- Home arena: Joseph G. Echols Memorial Hall

2021–22 MEAC men's basketball standings
	Conf.				Overall
Team	W		L	PCT	W		L	PCT
Norfolk State †	12	–	2	.857	24	–	7	.774
Howard	9	–	5	.643	16	–	13	.552
North Carolina Central	8	–	5	.615	16	–	15	.516
Morgan State	7	–	6	.538	13	–	15	.464
South Carolina State	7	–	7	.500	15	–	16	.484
Maryland Eastern Shore	6	–	8	.429	11	–	16	.407
Coppin State	6	–	8	.429	9	–	23	.281
Delaware State	0	–	14	.000	2	–	26	.071
† 2022 MEAC tournament winner

The 2021–22 Norfolk State Spartans men's basketball team represented Norfolk State University in the 2021–22 NCAA Division I men's basketball season. The Spartans, led by ninth-year head coach Robert Jones, played their home games at the Joseph G. Echols Memorial Hall in Norfolk, Virginia as members of the Mid-Eastern Athletic Conference. They finished the season 24–7, 12–2 in MEAC Play to finish as regular season champions. They defeated Delaware State, Morgan State, and Coppin State to win the MEAC tournament championship. As a result, they received the conference’s automatic bid to the NCAA tournament as the No. 16 seed in the East Region where they lost in the first round to Baylor.

== Previous season ==
In a season limited due to the ongoing COVID-19 pandemic, the Spartans finished the 2020–21 season 17–8, 8–4 in MEAC play to finish in a tie for first place in the Northern Division. They defeated North Carolina Central in the quarterfinals of the MEAC tournament, advancing directly to the championship game after their semifinal opponent, North Carolina A&T, had to withdraw due to COVID-19 protocols. They defeated Morgan State in the championship game. As a result, the received the conference's automatic bid to the NCAA tournament, the school's second ever tournament appearance and their first since 2012. They received a No. 16 seed in the West Region where they defeated Appalachian State in the First Four before losing to overall No. 1 seed Gonzaga in the first round.

== Roster ==
2021–22 Norfolk State Spartans men's basketball team
Players
Coaches

Pos.	#	Name	Height	Weight	Year	Hometown
G	0	Christian Ings	6 ft 2 in (1.88 m)	185 lb (84 kg)	Fr	Philadelphia, PA
F	1	Nyzaiah Chambers	6 ft 7 in (2.01 m)	230 lb (104 kg)	Jr	Chesapeake, VA
G	2	Terrance Jones	6 ft 3 in (1.91 m)	165 lb (75 kg)	So	Trenton, NJ
G	3	Jalen Hawkins	6 ft 2 in (1.88 m)	185 lb (84 kg)	RS Sr	Bronx, NY
G	4	Joe Bryant Jr.	6 ft 1 in (1.85 m)	220 lb (100 kg)	Sr	Norfolk, VA
G/F	5	Tyrese Jenkins	6 ft 6 in (1.98 m)	200 lb (91 kg)	Jr	Richmond, VA
G	13	Daryl Anderson	6 ft 6 in (1.98 m)	180 lb (82 kg)	Jr	North Chesterfield, VA
G	15	Dana Woodley	6 ft 4 in (1.93 m)	170 lb (77 kg)	Fr	Richmond, VA
F	21	Dana Tate Jr.	6 ft 7 in (2.01 m)	220 lb (100 kg)	RS Jr	Boston, MA
G	22	Andre Bottoms	6 ft 0 in (1.83 m)	180 lb (82 kg)	So	Chesapeake, VA
F	30	Kris Bankston	6 ft 8 in (2.03 m)	230 lb (104 kg)	RS Sr	Little Rock, AR
G	31	Cahiem Brown	6 ft 5 in (1.96 m)	200 lb (91 kg)	RS Jr	Brooklyn, NY
F	32	Chris Ford	6 ft 8 in (2.03 m)	235 lb (107 kg)	Sr	Chesterfield, VA
G/F	35	Yoro Sidibe	6 ft 7 in (2.01 m)	220 lb (100 kg)	Jr	Dakar, Senegal

Head coach

- Robert Jones (SUNY New Paltz)

Assistant coach(es)

- Jamal Brown (South Carolina State)
- C.J. Clemons (Norfolk State)
- Leonard Fairley (Norfolk State)

Legend

- (C) Team captain
- (S) Suspended
- (I) Ineligible
- (W) Walk-on
- Injured
- Current redshirt

Roster
Last update: November 21, 2021

== Schedule and results ==
Date time, TV	Rank^{#}	Opponent^{#}	Result	Record	High points	High rebounds	High assists	Site (attendance) city, state
Non-conference regular season
November 9, 2021*; 8:00 pm		Bridgewater	W 79–56	1–0	18 – Bryant	14 – Bankston	3 – Bryant	Joseph G. Echols Memorial Hall (2,703); Norfolk, VA
November 11, 2021*; 7:00 pm		Penn State Wilkes-Barre	W 111–55	2–0	14 – 3 Tied	9 – Jenkins	6 – Bryant	Joseph G. Echols Memorial Hall (1,013); Norfolk, VA
November 13, 2021*; 5:00 pm		vs. Tennessee State; Gateway Invitational	W 66–59	3–0	28 – Bryant	8 – Bryant	1 – 4 Tied	Gateway Center Arena (350); College Park, GA
November 16, 2021*; 7:00 pm		William & Mary	W 91–74	4–0	31 – Ings	6 – 2 Tied	6 – Bryant	Joseph G. Echols Memorial Hall (1,898); Norfolk, VA
November 19, 2021*; 5:30 pm, ESPN3		at Bowling Green	W 90–84	5–0	17 – Jenkins	9 – Bankston	5 – Ings	Stroh Center (1,325); Bowling Green, OH
November 21, 2021*; 12:00 pm, FS1		at Xavier	L 48–88	5–1	12 – Ings	5 – Bankston	2 – 2 Tied	Cintas Center (9,361); Cincinnati, OH
November 23, 2021*; 7:00 pm		Regent	W 95–20	6–1	16 – Hawkins	7 – Bankston	6 – 2 Tied	Joseph G. Echols Memorial Hall (637); Norfolk, VA
November 28, 2021*; 8:00 pm, ESPN2		vs. Hampton; HBCU Challenge Hosted by Chris Paul	W 70–61	7–1	20 – Bryant	6 – Chambers	3 – Brown	Footprint Center (2,103); Phoenix, AZ
November 29, 2021*; 6:00 pm, ESPNU		vs. Grambling State; HBCU Challenge Hosted by Chris Paul	W 68–63	8–1	20 – Bankston	10 – Bankston	5 – Ings	Footprint Center (720); Phoenix, AZ
December 1, 2021*; 7:00 pm, FloHoops		at UNC Wilmington	W 74–69	9–1	17 – Tate	9 – 2 Tied	6 – Ings	Trask Coliseum (3,067); Wilmington, NC
December 4, 2021*; 5:30 pm, ESPN+		at Hampton	L 57–58	9–2	15 – Bryant	8 – Bankston	1 – 1 Tied	Hampton Convocation Center (2,162); Hampton, VA
December 11, 2021*; 7:00 pm, ESPN+		at Wichita State	L 58–71	9–3	22 – Tate	8 – Tate	4 – Ings	Charles Koch Arena (8,742); Wichita, KS
December 19, 2021*; 2:00 pm, ESPN+		at Loyola–Chicago	Canceled due to COVID-19 issues					Joseph J. Gentile Arena; Chicago, IL
December 21, 2021*; 9:00 pm		at New Mexico	L 54–68	9–4	16 – Bryant	8 – Bankston	4 – Bryant	The Pit (8,105); Albuquerque, NM
December 29, 2021*; 7:30 pm, ESPN+		at Campbell	Canceled due to COVID-19 issues					Gore Arena; Buies Creek, NC
MEAC regular season
January 12, 2022; 7:30 pm		Delaware State	W 80–51	10–4 (1–0)	29 – Bryant	9 – Bankston	5 – Bryant	Joseph G. Echols Memorial Hall (515); Norfolk, VA
January 15, 2022; 4:00 pm		at Howard	W 77–74	11–4 (2–0)	24 – Bryant	8 – Jenkins	3 – Bryant	Burr Gymnasium (735); Washington, D.C.
January 17, 2022; 4:00 pm		at Maryland Eastern Shore; Rescheduled from January 8	W 72–58	12–4 (3–0)	25 – Bryant	12 – Brown	6 – Brown	Hytche Athletic Center (350); Princess Anne, MD
January 22, 2022; 6:00 pm		Coppin State	W 84–77	13–4 (4–0)	20 – Hawkins	9 – Hawkins	4 – Hawkins	Joseph G. Echols Memorial Hall (1,036); Norfolk, VA
January 24, 2022; 7:00 pm, ESPNU		Morgan State	W 82–62	14–4 (5–0)	18 – Bryant	8 – Bankston	6 – Bryant	Joseph G. Echols Memorial Hall (1,562); Norfolk, VA
January 29, 2022; 4:00 pm		at South Carolina State	W 87–69	15–4 (6–0)	22 – Bryant	8 – Bankston	4 – Bryant	SHM Memorial Center (612); Orangeburg, SC
January 31, 2022; 7:30 pm, ESPNU		at North Carolina Central	L 67–70	15–5 (6–1)	18 – Bryant	8 – Bryant	4 – Ings	McDougald–McLendon Arena (2,878); Durham, NC
February 12, 2022; 6:00 pm		Maryland Eastern Shore	W 70–63	16–5 (7–1)	16 – Hawkins	9 – Hawkins	4 – Bryant	Joseph G. Echols Memorial Hall (3,278); Norfolk, VA
February 14, 2022; 7:30 pm		at Delaware State	W 69–66	17–5 (8–1)	20 – Tate	7 – Bryant	6 – Bryant	Memorial Hall (600); Dover, DE
February 19, 2022; 4:00 pm		at Coppin State	W 89–59	18–5 (9–1)	29 – Bryant	12 – Bankston	6 – Bryant	Physical Education Complex (545); Baltimore, MD
February 21, 2022; 7:30 pm		at Morgan State	L 74–85	18–6 (9–2)	20 – Bryant	8 – Tate	5 – Hawkins	Talmadge L. Hill Field House (2,891); Baltimore, MD
February 26, 2022; 6:00 pm		South Carolina State	W 63–59	19–6 (10–2)	15 – Tate	9 – Tate	3 – Bryant	Joseph G. Echols Memorial Hall (3,997); Norfolk, VA
February 28, 2022; 7:30 pm		North Carolina Central	W 75–46	20–6 (11–2)	21 – Bankston	11 – Bankston	7 – Byrant	Joseph G. Echols Memorial Hall (2,646); Norfolk, VA
March 3, 2022; 7:30 pm		Howard	W 83–61	21–6 (12–2)	27 – Bryant	7 – Chambers	3 – Hawkins	Joseph G. Echols Memorial Hall (2,897); Norfolk, VA
MEAC tournament
March 9, 2022; 6:00 pm, ESPN+	(1)	vs. (8) Delaware State; Quarterfinals	W 74–66	22–6	17 – Hawkins	7 – Tied	6 – Ings	Norfolk Scope; Norfolk, VA
March 11, 2022; 6:00 pm, ESPN+	(1)	vs. (4) Morgan State; Semifinals	W 72–63	23–6	19 – Tied	11 – Tate	4 – Bryant Jr.	Norfolk Scope; Norfolk, VA
March 12, 2022; 1:00 pm, ESPN2	(1)	vs. (7) Coppin State; Championship	W 72–57	24–6	23 – Bryant Jr.	8 – Tied	3 – Bankston	Norfolk Scope; Norfolk, VA
NCAA tournament
March 17, 2022; 2:00 pm, TBS	(16 E)	vs. (1 E) No. 4 Baylor; First Round	L 49–85	24–7	15 – Bryant	5 – Tied	3 – Bankston	Dickies Arena; Fort Worth, TX
*Non-conference game. ^{#}Rankings from AP Poll. (#) Tournament seedings in parentheses. All times are in Eastern.
