= Robert Jones (basketball, born 1979) =

American basketball coach (born 1979)

Current position
- Title: Head coach
- Team: Norfolk State
- Conference: MEAC
- Record: 253–179 (.586)

Biographical details
- Born: June 26, 1979 (age 47); South Jamaica, Queens, New York, U.S.

Playing career
- 1997–2001: New Paltz

Coaching career (HC unless noted)
- 2001–2002: Bard (assistant)
- 2003–2004: New Paltz (assistant)
- 2004–2005: St. Mary's HS (NY) (assistant)
- 2005–2007: St. Mary's HS (NY)
- 2007–2013: Norfolk State (associate head coach)
- 2013–2014: Norfolk State (interim HC)
- 2014–present: Norfolk State

Head coaching record
- Overall: 253–179 (.586) (college); 32–15 (.681) (high school)
- Tournaments: 1–3 (NCAA Division I); 1–1 (NIT); 2–4 (CIT)

Accomplishments and honors

Championships
- CIT (2024); 3 MEAC tournament (2021, 2022, 2025); 4 MEAC regular season (2019, 2022, 2024, 2025); MEAC Northern Division (2021)

Awards
- Hugh Durham Award (2022); Skip Prosser Man of the Year Award (2019); 3× MEAC Coach of the Year (2019, 2022, 2024)

Robert Jones (born June 26, 1979) is an American basketball coach, currently the head men's basketball coach at Norfolk State University. He was named interim head coach on April 15, 2013, and was named full head coach in February 2014. He grew up in South Jamaica, Queens, NY. In 2019, he was awarded the Skip Prosser Man of the Year Award.

== Coaching career ==
In 2023-24, Jones led Norfolk State to its first non-conference postseason title in their Division 1 history, as the Spartans secured the CollegeInsider.com (CIT) Tournament championship. Jones led Norfolk State to a 24-11 overall record, earning his 3rd MEAC Coach of the Year award. The Spartans won the 2023-24 MEAC regular season title with an 11-3 conference record. The regular season title was the 4th of Jones' tenure.

In 2022-23, Jones guided Norfolk State to a 22-11 record. He led the Spartans to the 2023 MEAC Championship game. Jones was recognized as a finalist for the 2022-23 Ben Jobe National Coach of the Year award and Skip Prosser Man of the Year award.

The 2021-22 Norfolk State season was the program's most successful year in a decade. The Spartans finished the season with a 24-7 overall record, their most wins in a season since 2011-12. The Spartans won both the MEAC regular season and postseason championships. By winning the MEAC postseason tournament, the Spartans secured a spot in the 2022 NCAA Tournament. Jones took home the MEAC Tournament's Most Outstanding Coach award and earned his second MEAC Coach of the Year honor.

NSU started the MEAC season with a 9–1 record, which was the best start in MEAC history and the second best in HBCU history.

The historic start came off of Norfolk State's second-ever MEAC title and an NCAA Tournament berth, where the Spartans knocked off Appalachian State in the NCAA Tournament First Four. NSU finished the season 17–8.

Entering the 2021–22 season, Jones had led NSU to a .742 (92–32) win percentage in MEAC play, which was fifth in the nation among coaches with at least 100 games coached. Jones led Norfolk State to a first or second finish in the MEAC in six of his first eight seasons.

Under Jones, NSU has set Division 1 program records for best scoring margin (four times), rebounds per game, fewest turnovers per game, best turnover margin, 3-pointers, 3-point field goal attempts, and 3-point field goal percentage (three times each); rebounds, points, field goals, field goal attempts, and fewest losses (all twice); and steals, assists, defensive field goal percentage, best rebounding margin, free throws made and free throw percentage (all once). In 2022-23, NSU averaged 75.8 points per game, the program’s most since 1999-2000.

Jones was named the interim head coach on April 15, 2013, following Anthony Evans’ departure. In February 2014, the interim tag was removed, and Jones was named the full-time head coach. Jones had been an assistant coach the previous six seasons, including the associate head coach during the 2012–13 season.

Before landing an assistant coaching position at Norfolk State, Jones was the head varsity boys basketball coach at Manhasset (NY) St. Mary's, where his teams compiled a 32–15 record in New York's highest classification (Class AA). As the head coach, Jones sent three players to Division I institutions. Before landing the head coaching position, Jones was an assistant during the 2004–05 season, and coached 2009 Cleveland Cavaliers draftee Danny Green and former WVU star and Los Angeles Lakers Devin Ebanks.

Before becoming a high school coach, Jones was an assistant at a pair of D-III schools — Bard College and the State University of New York at New Paltz.

Jones was a four-year letterwinner from 1997–2001 at New Paltz. Jones was a three-time All-SUNYAC selection and an honorable mention D-III All-American in 2000. Jones ranks No. 9 all-time in school history in scoring with 1,321 points, first in blocks with 140 and second in rebounds with 875.

== Head coaching record ==
=== College ===
Record table
Season	Team	Overall	Conference	Standing	Postseason
Norfolk State Spartans (Mid-Eastern Athletic Conference) (2013–present)
2013–14	Norfolk State	19–15	11–5	T–2nd	CIT first round
2014–15	Norfolk State	20–14	12–4	2nd	CIT first round
2015–16	Norfolk State	17–17	12–4	T–2nd	CIT first round
2016–17	Norfolk State	17–17	12–4	2nd	CIT first round
2017–18	Norfolk State	14–19	11–5	T–2nd	
2018–19	Norfolk State	22–14	14–2	1st	NIT second round
2019–20	Norfolk State	16–15	12–4	T–2nd	
2020–21	Norfolk State	17–8	8–4	T–1st (Northern)	NCAA Division I Round of 64
2021–22	Norfolk State	24–7	12–2	1st	NCAA Division I Round of 64
2022–23	Norfolk State	22–11	9–5	3rd	
2023–24	Norfolk State	24–11	11–3	1st	CIT Champions
2024–25	Norfolk State	24–11	11–3	T–1st	NCAA Division I Round of 64
2025–26	Norfolk State	15–17	8–6	T–3rd	
2026–27	Norfolk State	2–3	0–0		
Norfolk State:		253–179 (.586)	143–51 (.737)		
Total:		253–179 (.586)			
National champion Postseason invitational champion Conference regular season champion Conference regular season and conference tournament champion Division regular season champion Division regular season and conference tournament champion Conference tournament champion
