= 2021–22 Iona Gaels men's basketball team =

American college basketball season

2021–22 Iona Gaels men's basketball
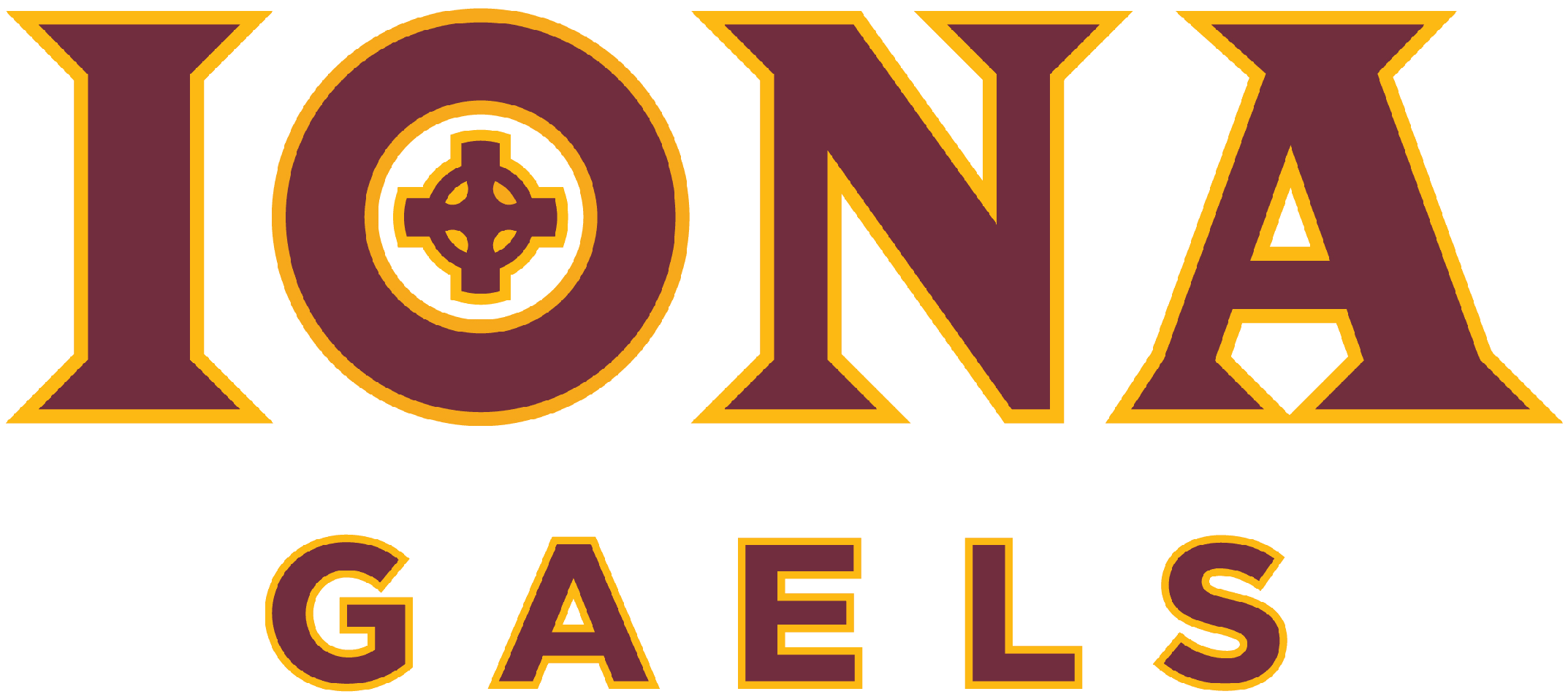

MAAC regular season champions

NIT, First Round
- Conference: Metro Atlantic Athletic Conference
- Record: 25–8 (17–3 MAAC)
- Head coach: Rick Pitino (2nd season)
- Assistant coaches: Tom Abatemarco; Casey Stanley; Ricky Johns
- Home arena: Hynes Athletic Center

2021–22 MAAC men's basketball standings
	Conf.				Overall
Team	W		L	PCT	W		L	PCT
Iona	17	–	3	.850	25	–	8	.758
Saint Peter's †	14	–	6	.700	22	–	12	.647
Siena	12	–	8	.600	15	–	14	.517
Monmouth	11	–	9	.550	21	–	13	.618
Niagara	9	–	11	.450	14	–	16	.467
Marist	9	–	11	.450	14	–	16	.467
Fairfield	8	–	12	.400	15	–	18	.455
Manhattan	8	–	12	.400	15	–	15	.500
Rider	8	–	12	.400	14	–	19	.424
Canisius	7	–	13	.350	11	–	21	.344
Quinnipiac	7	–	13	.350	14	–	17	.452
† 2022 MAAC tournament winner

The 2021–22 Iona Gaels men's basketball team represented Iona College in the 2021–22 NCAA Division I men's basketball season. The Gaels, led by second-year head coach Rick Pitino, played their home games at the Hynes Athletic Center in New Rochelle, New York as members of the Metro Atlantic Athletic Conference. They finished the season 25–8, 17–3 in MAAC Play to finish as regular season champions. They were upset in the quarterfinals of the MAAC tournament by Rider. As a No. 1 seed who failed to win their conference tournament, they received an automatic bid to the National Invitation Tournament where they lost in the first round to Florida.

== Previous season ==
In a season limited due to the ongoing COVID-19 pandemic, the Gaels finished the season 12–6, 6–3 in MAAC play to finish in a tie for ninth place. As the No. 9 seed in the MAAC tournament, they defeated Quinnipiac, Siena, and Niagara to advance to the tournament championship game. There they defeated Fairfield to win the tournament championship. As a result, they received the conference's automatic bid to the NCAA tournament as the No. 15 seed in the East region, losing in the first round to Alabama.

== Roster ==
2021–22 Iona Gaels men's basketball team
Players
Coaches

Pos.	#	Name	Height	Weight	Year	Hometown
G	0	Berrick JeanLouis	6 ft 4 in (1.93 m)	200 lb (91 kg)	Sr	Lehigh Acres, Florida
G	1	Colton Cashaw	6 ft 1 in (1.85 m)	180 lb (82 kg)	GS	Charlotte, North Carolina
G	2	Elijah Joiner	6 ft 3 in (1.91 m)	205 lb (93 kg)	GS	Chicago, Illinois
G	3	Ryan Myers	6 ft 0 in (1.83 m)	185 lb (84 kg)	So	Brooklyn, New York
G	4	Parker Weiss	6 ft 2 in (1.88 m)	175 lb (79 kg)	Jr	Naples, Florida
G	5	Joshua Duach	6 ft 5 in (1.96 m)	190 lb (86 kg)	Fr	Melbourne, Australia
F	10	Robert Brown	6 ft 8 in (2.03 m)	240 lb (109 kg)	Sr	Dallas, Texas
F	11	Quinn Slazinski	6 ft 9 in (2.06 m)	215 lb (98 kg)	Jr	Houston, Texas
G	13	Walter Clayton Jr.	6 ft 2 in (1.88 m)	195 lb (88 kg)	Fr	Lake Wales, Florida
F	22	Jordan Wildy	6 ft 9 in (2.06 m)	195 lb (88 kg)	Fr	Rock Hill, South Carolina
F	23	Nelly Junior Joseph	6 ft 9 in (2.06 m)	240 lb (109 kg)	So	Benin City, Nigeria
F	24	Dylan van Eyck	6 ft 8 in (2.03 m)	220 lb (100 kg)	GS	Boskoop, Netherlands
G	25	Tyson Jolly	6 ft 4 in (1.93 m)	205 lb (93 kg)	GS	Muskogee, Oklahoma
G	44	James Carey	5 ft 10 in (1.78 m)	160 lb (73 kg)	Jr	Pelham, New York
F	50	Trey James	6 ft 9 in (2.06 m)	235 lb (107 kg)	Fr	Inez, Kentucky
F	55	Osborn Shema	7 ft 0 in (2.13 m)	220 lb (100 kg)	Jr	Kanombe, Rwanda

Head coach

- Rick Pitino (UMass)

Assistant coach(es)

- Tom Abatemarco (Dowling)
- Casey Stanley (Iona)
- Ricky Johns (Monroe)

Legend

- (C) Team captain
- (S) Suspended
- (I) Ineligible
- (W) Walk-on
- Injured
- Current redshirt

Roster
Last update: January 28, 2022

== Schedule and results ==
Date time, TV	Rank^{#}	Opponent^{#}	Result	Record	Site (attendance) city, state
Regular season
November 9, 2021*; 7:00 pm, ESPN3		Appalachian State	W 65–53	1–0	Hynes Athletic Center (2,319); New Rochelle, NY
November 13, 2021*; 1:00 pm, ESPN3		Harvard	W 90–87 ^{OT}	2–0	Hynes Athletic Center (2,259); New Rochelle, NY
November 16, 2021*; 7:00 pm, ESPN3		Hofstra	W 82–74	3–0	Hynes Athletic Center (2,172); New Rochelle, NY
November 19, 2021*; 5:00 pm, ESPNU		vs. Liberty; MAAC-ASUN Challenge	W 54–50	4–0	HP Field House (367); Lake Buena Vista, FL
November 20, 2021*; 8:30 pm, ESPN3		vs. North Alabama; MAAC-ASUN Challenge	W 81–65	5–0	HP Field House (398); Lake Buena Vista, FL
November 25, 2021*; 5:00 pm, ESPN2		vs. No. 10 Alabama; ESPN Events Invitational quarterfinal	W 72–68	6–0	HP Field House (2,749); Lake Buena Vista, FL
November 26, 2021*; 6:30 pm, ESPNU		vs. Belmont; ESPN Events Invitational semifinal	L 65–72	6–1	HP Field House (3,020); Lake Buena Vista, FL
November 28, 2021*; 1:00 pm, ESPN		vs. No. 4 Kansas; ESPN Events Invitational 3rd place	L 83–96	6–2	HP Field House (3,252); Lake Buena Vista, FL
December 1, 2021; 7:00 pm, ESPN+		at Marist	W 78–71	7–2 (1–0)	McCann Arena (1,232); Poughkeepsie, NY
December 3, 2021; 7:00 pm, ESPN3		Rider	W 80–54	8–2 (2–0)	Hynes Athletic Center (2,257); New Rochelle, NY
December 12, 2021*; 7:00 pm, FloSports		vs. Yale; Basketball Hall of Fame Invitational	W 91–77	9–2	Barclays Center (7,124); Brooklyn, NY
December 18, 2021*; 3:00 pm, FS2		vs. No. 16 Seton Hall; Gotham Classic	Canceled due to COVID-19 issues at Seton Hall		Madison Square Garden; New York, NY
December 21, 2021*; 7:30 pm, ESPN3		vs. Delaware	W 83–72	10–2	UBS Arena (823); Belmont Park, NY
January 2, 2022; 2:00 pm, ESPN+		Marist	W 69–66	11–2 (3–0)	Hynes Athletic Center (1,269); New Rochelle, NY
January 8, 2022*; 8:00 pm, ESPN+		at Saint Louis	L 67–68	11–3	Chaifetz Arena (4,107); St. Louis, MO
January 11, 2022; 2:00 pm, ESPN3		at Fairfield; Rescheduled from January 2	W 80–76	12–3 (4–0)	Webster Bank Arena (1,647); Bridgeport, CT
January 14, 2022; 7:00 pm, ESPNU		Manhattan	W 88–76	13–3 (5–0)	Hynes Athletic Center (2,594); New Rochelle, NY
January 16, 2022; 1:00 pm, ESPN3		Niagara	W 78–55	14–3 (6–0)	Hynes Athletic Center (1,623); New Rochelle, NY
January 18, 2022; 7:00 pm, ESPN+		at Monmouth; Rescheduled from January 9	W 86–85 ^{OT}	15–3 (7–0)	OceanFirst Bank Center (1,874); West Long Branch, NJ
January 23, 2022; 2:00 pm, ESPN3		at Quinnipiac	W 76–61	16–3 (8–0)	People's United Center (1,348); Hamden, CT
January 25, 2022; 7:00 pm, ESPN3		Siena; Rescheduled from December 31	W 74–57	17–3 (9–0)	Hynes Athletic Center (2,087); New Rochelle, NY
January 30, 2022; 1:00 pm, ESPN3		Saint Peter's	W 85–77	18–3 (10–0)	Hynes Athletic Center (2,318); New Rochelle, NY
February 4, 2022; 7:00 pm, ESPN3		at Canisius	W 70–62	19–3 (11–0)	Koessler Athletic Center (905); Buffalo, NY
February 6, 2022; 1:00 pm, ESPN+		at Niagara	L 71–80	19–4 (11–1)	Gallagher Center (1,112); Lewiston, NY
February 11, 2022; 7:00 pm, ESPNU		at Siena	L 64–70	19–5 (11–2)	MVP Arena (6,383); Albany, NY
February 13, 2022; 1:00 pm, ESPN3		Monmouth	W 70–62	20–5 (12–2)	Hynes Athletic Center (2,056); New Rochelle, NY
February 15, 2022; 7:00 pm, ESPN+		at Saint Peter's; Rescheduled from January 7	W 70–61	21–5 (13–2)	Run Baby Run Arena (695); Jersey City, NJ
February 20, 2022; 1:00 pm, ESPN3		Fairfield	W 76–58	22–5 (14–2)	Hynes Athletic Center (2,594); New Rochelle, NY
February 25, 2022; 7:00 pm, ESPN+		Canisius	W 72–65	23–5 (15–2)	Hynes Athletic Center (2,207); New Rochelle, NY
February 27, 2022; 2:00 pm, ESPN+		at Rider	W 67–61	24–5 (16–2)	Alumni Gymnasium (1,650); Lawrenceville, NJ
March 3, 2022; 7:00 pm, ESPN+		at Manhattan	L 72–74	24–6 (16–3)	Draddy Gymnasium (1,910); Riverdale, NY
March 5, 2022; 1:00 pm, ESPN3		Quinnipiac	W 79–61	25–6 (17–3)	Hynes Athletic Center (2,594); New Rochelle, NY
2022 MAAC tournament
March 9, 2022; 7:00 pm, ESPN+	(1)	vs. (9) Rider; Quarterfinals	L 71–72	25–7	Boardwalk Hall; Atlantic City, NJ
NIT tournament
March 16, 2022; 9:00 pm, ESPN2		at (3) Florida; First Round – Dayton Bracket	L 74–79	25–8	O'Connell Center (3,023); Gainesville, FL
*Non-conference game. ^{#}Rankings from AP Poll. (#) Tournament seedings in parentheses. All times are in Eastern.

== Rankings ==
Ranking movements Legend: ██ Increase in ranking ██ Decrease in ranking — = Not ranked RV = Received votes
	Week																			
Poll	Pre	1	2	3	4	5	6	7	8	9	10	11	12	13	14	15	16	17	18	Final
AP	—	—*	—	—	RV	—	—	—	—	—	—	—	RV	RV	—	—	—	—	—	—
Coaches	—	—*	—	—	—	—	—	—	—	—	—	—	—	—	—	—	—	—	—	—

*No poll released
