= 2021–22 Rider Broncs men's basketball team =

American college basketball season

2021–22 Rider Broncs men's basketball
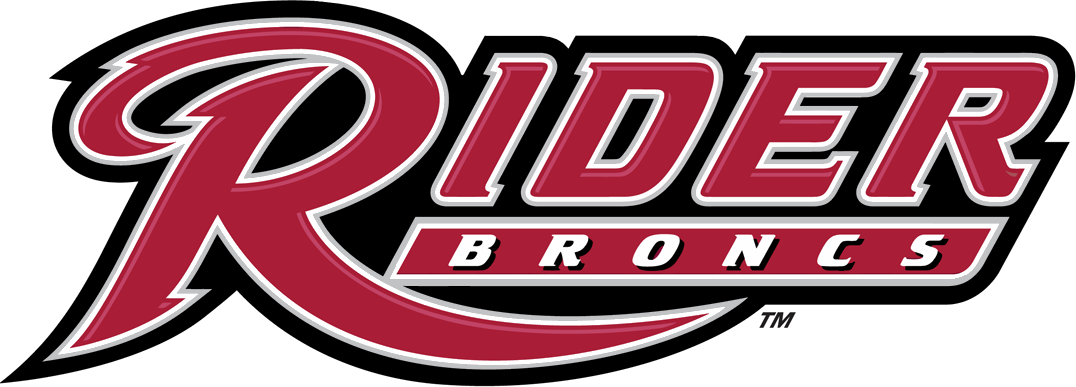
- Conference: Metro Atlantic Athletic Conference
- Record: 14–19 (8–12 MAAC)
- Head coach: Kevin Baggett (10th season)
- Associate head coach: Dino Presley
- Assistant coaches: Kim Waiters; Geoff Arnold
- Home arena: Alumni Gymnasium

2021–22 MAAC men's basketball standings
	Conf.				Overall
Team	W		L	PCT	W		L	PCT
Iona	17	–	3	.850	25	–	8	.758
Saint Peter's †	14	–	6	.700	22	–	12	.647
Siena	12	–	8	.600	15	–	14	.517
Monmouth	11	–	9	.550	21	–	13	.618
Niagara	9	–	11	.450	14	–	16	.467
Marist	9	–	11	.450	14	–	16	.467
Fairfield	8	–	12	.400	15	–	18	.455
Manhattan	8	–	12	.400	15	–	15	.500
Rider	8	–	12	.400	14	–	19	.424
Canisius	7	–	13	.350	11	–	21	.344
Quinnipiac	7	–	13	.350	14	–	17	.452
† 2022 MAAC tournament winner

The 2021–22 Rider Broncs men's basketball team represented Rider University in the 2021–22 NCAA Division I men's basketball season. The Broncs, led by tenth-year head coach Kevin Baggett, played their home games at the Alumni Gymnasium in Lawrenceville, New Jersey as members of the Metro Atlantic Athletic Conference.

== Previous season ==
The Broncs finished the 2020–21 season 6–17 overall, 5–13 in MAAC play to finish in last place. They lost to Saint Peter's in the MAAC tournament quarterfinals.

== Roster ==
2021–22 Rider Broncs men's basketball team
Players
Coaches

Pos.	#	Name	Height	Weight	Year	Previous school	Hometown
G	0	Sedrick Altman	6 ft 2 in (1.88 m)	180 lb (82 kg)	Jr	Colony High School	Rialto, California
G	2	Allen Powell	6 ft 2 in (1.88 m)	165 lb (75 kg)	Jr	La Salle College High School	Philadelphia, Pennsylvania
G	3	Corey McKeithan	6 ft 2 in (1.88 m)	175 lb (79 kg)	So	Windsor High School	Windsor, Connecticut
F	5	Mervin James	6 ft 7 in (2.01 m)	215 lb (98 kg)	Jr	North Alabama	Saint Thomas, U.S. Virgin Islands
F	10	Ajiri Ogemuno-Johnson	6 ft 8 in (2.03 m)	210 lb (95 kg)	Sr	Monsignor Bonner High School	Delta State, Nigeria
F	11	Tyrel Bladen	6 ft 10 in (2.08 m)	230 lb (104 kg)	RS Jr	Coatesville High School	Coatesville, Pennsylvania
G	12	Jordan Smalls	6 ft 7 in (2.01 m)	185 lb (84 kg)	So	Eagle's Landing Christian Academy	Jonesboro, Georgia
G	13	Jaelen McGlone	6 ft 4 in (1.93 m)	205 lb (93 kg)	So	Cheltenham High School	Cheltenham, Pennsylvania
G/F	14	Dimencio Vaughn	6 ft 5 in (1.96 m)	220 lb (100 kg)	GS	Ole Miss	New York, New York
G	15	Jeremiah Pope	6 ft 4 in (1.93 m)	180 lb (82 kg)	Sr	Brunswick Community College	Clinton, North Carolina
G	20	R.J. Weise	6 ft 0 in (1.83 m)	185 lb (84 kg)	So	Allentown High School	Allentown, New Jersey
F	35	Nehemiah Benson	6 ft 7 in (2.01 m)	215 lb (98 kg)	So	Lutheran High School East	Streetsboro, Ohio
G	55	Dwight Murray, Jr.	6 ft 0 in (1.83 m)	180 lb (82 kg)	Sr	Incarnate Word	Austell, Georgia

Head coach

- Kevin Baggett (Saint Joseph's)

Assistant coach(es)

- Dino Presley (Kutztown)
- Kim Waiters (Robert Morris)
- Geoff Arnold (Saint Joseph's)

Legend

- (C) Team captain
- (S) Suspended
- (I) Ineligible
- (W) Walk-on
- Injured
- Current redshirt

Roster
Last update: January 13, 2022

== Schedule and results ==
Date time, TV	Rank^{#}	Opponent^{#}	Result	Record	Site (attendance) city, state
Exhibition
November 6, 2021*; 4:00 pm		Kutztown	W 78–76	–	Alumni Gymnasium (1,650); Lawrenceville, NJ
Regular season
November 9, 2021*; 7:00 pm, ESPN+		at Duquesne	L 61–73	0–1	UPMC Cooper Fieldhouse (2,276); Pittsburgh, PA
November 12, 2021*; 7:00 pm, ESPN3		Coppin State	W 81–69	1–1	Alumni Gymnasium (1,650); Lawrenceville, NJ
November 14, 2021*; 5:00 pm, ESPN3		Delaware State	W 63–53	2–1	Alumni Gymnasium (1,504); Lawrenceville, NJ
November 17, 2021*; 7:00 pm, ESPN+		at Bucknell	L 74–81	2–2	Sojka Pavilion (1,176); Lewisburg, PA
November 20, 2021*; 2:00 pm, ESPN3		at Buffalo; Cancun Challenge	L 65–87	2–3	Alumni Arena (2,338); Amherst, NY
November 23, 2021*; 12:30 pm, FloHoops		vs. Middle Tennessee; Cancun Challenge	L 54–60	2–4	Hard Rock Hotel Riviera (111); Riviera Maya, Mexico
November 24, 2021*; 12:30 pm, FloHoops		vs. Bucknell; Cancun Challenge	W 85–79	3–4	Hard Rock Hotel Riviera (103); Riviera Maya, Mexico
November 28, 2021*; 2:00 pm, SECN+		at South Carolina	L 58–65	3–5	Colonial Life Arena (8,027); Columbia, SC
November 30, 2021*; 7:30 pm, SECN+		at Ole Miss	L 51–75	3–6	SJB Pavilion (5,537); Oxford, MS
December 3, 2021; 7:00 pm, ESPN3		at Iona	L 54–80	3–7 (0–1)	Hynes Athletic Center (2,257); New Rochelle, NY
December 5, 2021; 2:00 pm, ESPN+		Marist	L 67–79	3–8 (0–2)	Alumni Gymnasium (2,257); Lawrenceville, NJ
December 18, 2021; 5:00 pm, BTN		at Rutgers	Canceled due to COVID-19 protocols		Jersey Mike's Arena; Piscataway, NJ
December 20, 2021; 7:00 pm, ESPN+		Gwynedd Mercy	W 82–57	4–8	Alumni Gymnasium (1,023); Lawrenceville, NJ
January 9, 2022; 2:00 pm, ESPN+		at Marist	W 79–75	5–8 (1–2)	McCann Arena (806); Poughkeepsie, NY
January 14, 2022; 7:00 pm, ESPN3		Quinnipiac	L 70–77 ^{OT}	5–9 (1–3)	Alumni Gymnasium (1,428); Lawrenceville, NJ
January 16, 2022; 2:00 pm, ESPN3		Saint Peter's	L 51–58	5–10 (1–4)	Alumni Gymnasium (1,068); Lawrenceville, NJ
January 19, 2022; 7:00 pm, ESPN3		at Quinnipiac	L 67–73	5–11 (1–5)	People's United Center (231); Hamden, CT
January 21, 2022; 7:00 pm, ESPN3		at Canisius	L 69–70	5–12 (1–6)	Koessler Athletic Center (969); Buffalo, NY
January 23, 2022; 1:00 pm, ESPN3		at Niagara	W 70–67	6–12 (2–6)	Gallagher Center (973); Lewiston, NY
January 28, 2022; 7:00 pm, ESPN3		Fairfield	L 65–76	6–13 (2–7)	Alumni Gymnasium (1,362); Lawrenceville, NJ
January 30, 2022; 2:00 pm, ESPN3		Canisius	W 70–62	7–13 (3–7)	Alumni Gymnasium (1,312); Lawrenceville, NJ
February 4, 2022; 7:00 pm, ESPN+		at Siena	W 74–60	8–13 (4–7)	MVP Arena (5,710); Albany, NY
February 8, 2022; 7:00 pm, ESPN3		at Manhattan	W 76–67	9–13 (5–7)	Alumni Gymnasium (1,289); Lawrenceville, NJ
February 11, 2022; 7:00 pm, ESPN+		at Saint Peter's	W 58–49	10–13 (6–7)	Run Baby Run Arena (577); Jersey City, NJ
February 13, 2022; 1:00 pm, ESPN3		Siena	L 75–76 ^{OT}	10–14 (6–8)	Alumni Gymnasium (1,650); Lawrenceville, NJ
February 18, 2022; 7:00 pm, ESPN3		at Monmouth	L 58–60	10–15 (6–9)	OceanFirst Bank Center (1,728); West Long Branch, NJ
February 20, 2022; 2:00 pm, ESPN+		at Manhattan	L 78–84 ^{OT}	10–16 (6–10)	Draddy Gymnasium (717); Riverdale, NY
February 25, 2022; 7:00 pm, ESPN+		Niagara	W 70–68	11–16 (7–10)	Alumni Gymnasium (1,650); Lawrenceville, NJ
February 27, 2022; 2:00 pm, ESPN+		Iona	L 61–67	11–17 (7–11)	Alumni Gymnasium (1,650); Lawrenceville, NJ
March 3, 2022; 7:30 pm, ESPN+		at Fairfield	L 59–65	11–18 (7–12)	Webster Bank Arena (1,411); Bridgeport, CT
March 5, 2022; 4:00 pm, ESPN+		Monmouth	W 74–65	12–18 (8–12)	Alumni Gymnasium (1,650); Lawrenceville, NJ
MAAC tournament
March 8, 2022; 5:00 p.m., ESPN+	(9)	vs. (8) Manhattan; First Round	W 79–67	13–18	Boardwalk Hall; Atlantic City, NJ
March 9, 2022; 7:00 p.m., ESPN+	(9)	vs. (1) Iona; Quarterfinals	W 71–70	14–18	Boardwalk Hall; Atlantic City, NJ
March 11, 2022; 6:00 p.m., ESPNews & ESPN+	(9)	vs. (4) Monmouth; Semifinals	L 68–72	14–19	Boardwalk Hall; Atlantic City, NJ
*Non-conference game. ^{#}Rankings from AP Poll. (#) Tournament seedings in parentheses. All times are in Eastern.
