= 2021–22 Delaware State Hornets men's basketball team =

American college basketball season

2021–22 Delaware State Hornets men's basketball
- Conference: Mid-Eastern Athletic Conference
- Record: 2–26 (0–14 MEAC)
- Head coach: Stan Waterman (1st season)
- Associate head coach: Horace Owens
- Assistant coaches: Vernon Dupree, Jr.; Shahid Perkins
- Home arena: Memorial Hall

2021–22 MEAC men's basketball standings
	Conf.				Overall
Team	W		L	PCT	W		L	PCT
Norfolk State †	12	–	2	.857	24	–	7	.774
Howard	9	–	5	.643	16	–	13	.552
North Carolina Central	8	–	5	.615	16	–	15	.516
Morgan State	7	–	6	.538	13	–	15	.464
South Carolina State	7	–	7	.500	15	–	16	.484
Maryland Eastern Shore	6	–	8	.429	11	–	16	.407
Coppin State	6	–	8	.429	9	–	23	.281
Delaware State	0	–	14	.000	2	–	26	.071
† 2022 MEAC tournament winner

The 2021–22 Delaware State Hornets men's basketball team represented Delaware State University in the 2021–22 NCAA Division I men's basketball season. The Hornets, led by first-year head coach Stan Waterman, played their home games at Memorial Hall in Dover, Delaware as members of the Mid-Eastern Athletic Conference.

== Previous season ==
In a season limited due to the ongoing COVID-19 pandemic, the Hornets finished the 2020–21 season 3–16, 1–11 in MEAC play to finish in fourth place in the Northern division. They failed to qualify for the MEAC tournament.

On April 1, 2021, the school fired head coach Eric Skeeters after three seasons at Delaware State. On June 3, the school named high school coach Stan Waterman the team's new head coach.

== Roster ==
2021–22 Delaware State Hornets men's basketball team
Players
Coaches

Pos.	#	Name	Height	Weight	Year	Hometown
F	0	Christopher Smith	6 ft 8 in (2.03 m)	230 lb (104 kg)	Fr	Upper Marlboro, MD
F	1	D'Marco Baucum	6 ft 6 in (1.98 m)	225 lb (102 kg)	RS So	Washington, D.C.
G	2	Corey Perkins	6 ft 2 in (1.88 m)	180 lb (82 kg)	Fr	Wilmington, DE
G	3	Martez Robinson	6 ft 2 in (1.88 m)	180 lb (82 kg)	So	Owings Mills, MD
G	4	Dominik Fragala	6 ft 0 in (1.83 m)	170 lb (77 kg)	Jr	Chantilly, VA
G	5	John Stansbury	6 ft 3 in (1.91 m)	195 lb (88 kg)	So	New Castle, DE
G	10	Ronald Lucas	6 ft 6 in (1.98 m)	200 lb (91 kg)	Jr	Baltimore, MD
G	11	Khyrie Staten	6 ft 1 in (1.85 m)	160 lb (73 kg)	Fr	Baltimore, MD
G	12	Israel Palmer	6 ft 4 in (1.93 m)	—	Fr	Atlanta, GA
F	13	Fahim Jenneto	6 ft 7 in (2.01 m)	230 lb (104 kg)	So	Ajax, ON
G/F	15	Ricky Deadwyler III	6 ft 4 in (1.93 m)	205 lb (93 kg)	Fr	Wilmington, DE
C	21	Chris Sodom	7 ft 3 in (2.21 m)	230 lb (104 kg)	Jr	Washington, D.C.
G	23	Myles Carter	6 ft 1 in (1.85 m)	190 lb (86 kg)	RS Sr	Philadelphia, PA
F/C	24	Zach Kent	6 ft 10 in (2.08 m)	230 lb (104 kg)	So	Magnolia, DE
G	32	Avery Richardson	5 ft 9 in (1.75 m)	160 lb (73 kg)	Fr	Bear, DE

Head coach

- Stan Waterman (Delaware)

Assistant coach(es)

- Horace Owens (Rhode Island)
- Vernon Dupree, Jr. (Wilmington)
- Shahid Perkins (East Tennessee State)

Legend

- (C) Team captain
- (S) Suspended
- (I) Ineligible
- (W) Walk-on
- Injured
- Current redshirt

Roster
Last update: November 23, 2021

== Schedule and results ==
Date time, TV	Rank^{#}	Opponent^{#}	Result	Record	Site (attendance) city, state
Exhibition
November 6, 2021*; 2:00 pm		Virginia–Lynchburg	W 83–56	–	Memorial Hall (750); Dover, DE
Non-conference regular season
November 9, 2021*; 7:00 pm		Cairn	W 80–41	1–0	Memorial Hall (1,000); Dover, DE
November 12, 2021*; 7:00 pm		Salisbury	L 78–91	1–1	Memorial Hall (987); Dover, DE
November 14, 2021*; 5:00 pm, ESPN3		at Rider	L 53–63	1–2	Alumni Gymnasium (1,504); Lawrenceville, NJ
November 16, 2021*; 7:00 pm		Regent	W 84–30	2–2	Memorial Hall (1,100); Dover, DE
November 20, 2021*; 4:00 pm		UNC Wilmington	L 63–67	2–3	Memorial Hall (485); Dover, DE
November 27, 2021*; 2:00 pm		at LIU	L 65–99	2–4	Steinberg Wellness Center (375); Brooklyn, NY
December 2, 2021*; 7:00 pm		Delaware; Route 1 Rivalry	L 48–59	2–5	Memorial Hall (1,200); Dover, DE
December 4, 2021*; 3:00 pm, ESPN+		at Longwood	L 58–78	2–6	Willett Hall (1,265); Farmville, VA
December 6, 2021*; 7:00 pm, ESPN+		at Liberty	L 60–96	2–7	Liberty Arena; Lynchburg, VA
December 11, 2021*; 1:00 pm		St. Francis Brooklyn	L 61–75	2–8	Memorial Hall (435); Dover, DE
December 18, 2021*; 1:00 pm, TNT		vs. North Carolina Central; Legacy Classic	L 53–86	2–9	Prudential Center; Newark, NJ
December 20, 2021*; 7:00 pm		at Wagner	L 51–93	2–10	Spiro Sports Center (959); Staten Island, NY
December 22, 2021*; 7:00 pm, ESPN+		at Temple	L 48–85	2–11	Liacouras Center (3,122); Philadelphia, PA
December 29, 2021*; 6:00 pm		at Penn State	Canceled due to COVID-19 protocols		Bryce Jordan Center; University Park, PA
MEAC regular season
January 12, 2022; 7:30 pm		at Norfolk State	L 51–80	2–12 (0–1)	Joseph G. Echols Memorial Hall (515); Norfolk, VA
January 22, 2022; 4:30 pm		North Carolina Central	L 49–73	2–13 (0–2)	Memorial Hall (0); Dover, DE
January 24, 2022; 7:30 pm		South Carolina State	L 62–64	2–14 (0–3)	Memorial Hall (0); Dover, DE
January 30, 2022; 5:00 pm		at Morgan State	L 70–82	2–15 (0–4)	Talmadge L. Hill Field House (324); Baltimore, MD
February 2, 2022; 7:30 pm		Coppin State	L 57–59	2–16 (0–5)	Memorial Hall (0); Dover, DE
February 7, 2022; 7:30 pm		Howard; Rescheduled from January 8	L 64–69	2–17 (0–6)	Memorial Hall (600); Dover, DE
February 9, 2022; 7:30 pm		Maryland Eastern Shore; Rescheduled from January 15	L 50–58	2–18 (0–7)	Memorial Hall (600); Dover, DE
February 12, 2022; 4:00 pm		at Howard	L 72–85	2–19 (0–8)	Burr Gymnasium (1,164); Washington, D.C.
February 14, 2022; 7:30 pm		Norfolk State	L 66–69	2–20 (0–9)	Memorial Hall (600); Dover, DE
February 19, 2022; 4:00 pm		at North Carolina Central	L 79–84 ^{OT}	2–21 (0–10)	McDougald–McLendon Arena (2,127); Durham, NC
February 21, 2022; 7:30 pm		at South Carolina State	L 74–79	2–22 (0–11)	SHM Memorial Center (215); Orangeburg, SC
February 26, 2022; 4:30 pm		Morgan State	L 69–76	2–23 (0–12)	Memorial Hall (1,273); Dover, DE
February 28, 2022; 7:30 pm		at Coppin State	L 67–80	2–24 (0–13)	Physical Education Complex (440); Baltimore, MD
March 3, 2022; 7:30 pm		at Maryland Eastern Shore	L 59–63	2–25 (0–14)	Hytche Athletic Center (897); Princess Anne, MD
MEAC tournament
March 9, 2022; 6:00 pm, ESPN+	(8)	vs. (1) Norfolk State; Quarterfinals	L 66–74	2–26	Norfolk Scope; Norfolk, VA
*Non-conference game. ^{#}Rankings from AP Poll. (#) Tournament seedings in parentheses. All times are in Eastern.
