= 2021–22 Maryland Eastern Shore Hawks men's basketball team =

American college basketball season

2021–22 Maryland Eastern Shore Hawks men's basketball
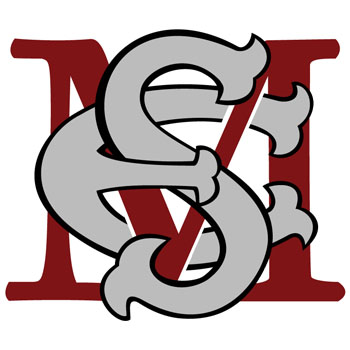

The Basketball Classic, First Round
- Conference: Mid-Eastern Athletic Conference
- Record: 11–16 (6–8 MEAC)
- Head coach: Jason Crafton (2nd season)
- Assistant coaches: CJ Council; Larry Roberson; Kassim Kaba
- Home arena: Hytche Athletic Center

2021–22 MEAC men's basketball standings
	Conf.				Overall
Team	W		L	PCT	W		L	PCT
Norfolk State †	12	–	2	.857	24	–	7	.774
Howard	9	–	5	.643	16	–	13	.552
North Carolina Central	8	–	5	.615	16	–	15	.516
Morgan State	7	–	6	.538	13	–	15	.464
South Carolina State	7	–	7	.500	15	–	16	.484
Maryland Eastern Shore	6	–	8	.429	11	–	16	.407
Coppin State	6	–	8	.429	9	–	23	.281
Delaware State	0	–	14	.000	2	–	26	.071
† 2022 MEAC tournament winner

The 2021–22 Maryland Eastern Shore Hawks men's basketball team represented the University of Maryland Eastern Shore in the 2021–22 NCAA Division I men's basketball season. The Hawks, led by second-year head coach Jason Crafton, played their home games at the Hytche Athletic Center in Princess Anne, Maryland as members of the Mid-Eastern Athletic Conference. They finished the season 11–16, 6–8 in MEAC play to finish in a tie for sixth place. As the No. 6 seed in the MEAC tournament, they lost in the quarterfinals to North Carolina Central. The Hawks received an invite to the 2022 The Basketball Classic postseason tournament, formerly known as the CollegeInsider.com Tournament, where they lost in the first round at Coastal Carolina.

== Previous season ==
The Hawks did not participate in the 2020–21 season due to the ongoing COVID-19 pandemic.

== Roster ==
2021–22 Maryland Eastern Shore Hawks men's basketball team
Players
Coaches

Pos.	#	Name	Height	Weight	Year	Hometown
G	0	Mike Mensah	6 ft 5 in (1.96 m)	205 lb (93 kg)	Sr	Inglewood, CA
G	1	Donchevell "Tuka" Nugent	6 ft 0 in (1.83 m)	178 lb (81 kg)	Sr	Newburgh, NY
G	2	Chace Davis	6 ft 3 in (1.91 m)	180 lb (82 kg)	Fr	Accokeek, MD
G	3	Zion Styles	6 ft 3 in (1.91 m)	199 lb (90 kg)	Sr	Uniondale, NY
G	4	Kevon Voyles	6 ft 3 in (1.91 m)	181 lb (82 kg)	Jr	Cape Charles, VA
G	5	Da'Shawn Phillip	6 ft 5 in (1.96 m)	172 lb (78 kg)	Jr	Baltimore, MD
G	10	Lamont Sanders	6 ft 0 in (1.83 m)	165 lb (75 kg)	Jr	Baltimore, MD
F	11	Kohen Thompson	6 ft 7 in (2.01 m)	205 lb (93 kg)	Jr	Memphis, TN
F	13	Mayowa Akinsanya	6 ft 7 in (2.01 m)	225 lb (102 kg)	Sr	Los Angeles, CA
F	21	Marko Milivojevic	6 ft 10 in (2.08 m)	240 lb (109 kg)	Fr	Oakville, Ontario, Canada
F	22	Nathaniel Pollard, Jr.	6 ft 5 in (1.96 m)	225 lb (102 kg)	Sr	Richmond, VA
G	23	Dom London	6 ft 1 in (1.85 m)	170 lb (77 kg)	Jr	Christiana, PA

Head coach

- Jason Crafton (Nyack)

Assistant coach(es)

- CJ Council (St. John's)
- Larry Roberson (Nyack)
- Kassim Kaba (American International)

Legend

- (C) Team captain
- (S) Suspended
- (I) Ineligible
- (W) Walk-on
- Injured
- Current redshirt

Roster
Last update: November 18, 2021

== Schedule and results ==
Date time, TV	Rank^{#}	Opponent^{#}	Result	Record	Site (attendance) city, state
Non-conference regular season
November 9, 2021*; 8:00 pm, ESPN+		at Saint Joseph's	L 67–69	0–1	Hagan Arena (1,617); Philadelphia, PA
November 10, 2021*; 7:00 pm, ESPN+		at Temple	L 49–72	0–2	Liacouras Center (3,486); Philadelphia, PA
November 13, 2021*; 4:00 pm, Facebook Live		Bryn Athyn	W 91–42	1–2	Hytche Athletic Center (600); Princess Anne, MD
November 17, 2021*; 7:00 pm		Hood College	Postponed due to COVID-19 protocols		Hytche Athletic Center; Princess Anne, MD
November 19, 2021*; 7:00 pm, ESPN+		at Fordham	W 75–73 ^{2OT}	2–2	Rose Hill Gymnasium (795); Bronx, NY
November 24, 2021*; 1:00 pm, ESPN+		at Campbell	L 55–66	2–3	Gore Arena (1,178); Buies Creek, NC
November 27, 2021*; 7:00 pm		at Liberty	L 61–73	2–4	Liberty Arena (3,000); Lynchburg, VA
November 30, 2021*; 7:00 pm, CBSSN		at No. 17 UConn	L 63–72	2–5	XL Center (8,782); Hartford, CT
December 4, 2021*; 4:30 pm		at Lehigh	W 81–75	3–5	Stabler Arena (657); Bethlehem, PA
December 8, 2021*; 7:00 pm		Clarks Summit	W 102–58	4–5	Hytche Athletic Center (346); Princess Anne, MD
December 11, 2021*; 4:00 pm		St. Mary's (MD)	W 79–43	5–5	Hytche Athletic Center (389); Princess Anne, MD
December 20, 2021*; 7:00 pm		at Charlotte	L 54–70	5–6	Dale F. Halton Arena (2,092); Charlotte, NC
December 22, 2021*; 12:00 pm, ESPN+		at George Washington	Postponed due to COVID-19 protocols		Charles E. Smith Center; Washington, D.C.
December 28, 2021*; 8:00 pm, ESPN+		at Columbia	Canceled due to COVID-19 protocols		Levien Gymnasium; New York, NY
December 31, 2021*; 2:00 pm, FloSports		Longwood	Postponed due to COVID-19 protocols		Hytche Athletic Center; Princess Anne, MD
MEAC regular season
January 17, 2022; 4:00 pm, FloSports		Norfolk State; Rescheduled from January 8	L 58–72	5–7 (0–1)	Hytche Athletic Center (350); Princess Anne, MD
January 22, 2022; 4:00 pm, FloSports		South Carolina State	L 60–69	5–8 (0–2)	Hytche Athletic Center (369); Princess Anne, MD
January 24, 2022; 7:30 pm, FloSports		North Carolina Central	L 63–75	5–9 (0–3)	Hytche Athletic Center (0); Princess Anne, MD
January 29, 2022; 4:00 pm		at Coppin State	W 64–61	6–9 (1–3)	Physical Education Complex (647); Baltimore, MD
January 31, 2022; 7:30 pm, FloSports		Morgan State	W 79–72	7–9 (2–3)	Hytche Athletic Center (660); Princess Anne, MD
February 5, 2022; 7:30 pm		at Howard; Rescheduled from January 10	L 64–72	7–10 (2–4)	Burr Gymnasium (1,271); Washington, D.C.
February 9, 2022; 7:30 pm		at Delaware State; Rescheduled from January 15	W 58–50	8–10 (3–4)	Memorial Hall (600); Dover, DE
February 12, 2022; 6:00 pm		at Norfolk State	L 63–70	8–11 (3–5)	Joseph G. Echols Memorial Hall (3,278); Norfolk, VA
February 14, 2022; 7:30 pm, FloSports		Howard	L 71–77	8–12 (3–6)	Hytche Athletic Center (747); Princess Anne, MD
February 19, 2022; 4:00 pm		at South Carolina State	L 63–70	8–13 (3–7)	SHM Memorial Center (275); Orangeburg, SC
February 21, 2022; 7:30 pm		at North Carolina Central	W 79–66	9–13 (4–7)	McDougald–McLendon Arena (2,273); Durham, NC
February 26, 2022; 4:00 pm, FloSports		Coppin State	W 70–50	10–13 (5–7)	Hytche Athletic Center (750); Princess Anne, MD
February 28, 2022		at Morgan State	L 48–82	10–14 (5–8)	Talmadge L. Hill Field House (3,956); Baltimore, MD
March 3, 2022; 7:30 pm		Delaware State	W 63–59	11–14 (6–8)	Hytche Athletic Center (897); Princess Anne, MD
MEAC tournament
March 10, 2022; 8:00 pm, ESPN+	(6)	vs. (3) North Carolina Central; Quarterfinals	L 56–68	11–15	Norfolk Scope; Norfolk, VA
The Basketball Classic
March 16, 2022; 7:00 pm, ESPN+		at Coastal Carolina; First Round	L 42–66	11–16	HTC Center; Conway, SC
*Non-conference game. ^{#}Rankings from AP Poll. (#) Tournament seedings in parentheses. All times are in Eastern.
