= 2021–22 Saint Peter's Peacocks men's basketball team =

American college basketball season

2021–22 Saint Peter's Peacocks men's basketball

MAAC tournament champions

NCAA tournament, Elite Eight
- Conference: Metro Atlantic Athletic Conference

Ranking
- Coaches: No. 24
- Record: 22–12 (14–6 MAAC)
- Head coach: Shaheen Holloway (4th season)
- Assistant coaches: Ryan Whalen; Rasheen Davis; Umar Shannon
- Home arena: Run Baby Run Arena

2021–22 MAAC men's basketball standings
	Conf.				Overall
Team	W		L	PCT	W		L	PCT
Iona	17	–	3	.850	25	–	8	.758
Saint Peter's †	14	–	6	.700	22	–	12	.647
Siena	12	–	8	.600	15	–	14	.517
Monmouth	11	–	9	.550	21	–	13	.618
Niagara	9	–	11	.450	14	–	16	.467
Marist	9	–	11	.450	14	–	16	.467
Fairfield	8	–	12	.400	15	–	18	.455
Manhattan	8	–	12	.400	15	–	15	.500
Rider	8	–	12	.400	14	–	19	.424
Canisius	7	–	13	.350	11	–	21	.344
Quinnipiac	7	–	13	.350	14	–	17	.452
† 2022 MAAC tournament winner

The 2021–22 Saint Peter's Peacocks men's basketball team represented Saint Peter's University in the 2021–22 NCAA Division I men's basketball season. The Peacocks, led by fourth-year head coach Shaheen Holloway, played their home games at the Run Baby Run Arena in Jersey City, New Jersey, as members of the Metro Atlantic Athletic Conference (MAAC). They finished the season 22–12, 14–6 in MAAC play, to finish in second place. They defeated Fairfield and Quinnipiac in the MAAC tournament, advancing to the championship game. There they defeated Monmouth to win the tournament championship. As a result, they received the conference's automatic bid to the NCAA tournament, for the first time since 2011, as the No. 15 seed in the East region.

The Peacocks defeated No. 2 seed Kentucky to become only the tenth No. 15 seed to upset a No. 2 seed in the tournament's history. They defeated Murray State to advance to the Sweet Sixteen, becoming only the third No. 15 seed and first MAAC men's team to make it to the second weekend. They defeated Purdue to advance to the Elite Eight, becoming the first No. 15 seed to do so. In the Elite Eight, the Peacocks lost to No. 8 seed and eventual national runner-up North Carolina. The Peacocks concluded their historic season with an overall record of 22–12 and the best NCAA post-season run with the most wins in a single NCAA tournament by any MAAC program (men or women) in the conference's history.

On March 30, 2022, head coach and Seton Hall alum Shaheen Holloway left to take the head coaching position at his alma mater where he previously was an assistant from 2010 through 2018. On April 1, a parade was held in Jersey City to celebrate the Peacocks' tournament run. On April 5, Saint Peter's was ranked No. 24 nationally in the season's final USA Today Coaches Poll.

== Previous season ==
In a season limited due to the COVID-19 pandemic, the Peacocks finished the 2020–21 season 14–11, 10–8 in MAAC play, to finish in a tie for third place. As the No. 3 seed in the MAAC tournament, they defeated Rider in the quarterfinals before losing to Fairfield in the semifinals.

== Roster ==
2021–22 Saint Peter's Peacocks men's basketball team
Players
Coaches

Pos.	#	Name	Height	Weight	Year	Previous school	Hometown
G	0	Latrell Reid	6 ft 3 in (1.91 m)	185 lb (84 kg)	Jr	Coffeyville CC	Willingboro, NJ
G	1	Brent Bland	6 ft 3 in (1.91 m)	205 lb (93 kg)	Fr	Half Hollow Hills West	Wheatley Heights, NY
G	2	Marty Silvera	6 ft 0 in (1.83 m)	190 lb (86 kg)	So	Putnam Science Academy	Worcester, MA
F	4	Jerry Ngopot	6 ft 10 in (2.08 m)	220 lb (100 kg)	Fr	Lee Academy	Bangui, Central African Republic
G	5	Daryl III Banks	6 ft 3 in (1.91 m)	165 lb (75 kg)	Jr	The Patrick School	Los Angeles, CA
F	10	Fousseyni Drame	6 ft 7 in (2.01 m)	200 lb (91 kg)	Jr	Our Savior New American	Bamako, Mali
F	11	KC Ndefo	6 ft 7 in (2.01 m)	195 lb (88 kg)	Sr	Abraham Lincoln	Elmont, NY
F	12	Clarence Rupert	6 ft 8 in (2.03 m)	245 lb (111 kg)	Fr	Miller School of Albemarle	Philadelphia, PA
G	13	Isiah Dasher	6 ft 4 in (1.93 m)	170 lb (77 kg)	Sr	Portland	Jersey City, NJ
F	14	Hassan Drame	6 ft 7 in (2.01 m)	200 lb (91 kg)	Jr	Our Savior New American	Bamako, Mali
G	15	Matthew Lee	6 ft 0 in (1.83 m)	160 lb (73 kg)	Jr	Dohn Prep	San Juan, Puerto Rico
F	24	Oumar Diahame	6 ft 10 in (2.08 m)	225 lb (102 kg)	So	The Patrick School	Dakar, Senegal
G	25	Doug Edert	6 ft 2 in (1.88 m)	185 lb (84 kg)	Jr	Bergen Catholic	Nutley, NJ
G	32	Jaylen Murray	5 ft 11 in (1.8 m)	175 lb (79 kg)	Fr	Putnam Science Academy	Putnam, CT
F	35	Mouhamed Sow	6 ft 9 in (2.06 m)	195 lb (88 kg)	Fr	The Patrick School	Dakar, Senegal

Head coach

- Shaheen Holloway (Seton Hall)

Assistant coach(es)

- Ryan Whalen (Saint Joseph's)
- Rasheen Davis (St. Thomas Aquinas)
- Umar Shannon (Saint Francis (PA))

Legend

- (C) Team captain
- (S) Suspended
- (I) Ineligible
- (W) Walk-on
- Injured
- Current redshirt

Roster
Last update: March 26, 2022

== Schedule and results ==
Date time, TV	Rank^{#}	Opponent^{#}	Result	Record	High points	High rebounds	High assists	Site (attendance) city, state
Exhibition
November 1, 2021*; 7:00 p.m.		New Jersey City	W 90–66	–	15 – Lee	7 – H. Drame	4 – Ndefo	Run Baby Run Arena (842); Jersey City, NJ
Regular season
November 9, 2021*; 6:00 p.m., ESPN+		at VCU	L 54–57	0–1	17 – Edert	8 – F. Drame	3 – Lee	Siegel Center (7,017); Richmond, VA
November 13, 2021*; 4:00 p.m., FS2		at St. John's	L 70–91	0–2	11 – Murray	7 – H. Drame	3 – Murray	Carnesecca Arena (3,795); Queens, NY
November 17, 2021*; 7:00 p.m.		at Wagner	Canceled due to COVID-19 issues at Wagner					Spiro Sports Center; Staten Island, NY
November 23, 2021*; 7:00 p.m., ESPN3		LIU	W 64–62	1–2	17 – Edert	9 – Ndefo	6 – Lee	Run Baby Run Arena (434); Jersey City, NJ
November 27, 2021*; 12:00 p.m., FS2		at Providence	L 71–85	1–3	26 – Banks III	9 – F. Drame	4 – Lee	Dunkin' Donuts Center (6,978); Providence, RI
December 3, 2021; 7:00 p.m., ESPN3		at Quinnipiac	W 69–59	2–3 (1–0)	16 – Ndefo	13 – F. Drame	7 – Ndefo	People's United Center (1,054); Hamden, CT
December 5, 2021; 2:00 p.m., ESPN3		Siena	L 58–60	2–4 (1–1)	14 – Banks III	8 – Ndefo	4 – Murray	Run Baby Run Arena (483); Jersey City, NJ
December 8, 2021*; 7:00 p.m., ESPN3		St. Francis Brooklyn	L 60–71	2–5	10 – F. Drame	6 – Banks III	3 – Banks III	Run Baby Run Arena (464); Jersey City, NJ
December 12, 2021*; 1:00 p.m., ESPN3		Nyack	W 87–48	3–5	22 – F. Drame	12 – F. Drame	7 – Murray	Run Baby Run Arena (344); Jersey City, NJ
December 18, 2021*; 6:30 p.m., ESPN3		at Stony Brook	L 63–64	3–6	13 – Ndefo	7 – H. Drame	4 – Murray	Island Federal Arena (1,539); Stony Brook, NY
December 22, 2021*; 3:00 p.m., NEC Front Row		at Fairleigh Dickinson	Canceled due to COVID-19 issues at FDU					Rothman Center; Hackensack, NJ
January 14, 2022; 7:00 p.m., ESPN3		Monmouth	W 67–62	4–6 (2–1)	13 – Banks III	8 – Ndefo	3 – Ndefo	Run Baby Run Arena (483); Jersey City, NJ
January 16, 2022; 2:00 p.m., ESPN3		at Rider	W 58–51	5–6 (3–1)	12 – Edert	10 – F. Drame	4 – Lee	Alumni Gymnasium (1,068); Lawrenceville, NJ
January 18, 2022; 2:00 p.m., ESPN+		Canisius; Rescheduled from December 31	W 65–57	6–6 (4–1)	17 – Dasher	12 – Ndefo	2 – Ndefo	Run Baby Run Arena (281); Jersey City, NJ
January 21, 2022; 7:00 p.m., ESPN3		at Niagara	W 74–68 ^{OT}	7–6 (5–1)	22 – Ndefo	13 – Ndefo	5 – Banks III	Gallagher Center (1,080); Lewiston, NY
January 23, 2022; 1:00 p.m., ESPN3		at Canisius	L 60–63	7–7 (5–2)	19 – H. Drame	11 – H. Drame	2 – H. Drame	Koessler Athletic Center (782); Buffalo, NY
January 26, 2022; 7:00 p.m., ESPN3		at Marist; Rescheduled from January 2	W 69–62	8–7 (6–2)	18 – H. Drame	11 – H. Drame	4 – Lee	McCann Arena (986); Poughkeepsie, NY
January 28, 2022; 7:00 p.m., ESPN3		Manhattan	W 77–51	9–7 (7–2)	14 – Murray	7 – F. Drame	3 – Ndefo	Run Baby Run Arena (510); Jersey City, NJ
January 30, 2022; 1:00 p.m., ESPN3		at Iona	L 77–85	9–8 (7–3)	21 – Edert	6 – Ndefo	3 – Lee	Hynes Athletic Center (2,318); New Rochelle, NY
February 4, 2022; 7:00 p.m., ESPNU		Quinnipiac	W 83–74	10–8 (8–3)	16 – Banks III	10 – F. Drame	4 – Lee	Run Baby Run Arena (777); Jersey City, NJ
February 6, 2022; 2:00 p.m., ESPN+		Marist	W 66–50	11–8 (9–3)	13 – Banks III	8 – F. Drame	4 – Ndefo	Run Baby Run Arena (632); Jersey City, NJ
February 11, 2022; 7:00 p.m., ESPN3		Rider	L 49–58	11–9 (9–4)	9 – Dasher	11 – Ndefo	4 – Lee	Run Baby Run Arena (577); Jersey City, NJ
February 15, 2022; 7:00 p.m., ESPN+		Iona; Rescheduled from January 7	L 61–70	11–10 (9–5)	16 – Ndefo	8 – Ndefo	4 – Lee	Run Baby Run Arena (695); Jersey City, NJ
February 18, 2022; 7:00 p.m., ESPN+		at Fairfield	W 70–59	12–10 (10–5)	16 – Ndefo	7 – Ndefo	4 – Lee	Webster Bank Arena (1,611); Bridgeport, CT
February 20, 2022; 2:00 p.m., ESPN+		at Siena	L 70–84	12–11 (10–6)	16 – Banks III	9 – H. Drame	4 – Murray	MVP Arena (6,044); Albany, NY
February 25, 2022; 7:00 p.m., ESPN3		at Monmouth	W 70–65	13–11 (11–6)	14 – Ndefo	11 – Ndefo	3 – Ndefo	OceanFirst Bank Center (2,027); West Long Branch, NJ
February 27, 2022; 2:00 p.m., ESPN+		Niagara	W 63–36	14–11 (12–6)	13 – Banks III	10 – H. Drame	5 – Lee	Run Baby Run Arena (581); Jersey City, NJ
March 1, 2022; 7:00 p.m., ESPN+		at Manhattan; Rescheduled from January 9	W 73–51	15–11 (13–6)	13 – Banks III	5 – F. Drame	3 – Ndefo	Draddy Gymnasium (200); Riverdale, NY
March 5, 2022; 1:00 p.m., ESPN3		Fairfield	W 57–41	16–11 (14–6)	14 – Ndefo	7 – Ndefo	5 – Lee	Run Baby Run Arena (577); Jersey City, NJ
MAAC tournament
March 9, 2022; 9:30 p.m., ESPN+	(2)	vs. (7) Fairfield; Quarterfinals	W 77–63	17–11	20 – Ndefo	6 – Rupert	2 – Banks III	Boardwalk Hall; Atlantic City, NJ
March 11, 2022; 8:30 p.m., ESPNews	(2)	vs. (11) Quinnipiac; Semifinals	W 64–52	18–11	14 – Lee	7 – Ndefo	2 – Ndefo	Boardwalk Hall; Atlantic City, NJ
March 12, 2022; 4:00 p.m., ESPNU	(2)	vs. (4) Monmouth; Championship	W 60–54	19–11	20 – Edert	10 – F. Drame	2 – Edert	Boardwalk Hall; Atlantic City, NJ
NCAA tournament
March 17, 2022*; 7:10 p.m., CBS	(15 E)	vs. (2 E) No. 7 Kentucky; First Round	W 85–79 ^{OT}	20–11	27 – Banks III	8 – H. Drame	4 – H. Drame	Gainbridge Fieldhouse (17,923); Indianapolis, IN
March 19, 2022*; 8:20 p.m., CBS	(15 E)	vs. (7 E) No. 20 Murray State; Second Round	W 70–60	21–11	17 – Ndefo	10 – Ndefo	4 – Lee	Gainbridge Fieldhouse (17,838); Indianapolis, IN
March 25, 2022*; 7:09 p.m., CBS	(15 E)	vs. (3 E) No. 10 Purdue; Sweet Sixteen	W 67–64	22–11	14 – Banks III	3 – 4 tied	4 – Ndefo	Wells Fargo Center (20,136); Philadelphia, PA
March 27, 2022*; 5:05 p.m., CBS	(15 E)	vs. (8 E) North Carolina; Elite Eight	L 49–69	22–12	12 – F. Drame	7 – 2 tied	3 – Ndefo	Wells Fargo Center (20,235); Philadelphia, PA
*Non-conference game. ^{#}Rankings from AP poll. (#) Tournament seedings in parentheses. All times are in Eastern.

== Rankings ==
Ranking movements Legend: ██ Increase in ranking ██ Decrease in ranking — = Not ranked
	Week																			
Poll	Pre	1	2	3	4	5	6	7	8	9	10	11	12	13	14	15	16	17	18	Final
AP	—	—	—	—	—	—	—	—	—	—	—	—	—	—	—	—	—	—	—	Not released
Coaches	—	—*	—	—	—	—	—	—	—	—	—	—	—	—	—	—	—	—	—	24

*Coaches did not release a week 1 poll.
