= 2021–22 Morgan State Bears basketball team =

American college basketball season

2021–22 Morgan State Bears men's basketball
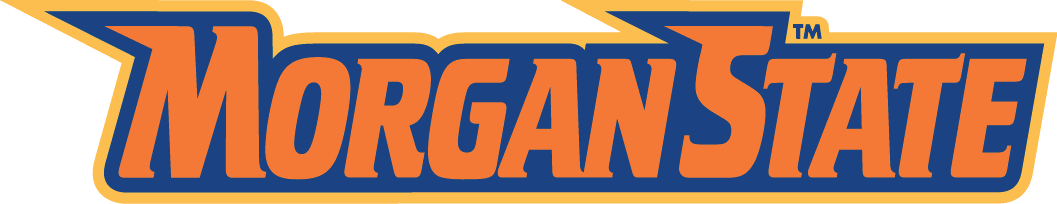

The Basketball Classic, First Round
- Conference: Mid-Eastern Athletic Conference
- Record: 13–15 (7–6 MEAC)
- Head coach: Kevin Broadus (3rd season)
- Assistant coaches: Brian Merritt; Chretien Lukusa; Kevin Jones
- Home arena: Talmadge L. Hill Field House

2021–22 MEAC men's basketball standings
	Conf.				Overall
Team	W		L	PCT	W		L	PCT
Norfolk State †	12	–	2	.857	24	–	7	.774
Howard	9	–	5	.643	16	–	13	.552
North Carolina Central	8	–	5	.615	16	–	15	.516
Morgan State	7	–	6	.538	13	–	15	.464
South Carolina State	7	–	7	.500	15	–	16	.484
Maryland Eastern Shore	6	–	8	.429	11	–	16	.407
Coppin State	6	–	8	.429	9	–	23	.281
Delaware State	0	–	14	.000	2	–	26	.071
† 2022 MEAC tournament winner

The 2021–22 Morgan State Bears men's basketball team represented Morgan State University in the 2021–22 NCAA Division I men's basketball season. The Bears, led by third-year head coach Kevin Broadus, played their home games at Talmadge L. Hill Field House in Baltimore, Maryland as members of the Mid-Eastern Athletic Conference.

== Previous season ==
The Bears finished the 2020–21 season 14–8, 7–5 in MEAC play to finish in third place in the Northern Division. In the MEAC tournament, they defeated Florida A&M in the quarterfinals, Coppin State in the semifinals, to advance to the championship game. In the title game, they would lose to Norfolk State.

== Roster ==
2021–22 Morgan State Bears men's basketball team
Players
Coaches

Pos.	#	Name	Height	Weight	Year	Hometown
F	0	Lagio Grantsaan	6 ft 8 in (2.03 m)	235 lb (107 kg)	Sr	Utrecht, Netherlands
F	1	Myles Douglas	6 ft 7 in (2.01 m)	215 lb (98 kg)	Sr	Edgewood, Maryland
G	2	Isaiah Burke	6 ft 1 in (1.85 m)	180 lb (82 kg)	Sr	Bowie, Maryland
G	3	Keith McGee	6 ft 3 in (1.91 m)	190 lb (86 kg)	GS	Rochester, New York
G	4	Naseem Khaalid	6 ft 2 in (1.88 m)	180 lb (82 kg)	So	Sumter, South Carolina
G	5	Sherwyn Devonish	6 ft 1 in (1.85 m)	192 lb (87 kg)	Sr	Bladensburg, Maryland
G	10	Will Thomas	6 ft 5 in (1.96 m)	195 lb (88 kg)	So	Baltimore, Maryland
G	11	Malik Miller	6 ft 4 in (1.93 m)	191 lb (87 kg)	Sr	Washington, D.C.
G	12	Thai're Vance	6 ft 2 in (1.88 m)	188 lb (85 kg)	Jr	Silver Spring, Maryland
G	20	De'Torrion Ware	6 ft 4 in (1.93 m)	200 lb (91 kg)	Jr	Hopkinsville, Kentucky
F	21	Collin Nnamene	6 ft 8 in (2.03 m)	210 lb (95 kg)	GS	Enugu State, Nigeria
G	23	Seventh Woods	6 ft 2 in (1.88 m)	184 lb (83 kg)	GS	Columbia, South Carolina
G	24	Elijah Bowens	5 ft 11 in (1.8 m)	170 lb (77 kg)	Sr	Bowie, Maryland
F	31	Ty Horner	6 ft 10 in (2.08 m)	255 lb (116 kg)	Jr	Sisters, Oregon
F	32	Chad Venning	6 ft 10 in (2.08 m)	280 lb (127 kg)	So	Brooklyn, New York
G	55	Trevor Moore	6 ft 5 in (1.96 m)	195 lb (88 kg)	Sr	Houston, Texas

Head coach

- Kevin Broadus (Bowie State)

Assistant coach(es)

- Brian Merritt (Towson)
- Chretien Lukusa (Binghamton)
- Kevin Jones (Bowie State)

Legend

- (C) Team captain
- (S) Suspended
- (I) Ineligible
- (W) Walk-on
- Injured
- Current redshirt

Roster
Last update: January 11, 2022

== Schedule and results ==
Date time, TV	Rank^{#}	Opponent^{#}	Result	Record	Site (attendance) city, state
Non-conference regular season
November 9, 2021*; 6:00 pm		St. Mary's (MD)	W 118–55	1–0	Talmadge L. Hill Field House (3,678); Baltimore, MD
November 11, 2021*; 6:00 pm		Penn State Allegheny	W 126–71	2–0	Talmadge L. Hill Field House (3,102); Baltimore, MD
November 14, 2021*; 6:00 pm, ESPN+		at George Mason	L 53–90	2–1	EagleBank Arena (2,915); Fairfax, VA
November 18, 2021*; 10:00 pm, ESPN+		at Seattle	L 80–93	2–2	Redhawk Center (524); Seattle, WA
November 20, 2021*; 8:00 pm, WCC		at Portland	L 63–74	2–3	Chiles Center (1,122); Portland, OR
November 22, 2021*; 9:00 pm, WCC		at San Francisco	L 67–83	2–4	War Memorial Gymnasium (1,689); San Francisco, CA
November 28, 2021*; 10:30 pm, ESPNU		vs. Grambling State; Chris Paul Boost Mobile HBCU Challenge	L 59–74	2–5	Footprint Center (2,103); Phoenix, AZ
November 29, 2021*; 8:30 pm, ESPNU		vs. Hampton; Chris Paul HBCU Challenge	W 60–47	3–5	Footprint Center (720); Phoenix, AZ
December 6, 2021*; 5:00 pm		Millersville	W 77–71	4–5	Talmadge L. Hill Field House (2,579); Baltimore, MD
December 11, 2021*; 3:00 pm, ESPN+		at Longwood	L 55–94	4–6	Willett Hall (944); Farmville, VA
December 18, 2021*; 4:00 pm		at Mount St. Mary's	L 60–74	4–7	Knott Arena (1,116); Emmitsburg, MD
December 21, 2021*; 5:00 pm		James Madison	Canceled due to COVID-19 protocols		Talmadge L. Hill Field House; Baltimore, MD
December 23, 2021*; 7:00 pm, BTN		at Wisconsin	Canceled due to COVID-19 protocols		Kohl Center; Madison, WI
December 27, 2021*; 12:00 pm		Penn State Wilkes-Barre	Postponed due to COVID-19 protocols		Talmadge L. Hill Field House; Baltimore, MD
December 29, 2021*; 8:00 pm, ESPN+		at Kansas State	Canceled due to COVID-19 protocols		Bramlage Coliseum; Manhattan, KS
January 5, 2022*; 5:00 pm		Goucher	W 100–41	5–7	Talmadge L. Hill Field House (34); Baltimore, MD
MEAC regular season
January 8, 2022; 4:00 pm		at North Carolina Central	Postponed due to COVID-19 protocols at North Carolina Central		McDougald–McLendon Arena; Durham, NC
January 10, 2022; 7:30 pm		at South Carolina State	W 88–81 ^{OT}	6–7 (1–0)	SHM Memorial Center (500); Orangeburg, SC
January 15, 2022; 4:00 pm		Coppin State	L 76–79	6–8 (1–1)	Talmadge L. Hill Field House (1,431); Baltimore, MD
January 22, 2022; 4:00 pm		Howard	L 82–91	6–9 (1–2)	Talmadge L. Hill Field House (1,987); Baltimore, MD
January 24, 2022; 7:30 pm, ESPNU		at Norfolk State	L 62–82	6–10 (1–3)	Joseph G. Echols Memorial Hall (1,562); Norfolk, VA
January 30, 2022; 2:00 pm		Delaware State	W 82–70	7–10 (2–3)	Talmadge L. Hill Field House (324); Baltimore, MD
January 31, 2022; 7:30 pm, FloHoops		at Maryland Eastern Shore	L 72–79	7–11 (2–4)	Hytche Athletic Center (660); Princess Anne, MD
February 12, 2022; 4:00 pm		North Carolina Central	L 64–74	7–12 (2–5)	Talmadge L. Hill Field House (0); Baltimore, MD
February 14, 2022; 7:30 pm		South Carolina State	W 76–66	8–12 (3–5)	Talmadge L. Hill Field House (1,789); Baltimore, MD
February 19, 2022; 2:00 pm, ESPN2/TNT/NBA TV		vs. Howard; NBA HBCU Classic	L 66–68	8–13 (3–6)	Wolstein Center (4,732); Cleveland, OH
February 21, 2022; 7:30 pm		Norfolk State	W 85–74	9–13 (4–6)	Talmadge L. Hill Field House (2,891); Baltimore, MD
February 26, 2022; 4:30 pm		at Delaware State	W 76–69	10–13 (5–6)	Memorial Hall (1,273); Dover, DE
February 28, 2022; 8:00 pm		Maryland Eastern Shore	W 82–48	11–13 (6–6)	Talmadge L. Hill Field House (3,956); Baltimore, MD
March 3, 2022; 7:30 pm		at Coppin State	W 63–59	12–13 (7–6)	Physical Education Complex (2,100); Baltimore, MD
MEAC tournament
March 10, 2022; 6:00 pm, ESPN+	(4)	vs. (5) South Carolina State; Quarterfinals	W 80–77	13–13	Norfolk Scope; Norfolk, VA
March 11, 2022; 6:00 pm, ESPN+	(4)	vs. (1) Norfolk State; Semifinals	L 63–72	13–14	Norfolk Scope; Norfolk, VA
The Basketball Classic
March 16, 2022; 7:00 pm, ESPN+		at Youngstown State; First Round	L 65–70	13–15	Beeghly Center; Youngstown, OH
*Non-conference game. ^{#}Rankings from AP Poll. (#) Tournament seedings in parentheses. All times are in Eastern.
