= 2021–22 South Carolina State Bulldogs basketball team =

American college basketball season

2021–22 South Carolina State Bulldogs basketball
- Conference: Mid-Eastern Athletic Conference
- Record: 15–16 (7–7 MEAC)
- Head coach: Tony Madlock (1st season)
- Assistant coaches: Derrick Mallison; Mardracus Wade; Raheem Waller; Ed Stephens
- Home arena: SHM Memorial Center

2021–22 MEAC men's basketball standings
	Conf.				Overall
Team	W		L	PCT	W		L	PCT
Norfolk State †	12	–	2	.857	24	–	7	.774
Howard	9	–	5	.643	16	–	13	.552
North Carolina Central	8	–	5	.615	16	–	15	.516
Morgan State	7	–	6	.538	13	–	15	.464
South Carolina State	7	–	7	.500	15	–	16	.484
Maryland Eastern Shore	6	–	8	.429	11	–	16	.407
Coppin State	6	–	8	.429	9	–	23	.281
Delaware State	0	–	14	.000	2	–	26	.071
† 2022 MEAC tournament winner

The 2021–22 South Carolina State Bulldogs basketball team represented South Carolina State University in the 2021–22 NCAA Division I men's basketball season. The Bulldogs, led by first-year head coach Tony Madlock, played their home games at SHM Memorial Center in Orangeburg, South Carolina as members of the Mid-Eastern Athletic Conference (MEAC).

== Previous season ==
The Bulldogs finished the 2020–21 season 1–17, 1–7 in MEAC play, to finish in last place in the Southern Division. Since only the top three teams from both divisions qualify for the MEAC tournament, they failed to qualify for the tournament.

On March 15, 2021 the school announced that head coach Murray Garvin's contract would not be renewed, ending his eight-year tenure with the team. Ten days later, on March 25, the school named Memphis assistant coach Tony Madlock as their next head coach.

== Roster ==
2021–22 South Carolina State Bulldogs men's basketball team
Players
Coaches

Pos.	#	Name	Height	Weight	Year	Hometown
G	1	Cameron Jones	6 ft 6 in (1.98 m)	190 lb (86 kg)	RS So	Memphis, TN
F	2	Jemel Davis	6 ft 9 in (2.06 m)	200 lb (91 kg)	Fr	Charlotte Amalie, USVI
G/F	4	Latavian Lawrence	6 ft 6 in (1.98 m)	212 lb (96 kg)	Fr	New Ellenton, SC
F	5	Deaquan Williams	6 ft 8 in (2.03 m)	215 lb (98 kg)	GS	Camden, NJ
G	10	Rahsaan Edwards	5 ft 11 in (1.8 m)	200 lb (91 kg)	So	Charles Town, WV
G	11	Rakeim Gary	5 ft 10 in (1.78 m)	165 lb (75 kg)	So	Dallas, TX
G/F	12	Omer Croskey	6 ft 6 in (1.98 m)	195 lb (88 kg)	So	Sumter, SC
G	13	Rashamel Bulter	6 ft 4 in (1.93 m)	200 lb (91 kg)	So	Ridgeland, SC
F	14	Edward Oliver-Hampton	6 ft 8 in (2.03 m)	195 lb (88 kg)	GS	Palmer Park, MD
G	20	T.J. Madlock	6 ft 3 in (1.91 m)	190 lb (86 kg)	Fr	Memphis, TN
G	23	Jadakiss Wright	6 ft 0 in (1.83 m)	175 lb (79 kg)	RS Fr	Beech Island, SC
F	35	Sebastian Guitian	6 ft 10 in (2.08 m)	235 lb (107 kg)	RS So	Miami, FL
C	42	Dallas James	7 ft 0 in (2.13 m)	245 lb (111 kg)	Fr	Artesia, CA
G	55	Raquan Brown	6 ft 3 in (1.91 m)	200 lb (91 kg)	So	Charlotte, NC

Head coach

- Tony Madlock (Memphis)

Assistant coach(es)

- Derrick Mallison (North Carolina Central)
- Mardracus Wade (Arkansas)
- Raheem Waller (South Carolina State)
- Ed Stephens (South Carolina State)

Legend

- (C) Team captain
- (S) Suspended
- (I) Ineligible
- (W) Walk-on
- Injured
- Current redshirt

Roster
Last update: December 7, 2021

== Schedule and results ==
Date time, TV	Rank^{#}	Opponent^{#}	Result	Record	High points	High rebounds	High assists	Site (attendance) city, state
Regular season
November 9, 2021*; 7:00 p.m., ESPN+		at East Carolina	L 62–70	0–1	15 – Jones	9 – 2 tied	2 – 2 tied	Williams Arena (3,605); Greenville, NC
November 11, 2021*; 7:00 p.m.		at College of Charleston; Rising Coaches Classic	L 74–106	0–2	15 – Jones	10 – Oliver-Hampton	4 – Madlock	TD Arena (4,448); Charleston, SC
November 12, 2021*; 4:00 p.m.		vs. Loyola (MD); Rising Coaches Classic	L 65–75	0–3	12 – Jones	8 – Oliver-Hampton	5 – Jones	TD Arena (150); Charleston, SC
November 13, 2021*; 7:30 p.m.		vs. Lipscomb; Rising Coaches Classic	L 81–93	0–4	23 – Jones	7 – Oliver-Hampton	6 – Madlock	TD Arena (232); Charleston, SC
November 16, 2021*; 7:00 p.m., SECN+/ESPN+		at Georgia	L 60–76	0–5	19 – Croskey	9 – Davis	5 – Madlock	Stegeman Coliseum (6,021); Athens, GA
November 18, 2021*; 8:00 p.m.		St. Andrews	W 67–53	1–5	17 – Gary	11 – Lawrence	9 – Madlock	SHM Memorial Center (403); Orangeburg, SC
November 23, 2021*; 7:00 p.m.		USC Upstate	L 78–82	1–6	19 – Oliver-Hampton	5 – Davis	8 – Gary	SHM Memorial Center (186); Orangeburg, SC
November 28, 2021*; 2:00 p.m.		The Citadel	L 79–91 ^{OT}	1–7	20 – Jones	12 – Oliver-Hampton	5 – Jones	SHM Memorial Center (400); Orangeburg, SC
December 3, 2021*; 7:00 p.m., ESPN+		at South Florida	W 65–64	2–7	15 – Madlock	7 – 2 tied	3 – 3 tied	Yuengling Center (2,143); Tampa, FL
December 10, 2021*; 7:00 p.m., ESPN+		vs. High Point; No Room for Racism Classic	W 67–66	3–7	12 – 2 tied	6 – Davis	5 – Gary	Rock Hill Sports & Event Center (565); Rock Hill, SC
December 14, 2021*; 8:00 p.m., ACCN		at No. 2 Duke	L 62–103	3–8	13 – Oliver-Hampton	8 – Williams	2 – 2 tied	Cameron Indoor Stadium (9,314); Durham, NC
December 16, 2021*; 7:00 p.m.		at Carver	W 105–46	4–8	16 – Madlock	10 – Lawrence	7 – Edwards	SHM Memorial Center (152); Orangeburg, SC
December 18, 2021*; 2:00 p.m.		Tennessee State	W 90–88 ^{OT}	5–8	19 – Edwards	10 – Madlock	6 – Edwards	SHM Memorial Center (152); Orangeburg, SC
December 20, 2021*; 5:00 p.m., ESPN+		at The Citadel; The Citadel Classic	W 74–57	6–8	18 – Madlock	8 – Madlock	5 – Edwards	McAlister Field House (913); Charleston, SC
December 21, 2021*; 5:00 p.m., ESPN+		vs. Charleston Southern; The Citadel Classic	W 75–65	7–8	20 – Madlock	10 – Madlock	3 – Edwards	McAlister Field House; Charleston, SC
December 29, 2021*; 3:00 p.m., SECN+/ESPN+		at South Carolina	Postponed due to COVID-19 protocols					Colonial Life Arena; Columbia, SC
January 2, 2022*; 2:00 p.m.		Greensboro	Postponed due to COVID-19 protocols					SHM Memorial Center; Orangeburg, SC
January 8, 2022; 4:00 p.m.		Coppin State	L 65–74	7–9 (0–1)	21 – Madlock	9 – Madlock	4 – Madlock	SHM Memorial Center (302); Orangeburg, SC
January 10, 2022; 7:30 p.m.		Morgan State	L 81–88 ^{OT}	7–10 (0–2)	19 – Croskey	12 – Williams	6 – Madlock	SHM Memorial Center (500); Orangeburg, SC
January 18, 2022*; 6:00 p.m.		Morris	W 102–67	8–10	14 – 2 tied	13 – Brown	5 – Edwards	SHM Memorial Center (359); Orangeburg, SC
January 22, 2022; 4:00 p.m., FloSports		at Maryland Eastern Shore	W 69–60	9–10 (1–2)	16 – Davis	12 – Williams	4 – Edwards	Hytche Athletic Center (369); Princess Anne, MD
January 24, 2022; 7:30 p.m.		at Delaware State	W 64–62	10–10 (2–2)	12 – Madlock	10 – Oliver-Hampton	3 – Madlock	Memorial Hall (0); Dover, DE
January 29, 2022; 4:00 p.m.		Norfolk State	L 69–87	10–11 (2–3)	19 – Davis	9 – Williams	5 – Edwards	SHM Memorial Center (612); Orangeburg, SC
January 31, 2022; 7:30 p.m.		Howard	W 58–55	11–11 (3–3)	13 – Foster	12 – Brumant	3 – Robinson	SHM Memorial Center (614); Orangeburg, SC
February 7, 2022; 8:00 p.m.		North Carolina Central; Rescheduled from January 15	W 74–68	12–11 (4–3)	20 – Madlock	7 – Oliver-Hampton	3 – Edwards	SHM Memorial Center (384); Orangeburg, SC
February 12, 2022; 4:00 p.m.		at Coppin State	W 66–58	13–11 (5–3)	15 – Edwards	15 – Oliver-Hampton	5 – Madlock	Physical Education Complex (2,000); Baltimore, MD
February 14, 2022; 7:30 p.m.		at Morgan State	L 66–76	13–12 (5–4)	16 – Madlock	7 – Oliver-Hampton	5 – Edwards	Talmadge L. Hill Field House (1,789); Baltimore, MD
February 19, 2022; 4:00 p.m.		Maryland Eastern Shore	W 70–63	14–12 (6–4)	18 – Madlock	9 – Oliver-Hampton	7 – Madlock	SHM Memorial Center (275); Orangeburg, SC
February 21, 2022; 7:30 p.m.		Delaware State	W 79–74	15–12 (7–4)	21 – Madlock	12 – Davis	7 – Madlock	SHM Memorial Center (215); Orangeburg, SC
February 26, 2022; 6:00 p.m.		at Norfolk State	L 59–63	15–13 (7–5)	17 – Madlock	10 – Oliver-Hampton	3 – Edwards	Joseph G. Echols Memorial Hall (3,997); Norfolk, VA
February 28, 2022; 7:30 p.m.		at Howard	L 62–72	15–14 (7–6)	13 – Davis	15 – Williams	2 – 2 tied	Burr Gymnasium (2,178); Washington, D.C.
March 3, 2022; 7:30 p.m.		at North Carolina Central	L 62–67	15–15 (7–7)	23 – Madlock	6 – Oliver-Hampton	2 – tied	McDougald–McLendon Arena (3,083); Durham, NC
MEAC tournament
March 10, 2022; 6:00 p.m.	(5)	vs. (4) Morgan State; Quarterfinals	L 77–80	15–16	19 – Madlock	11 – Madlock	2 – tied	Norfolk Scope; Norfolk, VA
*Non-conference game. ^{#}Rankings from AP poll. (#) Tournament seedings in parentheses. All times are in Eastern.
