= 2021–22 Coppin State Eagles men's basketball team =

American college basketball season

2021–22 Coppin State Eagles men's basketball
- Conference: Mid-Eastern Athletic Conference
- Record: 9–22 (6–8 MEAC)
- Head coach: Juan Dixon (5th season)
- Associate head coach: John Auslander
- Assistant coaches: Charles Agumagu; Kent Auslander
- Home arena: Physical Education Complex

2021–22 MEAC men's basketball standings
	Conf.				Overall
Team	W		L	PCT	W		L	PCT
Norfolk State †	12	–	2	.857	24	–	7	.774
Howard	9	–	5	.643	16	–	13	.552
North Carolina Central	8	–	5	.615	16	–	15	.516
Morgan State	7	–	6	.538	13	–	15	.464
South Carolina State	7	–	7	.500	15	–	16	.484
Maryland Eastern Shore	6	–	8	.429	11	–	16	.407
Coppin State	6	–	8	.429	9	–	23	.281
Delaware State	0	–	14	.000	2	–	26	.071
† 2022 MEAC tournament winner

The 2021–22 Coppin State Eagles men's basketball team represented Coppin State University in the 2021–22 NCAA Division I men's basketball season. The Eagles, led by fifth-year head coach Juan Dixon, played their home games at the Physical Education Complex in Baltimore, Maryland as members of the Mid-Eastern Athletic Conference (MEAC).

== Previous season ==
The Eagles finished the 2020–21 season 9–13, 8–4 in MEAC play, to finish as MEAC North division co-champions, alongside Norfolk State. In the MEAC tournament, they were defeated by Morgan State in the semifinals.

== Roster ==
2021–22 Coppin State Eagles men's basketball team
Players
Coaches

Pos.	#	Name	Height	Weight	Year	Hometown
G/F	1	Justin Steers	6 ft 7 in (2.01 m)	205 lb (93 kg)	RS Jr	Philadelphia, PA
G	2	Mike Hood	6 ft 2 in (1.88 m)	195 lb (88 kg)	RS Jr	Kansas City, MO
G	4	Nendah Tarke	6 ft 4 in (1.93 m)	200 lb (91 kg)	RS Fr	Gaithersburg, MD
F	5	Nathaniel Stokes	6 ft 8 in (2.03 m)	210 lb (95 kg)	RS So	Tacoma, WA
G	11	Greg Spurlock	6 ft 5 in (1.96 m)	196 lb (89 kg)	Fr	Ashburn, VA
G	12	Kyle Cardaci	6 ft 2 in (1.88 m)	185 lb (84 kg)	RS So	Holmdel, NJ
G	13	Alex Rojas	6 ft 5 in (1.96 m)	210 lb (95 kg)	RS So	Gaithersburg, MD
F	20	Sita Conteh	6 ft 8 in (2.03 m)	195 lb (88 kg)	RS Sr	The Bronx, NY
F	21	Remy Lemovou	6 ft 9 in (2.06 m)	215 lb (98 kg)	RS So	Yaoundé, Cameroon
F	23	Tyree Corbett	6 ft 7 in (2.01 m)	200 lb (91 kg)	RS Jr	Philadelphia, PA
F	24	Daniel Titus	6 ft 8 in (2.03 m)	210 lb (95 kg)	RS So	Sydney, Australia
G	25	Isaiah Gross	6 ft 4 in (1.93 m)	210 lb (95 kg)	RS Fr	Lanham, MD
G	30	Reggie James	6 ft 4 in (1.93 m)	195 lb (88 kg)	RS So	Trenton, NJ
G	50	Jesse Zarzuela	6 ft 3 in (1.91 m)	180 lb (82 kg)	RS So	Houston, TX

Head coach

- Juan Dixon (Maryland)

Assistant coach(es)

- John Auslander (Maryland)
- Charles Agumagu (Barry)
- Kent Auslander (Coppin State)

Legend

- (C) Team captain
- (S) Suspended
- (I) Ineligible
- (W) Walk-on
- Injured
- Current redshirt

Roster
Last update: January 4, 2022

== Schedule and results ==
Date time, TV	Rank^{#}	Opponent^{#}	Result	Record	Site (attendance) city, state
Non-conference regular season
November 9, 2021*; 8:00 p.m., NBCSC/ESPN3		at Loyola–Chicago	L 45–103	0–1	Joseph J. Gentile Arena (2,982); Chicago, IL
November 10, 2021*; 9:00 p.m., FS1		at DePaul	L 72–97	0–2	Wintrust Arena (2,662); Chicago, IL
November 12, 2021*; 7:00 p.m., ESPN3		at Rider	L 69–81	0–3	Alumni Gymnasium (1,650); Lawrenceville, NJ
November 13, 2021*; 12:00 p.m., FS2		at No. 24 UConn	L 54–89	0–4	XL Center (9,690); Hartford, CT
November 15, 2021*; 7:00 p.m., ESPN+		at UNC Greensboro	L 48–55	0–5	Greensboro Coliseum (2,572); Greensboro, NC
November 17, 2021*; 7:00 p.m.		Loyola (MD)	W 71–49	1–5	Physical Education Complex (400); Baltimore, MD
November 19, 2021*; 7:00 p.m., BSSO/ACCNX		at Virginia	L 52–68	1–6	John Paul Jones Arena (12,960); Charlottesville, VA
November 22, 2021*; 7:00 p.m., ESPN+		at Cleveland State; Cerebro Sports Lake Erie Challenge	L 62–65	1–7	Wolstein Center (1,572); Cleveland, OH
November 24, 2021*; 2:00 p.m., ESPN3		at Canisius; Cerebro Sports Lake Erie Challenge	L 75–76	1–8	Koessler Athletic Center (801); Buffalo, NY
November 27, 2021*; 1:00 p.m., ESPN+		at East Carolina	L 68–70	1–9	Williams Arena (4,027); Greenville, NC
December 1, 2021*; 7:00 p.m., ESPN+		at St. Bonaventure	L 81–93	1–10	Reilly Center (2,976); St. Bonaventure, NY
December 3, 2021*; 7:00 p.m., ESPN+		at Cornell	L 77–92	1–11	Newman Arena (526); Ithaca, NY
December 8, 2021*; 2:00 p.m., ESPN+		at George Washington	L 62–75	1–12	Charles E. Smith Center (913); Washington, D.C.
December 11, 2021*; 3:00 p.m., Next Level Sports		Towson	L 75–89	1–13	Physical Education Complex (400); Baltimore, MD
December 14, 2021*; 8:00 p.m.		at Drexel	L 69–76	1–14	Daskalakis Athletic Center (1,155); Philadelphia, PA
December 23, 2021*; 4:00 p.m., ESPN+		at George Mason	Canceled due to positive COVID-19 tests		EagleBank Arena; Fairfax, VA
December 29, 2021*; 7:00 p.m., ESPN+		at Indiana State	Canceled due to positive COVID-19 tests		Hulman Center; Terre Haute, IN
MEAC regular season
January 8, 2022; 4:00 p.m.		at South Carolina State	W 74–65	2–14 (1–0)	SHM Memorial Center (302); Orangeburg, SC
January 15, 2022; 4:00 p.m.		at Morgan State	W 79–76	3–14 (2–0)	Talmadge L. Hill Field House (1,431); Baltimore, MD
January 22, 2022; 6:00 p.m.		at Norfolk State	L 77–84	3–15 (2–1)	Joseph G. Echols Memorial Hall (1,036); Norfolk, VA
January 24, 2022; 7:30 p.m., Next Level Sports		Howard	W 83–81	4–15 (3–1)	Physical Education Complex (517); Baltimore, MD
January 29, 2022; 4:00 p.m., Next Level Sports		Maryland Eastern Shore	L 61–64	4–16 (3–2)	Physical Education Complex (647); Baltimore, MD
February 2, 2022; 7:30 p.m.		at Delaware State	W 59–57	5–16 (4–2)	Memorial Hall (0); Dover, DE
February 5, 2022; 4:00 p.m.		at North Carolina Central; Rescheduled from January 10	L 68–69	5–17 (4–3)	McDougald–McLendon Arena (1,118); Durham, NC
February 12, 2022; 4:00 p.m., Next Level Sports		South Carolina State	L 58–66	5–18 (4–4)	Physical Education Complex (2,000); Baltimore, MD
February 14, 2022; 7:00 p.m., ESPNU		North Carolina Central	L 74–77	5–19 (4–5)	Physical Education Complex (512); Baltimore, MD
February 19, 2022; 4:00 p.m., Next Level Sports		Norfolk State	L 59–89	5–20 (4–6)	Physical Education Complex (545); Baltimore, MD
February 21, 2022; 7:00 p.m., ESPNU		at Howard	W 86–82	6–20 (5–6)	Burr Gymnasium (1,152); Washington, D.C.
February 26, 2022; 4:00 p.m.		at Maryland Eastern Shore	L 50–70	6–21 (5–7)	Hytche Athletic Center (750); Princess Anne, MD
February 28, 2022; 7:30 p.m., Next Level Sports		Delaware State	W 80–67	7–21 (6–7)	Physical Education Complex (440); Baltimore, MD
March 3, 2022; 7:30 p.m., Next Level Sports		Morgan State	L 59–63	7–22 (6–8)	Physical Education Complex (2,100); Baltimore, MD
MEAC tournament
March 9, 2022; 8:00 p.m., ESPN+	(7)	vs. (2) Howard; Quarterfinals	W 59–57	8–22	Norfolk Scope; Norfolk, VA
March 11, 2022; 8:30 p.m., ESPN+	(7)	vs. (3) North Carolina Central; Semifinals	W 79–73	9–22	Norfolk Scope; Norfolk, VA
March 12, 2022; 1:00 p.m., ESPN2	(7)	vs. (1) Norfolk State; Championship	L 57–72	9–23	Norfolk Scope; Norfolk, VA
*Non-conference game. ^{#}Rankings from AP poll. (#) Tournament seedings in parentheses. All times are in Eastern.
