= 2021–22 Howard Bison men's basketball team =

American college basketball season

2021–22 Howard Bison men's basketball
- Conference: Mid-Eastern Athletic Conference
- Record: 16–13 (9–5 MEAC)
- Head coach: Kenny Blakeney (3rd season)
- Associate head coach: Rod Balanis
- Assistant coaches: Tyler Thornton; Steve Ongley
- Home arena: Burr Gymnasium

2021–22 MEAC men's basketball standings
| | Conf. | | | | Overall |
| Team | W | | L | PCT | W | | L | PCT |
|---|---|---|---|---|---|---|---|---|
| Norfolk State † | 12 | – | 2 | .857 | 24 | – | 7 | .774 |
| Howard | 9 | – | 5 | .643 | 16 | – | 13 | .552 |
| North Carolina Central | 8 | – | 5 | .615 | 16 | – | 15 | .516 |
| Morgan State | 7 | – | 6 | .538 | 13 | – | 15 | .464 |
| South Carolina State | 7 | – | 7 | .500 | 15 | – | 16 | .484 |
| Maryland Eastern Shore | 6 | – | 8 | .429 | 11 | – | 16 | .407 |
| Coppin State | 6 | – | 8 | .429 | 9 | – | 23 | .281 |
| Delaware State | 0 | – | 14 | .000 | 2 | – | 26 | .071 |
† 2022 MEAC tournament winner

The 2021–22 Howard Bison men's basketball team represented Howard University in the 2021–22 NCAA Division I men's basketball season. The Bison, led by third-year head coach Kenny Blakeney, played their home games at Burr Gymnasium in Washington, D.C. as members of the Mid-Eastern Athletic Conference (MEAC).

== Previous season ==
The Bison finished the 2020–21 season 1–4, 0–0 in MEAC play, before suspending their season on February 9, 2021 due to an abundance of positive cases amongst their players amid the COVID-19 pandemic.

== Roster ==
2021–22 Howard Bison men's basketball team
Players
Coaches

| Pos. | # | Name | Height | Weight | Year | Previous school | Hometown |
|---|---|---|---|---|---|---|---|
| G | 0 | Khalil Robinson | 6 ft 0 in (1.83 m) | 160 lb (73 kg) | Jr | Gray Collegiate Academy | Columbia, SC |
| F | 1 | Dontarius James | 6 ft 8 in (2.03 m) | 225 lb (102 kg) | Sr | Jacksonville | Kershaw, SC |
| F | 2 | Steve III Settle | 6 ft 10 in (2.08 m) | 175 lb (79 kg) | RS So | DeMatha Catholic HS | Glenarden, MD |
| G | 3 | Elijah Hawkins | 5 ft 11 in (1.8 m) | 160 lb (73 kg) | Fr | DeMatha Catholic HS | Washington, D.C. |
| F | 4 | Sam Green | 6 ft 6 in (1.98 m) | 230 lb (104 kg) | GS | Drexel | Bowie, MD |
| G | 10 | Deven Richmond | 6 ft 4 in (1.93 m) | 190 lb (86 kg) | Sr | Howard CC | Bowie, MD |
| G | 11 | Kyle Foster | 6 ft 5 in (1.96 m) | 172 lb (78 kg) | GS | Bethel HS | Hampton, VA |
| G | 13 | Thomas Weaver | 5 ft 10 in (1.78 m) | 165 lb (75 kg) | So | Riverdale Baptist School | Upper Marlboro, MD |
| F | 20 | Randall Brumant | 6 ft 7 in (2.01 m) | 220 lb (100 kg) | GS | Columbia | Houston, TX |
| F | 22 | Aljaz Vidmar | 6 ft 9 in (2.06 m) | 210 lb (95 kg) | Fr | Selfoss Karfa | Slovenia |
| F | 24 | Jordan Wood | 6 ft 9 in (2.06 m) | 200 lb (91 kg) | So | Cornerstone Christian | San Antonio, TX |
| G | 33 | Tai Bibbs | 6 ft 3 in (1.91 m) | 190 lb (86 kg) | GS | Columbia | Chicago, IL |
| G | 34 | Bryce Harris | 6 ft 4 in (1.93 m) | 220 lb (100 kg) | Fr | Putnam Science | Brentwood, NY |
| F | 35 | Miles Stewart | 6 ft 7 in (2.01 m) | 195 lb (88 kg) | Fr | Lake Highland Prep | Orlando, FL |
| F | | Ayodele Taiwo | 6 ft 9 in (2.06 m) | 250 lb (113 kg) | Fr | NBA Academy Africa | Lagos, Nigeria |

Head coach

- Kenny Blakeney (Duke)

Assistant coach(es)

- Rod Balanis (Georgia Tech)
- Tyler Thornton (Duke)
- Steve Ongley (Southern Connecticut)

Legend

- (C) Team captain
- (S) Suspended
- (I) Ineligible
- (W) Walk-on
- Injured
- Current redshirt

Roster
Last update: November 10, 2021

== Schedule and results ==
| Date time, TV | Rank^{#} | Opponent^{#} | Result | Record | High points | High rebounds | High assists | Site (attendance) city, state |
Exhibition
| October 28, 2021*; 6:00 p.m. | | Virginia State | W 84–80 | – | 18 – Harris | 7 – Richmond | 3 – 2 tied | Burr Gymnasium; Washington, D.C. |
| November 1, 2021*; 7:00 p.m. | | Bowie State | W 88–67 | – | 14 – 2 tied | 8 – Settle | 4 – Foster | Burr Gymnasium; Washington, D.C. |
Regular season
| November 9, 2021*; 7:00 p.m. | | District of Columbia | W 87–59 | 1–0 | 23 – Hawkins | 11 – Green | 6 – Hawkins | Burr Gymnasium (1,514); Washington, D.C. |
| November 10, 2021*; 5:00 p.m. | | Regent | W 118–54 | 2–0 | 26 – Harris | 9 – Harris | 8 – Bibbs | Burr Gymnasium; Washington, D.C. |
| November 13, 2021*; 2:00 p.m., ESPN+ | | at Bradley | W 76–64 | 3–0 | 16 – Foster | 10 – Brumant | 6 – Hawkins | Carver Arena (3,814); Peoria, IL |
| November 16, 2021*; 6:30 p.m., FS2 | | at No. 5 Villanova | L 81–100 | 3–1 | 19 – Foster | 4 – Richmond | 11 – Hawkins | Finneran Pavilion (6,501); Villanova, PA |
| November 20, 2021*; 2:00 p.m., ESPN+ | | at High Point; Legends Classic at High Point | L 63–73 | 3–2 | 21 – Settle | 6 – 2 tied | 6 – Hawkins | Qubein Center (3,957); High Point, NC |
| November 21, 2021*; 5:00 p.m., ESPN+ | | vs. William & Mary; Legends Classic at High Point | W 82–76 | 4–2 | 19 – Settle | 7 – 2 tied | 11 – Hawkins | Qubein Center (1,230); High Point, NC |
| November 26, 2021*; 3:00 p.m. | | Austin Peay | L 67–69 | 4–3 | 12 – 2 tied | 5 – 3 tied | 6 – Hawkins | Burr Gymnasium (551); Washington, D.C. |
| November 30, 2021*; 7:00 p.m., NEC Front Row | | at Mount St. Mary's | L 70–72 | 4–4 | 19 – Hawkins | 5 – 2 tied | 6 – Hawkins | Knott Arena (1,617); Emmitsburg, MD |
| December 4, 2021*; 5:30 p.m., HBCUGO.TV | | American | W 90–56 | 5–4 | 19 – Settle | 7 – Settle | 6 – Hawkins | Burr Gymnasium (612); Washington, D.C. |
| December 15, 2021*; 6:30 p.m., FS1 | | at Georgetown | L 73–85 | 5–5 | 26 – Foster | 8 – Foster | 5 – Hawkins | Capital One Arena (4,154); Washington, D.C. |
| December 18, 2021*; 4:00 p.m., TNT | | vs. North Carolina A&T; Invesco QQQ Legacy Classic | W 79–57 | 6–5 | 18 – Foster | 9 – 2 tied | 10 – Hawkins | Prudential Center; Newark, NJ |
| December 21, 2021*; 7:00 p.m., ESPN+ | | at Harvard | L 69–77 | 6–6 | 18 – Settle | 8 – Brumant | 4 – Hawkins | Lavietes Pavilion (1,006); Allston, MA |
| December 23, 2021*; 2:00 p.m., ESPN+ | | at Yale | Canceled due to COVID-19 issues at Howard | | | | | John J. Lee Amphitheater; New Haven, CT |
| December 30, 2021*; 7:00 p.m., ESPN+ | | at Hampton | Canceled due to COVID-19 issues at Howard | | | | | Hampton Convocation Center; Hampton, VA |
| January 4, 2022*; 7:00 p.m., ESPN+ | | at Penn | Canceled due to COVID-19 issues at Howard | | | | | The Palestra; Philadelphia, PA |
| January 15, 2022; 4:00 p.m. | | Norfolk State | L 74–77 | 6–7 (0–1) | 22 – Foster | 9 – Foster | 3 – Hawkins | Burr Gymnasium (735); Washington, D.C. |
| January 17, 2022*; 2:30 p.m., FOX | | Notre Dame; MLK Day Classic | L 68–71 | 6–8 | 25 – Settle | 7 – Settle | 5 – Hawkins | Burr Gymnasium (1,315); Washington, D.C. |
| January 22, 2022; 4:00 p.m. | | at Morgan State | W 91–82 | 7–8 (1–1) | 22 – Brumant | 8 – Settle | 4 – Hawkins | Talmadge L. Hill Field House (1,987); Baltimore, MD |
| January 24, 2022; 7:30 p.m. | | at Coppin State | L 81–83 | 7–9 (1–2) | 19 – Foster | 8 – Settle | 3 – Foster | Physical Education Complex (517); Baltimore, MD |
| January 29, 2022; 4:00 p.m. | | at North Carolina Central | W 75–74 ^{OT} | 8–9 (2–2) | 27 – Foster | 4 – Richmond | 7 – Hawkins | McDougald–McLendon Arena (2,337); Durham, NC |
| January 31, 2022; 7:00 p.m. | | at South Carolina State | L 55–58 | 8–10 (2–3) | 13 – Foster | 12 – Bruman | 3 – Robinson | SHM Memorial Center (614); Orangeburg, SC |
| February 5, 2022; 4:00 p.m. | | Maryland Eastern Shore; Rescheduled from January 10 | W 72–64 | 9–10 (3–3) | 20 – Foster | 5 – Bibbs | 8 – Hawkins | Burr Gymnasium (1,271); Washington, D.C. |
| February 7, 2022; 7:30 p.m. | | at Delaware State; Rescheduled from January 8 | W 69–64 | 10–10 (4–3) | 21 – Settle | 7 – Hawkins | 5 – tied | Memorial Hall (600); Dover, DE |
| February 8, 2022*; 6:00 p.m. | | Gallaudet | W 96–38 | 11–10 | 21 – Settle | 8 – Wood | 5 – Hawkins | Burr Gymnasium (818); Washington, D.C. |
| February 12, 2022; 4:00 p.m. | | Delaware State | W 85–72 | 12–10 (5–3) | 27 – Foster | 6 – Hawkins | 9 – Hawkins | Burr Gymnasium (1,164); Washington, D.C. |
| February 14, 2022; 7:30 p.m., FloSports | | at Maryland Eastern Shore | W 77–71 | 13–10 (6–3) | 22 – Foster | 5 – Wood | 8 – Hawkins | Hytche Athletic Center (747); Princess Anne, MD |
| February 19, 2022; 2:00 p.m., TNT/ESPN2/NBA TV | | vs. Morgan State; NBA HBCU Classic | W 68–66 | 14–10 (7–3) | 18 – Foster | 9 – Settle | 5 – Hawkins | Wolstein Center (4,732); Cleveland, OH |
| February 21, 2022; 7:30 p.m., ESPNU | | Coppin State | L 82–86 | 14–11 (7–4) | 27 – Foster | 6 – tied | 7 – Hawkins | Burr Gymnasium; Washington, D.C. |
| February 26, 2022; 4:00 p.m. | | North Carolina Central | W 77–67 | 15–11 (8–4) | 17 – Hawkins | 6 – Foster | 3 – Hawkins | Burr Gymnasium (1,994); Washington, D.C. |
| February 28, 2022; 7:30 p.m. | | South Carolina State | W 72–62 | 16–11 (9–4) | 15 – Hawkins | 7 – Foster | 3 – Foster | Burr Gymnasium (2,178); Washington, D.C. |
| March 3, 2022; 7:30 p.m. | | at Norfolk State | L 61–83 | 16–12 (9–5) | 15 – Settle | 4 – Settle | 2 – Hawkins | Joseph G. Echols Memorial Hall (2,897); Norfolk, VA |
MEAC tournament
| March 9, 2022; 8:00 p.m., ESPN+ | (2) | vs. (7) Coppin State; Quarterfinals | L 57–59 | 16–13 | 16 – Settle | 12 – Settle | 4 – Hawkins | Norfolk Scope; Norfolk, VA |
*Non-conference game. ^{#}Rankings from AP poll. (#) Tournament seedings in parentheses. All times are in Eastern.
