= 2021–22 North Carolina Central Eagles men's basketball team =

American college basketball season

2021–22 North Carolina Central Eagles men's basketball
- Conference: Mid-Eastern Athletic Conference
- Record: 16–15 (8–5 MEAC)
- Head coach: LeVelle Moton (13th season)
- Assistant coaches: Reggie Sharp; Nigel Thomas; Andre Gray
- Home arena: McDougald–McLendon Arena

2021–22 MEAC men's basketball standings
	Conf.				Overall
Team	W		L	PCT	W		L	PCT
Norfolk State †	12	–	2	.857	24	–	7	.774
Howard	9	–	5	.643	16	–	13	.552
North Carolina Central	8	–	5	.615	16	–	15	.516
Morgan State	7	–	6	.538	13	–	15	.464
South Carolina State	7	–	7	.500	15	–	16	.484
Maryland Eastern Shore	6	–	8	.429	11	–	16	.407
Coppin State	6	–	8	.429	9	–	23	.281
Delaware State	0	–	14	.000	2	–	26	.071
† 2022 MEAC tournament winner

The 2021–22 North Carolina Central Eagles men's basketball team represented North Carolina Central University in the 2021–22 NCAA Division I men's basketball season. The Eagles, led by 13th-year head coach LeVelle Moton, played their home games at McDougald–McLendon Arena in Durham, North Carolina as members of the Mid-Eastern Athletic Conference.

== Previous season ==
The Eagles finished the 2020–21 season 5–9, 3–5 in MEAC play to finish in third place in the Southern Division. In the MEAC tournament, they lost to Norfolk State in the quarterfinals.

== Roster ==
2021–22 North Carolina Central Eagles men's basketball team
Players
Coaches

Pos.	#	Name	Height	Weight	Year	Hometown
G	0	Alex Caldwell	6 ft 0 in (1.83 m)	160 lb (73 kg)	Sr	Columbia, SC
G	1	Ja'Darius Harris	6 ft 2 in (1.88 m)	173 lb (78 kg)	Jr	Trenton, TN
F	2	Kris Monroe	6 ft 8 in (2.03 m)	212 lb (96 kg)	Sr	Raleigh, NC
G	3	Asanti Price	6 ft 5 in (1.96 m)	170 lb (77 kg)	Jr	Columbia, SC
F	4	Dontavius King	6 ft 7 in (2.01 m)	240 lb (109 kg)	Sr	Greenville, SC
G	5	Justin Wright	6 ft 1 in (1.85 m)	200 lb (91 kg)	So	Greenville, NC
F	10	Samuel Keita	6 ft 10 in (2.08 m)	216 lb (98 kg)	Jr	London, England
G	11	Marque Maultsby	6 ft 3 in (1.91 m)	165 lb (75 kg)	Jr	Raleigh, NC
G	13	Terrence Crawford	6 ft 2 in (1.88 m)	170 lb (77 kg)	Fr	Graham, NC
F	21	Eric Boone	6 ft 2 in (1.88 m)	190 lb (86 kg)	RS Jr	Lexington, KY
G	22	Chris Daniels	6 ft 0 in (1.83 m)	175 lb (79 kg)	Fr	Raleigh, NC
F	23	Cameron Butler	6 ft 10 in (2.08 m)	205 lb (93 kg)	Jr	Chicago, IL
G	24	Nicolas Fennell	6 ft 4 in (1.93 m)	160 lb (73 kg)	RS Sr	Bowie, MD
F	25	Timmy Adedire	6 ft 3 in (1.91 m)	185 lb (84 kg)	Fr	Baltimore, MD
G	44	Randy Miller Jr.	6 ft 2 in (1.88 m)	182 lb (83 kg)	RS Sr	Odenton, MD

Head coach

- LeVelle Moton (North Carolina Central)

Assistant coach(es)

- Reggie Sharp (Auburn)
- Nigel Thomas (Langston)
- Andre Gray (Methodist)

Legend

- (C) Team captain
- (S) Suspended
- (I) Ineligible
- (W) Walk-on
- Injured
- Current redshirt

Roster
Last update: December 8, 2021

== Schedule and results ==
Date time, TV	Rank^{#}	Opponent^{#}	Result	Record	High points	High rebounds	High assists	Site (attendance) city, state
Regular season
November 9, 2021*; 7:00 pm, ESPN+		at Richmond	L 60–70	0–1	17 – Caldwell	7 – Monroe	5 – Caldwell	Robins Center (6,173); Richmond, VA
November 13, 2021*; 7:00 pm, ESPN+		at Memphis	L 51–90	0–2	13 – Boone	6 – Butler	2 – Maultsby	FedExForum (12,893); Memphis, TN
November 16, 2021*; 9:00 pm, BTN		at Iowa	L 69–86	0–3	15 – Miller Jr.	8 – Maultsby	5 – Boone	Carver–Hawkeye Arena (9,132); Iowa City, IA
November 20, 2021*; 8:00 pm, Hornet Sports Network		at Alabama State	L 74–80 ^{OT}	0–4	23 – Miller Jr.	6 – King	5 – Boone	Dunn–Oliver Acadome (932); Montgomery, AL
November 23, 2021*; 7:00 pm, NCCU Sports Network		Warren Wilson	W 110–32	1–4	15 – Caldwell	8 – Monroe	5 – Caldwell	McDougald–McLendon Arena (522); Durham, NC
November 27, 2021*; 3:00 pm, NCCU Sports Network		Apprentice School	W 96–56	2–4	13 – 2 Tied	7 – Butler	5 – 2 Tied	McDougald–McLendon Arena (446); Durham, NC
November 29, 2021*; 7:00 pm, ESPN+		at Gardner–Webb	L 58–83	2–5	9 – 2 Tied	7 – Boone	2 – 2 Tied	Paul Porter Arena (504); Boiling Springs, NC
December 1, 2021*; 6:00 pm, ESPN+		at USC Upstate	W 67–65	3–5	20 – Boone	8 – Butler	3 – Boone	G. B. Hodge Center (412); Spartanburg, SC
December 4, 2021*; 2:00 pm, ESPN+		at UNC Asheville	L 66–82	3–6	18 – Miller Jr.	6 – Boone	5 – Boone	Kimmel Arena (580); Asheville, NC
December 6, 2021*; 7:00 pm, ESPN+		at The Citadel	L 67–80	3–7	16 – King	10 – King	4 – Wright	McAlister Field House (711); Charleston, SC
December 9, 2021*; 7:00 pm, NCCU Sports Network		Carver	W 102–50	4–7	20 – Wright	11 – Monroe	7 – Wright	McDougald–McLendon Arena (387); Durham, NC
December 15, 2021*; 7:00 pm, NCCU Sports Network		Gardner–Webb	W 72–71	5–7	17 – Monroe	9 – King	4 – Boone	McDougald–McLendon Arena (462); Durham, NC
December 18, 2021*; 1:00 pm, TNT		vs. Delaware State; Invesco QQQ Legacy Classic	W 86–53	6–7	23 – Miller Jr.	7 – Monroe	13 – Boone	Prudential Center; Newark, NJ
December 21, 2021*; 9:00 pm, YouTube		at UTEP; Don Haskins Sun Bowl Invitational	L 61–70	6–8	15 – Miller Jr.	9 – Wright	4 – Wright	Don Haskins Center (4,047); El Paso, TX
December 22, 2021*; 7:00 pm, YouTube		vs. Sam Houston State; Don Haskins Sun Bowl Invitational	L 51–68	6–9	15 – Harris	8 – Maultsby	4 – Boone	Don Haskins Center; El Paso, TX
January 5, 2022*; 7:00 pm, NCCU Sports Network		Mid-Atlantic Christian	Canceled due to COVID-19 protocols					McDougald–McLendon Arena; Durham, NC
January 8, 2022; 4:00 pm, NCCU Sports Network		Morgan State	Postponed due to COVID-19 issues					McDougald–McLendon Arena; Durham, NC
January 22, 2022; 4:30 pm, DESU-TV		at Delaware State	W 73–49	7–9 (1–0)	22 – Miller Jr.	7 – King	5 – Wright	Memorial Hall (0); Dover, DE
January 24, 2022; 7:30 pm, FloHoops		at Maryland Eastern Shore	W 75–63	8–9 (2–0)	21 – Wright	6 – Wright	5 – Wright	Hytche Athletic Center (0); Princess Anne, MD
January 29, 2022; 4:00 pm, NCCU Sports Network		Howard	L 74–75 ^{OT}	8–10 (2–1)	17 – Wright	12 – King	3 – Boone	McDougald–McLendon Arena (2,337); Durham, NC
January 31, 2022; 7:30 pm, ESPNU		Norfolk State	W 70–67	9–10 (3–1)	20 – Wright	7 – Monroe	5 – Fennell	McDougald–McLendon Arena (2,878); Durham, NC
February 5, 2022; 4:00 pm, NCCU Sports Network		Coppin State; Rescheduled from Jan. 10	W 69–68	10–10 (4–1)	25 – Wright	12 – Monroe	3 – Maultsby	McDougald–McLendon Arena (1,118); Durham, NC
February 7, 2022; 8:00 pm, YouTube		at South Carolina State; Rescheduled from Jan. 15	L 68–74	10–11 (4–2)	28 – Boone	8 – Boone	4 – Boone	SHM Memorial Center (384); Orangeburg, SC
February 10, 2022*; 6:00 pm		Warren Wilson	W 115–43	11–11	22 – Harris	11 – Butler	6 – Boone	McDougald–McLendon Arena (1,277); Durham, NC
February 12, 2022; 3:00 pm, Morgan State All Access		at Morgan State	W 74–64	12–11 (5–2)	24 – Wright	9 – Wright	6 – Boone	Talmadge L. Hill Field House (0); Baltimore, MD
February 14, 2022; 7:30 pm, ESPNU		at Coppin State	W 77–74	13–11 (6–2)	21 – Monroe	11 – Monroe	4 – Boone	Physical Education Complex (512); Baltimore, MD
February 19, 2022; 4:00 pm, NCCU Sports Network		Delaware State	W 84–79 ^{OT}	14–11 (7–2)	32 – Wright	9 – Wright	7 – Boone	McDougald–McLendon Arena (2,127); Durham, NC
February 21, 2022; 7:30 pm, NCCU Sports Network		Maryland Eastern Shore	L 66–79	14–12 (7–3)	23 – Monroe	8 – Boone	4 – Wright	McDougald–McLendon Arena (2,273); Durham, NC
February 26, 2022; 4:00 pm, Bison Live		at Howard	L 67–77	14–13 (7–4)	29 – Boone	9 – Monroe	2 – Boone	Burr Gymnasium (1,994); Washington, D.C.
February 28, 2022; 7:30 pm		at Norfolk State	L 46–75	14–14 (7–5)	18 – Boone	7 – Butler	1 – Tied	Joseph G. Echols Memorial Hall (2,646); Norfolk, VA
March 3, 2022; 7:30 pm, NCCU Sports Network		South Carolina State	W 67–62	15–14 (8–5)	24 – Wright	12 – Boone	4 – Monroe	McDougald–McLendon Arena (3,083); Durham, NC
MEAC tournament
March 10, 2022; 8:00 pm, ESPN+	(3)	vs. (6) Maryland Eastern Shore; Quarterfinals	W 68–56	16–14	14 – Wright	7 – Fennell	3 – Tied	Norfolk Scope; Norfolk, VA
March 11, 2022; 8:00 pm, ESPN+	(3)	vs. (7) Coppin State; Semifinals	L 73–79	16–15	16 – Monroe	10 – Butler	4 – Wright	Norfolk Scope; Norfolk, VA
*Non-conference game. ^{#}Rankings from AP Poll. (#) Tournament seedings in parentheses. All times are in Eastern.
