= 2021–22 Miami Hurricanes men's basketball team =

2021–22 Miami Hurricanes men's basketball

NCAA tournament, Elite Eight
- Conference: Atlantic Coast Conference

Ranking
- Coaches: No. 16
- Record: 26–11 (14–6 ACC)
- Head coach: Jim Larrañaga (11th season)
- Associate head coach: Chris Caputo
- Assistant coaches: Bill Courtney; D.J. Irving
- Home arena: Watsco Center

2021–22 ACC men's basketball standings
	Conf.				Overall
Team	W		L	PCT	W		L	PCT
No. 9 Duke	16	–	4	.800	32	–	7	.821
North Carolina	15	–	5	.750	29	–	10	.744
Notre Dame	15	–	5	.750	24	–	11	.686
Miami (FL)	14	–	6	.700	26	–	11	.703
Wake Forest	13	–	7	.650	25	–	10	.714
Virginia	12	–	8	.600	21	–	14	.600
Virginia Tech †	11	–	9	.550	23	–	13	.639
Florida State	10	–	10	.500	17	–	14	.548
Syracuse	9	–	11	.450	16	–	17	.485
Clemson	8	–	12	.400	17	–	16	.515
Louisville	6	–	14	.300	13	–	19	.406
Boston College	6	–	14	.300	13	–	20	.394
Pittsburgh	6	–	14	.300	11	–	21	.344
Georgia Tech	5	–	15	.250	12	–	20	.375
NC State	4	–	16	.200	11	–	21	.344
† 2022 ACC tournament winner Rankings from AP poll

The 2021–22 Miami Hurricanes men's basketball team represented the University of Miami during the 2021–22 NCAA Division I men's basketball season. Led by eleventh-year head coach Jim Larrañaga, they played their home games at the Watsco Center on the university's campus in Coral Gables, Florida as members of the Atlantic Coast Conference (ACC).

The Hurricanes finished the season 26–11, 14–6 in ACC play to finish in fourth place. In the ACC Tournament they defeated Boston College in the quarterfinals before losing to eventual runners-up Duke in the semifinals. They received an at-large bid to the NCAA Tournament, where they defeated USC, Auburn and Iowa State to advance to the first Elite Eight in school history, where they lost to the eventual National Champion Kansas Jayhawks.

== Previous season ==
The Hurricanes finished the 2020–21 season 10–17, 4–15 in ACC play to finish in thirteenth place. In the ACC tournament they defeated Pittsburgh in the first round, and Clemson in the second round, before losing to eventual champions Georgia Tech in the quarterfinals. They were not invited to either the NCAA tournament or NIT.

== Offseason ==
=== Departures ===
Departures
Name	Number	Pos.	Height	Weight	Year	Hometown	Reason for departure
Chris Lykes	0	G	5'7"	160	Senior	Mitchellville, MD	Transferred to Arkansas
Nysier Brooks	3	C	7'0"	240	RS senior	Philadelphia, PA	Transferred to Ole Miss
Elijah Olaniyi	4	G	6'5"	205	Senior	Newark, NJ	Transferred to Stony Brook
Earl Timberlake	13	G	6'6"	215	Freshman	Washington, D.C.	Transferred to Memphis
Willie Herenton	15	G	6'2"	180	Senior	Lincolnshire, IL	Walk-on; left the team
Matt Cross	33	F	6'7"	225	Freshman	Beverly, MA	Transferred to Louisville

=== Incoming transfers ===
Incoming transfers
Name	Number	Pos.	Height	Weight	Year	Hometown	Previous school
Charlie Moore	3	G	5'11"	180	Graduate student	Chicago, IL	DePaul
Jordan Miller	11	G	6'7"	195	RS junior	Middleburg, VA	George Mason

=== 2021 recruiting class ===
College recruiting
Name	Hometown	School	Height	Weight	Commit date
Bensley Joseph #14 PG	Putnam, CT	Putnam Science Academy	6 ft 0 in (1.83 m)	170 lb (77 kg)	Jul 27, 2020
Bensley Joseph #14 PG	Recruit ratings: Rivals: 247Sports: ESPN: (83)				
Jakai Robinson #20 SF	Fort Washington, MD	National Christian Academy	6 ft 4 in (1.93 m)	190 lb (86 kg)	Oct 4, 2020
Jakai Robinson #20 SF	Recruit ratings: Rivals: 247Sports: ESPN: (83)				
Wooga Poplar #40 SG	Philadelphia, PA	Math, Civics and Sciences Charter School	6 ft 4 in (1.93 m)	185 lb (84 kg)	Sep 15, 2020
Wooga Poplar #40 SG	Recruit ratings: Rivals: 247Sports: ESPN: (79)				
Overall recruit ranking: Rivals: 48
Note: In many cases, Scout, Rivals, 247Sports, On3, and ESPN may conflict in their listings of height and weight.; In these cases, the average was taken. ESPN grades are on a 100-point scale.; Sources: "Miami 2021 Basketball Commitments". Rivals.; "Miami Hurricanes". ESPN.; "2021 Team Ranking". Rivals.

== Roster ==
2021–22 Miami Hurricanes men's basketball team
Players
Coaches

Pos.	#	Name	Height	Weight	Year	Hometown
F	1	Anthony Walker	6 ft 9 in (2.06 m)	215 lb (98 kg)	RS So	Baltimore, MD
G	2	Isaiah Wong	6 ft 3 in (1.91 m)	185 lb (84 kg)	RS So	Piscataway, NJ
G	3	Charlie Moore	5 ft 11 in (1.8 m)	180 lb (82 kg)	GS	Chicago, IL
G	4	Bensley Joseph	6 ft 1 in (1.85 m)	195 lb (88 kg)	Fr	Arlington, MA
G	5	Harlond Beverly (injured)	6 ft 5 in (1.96 m)	195 lb (88 kg)	RS So	Detroit, MI
G	10	Filippos Gkogkos (W)	6 ft 3 in (1.91 m)	193 lb (88 kg)	Jr	Athens, Greece
G	11	Jordan Miller	6 ft 7 in (2.01 m)	195 lb (88 kg)	RS Jr	Middleburg, VA
G	13	Jakai Robinson (redshirt)	6 ft 4 in (1.93 m)	200 lb (91 kg)	Fr	Ossining, NY
C	14	Rodney Miller Jr.	7 ft 0 in (2.13 m)	235 lb (107 kg)	GS	Laurelton, NY
F	21	Sam Waardenburg	6 ft 10 in (2.08 m)	225 lb (102 kg)	GS	Auckland, New Zealand
F	22	Deng Gak	6 ft 11 in (2.11 m)	220 lb (100 kg)	RS Jr	Sydney, Australia
G	23	Kameron McGusty	6 ft 5 in (1.96 m)	190 lb (86 kg)	GS	Katy, TX
F	32	Thomas Oosterbroek (W)	6 ft 7 in (2.01 m)	235 lb (107 kg)	Fr	Amsterdam, Netherlands
G	55	Wooga Poplar	6 ft 5 in (1.96 m)	195 lb (88 kg)	Fr	Philadelphia, PA

Head coach

- Jim Larrañaga (Providence)

Assistant coach(es)

- Chris Caputo (Westfield State)
- Bill Courtney (Bucknell)
- D.J. Irving (Boston University)

Legend

- (C) Team captain
- (S) Suspended
- (I) Ineligible
- (W) Walk-on
- Injured
- Current redshirt

Roster

== Schedule and results ==
Date time, TV	Rank^{#}	Opponent^{#}	Result	Record	High points	High rebounds	High assists	Site (attendance) city, state
Exhibition
Oct 20, 2021*; 7:00 p.m., ACCNX		Nova Southeastern	W 106–95	–	40 – Wong	8 – McGusty	8 – McGusty	Watsco Center; Coral Gables, FL
Regular season
Nov 9, 2021*; 7:30 p.m., ACCNX		Canisius	W 77–67	1–0	20 – McGusty	10 – McGusty	4 – 3 tied	Watsco Center (3,234); Coral Gables, FL
Nov 13, 2021*; 1:00 p.m., ACCNX		UCF	L 89–95	1–1	28 – McGusty	5 – Wong	3 – Wong	Watsco Center (2,950); Coral Gables, FL
Nov 16, 2021*; 6:00 p.m., CBSSN		at Florida Atlantic	W 68–66	2–1	18 – Wong	8 – McGusty	1 – 4 tied	FAU Arena (2,772); Boca Raton, FL
Nov 21, 2021*; 8:00 p.m., ACCN		Florida A&M	W 86–59	3–1	20 – Moore	8 – Waardenburg	4 – Tied	Watsco Center (3,175); Coral Gables, FL
Nov 25, 2021*; 12:00 p.m., ESPN2		vs. Dayton; ESPN Events Invitational Quarterfinals	L 60–76	3–2	10 – Wong	5 – J. Miller	2 – Tied	HP Field House (3,514); Kissimmee, FL
Nov 26, 2021*; 11:00 a.m., ESPN2		vs. North Texas; ESPN Events Invitational Consolation 2nd Round	W 69–63	4–2	21 – Wong	12 – McGusty	3 – Moore	HP Field House (3,859); Kissimmee, FL
Nov 28, 2021*; 6:30 p.m., ESPNU		vs. No. 10 Alabama; ESPN Events Invitational 5th Place	L 64–96	4–3	24 – McGusty	10 – McGusty	3 – Wong	HP Field House (3,127); Kissimmee, FL
Dec 1, 2021*; 9:15 p.m., ESPNU		at Penn State; Big Ten-ACC Challenge	W 63–58	5–3	14 – Waardenburg	5 – Tied	4 – Moore	Bryce Jordan Center (8,221); University Park, PA
Dec 4, 2021; 12:00 p.m., ACCN		Clemson	W 80–75	6–3 (1–0)	18 – Waardenburg	4 – McGusty	5 – Moore	Watsco Center (3,388); Coral Gables, FL
Dec 8, 2021*; 7:00 p.m., ACCN		Lipscomb	W 76–59	7–3	29 – McGusty	8 – J. Miller	4 – Tied	Watsco Center (2,753); Coral Gables, FL
Dec 12, 2021*; 11:30 a.m., FloHoops		vs. Fordham; Basketball Hall of Fame Invitational	W 72–66	8–3	18 – Moore	9 – J. Miller	2 – Tied	Barclays Center (0); Brooklyn, NY
Dec 20, 2021*; 7:00 p.m., ACCRSN		Stetson	W 82–72	9–3	27 – McGusty	11 – J. Miller	8 – Moore	Watsco Center (2,232); Coral Gables, FL
Dec 29, 2021; 9:00 p.m., ESPNU		NC State	W 91–83	10–3 (2–0)	25 – J. Miller	11 – McGusty	5 – McGusty	Watsco Center (3,014); Coral Gables, FL
Jan 1, 2022; 6:00 p.m., ESPNU		Wake Forest	W 92–84	11–3 (3–0)	25 – Wong	8 – McGusty	7 – Moore	Watsco Center (3,376); Coral Gables, FL
Jan 5, 2022; 8:00 p.m., ACCN		Syracuse	W 88–87	12–3 (4–0)	25 – Moore	8 – J. Miller	6 – Moore	Watsco Center (4,506); Coral Gables, FL
Jan 8, 2022; 8:00 p.m., ACCN		at No. 2 Duke	W 76–74	13–3 (5–0)	18 – Moore	6 – Poplar	5 – Waardenburg	Cameron Indoor Stadium (9,314); Durham, NC
Jan 11, 2022; 8:00 p.m., ACCN		at Florida State	L 64–65	13–4 (5–1)	20 – Moore	9 – McGusty	6 – Moore	Donald L. Tucker Civic Center (10,339); Tallahassee, FL
Jan 18, 2022; 7:00 p.m., ACCN		North Carolina	W 85–57	14–4 (6–1)	25 – Wong	10 – McGusty	4 – Tied	Watsco Center (5,979); Coral Gables, FL
Jan 22, 2022; 2:00 p.m., ESPN		Florida State	L 60–61	14–5 (6–2)	22 – Wong	6 – J. Miller	4 – McGusty	Watsco Center (7,972); Coral Gables, FL
Jan 26, 2022; 7:00 p.m., ACCN		at Virginia Tech	W 78–75	15–5 (7–2)	19 – McGusty	7 – McGusty	6 – Moore	Cassell Coliseum (7,086); Blacksburg, VA
Jan 29, 2022; 12:00 p.m., ACCRSN		at Georgia Tech	W 73–62	16–5 (8–2)	20 – McGusty	8 – J. Miller	3 – Tied	McCamish Pavilion (5,135); Atlanta, GA
Feb 2, 2022; 7:00 p.m., ACCRSN		Notre Dame	L 64–68	16–6 (8–3)	18 – Wong	8 – Walker	7 – Moore	Watsco Center (6,363); Coral Gables, FL
Feb 5, 2022; 5:00 p.m., ACCN		at Virginia	L 58–71	16–7 (8–4)	21 – McGusty	5 – Tied	4 – J. Miller	John Paul Jones Arena (14,089); Charlottesville, VA
Feb 9, 2022; 7:00 p.m., ACCRSN		Georgia Tech	W 79–70	17–7 (9–4)	19 – Waardenburg	8 – Tied	5 – Waardenburg	Watsco Center (3,866); Coral Gables, FL
Feb 12, 2022; 3:00 p.m., ACCRSN		at Wake Forest	W 76–72	18–7 (10–4)	22 – McGusty	7 – Wong	3 – Moore	LJVM Coliseum (7,698); Winston-Salem, NC
Feb 16, 2022; 7:00 p.m., ACCRSN		at Louisville	W 70–63	19–7 (11–4)	15 – Tied	9 – Waardenburg	6 – McGusty	KFC Yum! Center (12,065); Louisville, KY
Feb 19, 2022; 5:00 p.m., ACCN		Virginia	L 71–74	19–8 (11–5)	20 – McGusty	7 – Tied	4 – Tied	Watsco Center (5,596); Coral Gables, FL
Feb 22, 2022; 8:00 p.m., ACCN		at Pittsburgh	W 85–64	20–8 (12–5)	19 – Tied	6 – Walker	5 – Moore	Petersen Events Center (7,360); Pittsburgh, PA
Feb 26, 2022; 3:00 p.m., ACCRSN		Virginia Tech	L 70–71	20–9 (12–6)	15 – McGusty	6 – J. Miller	9 – Moore	Watsco Center (5,979); Coral Gables, FL
Mar 2, 2022; 9:00 p.m., ACCN		at Boston College	W 81–70	21–9 (13–6)	27 – Wong	7 – Wong	5 – Moore	Conte Forum (4,045); Chestnut Hill, MA
Mar 5, 2022; 1:00 p.m., ESPNU		at Syracuse	W 75–72	22–9 (14–6)	25 – J. Miller	13 – J. Miller	8 – Moore	Carrier Dome (23,108); Syracuse, NY
ACC tournament
Mar 10, 2022; 2:30 p.m., ESPN2	(4)	vs. (13) Boston College; Quarterfinals	W 71–69 ^{OT}	23–9	16 – McGusty	9 – Waardenburg	6 – Tied	Barclays Center (11,511); Brooklyn, NY
Mar 11, 2022; 7:00 p.m., ESPN	(4)	vs. (1) No. 7 Duke; Semifinals	L 76–80	23–10	24 – McGusty	13 – J. Miller	8 – Moore	Barclays Center (15,994); Brooklyn, NY
NCAA tournament
Mar 18, 2022*; 3:10 pm, truTV	(10 MW)	vs. (7 MW) No. 22 USC; First Round	W 68–66	24–10	22 – Wong	6 – McGusty	4 – Moore	Bon Secours Wellness Arena (14,255); Greenville, SC
Mar 20, 2022*; 7:45 pm, truTV	(10 MW)	vs. (2 MW) No. 8 Auburn; Second Round	W 79–61	25–10	21 – Wong	9 – Moore	8 – Moore	Bon Secours Wellness Arena (14,316); Greenville, SC
Mar 25, 2022*; 9:59 pm, TBS	(10 MW)	vs. (11 MW) Iowa State; Sweet Sixteen	W 70–56	26–10	27 – McGusty	8 – Waardenburg	9 – Moore	United Center (20,857); Chicago, IL
Mar 27, 2022*; 2:20 pm, CBS	(10 MW)	vs. (1 MW) No. 3 Kansas; Elite Eight	L 50–76	26–11	18 – McGusty	5 – Walker	3 – Wong	United Center (20,241); Chicago, IL
*Non-conference game. ^{#}Rankings from AP Poll. (#) Tournament seedings in parentheses. MW=Midwest. All times are in Eastern Time.

== Rankings ==
Ranking movements Legend: ██ Increase in ranking ██ Decrease in ranking — = Not ranked RV = Received votes т = Tied with team above or below
	Week																			
Poll	Pre	1	2	3	4	5	6	7	8	9	10	11	12	13	14	15	16	17	18	Final
AP	—	—	—	—	—	—	—	—	—	—	RV	RV	RV	RV	—	RV	—	—	—	Not released
Coaches	—	—	—	—	—	—	—	—	—	RV	RV	RV	RV	RV	RV	RV	RV	—	—	16т

*AP does not release post-NCAA Tournament rankings.
