= 2021–22 Louisville Cardinals men's basketball team =

American college basketball season

2021–22 Louisville Cardinals men's basketball

Baha Mar Hoops champions
- Conference: Atlantic Coast Conference
- Record: 13–19 (6–14 ACC)
- Head coach: Chris Mack (4th season); Mike Pegues (interim)
- Assistant coaches: Kahil Fennell; Ross McMains
- Home arena: KFC Yum! Center

2021–22 ACC men's basketball standings
	Conf.				Overall
Team	W		L	PCT	W		L	PCT
No. 9 Duke	16	–	4	.800	32	–	7	.821
North Carolina	15	–	5	.750	29	–	10	.744
Notre Dame	15	–	5	.750	24	–	11	.686
Miami (FL)	14	–	6	.700	26	–	11	.703
Wake Forest	13	–	7	.650	25	–	10	.714
Virginia	12	–	8	.600	21	–	14	.600
Virginia Tech †	11	–	9	.550	23	–	13	.639
Florida State	10	–	10	.500	17	–	14	.548
Syracuse	9	–	11	.450	16	–	17	.485
Clemson	8	–	12	.400	17	–	16	.515
Louisville	6	–	14	.300	13	–	19	.406
Boston College	6	–	14	.300	13	–	20	.394
Pittsburgh	6	–	14	.300	11	–	21	.344
Georgia Tech	5	–	15	.250	12	–	20	.375
NC State	4	–	16	.200	11	–	21	.344
† 2022 ACC tournament winner Rankings from AP poll

The 2021–22 Louisville Cardinals men's basketball team represented the University of Louisville during the 2021–22 NCAA Division I men's basketball season. The team played its home games on Denny Crum Court at the KFC Yum! Center in downtown Louisville, Kentucky as members of the Atlantic Coast Conference. They were led by interim head coach Mike Pegues. The Cardinals finished the season 13–19 overall and 6–14 in ACC play to finish in a three-way tie for eleventh place. As the eleventh seed in the ACC tournament, they defeated fourteenth seed Georgia Tech in the First Round before losing to sixth seed Virginia in the Second Round.

Head coach Chris Mack was fired on January 26, 2022, after starting the season 11–9. Associate coach Mike Pegues was named the interim coach for the remainder of the season. On March 16, the school named former Louisville player Kenny Payne the team's new head coach.

== Previous season ==
In a season limited due to the ongoing COVID-19 pandemic, the Cardinals finished the season 13–7, 8–5 to finish in seventh place in ACC play. They lost to Duke in the second round of the ACC tournament. They were listed as an alternate team for the NCAA tournamentshould a team be unable to participate due to COVID-19 issues. The team declined an invitation to the National Invitation Tournament prior to the NCAA Tournament field being announced. When all teams were able to participate in the opening rounds of the NCAA tournament, the Cardinals season ended.

== Offseason ==
=== Suspension of Chris Mack ===
On August 27, 2021, the school announced that head coach Chris Mack would be suspended for the first six games of the season due to his part in an attempt by former assistant Dino Gaudio to blackmail Mack. Gaudio, who was a longtime assistant to Mack and whom Mack had let go following the completion of the 2020–21 season, had attempted to blackmail Mack with allegations of relatively minor misconduct by Mack and the team in violation of NCAA rules. The school said that Mack was being suspended for failing to follow university guidelines regarding the matter. Gaudio pled guilty to extortion for his actions in the matter.

=== Departures ===
Departures
Name	Number	Pos.	Height	Weight	Year	Hometown	Reason for departure
Carlik Jones	1	G	6'1"	185	GS Senior	Cincinnati, OH	Graduated/undrafted in 2021 NBA draft
Hogan Orbaugh	3	C	6'8"	235	Sophomore	Zionsville, IN	Walk-on; didn't return
Quinn Slazinski	11	F	6'8"	215	Sophomore	Houston, TX	Transferred to Iona
David Johnson	13	G	6'5"	210	Sophomore	Louisville, KY	Declared for 2021 NBA draft
Josh Nickelberry	20	G	6'4"	205	Sophomore	Fayetteville, NC	Transferred to La Salle
Charles Minlend	21	G	6'4"	220	GS Senior	Concord, NC	Left the team for personal reasons
Aidan Igiehon	22	F	6'10"	245	Sophomore	Dublin, Ireland	Transferred to Grand Canyon

=== Incoming transfers ===
Incoming transfers
Name	Number	Pos.	Height	Weight	Year	Hometown	Previous school
Noah Locke	0	G	6'3"	205	Senior	Baltimore, MD	Florida
El Ellis	3	G	6'3"	175	Junior	Durham, NC	Tallahassee CC
Mason Faulkner	11	G	6'1"	190	Graduate Student	Glasgow, KY	Western Carolina
Jarrod West	13	G	5'11"	180	Graduate Student	Clarksburg, WV	Marshall
Sydney Curry	23	F	6'8"	260	Junior	Fort Wayne, IN	John A. Logan College
Matt Cross	33	F	6'7"	225	Sophomore	Beverly, MA	Miami (FL)

=== 2021 recruiting class ===
College recruiting information
Name	Hometown	School	Height	Weight	Commit date
Mike James #18 SF	Orlando, FL	Oak Ridge High School	6 ft 6 in (1.98 m)	195 lb (88 kg)	Sep 9, 2020
Mike James #18 SF	Recruit ratings: Scout: Rivals: 247Sports: ESPN: (83)				
Roosevelt Wheeler #13 C	Richmond, VA	John Marshall High School	6 ft 10 in (2.08 m)	265 lb (120 kg)	Nov 16, 2020
Roosevelt Wheeler #13 C	Recruit ratings: Scout: Rivals: 247Sports: ESPN: (83)				
Overall recruit ranking:
Note: In many cases, Scout, Rivals, 247Sports, On3, and ESPN may conflict in their listings of height and weight.; In these cases, the average was taken. ESPN grades are on a 100-point scale.; Sources: "2021 Louisville Commitments". Rivals.; "Men's Basketball Recruiting". Scout.; "ESPN- Louisville Cardinals Men's Basketball Recruiting". ESPN.; "Scout.com Team Recruiting Rankings". Scout.; "2021 Team Ranking". Rivals.

=== 2022 recruiting class ===
College recruiting information (2021)
Name	Hometown	School	Height	Weight	Commit date
D'Ante Davis #36 SF	Indianapolis, IN	Lawrence Central High School	6 ft 5 in (1.96 m)	175 lb (79 kg)	Dec 5, 2020
D'Ante Davis #36 SF	Recruit ratings: Scout: Rivals: 247Sports: ESPN: (82)				
Overall recruit ranking:
Note: In many cases, Scout, Rivals, 247Sports, On3, and ESPN may conflict in their listings of height and weight.; In these cases, the average was taken. ESPN grades are on a 100-point scale.; Sources: "2022 Louisville Commitments". Rivals.; "Men's Basketball Recruiting". Scout.; "ESPN- Louisville Cardinals Men's Basketball Recruiting". ESPN.; "Scout.com Team Recruiting Rankings". Scout.; "2022 Team Ranking". Rivals.

== Roster ==
2021–22 Louisville Cardinals men's basketball team
Players
Coaches

Pos.	#	Name	Height	Weight	Year	Previous school	Hometown
G	0	Noah Locke	6 ft 3 in (1.91 m)	205 lb (93 kg)	Sr	McDonogh School; Florida	Baltimore, MD
G/F	1	Mike James	6 ft 6 in (1.98 m)	195 lb (88 kg)	Fr	Oak Ridge	Orlando, FL
F	2	Sam Bearden (W)	6 ft 5 in (1.96 m)	180 lb (82 kg)	So	Holy Cross	Louisville, KY
G	3	El Ellis	6 ft 3 in (1.91 m)	175 lb (79 kg)	Jr	Quality Education Academy; Tallahassee CC	Durham, NC
F/C	4	Roosevelt Wheeler	6 ft 10 in (2.08 m)	240 lb (109 kg)	Fr	John Marshall	Richmond, VA
F/C	5	Malik Williams	6 ft 11 in (2.11 m)	250 lb (113 kg)	GS	Snider	Fort Wayne, IN
F	10	Samuell Williamson	6 ft 7 in (2.01 m)	210 lb (95 kg)	Jr	Rockwall	Rockwall, TX
G	11	Mason Faulkner	6 ft 1 in (1.85 m)	190 lb (86 kg)	GS	Carvena; Western Carolina	Glasgow, KY
F	12	JJ Traynor	6 ft 8 in (2.03 m)	200 lb (91 kg)	So	Bardstown	Bardstown, KY
G	13	Jarrod West	5 ft 11 in (1.8 m)	180 lb (82 kg)	GS	Notre Dame; Marshall	Clarksburg, WV
G/F	14	Dre Davis	6 ft 5 in (1.96 m)	220 lb (100 kg)	So	Lawrence Central	Indianapolis, IN
F	15	Drew Schultz (W)	6 ft 4 in (1.93 m)	205 lb (93 kg)	So	Rockwall	Rockwall, TX
F	21	Sydney Curry	6 ft 8 in (2.03 m)	260 lb (118 kg)	Jr	Northrop; John A. Logan College	Fort Wayne, IN
C	23	Gabe Wiznitzer	6 ft 11 in (2.11 m)	240 lb (109 kg)	So	Hargrave Military Academy	Walhalla, SC
F	24	Jae'Lyn Withers	6 ft 8 in (2.03 m)	230 lb (104 kg)	RS So	Cleveland Heights	Charlotte, NC
G	30	Ashton Myles-Devore (W)	6 ft 1 in (1.85 m)	170 lb (77 kg)	So	Woodford County	Versailles, KY
F	33	Matt Cross	6 ft 7 in (2.01 m)	225 lb (102 kg)	So	Brewster Academy; Miami (FL)	Beverly, MA
G	45	Brad Colbert (W)	6 ft 2 in (1.88 m)	185 lb (84 kg)	So	International Sports Academy	Loveland, OH

Head coach

- Mike Pegues (Delaware)

Assistant coach(es)

- Kahil Fennell (Redlands)
- Ross McMains (John Cabot)

Legend

- (C) Team captain
- (S) Suspended
- (I) Ineligible
- (W) Walk-on
- Injured
- Current redshirt

Roster

== Schedule and results ==
Date time, TV	Rank^{#}	Opponent^{#}	Result	Record	High points	High rebounds	High assists	Site (attendance) city, state
Exhibition
October 29, 2021*; 7:00 p.m., ACCNX		Kentucky State	W 94–45	–	15 – Locke	15 – Withers	4 – West	KFC Yum! Center (13,023); Louisville, KY
November 3, 2021*; 7:00 p.m., ACCNX		West Georgia	W 103–51	–	15 – Tied	8 – Withers	5 – Tied	KFC Yum! Center (12,477); Louisville, KY
Regular season
November 9, 2021*; 9:00 p.m., ACCRSN		Southern	W 72–60	1–0	16 – Locke	14 – Williamson	5 – West	KFC Yum! Center (12,643); Louisville, KY
November 12, 2021*; 7:00 p.m., ACCNX		Furman	L 72–80 ^{OT}	1–1	20 – Locke	10 – Williams	7 – Faulkner	KFC Yum! Center (12,431); Louisville, KY
November 15, 2021*; 8:00 p.m., ACCN		Navy	W 77–60	2–1	14 – Cross	5 – Williams	5 – Tied	KFC Yum! Center (12,223); Louisville, KY
November 20, 2021*; 2:00 p.m., ACCNX		Detroit Mercy; Baha Mar Hoops Bahamas Championship campus game	W 73–67	3–1	18 – Davis	9 – Tied	3 – Williams	KFC Yum! Center (12,561); Louisville, KY
November 25, 2021*; 9:30 p.m., CBSSN		vs. Mississippi State; Baha Mar Hoops Bahamas Championship semifinals	W 72–58	4–1	15 – Williamson	10 – Williams	3 – West	Baha Mar Convention Center (0); Nassau, Bahamas
November 27, 2021*; 10:00 a.m., CBSSN		vs. Maryland; Baha Mar Hoops Bahamas Championship	W 63–55	5–1	13 – Williams	12 – Williams	6 – West	Baha Mar Convention Center (0); Nassau, Bahamas
December 1, 2021*; 7:15 p.m., ESPN		at No. 22 Michigan State; ACC–Big Ten Challenge	L 64–73	5–2	22 – Ellis	8 – Williams	3 – Tied	Breslin Center (14,797); East Lansing, MI
December 4, 2021; 2:00 p.m., ESPN2		at NC State	W 73–68	6–2 (1–0)	14 – Williams	12 – Williams	6 – West	PNC Arena (13,092); Raleigh, NC
December 10, 2021*; 8:00 p.m., ACCN		DePaul	L 55–62	6–3	22 – Williams	8 – Tied	4 – Davis	KFC Yum! Center (13,127); Louisville, KY
December 14, 2021*; 6:00 p.m., ACCN		Southeastern Louisiana	W 86–60	7–3	15 – Williams	10 – Williams	5 – West	KFC Yum! Center (12,247); Louisville, KY
December 18, 2021*; 3:00 p.m., CBS		at Western Kentucky	L 72–82	7–4	20 – Locke	6 – Withers	4 – West	E. A. Diddle Arena (7,053); Bowling Green, KY
December 22, 2021*; 6:00 p.m., ESPN		at No. 20 Kentucky; Rivalry	Postponed due to COVID-19 issues					Rupp Arena; Lexington, KY
December 29, 2021; 9:00 p.m., ACCN		Wake Forest	W 73–69	8–4 (2–0)	17 – Locke	8 – Tied	5 – Faulkner	KFC Yum! Center (14,120); Louisville, KY
January 2, 2022; 2:00 p.m., ACCN		at Georgia Tech	W 67–64	9–4 (3–0)	20 – Williams	10 – Williams	4 – Tied	McCamish Pavilion (4,853); Atlanta, GA
January 5, 2022; 7:00 p.m., ESPNU		Pittsburgh	W 75–72	10–4 (4–0)	18 – Ellis	8 – Curry	4 – Tied	KFC Yum! Center (11,973); Louisville, KY
January 8, 2022; 8:00 p.m., ESPN2		Florida State	L 70–79	10–5 (4–1)	14 – Ellis	7 – Tied	3 – Tied	Donald L. Tucker Center (9,527); Tallahassee, FL
January 12, 2022; 9:00 p.m., ACCN		NC State	L 63–79	10–6 (4–2)	22 – Curry	10 – Curry	3 – Locke	KFC Yum! Center (11,973); Louisville, KY
January 15, 2022; 4:00 p.m., ACCN		at Pittsburgh	L 53–65	10–7 (4–3)	12 – Williams	13 – Williams	2 – 3 tied	Petersen Events Center (8,431); Pittsburgh, PA
January 19, 2022; 7:00 p.m., ACCRSN		Boston College	W 67–54	11–7 (5–3)	13 – Curry	8 – Williams	7 – Faulkner	KFC Yum! Center (12,123); Louisville, KY
January 22, 2022; 4:00 p.m., ESPN		Notre Dame	L 70–82	11–8 (5–4)	14 – West	9 – Withers	5 – Faulkner	KFC Yum! Center (16,175); Louisville, KY
January 24, 2022; 7:00 p.m., ESPN		at Virginia	L 52–64	11–9 (5–5)	14 – West	6 – Cross	3 – West	John Paul Jones Arena (13,076); Charlottesville, VA
January 29, 2022; 12:00 p.m., ESPN		No. 9 Duke	L 65–74	11–10 (5–6)	16 – Davis	12 – Williams	4 – Faulkner	KFC Yum! Center (18,493); Louisville, KY
February 1, 2022; 6:00 p.m., ACCN		North Carolina	L 83–90 ^{OT}	11–11 (5–7)	25 – Ellis	15 – Cross	4 – Faulkner	KFC Yum! Center (13,386); Louisville, KY
February 5, 2022; 2:00 p.m., ESPN2		at Syracuse	L 69–92	11–12 (5–8)	13 – Withers	10 – Curry	5 – West	Carrier Dome (23,298); Syracuse, NY
February 9, 2022; 7:00 p.m., ESPNU		at Notre Dame	L 57–63	11–13 (5–9)	20 – Withers	6 – Wheeler	3 – West	Edmund P. Joyce Center (8,260); South Bend, IN
February 16, 2022; 7:00 p.m., ACCRSN		Miami (FL)	L 63–70	11–14 (5–10)	18 – Davis	7 – Tied	1 – 6 tied	KFC Yum! Center (12,065); Louisville, KY
February 19, 2022; 3:00 p.m., ACCRSN		Clemson	W 70–61	12–14 (6–10)	15 – Locke	10 – Withers	3 – Ellis	KFC Yum! Center (13,242); Louisville, KY
February 21, 2022; 7:00 p.m., ESPN		at North Carolina	L 63–70	12–15 (6–11)	10 – 3 tied	7 – Withers	5 – West	Dean Smith Center (18,618); Chapel Hill, NC
February 26, 2022; 7:00 p.m., ACCN		at Wake Forest	L 77–99	12–16 (6–12)	28 – Curry	7 – Curry	3 – Faulkner	LJVM Coliseum (8,139); Winston-Salem, NC
March 1, 2022; 9:00 p.m., ESPN2		at Virginia Tech	L 43–75	12–17 (6–13)	18 – Curry	11 – Curry	4 – West	Cassell Coliseum (8,925); Blacksburg, VA
March 5, 2022; 12:00 p.m., ESPN2		Virginia	L 61–71	12–18 (6–14)	24 – Curry	14 – Curry	7 – Faulkner	KFC Yum! Center (13,085); Louisville, KY
ACC tournament
March 8, 2022; 7:00 p.m., ACCN	(11)	vs. (14) Georgia Tech; First round	W 84–74	13–18	20 – West	10 – Williams	6 – Ellis	Barclays Center (6,222); Brooklyn, NY
March 9, 2022; 9:30 p.m., ESPN2	(11)	vs. (6) Virginia; Second round	L 50–51	13–19	11 – Williams	13 – Williams	3 – West	Barclays Center (8,174); Brooklyn, NY
*Non-conference game. ^{#}Rankings from AP Poll. (#) Tournament seedings in parentheses. All times are in Eastern Time.

Schedule Source:

== Rankings ==
Ranking movements Legend: ██ Increase in ranking ██ Decrease in ranking — = Not ranked RV = Received votes
	Week																			
Poll	Pre	1	2	3	4	5	6	7	8	9	10	11	12	13	14	15	16	17	18	Final
AP	RV	—	—	—	RV	—	—	—	—	—	—	—	—	—	—	—	—	—	—	Not released
Coaches	—	—	—	—	—	—	—	—	—	—	—	—	—	—	—	—	—	—	—	—

*AP does not release post-NCAA tournament rankings
^Coaches did not release a Week 2 poll.
