= Noah Locke =

American basketball player (born 1999)

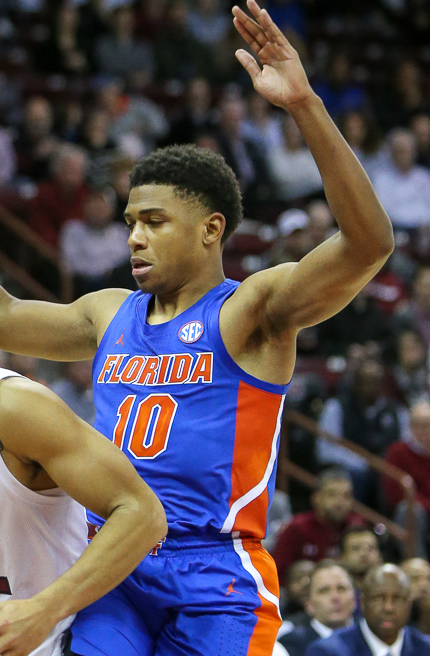
- Locke with Florida in 2020

No. 5 – Cholet Basket
- Position: Shooting guard
- League: LNB Élite; Champions League

Personal information
- Born: May 10, 1999 (age 27) Randallstown, Maryland, U.S.
- Listed height: 6 ft 3 in (1.91 m)
- Listed weight: 210 lb (95 kg)

Career information
- High school: McDonogh School (Owings Mills, Maryland)
- College: Florida (2018–2021); Louisville (2021–2022); Providence (2022–2023)
- NBA draft: 2023: undrafted
- Playing career: 2023–present

Career history
- 2023–2024: Szedeák
- 2024–2025: Bamberg Baskets
- 2025–2026: Ironi Kiryat Ata
- 2026–present: Cholet Basket

Noah Jamei Locke (born May 10, 1999) is an American professional basketball player for Cholet Basket of the LNB Élite. He played college basketball for the Florida Gators, the Louisville Cardinals, and the Providence Friars.

== Early life and high school career ==
Locke began playing basketball at the age of seven. He attended the McDonogh School, where he was coached by T. J. Jordan. As a senior, Locke averaged 21.6 points, seven rebounds and five assists per game. Locke garnered USA Today First Team All-USA Maryland Boys Basketball honors. He finished his career as the all-time leading scorer at the McDonogh School with 2,350 points. Locke committed to playing college basketball for Florida over offers from Michigan, Ohio State, Providence and Xavier.

== College career ==
On January 11, 2019, Locke scored a career-high 27 points against Texas A&M. He averaged 9.4 points per game as a freshman. As a sophomore, Locke averaged 10.6 points and 2.5 rebounds per game, and his 48.1 percent three-point shooting in Southeastern Conference play led the league. He was hampered by a nagging hip injury, and underwent surgery in the offseason. In the 2021 NCAA Tournament, he scored 17 points in a loss to Oral Roberts. As a junior, Locke averaged 10.6 points and 2.4 rebounds per game, and he led the team with made three-pointers with 57. After the season, he transferred to Louisville. Locke averaged 9.6 points, 2.3 rebounds, and one assist per game for the Cardinals. He opted to use his additional season of eligibility and transfer to Providence. Locked averaged 11 points and 2.3 rebounds per game in his final season.

== Professional career ==
In September 2023, Locke signed with Szedeák of the Nemzeti Bajnokság I/A. He was the top scorer in the Hungarian league with 23.6 points per game. On June 25, 2024, Locke signed with Bamberg Baskets of the Basketball Bundesliga. In 2025, he signed with Ironi Kiryat Ata B.C. of the Israeli Basketball Premier League. In March 2026, Locke joined Cholet Basket as a medical replacement player (pigiste médical) following the injury of DeAndre Gholston. He averaged 13.5 points per game over his first four appearances in LNB Élite while shooting 58.1 percent from the field and 68.2 percent from three-point range.

On June 18, 2026, he signed with Cholet Basket of LNB Pro A.

== Career statistics ==
Legend
GP	Games played	GS	Games started	MPG	Minutes per game
FG%	Field goal percentage	3P%	3-point field goal percentage	FT%	Free throw percentage
RPG	Rebounds per game	APG	Assists per game	SPG	Steals per game
BPG	Blocks per game	PPG	Points per game	**Bold**	Career high

=== College ===
Year	Team	GP	GS	MPG	FG%	3P%	FT%	RPG	APG	SPG	BPG	PPG
2018–19	Florida	**36**	26	25.4	.375	.379	.775	2.3	.6	.4	.0	9.4
2019–20	Florida	31	29	**29.8**	**.429**	**.432**	.714	**2.5**	.7	**.6**	.0	10.6
2020–21	Florida	25	24	29.0	.425	.404	.778	2.4	.7	**.6**	**.2**	10.6
2021–22	Louisville	32	25	26.1	.358	.342	.714	2.3	**1.0**	.4	.1	9.6
2022–23	Providence	33	**32**	27.8	**.429**	.385	**.794**	2.3	.9	.4	.0	**11.0**
Career		157	136	27.5	.401	.386	.758	2.4	.8	.5	.1	10.2

== Personal life ==
Locke is the son of Vanessa and Kyle Locke, both of whom played college basketball at Coppin State. His brother Kayel played basketball at UNC Greensboro before embarking on a professional career. His sister Paris plays for the McDonogh School team.
