= 2021–22 Notre Dame Fighting Irish men's basketball team =

NCAA basketball team

2021–22 Notre Dame Fighting Irish men's basketball

NCAA tournament, Second Round
- Conference: Atlantic Coast Conference
- Record: 24–11 (15–5 ACC)
- Head coach: Mike Brey (22nd season)
- Associate head coach: Anthony Solomon
- Assistant coaches: Ryan Humphrey; Antoni Wyche
- Home arena: Edmund P. Joyce Center

2021–22 ACC men's basketball standings
	Conf.				Overall
Team	W		L	PCT	W		L	PCT
No. 9 Duke	16	–	4	.800	32	–	7	.821
North Carolina	15	–	5	.750	29	–	10	.744
Notre Dame	15	–	5	.750	24	–	11	.686
Miami (FL)	14	–	6	.700	26	–	11	.703
Wake Forest	13	–	7	.650	25	–	10	.714
Virginia	12	–	8	.600	21	–	14	.600
Virginia Tech †	11	–	9	.550	23	–	13	.639
Florida State	10	–	10	.500	17	–	14	.548
Syracuse	9	–	11	.450	16	–	17	.485
Clemson	8	–	12	.400	17	–	16	.515
Louisville	6	–	14	.300	13	–	19	.406
Boston College	6	–	14	.300	13	–	20	.394
Pittsburgh	6	–	14	.300	11	–	21	.344
Georgia Tech	5	–	15	.250	12	–	20	.375
NC State	4	–	16	.200	11	–	21	.344
† 2022 ACC tournament winner Rankings from AP poll

The 2021–22 Notre Dame Fighting Irish men's basketball team represented the University of Notre Dame during the 2021–22 NCAA Division I men's basketball season. The Fighting Irish were led by 22nd-year head coach Mike Brey and played their home games at the Edmund P. Joyce Center in South Bend, Indiana as ninth-year members of the Atlantic Coast Conference. They finished the season 24–11, 15–5 in ACC Play to finish a tie for second place. As the No. 2 seed, they lost in the quarterfinals of the ACC tournament to Virginia Tech. They received an at-large bid to the NCAA tournament as the No. 11 seed in the West Region, where they defeated Rutgers in the First Four and then upset Alabama to advance to the Second Round where they lost to Texas Tech.

== Previous season ==
In a season limited due to the ongoing COVID-19 pandemic, the Fighting Irish finished the 2020–21 season 11–15, 7–11 in ACC play to finish in 11th place. In the ACC tournament they defeated Wake Forest before losing to North Carolina in the second round.

== Offseason ==
=== Departures ===
Departures
Name	Number	Pos.	Height	Weight	Year	Hometown	Reason for departure
Juwan Durham	11	F	6'11"	223	GS	Tampa, FL	Graduated
Nikola Djogo	13	G	6'8"	230	GS	Hamilton, ON	Graduate transferred to Northeastern

=== Incoming transfers ===
Incoming transfers
Name	Number	Pos.	Height	Weight	Year	Hometown	Previous school
Paul Atkinson	20	F	6'9"	230	GS	West Palm Beach, FL	Yale

=== 2021 recruiting class ===
College recruiting
Name	Hometown	School	Height	Weight	Commit date
J.R. Konieczny; SF	South Bend, IN	St. Joseph	6 ft 6 in (1.98 m)	195 lb (88 kg)	Aug 18, 2019
J.R. Konieczny; SF	Recruit ratings: Rivals: 247Sports: On3: ESPN: (81)				
Blake Wesley #22 SG	South Bend, IN	Riley	6 ft 5 in (1.96 m)	185 lb (84 kg)	Nov 20, 2020
Blake Wesley #22 SG	Recruit ratings: Rivals: 247Sports: On3: ESPN: (82)				
Overall recruit ranking: Rivals: 45 247Sports: 55
Note: In many cases, Scout, Rivals, 247Sports, On3, and ESPN may conflict in their listings of height and weight.; In these cases, the average was taken. ESPN grades are on a 100-point scale.; Sources: "Notre Dame Fighting Irish". ESPN.; "2021 Team Ranking". Rivals.; "Notre Dame 2021 Basketball Commits". 247Sports.

== Roster ==
2021–22 Notre Dame Fighting Irish men's basketball team
Players
Coaches

Pos.	#	Name	Height	Weight	Year	Previous school	Hometown
G	0	Blake Wesley	6 ft 5 in (1.96 m)	185 lb (84 kg)	Fr	Riley	South Bend, IN
G	1	J.R. Konieczny	6 ft 6 in (1.98 m)	195 lb (88 kg)	Fr	St. Joseph	South Bend, IN
G	2	Trey Wertz	6 ft 5 in (1.96 m)	193 lb (88 kg)	Sr	Providence Day	Charlotte, NC
G	3	Prentiss Hubb	6 ft 3 in (1.91 m)	176 lb (80 kg)	Sr	Gonzaga	Upper Marlboro, MD
G	4	Alex Wade (W)	6 ft 0 in (1.83 m)	166 lb (75 kg)	Fr	Cathedral Catholic	San Diego, CA
G	5	Cormac Ryan	6 ft 5 in (1.96 m)	195 lb (88 kg)	Sr	Milton Academy; Stanford	New York City, NY
G	12	Tony Sanders Jr.	6 ft 7 in (2.01 m)	215 lb (98 kg)	So	Gulliver Prep	Miami, FL
F	14	Nate Laszewski	6 ft 10 in (2.08 m)	230 lb (104 kg)	Sr	Northfield Mount Hermon	Jupiter, FL
F	20	Paul Atkinson	6 ft 9 in (2.06 m)	230 lb (104 kg)	GS	Westminster Academy; Yale	West Palm Beach, FL
F	22	Elijah Taylor	6 ft 8 in (2.03 m)	242 lb (110 kg)	So	Imhotep	Philadelphia, PA
G	23	Dane Goodwin	6 ft 6 in (1.98 m)	214 lb (97 kg)	Sr	Upper Arlington	Upper Arlington, OH
G	24	Robby Carmody	6 ft 4 in (1.93 m)	205 lb (93 kg)	Sr	Mars Area	Mars, PA
F	25	Matt Zona	6 ft 9 in (2.06 m)	242 lb (110 kg)	So	Bergen Catholic	Blauvelt, NY
G	31	Elijah Morgan (W)	6 ft 1 in (1.85 m)	169 lb (77 kg)	Jr	Jesuit High School	New Orleans, LA

Head coach

- Mike Brey (George Washington)

Assistant coach(es)

- Anthony Solomon (Virginia)
- Ryan Humphrey (Notre Dame)
- Antoni Wyche (Notre Dame)

Legend

- (C) Team captain
- (S) Suspended
- (I) Ineligible
- (W) Walk-on
- Injured
- Current redshirt

Roster

== Schedule and results ==
Date time, TV	Rank^{#}	Opponent^{#}	Result	Record	High points	High rebounds	High assists	Site (attendance) city, state
Exhibition
October 29, 2021*; 7:00 p.m.		Nazareth College	W 87–37	–	16 – Ryan	10 – Atkinson	7 – Hubb	Edmund P. Joyce Center (5,039); South Bend, IN
November 5, 2021*; 7:00 p.m.		St. Norbert	W 78–44	–	15 – Tied	15 – Laszewski	4 – Tied	Edmund P. Joyce Center (5,231); South Bend, IN
Regular season
November 13, 2021*; 12:00 p.m., ACCNX		Cal State Northridge	W 68–52	1–0	21 – Wesley	8 – Laszewski	6 – Hubb	Edmund P. Joyce Center (5,062); South Bend, IN
November 16, 2021*; 8:00 p.m., ACCN		High Point	W 70–61	2–0	19 – Atkinson	16 – Laszewski	5 – Hubb	Edmund P. Joyce Center (5,124); South Bend, IN
November 22, 2021*; 10:30 p.m., ESPN2		vs. Saint Mary's; Maui Invitational tournament quarterfinals	L 59–62	2–1	16 – Ryan	7 – Laszewski	5 – Wertz	Michelob Ultra Arena (0); Paradise, NV
November 23, 2021*; 10:30 p.m., ESPNU		vs. Chaminade; Maui Invitational Tournament	W 90–64	3–1	17 – Goodwin	15 – Laszewski	3 – Tied	Michelob Ultra Arena (0); Paradise, NV
November 24, 2021*; 11:30 p.m., ESPN2		vs. Texas A&M; Maui Invitational Tournament	L 67–73	3–2	18 – Goodwin	8 – Goodwin	6 – Wertz	Michelob Ultra Arena (0); Paradise, NV
November 29, 2021*; 9:00 p.m., ESPN2		at Illinois; ACC–Big Ten Challenge	L 72–82	3–3	24 – Wesley	7 – Ryan	2 – Tied	State Farm Center (14,907); Champaign, IL
December 3, 2021; 6:00 p.m., ACCN		at Boston College	L 57–73	3–4 (0–1)	15 – Hubb	8 – Laszewski	3 – Wesley	Conte Forum (6,023); Chestnut Hill, MA
December 11, 2021*; 5:15 p.m., ESPN		No. 10 Kentucky	W 66–62	4–4	14 – Tied	6 – Tied	4 – Ryan	Edmund P. Joyce Center (8,283); South Bend, IN
December 18, 2021*; 2:30 p.m., FOX		vs. Indiana; Crossroads Classic	L 56–64	4–5	15 – Goodwin	11 – Atkinson	2 – Tied	Gainbridge Fieldhouse (17,905); Indianapolis, IN
December 20, 2021*; 8:00 p.m., ACCN		Western Michigan	W 85–52	5–5	18 – Goodwin	8 – Wesley	5 – Wertz	Edmund P. Joyce Center (4,903); South Bend, IN
December 22, 2021*; 1:00 p.m., ACCNX		Texas A&M–Corpus Christi	W 83–73	6–5	21 – Goodwin	7 – Ryan	9 – Wesley	Edmund P. Joyce Center (5,970); South Bend, IN
December 28, 2021; 8:00 p.m., ACCN		at Pittsburgh	W 68–67	7–5 (1–1)	16 – Atkinson	8 – Atkinson	4 – Goodwin	Petersen Events Center (8,656); Pittsburgh, PA
January 5, 2022; 9:00 p.m., ESPN2		North Carolina	W 78–73	8–5 (2–1)	20 – Laszewski	8 – Laszewski	6 – Hubb	Edmund P. Joyce Center (6,259); South Bend, IN
January 8, 2022; 6:00 p.m., ACCN		at Georgia Tech	W 72–68 ^{OT}	9–5 (3–1)	22 – Wesley	9 – Laszewski	9 – Hubb	McCamish Pavilion (5,813); Atlanta, GA
January 12, 2022; 7:00 p.m., ACCRSN		Clemson	W 72–56	10–5 (4–1)	21 – Goodwin	8 – Laszewski	3 – Tied	Edmund P. Joyce Center (7,618); South Bend, IN
January 15, 2022; 6:00 p.m., ACCN		at Virginia Tech	L 73–79	10–6 (4–2)	19 – Atkinson	9 – Atkinson	4 – Wesley	Cassell Coliseum (8,925); Blacksburg, VA
January 17, 2021*; 2:30 p.m., FOX		at Howard; MLK Day Classic	W 71–68	11–6	17 – Tied	13 – Laszewski	2 – Tied	Burr Gymnasium (1,315); Washington, D.C.
January 22, 2022; 4:00 p.m., ESPN		at Louisville	W 82–70	12–6 (5–2)	22 – Wesley	6 – Laszewski	5 – Hubb	KFC Yum! Center (16,175); Louisville, KY
January 26, 2022; 9:00 p.m., ACCRSN		NC State	W 73–65	13–6 (6–2)	18 – Laszewski	11 – Laszewski	5 – Hubb	Edmund P. Joyce Center (8,120); South Bend, IN
January 29, 2022; 6:00 p.m., ACCN		Virginia	W 69–65	14–6 (7–2)	16 – Tied	9 – Atkinson	7 – Wesley	Edmund P. Joyce Center (8,495); South Bend, IN
January 31, 2022; 7:00 p.m., ESPN		No. 9 Duke; Rescheduled from January 1	L 43–57	14–7 (7–3)	14 – Atkinson	9 – Atkinson	3 – Ryan	Edmund P. Joyce Center (9,149); South Bend, IN
February 2, 2022; 7:00 p.m., ACCRSN		at Miami (FL)	W 68–64	15–7 (8–3)	23 – Atkinson	11 – Atkinson	7 – Wesley	Watsco Center (6,363); Coral Gables, FL
February 5, 2022; 3:00 p.m., ACCN		at NC State	W 69–57	16–7 (9–3)	15 – Atkinson	10 – Tied	4 – Hubb	PNC Arena (13,690); Raleigh, NC
February 9, 2022; 7:00 p.m., ESPNU		Louisville	W 63–57	17–7 (10–3)	17 – Atkinson	15 – Atkinson	5 – Hubb	Edmund P. Joyce Center (8,260); South Bend, IN
February 12, 2022; 7:00 p.m., ACCN		at Clemson	W 76–61	18–7 (11–3)	21 – Wesley	6 – Wesley	4 – Atkinson Jr.	Littlejohn Coliseum (7,524); Clemson, SC
February 16, 2022; 7:00 p.m., ESPNU		Boston College	W 99–95 ^{OT}	19–7 (12–3)	23 – Goodwin	7 – Hubb	4 – Wesley	Edmund P. Joyce Center (7,700); South Bend, IN
February 19, 2022; 1:00 p.m., ACCRSN		at Wake Forest	L 74–79	19–8 (12–4)	24 – Wesley	7 – Goodwin	6 – Hubb	LJVM Coliseum (8,355); Winston-Salem, NC
February 23, 2022; 7:00 p.m., ESPNews		Syracuse	W 79–69	20–8 (13–4)	20 – Atkinson	17 – Atkinson	10 – Hubb	Edmund P. Joyce Center (7,838); South Bend, IN
February 26, 2022; 5:00 p.m., ACCN		Georgia Tech	W 90–56	21–8 (14–4)	17 – Goodwin	10 – Ryan	6 – Hubb	Edmund P. Joyce Center (9,149); South Bend, IN
March 2, 2022; 7:00 p.m., ESPN2		at Florida State	L 70–74	21–9 (14–5)	21 – Wesley	10 – Atkinson	3 – Tied	Donald L. Tucker Civic Center (8,401); Tallahassee, FL
March 5, 2022; 2:30 p.m., ESPNews		Pittsburgh	W 78–54	22–9 (15–5)	17 – Laszewski	9 – Laszewski	6 – Hubb	Edmund P. Joyce Center (8,555); South Bend, IN
ACC tournament
March 10, 2022; 7:00 p.m., ESPN2	(2)	vs. (7) Virginia Tech; Quarterfinals	L 80–87	22–10	23 – Hubb	10 – Laszewski	5 – Hubb	Barclays Center; Brooklyn, NY
NCAA tournament
March 16, 2022*; 9:10 pm, TruTV	(11 W)	vs. (11 W) Rutgers; First Four	W 89–87 ^{2OT}	23–10	26 – Atkinson	6 – Tied	7 – Hubb	UD Arena (12,516); Dayton, OH
March 18, 2022*; 4:15 pm, TNT	(11 W)	vs. (6 W) Alabama; First Round	W 78–64	24–10	29 – Ryan	8 – Atkinson Jr.	3 – Tied	Viejas Arena (11,328); San Diego, CA
March 20, 2022*; 7:10 pm, TBS	(11 W)	vs. (3 W) No. 12 Texas Tech; Second Round	L 53–59	24–11	14 – Goodwin	8 – Tied	3 – Tied	Viejas Arena; San Diego, CA
*Non-conference game. ^{#}Rankings from AP Poll. (#) Tournament seedings in parentheses. W=West. All times are in Eastern Time.

== Rankings ==
Ranking movements Legend: ██ Increase in ranking ██ Decrease in ranking — = Not ranked RV = Received votes
	Week																			
Poll	Pre	1	2	3	4	5	6	7	8	9	10	11	12	13	14	15	16	17	18	Final
AP	RV	—	—	—	—	—	—	—	—	—	—	—	—	RV	RV	RV	RV	RV	—	Not released
Coaches	RV	RV	—	—	—	—	—	—	—	—	—	—	RV	RV	RV	RV	RV	RV	—	RV

*AP does not release post-NCAA Tournament rankings
