= 2021–22 Florida State Seminoles men's basketball team =

American college basketball season

2021–22 Florida State Seminoles men's basketball

Jacksonville Classic Duval champions
- Conference: Atlantic Coast Conference
- Record: 17–14 (10–10 ACC)
- Head coach: Leonard Hamilton (20th season)
- Associate head coach: Stan Jones
- Assistant coaches: Charlton Young; Steve Smith
- Home arena: Donald L. Tucker Center

2021–22 ACC men's basketball standings
| | Conf. | | | | Overall |
| Team | W | | L | PCT | W | | L | PCT |
|---|---|---|---|---|---|---|---|---|
| No. 9 Duke | 16 | – | 4 | .800 | 32 | – | 7 | .821 |
| North Carolina | 15 | – | 5 | .750 | 29 | – | 10 | .744 |
| Notre Dame | 15 | – | 5 | .750 | 24 | – | 11 | .686 |
| Miami (FL) | 14 | – | 6 | .700 | 26 | – | 11 | .703 |
| Wake Forest | 13 | – | 7 | .650 | 25 | – | 10 | .714 |
| Virginia | 12 | – | 8 | .600 | 21 | – | 14 | .600 |
| Virginia Tech † | 11 | – | 9 | .550 | 23 | – | 13 | .639 |
| Florida State | 10 | – | 10 | .500 | 17 | – | 14 | .548 |
| Syracuse | 9 | – | 11 | .450 | 16 | – | 17 | .485 |
| Clemson | 8 | – | 12 | .400 | 17 | – | 16 | .515 |
| Louisville | 6 | – | 14 | .300 | 13 | – | 19 | .406 |
| Boston College | 6 | – | 14 | .300 | 13 | – | 20 | .394 |
| Pittsburgh | 6 | – | 14 | .300 | 11 | – | 21 | .344 |
| Georgia Tech | 5 | – | 15 | .250 | 12 | – | 20 | .375 |
| NC State | 4 | – | 16 | .200 | 11 | – | 21 | .344 |
† 2022 ACC tournament winner Rankings from AP poll

The 2021–22 Florida State Seminoles men's basketball team represented Florida State University during the 2021–22 NCAA Division I men's basketball season. The Seminoles were led by head coach Leonard Hamilton, in his 20th year, and played their home games at the Donald L. Tucker Center on the university's Tallahassee, Florida campus as members of the Atlantic Coast Conference.

The Seminoles finished the season 17–14 overall and 10–10 in ACC play to finish in eight place. As the eighth seed in the ACC tournament, they lost to Syracuse in their Second Round matchup. They missed the postseason for the first time since 2015.

== Offseason ==
=== Departures ===
Florida State Departures
| Name | Number | Pos. | Height | Weight | Year | Hometown | Reason for Departure |
|---|---|---|---|---|---|---|---|
| RaiQuan Gray | 1 | F | 6'8" | 260 | (redshirt) Junior | Fort Lauderdale, FL | Declared for the 2021 NBA draft; selected 59th overall by the Brooklyn Nets |
| Scottie Barnes | 4 | G | 6'9" | 227 | Freshman | West Palm Beach, FL | Declared for the 2021 NBA draft; selected 4th overall by the Toronto Raptors |
| Balša Koprivica | 5 | C | 7'1" | 240 | Sophomore | Belgrade, Serbia | Declared for the 2021 NBA draft; selected 57th overall by the Charlotte Hornets |
| Nathanael Jack | 11 | G | 6'5" | 195 | Senior | Mississauga, ON | Graduated / Transfer Portal |
| Travis Light | 20 | G | 6'5" | 180 | (redshirt) Senior | Vienna, VA | Graduated |
| M. J. Walker | 23 | G | 6'5" | 213 | Senior | Riverdale, GA | Graduated |
| Sardaar Calhoun | 24 | G | 6'6" | 220 | Junior | Tappahannock, VA | Transferred to Texas Tech |
| Will Miles | 33 | G | 6'6" | 220 | (redshirt) Senior | Orlando, FL | Graduated |

=== Incoming transfers ===
Florida State incoming transfers
| Name | Number | Pos. | Height | Weight | Year | Hometown | Previous School | Years Remaining | Date Eligible |
|---|---|---|---|---|---|---|---|---|---|
| Caleb Mills | 4 | G | 6'5" | 180 | (redshirt) Junior | Arden, NC | Houston | 3 | October 1, 2021 |
| Cam'Ron Fletcher | 21 | G | 6'7" | 215 | Sophomore | St. Louis, MO | Kentucky | 4 | October 1, 2021 |

=== 2021 recruiting class ===
College recruiting
| Name | Hometown | School | Height | Weight | Commit date |
|---|---|---|---|---|---|
| Matthew Cleveland; SG / SF | Atlanta, GA | Pace Academy (GA) | 6 ft 6 in (1.98 m) | 193 lb (88 kg) | Jul 21, 2020 |
| Matthew Cleveland; SG / SF | Recruit ratings: Rivals: 247Sports: ESPN: (89) | | | | |
| John Butler Jr. C | Greenville, SC | Christ Church Episcopal (SC) | 7 ft 0 in (2.13 m) | 187 lb (85 kg) | Jul 29, 2020 |
| John Butler Jr. C | Recruit ratings: Rivals: 247Sports: ESPN: (84) | | | | |
| Naheem McLeod; C | Philadelphia, PA | Chipola College (FL) | 7 ft 3 in (2.21 m) | 230 lb (100 kg) | Jul 30, 2020 |
| Naheem McLeod; C | Recruit ratings: Rivals: 247Sports: ESPN: (nr) | | | | |
| Jalen Warley; CG | Norristown, PA | Westtown School (PA) | 6 ft 5 in (1.96 m) | 180 lb (82 kg) | Aug 9, 2020 |
| Jalen Warley; CG | Recruit ratings: Rivals: 247Sports: ESPN: (84) | | | | |
Overall recruit ranking: Rivals: 6 247Sports: 5
Note: In many cases, Scout, Rivals, 247Sports, On3, and ESPN may conflict in their listings of height and weight.; In these cases, the average was taken. ESPN grades are on a 100-point scale.; Sources: "Florida State Seminoles". ESPN.; "2021 Team Ranking". Rivals.

== Roster ==
2021–22 Florida State Seminoles men's basketball team
Players
Coaches

| Pos. | # | Name | Height | Weight | Year | Previous school | Hometown |
|---|---|---|---|---|---|---|---|
| G | 0 | RayQuan Evans | 6 ft 4 in (1.93 m) | 200 lb (91 kg) | GS | Billings Skyview; North Idaho College | Billings, MT |
| G | 1 | Jalen Warley | 6 ft 6 in (1.98 m) | 200 lb (91 kg) | Fr | Westtown School | Mount Airy, PA |
| G | 2 | Anthony Polite | 6 ft 6 in (1.98 m) | 214 lb (97 kg) | GS | St. Andrew's Christian | Lugano, Switzerland |
| G | 4 | Caleb Mills | 6 ft 5 in (1.96 m) | 180 lb (82 kg) | RS Jr | T. C. Roberson; Houston | Arden, NC |
| F | 5 | Michael Brown (W) | 6 ft 7 in (2.01 m) | 220 lb (100 kg) | Fr | Sidwell Friends | Fort Washington, MD |
| F | 10 | Malik Osborne | 6 ft 9 in (2.06 m) | 225 lb (102 kg) | GS | Don Bosco Prep; Rice | Matteson, IL |
| C | 11 | Tanor Ngom | 7 ft 2 in (2.18 m) | 236 lb (107 kg) | GS | Iqra Bilingual Academy; Ryerson | Dakar, Senegal |
| G | 12 | Justin Lindner (W) | 6 ft 1 in (1.85 m) | 180 lb (82 kg) | GS | Christian Brothers | Memphis, TN |
| C | 15 | Quincy Ballard | 7 ft 0 in (2.13 m) | 240 lb (109 kg) | So | Quality Education Academcy | Syracuse, NY |
| G | 21 | Cam'Ron Fletcher | 6 ft 7 in (2.01 m) | 215 lb (98 kg) | So | Vashon; Kentucky | St. Louis, MO |
| F | 22 | John Butler Jr. | 7 ft 1 in (2.16 m) | 190 lb (86 kg) | Fr | Christ Church Episcopal | Greenville, SC |
| C | 24 | Naheem McLeod | 7 ft 4 in (2.24 m) | 255 lb (116 kg) | So | Plymouth-Whitemarsh; Chipola College | Philadelphia, PA |
| F | 25 | John Horner (W) | 6 ft 7 in (2.01 m) | 205 lb (93 kg) | Fr | St. Augustine Prep | Ventnor City, NJ |
| F | 30 | Harrison Prieto (W) | 6 ft 8 in (2.03 m) | 230 lb (104 kg) | GS | St. Paul's School | Mandeville, LA |
| G | 31 | Wyatt Wilkes | 6 ft 8 in (2.03 m) | 220 lb (100 kg) | RS Sr | Winter Park | Orlando, FL |
| G/F | 34 | Barrett Waldrop (W) | 6 ft 7 in (2.01 m) | 205 lb (93 kg) | Fr | South Walton | Freeport, FL |
| G | 35 | Matthew Cleveland | 6 ft 7 in (2.01 m) | 200 lb (91 kg) | Fr | Pace Academy | Atlanta, GA |
| G | 40 | Isaac Spainhour (W) | 6 ft 3 in (1.91 m) | 180 lb (82 kg) | RS Fr | West Stokes | King, NC |
| G | 42 | Cleveland Yates (W) | 6 ft 2 in (1.88 m) | 214 lb (97 kg) | RS So | Briarcrest Christian School | Memphis, TN |
| G | 44 | Max Thorpe (W) | 6 ft 3 in (1.91 m) | 175 lb (79 kg) | RS Fr | Countryside | Clearwater, FL |

Head coach

- Leonard Hamilton (UT Martin)

Assistant coach(es)

- Stan Jones (Memphis)
- Charlton Young (Georgia Southern)
- Steve Smith (Morgan State)

Legend

- (C) Team captain
- (S) Suspended
- (I) Ineligible
- (W) Walk-on
- Injured
- Current redshirt

Roster

== Schedule and results ==
| Date time, TV | Rank^{#} | Opponent^{#} | Result | Record | High points | High rebounds | High assists | Site (attendance) city, state Source: |
Exhibition
| October 28, 2021*; 7:00 p.m., ACCNX | No. 20 | Mississippi College | W 94–51 | – | 17 – Evans | 13 – Osborne | 5 – Tied | Donald L. Tucker Center (–); Tallahassee, FL |
| November 5, 2021*; 6:00 p.m., ACCNX | No. 20 | Florida College | W 102–55 | – | 14 – Evans | 8 – Polite | 7 – Warley | Donald L. Tucker Center (–); Tallahassee, FL |
Regular season
| November 10, 2021*; 9:00 p.m., ACCN | No. 20 | Penn | W 105–70 | 1–0 | 18 – Osborne | 13 – Osborne | 5 – Evans | Donald L. Tucker Center (9,746); Tallahassee, FL |
| November 14, 2021*; 1:00 p.m., ESPN | No. 20 | at Florida; Rivalry | L 55–71 | 1–1 | 18 – Osborne | 18 – Polite | 3 – Evans | O'Connell Center (10,011); Gainesville, FL |
| November 17, 2021*; 8:00 p.m., ACCN | | Tulane | W 59–54 | 2–1 | 13 – Mills | 10 – Tied | 3 – Tied | Donald L. Tucker Center (9,030); Tallahassee, FL |
| November 21, 2021*; 5:30 p.m., CBSSN | | vs. Loyola Marymount; Jacksonville Classic Duval semifinal | W 73–45 | 3–1 | 13 – Cleveland | 7 – Polite | 4 – Tied | UNF Arena; Jacksonville, FL |
| November 22, 2021*; 8:30 p.m., CBSSN | | vs. Missouri; Jacksonville Classic Duval championship | W 81–58 | 4–1 | 14 – Polite | 7 – Osborne | 6 – Evans | UNF Arena (1,641); Jacksonville, FL |
| November 24, 2021*; 7:00 p.m., ACCN | | Boston University; Jacksonville Classic campus game | W 81–80 ^{OT} | 5–1 | 17 – Tied | 7 – Tied | 5 – Tied | Donald L. Tucker Center (6,670); Tallahassee, FL |
| November 30, 2021*; 7:30 p.m., ESPN | | at No. 2 Purdue; ACC–Big Ten Challenge | L 65–93 | 5–2 | 22 – Mills | 4 – Tied | 5 – Polite | Mackey Arena (14,804); West Lafayette, IN |
| December 4, 2021; 4:00 p.m., ACCN | | Syracuse | L 60–63 | 5–3 (0–1) | 16 – Mills | 8 – Osborne | 4 – Polite | Donald L. Tucker Center (9,808); Tallahassee, FL |
| December 12, 2021*; 12:00 p.m., ESPN2 | | vs. South Carolina; No Room for Racism Classic | L 65–66 | 5–4 | 15 – Osborne | 9 – Osborne | 4 – Polite | Rock Hill Sports & Event Center (1,523); Rock Hill, SC |
| December 15, 2021*; 9:00 p.m., ACCN | | Lipscomb | W 97–60 | 6–4 | 25 – Polite | 7 – Butler | 6 – Mills | Donald L. Tucker Center (5,027); Tallahassee, FL |
| December 18, 2021*; 3:30 p.m., BSSUN | | vs. UCF; Orange Bowl Basketball Classic | Canceled due to COVID-19 issues | | | | | FLA Live Arena; Sunrise, FL |
| January 1, 2022; 4:00 p.m., ACCN | | at NC State | W 83–81 | 7–4 (1–1) | 19 – Osborne | 9 – Cleveland | 4 – Warley | PNC Arena (12,529); Raleigh, NC |
| January 4, 2022; 7:00 p.m., ACCRSN | | at Wake Forest | L 54–76 | 7–5 (1–2) | 13 – Cleveland | 8 – Osborne | 2 – Mills | LJVM Coliseum (4,762); Winston-Salem, NC |
| January 8, 2022; 8:00 p.m., ESPN2 | | Louisville | W 79–70 | 8–5 (2–2) | 27 – Mills | 8 – Polite | 3 – Tied | Donald L. Tucker Center (9,527); Tallahassee, FL |
| January 11, 2022; 8:00 p.m., ACCN | | Miami (FL) | W 65–64 | 9–5 (3–2) | 15 – Cleveland | 8 – Tied | 4 – Mills | Donald L. Tucker Center (10,339); Tallahassee, FL |
| January 15, 2022; 3:00 p.m., ESPN2 | | at Syracuse | W 76–71 | 10–5 (4–2) | 19 – Mills | 7 – Polite | 5 – Mills | Carrier Dome (17,287); Syracuse, NY |
| January 18, 2022; 9:00 p.m., ESPN | | No. 6 Duke | W 79–78 ^{OT} | 11–5 (5–2) | 18 – Mills | 7 – Tied | 5 – Evans | Donald L. Tucker Center (11,500); Tallahassee, FL |
| January 20, 2022*; 12:00 p.m., ACCNX | | North Florida; Rescheduled from December 21 | W 86–73 | 12–5 | 21 – Tied | 10 – Cleveland | 4 – Tied | Donald L. Tucker Center (2,088); Tallahassee, FL |
| January 22, 2022; 2:00 p.m., ESPN | | at Miami (FL) | W 61–60 | 13–5 (6–2) | 16 – Mills | 8 – Osborne | 4 – Tied | Watsco Center (7,972); Coral Gables, FL |
| January 26, 2022; 9:00 p.m., ACCN | | at Georgia Tech | L 61–75 | 13–6 (6–3) | 11 – Polite | 7 – McLeod | 4 – Evans | McCamish Pavilion (4,967); Atlanta, GA |
| January 29, 2022; 3:00 p.m., ABC | | Virginia Tech | L 72–85 | 13–7 (6–4) | 17 – Polite | 6 – Polite | 6 – Warley | Donald L. Tucker Center (11,500); Tallahassee, FL |
| February 2, 2022; 7:00 p.m., ACCN | | at Clemson | L 69–75 | 13–8 (6–5) | 16 – Mills | 5 – Polite | 3 – Butler | Littlejohn Coliseum (6,578); Clemson, SC |
| February 5, 2022; 12:00 p.m., ACCRSN | | Wake Forest | L 60–68 | 13–9 (6–6) | 15 – Mills | 13 – Prieto | 4 – Mills | Donald L. Tucker Center (10,089); Tallahassee, FL |
| February 9, 2022; 9:00 p.m., ACCN | | Pittsburgh | L 51–56 | 13–10 (6–7) | 19 – Mills | 7 – Tied | 5 – Evans | Donald L. Tucker Center (6,891); Tallahassee, FL |
| February 12, 2022; 2:00 p.m., ESPN | | at North Carolina | L 74–94 | 13–11 (6–8) | 16 – Fletcher | 10 – Fletcher | 4 – Evans | Dean Smith Center (20,348); Chapel Hill, NC |
| February 15, 2022; 7:00 p.m., ACCRSN | | Clemson | W 81–80 | 14–11 (7–8) | 28 – Evans | 8 – Fletcher | 4 – Tied | Donald L. Tucker Center (6,081); Tallahassee, FL |
| February 19, 2022; 6:00 p.m., ESPN | | at No. 9 Duke | L 70–88 | 14–12 (7–9) | 16 – Cleveland | 7 – Warley | 6 – Warley | Cameron Indoor Stadium (9,314); Durham, NC |
| February 21, 2022; 7:00 p.m., ACCN | | at Boston College; Rescheduled from December 29 | L 55–71 | 14–13 (7–10) | 18 – Cleveland | 8 – Cleveland | 6 – Warley | Conte Forum (5,441); Chestnut Hill, MA |
| February 26, 2022; 4:00 p.m., ESPN2 | | at Virginia | W 64–63 | 15–13 (8–10) | 20 – Cleveland | 6 – Prieto | 2 – Tied | John Paul Jones Arena (14,629); Charlottesville, VA |
| March 2, 2022; 7:00 p.m., ESPN2 | | Notre Dame | W 74–70 | 16–13 (9–10) | 16 – Butler | 8 – Butler | 5 – Evans | Donald L. Tucker Center (8,401); Tallahassee, Fl |
| March 5, 2022; 2:00 p.m., ESPN2 | | NC State | W 89–76 | 17–13 (10–10) | 19 – Mills | 10 – Polite | 10 – Evans | Donald L. Tucker Center (8,845); Tallahassee, FL |
ACC tournament
| March 9, 2022; 12:00 p.m., ESPN | (8) | vs. (9) Syracuse; Second Round | L 57–96 | 17–14 | 13 – Cleveland | 7 – Polite | 5 – Evans | Barclays Center; Brooklyn, NY |
*Non-conference game. ^{#}Rankings from AP Poll. (#) Tournament seedings in parentheses. All times are in Eastern Time.

== Rankings ==
Ranking movements Legend: ██ Increase in ranking ██ Decrease in ranking — = Not ranked RV = Received votes
| | Week | | | | | | | | | | | | | | | | | | | |
| Poll | Pre | 1 | 2 | 3 | 4 | 5 | 6 | 7 | 8 | 9 | 10 | 11 | 12 | 13 | 14 | 15 | 16 | 17 | 18 | Final |
|---|---|---|---|---|---|---|---|---|---|---|---|---|---|---|---|---|---|---|---|---|
| AP | 20 | RV | RV | — | — | — | — | — | — | — | — | RV | — | — | — | — | — | — | — | Not released |
| Coaches | 19 | 19* | RV | RV | — | — | — | — | RV | — | — | RV | RV | — | — | — | — | — | — | — |

*Coaches did not release a week 1 poll and the AP does not release a poll after the NCAA Tournament.
