= Mike Pegues =

American basketball player and coach (born 1978)

UConn Huskies
- Title: Assistant coach
- League: Big East Conference

Personal information
- Born: January 13, 1978 (age 48) Washington, D.C., U.S.
- Listed height: 6 ft 5 in (1.96 m)
- Listed weight: 240 lb (109 kg)

Career information
- High school: DeMatha Catholic (Hyattsville, Maryland)
- College: Delaware (1996–2000)
- NBA draft: 2000: undrafted
- Playing career: 2000–2005
- Position: Power forward
- Coaching career: 2005–present

Career history

Playing
- 2000: Titano San Marino
- 2000–2001: Connecticut Pride
- 2003: Canterbury Rams
- 2003: Otago Nuggets
- 2003–2004: Leicester Riders
- 2005: Atenas

Coaching
- 2005–2006: Friendship Collegiate Academy
- 2006–2009: Bishop O'Connell HS (assistant)
- 2009–2010: VCU (video coordinator)
- 2010–2012: Delaware (assistant)
- 2012–2018: Xavier (assistant)
- 2018–2022: Louisville (assistant)
- 2022: Louisville (interim HC)
- 2022–2026: Butler (assistant)
- 2026–present: UConn (assistant)

Career highlights
- America East Player of the Year (1999); 3× First-team All-America East (1998–2000)

Mike Pegues (born January 13, 1978) is an American men's basketball coach who is currently an assistant for the University of Connecticut men's basketball team. He previously served as an assistant and then interim head coach for the University of Louisville from 2018 to 2022. He is also known for his playing career at Delaware, where he was a three-time first-team All-America East Conference selection, as well as the league's player of the year in 1998–99.

== Playing career ==
=== High school ===
Pegues, a 6'5", 240-lb power forward from Forestville, Maryland, played at national basketball power DeMatha Catholic High School from 1992 to 1996 and was a teammate of former Philadelphia Eagles running back Brian Westbrook. His head coach was Naismith Memorial Basketball Hall of Fame inductee Morgan Wootten. During his four-year high school career he compiled an overall record of 105–26, including two #1 rankings in the Washington, D.C. area.

=== College ===
After graduating from DeMatha Catholic in 1996, Pegues enrolled at the University of Delaware on a basketball scholarship to play for head coach Mike Brey (who is, coincidentally, also a DeMatha alumnus). During a college career that spanned between 1996 and 2000, Pegues became the first player in school history to earn three first team all-conference selections as well as its first conference player of the year. He scored a still-standing Delaware record 2,030 points and guided the Fightin' Blue Hens to two NCAA tournaments (1998, 1999) and one National Invitation Tournament (2000). In both 1997–98 and 1998–99, Delaware was America East regular season and tournament champions. When he was named the America East Conference Player of the Year as a junior, Pegues averaged 21.8 points per game. Although he did not repeat as player of the year as a senior, his overall career was good enough to have him enshrined in the University of Delaware Hall of Fame in 2007.

=== Professional ===
Pegues did not get selected in the 2000 NBA draft but had a professional career that took him to Italy, England, Argentina, New Zealand and the Continental Basketball Association in the United States.

== Coaching career ==
A knee injury ended Pegues' playing career after several seasons, and he became a teacher at Friendship Collegiate Academy Public Charter School. He also coached high school and Amateur Athletic Union basketball. In 2009–10, Pegues served as the video coordinator at Virginia Commonwealth before joining the staff at Delaware in 2010–11. In 2012, Pegues was hired as an assistant for coach Chris Mack at Xavier.

In 2018, Mack took the head coaching job at Louisville and Pegues followed him there. Pegues served as acting head coach for the first six games of the 2021–22 season while Mack was suspended; he went 5–1 and won the Bahamas Championship.

On January 26, 2022, Pegues was named the interim head coach after Louisville and Mack mutually parted ways. On March 18, 2022, Pegues tenure at Louisville came to an end upon the announcement that Kenny Payne would become the next permanent head coach for the Cardinals. Following the season, Pegues was hired as an assistant for head coach Thad Matta at Butler.

== Head coaching record ==
Record table
Season	Team	Overall	Conference	Standing	Postseason
Louisville Cardinals (Atlantic Coast Conference) (2021–present)
2021–22	Louisville*	7–11	1–9	T–11th	
Louisville:		7–11 (.389)	1–9 (.100)		
Total:		7–11 (.389)			
National champion Postseason invitational champion Conference regular season champion Conference regular season and conference tournament champion Division regular season champion Division regular season and conference tournament champion Conference tournament champion

*Pegues coached the first six games of the 2021–22 season during Chris Mack's suspension and went 5–1 (0–0 ACC). Then on January 26, 2022, he took over again as the interim head coach for the rest of the year following the permanent departure of Mack.
