= 2021–22 Pittsburgh Panthers men's basketball team =

American college basketball season

2021–22 Pittsburgh Panthers men's basketball
- Conference: Atlantic Coast Conference
- Record: 11–21 (6–14 ACC)
- Head coach: Jeff Capel (4th season)
- Assistant coaches: Tim O'Toole (4th season); Milan Brown (4th season); Jason Capel (4th season)
- Home arena: Petersen Events Center (Capacity: 12,508)

2021–22 ACC men's basketball standings
	Conf.				Overall
Team	W		L	PCT	W		L	PCT
No. 9 Duke	16	–	4	.800	32	–	7	.821
North Carolina	15	–	5	.750	29	–	10	.744
Notre Dame	15	–	5	.750	24	–	11	.686
Miami (FL)	14	–	6	.700	26	–	11	.703
Wake Forest	13	–	7	.650	25	–	10	.714
Virginia	12	–	8	.600	21	–	14	.600
Virginia Tech †	11	–	9	.550	23	–	13	.639
Florida State	10	–	10	.500	17	–	14	.548
Syracuse	9	–	11	.450	16	–	17	.485
Clemson	8	–	12	.400	17	–	16	.515
Louisville	6	–	14	.300	13	–	19	.406
Boston College	6	–	14	.300	13	–	20	.394
Pittsburgh	6	–	14	.300	11	–	21	.344
Georgia Tech	5	–	15	.250	12	–	20	.375
NC State	4	–	16	.200	11	–	21	.344
† 2022 ACC tournament winner Rankings from AP poll

The 2021–22 Pittsburgh Panthers men's basketball team represented the University of Pittsburgh during the 2021–22 NCAA Division I men's basketball season. The Panthers were led by fourth-year head coach Jeff Capel and played their home games at the Petersen Events Center in Pittsburgh, Pennsylvania as members of the Atlantic Coast Conference.

The Panthers finished the season 11–21 overall and 6–14 in ACC play to finish in a three way tie for eleventh place. As the twelfth seed in the ACC tournament, they lost to thirteenth seed Boston College in the First Round. They were not invited to the NCAA tournament or the NIT.

== Previous season ==
In a season limited due to the ongoing COVID-19 pandemic, the Panthers finished the 2020–21 season 10–12, 6–10 in ACC play to finish in 12th place. They lost to Miami in the first round of the ACC tournament.

== Offseason ==
=== Departures ===
Departures
Name	Number	Pos.	Height	Weight	Year	Hometown	Reason for departure
Xavier Johnson	1	G	6'3"	200	Junior	Woodbridge, VA	Transferred to Indiana
Gerald Drumgoole	4	G/F	6'5"	200	Sophomore	Rochester, NY	Transferred to Albany
Au'Diese Toney	5	G	6'6"	210	Junior	Huntsville, AL	Transferred to Arkansas
Justin Champagnie	11	F	6'6"	200	Sophomore	Brooklyn, NY	Declare for 2021 NBA draft
Abdoul Karim Coulibaly	12	F	6'8"	215	Sophomore	Bamako, Mali	Transferred to St. Bonaventure
Terrell Brown	21	F/C	6'10"	235	Senior	Providence, RI	Graduate transferred to San Diego

=== Incoming transfers ===
Incoming transfers
Name	Number	Pos.	Height	Weight	Year	Hometown	Previous school
Chris Payton	1	F	6'7"	220	Junior	Bloomington, IL	Indian Hills CC
Daniel Oladapo	4	F	6'7"	220	Senior	Bladensburg, MD	Oakland
Jamarius Burton	11	G	6'4"	200	Senior	Charlotte, NC	Texas Tech
Mouhamadou Gueye	21	F	6'10"	200	Graduate Student	Staten Island, NY	Stony Brook

=== Recruiting classes ===
==== 2021 recruiting class ====
College recruiting information
Name	Hometown	School	Height	Weight	Commit date
Nate Santos; SF	Windsor, CT	The Loomis Chaffee School	6 ft 7 in (2.01 m)	205 lb (93 kg)	Apr 6, 2021
Nate Santos; SF	Recruit ratings: Scout: Rivals: 247Sports:				
Overall recruit ranking: Scout: 27 Rivals: 22
Note: In many cases, Scout, Rivals, 247Sports, On3, and ESPN may conflict in their listings of height and weight.; In these cases, the average was taken. ESPN grades are on a 100-point scale.; Sources: "Pittsburgh Panthers". ESPN.; "2021 Team Ranking". Rivals.

==== 2022 recruiting class ====
College recruiting information (2022)
Name	Hometown	School	Height	Weight	Commit date
Dior Johnson #6 PG	Lakewood, CA	Southern California Academy	6 ft 7 in (2.01 m)	205 lb (93 kg)	Jun 13, 2022
Dior Johnson #6 PG	Recruit ratings: Scout: Rivals: 247Sports: ESPN: (88)				
Overall recruit ranking: Scout: 27 Rivals: 22
Note: In many cases, Scout, Rivals, 247Sports, On3, and ESPN may conflict in their listings of height and weight.; In these cases, the average was taken. ESPN grades are on a 100-point scale.; Sources: "Pittsburgh Panthers". ESPN.; "2021 Team Ranking". Rivals.

== Roster ==
2021–22 Pittsburgh Panthers men's basketball team
Players
Coaches

Pos.	#	Name	Height	Weight	Year	Previous school	Hometown
F	1	Chris Payton	6 ft 7 in (2.01 m)	210 lb (95 kg)	Jr	Bloomington HS; Indian Hills CC	Bloomington, IL
G	2	Femi Odukale	6 ft 5 in (1.96 m)	205 lb (93 kg)	So	Bishop Loughlin HS	Brooklyn, NY
F	3	Noah Collier	6 ft 9 in (2.06 m)	220 lb (100 kg)	So	Westtown School	Mullica Hill, NJ
F	4	Daniel Oladapo	6 ft 7 in (2.01 m)	220 lb (100 kg)	Sr	Bladensburg HS; Oakland	Bladensburg, MD
F	5	Nate Santos	6 ft 7 in (2.01 m)	215 lb (98 kg)	Fr	Loomis Chaffee School	Geneva, IL
G	11	Jamarius Burton	6 ft 4 in (1.93 m)	200 lb (91 kg)	Sr	Independence HS; Texas Tech	Charlotte, NC
G	12	Ithiel Horton (S)	6 ft 3 in (1.91 m)	200 lb (91 kg)	RS Jr	Roselle Catholic; Delaware	Vauxhall, NJ
F	13	Aidan Fisch (W)	6 ft 5 in (1.96 m)	185 lb (84 kg)	Sr	Franklin Regional HS	Murrysville, PA
G	14	Curtis Aiken Jr. (W)	6 ft 1 in (1.85 m)	200 lb (91 kg)	RS Jr	North Allegheny Senior HS	Pittsburgh, PA
F	15	Mouhamadou Gueye	6 ft 10 in (2.08 m)	210 lb (95 kg)	GS	Curtis HS; Stony Brook	Staten Island, NY
G	22	Nike Sibande (injured)	6 ft 4 in (1.93 m)	185 lb (84 kg)	RS Sr	Crispus Attacuks HS; Miami (OH)	Indianapolis, IN
F	23	John Hugley	6 ft 8 in (2.03 m)	240 lb (109 kg)	So	Brush HS	Cleveland, OH
G/F	24	William Jeffress	6 ft 7 in (2.01 m)	205 lb (93 kg)	So	McDowell HS	Erie, PA
G	31	Onyebuchi Ezeakudo (W)	6 ft 1 in (1.85 m)	200 lb (91 kg)	Sr	Homestead HS	Fort Wayne, IN
C	35	Max Amadasun	6 ft 9 in (2.06 m)	230 lb (104 kg)	So	Our Saviour Lutheran	Dublin, Ireland
G	42	Chayce Smith (W)	6 ft 3 in (1.91 m)	185 lb (84 kg)	Sr	The Kiski School	Mount Laurel, NJ

Head coach

- Jeff Capel (Duke)

Assistant coach(es)

- Tim O'Toole (Fairfield)
- Milan Brown (Howard)
- Jason Capel (North Carolina)

Legend

- (C) Team captain
- (S) Suspended
- (I) Ineligible
- (W) Walk-on
- Injured
- Current redshirt

Roster

== Schedule and results ==
Date time, TV	Rank^{#}	Opponent^{#}	Result	Record	High points	High rebounds	High assists	Site (attendance) city, state
Exhibition
November 1, 2021*; 7:00 p.m., ACCNX		Gannon	W 89–64	–	20 – Odukale	10 – Gueye	3 – Tied	Petersen Events Center; Pittsburgh, PA
Regular season
November 9, 2021*; 7:00 p.m., ACCNX		The Citadel	L 63–78	0–1	27 – Hugley	10 – Hugley	4 – Odukale	Petersen Events Center (7,585); Pittsburgh, PA
November 12, 2021*; 8:30 p.m., ESPNU		at West Virginia; Backyard Brawl	L 59–74	0–2	17 – Hugley	7 – Jeffress	4 – Odukale	WVU Coliseum (14,100); Morgantown, WV
November 16, 2021*; 7:00 p.m., ACCNX		UNC Wilmington	W 59–51	1–2	15 – Odukale	11 – Hugley	3 – Tied	Petersen Events Center (7,261); Pittsburgh, PA
November 19, 2021*; 6:00 p.m., ACCN		Towson	W 63–59	2–2	14 – Santos	8 – Santos	4 – 3 tied	Petersen Events Center (7,612); Pittsburgh, PA
November 24, 2021*; 9:00 p.m., ACCN		Vanderbilt	L 52–68	2–3	14 – Odukale	6 – Tied	2 – 3 tied	Petersen Events Center (7,460); Pittsburgh, PA
November 27, 2021*; 2:00 p.m., ACCNX		UMBC	L 77–87	2–4	24 – Hugley	8 – Jeffress	6 – Burton	Petersen Events Center (7,400); Pittsburgh, PA
November 30, 2021*; 7:00 p.m., ESPNU		Minnesota; ACC–Big Ten Challenge	L 53–54	2–5	25 – Hugley	14 – Hugley	5 – Odukale	Petersen Events Center (7,736); Pittsburgh, PA
December 3, 2021; 8:00 p.m., ACCN		at Virginia	L 56–57	2–6 (0–1)	12 – Hugley	6 – Tied	4 – Burton	John Paul Jones Arena (14,257); Charlottesville, VA
December 9, 2021*; 8:00 p.m., ACCN		Colgate; Gotham Classic	W 71–68	3–6	22 – Hugley	7 – Hugley	3 – Odukale	Petersen Events Center (7,328); Pittsburgh, PA
December 12, 2021*; 7:00 p.m., ACCN		Monmouth; Gotham Classic	L 52–56	3–7	15 – Burton	13 – Hugley	2 – Tied	Petersen Events Center (7,579); Pittsburgh, PA
December 18, 2021*; 12:00 p.m., FS1		vs. St. John's; Gotham Classic	W 59–57	4–7	20 – Burton	8 – Hugley	3 – Odukale	Madison Square Garden (5,177); New York, NY
December 21, 2021*; 2:00 p.m., ACCNX		Jacksonville	W 64–55	5–7	28 – Odukale	12 – Gueye	4 – Gueye	Petersen Events Center (7,392); Pittsburgh, PA
December 28, 2021; 8:00 p.m., ESPN2		Notre Dame	L 67–68	5–8 (0–2)	18 – Hugley	6 – Hugley	3 – 3 tied	Petersen Events Center (8,656); Pittsburgh, PA
January 5, 2022; 7:00 p.m., ESPNU		at Louisville	L 72–75	5–9 (0–3)	21 – Burton	7 – Hugley	3 – Odukale	KFC Yum! Center (11,973); Louisville, KY
January 8, 2022; 4:00 p.m., ACCN		Boston College	W 69–67	6–9 (1–3)	32 – Hugley	13 – Hugley	4 – Odukale	Petersen Events Center (7,876); Pittsburgh, PA
January 11, 2022; 7:00 p.m., ESPNU		at Syracuse	L 61–77	6–10 (1–4)	14 – 3 tied	10 – Gueye	4 – Gueye	Carrier Dome (15,214); Syracuse, NY
January 15, 2022; 4:00 p.m., ACCN		Louisville	W 65–53	7–10 (2–4)	20 – Burton	8 – Burton	4 – Burton	Petersen Events Center (8,431); Pittsburgh, PA
January 19, 2021; 9:00 p.m., ACCN		Virginia	L 61–66	7–11 (2–5)	23 – Hugley	7 – Hugley	3 – Tied	Petersen Events Center (7,595); Pittsburgh, PA
January 22, 2022; 4:00 p.m., ACCN		at Clemson	L 48–75	7–12 (2–6)	15 – Hugley	8 – Hugley	3 – Odukale	Littlejohn Coliseum (7,408); Clemson, SC
January 25, 2022; 8:00 p.m., ACCN		Syracuse	W 64–53	8–12 (3–6)	21 – Burton	18 – Hugley	5 – Burton	Petersen Events Center (8,066); Pittsburgh, PA
January 30, 2022; 4:00 p.m., ACCN		at Boston College	L 56–69	8–13 (3–7)	16 – Odukale	9 – Gueye	2 – Tied	Conte Forum (4,507); Chestnut Hill, MA
February 2, 2022; 7:00 p.m., ESPN2		at Wake Forest	L 75–91	8–14 (3–8)	23 – Odukale	12 – Hugley	5 – Burton	LJVM Coliseum (5,328); Winston-Salem, NC
February 5, 2022; 7:00 p.m., ACCN		Virginia Tech	L 71–76	8–15 (3–9)	25 – Odukale	6 – Burton	4 – Burton	Petersen Events Center (8,533); Pittsburgh, PA
February 7, 2022; 7:00 p.m., ACCN		at Virginia Tech; Rescheduled from January 1	L 47–74	8–16 (3–10)	16 – Odukale	5 – Collier	4 – Odukale	Cassell Coliseum (8,925); Blacksburg, VA
February 9, 2022; 9:00 p.m., ACCN		at Florida State	W 56–51	9–16 (4–10)	25 – Horton	8 – Hugley	6 – Odukale	Donald L. Tucker Civic Center (6,891); Tallahassee, FL
February 12, 2022; 3:00 p.m., ACCN		NC State	W 71–69	10–16 (5–10)	21 – Hugley	10 – Hugley	6 – Hugley	Petersen Events Center (8,027); Pittsburgh, PA
February 16, 2022; 8:00 p.m., ACCN		at North Carolina	W 76–67	11–16 (6–10)	19 – Horton	7 – Burton	9 – Odukale	Dean Smith Center (17,270); Chapel Hill, NC
February 19, 2022; 7:00 p.m., ACCN		Georgia Tech	L 62–68	11–17 (6–11)	27 – Gueye	12 – Gueye	7 – Burton	Petersen Events Center (9,085); Pittsburgh, PA
February 22, 2022; 8:00 p.m., ACCN		Miami (FL)	L 64–85	11–18 (6–12)	20 – Hugley	7 – Hugley	3 – Odukale	Petersen Events Center (7,360); Pittsburgh, PA
March 1, 2022; 8:00 p.m., ACCN		No. 4 Duke	L 56–86	11–19 (6–13)	19 – Hugley	9 – Gueye	4 – Odukale	Petersen Events Center (12,095); Pittsburgh, PA
March 5, 2022; 2:30 p.m., ESPNews		at Notre Dame	L 54–78	11–20 (6–14)	13 – Tied	8 – Gueye	4 – Burton	Edmund P. Joyce Center (8,555); South Bend, IN
ACC tournament
March 8, 2022; 2:00 p.m., ACCN	(12)	vs. (13) Boston College; First round	L 46–66	11–21	15 – Hugley	8 – Hugley	3 – Gueye	Barclays Center (6,222); Brooklyn, NY
*Non-conference game. ^{#}Rankings from AP Poll. (#) Tournament seedings in parentheses. All times are in Eastern Time.

== Rankings ==
Ranking movements Legend: — = Not ranked
	Week																			
Poll	Pre	1	2	3	4	5	6	7	8	9	10	11	12	13	14	15	16	17	18	Final
AP	—	—	—	—	—	—	—	—	—	—	—	—	—	—	—	—	—	—	—	Not released
Coaches	—	—	—	—	—	—	—	—	—	—	—	—	—	—	—	—	—	—	—	—

*AP does not release post-NCAA tournament rankings
^Coaches did not release a Week 2 poll.
