= 2021–22 Wake Forest Demon Deacons men's basketball team =

American college basketball season

2021–22 Wake Forest Demon Deacons men's basketball

NIT, Quarterfinals
- Conference: Atlantic Coast Conference
- Record: 25–10 (13–7 ACC)
- Head coach: Steve Forbes (2nd season)
- Assistant coaches: BJ McKie; Jason Shay; Brooks Savage
- Home arena: LJVM Coliseum

2021–22 ACC men's basketball standings
	Conf.				Overall
Team	W		L	PCT	W		L	PCT
No. 9 Duke	16	–	4	.800	32	–	7	.821
North Carolina	15	–	5	.750	29	–	10	.744
Notre Dame	15	–	5	.750	24	–	11	.686
Miami (FL)	14	–	6	.700	26	–	11	.703
Wake Forest	13	–	7	.650	25	–	10	.714
Virginia	12	–	8	.600	21	–	14	.600
Virginia Tech †	11	–	9	.550	23	–	13	.639
Florida State	10	–	10	.500	17	–	14	.548
Syracuse	9	–	11	.450	16	–	17	.485
Clemson	8	–	12	.400	17	–	16	.515
Louisville	6	–	14	.300	13	–	19	.406
Boston College	6	–	14	.300	13	–	20	.394
Pittsburgh	6	–	14	.300	11	–	21	.344
Georgia Tech	5	–	15	.250	12	–	20	.375
NC State	4	–	16	.200	11	–	21	.344
† 2022 ACC tournament winner Rankings from AP poll

The 2021–22 Wake Forest Demon Deacons men's basketball team represented Wake Forest University during the 2021–22 NCAA Division I men's basketball season. The Demon Deacons were led by second-year head coach Steve Forbes and played their home games at the Lawrence Joel Veterans Memorial Coliseum in Winston-Salem, North Carolina as members of the Atlantic Coast Conference.

The Demon Deacons finished the season 25–10 overall and 13–7 in ACC play, to finish in fifth place. They lost to Boston College in the Second Round of the ACC tournament. They received an at-large bid to the NIT, where they defeated Towson and VCU in the first two rounds. Their season then ended in a quarterfinal loss to Texas A&M.

== Previous season ==
The Demon Deacons finished 2020–21 season 6–16, 3–15 in ACC play, to finish in fourteenth place. They lost to Notre Dame in the First Round of the ACC tournament. They were not invited to either the NCAA tournament or NIT.

== Offseason ==
=== Departures ===
Departures
Name	Number	Pos.	Height	Weight	Year	Hometown	Reason for departure
Jahcobi Neath	0	G	6'3"	200	Sophomore	Toronto, ON	Transferred to Wisconsin
Jalen Johnson	2	G	6'6"	195	Graduate Student	Durham, NC	Graduated transferred to Mercer
Ian DuBose	11	G	6'4"	225	Graduate Student	Durham, NC	Graduated
Quadry Adams	13	G	6'3"	190	Freshman	Piscataway, NJ	Transferred to St. Bonaventure
Jonah Antonio	20	G	6'5"	195	Graduate Student	Perth, Australia	Graduated
Isaiah Wilikins	23	G	6'4"	220	Junior	Winston-Salem, NC	Transferred to Longwood
Ismael Massoud	25	F	6'8"	220	Sophomore	East Harlem, NY	Transferred to Kansas State
Emmanuel Okpomoy	30	C	6'10"	225	Freshman	Jackson, MS	Transferred to Temple
Blake Buchanan	31	F	6'5"	205	Junior	Durham, NC	Transferred
Ody Oguama	33	F	6'9"	225	Sophomore	Raleigh, NC	Transferred to Cincinnati
Sunday Okeke	34	F	6'8"	250	Senior	Lagos, Nigeria	Walk-on; graduated

=== Incoming transfers ===
Incoming transfers
Name	Number	Pos.	Height	Weight	Year	Hometown	Previous school
Jake LaRavia	0	F	6'8"	235	Junior	Indianapolis, IN	Indiana State
Dallas Walton	13	F/C	7'0"	230	Graduate Student	Arvada, CO	Colorado
Khadim Sy	20	F	6'10"	240	Graduate Student	Dakar, Senegal	Ole Miss
Damari Monsanto	30	G	6'6"	225	RS Sophomore	Pembroke Pines, FL	East Tennessee State
Alondes Williams	31	G	6'5"	210	Graduate Student	Milwaukee, WI	Oklahoma

=== 2021 recruiting class ===
College recruiting information
Name	Hometown	School	Height	Weight	Commit date
Robert McCray V #38 SG	Columbia, SC	A. C. Flora High School	6 ft 4 in (1.93 m)	195 lb (88 kg)	Jul 15, 2020
Robert McCray V #38 SG	Recruit ratings: Scout: Rivals: 247Sports: ESPN: (79)				
Lucas Taylor #47 SG	Wake Forest, NC	Heritage High School	6 ft 6 in (1.98 m)	185 lb (84 kg)	Apr 2, 2021
Lucas Taylor #47 SG	Recruit ratings: Scout: Rivals: 247Sports: ESPN: (78)				
Cameron Hildreth; SG	Worthing, England	Surrey Scorchers	6 ft 4 in (1.93 m)	185 lb (84 kg)	09/24/2020
Cameron Hildreth; SG	Recruit ratings: Scout: Rivals: 247Sports: ESPN: (NR)				
Matthew Marsh; C	Cornwall, England		6 ft 11 in (2.11 m)	240 lb (110 kg)	07/30/2021
Matthew Marsh; C	Recruit ratings: Scout: Rivals: 247Sports: ESPN: (NR)				
Overall recruit ranking:
Note: In many cases, Scout, Rivals, 247Sports, On3, and ESPN may conflict in their listings of height and weight.; In these cases, the average was taken. ESPN grades are on a 100-point scale.; Sources: "Wake Forest Demon Deacons". ESPN.; "2021 Team Ranking". Rivals.

== Roster ==
2021–22 Wake Forest Demon Deacons men's basketball team
Players
Coaches

Pos.	#	Name	Height	Weight	Year	Previous school	Hometown
F	0	Jake LaRavia	6 ft 8 in (2.03 m)	235 lb (107 kg)	Jr	Lawrence Central; Indiana State	Indianapolis, IN
F	1	Isaiah Mucius	6 ft 8 in (2.03 m)	205 lb (93 kg)	Sr	Brewster Academy	East Patchogue, NY
G	2	Cameron Hildreth	6 ft 4 in (1.93 m)	195 lb (88 kg)	Fr	Surrey Scorchers	Worthing, England
G	4	Daivien Williamson	6 ft 1 in (1.85 m)	180 lb (82 kg)	Sr	Winston-Salem Prep; ETSU	Winston-Salem, NC
G	11	Carter Whitt	6 ft 3 in (1.91 m)	180 lb (82 kg)	RS Fr	Leesville Road	Raleigh, NC
F/C	13	Dallas Walton	7 ft 0 in (2.13 m)	230 lb (104 kg)	GS	Arvada West; Colorado	Arvada, CO
F	20	Khadim Sy	6 ft 10 in (2.08 m)	240 lb (109 kg)	GS	Oak Hill Academy; Ole Miss	Dakar, Senegal
G	23	Lucas Taylor	6 ft 5 in (1.96 m)	195 lb (88 kg)	Fr	Heritage	Wake Forest, NC
G	25	Robert McCray	6 ft 4 in (1.93 m)	185 lb (84 kg)	Fr	AC Flora	Columbia, SC
G	30	Damari Monsanto	6 ft 6 in (1.98 m)	225 lb (102 kg)	RS So	Western; East Tennessee State	Pembroke Pines, FL
G	31	Alondes Williams	6 ft 5 in (1.96 m)	210 lb (95 kg)	GS	Riverside; Oklahoma	Milwaukee, WI
F/C	33	Matthew Marsh	7 ft 1 in (2.16 m)	250 lb (113 kg)	Fr	ASVEL Lyon-Villeurbanne	Cornwall, England
G	40	RJ Kennah (W)	6 ft 5 in (1.96 m)	180 lb (82 kg)	Fr	Kent Denver	Parker, CO
G	45	Anthony Mathis Jr. (W)	6 ft 0 in (1.83 m)	185 lb (84 kg)	RS Sr	Kentucky Country Day	Louisville, KY
G	51	Kevin Dunn (W)	6 ft 2 in (1.88 m)	205 lb (93 kg)	Fr	Choate Rosemary Hall	Winston-Salem, NC
F	52	Grant van Beveren (W)	6 ft 6 in (1.98 m)	215 lb (98 kg)	Jr	Chattahoochee	Alpharetta, GA
G	55	Miles Lester (W)	6 ft 0 in (1.83 m)	180 lb (82 kg)	RS Sr	Wilbraham & Monson Academy; Rice	Wichita, KS

Head coach

- Steve Forbes (Southern Arkansas University)

Assistant coach(es)

- Brooks Savage (Tennessee)
- Jason Shay (Western Illinois)
- BJ McKie (South Carolina)

Legend

- (C) Team captain
- (S) Suspended
- (I) Ineligible
- (W) Walk-on
- Injured
- Current redshirt

Roster

== Schedule and results ==
Date time, TV	Rank^{#}	Opponent^{#}	Result	Record	High points	High rebounds	High assists	Site (attendance) city, state
Exhibition
November 5, 2021*; 7:00 p.m.		Winston-Salem State	W 88–56	–	16 – Tied	10 – Laravia	4 – Tied	LJVM Coliseum (3,754); Winston-Salem, NC
Regular season
November 10, 2021*; 7:00 p.m., ACCNX		William & Mary	W 77–59	1–0	22 – Williams	7 – Whitt	4 – Tied	LJVM Coliseum (3,710); Winston-Salem, NC
November 12, 2021*; 7:30 p.m., ACCNX		Western Carolina	W 87–75	2–0	32 – Williams	8 – Williams	4 – Williams	LJVM Coliseum (4,359); Winston-Salem, NC
November 17, 2021*; 7:00 p.m., ACCNX		Charleston Southern	W 95–59	3–0	24 – LaRavia	8 – Hildreth	7 – Whitt	LJVM Coliseum (3,349); Winston-Salem, NC
November 20, 2021*; 2:00 p.m., ACCNX		North Carolina A&T; Emerald Coast Classic campus-site game	W 87–63	4–0	19 – Williams	6 – Sy	5 – LaRavia	LJVM Coliseum (3,470); Winston-Salem, NC
November 23, 2021*; 8:00 p.m., ACCN		Kennesaw State	W 92–61	5–0	19 – LaRavia	7 – 3 tied	6 – LaRavia	LJVM Coliseum (3,554); Winston-Salem, NC
November 26, 2021*; 6:30 p.m., CBSSN		vs. Oregon State; Emerald Coast Classic semifinals	W 80–77 ^{OT}	6–0	24 – Williams	7 – LaRavia	5 – LaRavia	The Arena at NFSC (2,146); Niceville, FL
November 27, 2021*; 7:00 p.m., CBSSN		vs. LSU; Emerald Coast Classic	L 61–75	6–1	20 – Williamson	10 – Walton	4 – Hildreth	The Arena at NFSC (1,700); Niceville, FL
November 30, 2021*; 9:00 p.m., ESPNU		Northwestern; ACC–Big Ten Challenge	W 77–73 ^{OT}	7–1	21 – Tied	9 – Williams	4 – Williams	LJVM Coliseum (3,711); Winston-Salem, NC
December 4, 2021; 2:00 p.m., ACCN		at Virginia Tech	W 80–61	8–1 (1–0)	19 – Williamson	7 – Tied	9 – Williams	Cassell Coliseum (8,925); Blacksburg, VA
December 11, 2021*; 7:00 p.m., ACCRSN		USC Upstate	W 79–53	9–1	16 – Tied	14 – Williams	10 – Williams	LJVM Coliseum (4,296); Winston-Salem, NC
December 14, 2021*; 7:00 p.m., ACCRSN		VMI	W 77–70	10–1	36 – Williams	9 – Walton	3 – Williams	LJVM Coliseum (3,587); Winston-Salem, NC
December 17, 2021*; 9:00 p.m., ACCN		vs. Charlotte; Basketball Hall of Fame Shootout	W 82–79	11–1	34 – Williams	8 – Tied	7 – Williams	Spectrum Center (0); Charlotte, NC
December 29, 2021; 9:00 p.m., ACCN		at Louisville	L 69–73	11–2 (1–1)	15 – Tied	7 – Tied	7 – Williams	KFC Yum! Center (14,120); Louisville, KY
January 1, 2022; 7:00 p.m., ESPNU		at Miami (FL)	L 84–92	11–3 (1–2)	19 – LaRavia	7 – laRavia	7 – Williams	Watsco Center (3,376); Coral Gables, FL
January 4, 2022; 7:00 p.m., ACCRSN		Florida State	W 76–54	12–3 (2–2)	22 – LaRavia	10 – Sy	5 – LaRavia	LJVM Coliseum (4,762); Winston-Salem, NC
January 8, 2022; 2:00 p.m., ACCRSN		Syracuse	W 77–74 ^{OT}	13–3 (3–2)	25 – Williams	12 – Williams	6 – Whitt	LJVM Coliseum (7,220); Winston-Salem, NC
January 12, 2022; 7:00 p.m., ACCN		No. 8 Duke	L 64–76	13–4 (3–3)	25 – Williams	8 – Walton	4 – Williams	LJVM Coliseum (14,213); Winston-Salem, NC
January 15, 2022; 4:30 p.m., ACCN		at Virginia	W 63–55	14–4 (4–3)	15 – LaRavia	8 – Williams	4 – Williams	John Paul Jones Arena (13,924); Charlottesville, VA
January 19, 2022; 7:00 p.m., ESPNU		at Georgia Tech	W 80–64	15–4 (5–3)	19 – Williams	8 – Monsanto	9 – Tied	McCamish Pavilion (4,698); Atlanta, GA
January 22, 2022; 8:00 p.m., ACCN		North Carolina; Rivalry	W 98–76	16–4 (6–3)	31 – LaRavia	10 – LaRavia	4 – LaRavia	LJVM Coliseum (11,898); Winston-Salem, NC
January 24, 2022; 6:00 p.m., ACCN		Boston College; Rescheduled from December 22	W 87–57	17–4 (7–3)	20 – Williams	10 – LaRavia	7 – Williams	LVJM Coliseum (4,928); Winston-Salem, NC
January 29, 2022; 8:00 p.m., ACCN		at Syracuse	L 72–94	17–5 (7–4)	27 – Williamson	7 – Williams	5 – LaRavia	Carrier Dome (23,194); Syracuse, NY
February 2, 2022; 7:00 p.m., ESPN2		Pittsburgh	W 91–75	18–5 (8–4)	18 – LaRavia	10 – Williams	9 – Williams	LJVM Coliseum (5,328); Winston-Salem, NC
February 5, 2022; 12:00 p.m., ACCRSN		at Florida State	W 68–60	19–5 (9–4)	23 – Williams	13 – LaRavia	9 – LaRavia	Donald L. Tucker Civic Center (10,089); Tallahassee, FL
February 9, 2022; 8:00 p.m., ACCN		at NC State; Rivalry	W 69–51	20–5 (10–4)	17 – Williams	10 – Williams	8 – LaRavia	PNC Arena (11,635); Raleigh, NC
February 12, 2022; 3:00 p.m., ACCRSN		Miami (FL)	L 72–76	20–6 (10–5)	25 – Williams	7 – Sy	4 – Williams	LJVM Coliseum (7,698); Winston-Salem, NC
February 15, 2022; 7:00 p.m., ESPN		at No. 9 Duke	L 74–76	20–7 (10–6)	19 – LaRavia	10 – LaRavia	4 – Williams	Cameron Indoor Stadium (9,314); Durham, NC
February 19, 2022; 1:00 p.m., ACCRSN		Notre Dame	W 79–74	21–7 (11–6)	23 – Williams	10 – Tied	5 – LaRavia	LJVM Coliseum (8,355); Winston-Salem, NC
February 23, 2022; 7:00 p.m., ACCN		at Clemson	L 69–80	21–8 (11–7)	17 – Monsanto	8 – LaRavia	4 – Williams	Littlejohn Coliseum (5,782); Clemson, SC
February 26, 2021; 7:00 p.m., ACCN		Louisville	W 99–77	22–8 (12–7)	23 – LaRavia	7 – LaRavia	5 – Tied	LJVM Coliseum (8,139); Winston-Salem, NC
March 2, 2022; 9:00 p.m., ACCRSN		NC State; Rivalry	W 101–76	23–8 (13–7)	28 – Williamson	12 – Walton	11 – Williams	LJVM Coliseum (6,917); Winston-Salem, NC
ACC tournament
March 9, 2022; 2:30 p.m., ESPN	(5)	vs. (13) Boston College; Second Round	L 77–82 ^{OT}	23–9	21 – LaRavia	7 – LaRavia	4 – Tied	Barclays Center; Brooklyn, NY
NIT
March 16, 2022; 7:00 p.m., ESPN+	(2)	Towson; First Round – Texas A&M Bracket	W 74–64	24–9	17 – Walton	8 – LaRavia	5 – Tied	LJVM Coliseum (4,081); Winston-Salem, NC
March 19, 2022; 4:00 p.m., ESPN+	(2)	(3) VCU; Second Round – Texas A&M Bracket	W 80–74	25–9	19 – Williams	7 – Walton	5 – Williams	LJVM Coliseum (4,341); Winston-Salem, NC
March 23, 2022; 7:00 p.m., ESPN2	(2)	at (1) Texas A&M; Quarterfinals – Texas A&M Bracket	L 52–67	25–10	15 – Mucius	11 – Walton	4 – Williams	Reed Arena (8,201); College Station, TX
*Non-conference game. ^{#}Rankings from AP Poll. (#) Tournament seedings in parentheses. All times are in Eastern Time.

== Rankings ==
Ranking movements Legend: ██ Increase in ranking ██ Decrease in ranking — = Not ranked RV = Received votes
	Week																			
Poll	Pre	1	2	3	4	5	6	7	8	9	10	11	12	13	14	15	16	17	18	Final
AP					RV	—		RV	RV	—			RV	—	RV	RV	RV	—	—	Not released
Coaches					RV	—	RV	RV	—			RV	RV	25	RV	RV	RV	RV	RV	—

*AP does not release post-NCAA tournament rankings
^Coaches did not release a Week 2 poll.
