= 2021–22 Syracuse Orange men's basketball team =

Basketball season

2021–22 Syracuse Orange men's basketball
- Conference: Atlantic Coast Conference
- Record: 16–17 (9–11 ACC)
- Head coach: Jim Boeheim (46th season)
- Assistant coaches: Adrian Autry; Gerry McNamara; Allen Griffin
- Offensive scheme: Ball-Screen Motion
- Base defense: 2–3 Zone
- Home arena: Carrier Dome

2021–22 ACC men's basketball standings
	Conf.				Overall
Team	W		L	PCT	W		L	PCT
No. 9 Duke	16	–	4	.800	32	–	7	.821
North Carolina	15	–	5	.750	29	–	10	.744
Notre Dame	15	–	5	.750	24	–	11	.686
Miami (FL)	14	–	6	.700	26	–	11	.703
Wake Forest	13	–	7	.650	25	–	10	.714
Virginia	12	–	8	.600	21	–	14	.600
Virginia Tech †	11	–	9	.550	23	–	13	.639
Florida State	10	–	10	.500	17	–	14	.548
Syracuse	9	–	11	.450	16	–	17	.485
Clemson	8	–	12	.400	17	–	16	.515
Louisville	6	–	14	.300	13	–	19	.406
Boston College	6	–	14	.300	13	–	20	.394
Pittsburgh	6	–	14	.300	11	–	21	.344
Georgia Tech	5	–	15	.250	12	–	20	.375
NC State	4	–	16	.200	11	–	21	.344
† 2022 ACC tournament winner Rankings from AP poll

The 2021–22 Syracuse Orange men's basketball team represented Syracuse University during the 2021–22 NCAA Division I men's basketball season. The Orange were led by 46th-year head coach Jim Boeheim and played their home games at the Carrier Dome in Syracuse, New York as ninth-year members of the Atlantic Coast Conference.

The Orange finished the season 16–17 overall and 9–11 in ACC play to finish in ninth place. As the ninth seed in the ACC tournament, they defeated eighth seed Florida State in the Second Round before losing to first seed Duke in the Quarterfinals. They were not invited to the NCAA tournament or the NIT.

== Previous season ==
The Orange finished the 2020–21 season 18–10, 9–7 in ACC play, to finish in eight place. In the ACC tournament, they defeated NC State in the Second Round before losing to Virginia in the Quarterfinals. They received an at-large bid to the NCAA tournament as an eleven seed in the Midwest Region. In the tournament, they defeated six seed San Diego State in the First Round and three seed West Virginia in the Second Round, before losing to two seed Houston in the Sweet Sixteen.

== Offseason ==
=== Departures ===
Departures
Name	Number	Pos.	Height	Weight	Year	Hometown	Reason for departure
Alan Griffin	0	F	6'5"	190	Junior	Ossining, NY	Declare for 2021 NBA draft
Quincy Guerrier	1	F	6'7"	220	Sophomore	Montreal, QC	Transferred to Oregon
Kadary Richmond	3	G	6'5"	180	Freshman	Brooklyn, NY	Transferred to Seton Hall
Woody Newton	4	F	6'8"	200	Freshman	District Heights, MD	Transferred to Oklahoma State
Robert Braswell	20	F	6'7"	206	RS Sophomore	Jacksonville, FL	Transferred to Charlotte
Marek Dolezaj	21	F	6'10"	201	Senior	Bratislava, Slovakia	Graduated/went undrafted 2021 NBA draft/signed with BC Ternopil of the Ukrainian Basketball SuperLeague
Jaylen Bartley	23	G	6'2"	173	Junior	Atlanta, GA	Walk-on; didn't return

=== Incoming transfers ===
Incoming Transfers
Name	Number	Pos.	Height	Weight	Year	Hometown	Previous school
Jimmy Boeheim	0	F	6'8"	225	Graduate Student	Fayetteville, NY	Cornell
Paddy Casey	1	G	6'0"	200	Graduate Student	Scranton, PA	USciences
Symir Torrence	10	G	6'3"	195	Junior	Syracuse, NY	Marquette
Cole Swider	21	F	6'9"	220	Senior	Portsmouth, RI	Villanova

=== 2021 recruiting class ===
College recruiting information
Name	Hometown	School	Height	Weight	Commit date
Benny Williams #8 SF / PF	Bowie, MD	IMG Academy	6 ft 8 in (2.03 m)	185 lb (84 kg)	Jun 4, 2020
Benny Williams #8 SF / PF	Recruit ratings: Scout: Rivals: 247Sports: ESPN: (89)				
Overall recruit ranking:
Note: In many cases, Scout, Rivals, 247Sports, On3, and ESPN may conflict in their listings of height and weight.; In these cases, the average was taken. ESPN grades are on a 100-point scale.; Sources: "2021 Syracuse Signees". Rivals.; "2021 Syracuse Signees". Scout.; "2021 Syracuse Signees". ESPN.; "Scout.com Team Recruiting Rankings". Scout.; "2021 Team Ranking". Rivals.

=== 2022 Recruiting class ===
College recruiting information (2022)
Name	Hometown	School	Height	Weight	Commit date
Justin Taylor #28 SF	Charlottesville, VA	IMG Academy	6 ft 6 in (1.98 m)	210 lb (95 kg)	Jun 26, 2021
Justin Taylor #28 SF	Recruit ratings: Scout: Rivals: 247Sports: ESPN: (82)				
Quadir Copeland #20 PG	Gettysburg, PA	Life Center Academy	6 ft 5 in (1.96 m)	175 lb (79 kg)	Aug 10, 2021
Quadir Copeland #20 PG	Recruit ratings: Scout: Rivals: 247Sports: ESPN: (82)				
Overall recruit ranking:
Note: In many cases, Scout, Rivals, 247Sports, On3, and ESPN may conflict in their listings of height and weight.; In these cases, the average was taken. ESPN grades are on a 100-point scale.; Sources: "2022 Syracuse Signees". Rivals.; "2022 Syracuse Signees". Scout.; "2022 Syracuse Signees". ESPN.; "Scout.com Team Recruiting Rankings". Scout.; "2022 Team Ranking". Rivals.

== Roster ==
2021–22 Syracuse Orange men's basketball team
Players
Coaches

Pos.	#	Name	Height	Weight	Year	Previous school	Hometown
F	0	Jimmy Boeheim	6 ft 8 in (2.03 m)	225 lb (102 kg)	GS	Brewster Academy	Fayetteville, New York
G	1	Paddy Casey (W)	6 ft 0 in (1.83 m)	200 lb (91 kg)	GS	Scranton Prep; USciences	Scranton, Pennsylvania
C	2	John Bol Ajak	6 ft 10 in (2.08 m)	216 lb (98 kg)	RS So	Westtown School	Natinga, South Sudan
C	5	Frank Anselem	6 ft 10 in (2.08 m)	215 lb (98 kg)	So	Westlake	Lagos, Nigeria
G	9	Pharrell Osei	6 ft 6 in (1.98 m)	200 lb (91 kg)	Jr	Queensmead School	London, United Kingdom
G	11	Joseph Girard III	6 ft 1 in (1.85 m)	190 lb (86 kg)	Jr	Glens Falls	Glens Falls, New York
F	12	Chaz Owens	6 ft 5 in (1.96 m)	205 lb (93 kg)	So	Shipley	Blue Bell, Pennsylvania
F	13	Benny Williams	6 ft 8 in (2.03 m)	208 lb (94 kg)	Fr	IMG Academy	Bowie, Maryland
C	14	Jesse Edwards	6 ft 11 in (2.11 m)	230 lb (104 kg)	Jr	IMG Academy	Amsterdam, Netherlands
F	21	Cole Swider	6 ft 9 in (2.06 m)	220 lb (100 kg)	Sr	St. Andrews School; Villanova	Portsmouth, Rhode Island
G	23	Niko Ruffin (W)	5 ft 10 in (1.78 m)	170 lb (77 kg)	Fr	Paramus Catholic	Cresskill, New Jersey
G	24	Chris Lavalle (W)	5 ft 11 in (1.8 m)	168 lb (76 kg)	GS	West Genesee	Syracuse, New York
G	25	Shane Feldman (W)	6 ft 2 in (1.88 m)	165 lb (75 kg)	RS So	Agoura	Agoura Hills, California
F	32	Nick Giancola (W)	6 ft 5 in (1.96 m)	213 lb (97 kg)	GS	Lexington Catholic	Lexington, Kentucky
G	33	Arthur Cordes	6 ft 3 in (1.91 m)	180 lb (82 kg)	So	Sheehan	Wallingford, Connecticut
C	34	Bourama Sidibe	6 ft 10 in (2.08 m)	220 lb (100 kg)	GS	St. Benedict's Prep	Bamako, Mali
G	35	Buddy Boeheim	6 ft 6 in (1.98 m)	205 lb (93 kg)	Sr	Brewster Academy	Fayetteville, New York

Head coach

- Jim Boeheim, 46th yr. (Syracuse, 1966)

Assistant coach(es)

- Adrian Autry, 11th yr. (Syracuse, 1994)
- Gerry McNamara, 13th yr. (Syracuse, 2007)
- Allen Griffin, 5th yr. (Syracuse, 2001)

Legend

- (C) Team captain
- (S) Suspended
- (I) Ineligible
- (W) Walk-on
- Injured
- Current redshirt

Roster

== Schedule and results ==
Date time, TV	Rank^{#}	Opponent^{#}	Result	Record	High points	High rebounds	High assists	Site (attendance) city, state
Exhibition
October 27, 2021*; 7:00 p.m., ACCNX		Pace	W 79–60	–	21 – Swider	9 – Williams	6 – Girard III	Carrier Dome (3,372); Syracuse, NY
November 1, 2021*; 7:00 p.m., ACCNX		Le Moyne	W 90–50	–	20 – Girard III	6 – Edwards	9 – Girard III	Carrier Dome (4,551); Syracuse, NY
Regular Season
November 9, 2021*; 7:00 p.m., ACCRSN		Lafayette	W 97–63	1–0	20 – Girard III	12 – Swider	7 – Girard III	Carrier Dome (19,929); Syracuse, NY
November 14, 2021*; 5:00 p.m., ESPN2		Drexel	W 75–60	2–0	23 – B. Boeheim	6 – Anselem	5 – Girard III	Carrier Dome (20,841); Syracuse, NY
November 20, 2021*; 5:00 p.m., ACCNX		Colgate	L 85–100	2–1	27 – Girard III	10 – J. Boeheim	8 – Girard III	Carrier Dome (15,604); Syracuse, NY
November 24, 2021*; 5:00 p.m., ESPN2		vs. VCU; Battle 4 Atlantis Quarterfinals	L 55–67	2–2	20 – B. Boeheim	12 – J. Boeheim	2 – 3 tied	Imperial Arena (1,281); Nassau, Bahamas
November 25, 2021*; 7:30 p.m., ESPN2		vs. Arizona State; Battle 4 Atlantis consolation round	W 92–84	3–2	23 – B. Boeheim	11 – Swider	5 – Tied	Imperial Arena (1,299); Nassau, Bahamas
November 26, 2021*; 4:30 p.m., ESPN2		vs. No. 19 Auburn; Battle 4 Atlantis 5th place game	L 68–89	3–3	17 – 3 tied	6 – Edwards	5 – Torrence	Imperial Arena (1,136); Nassau, Bahamas
November 30, 2021*; 7:00 p.m., ESPN2		Indiana; ACC–Big Ten Challenge	W 112–110 ^{2OT}	4–3	27 – B. Boeheim	5 – Tied	8 – B. Boeheim	Carrier Dome (21,330); Syracuse, NY
December 4, 2021; 4:00 p.m., ACCN		at Florida State	W 63–60	5–3 (1–0)	16 – Tied	12 – Edwards	5 – Tied	Donald L. Tucker Civic Center (9,808); Tallahassee, Florida
December 7, 2021*; 9:30 p.m., ESPN		vs. No. 6 Villanova; Jimmy V Classic	L 53–67	5–4	21 – J. Boeheim	12 – Swider	3 – Girard III	Madison Square Garden (14,344); New York, NY
December 11, 2021*; 12:00 p.m., FOX		at Georgetown; Rivalry	L 75–79	5–5	17 – B. Boeheim	8 – Edwards	7 – Girard III	Capital One Arena (13,598); Washington, D.C.
December 18, 2021*; 6:00 p.m., ACCN		Lehigh	Canceled due to COVID-19 issues					Carrier Dome; Syracuse, NY
December 27, 2021*; 6:00 p.m., ACCN		Brown	W 93–62	6–5	28 – B. Boeheim	8 – J. Boeheim	7 – Tied	Carrier Dome (15,526); Syracuse, NY
December 29, 2021*; 7:00 p.m., ACCNX		Cornell	W 80–68	7–5	22 – B. Boeheim	8 – Edwards	5 – Girard III	Carrier Dome (15,579); Syracuse, NY
January 1, 2022; 8:00 p.m., ACCN		Virginia	L 69–74	7–6 (1–1)	27 – B. Boeheim	9 – J. Boeheim	5 – B. Boeheim	Carrier Dome (17,295); Syracuse, NY
January 5, 2022; 8:00 p.m., ACCN		at Miami (FL)	L 87–88	7–7 (1–2)	26 – Girard III	8 – Tied	5 – B. Boeheim	Watsco Center (4,506); Coral Gables, FL
January 8, 2022; 2:00 p.m., ACCRSN		at Wake Forest	L 74–77 ^{OT}	7–8 (1–3)	21 – J. Boeheim	14 – Swider	7 – Girard III	LJVM Coliseum (7,220); Winston-Salem, NC
January 11, 2022; 7:00 p.m., ESPNU		Pittsburgh	W 77–61	8–8 (2–3)	24 – B. Boeheim	8 – Edwards	3 – 3 tied	Carrier Dome (15,214); Syracuse, NY
January 15, 2021; 3:00 p.m., ESPN		Florida State	L 71–76	8–9 (2–4)	18 – B. Boeheim	7 – Swider	4 – Torrence	Carrier Dome (17,287); Syracuse, NY
January 18, 2022; 9:00 p.m., ACCN		Clemson	W 91–78	9–9 (3–4)	25 – B. Boeheim	11 – Edwards	9 – Girard III	Carrier Dome (15,210); Syracuse, NY
January 22, 2022; 12:00 p.m., ESPN		at No. 6 Duke	L 59–79	9–10 (3–5)	12 – Tied	9 – Edwards	6 – Torrence	Cameron Indoor Stadium (9,314); Durham, NC
January 25, 2022; 8:00 p.m., ACCN		at Pittsburgh	L 53–64	9–11 (3–6)	25 – B. Boeheim	9 – Edwards	4 – Girard III	Petersen Events Center (8,066); Pittsburgh, PA
January 29, 2022; 8:00 p.m., ACCN		Wake Forest	W 94–72	10–11 (4–6)	30 – B. Boeheim	6 – Anselem	7 – B. Boeheim	Carrier Dome (23,194); Syracuse, NY
February 2, 2022; 9:00 p.m., ESPN2		at NC State	W 89–82	11–11 (5–6)	19 – Tied	8 – Swider	8 – Girard III	PNC Arena (12,634); Raleigh, NC
February 5, 2022; 2:00 p.m., ESPN2		Louisville	W 92–69	12–11 (6–6)	19 – Tied	8 – Edwards	5 – Tied	Carrier Dome (23,298); Syracuse, NY
February 8, 2022; 8:00 p.m., ACCN		at Boston College	W 73–64	13–11 (7–6)	21 – Swider	8 – Swider	4 – Girard III	Conte Forum (5,666); Chestnut Hill, MA
February 12, 2022; 6:00 p.m., ESPN2		at Virginia Tech	L 59–71	13–12 (7–7)	21 – B. Boeheim	15 – Anselem	3 – Tied	Cassell Coliseum (8,925); Blacksburg, VA
February 19, 2022; 12:00 p.m., ESPNU		Boston College	W 76–56	14–12 (8–7)	18 – Tied	10 – J. Boeheim	5 – Torrence	Carrier Dome (23,019); Syracuse, NY
February 21, 2022; 7:00 p.m., ACCRSN		Georgia Tech; Rescheduled from December 29	W 74–73 ^{OT}	15–12 (9–7)	20 – J. Boeheim	12 – Swider	5 – Girard III	Carrier Dome (22,042); Syracuse, NY
February 23, 2022; 7:00 p.m., ESPNews		at Notre Dame	L 69–79	15–13 (9–8)	27 – J. Boeheim	8 – Anselem	4 – Girard III	Edmund P. Joyce Center (7,838); South Bend, IN
February 26, 2022; 6:00 p.m., ESPN		No. 7 Duke	L 72–97	15–14 (9–9)	23 – B. Boeheim	6 – Williams	3 – Tied	Carrier Dome (31,803); Syracuse, NY
February 28, 2022; 7:00 p.m., ESPN		at North Carolina	L 79–88 ^{OT}	15–15 (9–10)	36 – Swider	7 – Tied	4 – Girard III	Dean Smith Center (21,750); Chapel Hill, NC
March 5, 2022; 1:00 p.m., ESPNU		Miami (FL)	L 72–75	15–16 (9–11)	30 – B. Boeheim	9 – J. Boeheim	6 – Girard III	Carrier Dome (23,108); Syracuse, NY
ACC tournament
March 9, 2022; 12:00 p.m., ESPN	(9)	vs. (8) Florida State; Second round	W 96–57	16–16	28 – Swider	15 – Anselem	9 – Torrence	Barclays Center; Brooklyn, NY
March 10, 2022; 12:00 p.m., ESPN	(9)	vs. (1) No. 7 Duke; Quarterfinals	L 79–88	16–17	28 – J. Boeheim	7 – J. Boeheim	11 – Torrence	Barclays Center; Brooklyn, NY
*Non-conference game. ^{#}Rankings from AP Poll. (#) Tournament seedings in parentheses. All times are in Eastern Time.

== Rankings ==
Ranking movements Legend: ██ Increase in ranking ██ Decrease in ranking — = Not ranked RV = Received votes
	Week																			
Poll	Pre	1	2	3	4	5	6	7	8	9	10	11	12	13	14	15	16	17	18	Final
AP	RV	RV	—	—	—	—	—	—	—	—	—	—	—	—	—	—	—	—	—	Not released
Coaches	RV	RV^	—	—	—	—	—	—	—	—	—	—	—	—	—	—	—	—	—	—

*AP does not release post-NCAA Tournament rankings
^Coaches did not release a Week 2 poll.
