= 2021–22 Alabama Crimson Tide men's basketball team =

2021–22 Alabama Crimson Tide men's basketball

NCAA tournament, First Round
- Conference: Southeastern Conference
- Record: 19–14 (9–9 SEC)
- Head coach: Nate Oats (3rd season)
- Assistant coaches: Charlie Henry (3rd season); Bryan Hodgson (3rd season); Antoine Pettway (10th season)
- Home arena: Coleman Coliseum

2021–22 Southeastern Conference men's basketball standings
	Conf.				Overall
Team	W		L	PCT	W		L	PCT
No. 14 Auburn	15	–	3	.833	28	–	6	.824
No. 16 Kentucky	14	–	4	.778	26	–	8	.765
No. 15 Tennessee †	14	–	4	.778	27	–	8	.771
No. 8 Arkansas	13	–	5	.722	28	–	9	.757
LSU	9	–	9	.500	22	–	12	.647
Alabama	9	–	9	.500	19	–	14	.576
South Carolina	9	–	9	.500	18	–	13	.581
Texas A&M	9	–	9	.500	27	–	13	.675
Florida	9	–	9	.500	20	–	14	.588
Mississippi State	8	–	10	.444	18	–	16	.529
Vanderbilt	7	–	11	.389	19	–	17	.528
Missouri	5	–	13	.278	12	–	21	.364
Ole Miss	4	–	14	.222	13	–	19	.406
Georgia	1	–	17	.056	6	–	26	.188
† 2022 SEC tournament winner Rankings from AP poll

The 2021–22 Alabama Crimson Tide men's basketball team represented the University of Alabama in the 2021–22 NCAA Division I men's basketball season. The team is led by third-year head coach Nate Oats. They played their home games at Coleman Coliseum in Tuscaloosa, Alabama as a member of the Southeastern Conference. They finished the season 19–14, 9–9 in SEC Play to finish a five-way tie for 5th place. They lost in the Second Round of the SEC tournament to Vanderbilt. They received an at-large bid to the NCAA tournament as the No. 6 seed in the West Region, where they were upset in the First Round by Notre Dame.

== Previous season ==
The Crimson Tide finished the 2019–20 season 26–7, 16–2 in SEC play to win the regular season Southeastern Conference Championship, marking the team's first championship since 2002. They also won the SEC tournament, their first win in that competition since 1991 and the first time since 1987 that the program won both the regular season and tournament.

The Tide were placed as a No. 2 seed in the East Region for the 2021 NCAA tournament, their highest placement since 2002. They would defeat Iona and Maryland before falling to a surging 11-seed UCLA in the Sweet Sixteen in overtime, 88–78 (that UCLA team made the Final Four). Alabama was ranked No. 5 in the final Coaches' Poll following the season, and Oats was named SEC Coach of the Year as well as being a finalist for National Coach of the Year honors.

== Offseason ==
=== Departures ===
Name	Number	Pos.	Height	Weight	Year	Hometown	Reason for departure
Herbert Jones	1	G/F	6'8"	210	Senior	Greensboro, AL	Graduated/2021 NBA draft
Jordan Bruner	2	F	6'10"	225	GS Senior	Columbia, SC	Graduated
Alex Reese	3	F	6'9"	230	Senior	Pelham, AL	Graduated
Joshua Primo	11	G	6'6"	190	Freshman	Toronto, ON	Declare for 2021 NBA draft
John Petty Jr.	23	G	6'5"	184	Senior	Huntsville, AL	Graduated
Kendall Wall	30	F	6'5"	192	GS Senior	Columbia, SC	Walk-on; graduate transferred

=== Incoming transfers ===
Name	Number	Pos.	Height	Weight	Year	Hometown	Previous School
Noah Gurley	0	F	6'8"	210	Graduate Student	Fayetteviller, GA	Furman
Nimari Burnett	25	G	6'4"	190	Sophomore	Chicago, IL	Texas Tech

=== 2021 recruiting class ===
College recruiting information
Name	Hometown	School	Height	Weight	Commit date
JD Davison; PG	Letohatchee, Alabama	Calhoun School	6 ft 3 in (1.91 m)	195 lb (88 kg)	Oct 3, 2020
JD Davison; PG	Recruit ratings: Rivals: 247Sports: ESPN: (94)				
Charles Bediako; C	Brampton, Ontario	IMG Academy	7 ft 0 in (2.13 m)	225 lb (102 kg)	Jun 1, 2021
Charles Bediako; C	Recruit ratings: Rivals: 247Sports: ESPN: (88)				
Jusaun Holt; SG	Tacoma, Washington	St Francis Day School	6 ft 6 in (1.98 m)	190 lb (86 kg)	Sep 27, 2020
Jusaun Holt; SG	Recruit ratings: Rivals: 247Sports: ESPN: (82)				
Overall recruit ranking:
Note: In many cases, Scout, Rivals, 247Sports, On3, and ESPN may conflict in their listings of height and weight.; In these cases, the average was taken. ESPN grades are on a 100-point scale.; Sources: "2021 Alabama Commits". Rivals.; "ESPN- Alabama Crimson Tide Men's Basketball Recruiting". ESPN.; "2021 Team Ranking". Rivals.

=== 2022 Recruiting class ===
College recruiting information (2022)
Name	Hometown	School	Height	Weight	Commit date
Jaden Bradley #1 PG	Rochester, NY	IMG Academy	6 ft 2 in (1.88 m)	195 lb (88 kg)	Sep 30, 2021
Jaden Bradley #1 PG	Recruit ratings: Rivals: 247Sports: ESPN: (93)				
Overall recruit ranking:
Note: In many cases, Scout, Rivals, 247Sports, On3, and ESPN may conflict in their listings of height and weight.; In these cases, the average was taken. ESPN grades are on a 100-point scale.; Sources: "2022 Alabama Commits". Rivals.; "ESPN- Alabama Crimson Tide Men's Basketball Recruiting". ESPN.; "2022 Team Ranking". Rivals.

== Roster ==
2021–22 Alabama Crimson Tide men's basketball team
Players
Coaches

Pos.	#	Name	Height	Weight	Year	Previous school	Hometown
F	0	Noah Gurley	6 ft 8 in (2.03 m)	215 lb (98 kg)	GS	Furman	Fayetteville, GA
G	1	Jusaun Holt	6 ft 6 in (1.98 m)	190 lb (86 kg)	Fr	St. Francis HS	Tacoma, WA
F	2	Darius Miles	6 ft 8 in (2.03 m)	185 lb (84 kg)	So	Theodore Roosevelt HS	Washington, D.C.
G	3	JD Davison	6 ft 3 in (1.91 m)	195 lb (88 kg)	Fr	Calhoun HS	Letohatchee, AL
F	4	Juwan Gary	6 ft 6 in (1.98 m)	218 lb (99 kg)	RS So	West Charlotte HS	Columbia, SC
G	5	Jaden Shackelford	6 ft 3 in (1.91 m)	200 lb (91 kg)	Jr	Hesperia HS	Hesperia, CA
C	10	Charles Bediako	7 ft 0 in (2.13 m)	225 lb (102 kg)	Fr	IMG Academy	Brampton, ON
G	12	Delaney Heard (W)	6 ft 3 in (1.91 m)	198 lb (90 kg)	So	Oak Hill Academy	Canton, GA
G	13	Jahvon Quinerly	6 ft 1 in (1.85 m)	175 lb (79 kg)	RS Jr	Villanova	Hackensack, NJ
G	14	Keon Ellis	6 ft 6 in (1.98 m)	175 lb (79 kg)	Sr	Florida SouthWestern State	Eustis, FL
F	15	Tyler Barnes (W)	6 ft 8 in (2.03 m)	210 lb (95 kg)	GS	St. Xavier HS	Louisville, KY
G	21	Britton Johnson (W)	6 ft 4 in (1.93 m)	185 lb (84 kg)	Sr	Mountain Brook HS	Mountain Brook, AL
F	22	Keon Ambrose-Hylton	6 ft 8 in (2.03 m)	215 lb (98 kg)	So	Andrews Osborne Academy	Toronto, ON
G	24	Jaden Quinerly (W)	6 ft 0 in (1.83 m)	155 lb (70 kg)	So	Ramsey HS	Hackensack, NJ
G	25	Nimari Burnett (injured) (redshirt)	6 ft 4 in (1.93 m)	190 lb (86 kg)	So	Texas Tech	Chicago, IL
G	30	Adam Cottrell (W)	6 ft 3 in (1.91 m)	200 lb (91 kg)	Jr	Lakeview Academy	Flowery Branch, GA
F	33	James Rojas	6 ft 8 in (2.03 m)	220 lb (100 kg)	RS Sr	Hutchinson CC	Jamestown, NY
F	35	Alex Tchikou	6 ft 11 in (2.11 m)	230 lb (104 kg)	RS Fr	Dream City Christian HS	Paris, France

Head coach

- Nate Oats (Maranatha Baptist)

Assistant coach(es)

- Charlie Henry (Madonna)
- Bryan Hodgson (Fredonia State)
- Antoine Pettway (Alabama)

Legend

- (C) Team captain
- (S) Suspended
- (I) Ineligible
- (W) Walk-on
- Injured
- Current redshirt

Roster

== Schedule and results ==
Date time, TV	Rank^{#}	Opponent^{#}	Result	Record	High points	High rebounds	High assists	Site (attendance) city, state
Exhibition
October 24, 2021*; 2:00 pm	No. 14	Louisiana; Charity exhibition	W 73–68	–	21 – Ellis	7 – Tied	3 – Tied	Coleman Coliseum (2,157); Tuscaloosa, AL
regular season
November 9, 2021*; 8:00 p.m., SECN	No. 14	Louisiana Tech	W 93–64	1–0	18 – Ellis	10 – Gary	6 – Davison	Coleman Coliseum (12,613); Tuscaloosa, AL
November 12, 2021*; 7:00 p.m., SECN+	No. 14	South Dakota State	W 104–88	2–0	26 – Quinerly	13 – Ellis	8 – Quinerly	Coleman Coliseum (10,546); Tuscaloosa, AL
November 16, 2021*; 6:30 p.m., SECN+	No. 14	South Alabama	W 73–68	3–0	18 – Tied	10 – Shackelford	5 – Quinerly	Coleman Coliseum (9,038); Tuscaloosa, AL
November 19, 2021*; 7:00 p.m., SECN+	No. 14	Oakland	W 86–59	4–0	20 – Shackelford	7 – Tied	5 – Davison	Coleman Coliseum (10,330); Tuscaloosa, AL
November 25, 2021*; 3:00 p.m., ESPN2	No. 10т	vs. Iona; ESPN Events Invitational quarterfinals	L 68–72	4–1	19 – Shackelford	10 – Shackelford	3 – Davison	HP Field House; Kissimmee, FL
November 26, 2021*; 3:30 p.m., ESPNU	No. 10т	vs. Drake; ESPN Events Invitational consolation round	W 80–71	5–1	18 – Quinerly	10 – Gary	4 – Tied	HP Field House (3,020); Kissimmee, FL
November 28, 2021*; 5:30 p.m., ESPNU	No. 10т	vs. Miami (FL); ESPN Events Invitational	W 96–64	6–1	22 – Ellis	8 – Bediako	10 – Davison	HP Field House (3,127); Kissimmee, FL
December 4, 2021*; 7:00 p.m., ESPN2	No. 16	vs. No. 3 Gonzaga; Battle in Seattle	W 91–82	7–1	28 – Shackelford	9 – Shackelford	6 – Quinerly	Climate Pledge Arena (18,048); Seattle, WA
December 11, 2021*; 9:00 p.m., ESPN2	No. 9	No. 14 Houston	W 83–82	8–1	19 – Gary	9 – Davison	8 – Quinerly	Coleman Coliseum (10,613); Tuscaloosa, AL
December 14, 2021*; 8:00 p.m., ESPN2	No. 6	at Memphis	L 78–92	8–2	19 – Ellis	8 – Shackelford	10 – Davison	FedExForum (15,266); Memphis, TN
December 18, 2021*; 7:30 p.m., SECN	No. 6	Jacksonville State	W 65–59	9–2	20 – Ellis	10 – Ellis	4 – Quinerly	Coleman Coliseum (10,064); Tuscaloosa, AL
December 21, 2021*; 6:00 p.m., SECN+	No. 10	vs. Davidson; C. M. Newton Classic	L 78–79	9–3	20 – Shackelford	8 – Gary	6 – Quinerly	Legacy Arena (9,781); Birmingham, AL
December 29, 2021; 8:00 p.m., ESPN2	No. 19	No. 14 Tennessee	W 73–68	10–3 (1–0)	20 – Gurley	10 – Gurley	5 – Ellis	Coleman Coliseum (10,427); Tuscaloosa, AL
January 5, 2022; 6:00 p.m., ESPN2	No. 15	at Florida	W 83–70	11–3 (2–0)	19 – Tied	8 – Gary	5 – Quinerly	O'Connell Center (10,210); Gainesville, FL
January 8, 2022; 2:30 p.m., SECN	No. 15	at Missouri	L 86–92	11–4 (2–1)	19 – Quinerly	7 – Davison	4 – Tied	Mizzou Arena (10,903); Columbia, MO
January 11, 2022; 8:00 p.m., ESPN	No. 24	No. 4 Auburn; Iron Bowl of Basketball	L 77–81	11–5 (2–2)	14 – Quinerly	9 – Miles	5 – Quinerly	Coleman Coliseum (13,474); Tuscaloosa, AL
January 15, 2022; 5:00 p.m., SECN	No. 24	at Mississippi State	L 76–78	11–6 (2–3)	17 – Shackelford	7 – Ellis	3 – Ellis	Humphrey Coliseum (8,090); Starkville, MS
January 19, 2022; 6:00 p.m., ESPN2		No. 13 LSU	W 70–67	12–6 (3–3)	26 – Shackelford	8 – Ellis	2 – Shackelford	Coleman Coliseum (10,368); Tuscaloosa, AL
January 22, 2022; 5:00 p.m., SECN		Missouri	W 86–76	13–6 (4–3)	21 – Shackelford	7 – Shackelford	9 – Quinerly	Coleman Coliseum (10,799); Tuscaloosa, AL
January 25, 2022; 5:30 p.m., SECN		at Georgia	L 76–82	13–7 (4–4)	20 – Shackelford	9 – Ellis	7 – Davison	Stegeman Coliseum (6,703); Athens, GA
January 29, 2022*; 3:00 p.m., ESPN		No. 4 Baylor; Big 12/SEC Challenge	W 87–78	14–7 (4–4)	20 – Quinerly	9 – Shackelford	5 – Tied	Coleman Coliseum (14,474); Tuscaloosa, AL
February 1, 2022; 8:00 p.m., ESPN		at No. 1 Auburn; Iron Bowl of Basketball	L 81–100	14–8 (4–5)	26 – Shackelford	8 – Ellis	4 – Tied	Auburn Arena (9,121); Auburn, AL
February 5, 2022; 7:00 p.m., ESPN		No. 5 Kentucky	L 55–66	14–9 (4–6)	12 – Bediako	8 – Bediako	4 – Quinerly	Coleman Coliseum (12,477); Tuscaloosa, AL
February 9, 2022; 7:30 p.m., SECN		at Ole Miss	W 97–83	15–9 (5–6)	30 – Shackelford	8 – Gurley	8 – Tied	SJB Pavilion (6,454); Oxford, MS
February 12, 2022; 11:00 a.m., SECN		Arkansas	W 68–67	16–9 (6–6)	11 – Davison	7 – Miles	4 – Tied	Coleman Coliseum (10,353); Tuscaloosa, AL
February 16, 2022; 6:00 p.m., ESPN2	No. 25	Mississippi State	W 80–75	17–9 (7–6)	21 – Quinerly	10 – Davison	8 – Quinerly	Coleman Coliseum (9,192); Tuscaloosa, AL
February 19, 2022; 12:00 p.m., CBS	No. 25	at No. 4 Kentucky	L 81–90	17–10 (7–7)	28 – Ellis	7 – Davison	5 – Davison	Rupp Arena (20,374); Lexington, KY
February 22, 2022; 8:00 p.m., SECN	No. 24	at Vanderbilt	W 74–72	18–10 (8–7)	19 – Quinerly	10 – Davison	5 – Davison	Memorial Gymnasium (7,041); Nashville, TN
February 26, 2022; 5:00 p.m., SECN	No. 24	South Carolina	W 90–71	19–10 (9–7)	21 – Shackelford	7 – Ellis	5 – Quinerly	Coleman Coliseum (11,195); Tuscaloosa, AL
March 2, 2022; 6:00 p.m., SECN	No. 25	Texas A&M	L 71–87	19–11 (9–8)	16 – Shackleford	5 – Bediako	6 – Davison	Coleman Coliseum (9,281); Tuscaloosa, AL
March 5, 2022; 11:00 a.m., CBS	No. 25	at LSU	L 77–80 ^{OT}	19–12 (9–9)	19 – Ellis	9 – Ellis	4 – Davison	Pete Maravich Assembly Center (11,237); Baton Rouge, LA
SEC Tournament
March 10, 2022; 7:00 p.m., SECN	(6)	vs. (11) Vanderbilt; Second Round	L 76–82	19–13	21 – Shackelford	7 – Tied	8 – Davison	Amalie Arena (12,121); Tampa, FL
NCAA tournament
March 18, 2022*; 3:15 p.m., TNT	(6 W)	vs. (11 W) Notre Dame; First Round	L 64–78	19–14	16 – Ellis	9 – Ellis	9 – Davison	Viejas Arena (11,328); San Diego, CA
*Non-conference game. ^{#}Rankings from AP Poll. (#) Tournament seedings in parentheses. W=West. All times are in Central Time.

== Rankings ==
Ranking movements Legend: ██ Increase in ranking ██ Decrease in ranking RV = Received votes т = Tied with team above or below
	Week																				
Poll	Pre	1	2	3	4	5	6	7	8	9	10	11	12	13	14	15	16	17	18	19	Final
AP	14	14	10т	16	9	6	10	19	15	24	RV	RV	RV	25	24	25					Not released
Coaches	13	13^	9	16	9	8	11	19	20	25	RV	RV	RV	RV	25	24					

*AP does not release post-NCAA Tournament rankings ^Coaches did not release a Week 1 poll.

== See also ==
- 2021–22 Alabama Crimson Tide women's basketball team
