= Matt Cross (basketball) =

American basketball player (born 2001)

No. 3 – Texas Legends
- Position: Small forward
- League: NBA G League

Personal information
- Born: February 21, 2001 (age 25) Beverly, Massachusetts, U.S.
- Listed height: 6 ft 7 in (2.01 m)
- Listed weight: 225 lb (102 kg)

Career information
- High school: Brewster Academy (Wolfeboro, New Hampshire)
- College: Miami (Florida) (2020-2021); Louisville (2021-2022); UMass (2022-2024); SMU (2024-2025)
- NBA draft: 2025: undrafted
- Playing career: 2025–present

Career history
- 2025–present: Texas Legends

Career highlights
- First-team All-Atlantic 10 (2024)
- Stats at NBA.com
- Stats at Basketball Reference

Matthew Jacob Cross (born February 21, 2001) is an American professional basketball player for the Texas Legends of the NBA G League. He played college basketball for the Miami Hurricanes, Louisville Cardinals, UMass Minutemen, and SMU Mustangs.

== College career ==
As a freshman in 2020-21 with the Miami Hurricanes, Cross appeared in the first 14 games and started in 9 of them, averaging 6.9 points, 3.5 rebounds, and 1.4 assists per game.

After his freshman year at Miami, Cross transferred to Louisville, where he appeared in 28 games with 9 starts and averaged 5.8 points, 3.9 rebounds, and 0.5 assists per game.

Cross transferred to UMass for his junior season, appearing in 25 games and starting in 23 games and averaging 12.2 points, 6.3 rebounds, and 1.8 assists per game. In his senior year, Cross had his best statistical season of his collegiate career, averaging 15.3 points, 8.3 rebounds, and 3.0 assists per game, all career-highs.

After two years playing for the UMass Minutemen, Cross transferred to SMU. With the Mustangs in his fifth college season, Cross averaged 11.8 points, 7.6 rebound, and 1.7 assists per game.

== Professional career ==
Cross joined the Dallas Mavericks for the 2025 NBA Summer League after going undrafted in the 2025 NBA Draft.

On December 19, 2025, Cross made his NBA G-League debut for the Texas Legends in a game against the College Park Skyhawks.
