= 2021–22 Atlantic Coast Conference men's basketball season =

- League: NCAA Division I
- Sport: Basketball
- Duration: November 9, 2021 – March 5, 2022
- Teams: 15
- TV partner(s): ACC Network, ESPN, ACC RSN

NBA Draft
- Top draft pick: Paolo Banchero, Duke
- Picked by: Orlando Magic, First Overall

2021–22 NCAA Division I men's basketball season
- First place: Duke
- Runners-up: North Carolina
- Season MVP: Alondes Williams – Wake Forest

ACC tournament
- Champions: Virginia Tech
- Finals MVP: Hunter Cattoor – Virginia Tech

Atlantic Coast Conference men's basketball seasons
- ← 2020–21 2022–23 →

2021–22 ACC men's basketball standings
| | Conf. | | | | Overall |
| Team | W | | L | PCT | W | | L | PCT |
|---|---|---|---|---|---|---|---|---|
| No. 9 Duke | 16 | – | 4 | .800 | 32 | – | 7 | .821 |
| North Carolina | 15 | – | 5 | .750 | 29 | – | 10 | .744 |
| Notre Dame | 15 | – | 5 | .750 | 24 | – | 11 | .686 |
| Miami (FL) | 14 | – | 6 | .700 | 26 | – | 11 | .703 |
| Wake Forest | 13 | – | 7 | .650 | 25 | – | 10 | .714 |
| Virginia | 12 | – | 8 | .600 | 21 | – | 14 | .600 |
| Virginia Tech † | 11 | – | 9 | .550 | 23 | – | 13 | .639 |
| Florida State | 10 | – | 10 | .500 | 17 | – | 14 | .548 |
| Syracuse | 9 | – | 11 | .450 | 16 | – | 17 | .485 |
| Clemson | 8 | – | 12 | .400 | 17 | – | 16 | .515 |
| Louisville | 6 | – | 14 | .300 | 13 | – | 19 | .406 |
| Boston College | 6 | – | 14 | .300 | 13 | – | 20 | .394 |
| Pittsburgh | 6 | – | 14 | .300 | 11 | – | 21 | .344 |
| Georgia Tech | 5 | – | 15 | .250 | 12 | – | 20 | .375 |
| NC State | 4 | – | 16 | .200 | 11 | – | 21 | .344 |
† 2022 ACC tournament winner Rankings from AP poll

The 2021–22 Atlantic Coast Conference men's basketball season began with practices in October 2021, followed by the start of the 2021–22 NCAA Division I men's basketball season in November. Conference play began in December 2021 and concluded March 8–12, 2022, with the 2022 ACC men's basketball tournament at Barclays Center in Brooklyn, New York. This was the 68th season of Atlantic Coast Conference basketball.

== Head coaches ==
=== Coaching changes ===
- Roy Williams retired after serving as the head coach at North Carolina for 18 seasons. Hubert Davis was hired as the next head coach of North Carolina.
- Boston College fired Jim Christian in the middle of the season, after leading the team to a 3–13 record. Christian's overall record with Boston College was 78–132 and 26–94 in ACC play. Scott Spinelli served as interim coach until the end of the season. After the season Earl Grant was hired as the new head coach.

=== Coaches ===
| Team | Head coach | Previous job | Years at school | Record at school | ACC record | ACC titles | NCAA tournaments | NCAA Final Fours | NCAA Championships |
|---|---|---|---|---|---|---|---|---|---|
| Boston College | Earl Grant | Charleston | 1 | 0–0 | 0–0 | 0 | 0 | 0 | 0 |
| Clemson | Brad Brownell | Wright State | 12 | 201–149 | 95–99 | 0 | 3 | 0 | 0 |
| Duke | Mike Krzyzewski | Army | 42 | 1097–302 | 449–189 | 16 | 35 | 12 | 5 |
| Florida State | Leonard Hamilton | Washington Wizards | 20 | 399–228 | 176–146 | 1 | 11 | 0 | 0 |
| Georgia Tech | Josh Pastner | Memphis | 6 | 82–75 | 42–49 | 1 | 1 | 0 | 0 |
| Louisville | Chris Mack | Xavier | 4 | 57–28 | 33–18 | 0 | 1 | 0 | 0 |
| Miami | Jim Larrañaga | George Mason | 11 | 200–130 | 91–90 | 1 | 4 | 1 | 0 |
| NC State | Kevin Keatts | UNC Wilmington | 5 | 79–47 | 39–34 | 0 | 1 | 0 | 0 |
| North Carolina | Hubert Davis | North Carolina (Assistant) | 1 | 0–0 | 0–0 | 0 | 0 | 0 | 0 |
| Notre Dame | Mike Brey | Delaware | 22 | 448–248 | 207–159 | 1 | 12 | 0 | 0 |
| Pittsburgh | Jeff Capel | Duke (Assistant) | 4 | 40–48 | 15–38 | 0 | 0 | 0 | 0 |
| Syracuse | Jim Boeheim | Syracuse (Assistant) | 45 | 964–399 | 404–247 | 0 | 32 | 4 | 1 |
| Virginia | Tony Bennett | Washington State | 13 | 295–103 | 149–62 | 2 | 8 | 1 | 1 |
| Virginia Tech | Mike Young | Wofford | 3 | 31–23 | 16–17 | 0 | 1 | 0 | 0 |
| Wake Forest | Steve Forbes | East Tennessee State | 2 | 6–16 | 3–15 | 0 | 0 | 0 | 0 |

Notes:

- Year at school includes 2021–22 season.
- Overall and ACC records are from the time at current school and are through the end of the 2020–21 season.
- NCAA tournament appearances are from the time at current school only.
- NCAA Final Fours and championship include time at other schools

== Preseason ==
=== Recruiting classes ===
Rankings
| Team | ESPN | 247 Sports | Rivals | Commits |
|---|---|---|---|---|
| Boston College | | 92 | 82 | 2 |
| Clemson | | 47 | 64 | 3 |
| Duke | | 6 | 5 | 4 |
| Florida State | | 8 | 8 | 4 |
| Georgia Tech | | 28 | 33 | 3 |
| Louisville | | 17 | 19 | 3 |
| Miami | | 24 | 30 | 3 |
| NC State | | 25 | 45 | 3 |
| North Carolina | | 41 | 34 | 2 |
| Notre Dame | | 56 | 60 | 2 |
| Pittsburgh | | 105 | 82 (t) | 1 |
| Syracuse | | 72 | 54 | 1 |
| Virginia | | 80 | 77 | 2 |
| Virginia Tech | | 75 | 76 | 2 |
| Wake Forest | | 43 | 48 | 3 |

Notes:

- Rankings are up to date as of November 3, 2021
- NR stands for not ranked.

=== Preseason watchlists ===
| Wooden | Naismith | Cousy | West | Erving | Malone | Abdul-Jabbar | Olson |
| Keve Aluma – Virginia Tech; Armando Bacot – North Carolina; Paolo Banchero – Duke; Buddy Boeheim – Syracuse; Dawson Garcia – North Carolina; Mark Williams – Duke | Armando Bacot – North Carolina; Buddy Boeheim – Syracuse; Keve Aluma – Virginia Tech; Paolo Banchero – Duke | Jeremy Roach – Duke; Caleb Love – North Carolina; Kihei Clark – Virginia | Isaiah Wong – Miami; Buddy Boeheim – Syracuse | AJ Griffin – Duke; Matthew Cleveland – Florida State | Paolo Banchero – Duke; Dawson Garcia – North Carolina; Jayden Gardner – Virginia; Keve Aluma – Virginia Tech | Mark Williams – Duke; Armando Bacot – North Carolina | Keve Aluma – Virginia Tech; Armando Bacot – North Carolina; Paolo Banchero – Duke; Buddy Boeheim – Syracuse; Mark Williams – Duke |

=== Preseason polls ===
| | AP | Athlon; Sports | Bleacher; Report | Blue Ribbon; Yearbook | CBS Sports | Coaches | ESPN | KenPom | Sports; Illustrated |
| Boston College | | | | | 174 | | | 146 | |
| Clemson | | | | | 65 | | | 59 | |
| Duke | 9 | 6 | 4 | 8 | 15 | 9 | 11 | 10 | 3 |
| Florida State | 20 | 17 | 11 | 14 | 24 | 19 | 21 | 24 | 10 |
| Georgia Tech | | | | | 64 | | | 54 | |
| Louisville | RV | | | | 30 | | | 36 | |
| Miami | | | | | 70 | | | 83 | |
| North Carolina | 19 | 12 | 17 | 16 | 20 | 20 | 17 | 40 | |
| NC State | | | | | 69 | | | 56 | |
| Notre Dame | RV | | | | 50 | RV | | 27 | |
| Pittsburgh | | | | | 108 | | | 145 | |
| Syracuse | RV | | 25 | | 46 | RV | | 41 | |
| Virginia | 25 | | 21-T | | 27 | 25 | 25 | 45 | |
| Virginia Tech | RV | 23 | | | 44 | RV | | 39 | |
| Wake Forest | | | | | 113 | | | 104 | |

==== ACC Preseason Media poll ====
The Preseason Media Poll and Preseason All-ACC teams were voted on after a tipoff event held at the Charlotte Marriott City Center in Charlotte, North Carolina on October 12, 2021. Voting for the polls opened on October 13 and concluded on October 18. The polls and teams were announced on the ACC Network on October 19, 2021. Duke was selected the preseason favorite.

===== Preseason poll =====
1. Duke – 1,132 (47)
2. Florida State – 1,034 (14)
3. North Carolina – 1,001 (5)
4. Virginia – 949 (9)
5. Virginia Tech – 857 (5)
6. Louisville – 791 (1)
7. Syracuse – 781
8. Notre Dame – 599
9. NC State – 555
10. Georgia Tech – 524
11. Clemson – 430
12. Miami – 428
13. Wake Forest – 274
14. Pitt – 253
15. Boston College – 112

First-place votes shown in parentheses.

===== Preseason All-ACC teams =====
2021 ACC Men's Basketball Preseason All-ACC Teams
| First Team | Second Team |
| Buddy Boeheim – Syracuse; Keve Aluma – Virginia Tech; Paolo Banchero – Duke; Armando Bacot – North Carolina; Isaiah Wong – Miami | Michael Devoe – Georgia Tech; Kihei Clark – Virginia; Prentiss Hubb – Notre Dame; Mark Williams – Duke; Wendell Moore Jr. – Duke; Caleb Love – North Carolina; Malik Williams – Louisville |

===== ACC preseason player of the year =====
- Paolo Banchero – Duke (28)
- Keve Aluma – Virginia Tech (16)
- Buddy Boeheim – Syracuse (13)
- Armando Bacot – North Carolina (12)
- Kihei Clark – Virginia (5)
- Wendell Moore Jr. – Duke (3)
- Caleb Love – North Carolina(2)
- Mark Williams – Duke (2)

===== ACC Preseason Freshman of the year =====
- Paolo Banchero – Duke (64)
- Trevor Keels – Duke (5)
- Terquavion Smith – NC State (3)
- Dontrez Styles – North Carolina (3)
- Igor Miličić Jr. – Virginia (3)
- Wooga Poplar – Miami (1)
- Benny Williams – Syracuse (1)
- Cameron Hildreth – Wake Forest (1)

=== Early season tournaments ===
| Team | Tournament | Finish |
|---|---|---|
| Boston College | Sunshine Slam | 4th (Bracket B) |
| Clemson | Charleston Classic | 4th |
| Duke | Duke Veterans Day Weekend Showcase | Champions |
| Florida State | Jacksonville Classic | Champions |
| Georgia Tech | Jerry Colangelo Classic | 2nd |
| Louisville | Bahamas Championship | Champions |
| Miami | ESPN Events Invitational | 6th |
| North Carolina | Hall of Fame Tip Off | 4th |
| NC State | Hall of Fame Showcase | 2nd |
| Notre Dame | Maui Invitational | 6th |
| Pittsburgh | Gotham Classic | 2–1 |
| Syracuse | Battle 4 Atlantis | 6th |
| Virginia | Legends Classic | Champions |
| Virginia Tech | NIT Season Tip-Off | 4th |
| Wake Forest | Emerald Coast Classic | 2nd |

== Regular season ==
=== Rankings ===
Legend
| Increase in ranking |
| Decrease in ranking |
| Not ranked previous week |
| First Place votes shown in () |

| | | Pre | Wk 2 | Wk 3 | Wk 4 | Wk 5 | Wk 6 | Wk 7 | Wk 8 | Wk 9 | Wk 10 | Wk 11 | Wk 12 | Wk 13 | Wk 14 | Wk 15 | Wk 16 | Wk 17 | Wk 18 | Final |
|---|---|---|---|---|---|---|---|---|---|---|---|---|---|---|---|---|---|---|---|---|
| Boston College | AP | | | | | | | | | | | | | | | | | | | |
| Boston College | C | | | | | | | | | | | | | | | | | | | |
| Clemson | AP | | | | | | | | | | | | | | | | | | | |
| Clemson | C | | | | | | | | | | | | | | | | | | | |
| Duke | AP | 9 | 7 | 5 | 1 (51) | 3 | 2 | 2 | 2 | 2 | 8 | 6 | 9 | 9 | 7 | 9 | 7 | 4 (11) | 7 | 9 |
| Duke | C | 9 | 6 | 1 (19) | 3 | 2 | 2 | 2 | 2 | 8 | 5 | 7 | 6 | 6 | 5 | 6 | 2 (9) | 7 | 10 | 3 |
| Florida State | AP | 20 | RV | RV | | | | | | | | | RV | | | | | | | |
| Florida State | C | 19 | RV | RV | | | | | RV | | | RV | RV | | | | | | | |
| Georgia Tech | AP | | | | | | | | | | | | | | | | | | | |
| Georgia Tech | C | | | | | | | | | | | | | | | | | | | |
| Louisville | AP | RV | | | RV | | | | | | | | | | | | | | | |
| Louisville | C | | | | | | | | | | | | | | | | | | | |
| Miami | AP | | | | | | | | | | RV | RV | RV | RV | | RV | | | | |
| Miami | C | | | | | | | | | RV | RV | RV | RV | RV | RV | RV | RV | | | 16т |
| North Carolina | AP | 19 | 18 | RV | RV | RV | RV | RV | | | | RV | | | | | | | 25 | RV |
| North Carolina | C | 20 | RV | | RV | RV | | | | | RV | | | | RV | | RV | RV | RV | 2 |
| NC State | AP | | | | | | | | | | | | | | | | | | | |
| NC State | C | | | | | | | | | | | | | | | | | | | |
| Notre Dame | AP | RV | | | | | | | | | | | | RV | RV | RV | RV | RV | RV | |
| Notre Dame | C | RV | RV | | | | | | | | | | RV | RV | RV | RV | RV | RV | | RV |
| Pittsburgh | AP | | | | | | | | | | | | | | | | | | | |
| Pittsburgh | C | | | | | | | | | | | | | | | | | | | |
| Syracuse | AP | RV | RV | | | | | | | | | | | | | | | | | |
| Syracuse | C | RV | | | | | | | | | | | | | | | | | | |
| Virginia | AP | 25 | RV | | | | | | | | | | | | | RV | | | | |
| Virginia | C | 25 | | | | | | | | | | | | | | | | | | |
| Virginia Tech | AP | RV | RV | RV | RV | | | RV | | | | | | | | | | | | RV |
| Virginia Tech | C | RV | RV | | | | | | | | | | | | | | | | 24 | RV |
| Wake Forest | AP | | | | RV | | | RV | RV | | | | RV | | RV | RV | RV | | | |
| Wake Forest | C | | | | RV | | RV | RV | | | | RV | RV | 25 | RV | RV | RV | RV | RV | |

=== Conference matrix ===
This table summarizes the head-to-head results between teams in conference play. Each team will play 20 conference games, and at least 1 against each opponent. The full conference schedule was announced on September 16, 2021.

| | Boston College | Clemson | Duke | Florida State | Georgia Tech | Louisville | Miami | North Carolina | NC State | Notre Dame | Pittsburgh | Syracuse | Virginia | Virginia Tech | Wake Forest |
|---|---|---|---|---|---|---|---|---|---|---|---|---|---|---|---|
| vs. Boston College | – | 68–70; 70–60 | 72–61 | 55–71 | 81–76; 82–78 (OT) | 67–54 | 81–70 | 91–65; 58–47 | 61–69 | 57–73; 99–95 (OT) | 69–67; 56–69 | 73–64; 76–56 | 67–55 | 63–68 | 87–57 |
| vs. Clemson | 70–68; 60–70 | – | 71–69; 82–64 | 69–75; 81–80 | 69–64; 65–68 | 70–61 | 80–75 | 79–77 | 65–70 | 72–56; 76–61 | 48–75 | 91–78 | 50–67; 75–65 | 59–63 | 69–80 |
| vs. Duke | 61–72 | 69–71; 64–82 | – | 79–78 (OT); 70–88 | 57–69 | 65–74 | 76–74 | 67–87; 94–81 | 73–88 | 43–57 | 56–86 | 59–79; 72–92 | 69–68; 61–65 | 65–76 | 64–76; 74–76 |
| vs. Florida State | 71–55 | 75–69; 80–81 | 78–79 (OT); 88–70 | – | 75–61 | 70–79 | 64–65; 60–61 | 94–74 | 81–83; 76–89 | 70–74 | 56–51 | 63–60; 71–76 | 63–64 | 85–72 | 76–54; 68–60 |
| vs. Georgia Tech | 76–81; 78–82 (OT) | 64–69; 68–65 | 69–57 | 61–75 | – | 67–64 | 73–62; 79–70 | 79–62; 88–65 | 76–61 | 72–68 (OT); 90–56 | 62–68 | 74–73 (OT) | 63–53; 71–61 | 81–66; 62–58 | 80–64 |
| vs. Louisville | 54–67 | 61–70 | 74–65 | 79–70 | 64–67 | – | 70–63 | 90–83 (OT); 70–63 | 68–73; 79–63 | 82–70; 63–57 | 72–75; 65–53 | 92–69 | 64–52 | 75–43 | 69–73; 99–77 |
| vs. Miami | 70–81 | 75–80 | 74–76 | 65–64; 61–60 | 62–73; 70–79 | 63–70 | – | 57–85 | 83–91 | 68–64 | 64–85 | 87–88; 72–75 | 71–58; 74–71 | 75–78; 71–70 | 84–92; 72–76 |
| vs. North Carolina | 65–91; 47–58 | 77–79 | 87–67; 81–94 | 74–94 | 62–79; 65–88 | 83–90 (OT); 63–70 | 85–57 | – | 80–100; 74–84 | 78–73 | 76–67 | 79–88 (OT) | 58–74 | 68–78; 57–65 | 98–76 |
| vs. NC State | 69–61 | 70–65 | 88–73 | 83–81; 89–76 | 61–76 | 73–68; 63–79 | 91–83 | 100–80; 84–74 | – | 73–65; 69–57 | 71–69 | 89–82 | 63–77 | 63–68; 62–59 | 69–51; 101–76 |
| vs. Notre Dame | 73–57; 95–99 (OT) | 56–72; 61–76 | 57–43 | 74–70 | 68–72 (OT); 56–90 | 70–82; 57–63 | 64–68 | 73–78 | 65–73; 57–69 | – | 67–68; 54–78 | 69–79 | 65–69 | 79–73 | 79–74 |
| vs. Pittsburgh | 67–69; 69–56 | 75–48 | 86–56 | 51–56 | 68–62 | 75–72; 53–65 | 85–64 | 67–76 | 69–71 | 68–67; 78–54 | – | 77–61; 53–64 | 57–56; 66–61 | 76–71; 74–47 | 91–75 |
| vs. Syracuse | 64–73; 56–76 | 78–91 | 79–59; 97–72 | 60–63; 76–71 | 73–74 (OT) | 69–92 | 88–87; 75–72 | 88–79 (OT) | 82–89 | 79–69 | 61–77; 64–53 | – | 74–69 | 71–59 | 77–74 (OT); 72–94 |
| vs. Virginia | 55–67 | 67–50; 65–75 | 68–69; 65–61 | 64–63 | 53–63 | 52–64; 61–71 | 58–71; 71–74 | 74–58 | 77–63 | 69–65 | 56–57; 61–66 | 69–74 | – | 52–54; 62–53 | 63–55 |
| vs. Virginia Tech | 68–63 | 63–59 | 76–65 | 72–85 | 66–81; 58–62 | 43–75 | 78–75; 70–71 | 78–68; 65–57 | 68–63; 59–62 | 73–79 | 71–76; 47–74 | 59–71 | 54–52; 53–62 | – | 80–61 |
| vs. Wake Forest | 57–87 | 80–69 | 76–64; 76–74 | 54–76; 60–68 | 64–80 | 73–69; 77–99 | 92–84; 76–72 | 76–98 | 51–69; 76–101 | 74–79 | 75–91 | 74–77 (OT); 94–72 | 55–63 | 61–80 | – |
| Total | 6–14 | 8–12 | 16–4 | 10–10 | 5–15 | 6–14 | 14–6 | 15–5 | 4–16 | 15–5 | 6–14 | 9–11 | 12–8 | 11–9 | 13–7 |

=== Player of the week ===
Throughout the conference regular season, the Atlantic Coast Conference offices named one or two Players of the week and one or two Rookies of the week.

| Week | Player of the week | Rookie of the week | Reference |
|---|---|---|---|
| Week 1 – Nov 15 | Dereon Seabron – NC State | Paolo Banchero – Duke | |
| Week 2 – Nov 22 | Michael Devoe – Georgia Tech | AJ Griffin – Duke | |
| Week 3 – Nov 29 | Wendell Moore Jr. – Duke | Paolo Banchero (2) – Duke | |
| Week 4 – Dec 6 | Dereon Seabron (2) – NC State | Terquavion Smith – NC State | |
| Week 5 – Dec 13 | Alondes Williams – Wake Forest | Terquavion Smith (2) – NC State | |
| Week 5 – Dec 13 | Alondes Williams – Wake Forest | Blake Wesley – Notre Dame | |
| Week 6 – Dec 20 | Alondes Williams (2) – Wake Forest | Trevor Keels – Duke | |
| Week 7 – Dec 27 | Dane Goodwin – Notre Dame | Paolo Banchero (3) – Duke | |
| Week 7 – Dec 27 | Femi Odukale – Pittsburgh | Paolo Banchero (3) – Duke | |
| Week 8 – Jan 3 | Kameron McGusty – Miami | Matthew Cleveland – Florida State | |
| Week 9 – Jan 10 | Armando Bacot – North Carolina | Blake Wesley (2) – Notre Dame | |
| Week 10 – Jan 17 | Armando Bacot (2) – North Carolina | Paolo Banchero (4) – Duke | |
| Week 11 – Jan 24 | Jake LaRavia – Wake Forest | Blake Wesley (3) – Notre Dame | |
| Week 11 – Jan 24 | Jake LaRavia – Wake Forest | Paolo Banchero (5) – Duke | |
| Week 12 – Jan 31 | Buddy Boeheim – Syracuse | Paolo Banchero (6) – Duke | |
| Week 13 – Feb 7 | Paul Atkinson – Notre Dame | AJ Griffin (2) – Duke | |
| Week 14 – Feb 14 | Jayden Gardner – Virginia | Trevor Keels (2) – Duke | |
| Week 15 – Feb 21 | Jake LaRavia (2) – Wake Forest | Terquavion Smith (3) – NC State | |
| Week 16 – Feb 28 | Armando Bacot (3) – North Carolina | Matthew Cleveland (2) – Florida State | |
| Week 17 – Mar 7 | Brady Manek – North Carolina | Terquavion Smith (4) – NC State | |

=== Records against other conferences ===
2021–22 records against non-conference foes through games played on January 20, 2022. Records shown for regular season only.

| Power 7 Conferences & Gonzaga | Record |
|---|---|
| American | 3–3 |
| Big East | 2–4 |
| Big Ten | 7–11 |
| Big 12 | 0–3 |
| Pac-12 | 2–3 |
| SEC | 7–9 |
| Gonzaga | 1–0 |
| Power 7 Total | 22–33 |
| Other NCAA Division I Conferences | Record |
| American East | 1–2 |
| A-10 | 3–8 |
| ASUN | 6–0 |
| Big Sky | 1–0 |
| Big South | 10–0 |
| Big West | 1–0 |
| CAA | 7–1 |
| C-USA | 4–1 |
| Horizon League | 1–1 |
| Ivy League | 8–0 |
| MAAC | 2–1 |
| MAC | 2–1 |
| MEAC | 3–0 |
| MVC | 1–0 |
| Mountain West | 0–0 |
| NEC | 5–0 |
| OVC | 0–0 |
| Patriot League | 11–2 |
| Pacific West | 0–0 |
| SoCon | 5–2 |
| Southland | 2–0 |
| SWAC | 4–0 |
| The Summit | 0–0 |
| Sun Belt | 4–0 |
| WAC | 1–0 |
| WCC (not including Gonzaga) | 1–1 |
| Other Division I Total | 85–20 |
| NCAA Division I Total | 107–53 |

== Postseason ==
=== ACC tournament ===
- 2022 Atlantic Coast Conference Basketball Tournament was held at the Barclays Center in Brooklyn, New York.

First round
12 | Pittsburgh | 46
13 | Boston College | 66
10 | Clemson | 70
15 | NC State | 64
11 | Louisville | 84
14 | Georgia Tech | 74

Second round
8 | Florida State | 57
9 | Syracuse | 96
5 | Wake Forest | 77
13 | Boston College | 82*
7 | Virginia Tech | 76*
10 | Clemson | 75
6 | Virginia | 51
11 | Louisville | 50

Quarterfinals
1 | Duke | 88
9 | Syracuse | 79
4 | Miami | 71*
13 | Boston College | 69
2 | Notre Dame | 80
7 | Virginia Tech | 87
3 | North Carolina | 63
6 | Virginia | 43

Semifinals
1 | Duke | 80
4 | Miami | 76
7 | Virginia Tech | 72
3 | North Carolina | 59

Championship
1 | Duke | 67
7 | Virginia Tech | 82

* – Denotes overtime period

=== NCAA tournament ===
| Seed | Region | School | First Four | 1st round | 2nd round | Sweet 16 | Elite Eight | Final Four | Championship |
|---|---|---|---|---|---|---|---|---|---|
| 2 | West | Duke | Bye | W 78–61 vs. #15 Cal State Fullerton – (Greenville, SC) | W 85–76 vs. #7 Michigan State – (Greenville, SC) | W 78–73 vs. #3 Texas Tech – (San Francisco, CA) | W 78–69 vs. #4 Arkansas – (San Francisco, CA) | L 77–81 vs. #8 North Carolina – (New Orleans, LA) | |
| 8 | East | North Carolina | Bye | W 95–63 vs. #9 Marquette – (Fort Worth, TX) | W 93–86 (OT) vs. #1 Baylor – (Fort Worth, TX) | W 73–66 vs. #4 UCLA – (Philadelphia, PA) | W 69–49 vs. #15 Saint Peter's – (Philadelphia, PA) | W 81–77 vs. #2 Duke – (New Orleans, LA) | L 69-72 vs. #1 Kansas – (New Orleans, LA) |
| 10 | Midwest | Miami (FL) | Bye | W 68–66 vs. #7 USC – (Greenville, SC) | W 79–61 vs. #2 Auburn – (Greenville, SC) | W 70–56 vs. #11 Iowa State – (Chicago, IL) | L 50–76 vs. #1 Kansas – (Chicago, IL) | | |
| 11 | West | Notre Dame | W 89–87 (2OT) vs. #11 Rutgers – (Dayton, OH) | W 78–64 vs. #6 Alabama – (San Diego, CA) | L 53–59 vs. #3 Texas Tech – (San Diego, CA) | | | | |
| 11 | East | Virginia Tech | Bye | L 73–81 vs. #6 Texas – (Milwaukee, WI) | | | | | |
| | | W–L (%): | 1–0 (1.000) | 4–1 (.800) | 3–1 (.750) | 3–0 (1.000) | 2–1 (.667) | 1–1 (.500) | 0–1 (.000) Total: 14–5 (.737) |

=== National Invitation tournament ===
| Seed | Bracket | School | 1st round | 2nd round | Quarterfinals | Semifinals | Championship |
|---|---|---|---|---|---|---|---|
| 2 | Texas A&M | Wake Forest | W 74–64 vs. Towson – (Winston-Salem, NC) | W 80–74 vs. #3 VCU – (Winston-Salem, NC) | L 52–67 vs. #1 Texas A&M – (College Station, TX) | | |
| – | Oklahoma | Virginia | W 60–57 vs. #3 Mississippi State – (Charlottesville, VA) | W 71–69 (OT) at #2 North Texas – (Denton, TX) | L 51–52 vs. St. Bonaventure – (Charlottesville, VA) | | |
| | | W–L (%): | 2–0 (1.000) | 2–0 (1.000) | 0–2 (.000) | 0–0 (–) | 0–0 (–) Total: 4–2 (.667) |

== Honors and awards ==
=== All-Americans ===
Consensus All-Americans
| First Team | Second Team |
|---|---|
| None | Paolo Banchero |

To earn "consensus" status, a player must win honors based on a point system computed from the four different all-America teams. The point system consists of three points for first team, two points for second team and one point for third team. No honorable mention or fourth team or lower are used in the computation. The top five totals plus ties are first team and the next five plus ties are second team.

| Associated Press | NABC | Sporting News | USBWA |
First Team
| None | None | None | None |
Second Team
| None | Paolo Banchero | None | Paolo Banchero |
Third Team
| Paolo Banchero | None | Paolo Banchero | None |

=== ACC Awards ===
2022 ACC Men's Basketball Individual Awards
| Award | Recipient(s) |
| Player of the Year | Alondes Williams – Wake Forest |
| Coach of the Year | Steve Forbes – Wake Forest |
| Defensive Player of the Year | Mark Williams – Duke |
| Freshman of the Year | Paolo Banchero – Duke |
| Most Improved Player of the Year | Dereon Seabron – NC State |
| Sixth Man Award | Matthew Cleveland – Florida State |

2022 ACC Men's Basketball All-Conference Teams
| First Team | Second Team | Third Team | Honorable Mention |
| Armando Bacot – North Carolina; Alondes Williams – Wake Forest; Paolo Banchero – Duke; Kameron McGusty – Miami; Buddy Boeheim – Syracuse | Keve Aluma – Virginia Tech; Dereon Seabron – NC State; Wendell Moore Jr. – Duke; Blake Wesley – Notre Dame; Jake LaRavia – Wake Forest | Dane Goodwin – Notre Dame; Mark Williams – Duke; Isaiah Wong – Miami; Jayden Gardner – Virginia; Michael Devoe – Georgia Tech | Caleb Love – North Carolina; PJ Hall – Clemson; John Hugley – Pittsburgh; Charlie Moore – Miami; Brady Manek – North Carolina; Kihei Clark – Virginia; AJ Griffin – Duke; Paul Atkinson – Notre Dame; Terquavion Smith – NC State; Reece Beekman – Virginia |

2021 ACC Men's Basketball All-Freshman Team
| Player | Team |
| Paolo Banchero | Duke |
| AJ Griffin | Duke |
| Trevor Keels | Duke |
| Terquavion Smith | NC State |
| Blake Wesley | Notre Dame |

2021 ACC Men's Basketball All-Defensive Team
| Player | Team |
| Mark Williams | Duke |
| Wendell Moore Jr. | Duke |
| Reece Beekman | Virginia |
| Leaky Black | North Carolina |
| Charlie Moore | Miami |

== NBA draft ==
The ACC had seven players selected in the 2022 NBA Draft. Their six players selected in the first round was the most of any conference. Paolo Banchero was selected First Overall, becoming the ACC's twelfth number one overall pick. The ACC extended a streak of first round selections to 34 consecutive years, and for 14 straight drafts they have had at least three players selected in the first round.

| PG | Point guard | SG | Shooting guard | SF | Small forward | PF | Power forward | C | Center |

| Player | Team | Round | Pick # | Position | School |
|---|---|---|---|---|---|
| Paolo Banchero | Orlando Magic | 1 | 1 | PF | Duke |
| Mark Williams | Charlotte Hornets | 1 | 15 | C | Duke |
| AJ Griffin | Atlanta Hawks | 1 | 16 | SF | Duke |
| Jake LaRavia | Minnesota Timberwolves | 1 | 19 | SF | Wake Forest |
| Blake Wesley | San Antonio Spurs | 1 | 25 | PG | Notre Dame |
| Wendell Moore Jr. | Minnesota Timberwolves | 1 | 26 | SF | Duke |
| Trevor Keels | New York Knicks | 2 | 42 | SG | Duke |

== Attendance ==
| Team | Arena | Capacity | Game 1 | Game 2 | Game 3 | Game 4 | Game 5 | Game 6 | Game 7 | Game 8 | Game 9 | Game 10 | Total | Average | % of Capacity |
| Team | Arena | Capacity | Game 11 | Game 12 | Game 13 | Game 14 | Game 15 | Game 16 | Game 17 | Game 18 | Game 19 | Game 20 | Total | Average | % of Capacity |
| Boston College | Conte Forum | 8,606 | 4,218 | 4,463 | 3,903 | 4,077 | 3,718 | 6,023 | 3,872 | 5,516 | 3,591 | 4,714 | 78,676 | 4,917 | 57.14% |
| Boston College | Conte Forum | 8,606 | 4,507 | 5,666 | 8,606 | 5,441 | 6,316 | 4,045 | | | | | 78,676 | 4,917 | 57.14% |
| Clemson | Littlejohn Coliseum | 9,000 | 6,144 | 8,118 | 5,411 | 5,770 | 5,154 | 6,677 | 5,202 | 7,443 | 7,408 | 6,578 | 106,578 | 6,661 | 74.01% |
| Clemson | Littlejohn Coliseum | 9,000 | 7,470 | 9,000 | 7,524 | 5,782 | 5,602 | 7,295 | | | | | 106,578 | 6,661 | 74.01% |
| Duke | Cameron Indoor Stadium | 9,314 | 9,314 | 9,314 | 9,314 | 9,314 | 9,314 | 9,314 | 9,314 | 9,314 | 9,314 | 9,314 | 167,652 | 9,314 | 100% |
| Duke | Cameron Indoor Stadium | 9,314 | 9,314 | 9,314 | 9,314 | 9,314 | 9,314 | 9,314 | 9,314 | 9,314 | | | 167,652 | 9,314 | 100% |
| Florida State | Donald L. Tucker Center | 11,675 | 9,746 | 9,030 | 6,670 | 9,808 | 5,027 | 9,527 | 10,339 | 11,500 | 2,088 | 11,500 | 126,262 | 8,417 | 72.1% |
| Florida State | Donald L. Tucker Center | 11,675 | 10,089 | 6,891 | 6,801 | 8,401 | 8,845 | | | | | | 126,262 | 8,417 | 72.1% |
| Georgia Tech | McCamish Pavilion | 8,600 | 4,221 | 4,802 | 3,625 | 3,912 | 4,486 | 6,302 | 6,217 | 4,228 | 4,853 | 5,813 | 86,954 | 4,831 | 56.17% |
| Georgia Tech | McCamish Pavilion | 8,600 | 4,698 | 4,127 | 4,697 | 5,135 | 5,784 | 4,568 | 4,150 | 5,336 | | | 86,954 | 4,831 | 56.17% |
| Louisville | KFC Yum! Center | 22,090 | 12,643 | 12,431 | 12,223 | 12,561 | 13,127 | 12,247 | 14,120 | 11,973 | 11,973 | 12,123 | 211,867 | 13,242 | 59.94% |
| Louisville | KFC Yum! Center | 22,090 | 16,175 | 18,493 | 13,386 | 12,065 | 13,242 | 13,085 | | | | | 211,867 | 13,242 | 59.94% |
| Miami | Watsco Center | 7,972 | 3,234 | 2,950 | 3,175 | 3,388 | 2,753 | 2,232 | 3,014 | 3,376 | 4,506 | 5,979 | 64,383 | 4,292 | 53.84% |
| Miami | Watsco Center | 7,972 | 7,972 | 6,363 | 3,866 | 5,596 | 5,979 | | | | | | 64,383 | 4,292 | 53.84% |
| North Carolina | Dean Smith Center | 21,750 | 14,992 | 16,854 | 15,710 | 19,938 | 16,607 | 14,342 | 19,386 | 20,638 | 18,568 | 19,357 | 315,115 | 18,536 | 85.22% |
| North Carolina | Dean Smith Center | 21,750 | 17,237 | 21,750 | 21,750 | 20,348 | 17,270 | 18,618 | 21,750 | | | | 315,115 | 18,536 | 85.22% |
| NC State | PNC Arena | 19,722 | 13,131 | 11,949 | 11,806 | 10,919 | 11,562 | 13,029 | 5,429 | 11,344 | 12,529 | 13,425 | 207,165 | 12,186 | 61.79% |
| NC State | PNC Arena | 19,722 | 13,286 | 12,811 | 12,634 | 13,690 | 11,635 | 11,282 | 16,704 | | | | 207,165 | 12,186 | 61.79% |
| Notre Dame | Edmund P. Joyce Center | 9,149 | 5,062 | 5,124 | 8,283 | 4,903 | 5,970 | 6,259 | 7,618 | 6,881 | 8,495 | 9,149 | 109,246 | 12,186 | 79.61% |
| Notre Dame | Edmund P. Joyce Center | 9,149 | 8,260 | 7,700 | 7,838 | 9,149 | 8,555 | | | | | | 109,246 | 12,186 | 79.61% |
| Pittsburgh | Petersen Events Center | 12,508 | 7,585 | 7,261 | 7,612 | 7,460 | 7,400 | 7,736 | 7,328 | 7,579 | 7,392 | 8,656 | 153,077 | 8,057 | 64.41% |
| Pittsburgh | Petersen Events Center | 12,508 | 7,876 | 8,431 | 7,595 | 8,066 | 8,533 | 8,027 | 9,085 | 7,360 | 12,095 | | 153,077 | 8,057 | 64.41% |
| Syracuse | Carrier Dome | 33,000 | 19,929 | 20,841 | 15,604 | 21,330 | 15,526 | 15,579 | 17,295 | 15,214 | 17,287 | 15,210 | 305,326 | 19,083 | 57.83% |
| Syracuse | Carrier Dome | 33,000 | 8,066 | 23,194 | 23,298 | 23,019 | 22,042 | 31,803 | 23,108 | | | | 305,326 | 19,083 | 57.83% |
| Virginia | John Paul Jones Arena | 14,593 | 13,100 | 13,568 | 12,980 | 12,647 | 13,542 | 14,257 | 13,197 | 13,857 | 13,573 | 13,924 | 218,168 | 13,636 | 93.44% |
| Virginia | John Paul Jones Arena | 14,593 | 13,076 | 12,847 | 14,089 | 14,253 | 14,629 | 14,629 | | | | | 218,168 | 13,636 | 93.44% |
| Virginia Tech | Cassell Coliseum | 9,275 | 6,473 | 6,835 | 6,437 | 4,730 | 8,925 | 6,403 | 5,148 | 8,925 | 7,086 | 6,887 | 114,274 | 7,618 | 82.14% |
| Virginia Tech | Cassell Coliseum | 9,275 | 8,925 | 8,925 | 9,825 | 9,825 | 8,925 | | | | | | 114,274 | 7,618 | 82.14% |
| Wake Forest | LJVM Coliseum | 14,665 | 3,710 | 4,359 | 3,349 | 3,470 | 3,554 | 3,711 | 4,296 | 3,587 | 4,782 | 7,220 | 109,514 | 6,084 | 41.49% |
| Wake Forest | LJVM Coliseum | 14,665 | 14,213 | 11,898 | 4,928 | 5,328 | 7,698 | 8,355 | 8,139 | 6,917 | | | 109,514 | 6,084 | 41.49% |
