= 2022 ACC men's basketball tournament =

American college basketball competition

- 2022 ACC Tournament logo
- Classification: Division I
- Season: 2021–22
- Teams: 15
- Site: Barclays Center; Brooklyn, New York
- Champions: Virginia Tech (1st title)
- Winning coach: Mike Young (1st title)
- MVP: Hunter Cattoor (Virginia Tech)
- Television: ESPN, ESPN2, ACCN

2021–22 ACC men's basketball standings
	Conf.				Overall
Team	W		L	PCT	W		L	PCT
No. 9 Duke	16	–	4	.800	32	–	7	.821
North Carolina	15	–	5	.750	29	–	10	.744
Notre Dame	15	–	5	.750	24	–	11	.686
Miami (FL)	14	–	6	.700	26	–	11	.703
Wake Forest	13	–	7	.650	25	–	10	.714
Virginia	12	–	8	.600	21	–	14	.600
Virginia Tech †	11	–	9	.550	23	–	13	.639
Florida State	10	–	10	.500	17	–	14	.548
Syracuse	9	–	11	.450	16	–	17	.485
Clemson	8	–	12	.400	17	–	16	.515
Louisville	6	–	14	.300	13	–	19	.406
Boston College	6	–	14	.300	13	–	20	.394
Pittsburgh	6	–	14	.300	11	–	21	.344
Georgia Tech	5	–	15	.250	12	–	20	.375
NC State	4	–	16	.200	11	–	21	.344
† 2022 ACC tournament winner Rankings from AP poll

The 2022 ACC men's basketball tournament was the postseason men's basketball tournament for the 2021–22 Atlantic Coast Conference men's basketball season. It was held at the Barclays Center in Brooklyn, New York, during March 8–12, 2022. The 2022 tournament was the 69th annual edition of the tournament. The Virginia Tech Hokies won the tournament, their first ACC Tournament title and only their second conference tournament title in program history, receiving the conference's automatic bid to the 2022 NCAA tournament. The Hokies were the second ACC champion to win four tournament games to secure the title and were the lowest overall seed to win the title, until NC State won the 2024 tournament as a 10-seed two years later.

== Seeds ==
All 15 ACC teams participated in the tournament. Teams were seeded by conference record, with a tiebreaker system to seed teams that finished with identical conference records. Duke secured the regular season title and the first overall seed. Notre Dame, North Carolina, and Miami were the other teams to secure double-byes.

Seed	School	Conference Record	Tiebreaker
1	Duke‡†	16–4	
2	Notre Dame†	15–5	1–0 vs. UNC
3	North Carolina†	15–5	0–1 vs. ND
4	Miami†	14–6	
5	Wake Forest#	13–7	
6	Virginia#	12–8	
7	Virginia Tech#	11–9	
8	Florida State#	10–10	
9	Syracuse#	9–11	
10	Clemson	8–12	
11	Louisville	6–14	2–1 vs. BC/PITT
12	Pittsburgh	6–14	2–2 vs. BC/LOU
13	Boston College	6–14	1–2 vs. LOU/PITT
14	Georgia Tech	5–15	
15	NC State	4–16	

‡ – ACC Regular Season Champions.
† – Received a double-bye in the conference tournament.
# – Received a single-bye in the conference tournament.

== Schedule ==
Session	Game	Time	Matchup	Score	Television	Attendance
First round – Tuesday, March 8
Opening Day	1	2:00 pm	No. 12 Pittsburgh vs. No. 13 Boston College	46–66	ACCN	6,222
Opening Day	2	4:30 pm	No. 10 Clemson vs. No. 15 NC State	70–64	ACCN	6,222
Opening Day	3	7:00 pm	No. 11 Louisville vs. No. 14 Georgia Tech	84–74	ACCN	6,222
Second round – Wednesday, March 9
1	4	12:00 pm	No. 8 Florida State vs. No. 9 Syracuse	57–96	ESPN	
1	5	2:30 pm	No. 5 Wake Forest vs. No. 13 Boston College	77–82 (OT)	ESPN	
2	6	7:00 pm	No. 7 Virginia Tech vs. No. 10 Clemson	76–75 (OT)	ESPN2	8,174
2	7	9:30 pm	No. 6 Virginia vs. No. 11 Louisville	51–50	ESPN2	8,174
Quarterfinals – Thursday, March 10
3	8	12:00 pm	No. 1 Duke vs. No. 9 Syracuse	88–79	ESPN	11,511
3	9	2:30 pm	No. 4 Miami vs. No. 13 Boston College	71–69 (OT)	ESPN2	11,511
4	10	7:00 pm	No. 2 Notre Dame vs. No. 7 Virginia Tech	80–87	ESPN2	15,994
4	11	9:30 pm	No. 3 North Carolina vs. No. 6 Virginia	63–43	ESPN	15,994
Semifinals – Friday, March 11
5	12	7:00 pm	No. 1 Duke vs. No. 4 Miami	80–76	ESPN	15,994
5	13	9:30 pm	No. 7 Virginia Tech vs. No. 3 North Carolina	72–59	ESPN	15,994
Championship – Saturday, March 12
6	14	8:30 pm	No. 1 Duke vs. No. 7 Virginia Tech	67–82	ESPN	17,764
Game times in ET. Rankings denote tournament seed.

== Bracket ==
First round Tuesday, March 8 ACCN
12	Pittsburgh	46
13	Boston College	66
10	Clemson	70
15	North Carolina State	64
11	Louisville	84
14	Georgia Tech	74

Second round Wednesday, March 9 ESPN/ESPN2
8	Florida State	57
9	Syracuse	96
5	Wake Forest	77
13	Boston College	82^{OT}
7	Virginia Tech	76^{OT}
10	Clemson	75
6	Virginia	51
11	Louisville	50

Quarterfinals; Thursday, March 10; ESPN/ESPN2
1	Duke	88
9	Syracuse	79
4	Miami	71^{OT}
13	Boston College	69
2	Notre Dame	80
7	Virginia Tech	87
3	North Carolina	63
6	Virginia	43

Semifinals; Friday, March 11; ESPN/ESPN2
1	Duke	80
4	Miami	76
7	Virginia Tech	72
3	North Carolina	59

Championship; Saturday, March 12; ESPN
1	Duke	67
7	Virginia Tech	82

== Game summaries ==
=== First round ===
ACCN

March 8
2:00 p.m.

Report

No. 12 Pittsburgh 46, No. 13 Boston College 66
Scoring by half: 22–33, 24–33
Pts: Hugley (15); Rebs: Hugley (8); Asts: Gueye (3)	Pts: Karnik (13); Rebs: Langford (5); Asts: Bickerstaff (5)

Barclays Center
Brooklyn, NY
Referees: Lee Cassell, Mark Schnur, Tommy Morrissey

ACCN

March 8
4:30 p.m.

Report

No. 10 Clemson 70, No. 15 North Carolina State 64
Scoring by half: 29–24, 41–40
Pts: Hall (18); Rebs: Collins, Hall (10); Asts: Hunter (4)	Pts: Seabron (19); Rebs: Seabron (12); Asts: Seabron (6)

Barclays Center
Brooklyn, NY
Referees: Jerry Heater, A.J. Desai, Jamie Luckie

ACCN

March 8
7:00 p.m.

Report

No. 11 Louisville 84, No. 14 Georgia Tech 74
Scoring by half: 45–28, 39–46
Pts: West (20); Rebs: Williams (10); Asts: Ellis (6)	Pts: Kelly, Usher (19); Rebs: Usher (6); Asts: Usher (9)

Barclays Center
Brooklyn, NY
Attendance: 6,222
Referees: Bill Covington, Raymie Styons, Tony Henderson

=== Second round ===
ESPN

March 9
12:00 p.m.

Report

No. 8 Florida State 57, No. 9 Syracuse 96
Scoring by half: 26–49, 31–47
Pts: Cleveland (13); Rebs: Polite (7); Asts: Evans (5)	Pts: Swider (28); Rebs: Anselem (15); Asts: Torrence (9)

Barclays Center
Brooklyn, NY
Referees: Ted Valentine, Brian Dorsey, Mark Schnur

ESPN

March 9
2:30 p.m.

Report

No. 5 Wake Forest 77, No. 13 Boston College 82 (OT)
Scoring by half: 29–30, 41–40 Overtime: 7–12
Pts: LaRavia (21); Rebs: LaRavia (7); Asts: Tied (4)	Pts: Langford (19); Rebs: Tied (7); Asts: Ashton-Langford (5)

Barclays Center
Brooklyn, NY
Referees: Ron Groover, A.J. Desai, Jerry Heater

ESPN2

March 9
7:00 p.m.

Report

No. 7 Virginia Tech 76, No. 10 Clemson 75 (OT)
Scoring by half: 43–32, 23–34 Overtime: 10–9
Pts: Aluma (19); Rebs: Aluma/Mutts (10); Asts: Murphy (4)	Pts: Hall (16); Rebs: Tyson (7); Asts: Dawes (4)

Barclays Center
Brooklyn, NY
Referees: Roger Ayers, Tommy Morissey, Tony Henderson

ESPN2

March 9
9:30 p.m.

Report

No. 6 Virginia 51, No. 11 Louisville 50
Scoring by half: 20–24, 31–26
Pts: Gardner (17); Rebs: Cáffaro (8); Asts: Beekman (9)	Pts: Williams (11); Rebs: Williams (13); Asts: West (3)

Barclays Center
Brooklyn, NY
Attendance: 8,174
Referees: Bert Smith, Lee Cassell, Clarence Armstrong

=== Quarterfinals ===
ESPN

March 10
12:00 p.m.

Report

No. 1 Duke 88, No. 9 Syracuse 79
Scoring by half: 36–40, 52–39
Pts: Moore Jr. (26); Rebs: Williams (16); Asts: Moore (8)	Pts: J. Boehiem (28); Rebs: J. Boehiem (8); Asts: Torrence (11)

Barclays Center
Brooklyn, NY
Referees: Ron Groover, Tommy Morrissey, Tony Henderson

ESPN2

March 10
2:30 p.m.

Report

No. 4 Miami 71, No. 13 Boston College 69 (OT)
Scoring by half: 34–32, 31–33 Overtime: 6–4
Pts: McGusty (16); Rebs: Waardenburg (9); Asts: Wong, Moore (6)	Pts: Post (14); Rebs: Langford Jr. (7); Asts: Langford Jr., Zachery, Galloway (3)

Barclays Center
Brooklyn, NY
Attendance: 11,511
Referees: Brian Dorsey, Bill Covington, Ted Valentine

ESPN2

March 10
7:00 p.m.

Report

No. 2 Notre Dame 80, No. 7 Virginia Tech 87
Scoring by half: 31–42, 49–45
Pts: Hubb (23); Rebs: Laszewski (10); Asts: Hubb (5)	Pts: Aluma (20); Rebs: Mutts (10); Asts: Mutts (5)

Barclays Center
Brooklyn, NY
Referees: Bert Smith, Raymie Styons, Clarence Armstrong

ESPN

March 10
9:30 p.m.

Report

No. 3 North Carolina 63, No. 6 Virginia 43
Scoring by half: 33–13, 30–30
Pts: Manek (21); Rebs: Bacot (11); Asts: Davis (6)	Pts: Gardner (17); Rebs: Caffaro (6); Asts: Beekman (5)

Barclays Center
Brooklyn, NY
Attendance: 15,994
Referees: Roger Ayers, A.J. Desai, Jamie Luckie

=== Semifinals ===
ESPN

March 11
7:00 p.m.

Report

No. 1 Duke 80, No. 4 Miami 76
Scoring by half: 36–36, 44–40
Pts: Griffin (21); Rebs: Banchero (11); Asts: Banchero (4)	Pts: McGusty (24); Rebs: Miller (13); Asts: Moore (8)

Barclays Center
Brooklyn, NY
Attendance: 15,994
Referees: Tony Henderson, Jamie Luckie, Bert Smith

ESPN

March 11
9:30 p.m.

Report

No. 3 North Carolina 59, No. 7 Virginia Tech 72
Scoring by half: 26–32, 33–40
Pts: Bacot (19); Rebs: Bacot (14); Asts: Black/Love (4)	Pts: Maddox (20); Rebs: Maddox (6); Asts: Murphy (7)

Barclays Center
Brooklyn, NY
Attendance: 15,994
Referees: Lee Cassell, Ted Valentine, Bill Covington

=== Final ===
ESPN

March 12
8:30 p.m.

Report

No. 1 Duke 67, No. 7 Virginia Tech 82
Scoring by half: 39–42, 28–40
Pts: Banchero (20); Rebs: Moore Jr. (6); Asts: Keels (4)	Pts: Cattoor (31); Rebs: Aluma (10); Asts: Aluma (7)

Barclays Center
Brooklyn, NY
Attendance: 17,764
Referees: Clarence Armstrong, Ron Groover, Roger Ayers

== Awards and honors ==
Tournament MVP: Hunter Cattoor, Virginia Tech

All-Tournament Teams:

First Team
- Hunter Cattoor, Virginia Tech
- Keve Aluma, Virginia Tech
- Paolo Banchero, Duke
- Wendell Moore Jr., Duke
- Kameron McGusty, Miami (FL)

Second Team
- Storm Murphy, Virginia Tech
- Darius Maddox, Virginia Tech
- Armando Bacot, UNC
- Jimmy Boeheim, Syracuse
- Quinten Post, Boston College

== See also ==
- 2022 ACC women's basketball tournament
