= 2021–22 Clemson Tigers men's basketball team =

American college basketball season

2021–22 Clemson Tigers men's basketball
- Conference: Atlantic Coast Conference
- Record: 17–16 (8–12 ACC)
- Head coach: Brad Brownell (12th season)
- Assistant coaches: Antonio Reynolds-Dean (5th season); Dick Bender (6th season); Kareem Richardson (1st season)
- Home arena: Littlejohn Coliseum (Capacity: 9,000)

2021–22 ACC men's basketball standings
	Conf.				Overall
Team	W		L	PCT	W		L	PCT
No. 9 Duke	16	–	4	.800	32	–	7	.821
North Carolina	15	–	5	.750	29	–	10	.744
Notre Dame	15	–	5	.750	24	–	11	.686
Miami (FL)	14	–	6	.700	26	–	11	.703
Wake Forest	13	–	7	.650	25	–	10	.714
Virginia	12	–	8	.600	21	–	14	.600
Virginia Tech †	11	–	9	.550	23	–	13	.639
Florida State	10	–	10	.500	17	–	14	.548
Syracuse	9	–	11	.450	16	–	17	.485
Clemson	8	–	12	.400	17	–	16	.515
Louisville	6	–	14	.300	13	–	19	.406
Boston College	6	–	14	.300	13	–	20	.394
Pittsburgh	6	–	14	.300	11	–	21	.344
Georgia Tech	5	–	15	.250	12	–	20	.375
NC State	4	–	16	.200	11	–	21	.344
† 2022 ACC tournament winner Rankings from AP poll

The 2021–22 Clemson Tigers men's basketball team represented Clemson University during the 2021–22 NCAA Division I men's basketball season. The Tigers were led by twelfth-year head coach Brad Brownell and played their home games at Littlejohn Coliseum in Clemson, South Carolina as members of the Atlantic Coast Conference.

The Tigers finished the season 17–16 overall and 8–12 in ACC play to finish in tenth place. As the tenth seed in the ACC tournament, they defeated fifteenth seed NC State in the first round before losing to seventh seed, and eventual champions Virginia Tech in the second round. They were not invited to the NCAA tournament or the NIT.

== Previous season ==
The Tigers finished the 2020–21 season 16–8, 10–6 in ACC play to finish in a tie for fifth place. As the fifth seed in the ACC tournament they earned a bye into the Second Round where they lost to Miami. They earned an at-large bid to the NCAA tournament as a seven seed in the Midwest Region. They lost in the first round to 10 seed Rutgers.

== Offseason ==
=== Coaching changes ===
Assistant coach Anthony Goins was hired by Boston College to be an assistant coach. The Tigers named Kareem Richardson as his replacement on April 22.

=== Departures ===
Clemson Departures
Name	Number	Pos.	Height	Weight	Year	Hometown	Reason for departure
Clyde Trapp	0	G	6'4"	203	Senior	Eastover, South Carolina	Transferred to Charlotte
Jonathan Baehre	1	F	6'10"	214	Senior	Hessen, Germany	Began Professional Career overseas
Olivier-Maxence Prosper	10	G/F	6'8"	218	Freshman	Montreal, Quebec	Transferred to Marquette
John Newman III	15	G	6'5"	207	Junior	Greensboro, North Carolina	Transferred to Cincinnati
O'Neil McBride	20	F	6'7"	207	Sophomore	Myrtle Beach, South Carolina	—
Wells Hoag	21	G	6'3"	199	Junior	Greenville, South Carolina	—
Lynn Kidd	22	C	6'10"	235	Freshman	Gainesville, Florida	Transferred to Virginia Tech
Aamir Simms	25	F	6'8"	245	Senior	Palmyra, Virginia	Graduated

=== Incoming transfers ===
Clemson incoming transfers
Name	Number	Pos.	Height	Weight	Year	Hometown	Previous school
David Collins	13	G	6'4"	217	Graduate Student	Youngstown, OH	USF
Naz Bohannon	33	F	6'6"	232	Graduate Student	Lorain, OH	Youngstown State

=== 2021 recruiting class ===
College recruiting information
Name	Hometown	School	Height	Weight	Commit date
Josh Beadle; G	Columbia, South Carolina	Cardinal Newman	6 ft 3 in (1.91 m)	165 lb (75 kg)	Jun 27, 2020
Josh Beadle; G	Recruit ratings: Rivals: 247Sports: ESPN: (80)				
Ian Schieffelin; F	Loganville, Georgia	Grayson	6 ft 8 in (2.03 m)	215 lb (98 kg)	Sep 21, 2020
Ian Schieffelin; F	Recruit ratings: Rivals: 247Sports: ESPN: (79)				
Ben Middlebrooks; F	Fort Lauderdale, Florida	Calvary Christian	6 ft 11 in (2.11 m)	190 lb (86 kg)	Aug 11, 2021
Ben Middlebrooks; F	Recruit ratings: Rivals: 247Sports: ESPN:				
Overall recruit ranking:
Note: In many cases, Scout, Rivals, 247Sports, On3, and ESPN may conflict in their listings of height and weight.; In these cases, the average was taken. ESPN grades are on a 100-point scale.; Sources: "2021 Clemson Basketball Commitment List". Rivals.; "Clemson Tigers". ESPN.; "2021 Team Ranking". Rivals.

== Roster ==
2021–22 Clemson Tigers men's basketball team
Players
Coaches

Pos.	#	Name	Height	Weight	Year	Hometown
G	0	Josh Beadle	6 ft 3 in (1.91 m)	180 lb (82 kg)	Fr	Columbia, South Carolina
F	1	Ian Schieffelin	6 ft 7 in (2.01 m)	225 lb (102 kg)	Fr	Loganville, Georgia
G	2	Al-Amir Dawes	6 ft 2 in (1.88 m)	182 lb (83 kg)	Jr	Newark, New Jersey
G	3	Chase Hunter	6 ft 3 in (1.91 m)	204 lb (93 kg)	RS So	Atlanta, Georgia
G	4	Nick Honor	5 ft 10 in (1.78 m)	195 lb (88 kg)	RS Jr	Orlando, Florida
F	5	Hunter Tyson	6 ft 8 in (2.03 m)	215 lb (98 kg)	Sr	Monroe, North Carolina
F/C	10	Ben Middlebrooks	6 ft 10 in (2.08 m)	232 lb (105 kg)	Fr	Fort Lauderdale, Florida
G/F	11	Parker Fox	6 ft 7 in (2.01 m)	210 lb (95 kg)	Sr	Reno, Nevada
G	12	Alex Hemenway	6 ft 3 in (1.91 m)	195 lb (88 kg)	Jr	Newburgh, Indiana
G	13	David Collins	6 ft 4 in (1.93 m)	217 lb (98 kg)	GS	Youngstown, Ohio
G	14	Devin Foster (W)	6 ft 2 in (1.88 m)	180 lb (82 kg)	Jr	Canton, Massachusetts
G	15	Jack Nauseef (W)	6 ft 1 in (1.85 m)	160 lb (73 kg)	Jr	Dayton, Ohio
F/C	24	PJ Hall	6 ft 10 in (2.08 m)	240 lb (109 kg)	So	Spartanburg, South Carolina
F	32	Daniel Nauseef (W)	6 ft 7 in (2.01 m)	215 lb (98 kg)	Fr	Dayton, Ohio
F	33	Naz Bohannon	6 ft 6 in (1.98 m)	232 lb (105 kg)	GS	Lorain, Ohio

Head coach

- Brad Brownell (DePauw)

Assistant coach(es)

- Antonio Reynolds Dean (Rhode Island)
- Dick Bender (McDaniel)
- Kareem Richardson (Evansville)

Legend

- (C) Team captain
- (S) Suspended
- (I) Ineligible
- (W) Walk-on
- Injured
- Current redshirt

Roster
Last update: January 9, 2022

== Schedule and results ==
Date time, TV	Rank^{#}	Opponent^{#}	Result	Record	High points	High rebounds	High assists	Site (attendance) city, state
Exbitition
November 1, 2021*; 7:00 p.m.		Georgia Southwestern State	W 77–51	–	23 – Hall	7 – Tyson	7 – Honor	Littlejohn Coliseum (1,027); Clemson, SC
Regular season
November 9, 2021*; 7:00 p.m., ACCNX		Presbyterian	W 64–53	1–0	21 – Dawes	8 – Hall	4 – Honor	Littlejohn Coliseum (6,144); Clemson, SC
November 12, 2021*; 7:00 p.m., ACCNX		Wofford	W 76–68	2–0	22 – Hall	8 – Hall	4 – Honor	Littlejohn Coliseum (8,118); Clemson, SC
November 15, 2021*; 7:00 p.m., ACCRSN		Bryant	W 93–70	3–0	20 – Tyson	9 – Collins	7 – Honor	Littlejohn Coliseum (5,411); Clemson, SC
November 18, 2021*; 4:00 p.m., ESPN2		vs. Temple; Charleston Classic Quarterfinals	W 75–48	4–0	19 – Honor	9 – Collins	3 – Tied	TD Arena (3,639); Charleston, SC
November 19, 2021*; 2:00 p.m., ESPN2		vs. No. 22 St. Bonaventure; Charleston Classic Semifinals	L 65–68	4–1	22 – Hall	8 – Hall	3 – Honor	TD Arena (3,464); Charleston, SC
November 21, 2021*; 5:00 p.m., ESPN2		vs. West Virginia; Charleston Classic Consolation – 3rd Place	L 59–66	4–2	18 – Dawes	6 – Tyson	4 – Bohannon	TD Arena (0); Charleston, SC
November 26, 2021*; 7:00 p.m., ACCNX		Charleston Southern	W 91–59	5–2	17 – Honor	7 – Tied	7 – Honor	Littlejohn Coliseum (5,770); Clemson, SC
November 30, 2021*; 9:00 p.m., ESPN2		at Rutgers; ACC–Big Ten Challenge	L 64–74	5–3	18 – Collins	10 – Collins	3 – Tied	Jersey Mike's Arena (8,050); Piscataway, NJ
December 4, 2021; 12:00 p.m., ACCN		at Miami (FL)	L 75–80	5–4 (0–1)	18 – Hall	9 – Collins	5 – Collins	Watsco Center (3,388); Coral Gables, FL
December 11, 2021*; 2:00 p.m., ACCN		vs. Drake; Holiday Hoopsgiving	W 90–80 ^{OT}	6–4	22 – Hall	13 – Hall	5 – Dawes	State Farm Arena (8,557); Atlanta, GA
December 14, 2021*; 7:00 p.m., ACCNX		Miami (OH)	W 89–76	7–4	17 – Hemenway	8 – Tied	6 – Collins	Littlejohn Coliseum (5,154); Clemson, SC
December 18, 2021*; 6:00 p.m., ACCN		South Carolina; Rivalry	W 70–56	8–4	18 – Tyson	13 – Tyson	3 – Dawes	Littlejohn Coliseum (6,677); Clemson, SC
December 22, 2021; 7:00 p.m., ACCN		at Virginia	W 67–50	9–4 (1–1)	17 – Tyson	11 – Collins	2 – 4 tied	John Paul Jones Arena (13,857); Charlottesville, VA
January 4, 2022; 9:00 p.m., ACCRSN		Virginia	L 65–75	9–5 (1–2)	15 – Tyson	9 – Tyson	4 – Honor	Littlejohn Coliseum (5,202); Clemson, SC
January 8, 2022; 12:00 p.m., ACCRSN		at NC State	W 70–65	10–5 (2–2)	20 – Hall	11 – Collins	2 – 5 tied	PNC Arena (13,425); Raleigh, NC
January 12, 2022; 7:00 p.m., ACCRSN		at Notre Dame	L 56–72	10–6 (2–3)	14 – Hall	7 – Hall	3 – Tied	Edmund P. Joyce Center (7,618); South Bend, IN
January 15, 2022; 6:30 p.m., ACCRSN		Boston College	L 68–70	10–7 (2–4)	17 – Dawes	12 – Bohannon	3 – Collins	Littlejohn Coliseum (7,443); Clemson, SC
January 18, 2022; 9:00 p.m., ACCN		at Syracuse	L 78–91	10–8 (2–5)	19 – Hall	11 – Hall	5 – Tied	Carrier Dome (15,210); Syracuse, NY
January 22, 2022; 4:00 p.m., ACCN		Pittsburgh	W 75–48	11–8 (3–5)	19 – Dawes	7 – Collins	6 – Collins	Littlejohn Coliseum (7,408); Clemson, SC
January 25, 2022; 7:00 p.m., ESPN2		at No. 9 Duke	L 69–71	11–9 (3–6)	14 – Hall	10 – Hall	5 – Hunter	Cameron Indoor Stadium (9,314); Durham, NC
February 2, 2022; 7:00 p.m., ACCN		Florida State	W 75–69	12–9 (4–6)	15 – Hall	8 – Collins	4 – Honor	Littlejohn Coliseum (6,578); Clemson, SC
February 5, 2022; 2:00 p.m., ACCRSN		at Georgia Tech	L 64–69	12–10 (4–7)	18 – Tied	8 – Tied	5 – Hunter	McCamish Pavilion (5,784); Atlanta, GA
February 8, 2022; 6:00 p.m., ACCN		North Carolina	L 77–79	12–11 (4–8)	24 – Hall	6 – Hunter	3 – 4 Tied	Littlejohn Coliseum (7,470); Clemson, SC
February 10, 2022; 8:00 p.m., ACCN		No. 7 Duke; Rescheduled from Dec. 29, 2021	L 64–82	12–12 (4–9)	17 – Hall	10 – Schieffelin	4 – Dawes	Littlejohn Coliseum (9,000); Clemson, SC
February 12, 2022; 7:00 p.m., ACCN		Notre Dame	L 61–76	12–13 (4–10)	19 – Hall	9 – Schieffelin	3 – Hunter	Littlejohn Coliseum (7,524); Clemson, SC
February 15, 2022; 7:00 p.m., ACCRSN		at Florida State	L 80–81	12–14 (4–11)	28 – Hall	11 – Collins	4 – Tied	Donald L. Tucker Civic Center (6,801); Tallahassee, FL
February 19, 2022; 3:00 p.m., ACCRSN		at Louisville	L 61–70	12–15 (4–12)	18 – Dawes	10 – Collins	4 – Collins	KFC Yum! Center (13,242); Louisville, KY
February 23, 2022; 7:00 p.m., ACCN		Wake Forest	W 80–69	13–15 (5–12)	21 – Hunter	8 – Collins	4 – Dawes	Littlejohn Coliseum (5,782); Clemson, SC
February 26, 2022; 3:00 p.m., ACCN		at Boston College	W 70–60	14–15 (6–12)	23 – Hunter	10 – Collins	2 – Tied	Conte Forum (6,316); Chestnut Hill, MA
March 2, 2022; 7:00 p.m., ACCN		Georgia Tech	W 68–65	15–15 (7–12)	19 – Collins	7 – Collins	4 – Collins	Littlejohn Coliseum (5,602); Clemson, SC
March 5, 2022; 2:00 p.m., ACCRSN		Virginia Tech	W 63–59	16–15 (8–12)	12 – Hall	4 – Tied	4 – Schieffelin	Littlejohn Coliseum (7,295); Clemson, SC
ACC tournament
March 8, 2022; 4:30 p.m., ACCN	(10)	vs. (15) NC State; First Round	W 70–64	17–15	18 – Hall	10 – Hall	4 – Hunter	Barclays Center (6,222); Brooklyn, NY
March 9, 2022; 7:00 p.m., ESPN2	(10)	vs. (7) Virginia Tech; Second Round	L 75–76 ^{OT}	17–16	16 – Hall	7 – Tyson	4 – Dawes	Barclays Center (8,174); Brooklyn, NY
*Non-conference game. ^{#}Rankings from AP Poll. (#) Tournament seedings in parentheses. All times are in Eastern Time.

== Rankings ==
Ranking movements Legend: — = Not ranked
	Week																			
Poll	Pre	1	2	3	4	5	6	7	8	9	10	11	12	13	14	15	16	17	18	Final
AP	—	—	—	—	—	—	—	—	—	—	—	—	—	—	—	—	—	—	—	Not released
Coaches	—	—	—	—	—	—	—	—	—	—	—	—	—	—	—	—	—	—	—	—

== See also ==
- 2021–22 Clemson Tigers women's basketball team
