= 2021–22 Boston College Eagles men's basketball team =

American college basketball season

2021–22 Boston College Eagles men's basketball
- Conference: Atlantic Coast Conference
- Record: 13–20 (6–14 ACC)
- Head coach: Earl Grant (1st season)
- Assistant coaches: Anthony Goins; Chris Markwood; Jim Molinari
- Home arena: Conte Forum

2021–22 ACC men's basketball standings
	Conf.				Overall
Team	W		L	PCT	W		L	PCT
No. 9 Duke	16	–	4	.800	32	–	7	.821
North Carolina	15	–	5	.750	29	–	10	.744
Notre Dame	15	–	5	.750	24	–	11	.686
Miami (FL)	14	–	6	.700	26	–	11	.703
Wake Forest	13	–	7	.650	25	–	10	.714
Virginia	12	–	8	.600	21	–	14	.600
Virginia Tech †	11	–	9	.550	23	–	13	.639
Florida State	10	–	10	.500	17	–	14	.548
Syracuse	9	–	11	.450	16	–	17	.485
Clemson	8	–	12	.400	17	–	16	.515
Louisville	6	–	14	.300	13	–	19	.406
Boston College	6	–	14	.300	13	–	20	.394
Pittsburgh	6	–	14	.300	11	–	21	.344
Georgia Tech	5	–	15	.250	12	–	20	.375
NC State	4	–	16	.200	11	–	21	.344
† 2022 ACC tournament winner Rankings from AP poll

The 2021–22 Boston College Eagles men's basketball team represented Boston College during the 2021–22 NCAA Division I men's basketball season. The Eagles, were led by first-year head coach Earl Grant, played their home games at the Conte Forum as members of the Atlantic Coast Conference.

The Eagles finished 13–20 overall and 6–14 in ACC play to finish in a three way tie for eleventh place. As the thirteenth seed in the ACC tournament, they defeated twelfth seed Pittsburgh in the first round and fifth seed Wake Forest in the second round before losing to fourth seed Miami in the quarterfinals. They were not invited to the NCAA tournament or the NIT.

== Previous season ==
The Eagles finished the 2020–21 season 4–16, 2–11 in ACC play to finish in last place. They lost to Duke in the first round of the ACC tournament.

Head coach Jim Christian was fired on February 15, 2021, after starting the season 3–13. Assistant Coach Scott Spinelli served as the interim head coach to finish the season. On March 15, the school named College of Charleston head coach Earl Grant the new coach for the Eagles.

== Offseason ==
=== Departures ===
Boston College Departures
Name	Number	Pos.	Height	Weight	Year	Hometown	Reason for departure
CJ Felder	1	F	6'7"	230	Sophomore	Sumter, South Carolina	Transferred to Florida
Jay Heath	5	G	6'3"	175	Sophomore	Washington, D.C.	Transferred to Arizona State
Wynston Tabbs	10	G	6'2"	193	Junior	Suitland, Maryland	Transferred to East Carolina
Andre Adams	12	F	6'9"	230	Graduate Student	Avondale, Arizona	Graduated
Luka Kraljević	13	F/C	6'10"	228	Senior	Domžale, Slovenia	Graduated
Kamari Williams	14	F	6'7"	200	Sophomore	Sandy Spring, Maryland	Transferred to Miami (OH)
Rich Kelly	22	G	6'1"	175	Graduate Student	Shelton, Connecticut	Transferred to UMass
Sam Holtze	30	G	5'10"	150	Senior	Manhattan Beach, California	Walk-on; graduated
Will Jackowitz	34	F	6'8"	205	Senior	Wellesley, Massachusetts	Graduated
Steffon Mitchell	41	F	6'8"	220	Senior	Shakopee, Minnesota	Graduated

=== Incoming transfers ===
Boston College incoming transfers
Name	Number	Pos.	Height	Weight	Year	Hometown	Previous school
T. J. Bickerstaff	1	F	6'9"	210	Junior	Atlanta, GA	Drexel
Quinten Post	12	F	7'0"	240	Junior	Amsterdam, NL	Mississippi State
Brevin Galloway	51	G	6'2"	200	Graduate Student	Anderson, SC	College of Charleston

=== 2021 recruiting class ===
College recruiting
Name	Hometown	School	Height	Weight	Commit date
Gianni Thompson; PF	Newton, Massachusetts	Brimmer and May School	6 ft 8 in (2.03 m)	205 lb (93 kg)	Jul 12, 2020
Gianni Thompson; PF	Recruit ratings: Rivals: 247Sports: ESPN:				
Kanye Jones; SG	Orlando, Florida	Windermere Preparatory School	6 ft 4 in (1.93 m)	170 lb (77 kg)	Mar 27, 2021
Kanye Jones; SG	Recruit ratings: Rivals:				
Devin McGlockton; PF	Cumming, Georgia	South Forsyth High School	6 ft 7 in (2.01 m)	221 lb (100 kg)	Mar 26, 2021
Devin McGlockton; PF	Recruit ratings: No ratings found				
Overall recruit ranking:
Note: In many cases, Scout, Rivals, 247Sports, On3, and ESPN may conflict in their listings of height and weight.; In these cases, the average was taken. ESPN grades are on a 100-point scale.; Sources: "Boston College Eagles". Rivals.; "Boston College 2021 Basketball Commits". Scout.; "Boston College Eagles". ESPN.; "Scout.com Team Recruiting Rankings". Scout.; "2021 Team Ranking". Rivals.

== Roster ==
2021–22 Boston College Eagles men's basketball team
Players
Coaches

Pos.	#	Name	Height	Weight	Year	Previous school	Hometown
G	0	Quinn Pemberton (W)	6 ft 1 in (1.85 m)	210 lb (95 kg)	So	Loyola Academy	Lake Forest, Illinois
F	1	T. J. Bickerstaff	6 ft 9 in (2.06 m)	210 lb (95 kg)	Jr	Sandy Creek	Atlanta, Georgia
G	3	Jaeden Zackery	6 ft 2 in (1.88 m)	200 lb (91 kg)	So	Chipola College	Salem, Wisconsin
G	4	Kanye Jones	6 ft 4 in (1.93 m)	170 lb (77 kg)	Fr	Windermere	Orlando, Florida
G	5	DeMarr Langford Jr.	6 ft 5 in (1.96 m)	195 lb (88 kg)	So	Brewster Academy	Worcester, Massachusetts
G	10	Abe Atiyeh	6 ft 0 in (1.83 m)	175 lb (79 kg)	So	Moravian Academy	Bethlehem, Pennsylvania
G	11	Makai Ashton-Langford	6 ft 3 in (1.91 m)	185 lb (84 kg)	GS	Providence	Worcester, Massachusetts
F	12	Quinten Post	7 ft 0 in (2.13 m)	240 lb (109 kg)	Jr	Mississippi State	Amsterdam, Netherlands
F	13	Frederick Scott	6 ft 8 in (2.03 m)	230 lb (104 kg)	GS	Rider	Munster, Indiana
F	21	Devin McGlockton	6 ft 7 in (2.01 m)	220 lb (100 kg)	Fr	South Forsyth	Cumming, Georgia
F	23	Andrew Kenny (W)	6 ft 6 in (1.98 m)	205 lb (93 kg)	Jr	Choate Rosemary Hall	Seattle, Washington
F	24	Gianni Thompson	6 ft 8 in (2.03 m)	205 lb (93 kg)	Fr	Brimmer and May	Newton, Massachusetts
G	25	Jonathan Noel (W)	6 ft 3 in (1.91 m)	195 lb (88 kg)	Jr	St. Mark's School	Everett, Massachusetts
C	32	Justin Vander Baan	7 ft 0 in (2.13 m)	230 lb (104 kg)	So	Whitinsville Christian	Northbridge, Massachusetts
F/C	33	James Karnik	6 ft 9 in (2.06 m)	230 lb (104 kg)	RS Sr	Lehigh	Surrey, British Columbia
G	51	Brevin Galloway	6 ft 2 in (1.88 m)	200 lb (91 kg)	GS	College of Charleston	Anderson, South Carolina

Head coach

- Earl Grant (Georgia College)

Assistant coach(es)

- Anthony Goins (St. John's)
- Chris Markwood (Maine)
- Jim Molinari (Illinois Wesleyan)

Legend

- (C) Team captain
- (S) Suspended
- (I) Ineligible
- (W) Walk-on
- Injured
- Current redshirt

Roster
Last update: September 15, 2021

== Schedule and results ==
Date time, TV	Rank^{#}	Opponent^{#}	Result	Record	High points	High rebounds	High assists	Site (attendance) city, state
Regular season
November 9, 2021*; 8:00 p.m., ACCNX		Dartmouth	W 73–57	1–0	16 – Langford	6 – Tied	3 – Ashton-Langford	Conte Forum (4,218); Chestnut Hill, MA
November 12, 2021*; 7:00 p.m., ACCNX		Holy Cross; Sunshine Slam Campus Game	W 85–55	2–0	20 – Langford	7 – Bickerstaff	3 – Karnik	Conte Forum (4,463); Chestnut Hill, MA
November 14, 2021*; 4:00 p.m., ACCNX		Fairfield	W 72–64	3–0	17 – Ashton-Langford	8 – Post	6 – Zackery	Conte Forum (3,903); Chestnut Hill, MA
November 17, 2021*; 7:00 p.m., CBSSN		at Rhode Island	L 49–57	3–1	22 – Bickerstaff	12 – Bickerstaff	5 – Ashton-Langford	Ryan Center (5,421); Kingston, RI
November 20, 2021*; 5:00 p.m., FloSports		vs. Utah; Sunshine Slam Semifinals	L 61–68	3–2	15 – Zackery	5 – Tied	3 – Ashton-Langford	Ocean Center (0); Daytona Beach, FL
November 21, 2021*; 5:00 p.m., FloSports		vs. Rhode Island; Sunshine Slam Consolation	L 65–71	3–3	19 – Zackery	13 – Karnik	4 – Langford	Ocean Center (0); Daytona Beach, FL
November 26, 2021*; 2:00 p.m., ACCNX		Columbia	W 73–60	4–3	15 – Langford	17 – Bickerstaff	2 – 3 tied	Conte Forum (4,077); Chestnut Hill, MA
November 29, 2021*; 7:00 p.m., ACCN		South Florida	W 64–49	5–3	12 – Karnik	8 – Bickerstaff	7 – Ashton-Langford	Conte Forum (3,718); Chestnut Hill, MA
December 3, 2021; 6:00 p.m., ACCN		Notre Dame	W 73–57	6–3 (1–0)	17 – Karnik	13 – Karnik	4 – Tied	Conte Forum (6,023); Chestnut Hill, MA
December 11, 2021*; 5:00 p.m., NBCSN		at Saint Louis	L 68–79	6–4	18 – Ashton-Langford	5 – Tied	5 – Zackery	Chaifetz Arena (6,123); St. Louis, MO
December 13, 2021*; 8:00 p.m., ACCN		Albany	L 57–61	6–5	15 – Zackery	11 – Bickerstaff	4 – Zackery	Conte Forum (3,872); Chestnut Hill, MA
January 2, 2022; 1:00 p.m., ESPN2		North Carolina	L 65–91	6–6 (1–1)	13 – Zackery	9 – Post	4 – Ashton-Langford	Conte Forum (5,561); Chestnut Hill, MA
January 8, 2022; 4:00 p.m., ACCN		at Pittsburgh	L 67–69	6–7 (1–2)	23 – Ashton-Langford	8 – Bickerstaff	4 – Ashton-Langford	Petersen Events Center (7,876); Pittsburgh, PA
January 12, 2022; 9:00 p.m., ACCRSN		Georgia Tech	L 76–81	6–8 (1–3)	24 – Post	9 – Post	5 – Zackery	Conte Forum (3,591); Chestnut Hill, MA
January 15, 2022; 6:30 p.m., ACCRSN		at Clemson	W 70–68	7–8 (2–3)	19 – Ashton-Langford	7 – Ashton-Langford	4 – Ashton-Langford	Littlejohn Coliseum (7,443); Clemson, SC
January 19, 2022; 7:00 p.m., ACCRSN		at Louisville	L 54–67	7–9 (2–4)	22 – Ashton-Langford	15 – Bickerstaff	4 – Zackery	KFC Yum! Center (12,123); Louisville, KY
January 22, 2022; 12:00 p.m., ACCRSN		Virginia Tech	W 68–63	8–9 (3–4)	26 – Karnik	9 – Tied	4 – Tied	Conte Forum (4,714); Chestnut Hill, MA
January 24, 2022; 6:00 p.m., ACCN		at Wake Forest; Rescheduled from December 22	L 57–87	8–10 (3–5)	13 – Post	8 – Bickerstaff	4 – Bickerstaff	LVJM Coliseum (4,928); Winston-Salem, NC
January 26, 2022; 7:00 p.m., ACCRSN		at North Carolina	L 47–58	8–11 (3–6)	10 – Post	17 – Bickerstaff	1 – 5 tied	Dean Smith Center (17,237); Chapel Hill, NC
January 30, 2022; 4:00 p.m., ACCN		Pittsburgh	W 69–56	9–11 (4–6)	21 – Ashton-Langford	10 – Post	4 – Zackery	Conte Forum (4,507); Chestnut Hill, MA
February 1, 2022; 6:00 p.m., ACCN		at Virginia	L 55–67	9–12 (4–7)	16 – Karnik	8 – Bickerstaff	2 – 3 tied	John Paul Jones Arena (12,847); Charlottesville, VA
February 8, 2022; 8:00 p.m., ACCN		Syracuse	L 64–73	9–13 (4–8)	18 – Zackery	14 – Post	6 – Tied	Conte Forum (5,666); Chestnut Hill, MA
February 12, 2022; 8:00 p.m., ACCN		No. 7 Duke	L 61–72	9–14 (4–9)	21 – Karnik	9 – Karnik	5 – Zackery	Conte Forum (8,606); Chestnut Hill, MA
February 16, 2022; 7:00 p.m., ESPNU		at Notre Dame	L 95–99 ^{OT}	9–15 (4–10)	23 – Langford	7 – Langford	5 – Ashton-Langford	Edmund P. Joyce Center (7,700); South Bend, IN
February 19, 2022; 12:00 p.m., ESPNU		at Syracuse	L 56–76	9–16 (4–11)	11 – Karnik	11 – Karnik	4 – Ashton-Langford	Carrier Dome (23,019); Syracuse, NY
February 21, 2022; 7:00 p.m., ACCN		at Florida State; Rescheduled from December 29	W 71–55	10–16 (5–11)	18 – Zackery	11 – Karnik	9 – Ashton-Langford	Conte Forum (5,441); Chestnut Hill, MA
February 23, 2022; 7:00 p.m., ACCRSN		at NC State	W 69–61	11–16 (6–11)	18 – Post	9 – Karnik	4 – Ashton-Langford	PNC Arena (11,282); Raleigh, NC
February 26, 2022; 3:00 p.m., ACCN		Clemson	L 60–70	11–17 (6–12)	17 – Karnik	11 – Langford	3 – Zackery	Conte Forum (6,316); Chestnut Hill, MA
March 2, 2022; 9:00 p.m., ACCN		Miami (FL)	L 70–81	11–18 (6–13)	21 – Ashton-Langford	7 – Karnik	4 – Langford	Conte Forum (4,045); Chestnut Hill, MA
March 5, 2022; 12:00 p.m., ACCRSN		at Georgia Tech	L 78–82 ^{OT}	11–19 (6–14)	19 – Zackery	8 – Langford	7 – Galloway	McCamish Pavilion (5,336); Atlanta, GA
ACC tournament
March 8, 2022; 2:00 p.m., ACCN	(13)	vs. (12) Pittsburgh; First round	W 66–46	12–19	13 – Karnik	5 – Langford	5 – Bickerstaff	Barclays Center (6,222); Brooklyn, NY
March 9, 2022; 2:30 p.m., ESPN	(13)	vs. (5) Wake Forest; Second round	W 82–77 ^{OT}	13–19	19 – Langford	7 – Tied	5 – Ashton-Langford	Barclays Center; Brooklyn, NY
March 10, 2022; 2:30 p.m., ESPN2	(13)	vs. (4) Miami; Quarterfinals	L 69–71 ^{OT}	13–20	14 – Post	7 – Langford	4 – Ashton-Langford	Barclays Center (11,511); Brooklyn, NY
*Non-conference game. ^{#}Rankings from AP Poll. (#) Tournament seedings in parentheses. All times are in Eastern Time.

== Rankings ==
Ranking movements Legend: — = Not ranked
	Week																			
Poll	Pre	1	2	3	4	5	6	7	8	9	10	11	12	13	14	15	16	17	18	Final
AP	—	—	—	—	—	—	—	—	—	—	—	—	—	—	—	—	—	—	—	Not released
Coaches	—	—	—	—	—	—	—	—	—	—	—	—	—	—	—	—	—	—	—	—

*AP does not release post-NCAA tournament rankings and the Coaches poll did not release a Week 1 poll.
