= 2021–22 Georgia Tech Yellow Jackets men's basketball team =

American college basketball season

2021–22 Georgia Tech Yellow Jackets men's basketball
- Conference: Atlantic Coast Conference
- Record: 12–20 (5–15 ACC)
- Head coach: Josh Pastner (6th season)
- Associate head coach: Eric Reveno
- Assistant coaches: Julian Swartz; Anthony Wilkins
- Home arena: McCamish Pavilion

2021–22 ACC men's basketball standings
| | Conf. | | | | Overall |
| Team | W | | L | PCT | W | | L | PCT |
|---|---|---|---|---|---|---|---|---|
| No. 9 Duke | 16 | – | 4 | .800 | 32 | – | 7 | .821 |
| North Carolina | 15 | – | 5 | .750 | 29 | – | 10 | .744 |
| Notre Dame | 15 | – | 5 | .750 | 24 | – | 11 | .686 |
| Miami (FL) | 14 | – | 6 | .700 | 26 | – | 11 | .703 |
| Wake Forest | 13 | – | 7 | .650 | 25 | – | 10 | .714 |
| Virginia | 12 | – | 8 | .600 | 21 | – | 14 | .600 |
| Virginia Tech † | 11 | – | 9 | .550 | 23 | – | 13 | .639 |
| Florida State | 10 | – | 10 | .500 | 17 | – | 14 | .548 |
| Syracuse | 9 | – | 11 | .450 | 16 | – | 17 | .485 |
| Clemson | 8 | – | 12 | .400 | 17 | – | 16 | .515 |
| Louisville | 6 | – | 14 | .300 | 13 | – | 19 | .406 |
| Boston College | 6 | – | 14 | .300 | 13 | – | 20 | .394 |
| Pittsburgh | 6 | – | 14 | .300 | 11 | – | 21 | .344 |
| Georgia Tech | 5 | – | 15 | .250 | 12 | – | 20 | .375 |
| NC State | 4 | – | 16 | .200 | 11 | – | 21 | .344 |
† 2022 ACC tournament winner Rankings from AP poll

The 2021–22 Georgia Tech Yellow Jackets men's basketball team represented the Georgia Institute of Technology during the 2021–22 NCAA Division I men's basketball season. They were led by sixth-year head coach Josh Pastner and played their home games at Hank McCamish Pavilion as members of the Atlantic Coast Conference.

The Yellow Jackets finished the season 12–20 overall and 5–15 in ACC play to finish in fourteenth place. As the fourteenth seed in the ACC tournament, they lost to Louisville in the first round. They were not invited to the NCAA tournament or the NIT.

== Previous season ==
In a season limited due to the ongoing COVID-19 pandemic, the Yellow Jackets finished the 2021–21 season 17–9, 11–6 in ACC play to finish in fourth place. They defeated Miami in the quarterfinals of the ACC tournament and advanced to the championship game after Virginia was forced to withdraw from the tournament after a positive COVID-19 test. They defeated Florida State to win the tournament championship. As a result, they received the conference's automatic bid to the NCAA tournament as the No. 9 seed in the Midwest region. They lost in the first round to Loyola. It was the first time since 2010 that the Yellow Jackets had participated in the NCAA Tournament, and their first ACC Championship since 1993.

== Offseason ==
=== Departures ===
Departures
| Name | Number | Pos. | Height | Weight | Year | Hometown | Reason for departure |
|---|---|---|---|---|---|---|---|
| Moses Wright | 5 | F | 6'9" | 233 | Senior | Raleigh, NC | Graduated |
| Jose Alvarado | 10 | G | 6'0" | 179 | Senior | Brooklyn, NY | Graduated/undrafted in 2021 NBA draft |
| David Didenko | 14 | F | 6'9" | 232 | Junior | Yakutsk, Russia | Transferred to UT Martin |
| Niko Broadway | 34 | G | 6'3" | 195 | Sophomore | Atlanta, GA | Walk-on; didn't return |
| Shaheed Medlock | 45 | G | 6'5" | 196 | Senior | Waycross, GA | Graduate transferred to DePaul |
| Malachi Rice | 55 | G | 6'0" | 186 | Senior | Indianapolis, IN | Walk-on; graduated |

=== Incoming transfers ===
Incoming transfers
| Name | Number | Pos. | Height | Weight | Year | Hometown | Previous school |
|---|---|---|---|---|---|---|---|
| Deivon Smith | 5 | G | 6'1" | 172 | Sophomore | Loganville, GA | Mississippi State |

=== 2021 recruiting class ===
College recruiting information
| Name | Hometown | School | Height | Weight | Commit date |
|---|---|---|---|---|---|
| Dallan Coleman #10 SG | Callahan, FL | West Nassau High School | 6 ft 4 in (1.93 m) | 185 lb (84 kg) | Oct 28, 2020 |
| Dallan Coleman #10 SG | Recruit ratings: Scout: Rivals: 247Sports: ESPN: (86) | | | | |
| Miles Kelly #28 SF | Lilburn, GA | Parkview High School | 6 ft 5 in (1.96 m) | 165 lb (75 kg) | Sep 25, 2020 |
| Miles Kelly #28 SF | Recruit ratings: Scout: Rivals: 247Sports: ESPN: (80) | | | | |
| Jalon Moore #36 SF | Gardendale, AL | Gardendale High School | 6 ft 6 in (1.98 m) | 200 lb (91 kg) | Sep 25, 2020 |
| Jalon Moore #36 SF | Recruit ratings: Scout: Rivals: 247Sports: ESPN: (78) | | | | |
Overall recruit ranking:
Note: In many cases, Scout, Rivals, 247Sports, On3, and ESPN may conflict in their listings of height and weight.; In these cases, the average was taken. ESPN grades are on a 100-point scale.; Sources: "2021 Georgia Tech Commits". Rivals.; "Georgia Tech 2021 Basketball Commits". Scout.; "Georgia Tech Yellow Jackets". ESPN.; "Scout.com Team Recruiting Rankings". Scout.; "2021 Team Ranking". Rivals.

== Roster ==
2021–22 Georgia Tech Yellow Jackets men's basketball team
Players
Coaches

| Pos. | # | Name | Height | Weight | Year | Previous school | Hometown |
|---|---|---|---|---|---|---|---|
| G | 0 | Michael Devoe | 6 ft 5 in (1.96 m) | 191 lb (87 kg) | Sr | Montverde Academy | Orlando, FL |
| G | 1 | Kyle Sturdivant | 6 ft 2 in (1.88 m) | 197 lb (89 kg) | Jr | Norcross HS; Southern California | Norcross, GA |
| C | 2 | Saba Gigiberia | 7 ft 1 in (2.16 m) | 248 lb (112 kg) | So | Prolific Preparatory School | Tbilisi, Georgia |
| G | 3 | Bubba Parham | 5 ft 10 in (1.78 m) | 161 lb (73 kg) | GS | Brookwood HS; VMI | Snellville, GA |
| G/F | 4 | Jordan Usher | 6 ft 7 in (2.01 m) | 220 lb (100 kg) | GS | Wheeler HS; Southern California | Canton, GA |
| G | 5 | Deivon Smith | 6 ft 1 in (1.85 m) | 172 lb (78 kg) | So | Grayson HS; Mississippi State | Loganville, GA |
| G | 10 | Dallan Coleman | 6 ft 6 in (1.98 m) | 215 lb (98 kg) | Fr | West Nassau HS | Memphis, TN |
| G | 11 | Tristan Maxwell | 6 ft 2 in (1.88 m) | 209 lb (95 kg) | So | North Mecklenburg HS | Huntersville, NC |
| F | 12 | Khalid Moore | 6 ft 7 in (2.01 m) | 208 lb (94 kg) | Sr | Archbishop Molloy HS | Briarwood, NY |
| G | 13 | Miles Kelly | 6 ft 5 in (1.96 m) | 171 lb (78 kg) | Fr | Parkview HS | Lilburn, GA |
| F | 14 | Jalon Moore | 6 ft 6 in (1.98 m) | 211 lb (96 kg) | Fr | Gardendale HS | Gardendale, AL |
| F | 23 | Jordan Meka | 6 ft 8 in (2.03 m) | 225 lb (102 kg) | So | Mount Bethel Christian Academy | Yaoundé, Cameroon |
| C | 24 | Rodney Howard | 6 ft 10 in (2.08 m) | 246 lb (112 kg) | Jr | Legacy Charter School; Georgia | Ypsilanti, MI |
| G | 30 | Coleman Boyd (W) | 6 ft 1 in (1.85 m) | 178 lb (81 kg) | Jr | Mount Bethel Christian Academy | Smyrna, GA |
| G | 33 | Brayden Daniels (W) | 6 ft 4 in (1.93 m) | 176 lb (80 kg) | Fr | Christian Academy | Louisville, KY |
| F | 35 | Jehloni James (W) | 6 ft 6 in (1.98 m) | 192 lb (87 kg) | Jr | Lanier HS | Sugar Hill, GA |
| F | 43 | Jermontae Hill (W) | 6 ft 6 in (1.98 m) | 198 lb (90 kg) | Fr | DME Academy | Tucker, GA |

Head coach

- Josh Pastner (Arizona)

Assistant coach(es)

- Eric Reveno (Stanford)
- Julian Swartz (Carroll)
- Anthony Wilkins (Kent State)

Legend

- (C) Team captain
- (S) Suspended
- (I) Ineligible
- (W) Walk-on
- Injured
- Current redshirt

Roster

== Schedule and results ==
| Date time, TV | Rank^{#} | Opponent^{#} | Result | Record | High points | High rebounds | High assists | Site (attendance) city, state |
Exhibition
| October 31, 2021*; 2:00 p.m. | | Morehouse | W 89–52 | – | 23 – Devoe | 6 – Tied | 8 – Smith | McCamish Pavilion (3,585); Atlanta, GA |
Regular season
| November 9, 2021*; 7:30 p.m., ACCNX | | Miami (OH); Georgia Tech Showcase | L 69–72 | 0–1 | 26 – Devoe | 13 – Howard | 3 – Tied | McCamish Pavilion (4,221); Atlanta, GA |
| November 12, 2021*; 7:30 p.m., ACCNX | | Stetson; Georgia Tech Showcase | W 77–52 | 1–1 | 17 – Devoe | 11 – Usher | 7 – Devoe | McCamish Pavilion (4,802); Atlanta, GA |
| November 15, 2021*; 7:30 p.m., ACCNX | | Lamar; Georgia Tech Showcase | W 75–66 | 2–1 | 19 – Coleman | 8 – Tied | 6 – Devoe | McCamish Pavilion (3,625); Atlanta, GA |
| November 19, 2021*; 9:00 p.m., SECN | | at Georgia; Rivalry | W 88–78 | 3–1 | 37 – Devoe | 7 – Tied | 5 – Devoe | Stegeman Coliseum (9,057); Athens, GA |
| November 22, 2021*; 7:00 p.m., ACCN | | Charleston Southern | W 85–70 | 4–1 | 24 – Usher | 10 – Usher | 3 – 4 tied | McCamish Pavilion (3,912); Atlanta, GA |
| November 26, 2021*; 12:00 p.m., ACCRSN | | Georgia Southern | W 61–59 | 5–1 | 26 – Devoe | 10 – Usher | 5 – Devoe | McCamish Pavilion (4,486); Atlanta, GA |
| December 1, 2021*; 9:15 p.m., ESPN2 | | No. 23 Wisconsin; ACC–Big Ten Challenge | L 66–70 | 5–2 | 33 – Devoe | 11 – Smith | 4 – Sturdivant | McCamish Pavilion (6,302); Atlanta, GA |
| December 5, 2021; 3:00 p.m., ESPN | | North Carolina | L 62–79 | 5–3 (0–1) | 15 – Devoe | 4 – Devoe | 4 – Smith | McCamish Pavilion (6,217); Atlanta, GA |
| December 11, 2021*; 6:00 p.m., ESPN2 | | vs. No. 25 LSU; Holiday Hoopsgiving | L 53–69 | 5–4 | 15 – Usher | 6 – Usher | 3 – Devoe | State Farm Arena (6,137); Atlanta, GA |
| December 18, 2021*; 4:00 p.m., P12N | | vs. No. 10 USC; Jerry Colangelo Classic | L 53–67 | 5–5 | 25 – Devoe | 8 – Moore | 2 – Moore | Footprint Center (7,821); Phoenix, AZ |
| December 21, 2021*; 9:00 p.m., ACCRSN | | Georgia State | W 72–62 ^{OT} | 6–5 | 30 – Usher | 11 – Usher | 3 – Devoe | McCamish Pavilion (4,228); Atlanta, GA |
| December 23, 2021*; 7:00 p.m., ACCN | | Alabama A&M | Canceled due to COVID-19 issues | | | | | McCamish Pavilion; Atlanta, GA |
| January 1, 2022; 2:00 p.m., ACCN | | Louisville | L 64–67 | 6–6 (0–2) | 23 – Devoe | 6 – Usher | 4 – Usher | McCamish Pavilion (4,853); Atlanta, GA |
| January 4, 2022; 9:00 p.m., ACCN | | at No. 2 Duke | L 57–69 | 6–7 (0–3) | 21 – Devoe | 8 – Meka | 3 – Parham | Cameron Indoor Stadium (9,314); Chapel Hill, NC |
| January 8, 2022; 6:00 p.m., ACCN | | Notre Dame | L 68–72 ^{OT} | 6–8 (0–4) | 20 – Devoe | 14 – Usher | 6 – Usher | McCamish Pavilion (5,813); Atlanta, GA |
| January 12, 2022; 7:00 p.m., ACCRSN | | at Boston College | W 81–76 | 7–8 (1–4) | 22 – Maxwell | 9 – Devoe | 4 – Tied | Conte Forum (3,591); Chestnut Hill, MA |
| January 15, 2022; 8:00 p.m., ACCN | | at North Carolina | L 65–88 | 7–9 (1–5) | 22 – Usher | 7 – Usher | 3 – Usher | Dean Smith Center (18,568); Chapel Hill, NC |
| January 19, 2022; 7:00 p.m., ESPNU | | Wake Forest | L 64–80 | 7–10 (1–6) | 22 – Devoe | 5 – Usher | 3 – 3 tied | McCamish Pavilion (4,698); Atlanta, GA |
| January 23, 2022*; 5:00 p.m., ACCNX | | Clayton State | W 103–53 | 8–10 | 20 – Devoe | 6 – Devoe | 7 – Devoe | McCamish Pavilion (4,127); Atlanta, GA |
| January 26, 2022; 9:00 p.m., ACCN | | Florida State | W 75–61 | 9–10 (2–6) | 19 – Usher | 8 – Usher | 5 – Usher | McCamish Pavilion (4,967); Atlanta, GA |
| January 29, 2022; 12:00 p.m., ACCRSN | | Miami (FL) | L 62–73 | 9–11 (2–7) | 19 – Moore | 10 – Usher | 6 – Usher | McCamish Pavilion (5,135); Atlanta, GA |
| February 2, 2022; 9:00 p.m., ACCN | | at Virginia Tech | L 66–81 | 9–12 (2–8) | 30 – Devoe | 6 – Howard | 3 – Sturdivant | Cassell Coliseum (6,887); Blacksburg, VA |
| February 5, 2022; 2:00 p.m., ACCRSN | | Clemson | W 69–64 | 10–12 (3–8) | 16 – Smith | 8 – Smith | 6 – Smith | McCamish Pavilion (5,784); Atlanta, GA |
| February 9, 2022; 7:00 p.m., ACCRSN | | at Miami (FL) | L 70–79 | 10–13 (3–9) | 20 – Devoe | 7 – Tied | 4 – Sturdivant | Watsco Center (3,866); Coral Gables, FL |
| February 12, 2022; 4:00 p.m., ESPN2 | | at Virginia | L 53–63 | 10–14 (3–10) | 17 – Devoe | 5 – Usher | 5 – Usher | John Paul Jones Arena (14,253); Charlottesville, VA |
| February 15, 2022; 8:00 p.m., ACCN | | NC State | L 61–76 | 10–15 (3–11) | 18 – Devoe | 11 – Howard | 4 – Devoe | McCamish Pavilion (4,568); Atlanta, GA |
| February 19, 2022; 7:00 p.m., ACCN | | at Pittsburgh | W 68–62 | 11–15 (4–11) | 22 – Devoe | 8 – Usher | 5 – Tied | Petersen Events Center (9,085); Pittsburgh, PA |
| February 21, 2022; 7:00 p.m., ACCRSN | | at Syracuse; Rescheduled from December 29 | L 73–74 ^{OT} | 11–16 (4–12) | 19 – Howard | 13 – Usher | 5 – Usher | Carrier Dome (22,042); Syracuse, NY |
| February 23, 2022; 9:00 p.m., ACCN | | Virginia Tech | L 58–62 | 11–17 (4–13) | 18 – Devoe | 5 – Tied | 3 – Devoe | McCamish Pavilion (4,150); Atlanta, GA |
| February 26, 2022; 5:00 p.m., ACCN | | at Notre Dame | L 56–90 | 11–18 (4–14) | 16 – Usher | 8 – Howard | 4 – Devoe | Edmund P. Joyce Center (9,149); South Bend, IN |
| March 2, 2022; 7:00 p.m., ACCN | | at Clemson | L 65–68 | 11–19 (4–15) | 15 – Devoe | 7 – Devoe | 5 – Sturdivant | Littlejohn Coliseum (5,602); Clemson, SC |
| March 5, 2022; 12:00 p.m., ACCRSN | | Boston College | W 82–78 ^{OT} | 12–19 (5–15) | 30 – Usher | 8 – Tied | 5 – Usher | McCamish Pavilion (5,336); Atlanta, GA |
ACC tournament
| March 8, 2022; 7:00 p.m., ACCN | (14) | vs. (11) Louisville; First round | L 74–84 | 12–20 | 19 – Usher | 6 – Usher | 9 – Usher | Barclays Center (6,222); Brooklyn, NY |
*Non-conference game. ^{#}Rankings from AP Poll. (#) Tournament seedings in parentheses. All times are in Eastern Time.

== Rankings ==
Ranking movements
| | Week | | | | | | | | | | | | | | | | | | | |
| Poll | Pre | 1 | 2 | 3 | 4 | 5 | 6 | 7 | 8 | 9 | 10 | 11 | 12 | 13 | 14 | 15 | 16 | 17 | 18 | Final |
|---|---|---|---|---|---|---|---|---|---|---|---|---|---|---|---|---|---|---|---|---|
| AP | | | | | | | | | | | | | | | | | | | | Not released |
| Coaches | | | | | | | | | | | | | | | | | | | | |

*AP does not release post-NCAA Tournament rankings and the Coaches Poll did not release a Week 1 poll.
