= 2021–22 NC State Wolfpack men's basketball team =

American college basketball season

2021–22 NC State Wolfpack men's basketball
- Conference: Atlantic Coast Conference
- Record: 11–21 (4–16 ACC)
- Head coach: Kevin Keatts (5th season)
- Assistant coaches: James Johnson; Roy Roberson; Mike Summey
- Home arena: PNC Arena

2021–22 ACC men's basketball standings
| | Conf. | | | | Overall |
| Team | W | | L | PCT | W | | L | PCT |
|---|---|---|---|---|---|---|---|---|
| No. 9 Duke | 16 | – | 4 | .800 | 32 | – | 7 | .821 |
| North Carolina | 15 | – | 5 | .750 | 29 | – | 10 | .744 |
| Notre Dame | 15 | – | 5 | .750 | 24 | – | 11 | .686 |
| Miami (FL) | 14 | – | 6 | .700 | 26 | – | 11 | .703 |
| Wake Forest | 13 | – | 7 | .650 | 25 | – | 10 | .714 |
| Virginia | 12 | – | 8 | .600 | 21 | – | 14 | .600 |
| Virginia Tech † | 11 | – | 9 | .550 | 23 | – | 13 | .639 |
| Florida State | 10 | – | 10 | .500 | 17 | – | 14 | .548 |
| Syracuse | 9 | – | 11 | .450 | 16 | – | 17 | .485 |
| Clemson | 8 | – | 12 | .400 | 17 | – | 16 | .515 |
| Louisville | 6 | – | 14 | .300 | 13 | – | 19 | .406 |
| Boston College | 6 | – | 14 | .300 | 13 | – | 20 | .394 |
| Pittsburgh | 6 | – | 14 | .300 | 11 | – | 21 | .344 |
| Georgia Tech | 5 | – | 15 | .250 | 12 | – | 20 | .375 |
| NC State | 4 | – | 16 | .200 | 11 | – | 21 | .344 |
† 2022 ACC tournament winner Rankings from AP poll

The 2021–22 NC State Wolfpack men's basketball team represented North Carolina State University during the 2021–22 NCAA Division I men's basketball season. The Wolfpack were led by fifth-year head coach Kevin Keatts and played their home games at PNC Arena in Raleigh, North Carolina as members of the Atlantic Coast Conference (ACC).

The Wolfpack finished the season 11–21 overall and 4–16 in ACC play to finish in fifteenth place. As the fifteenth seed in the ACC tournament, they lost to Clemson in the first round. They were not invited to the NCAA tournament or the NIT.

== Previous season ==
In a season limited due to the ongoing COVID-19 pandemic, the Wolfpack finished the 2020–21 season 14–11, 9–8 in ACC play, to finish in ninth place. In the ACC tournament, they lost to Syracuse in the first round. They received an at-large bid to the National Invitation Tournament as the third seed in the Colorado State bracket. The Wolfpack defeated Davidson in the first round before losing to Colorado State in the quarterfinals.

== Offseason ==
=== Departures ===
Departures
| Name | Number | Pos. | Height | Weight | Year | Hometown | Reason for departure |
|---|---|---|---|---|---|---|---|
| D. J. Funderburk | 0 | F | 6'10" | 225 | RS Senior | Cleveland, OH | Graduated |
| Shakeel Moore | 2 | G | 6'1" | 180 | Freshman | Greensboro, NC | Transferred to Mississippi State |
| Braxton Beverly | 10 | G | 6'0" | 185 | Senior | Hazard, KY | Graduate transferred to Eastern Kentucky |
| Max Farthing | 22 | G | 6'7" | 210 | Sophomore | Raleigh, NC | Walk-on; transferred to Grand Valley State |
| Devon Daniels | 24 | G | 6'5" | 200 | RS Senior | Battle Creek, MI | Graduated |
| Nick Farrar | 30 | F | 6'6" | 260 | Freshman | Apex, NC | Transferred to College of Charleston |

=== Incoming transfers ===
Incoming transfers
| Name | Number | Pos. | Height | Weight | Year | Hometown | Previous school |
|---|---|---|---|---|---|---|---|
| Casey Morsell | 14 | G | 6'3" | 200 | Junior | Fort Washington, MD | Virginia |
| Greg Gantt | 23 | F | 6'8" | 215 | Junior | Fayetteville, NC | Providence |

=== 2021 recruiting class ===
College recruiting information
| Name | Hometown | School | Height | Weight | Commit date |
|---|---|---|---|---|---|
| Ernest Ross #17 PF | Alachua, FL | Santa Fe High School | 6 ft 9 in (2.06 m) | 205 lb (93 kg) | Apr 26, 2020 |
| Ernest Ross #17 PF | Recruit ratings: Scout: Rivals: 247Sports: ESPN: (84) | | | | |
| Terquavion Smith #24 SG | Farmville, NC | Farmville Central High School | 6 ft 3 in (1.91 m) | 175 lb (79 kg) | Feb 18, 2019 |
| Terquavion Smith #24 SG | Recruit ratings: Scout: Rivals: 247Sports: ESPN: (82) | | | | |
| Breon Pass #51 PG | Reidsville, NC | Reidsville High School | 5 ft 11 in (1.80 m) | 160 lb (73 kg) | Sep 26, 2020 |
| Breon Pass #51 PG | Recruit ratings: Scout: Rivals: 247Sports: ESPN: (74) | | | | |
Overall recruit ranking:
Note: In many cases, Scout, Rivals, 247Sports, On3, and ESPN may conflict in their listings of height and weight.; In these cases, the average was taken. ESPN grades are on a 100-point scale.; Sources: "2021 Team Ranking". Rivals.

== Roster ==
2021–22 NC State Wolfpack men's basketball team
Players
Coaches

| Pos. | # | Name | Height | Weight | Year | Previous school | Hometown |
|---|---|---|---|---|---|---|---|
| G | 0 | Terquavion Smith | 6 ft 4 in (1.93 m) | 160 lb (73 kg) | Fr | Farmville Central | Greenville, NC |
| G | 1 | Dereon Seabron | 6 ft 7 in (2.01 m) | 180 lb (82 kg) | RS So | Lake Taylor | Norfolk, VA |
| G | 3 | Cam Hayes | 6 ft 3 in (1.91 m) | 180 lb (82 kg) | So | Greensboro Day School | Greensboro, NC |
| F | 4 | Jericole Hellems | 6 ft 7 in (2.01 m) | 200 lb (91 kg) | Sr | Chaminade | St. Louis, MO |
| G | 5 | Thomas Allen | 6 ft 1 in (1.85 m) | 175 lb (79 kg) | RS Sr | Brewster Academy | Raleigh, NC |
| G | 10 | Breon Pass | 6 ft 0 in (1.83 m) | 175 lb (79 kg) | Fr | Reidsville | Reidsville, NC |
| F | 11 | Jaylon Gibson | 6 ft 10 in (2.08 m) | 220 lb (100 kg) | So | Grace Christian | Zebulon, NC |
| G | 12 | Chase Graham (W) | 6 ft 1 in (1.85 m) | 180 lb (82 kg) | Jr | Athens Drive | Raleigh, NC |
| G | 14 | Casey Morsell | 6 ft 3 in (1.91 m) | 200 lb (91 kg) | Jr | St. John's College; Virginia | Fort Washington, MD |
| F | 15 | Manny Bates (injured) | 6 ft 11 in (2.11 m) | 230 lb (104 kg) | RS Jr | Northwood Temple Academy | Fayetteville, NC |
| G | 20 | Alex Nunnally (W) | 6 ft 2 in (1.88 m) | 180 lb (82 kg) | Fr | Cary Academy | Cary, NC |
| F | 21 | Ebenezer Dowuona | 6 ft 11 in (2.11 m) | 225 lb (102 kg) | So | The Heritage School (GA) | Accra, Ghana |
| F | 23 | Greg Gantt | 6 ft 8 in (2.03 m) | 215 lb (98 kg) | Jr | Trinity Christian School; Providence | Fayetteville, NC |
| F | 24 | Ernest Ross | 6 ft 9 in (2.06 m) | 190 lb (86 kg) | Fr | Santa Fe | Alachua, FL |

Head coach

- Kevin Keatts (Ferrum)

Assistant coach(es)

- James Johnson (Ferrum)
- Roy Roberson (Lynchburg)
- Mike Summey (NC State)

Legend

- (C) Team captain
- (S) Suspended
- (I) Ineligible
- (W) Walk-on
- Injured
- Current redshirt

Roster
Last update: 2024-05-17

== Schedule and results ==
| Date time, TV | Rank^{#} | Opponent^{#} | Result | Record | High points | High rebounds | High assists | Site (attendance) city, state |
Exhibition
| November 1, 2021*; 7:00 p.m. | | Elizabeth City State | W 87–68 | – | 16 – Hellems | 6 – Seabron | 5 – Hayes | PNC Arena; Raleigh, NC |
Regular season
| November 9, 2021*; 8:00 p.m., ACCNX/ESPN+ | | Bucknell | W 88–70 | 1–0 | 22 – Hellems | 12 – Seabron | 4 – Hayes | PNC Arena (13,131); Raleigh, NC |
| November 13, 2021*; 2:00 p.m., ACCNX/ESPN+ | | Colgate | W 77–74 | 2–0 | 22 – Morsell | 10 – Seabron | 4 – Seabron | PNC Arena (11,949); Raleigh, NC |
| November 16, 2021*; 8:00 p.m., FloSports | | vs. Central Connecticut; Basketball Hall of Fame Showcase | W 79–65 | 3–0 | 24 – Seabron | 9 – Seabron | 5 – Smith | Mohegan Sun Arena (1,000); Uncasville, CT |
| November 17, 2021*; 8:00 p.m., CBSSN | | vs. Oklahoma State; Basketball Hall of Fame Showcase | L 68–74 | 3–1 | 19 – Seabron | 10 – Seabron | 3 – Seabron | Mohegan Sun Arena (1,500); Uncasville, CT |
| November 21, 2021*; 6:00 p.m., ACC RSN | | Texas Southern | W 65–57 | 4–1 | 21 – Seabron | 11 – Seabron | 5 – Hayes | PNC Arena (11,806); Raleigh, NC |
| November 27, 2021*; 2:00 p.m., ACCNX/ESPN+ | | Louisiana Tech | W 90–81 | 5–1 | 31 – Hellems | 7 – Seabron | 5 – Tied | PNC Arena (10,919); Raleigh, NC |
| December 1, 2021*; 7:15 p.m., ESPNU | | Nebraska; ACC–Big Ten Challenge | W 104–100 ^{4OT} | 6–1 | 39 – Seabron | 18 – Seabron | 4 – Hellems | PNC Arena (11,562); Raleigh, NC |
| December 4, 2021; 2:00 p.m., ESPN2 | | Louisville | L 68–73 | 6–2 (0–1) | 18 – Hellems | 9 – Seabron | 5 – Hellems | PNC Arena (13,029); Raleigh, NC |
| December 9, 2021*; 6:30 p.m., ACC RSN | | Bethune–Cookman | W 65–48 | 7–2 | 16 – Seabron | 13 – Seabron | 5 – Hellems | Reynolds Coliseum (5,429); Raleigh, NC |
| December 12, 2021*; 2:00 p.m., BTN | | vs. No. 1 Purdue; Basketball Hall of Fame Invitational | L 72–82 ^{OT} | 7–3 | 21 – Smith | 6 – Seabron | 4 – Seabron | Barclays Center (0); Brooklyn, NY |
| December 17, 2021*; 6:30 p.m., ACCN | | vs. Richmond; Basketball Hall of Fame Shootout | L 74–83 | 7–4 | 21 – Seabron | 13 – Seabron | 3 – Tied | Spectrum Center (0); Charlotte, NC |
| December 21, 2021*; 7:00 p.m., ACCNX | | Wright State | L 70–84 | 7–5 | 27 – Smith | 8 – Dowuona | 3 – Tied | PNC Arena (11,344); Raleigh, NC |
| December 29, 2021; 9:00 p.m., ESPNU | | at Miami (FL) | L 83–91 | 7–6 (0–2) | 24 – Hellems | 11 – Seabron | 6 – Seabron | Watsco Center (3,014); Coral Gables, FL |
| January 1, 2022; 4:00 p.m., ACCN | | Florida State | L 81–83 | 7–7 (0–3) | 32 – Seabron | 7 – Seabron | 7 – Seabron | PNC Arena (12,529); Raleigh, NC |
| January 4, 2022; 7:00 p.m., ACCN | | at Virginia Tech | W 68–63 | 8–7 (1–3) | 21 – Seabron | 10 – Seabron | 3 – Tied | Cassell Coliseum (5,148); Blacksburg, VA |
| January 8, 2022; 12:00 p.m., ACC RSN | | Clemson | L 65–70 | 8–8 (1–4) | 27 – Seabron | 7 – Tied | 3 – Seabron | PNC Arena (13,425); Raleigh, NC |
| January 12, 2022; 9:00 p.m., ACCN | | at Louisville | W 79–63 | 9–8 (2–4) | 24 – Smith | 7 – Seabron | 5 – Seabron | KFC Yum! Center (11,973); Louisville, KY |
| January 15, 2022; 2:00 p.m., ABC | | at No. 8 Duke | L 73–88 | 9–9 (2–5) | 19 – Smith | 10 – Seabron | 3 – Allen | Cameron Indoor Stadium (9,314); Durham, NC |
| January 19, 2022; 7:00 p.m., ACCN | | Virginia Tech | L 59–62 | 9–10 (2–6) | 15 – Hellems | 5 – Tied | 4 – Seabron | PNC Arena (13,286); Raleigh, NC |
| January 22, 2022; 6:00 p.m., ACCN | | Virginia | W 77–63 | 10–10 (3–6) | 21 – Hellems | 7 – Morsell | 5 – Seabron | PNC Arena (12,811); Raleigh, NC |
| January 26, 2022; 9:00 p.m., ACC RSN | | at Notre Dame | L 65–73 | 10–11 (3–7) | 21 – Seabron | 8 – Seabron | 2 – 3 tied | Edmund P. Joyce Center (6,881); South Bend, IN |
| January 29, 2022; 2:00 p.m., ACCN | | at North Carolina; Rivalry | L 80–100 | 10–12 (3–8) | 34 – Smith | 7 – Hellems | 3 – Hayes | Dean Smith Center (21,750); Chapel Hill, NC |
| February 2, 2022; 9:00 p.m., ESPN2 | | Syracuse | L 82–89 | 10–13 (3–9) | 25 – Smith | 8 – Seabron | 5 – Seabron | PNC Arena (12,634); Raleigh, NC |
| February 5, 2022; 3:00 p.m., ACCN | | Notre Dame | L 57–69 | 10–14 (3–10) | 19 – Smith | 9 – Seabron | 3 – Seabron | PNC Arena (13,690); Raleigh, NC |
| February 9, 2022; 7:00 p.m., ACCN | | Wake Forest; Rivalry | L 51–69 | 10–15 (3–11) | 22 – Seabron | 11 – Gibson | 4 – Smith | PNC Arena (11,635); Raleigh, NC |
| February 12, 2022; 3:00 p.m., ACCN | | at Pittsburgh | L 69–71 | 10–16 (3–12) | 17 – Seabron | 7 – Smith | 6 – Smith | Petersen Events Center (8,027); Pittsburgh, PA |
| February 15, 2022; 8:00 p.m., ACCN | | at Georgia Tech | W 76–61 | 11–16 (4–12) | 26 – Smith | 10 – Seabron | 3 – Smith | McCamish Pavilion (4,568); Atlanta, GA |
| February 23, 2022; 7:00 p.m., ACC RSN | | Boston College | L 61–69 | 11–17 (4–13) | 21 – Smith | 7 – Tied | 2 – 3 tied | PNC Arena (11,282); Raleigh, NC |
| February 26, 2022; 2:00 p.m., ESPN | | North Carolina; Rivalry | L 74–84 | 11–18 (4–14) | 20 – Smith | 5 – Smith | 2 – 3 tied | PNC Arena (16,704); Raleigh, NC |
| March 2, 2022; 9:00 p.m., ACC RSN | | at Wake Forest; Rivalry | L 76–101 | 11–19 (4–15) | 22 – Smith | 7 – Morsell | 4 – Smith | LJVM Coliseum (6,917); Winston-Salem, NC |
| March 5, 2022; 2:00 p.m., ESPN2 | | at Florida State | L 76–89 | 11–20 (4–16) | 30 – Smith | 8 – Gibson | 5 – Seabron | Donald L. Tucker Civic Center (8,845); Tallahassee, FL |
ACC Tournament
| March 8, 2022; 4:30 p.m., ACCN | (15) | vs. (10) Clemson; First round | L 64–70 | 11–21 | 19 – Seabron | 12 – Seabron | 6 – Seabron | Barclays Center (6,222); Brooklyn, NY |
*Non-conference game. ^{#}Rankings from AP poll. (#) Tournament seedings in parentheses. All times are in Eastern Time.

== Rankings ==
Ranking movements
| | Week | | | | | | | | | | | | | | | | | | | |
| Poll | Pre | 1 | 2 | 3 | 4 | 5 | 6 | 7 | 8 | 9 | 10 | 11 | 12 | 13 | 14 | 15 | 16 | 17 | 18 | Final |
|---|---|---|---|---|---|---|---|---|---|---|---|---|---|---|---|---|---|---|---|---|
| AP | | | | | | | | | | | | | | | | | | | | Not released |
| Coaches | | | | | | | | | | | | | | | | | | | | |

^Coaches did not release a Week 1 poll.
