= Hunter Cattoor =

American basketball player (born 2000)

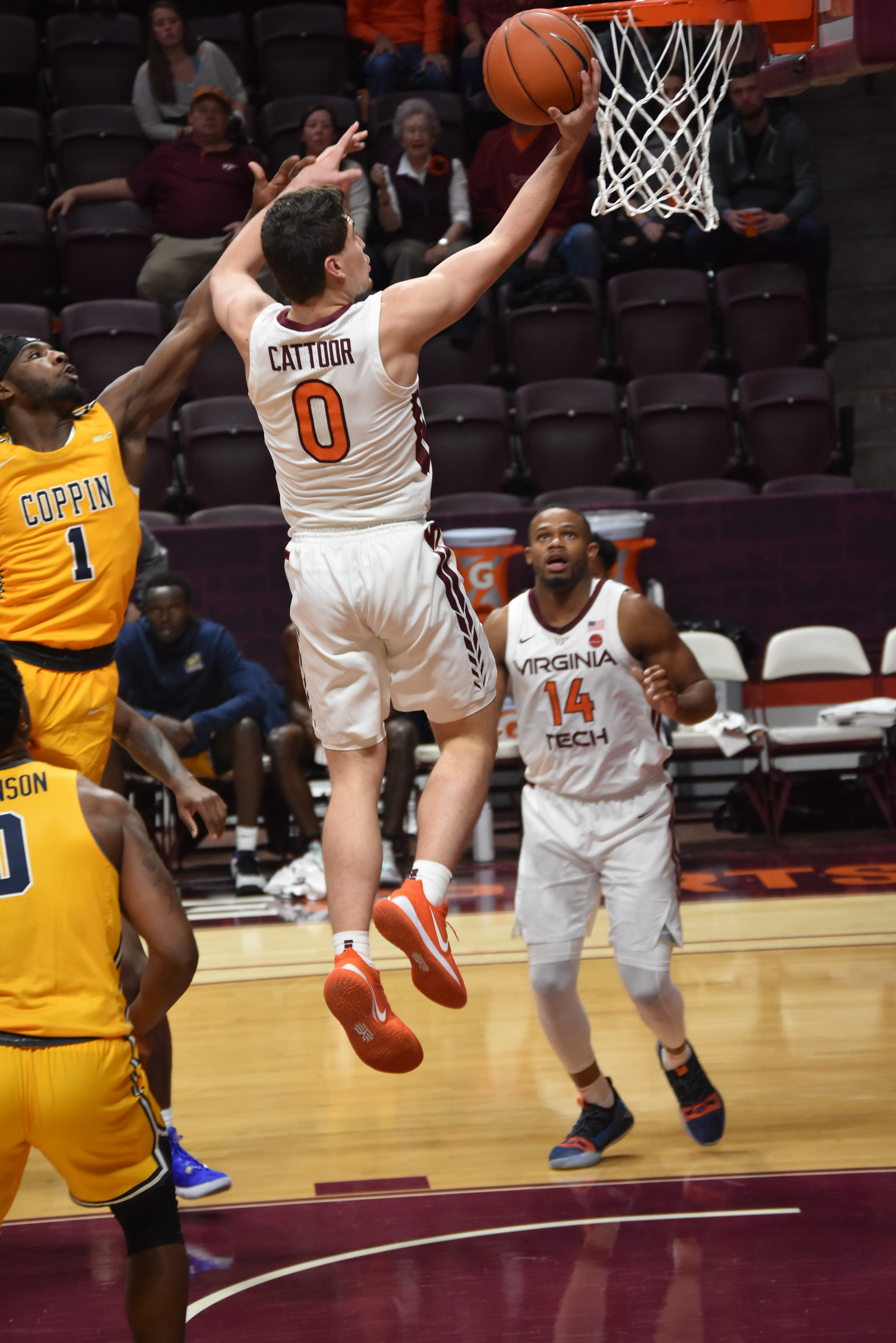

Virginia Tech Hokies
- Position: Assistant Coach
- Conference: ACC

Personal information
- Born: November 17, 2000 (age 25)
- Listed height: 6 ft 3 in (1.91 m)
- Listed weight: 201 lb (91 kg)

Career information
- High school: Bishop Moore (Orlando, Florida)
- College: Virginia Tech (2019–2024)
- NBA draft: 2024: undrafted
- Playing career: 2024–2026
- Coaching career: 2026–present

Career history

Playing
- 2024–2025: BCM Gravelines-Dunkerque
- 2025–2026: Long Island Nets

Coaching
- 2026–present: Virginia Tech (assistant)

Career highlights
- ACC tournament MVP (2022)
- Stats at Basketball Reference

Hunter Cattoor (born November 17, 2000) is an American basketball coach and former player who is currently an assistant coach for his alma mater, Virginia Tech.

== High school career ==
Cattoor grew up in Orlando, Florida and attended Bishop Moore Catholic High School. He played quarterback on the football team in addition to basketball. Cattoor suffered an ankle sprain during the last month of his senior year, ending his season.

He initially committed to play college basketball at Wofford under coach Mike Young, choosing the Terriers over Furman. When Young was hired as head coach of Virginia Tech, Cattoor followed him to the Hokies.

== College career ==
As a freshman, Cattoor averaged 6.5 points and 2.5 rebounds per game and shot 40.2% from three-point range.

He averaged 8.5 points and 1.9 rebounds per game as a sophomore.

Cattoor averaged 10 points and 4.0 rebounds per game as a junior. He was named 2022 ACC Tournament MVP after scoring 31 points in the championship game, a 82-67 upset of Duke.

As a senior, Cattoor averaged 10.8 points, 3.7 rebounds, and 2.4 assists per game.

He opted to return for his fifth season of eligibility, granted due to the COVID-19 pandemic. In his final season, he averaged 13.5 points and 2.8 rebounds per game.

== Professional career ==
After going undrafted in the 2024 NBA draft, Cattoor signed with the Cleveland Cavaliers for NBA Summer League.

He subsequently joined BCM Gravelines-Dunkerque of the French LNB Pro A. In October 2024, he was sidelined with a calf injury.

Cattoor joined the Cavaliers for 2025 NBA Summer League. On October 17, 2025, he signed with the Brooklyn Nets. Cattoor was waived the following day, ultimately joining the Long Island Nets.

== Coaching career ==
Cattoor returned to Virginia Tech as an assistant coach on June 4, 2026, retiring from playing.

== Personal life ==
Cattoor is the son of Rodney Cattoor, who was diagnosed with pancreatic cancer in late 2022. In July 2024, Cattoor married Chloe Brooks, a former Virginia Tech basketball player. Her father, Kenny Brooks, coached Virginia Tech before accepting the job at Kentucky.
