= Kevin Keatts =

American college basketball coach (born 1972)

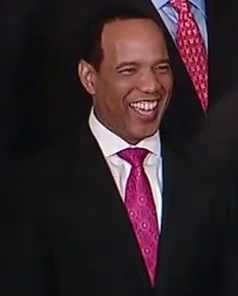
- Keatts at the White House in 2013

Biographical details
- Born: July 28, 1972 (age 54); Lynchburg, Virginia, U.S.

Playing career
- 1991–1995: Ferrum
- Position: Guard

Coaching career (HC unless noted)
- 1996–1997: Southwestern Michigan (assistant)
- 1997–1999: Hargrave Military Academy (assistant)
- 1999–2001: Hargrave Military Academy
- 2001–2003: Marshall (assistant)
- 2003–2011: Hargrave Military Academy
- 2011–2014: Louisville (assistant)
- 2014–2017: UNC Wilmington
- 2017–2025: NC State

Head coaching record
- Overall: 223–141 (.613) (college)
- Tournaments: 4–5 (NCAA Division I); 3–2 (NIT); 0–1 (CIT); 7–5 (ACC)

Accomplishments and honors

Championships
- NCAA Division I Regional – Final Four (2024); 2 National Prep (2004, 2008); 3 CAA regular season (2015–2017); 2 CAA tournament (2016, 2017); ACC tournament (2024)

Awards
- 2× CAA Coach of the Year (2015, 2016)

Kevin Andre Keatts (born July 28, 1972) is an American college basketball coach who was most recently the head coach at North Carolina State University.

== Early life and playing career ==
Keatts grew up as an only child in Lynchburg, Virginia. His father was a masonry instructor at Amherst County High School, and Keatts worked as his apprentice on the weekends. He attended Heritage High School and played point guard on their basketball team as well as quarterback on their football team. As starting quarterback, Keatts led the football team to be ranked the best in the state, losing only one game his entire career. He played basketball for Ferrum College, averaging 13.3 points per game by his senior year.

== Coaching career ==
Keatts began his coaching career as an assistant at Southwestern Michigan College for the 1996–97 season. He then went to Hargrave Military Academy as an assistant coach for two seasons before being promoted to head coach in 1999. In 2001, Keatts moved to Marshall as an assistant coach to Greg White. He returned to Hargrave in 2003 and served as the head coach until 2011. During his ten years (over two stints) as the head coach at Hargrave, Keatts had a record of 262–17. He coached several future NBA players at Hargrave including Marreese Speights and Mike Scott.

In 2011, he earned a degree from Marshall University. Keatts then joined the staff of Rick Pitino at Louisville and was a part of the Cardinals' 2013 NCAA Division I national championship team which was later vacated by the NCAA due to recruiting violations. Citing Keatts' coaching and recruiting prowess, Pitino promoted Keatts to the position of associate head coach in January 2014.

On March 27, 2014, he was named the head coach of UNC Wilmington (UNCW), succeeding Buzz Peterson. In Keatts' first season at UNCW he was named CAA Conference Coach of the Year after leading the Seahawks to their first conference championship in nine years, and first winning season in seven years.

In his second year, Keatts repeated his rookie-year double, once again winning the CAA regular-season championship and Conference Coach of the Year. In winning the 2016 conference coach of the year, he became the first coach in CAA history to ever win the award in consecutive years.

On March 17, 2017, Keatts became the 23rd head coach at North Carolina State University, succeeding Mark Gottfried. Keatts is the first Wolfpack head coach to defeat Duke, North Carolina, and Wake Forest in his first attempt since Tal Stafford during the 1918–19 season. After being projected to finish 12th in the ACC, Keatts led what recruits were left from Mark Gottfried Wolfpack to a tied-for-third-place finish in the conference, as well as earning an at-large bid to the NCAA tournament.

In 2024, the Wolfpack finished the regular season with a 17–14 overall record and a 9–11 record in the ACC, good for 10th place in the conference. However, Keatts' team rallied to win five games in five days in the ACC Tournament, including wins over No. 15 seed Louisville, No. 7 seed Syracuse, No. 2 seed and No. 11 ranked Duke, No. 3 seed Virginia, and No. 1 seed and No. 4 ranked North Carolina to earn the ACC's automatic NCAA tournament bid.

In the 2024 NCAA Tournament NC State was placed in the South Region and seeded No. 11. There the Wolfpack defeated No. 6 seed and No. 22 ranked Texas Tech, No. 14 seed Oakland, No. 2 seed and No. 8 ranked Marquette, and No. 4 seed and No. 13 ranked Duke to advance to their first Final Four since 1983, becoming only the sixth-ever 11 seed to reach the Final Four.

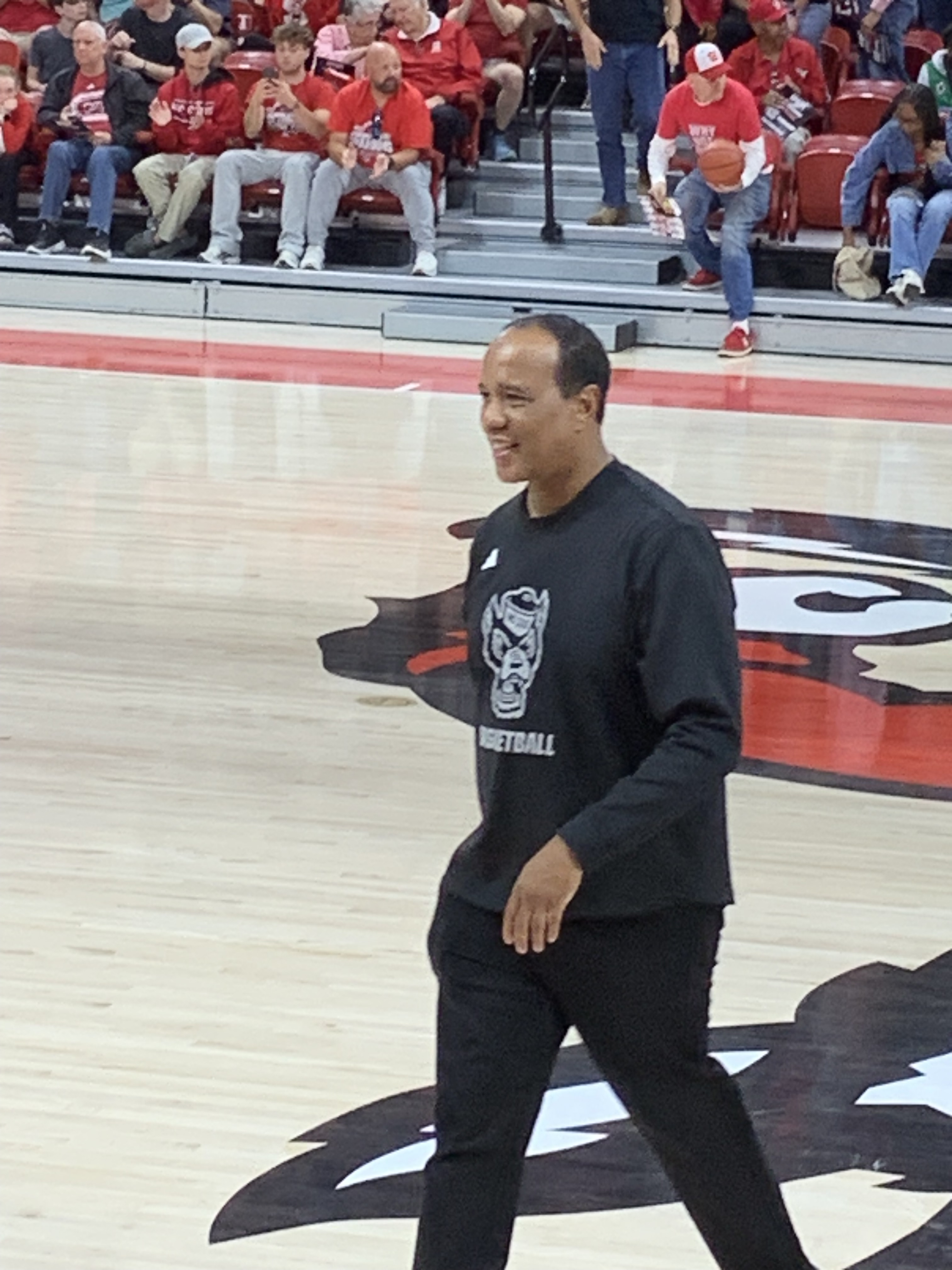
Keatts at a fan event in 2024

In 2025, the Wolfpack was unable to carry over its Final Four success from the prior season, finishing with a 12–19 overall record and a 5–15 record in the ACC. On March 9, 2025, NC State announced that Keatts would be fired at the conclusion of the season.

== Head coaching record ==
=== College ===
Record table
Season	Team	Overall	Conference	Standing	Postseason
UNC Wilmington Seahawks (Colonial Athletic Association) (2014–2017)
2014–15	UNC Wilmington	18–14	12–6	T–1st	CIT First Round
2015–16	UNC Wilmington	25–8	14–4	T–1st	NCAA Division I Round of 64
2016–17	UNC Wilmington	29–6	15–3	1st	NCAA Division I Round of 64
UNC Wilmington:		72–28 (.720)	41–13 (.759)		
NC State Wolfpack (Atlantic Coast Conference) (2017–2025)
2017–18	NC State	21–12	11–7	T–3rd	NCAA Division I Round of 64
2018–19	NC State	24–12	9–9	T–8th	NIT Quarterfinal
2019–20	NC State	20–12	10–10	T–6th	Postseason not held
2020–21	NC State	14–11	9–8	9th	NIT Quarterfinal
2021–22	NC State	11–21	4–16	15th	
2022–23	NC State	23–11	12–8	6th	NCAA Division I Round of 64
2023–24	NC State	26–15	9–11	10th	NCAA Division I Final Four
2024–25	NC State	12–19	5–15	16th	
NC State:		151–113 (.572)	69–84 (.451)		
Total:		223–141 (.613)			
National champion Postseason invitational champion Conference regular season champion Conference regular season and conference tournament champion Division regular season champion Division regular season and conference tournament champion Conference tournament champion
