= Matthew Cleveland =

American basketball player (born 2002)

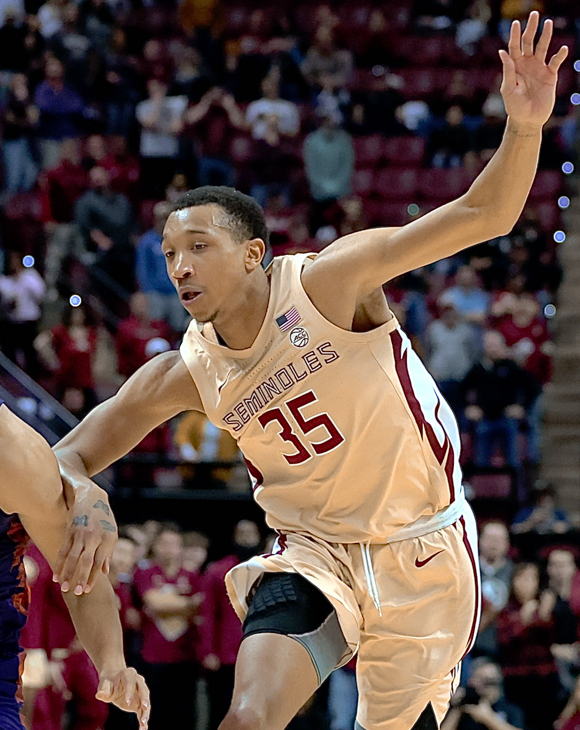
- Cleveland with Florida State in 2023

No. 0 – Saint-Quentin
- Position: Shooting guard / small forward
- League: LNB Élite

Personal information
- Born: September 15, 2002 (age 24) Atlanta, Georgia, U.S.
- Listed height: 6 ft 7 in (2.01 m)
- Listed weight: 208 lb (94 kg)

Career information
- High school: Cambridge (Milton, Georgia); Pace Academy (Atlanta, Georgia)
- College: Florida State (2021–2023); Miami (Florida) (2023–2025)
- NBA draft: 2025: undrafted
- Playing career: 2025–present

Career history
- 2025–2026: Texas Legends
- 2026: Salt Lake City Stars
- 2026: Ottawa BlackJacks
- 2026–present: Saint-Quentin

Career highlights
- ACC Sixth Man of The Year (2022); Nike Hoop Summit (2021)
- Stats at NBA.com
- Stats at Basketball Reference

Matthew Nathaniel Cleveland (born September 15, 2002) is an American professional basketball player for Saint-Quentin of the French LNB Élite. He played college basketball for the Florida State Seminoles and the Miami Hurricanes.

== High school career ==
Cleveland played basketball for Cambridge High School in Milton, Georgia. For his junior season, he transferred to Pace Academy in Atlanta, Georgia. Cleveland averaged 22.3 points, 8.1 rebounds, 2.9 assists and 2.9 steals per game as a junior, and led his team to the Class 3A state title. He was named Georgia 3A Player of the Year. As a senior, Cleveland averaged 22.8 points, 10.6 rebounds, 2.6 assists and two steals per game. He guided his team to a 28–2 record and the Class 2A state championship, earning Georgia 2A Player of the Year and The Atlanta Journal-Constitution Atlanta/South Fulton Player of the Year recognition. He was named to the United States team for the Nike Hoop Summit.

=== Recruiting ===
Cleveland was considered a five-star recruit by 247Sports and Rivals, and a four-star recruit by ESPN. On July 21, 2020, he committed to playing college basketball for Florida State over offers from Kansas, Michigan, Stanford and NC State.

College recruiting
Name	Hometown	School	Height	Weight	Commit date
Matthew Cleveland; SG / SF	Atlanta, GA	Pace Academy (GA)	6 ft 6 in (1.98 m)	200 lb (91 kg)	Jul 21, 2020
Matthew Cleveland; SG / SF	Recruit ratings: Rivals: 247Sports: ESPN: (89)				
Overall recruit ranking: Rivals: 17 247Sports: 26 ESPN: 30
Note: In many cases, Scout, Rivals, 247Sports, On3, and ESPN may conflict in their listings of height and weight.; In these cases, the average was taken. ESPN grades are on a 100-point scale.; Sources: "Florida State 2021 Basketball Commitments". Rivals.; "2021 Florida State Seminoles Recruiting Class". ESPN.; "2021 Team Ranking". Rivals.

== College career ==
On November 24, 2021, Cleveland scored 17 points including a put-back basket with 2.1 seconds remaining in overtime in an 81–80 victory over Boston University. On February 26, 2022, he scored 20 points and hit a three-pointer at the buzzer in a 64–63 win against Virginia. Cleveland was named ACC Sixth Man of The Year. Cleveland transferred to the University of Miami in the summer of 2023 for his junior and senior years.

== Professional career ==
=== Texas Legends (2025–2026) ===
In July 2025, Cleveland was signed by the Dallas Mavericks. He was waived on October 17, 2025 and later assigned to the Mavericks' NBA G League affiliate, the Texas Legends.

=== Salt Lake City Stars (2026) ===
On January 14, 2026, Cleveland was traded to the Salt Lake City Stars alongside a 2026 second-round pick in exchange for the returning player rights to Darin Green, an International draft pick, a 2027 first-round pick, and a second-round pick.

=== Saint-Quentin (2026–present) ===
On September 11, 2026, he signed with Saint-Quentin Basket-Ball of the French LNB Élite.

== Career statistics ==
Legend
GP	Games played	GS	Games started	MPG	Minutes per game
FG%	Field goal percentage	3P%	3-point field goal percentage	FT%	Free throw percentage
RPG	Rebounds per game	APG	Assists per game	SPG	Steals per game
BPG	Blocks per game	PPG	Points per game	**Bold**	Career high

=== College ===
Year	Team	GP	GS	MPG	FG%	3P%	FT%	RPG	APG	SPG	BPG	PPG
2021–22	Florida State	29	8	26.2	.452	.176	.555	4.6	1.2	.7	.5	11.5
2022–23	Florida State	**30**	**30**	**33.6**	.445	.350	.690	**7.4**	**1.8**	.8	**.8**	13.8
2023–24	Miami	29	29	33.2	.489	.357	**.795**	6.1	1.7	**1.3**	.7	13.7
2024–25	Miami	29	21	30.3	**.511**	**.382**	.776	4.4	1.7	.8	**.8**	**17.6**
Career		117	88	30.9	.475	.341	.701	5.6	1.6	.9	.6	14.1
