= Keve Aluma =

American basketball player (born 1998)

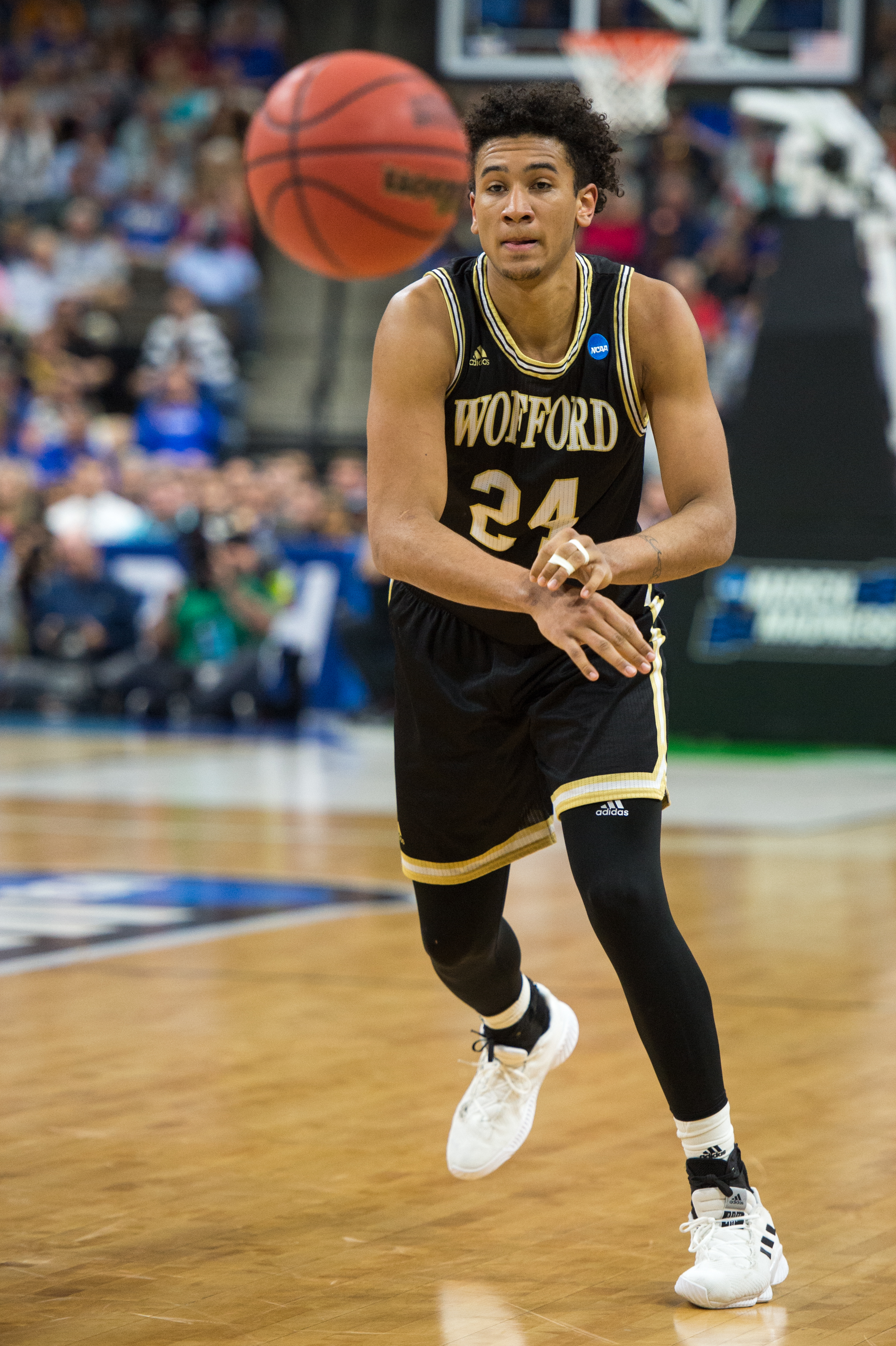
- Aluma with Wofford in 2019

No. 19 – Daegu KOGAS Pegasus
- Position: Power forward
- League: KBL

Personal information
- Born: December 31, 1998 (age 27)
- Listed height: 6 ft 9 in (2.06 m)
- Listed weight: 239 lb (108 kg)

Career information
- High school: Stephen Decatur (Berlin, Maryland)
- College: Wofford (2017–2019); Virginia Tech (2020–2022)
- Playing career: 2022–present

Career history
- 2022–2023: Niigata Albirex
- 2023–2024: Ulsan Hyundai Mobis Phoebus
- 2024–2025: Ryukyu Golden Kings
- 2026–present: Daegu KOGAS Pegasus

Career highlights
- 2× Second-team All-ACC (2021, 2022)

Keve Christian Aluma (born December 31, 1998) is an American professional basketball player for the Daegu KOGAS Pegasus of the Korean Basketball League (KBL). He previously played for the Virginia Tech Hokies and the Wofford Terriers.

== Early life and high school career ==
Aluma grew up playing soccer and did not play basketball until high school. He stood 6'7" as a freshman at Stephen Decatur High School in Berlin, Maryland. Aluma was a three-year starter for Decatur, leading the team to two regional titles and a 3A state championship game appearance. He was named Bayside South Player of the Year in his senior season. Aluma committed to playing college basketball for Wofford over offers from Loyola (Maryland), UTEP and UMBC, among others.

== College career ==
Aluma averaged 2.5 points and 3.4 rebounds per game as a freshman at Wofford. He became a starter in his next season. On January 3, 2019, Aluma matched his season-high 14 points and nine rebounds in a 112–81 win over The Citadel. As a sophomore, he averaged 6.9 points and 6.8 rebounds per game. Aluma transferred to Virginia Tech, where his previous coach Mike Young was hired, and sat out for one season due to transfer rules.

On November 28, 2020, he posted 23 points and eight rebounds in an 81–73 overtime win over third-ranked Villanova. On January 30, 2021, he recorded 29 points, 10 rebounds and four assists, leading his team to a 65–61 win over eighth-ranked Virginia. In his following game, Aluma posted 30 points, 10 rebounds and five assists in an 83–72 loss to Pittsburgh. As a redshirt junior, Aluma averaged 15.2 points and 7.9 rebounds per game, earning Second Team All-ACC honors. Following the season, he declared for the 2021 NBA draft, but ultimately returned for his senior season. Aluma was again named to the Second Team All-ACC as a senior.

== Career statistics ==
Legend
GP	Games played	GS	Games started	MPG	Minutes per game
FG%	Field goal percentage	3P%	3-point field goal percentage	FT%	Free throw percentage
RPG	Rebounds per game	APG	Assists per game	SPG	Steals per game
BPG	Blocks per game	PPG	Points per game	**Bold**	Career high

=== College ===
Year	Team	GP	GS	MPG	FG%	3P%	FT%	RPG	APG	SPG	BPG	PPG
2017–18	Wofford	33	3	13.3	.566	–	.571	3.4	.5	.2	.4	2.5
2018–19	Wofford	**35**	**34**	26.6	**.667**	.000	.574	6.8	1.0	**.7**	.9	6.9
2019–20	Virginia Tech	Redshirt										
2020–21	Virginia Tech	22	22	**30.6**	.490	**.351**	**.722**	**7.9**	**2.2**	**.7**	**1.3**	**15.2**
Career		90	59	22.7	.556	.345	.639	5.8	1.1	.5	.8	7.3

== Personal life ==
His biological father, Peter Aluma, played in the National Basketball Association (NBA) for part of one season. He was raised by his mother and stepfather, Bethany and Bruce Copeland. He played with the Philadelphia 76ers summer league team in 2025.
