= Colorado State Rams men's basketball statistical leaders =

The Colorado State Rams men's basketball statistical leaders are individual statistical leaders of the Colorado State Rams men's basketball program in various categories, including points, rebounds, assists, steals, and blocks. Within those areas, the lists identify single-game, single-season, and career leaders. The Rams represent Colorado State University in the NCAA's Pac-12 Conference.

Colorado State began competing in intercollegiate basketball in 1901. However, the school's record book does not generally list records from before the 1950s, as records from before this period are often incomplete and inconsistent. Since scoring was much lower in this era, and teams played much fewer games during a typical season, it is likely that few or no players from this era would appear on these lists anyway.

The NCAA did not officially record assists as a stat until the 1983–84 season, and blocks and steals until the 1985–86 season, but Colorado State's record books includes players in these stats before these seasons. These lists are updated through the end of the 2025–26 season.

== Scoring ==
Career
Rk	Player	Points	Seasons
1	Isaiah Stevens	2350	2019–20 2020–21 2021–22 2022–23 2023–24
2	Pat Durham	1980	1985–86 1986–87 1987–88 1988–89
3	Bill Green	1682	1960–61 1961–62 1962–63
4	Matt Nelson	1641	2001–02 2002–03 2003–04 2004–05
5	Rich Strong	1554	1982–83 1983–84 1984–85 1985–86
6	David Turcotte	1509	1984–85 1985–86 1986–87 1987–88
7	Dorian Green	1464	2009–10 2010–11 2011–12 2012–13
8	Nico Carvacho	1414	2016–17 2017–18 2018–19 2019–20
9	Barry Young	1413	1977–78 1978–79 1979–80
10	David Roddy	1406	2019–20 2020–21 2021–22

Season
Rk	Player	Points	Season
1	Nique Clifford	681	2024–25
2	Pat Durham	676	1987–88
3	Bill Green	649	1962–63
4	Pat Durham	611	1988–89
5	Gary Rhoades	597	1972–73
6	David Roddy	595	2021–22
7	Mike Mitchell	586	1989–90
8	Isaiah Stevens	576	2023–24
9	Bill Green	573	1961–62
10	David Evans	568	1995–96

Single game
Rk	Player	Points	Season	Opponent
1	Bill Green	48	1962–63	Denver
2	Bill Green	44	1962–63	Regis
3	Marcus Walker	43	2007–08	Tennessee St.
4	Barry Young	42	1977–78	Pacific
5	Gary Rhoades	38	1972–73	Arizona State
	Bill Green	38	1962–63	Montana State
7	Bill Green	37	1961–62	Holy Cross
	Barry Young	37	1978–79	UCLA
	Gian Clavell	37	2016–17	San Diego State
10	Dorian Green	36	2010–11	Northern Colorado
	Bill Green	36	1961–62	Northwestern
	David Evans	36	1995–96	BYU
	David Roddy	36	2021–22	Creighton
	Nique Clifford	36	2024–25	Boise State

== Rebounds ==
Career
Rk	Player	Rebounds	Seasons
1	Nico Carvacho	1295	2016–17 2017–18 2018–19 2019–20
2	Pat Durham	851	1985–86 1986–87 1987–88 1988–89
3	Rich Strong	805	1982–83 1983–84 1984–85 1985–86
4	Pierce Hornung	799	2009–10 2010–11 2011–12 2012–13
5	Matt Barnett	772	1994–95 1995–96 1996–97 1997–98
6	Mike Childress	741	1969–70 1970–71
7	Bill Green	726	1960–61 1961–62 1962–63
8	Daniel Bejarano	694	2012–13 2013–14 2014–15
9	Jason Smith	683	2004–05 2005–06 2006–07
10	David Roddy	677	2019–20 2020–21 2021–22

Season
Rk	Player	Rebounds	Season
1	Nico Carvacho	414	2018–19
2	Mike Childress	390	1969–70
3	Emmanuel Omogbo	373	2016–17
4	Mike Childress	348	1970–71
5	Nique Clifford	346	2024–25
6	Nico Carvacho	345	2019–20
7	Colton Iverson	342	2012–13
8	Nico Carvacho	331	2017–18
9	Jason Smith	304	2006–07
10	Pierce Hornung	293	2012–13

Single game
Rk	Player	Rebounds	Season	Opponent
1	Mike Childress	26	1970–71	Rice
	Mike Childress	26	1969–70	San Jose State
3	Mike Childress	24	1969–70	Arizona
	Mike Childress	24	1969–70	Utah State
5	Mike Childress	23	1970–71	Wyoming
6	Nico Carvacho	22	2018–19	Long Beach State
	Mike Childress	22	1969–70	Denver
8	Mike Childress	21	1970–71	Arizona
	Alan Cunningham	21	1976–77	Stanford
	Mike Childress	21	1969–70	New Mexico

== Assists ==
Career
Rk	Player	Assists	Seasons
1	Isaiah Stevens	863	2019–20 2020–21 2021–22 2022–23 2023–24
2	Ryan Yoder	530	1990–91 1991–92 1992–93 1993–94
3	Milt Palacio	420	1996–97 1997–98 1998–99
4	Bobby Sellers	410	1992–93 1993–94 1994–95 1995–96
5	Eddie Hughes	397	1978–79 1979–80 1980–81 1981–82
6	Dorian Green	373	2009–10 2010–11 2011–12 2012–13
7	Micheal Morris	367	2002–03 2003–04 2004–05 2005–06
8	Matt Barnett	353	1994–95 1995–96 1996–97 1997–98
9	Andy Birley	327	1999–00 2000–01 2001–02 2002–03
10	Barry Bailey	302	1984–85 1985–86 1986–87 1987–88

Season
Rk	Player	Assists	Season
1	Isaiah Stevens	245	2023–24
2	Ryan Yoder	204	1992–93
3	Ryan Yoder	187	1993–94
4	Isaiah Stevens	175	2022–23
5	Jevin Muniz	167	2025–26
6	Nique Clifford	160	2024–25
7	Bobby Sellers	155	1995–96
8	Isaiah Stevens	152	2020–21
9	Milt Palacio	147	1996–97
	Isaiah Stevens	147	2021–22

Single game
Rk	Player	Assists	Season	Opponent
1	Isaiah Stevens	14	2023–24	Wright State
2	Isaiah Stevens	13	2022–23	New Mexico
3	Isaiah Stevens	12	2022–23	Wyoming
	Isaiah Stevens	12	2022–23	Boise State
	Isaiah Stevens	12	2021–22	Little Rock
	Isaiah Stevens	12	2019–20	Tulsa
	Ryan Yoder	12	1992–93	Fort Lewis
	Rudy Carey	12	1973–74	Wisc.-Milwaukee
9	John Gillon	11	2014–15	Nevada
	Micheal Morris	11	2004–05	San Diego State
	Bobby Sellers	11	1995–96	Utah
	Bobby Sellers	11	1994–95	Fresno State
	Ryan Yoder	11	1993–94	New Mexico
	Ryan Yoder	11	1993–94	Hawaii
	Ryan Yoder	11	1992–93	Hawaii
	Ryan Yoder	11	1992–93	Colorado
	Ryan Yoder	11	1992–93	Fort Lewis
	Ryan Yoder	11	1991–92	East Carolina
	Ryan Yoder	11	1991–92	Rice
	Isaiah Stevens	11	2021–22	Creighton
	Isaiah Stevens	11	2022–23	San Diego State
	Isaiah Stevens	11	2023–24	Colorado
	Isaiah Stevens	11	2023–24	Boise State
	Isaiah Stevens	11	2023–24	San Jose State

== Steals ==
Career
Rk	Player	Steals	Seasons
1	Isaiah Stevens	158	2019–20 2020–21 2021–22 2022–23 2023–24
2	Pierce Hornung	156	2009–10 2010–11 2011–12 2012–13
3	Kendle Moore	153	2018–19 2019–20 2020–21 2021–22
4	Milt Palacio	147	1996–97 1997–98 1998–99
5	Brian Greene	128	1999–00 2000–01 2001–02 2002–03
6	Adam Nigon	121	2007–08 2008–09 2009–10 2010–11
7	David Evans	118	1994–95 1995–96
8	J.D. Paige	110	2015–16 2016–17 2017–18 2018–19
9	Eddie Hughes	109	1978–79 1979–80 1980–81 1981–82
10	Cory Lewis	108	2005–06 2006–07
	Damon Crawford	108	1990–91 1991–92 1992–93 1993–94

Season
Rk	Player	Steals	Season
1	David Evans	72	1995–96
2	Andre Mckanstry	68	1998–99
3	Damon Crawford	66	1993–94
4	J. J. Avila	62	2014–15
5	Cory Lewis	61	2006–07
6	Milt Palacio	60	1998–99
7	Mike Mitchell	59	1989–90
8	Pat Durham	54	1988–89
9	Gian Clavell	53	2016–17
10	Pierce Hornung	49	2011–12
	Brian Greene	49	2001–02

Single game
Rk	Player	Steals	Season	Opponent
1	Eddie Hughes	8	1981–82	SDSU
	Milt Palacio	8	1998–99	Nevada
3	David Evans	7	1995–96	BYU
	Damon Crawford	7	1992–93	SEMS
	Milt Palacio	7	1998–99	S. Alabama
6	Gian Clavell	6	2016–17	San Diego State
	Pierce Hornung	6	2011–12	Chardron State
	Damon Crawford	6	1993–94	SDSU
	Damon Crawford	6	1993–94	Utah
	Bobby Sellers	6	1992–93	Rice
	Mark Meredith	6	1990–91	Air Force
	David Evans	6	1995–96	Utah
	Delmonte Madison	6	1995–96	SDSU
	Tyler Smith	6	2006–07	Boise State
	Tyler Smith	6	2006–07	TCU

== Blocks ==
Career
Rk	Player	Blocks	Seasons
1	Ryan Chilton	184	1994–95 1995–96 1996–97 1997–98
2	Joe Vogel	180	1992–93 1993–94 1994–95 1995–96
3	Matt Nelson	155	2001–02 2002–03 2003–04 2004–05
4	Stuart Creason	153	2004–05 2005–06 2006–07 2007–08
5	Jason Smith	149	2004–05 2005–06 2006–07
6	Micheal Morris	131	2002–03 2003–04 2004–05 2005–06
7	Pat Durham	111	1985–86 1986–87 1987–88 1988–89
8	Rich Strong	109	1982–83 1983–84 1984–85 1985–86
9	John Ford	92	1996–97 1997–98 1998–99 1999–00
10	Alan Cunningham	80	1976–77 1977–78

Season
Rk	Player	Blocks	Season
1	Ryan Chilton	71	1997–98
2	Jason Smith	66	2005–06
	Michael Harrison	66	2005–06
4	Stuart Creason	64	2006–07
5	Ryan Chilton	63	1996–97
6	Joe Vogel	62	1995–96
7	Joe Vogel	57	1993–94
8	Jason Smith	47	2006–07
	Pat Durham	47	1986–87
10	Pat Durham	44	1988–89
	Matt Nelson	44	2002–03
	Michael Morris	44	2002–03

Single game
Rk	Player	Blocks	Season	Opponent
1	John Ford	11	1999–00	Florida A&M
2	Joe Vogel	8	1993–94	Utah
3	Joe Vogel	7	1992–93	Utah St.
	Joe Vogel	7	1995–96	BYU
	Jason Smith	7	2005–06	Northern Colorado
	Stuart Creason	7	2006–07	Wyoming
7	Stuart Creason	6	2005–06	TCU
	Michael Harrison	6	2005–06	San Diego State
	Carey Booth	6	2025–26	Nevada
	Carey Booth	6	2025–26	Wyoming
