= 1981–82 Wyoming Cowboys basketball team =

American college basketball season

1981–82 Wyoming Cowboys basketball

WAC champions

NCAA tournament, Second round
- Conference: Western Athletic Conference

Ranking
- Coaches: No. 15
- Record: 23–7 (14–2 WAC)
- Head coach: Jim Brandenburg (3rd season)
- Home arena: War Memorial Fieldhouse

1981–82 WAC men's basketball standings
	Conf.				Overall
Team	W		L	PCT	W		L	PCT
Wyoming	14	–	2	.875	23	–	7	.767
UTEP	11	–	5	.688	20	–	8	.714
San Diego State	11	–	5	.688	20	–	9	.690
Hawaii	9	–	7	.563	17	–	10	.630
BYU	9	–	7	.563	17	–	13	.567
New Mexico	7	–	9	.438	14	–	14	.500
Utah	6	–	10	.375	11	–	17	.393
Air Force	3	–	13	.188	8	–	19	.296
Colorado State	2	–	14	.125	8	–	19	.296
Rankings from AP Poll

The 1981–82 Wyoming Cowboys basketball team represented the University of Wyoming as a member of the Western Athletic Conference during the 1981–82 NCAA Division I men's basketball season. The Cowboys, led by third-year head coach Jim Brandenburg, played their home games at War Memorial Fieldhouse in Laramie, Wyoming.

== Roster ==
1981–82 Wyoming Cowboys men's basketball team
Players
Coaches

Pos.	#	Name	Height	Weight	Year	Previous school	Hometown
F		Bill Garnett	6 ft 9 in (2.06 m)	220 lb (100 kg)	Sr	Regis Jesuit	Denver, Colorado
C		Chris Engler	6 ft 11 in (2.11 m)	240 lb (109 kg)	Sr	Minnesota	Oak Park Heights, Minnesota

Head coach

- Jim Brandenburg (Colorado State)

Assistant coach(es)

Legend

- (C) Team captain
- (S) Suspended
- (I) Ineligible
- (W) Walk-on
- Injured
- Current redshirt

== Schedule and results ==
Date time, TV	Rank^{#}	Opponent^{#}	Result	Record	Site city, state
Regular Season
Nov 27, 1981*		Nebraska	W 62–48	1–0	War Memorial Fieldhouse; Laramie, Wyoming
Nov 28, 1981*		Portland	W 63–47	2–0	War Memorial Fieldhouse; Laramie, Wyoming
Dec 4, 1981*		vs. Canisius; Show-Me Classic	W 73–40	3–0	Hearnes Center; Columbia, Missouri
Dec 5, 1981*		at No. 16 Missouri; Show-Me Classic	L 54–64	3–1	Hearnes Center; Columbia, Missouri
Dec 10, 1981*		at Colorado	L 73–75	3–2	CU Events/Conference Center; Boulder, Colorado
Dec 18, 1981*		vs. California	L 75–77	3–3	
Dec 19, 1981*		vs. American	W 71–63	4–3	
Dec 29, 1981*		Illinois-Chicago	W 73–53	5–3	War Memorial Fieldhouse; Laramie, Wyoming
Jan 2, 1982		Colorado State	W 51–31	6–3 (1–0)	War Memorial Fieldhouse; Laramie, Wyoming
Jan 7, 1982		Utah	W 75–49	7–3 (2–0)	War Memorial Fieldhouse; Laramie, Wyoming
Jan 9, 1982		BYU	W 61–42	8–3 (3–0)	War Memorial Fieldhouse; Laramie, Wyoming
Jan 13, 1982		at Air Force	W 54–40	9–3 (4–0)	Clune Arena; Colorado Springs, Colorado
Jan 15, 1982*		at UNLV	L 58–69	9–4	Las Vegas Convention Center; Las Vegas, Nevada
Jan 22, 1982		San Diego State	W 77–64	10–4 (5–0)	War Memorial Fieldhouse; Laramie, Wyoming
Jan 23, 1982		at BYU	W 27–25	11–4 (6–0)	Marriott Center; Provo, Utah
Jan 25, 1982		Hawaii	W 87–61	12–4 (7–0)	War Memorial Fieldhouse; Laramie, Wyoming
Jan 29, 1982		at UTEP	L 45–51	12–5 (7–1)	Special Events Center; El Paso, Texas
Jan 30, 1982		at New Mexico	W 75–65	13–5 (8–1)	University Arena; Albuquerque, New Mexico
Feb 6, 1982		at Utah	W 66–51	14–5 (9–1)	Special Events Center; Salt Lake City, Utah
Feb 11, 1982		New Mexico	W 56–45	15–5 (10–1)	War Memorial Fieldhouse; Laramie, Wyoming
Feb 13, 1982		UTEP	L 37–43	15–6 (10–2)	War Memorial Fieldhouse; Laramie, Wyoming
Feb 20, 1982		Air Force	W 59–29	16–6 (11–2)	War Memorial Fieldhouse; Laramie, Wyoming
Feb 27, 1982		at Colorado State	W 63–57	17–6 (12–2)	Moby Arena; Fort Collins, Colorado
Mar 4, 1982		at Hawaii	W 39–37	18–6 (13–2)	Neal S. Blaisdell Center; Honolulu, Hawaii
Mar 6, 1982		at San Diego State	W 66–64 ^{OT}	22–6 (14–2)	San Diego Sports Arena; San Diego, California
NCAA tournament
Mar 11, 1982*	(8 W)	vs. (9 W) USC; First round	W 61–58	23–6	Dee Glen Smith Spectrum; Logan, Utah
Mar 13, 1982*; 4:24 pm	(8 W)	vs. (1 W) No. 6 Georgetown; Second round	L 43–51	23–7	Dee Glen Smith Spectrum (9,546); Logan, Utah
*Non-conference game. ^{#}Rankings from AP Poll. (#) Tournament seedings in parentheses. W=West. All times are in Mountain Time.
