= 1974–75 New Mexico Lobos women's basketball team =

Intercollegiate basketball season

1974–75 New Mexico Lobos women's basketball
- Conference: Intermountain Conference
- Record: 7–11 (5–8 Intermountain)
- Head coach: Kathy Marpe (1st season)
- Home arena: UNM Arena

The 1974–75 New Mexico Lobos women's basketball team represented the University of New Mexico in the 1974-75 AIAW women's basketball season. In their inaugural season, the Lobos were coached by Kathy Marpe, who also coached the women's volleyball, and started the women's track and field teams. They played in the Intermountain Conference.

== Roster ==
2019–20 New Mexico Lobos women's basketball team
Players
Coaches

| Pos. | # | Name | Height | Year | Hometown |
|---|---|---|---|---|---|
| | | Chris Baca | — |
| | | Beth Born | — |
| | | Colleen Conway | — |
| | | Jane Cottner | — |
| | | Dee Dow | — |
| | | Margaret Gonzales | — |
| | | Linda Hattox | — |
| | | Patty Howell | — |
| | | Debbie Kates | — |
| | | Phyllis Shelton | — |
| | | Anton Simoes | — |

Head coach

- Kathy Marpe (Minnesota)

Assistant coach(es)

Legend

- (C) Team captain
- (S) Suspended
- (I) Ineligible
- (W) Walk-on
- Injured
- Current redshirt

Roster

== Schedule and results ==
| Date time, TV | Rank^{#} | Opponent^{#} | Result | Record | Site city, state |
|---|---|---|---|---|---|
| Jan 10, 1975* | | Gallup | L 45–79 | 0–1 | UNM Arena; Albuquerque, NM |
| Jan 11, 1975* | | Gallup | L 42–70 | 0–2 | UNM Arena; Albuquerque, NM |
| Jan 20, 1975* | | at UNLV | L 64–71 | 0–3 | Las Vegas Convention Center; Las Vegas, NV |
| Jan 24, 1975 | | Colorado State | L 52–55 | 0–4 | UNM Arena; Albuquerque, NM |
| Jan 25, 1975 | | Colorado | W 55–38 | 1–4 | UNM Arena; Albuquerque, NM |
| Jan 31, 1975 | | at Northern Colorado | L 52–57 | 1–5 | Butler-Hancock Hall; Greeley, CO |
| Feb 1, 1975 | | at Wyoming | L 45–65 | 1–6 | War Memorial Fieldhouse; Laramie, WY |
| Feb 7, 1975 | | Weber State | W 59–55 | 2–6 | UNM Arena; Albuquerque, NM |
| Feb 8, 1975 | | Utah State | L 46–62 | 2–7 | UNM Arena; Albuquerque, NM |
| Feb 13, 1975 | | Northern Arizona | W 65–37 | 3–7 | UNM Arena; Albuquerque, NM |
| Feb 14, 1975 | | UTEP | W 45–42 | 4–7 | UNM Arena; Albuquerque, NM |
| Feb 15, 1975 | | at New Mexico State; Rio Grande Rivalry | W 60–58 | 5–7 | Pan American Center; Las Cruces, NM |
| Feb 16, 1975* | | Eastern New Mexico | L 41–60 | 5–8 | UNM Arena; Albuquerque, NM |
| Feb 21, 1975 | | at Utah | L 38–45 | 5–9 | Jon M. Huntsman Center; Salt Lake City, UT |
| Feb 22, 1975 | | at BYU | L 36–60 | 5–10 | Marriott Center; Provo, UT |
| Feb 26, 1975* | | Fort Bliss | W 48–27 | 6–10 | UNM Arena; Albuquerque, NM |
| Feb 28, 1975 | | Arizona | L 33–83 | 6–11 | UNM Arena; Albuquerque, NM |
| Mar 2, 1975 | | Arizona State | W 55–42 | 7–11 | UNM Arena; Albuquerque, NM |
*Non-conference game. ^{#}Rankings from AP Poll. (#) Tournament seedings in parentheses.
