= 1981–82 Colorado State Rams men's basketball team =

American college basketball season

1981–82 Colorado State Rams men's basketball
- Conference: Western Athletic Conference
- Record: 8–19 (2–14 WAC)
- Head coach: Tony McAndrews (2nd season)
- Home arena: Moby Arena

1981–82 WAC men's basketball standings
	Conf.				Overall
Team	W		L	PCT	W		L	PCT
Wyoming	14	–	2	.875	23	–	7	.767
UTEP	11	–	5	.688	20	–	8	.714
San Diego State	11	–	5	.688	20	–	9	.690
Hawaii	9	–	7	.563	17	–	10	.630
BYU	9	–	7	.563	17	–	13	.567
New Mexico	7	–	9	.438	14	–	14	.500
Utah	6	–	10	.375	11	–	17	.393
Air Force	3	–	13	.188	8	–	19	.296
Colorado State	2	–	14	.125	8	–	19	.296
Rankings from AP Poll

The 1981–82 Colorado State Rams men's basketball team represented the Colorado State University as a member of the Western Athletic Conference during the 1981–82 men's basketball season. The Rams finished the regular season with a record of 8–19, 2–14 in conference play.

== Roster ==
1981–82 Colorado State Rams men's basketball team
Players	Coaches
Pos. / # / Name / Height / Weight / Year / Previous school / Hometown; F / 35 / Mick DeLavallade / 6 ft 7 in (2.01 m) / 190 lb (86 kg) / Fr / Westminster High School / Westminster, California	Head coach: Tony McAndrews; Assistant coach(es) Legend: (C) Team captain; (S) Suspended; (I) Ineligible; (W) Walk-on; Injured; Current redshirt

== Schedule ==
Date time, TV	Rank^{#}	Opponent^{#}	Result	Record	Site city, state
November 28*		CSU-Pueblo	W 73–62	1–0	Moby Arena; Fort Collins, Colorado
December 1*		Northern Colorado	W 68–58	2–0	Moby Arena; Fort Collins, Colorado
December 4*		at Oral Roberts	L 68–81	2–1	Mabee Center; Tulsa, Oklahoma
December 5*		at Oklahoma State	L 71–73	2–2	Gallagher-Iba Arena; Stillwater, Oklahoma
December 11*		at No. 10 Indiana	L 74–82	2–3	Assembly Hall; Bloomington, IN
December 12*		vs. SMU	W 74–56	3–3	Assembly Hall; Bloomington, IN
December 19*		at Colorado	L 53–54	3–4	Coors Events/Conference Center
December 23*		Nebraska	W 58–51	4–4	Moby Arena; Fort Collins, Colorado
December 30*		Indiana State	W 65–59	5–4	Moby Arena; Fort Collins, Colorado
January 2		at Wyoming	L 31–51	5–5 (0–1)	War Memorial Fieldhouse; Laramie, Wyoming
January 7		BYU	W 50–40	6–5 (1–1)	Moby Arena; Fort Collins, Colorado
January 9		Utah	L 55–64	6–6 (1–2)	Moby Arena; Fort Collins, Colorado
*Non-conference game. ^{#}Rankings from AP Poll. (#) Tournament seedings in parentheses.
