= Isaiah Stevens =

American basketball player (born 2000)

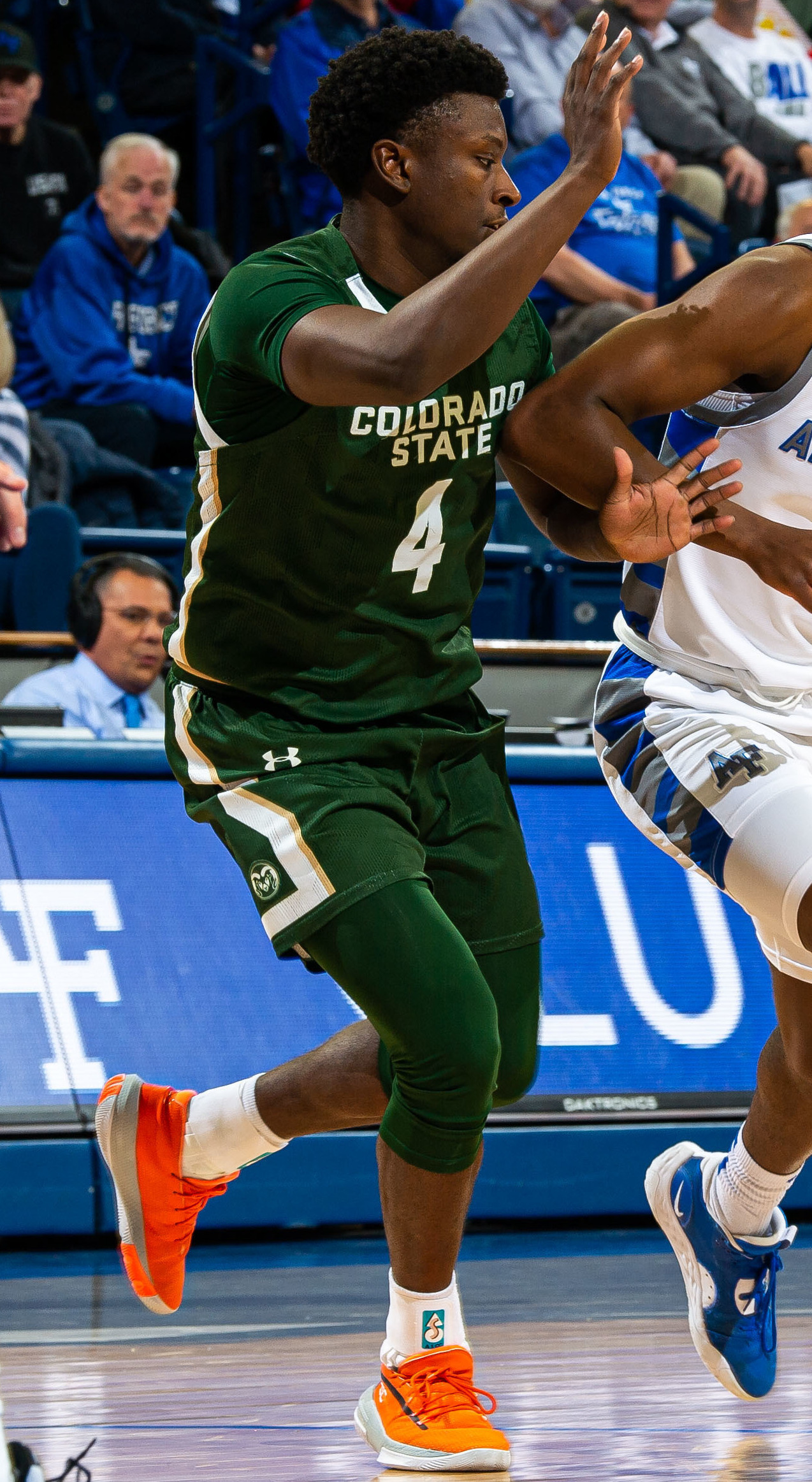
- Stevens with Colorado State in 2023

No. 24 – Windy City Bulls
- Position: Point guard
- League: NBA G League

Personal information
- Born: November 1, 2000 (age 26) Allen, Texas, U.S.
- Listed height: 5 ft 11 in (1.80 m)
- Listed weight: 185 lb (84 kg)

Career information
- High school: Allen (Allen, Texas)
- College: Colorado State (2019–2024)
- NBA draft: 2024: undrafted
- Playing career: 2024–present

Career history
- 2024: Sioux Falls Skyforce
- 2024–2025: Miami Heat
- 2024–2025: →Sioux Falls Skyforce
- 2025–2026: Sacramento Kings
- 2025–2026: →Stockton Kings
- 2026–present: Windy City Bulls

Career highlights
- NBA G League assists leader (2025); 2× First-team All-Mountain West (2023, 2024); 2× Second-team All-Mountain West (2021, 2022); Third-team All-Mountain West (2020); Mountain West Freshman of the Year (2020)
- Stats at NBA.com
- Stats at Basketball Reference

Isaiah T. Stevens (born November 1, 2000) is an American professional basketball player for the Windy City Bulls of the NBA G League. He played college basketball for the Colorado State Rams.

== High school career ==
Stevens attended Allen High School in Allen, Texas. As a junior, he led his team to the Class 6A state title. In his senior season, Stevens averaged 21 points and was named District 9-6A co-MVP. He competed for Team Faith on the Amateur Athletic Union circuit alongside five-star recruit Greg Brown III. Stevens committed to playing college basketball for Colorado State over offers from SMU and Mississippi State, among others.

== College career ==
Stevens began his collegiate career as the starting point guard for the Colorado State Rams, a role he would maintain throughout his decorated career. On December 22, 2019, Stevens recorded a freshman season-high 26 points, 12 assists and five steals in a 111–104 win over Tulsa in triple overtime. On January 29, 2020, he made a game-winning buzzer beater as part of a 12-point effort in a 92–91 victory over Nevada. As a freshman, Stevens averaged 13.3 points, 4.5 assists and 3.1 rebounds per game, setting the program freshman record for assists. He earned Mountain West Freshman of the Year honors and was selected to the Third Team All-Mountain West by the league's coaches.

As a sophomore, Stevens averaged 15.3 points, 5.4 assists and 4.3 rebounds per game. He was named to the Second Team All-Mountain West. The Rams finished the 2020-21 season with a 20-8 record while making it to the semifinals of the NIT tournament before falling to Memphis.

As a junior, Stevens averaged 14.7 points, 4.7 assists, and 3.2 rebounds per game. On January 28, 2022, Stevens scored a career high 35 points against UNLV. Stevens was named to the Second Team All-Mountain West. Stevens helped lead the Rams to their first NCAA Tournament appearance since 2013, securing a No. 6 seed—the highest in program history. The Rams finished the season ranked in the top 25 AP poll for the first time in school history.

As a senior, Stevens averaged 17.9 points, 6.7 assists, and 3.4 rebounds per game. Stevens lead the conference in assists per game and was named to the First Team All-Mountain West.

In his final collegiate season, Stevens was named Mountain West preseason player of the year. On November 11, 2023, Stevens set a Colorado State single-game record by recording 14 assists. On January 2, 2024, Stevens surpassed 2,000 career points. Stevens led Colorado State to its highest AP Poll ranking in program history, reaching No. 13. The Rams would appear in the Top 25 nine times throughout that season, a school record. The Rams would also return to the NCAA Tournament, earning a 67–42 win over Virginia in the First Four before falling to Texas in the Round of 64. Stevens averaged 16.0 points, 6.8 assists, and 3.2 rebounds per game. He set a single season school record with 245 assists and once again lead the conference in assists per game. He was named to the First Team All-Mountain West.

Stevens is Colorado State's all-time leader in scoring (2,350), assists (863), and steals (158) among many other records.

== Professional career ==
After going undrafted in the 2024 NBA draft, Stevens signed the Miami Heat to an Exhibit 10 contract on July 6, 2024, but was waived on October 19. On October 28, he joined the Sioux Falls Skyforce and on December 26, he signed a two-way contract with the Heat.

On July 7, 2025, Stevens signed a two-way contract with the Sacramento Kings. Stevens appeared in three games for Sacramento, recording averages of 3.3 points, 1.0 rebounds, 3.3 assists, and 1.7 steals. On July 27, 2026, Stevens was waived by the Kings.

== Career statistics ==
Legend
GP	Games played	GS	Games started	MPG	Minutes per game
FG%	Field goal percentage	3P%	3-point field goal percentage	FT%	Free throw percentage
RPG	Rebounds per game	APG	Assists per game	SPG	Steals per game
BPG	Blocks per game	PPG	Points per game	**Bold**	Career high

=== NBA ===
Year	Team	GP	GS	MPG	FG%	3P%	FT%	RPG	APG	SPG	BPG	PPG
2024–25	Miami	**3**	0	2.0	.000	.000	–	.7	.0	.3	.0	.0
2025–26	Sacramento	**3**	0	**14.3**	**.429**	.000	**1.000**	**1.0**	**3.3**	**1.7**	.0	**3.3**
Career		6	0	8.2	.333	.000	1.000	.8	1.7	1.0	.0	1.7

=== College ===
Year	Team	GP	GS	MPG	FG%	3P%	FT%	RPG	APG	SPG	BPG	PPG
2019–20	Colorado State	32	32	32.6	.467	.380	.816	3.1	4.5	.8	.1	13.3
2020–21	Colorado State	28	28	35.2	.465	.427	.865	**4.3**	5.4	1.1	.1	15.3
2021–22	Colorado State	31	31	34.7	.461	.377	**.902**	3.2	4.7	**1.2**	.1	14.7
2022–23	Colorado State	26	26	**36.8**	.465	.378	.862	3.4	6.7	.8	**.3**	**17.9**
2023–24	Colorado State	**36**	**36**	34.8	**.474**	**.440**	.836	3.2	**6.8**	**1.2**	.2	16.0
Career		153	153	34.7	.467	.402	.854	3.4	5.6	1.0	.1	15.4

== Personal life ==
Stevens' older brother, Barrington, played college basketball for South Alabama before embarking on a professional career.
