= 2021–22 Colorado State Rams men's basketball team =

American college basketball season

2021–22 Colorado State Rams men's basketball

Paradise Jam Tournament Champions

NCAA tournament, First Round
- Conference: Mountain West Conference

Ranking
- AP: No. 24
- Record: 25–6 (14–4 MW)
- Head coach: Niko Medved (4th season)
- Assistant coaches: Ali Farokhmanesh; Brian Cooley; Sam Jones
- Home arena: Moby Arena

2021–22 Mountain West Conference men's basketball standings
	Conf.				Overall
Team	W		L	PCT	W		L	PCT
No. 23 Boise State †	15	–	3	.833	27	–	8	.771
No. 24 Colorado State	14	–	4	.778	25	–	6	.806
San Diego State	13	–	4	.765	23	–	9	.719
Wyoming	13	–	5	.722	25	–	9	.735
UNLV	10	–	8	.556	18	–	14	.563
Fresno State	8	–	9	.471	23	–	13	.639
Utah State	8	–	10	.444	18	–	16	.529
Nevada	6	–	12	.333	13	–	18	.419
New Mexico	5	–	12	.294	13	–	19	.406
Air Force	4	–	13	.235	11	–	18	.379
San Jose State	1	–	17	.056	8	–	23	.258
† Conference tournament winner Rankings from AP poll

The 2021–22 Colorado State Rams men's basketball team represented Colorado State University for the 2021–22 NCAA Division I men's basketball season. The team was coached by Niko Medved, who was in his fourth season as head coach. The Rams played their home games at Moby Arena on CSU's main campus in Fort Collins, Colorado as members of the Mountain West Conference. They finished the season 25–6, 14–4 in Mountain West Play to finish in second place. As the No. 2 seed, they defeated Utah State in the quarterfinals of the Mountain West tournament before losing in the semifinals to San Diego State. They received an at-large bid to the NCAA tournament as the No. 6 seed in the South Region, where they were upset in the first round by Michigan.

== Previous season ==
In a season limited due to the ongoing COVID-19 pandemic, the Rams finished the 2020–21 season 20–8, 14–4 in Mountain West Conference play to finish in third place. They defeated Fresno State in the first round of the Mountain West tournament before losing to Utah State in the semifinals. They received an at-large bid to the National Invitation Tournament, where they defeated Buffalo and NC State to advance to the semifinals, where they lost to Memphis. In the third place game, they lost to Louisiana Tech.

== Offseason ==
=== Departures ===
Name	Number	Pos.	Height	Weight	Year	Hometown	Reason for departure
P. J. Byrd	5	G	6'1"	175	Junior	Houston, TX	Transferred to Southern

=== Incoming transfers ===
Name	Number	Pos.	Height	Weight	Year	Hometown	Previous school
Baylor Hebb	5	G	6'2"	180	Sophomore	Colleyville, TX	Transferred from Loyola–Chicago. Had four years of remaining eligibility.
Chandler Jacobs	13	G	6'3"	185	Graduate student	Missouri City, TX	Transferred from Dallas Baptist. Was eligible to play immediately since he graduated from Dallas Baptist.

=== 2021 recruiting class ===
College recruiting
Name	Hometown	School	Height	Weight	Commit date
Jalen Scott; PG	Surprise, AZ	Paradise Honors High School	6 ft 2 in (1.88 m)	165 lb (75 kg)	Jul 28, 2020
Jalen Scott; PG	Recruit ratings: Scout: Rivals: ESPN: (N/A)				
Jalen Lake; SG	Waxahachie, TX	Waxahachie High School	6 ft 4 in (1.93 m)	165 lb (75 kg)	Sep 24, 2020
Jalen Lake; SG	Recruit ratings: Scout: Rivals: ESPN: (N/A)				
Overall recruit ranking: Scout: – Rivals: –
Note: In many cases, Scout, Rivals, 247Sports, On3, and ESPN may conflict in their listings of height and weight.; In these cases, the average was taken. ESPN grades are on a 100-point scale.; Sources: "Colorado State Commit List for 2021". Rivals.; "Men's Basketball Recruiting". Scout.; "ESPN – Colorado State Rams Basketball Recruiting 2021". ESPN.; "Scout.com Team Recruiting Rankings". Scout.; "2021 Team Ranking". Rivals.

== Roster ==
2021–22 Colorado State Rams men's basketball team
Players
Coaches

Pos.	#	Name	Height	Weight	Year	Previous school	Hometown
G	0	Trace Young (W)	6 ft 3 in (1.91 m)	180 lb (82 kg)	So	Dripping Springs HS	Austin, TX
G	1	John Tonje	6 ft 5 in (1.96 m)	210 lb (95 kg)	Jr	Omaha Central HS	Omaha, NE
G	2	Jalen Scott	6 ft 2 in (1.88 m)	180 lb (82 kg)	Fr	Paradise Honors HS	Surprise, AZ
G	3	Kendle Moore	6 ft 0 in (1.83 m)	155 lb (70 kg)	Sr	Danville HS	Danville, IL
G	4	Isaiah Stevens	6 ft 0 in (1.83 m)	185 lb (84 kg)	Jr	Allen HS	Allen, TX
G	5	Baylor Hebb	6 ft 2 in (1.88 m)	180 lb (82 kg)	So	Heritage; Loyola–Chicago	Colleyville, TX
F/C	10	James Moors	6 ft 10 in (2.08 m)	260 lb (118 kg)	RS So	Westlake Boys HS	Auckland, New Zealand
F	11	Dischon Thomas	6 ft 8 in (2.03 m)	235 lb (107 kg)	Jr	Hillcrest Prep	Durham, NC
G	13	Chandler Jacobs	6 ft 3 in (1.91 m)	185 lb (84 kg)	GS	Elkins; Dallas Baptist	Missouri City, TX
G	15	Jalen Lake	6 ft 4 in (1.93 m)	190 lb (86 kg)	Fr	Waxahachie HS	Waxachachie, TX
F	21	David Roddy	6 ft 6 in (1.98 m)	255 lb (116 kg)	Jr	Breck School	Minneapolis, MN
F	22	Nick Bassett (W)	6 ft 5 in (1.96 m)	205 lb (93 kg)	Jr	Cheyenne Mountain HS; Nebraska Wesleyan	Colorado Springs, CO
G	23	Isaiah Rivera	6 ft 5 in (1.96 m)	210 lb (95 kg)	So	Geneseo HS	Geneseo, IL
F	31	Adam Thistlewood	6 ft 8 in (2.03 m)	225 lb (102 kg)	Sr	Golden HS	Golden, CO
C	35	Jacob Jennissen	7 ft 1 in (2.16 m)	240 lb (109 kg)	So	Sauk Centre Secondary	Sauk Centre, MN

Head coach

- Niko Medved (Minnesota)

Assistant coach(es)

- Ali Farokhmanesh (Northern Iowa)
- Brian Cooley (Nebraska Wesleyan)
- Sam Jones (Northwood)

Legend

- (C) Team captain
- (S) Suspended
- (I) Ineligible
- (W) Walk-on
- Injured
- Current redshirt

Roster

== Schedule and results ==
Date time, TV	Rank^{#}	Opponent^{#}	Result	Record	High points	High rebounds	High assists	Site (attendance) city, state
Exhibition
October 31, 2021*; 1:00 pm		Adams State	W 92–55	–	–	–	–	Moby Arena (2,544); Fort Collins, CO
Non-conference regular season
November 9, 2021*; 7:30 p.m., Stadium		Oral Roberts	W 109–80	1–0	31 – Tonje	10 – Thomas	6 – Stevens	Moby Arena (7,287); Fort Collins, CO
November 12, 2021*; 8:00 p.m., KCDO		Arkansas–Pine Bluff	W 91–71	2–0	28 – Roddy	13 – Roddy	6 – Stevens	Moby Arena (4,776); Fort Collins, CO
November 14, 2021*; 4:00 p.m., KCDO		Peru State	W 88–62	3–0	17 – Roddy	9 – Roddy	4 – Roddy	Moby Arena (2,904); Fort Collins, CO
November 19, 2021*; 11:00 a.m., ESPN3		vs. Bradley; Paradise Jam Tournament quarterfinals	W 66–60	4–0	30 – Roddy	10 – Roddy	7 – Stevens	Sports and Fitness Center; Saint Thomas, USVI
November 21, 2021*; 3:45 p.m., ESPN3		vs. Creighton; Paradise Jam Tournament semifinals	W 95–81	5–0	36 – Roddy	5 – Thistlewood	11 – Stevens	Sports and Fitness Center; Saint Thomas, USVI
November 22, 2021*; 6:00 p.m., ESPN3		vs. Northeastern; Paradise Jam tournament championship	W 71–61	6–0	27 – Roddy	7 – Roddy	8 – Stevens	Sports and Fitness Center; Saint Thomas, USVI
November 27, 2021*; 12:00 p.m., KCDO		Northern Colorado	W 88–79	7–0	20 – Tied	10 – Roddy	6 – Tied	Moby Arena (4,328); Fort Collins, CO
December 1, 2021*; 7:00 p.m., KCDO		Little Rock	W 86–55	8–0	12 – Tied	5 – Thistlewood	12 – Stevens	Moby Arena (4,147); Fort Collins, CO
December 4, 2021*; 2:00 p.m., Stadium		Saint Mary's	W 74–58	9–0	19 – Roddy	7 – Roddy	4 – Stevens	Moby Arena (7,004); Fort Collins, CO
December 11, 2021*; 12:00 p.m., ESPNU		vs. Mississippi State; Basketball Hall of Fame Classic	W 66–63	10–0	19 – Roddy	10 – Thomas	10 – Stevens	Dickies Arena; Fort Worth, TX
December 18, 2021*; 2:30 p.m., ESPN+	No. 23	vs. Tulsa; Hoop Hype XL College Basketball Showcase	Canceled due to COVID-19 protocols					Dickies Arena; Fort Worth, TX
December 21, 2021*; 5:00 p.m., SECN+	No. 21	vs. No. 10 Alabama; C. M. Newton Classic	Canceled due to COVID-19 protocols					Legacy Arena; Birmingham, AL
Mountain West regular season
January 4, 2022; 7:00 p.m., Stadium	No. 20	Air Force	W 67–59	11–0 (1–0)	15 – Stevens	12 – Roddy	2 – Tied	Moby Arena (4,977); Fort Collins, CO
January 8, 2022; 2:00 p.m., CBS	No. 20	at San Diego State	L 49–79	11–1 (1–1)	19 – Stevens	5 – Tied	2 – Rivera	Viejas Arena (10,323); San Diego, CA
January 11, 2022; 6:00 p.m., CBSSN		Utah State	W 77–72	12–1 (2–1)	24 – Roddy	9 – Jacobs	4 – Stevens	Moby Arena (4,578); Fort Collins, CO
January 15, 2022; 2:00 p.m., Stadium		at San José State	W 78–42	13–1 (3–1)	14 – Thomas	11 – Roddy	6 – Roddy	Provident Credit Union Event Center (1,326); San Jose, CA
January 19, 2022; 8:00 p.m., CBSSN		New Mexico	W 80–74	14–1 (4–1)	21 – Roddy	10 – Jacobs	7 – Roddy	Moby Arena (6,516); Fort Collins, CO
January 22, 2022; 12:00 p.m., FS1		at Air Force	W 73–53	15–1 (5–1)	18 – Stevens	9 – Roddy	3 – Roddy	Clune Arena (2,579); Colorado Springs, CO
January 25, 2022; 7:00 p.m., FS1		Nevada	W 77–66	16–1 (6–1)	18 – Roddy	8 – Roddy	6 – Roddy	Moby Arena (5,675); Fort Collins, CO
January 28, 2022; 7:00 p.m., CBSSN		UNLV	L 74–88	16–2 (6–2)	35 – Stevens	8 – Stevens	4 – Jacobs	Moby Arena (8,083); Fort Collins, CO
January 31, 2022; 6:00 p.m., FS1		at Wyoming; Border War	L 78–84 ^{OT}	16–3 (6–3)	23 – Roddy	6 – Jacobs	5 – Stevens	Arena-Auditorium (7,539); Laramie, WY
February 4, 2022; 7:00 p.m., FS1		San Diego State	W 58–57	17–3 (7–3)	22 – Roddy	9 – Roddy	4 – Tied	Moby Arena (8,063); Fort Collins, CO
February 8, 2022; 9:00 p.m., CBSSN		at Nevada	W 82–72	18–3 (8–3)	29 – Roddy	8 – Roddy	4 – Tied	Lawlor Events Center (6,279); Reno, NV
February 11, 2022; 7:30 p.m., CBSSN		Fresno State	W 65–50	19–3 (9–3)	21 – Roddy	7 – Roddy	8 – Roddy	Moby Arena (8,083); Fort Collins, CO
February 13, 2022; 2:00 p.m., FS1		at Boise State; Originally scheduled for Jan. 7	W 77–74 ^{OT}	20–3 (10–3)	18 – Roddy	7 – Roddy	5 – Stevens	ExtraMile Arena (6,684); Boise, ID
February 17, 2022; 7:00 p.m., Mountain West Network		at New Mexico; Originally scheduled for Dec. 28	W 83–68	21–3 (11–3)	31 – Roddy	9 – Roddy	7 – Stevens	The Pit (8,404); Albuquerque, NM
February 19, 2022; 6:00 p.m., CBSSN		at UNLV	L 51–72	21–4 (11–4)	14 – Stevens	5 – Moore	3 – Stevens	Thomas & Mack Center (6,153); Paradise, NV
February 23, 2022; 7:00 p.m., CBSSN		Wyoming; Border War	W 61–55	22–4 (12–4)	26 – Roddy	11 – Roddy	6 – Stevens	Moby Arena (8,085); Fort Collins, CO
February 26, 2022; 8:30 p.m., FS1		at Utah State	W 66–55	23–4 (13–4)	23 – Moore	10 – Roddy	3 – Stevens	Smith Spectrum (9,219); Logan, UT
March 5, 2022; 6:30 p.m., CBSSN		Boise State	W 71–68	24–4 (14–4)	23 – Roddy	5 – Tied	7 – Stevens	Moby Arena (8,083); Fort Collins, CO
Mountain West tournament
March 10, 2022; 7:00 p.m., CBSSN	(2) No. 23	vs. (7) Utah State; Quarterfinals	W 53–51	25–4	14 – Stevens	7 – Stevens	5 – Stevens	Thomas & Mack Center; Paradise, NV
March 11, 2022; 10:00 p.m., CBSSN	(2) No. 23	vs. (3) San Diego State; Semifinals	L 58–63	25–5	22 – Roddy	9 – Roddy	4 – Roddy	Thomas & Mack Center; Paradise, NV
NCAA tournament
March 17, 2022; 10:15 a.m., CBS	(6 S) No. 24	vs. (11 S) Michigan; First Round	L 63–75	25–6	15 – Thomas	6 – Roddy	4 – Tied	Gainbridge Fieldhouse (15,782); Indianapolis, IN
*Non-conference game. ^{#}Rankings from AP poll. (#) Tournament seedings in parentheses. All times are in Mountain Time.

=== Conference matchups ===
Colorado State finished the 2021–22 Mountain West Conference regular season with a 14–4 record, placing second in the conference's regular season standings behind Boise State.

In the 2022 Mountain West Conference men's basketball tournament, the Rams received a first-round bye as the tournament's second seed.

	Air Force	Boise State	Fresno State	Nevada	New Mexico	San Diego State	San Jose State	UNLV	Utah State	Wyoming
Colorado State	2–0	2–0	1–0	2–0	2–0	1–1	1–0	0–2	2–0	1–1

== Notable games ==
=== Regular season ===
- November 9, 2021, at Moby Arena vs. Oral Roberts: In the first game with fans at Moby Arena in over a year (due to the COVID-19 pandemic), Colorado State beat Oral Roberts — a team that made the Sweet Sixteen the previous year — 109–80. John Tonje led the Rams in scoring, setting a new career-high with 31 points.
- December 4, 2021, at Moby Arena vs. Saint Mary's: Undefeated 8–0 Colorado State hosted 8–1 Saint Mary's on December 4, 2021, at Moby Arena. Colorado State led 35–24 at halftime and held on to a double-digit lead for the entirety of the second half, winning 74–58. David Roddy led the scoring with 19 points.
- December 11, 2021, at Dickies Arena vs. Mississippi State: 9–0 Colorado State took on 6–2 Mississippi State on December 11, 2021, at neutral Dickies Arena in Fort Worth, Texas for the Basketball Hall of Fame Classic game. Mississippi State led 29–27 at halftime but Colorado State came back to outscore the Bulldogs in the second half and win the game 66–63. David Roddy led the scoring for the Rams, recording 19 points on a 72% field goal percentage. Colorado State was voted into the AP Top 25 following this game, entering the rankings at number 23.
- January 8, 2022, at Viejas Arena vs. San Diego State: 9–3 (1–0 conf) San Diego State hosted AP No. 20 11–0 (1–0 conf) Colorado State at Viejas Arena in San Diego on January 8, 2022. San Diego State led 36–32 at halftime before dominating the second half, outscoring Colorado State 43–17. The Aztecs won the game 79–49, giving the previously undefeated Rams their first loss of the season in embarrassing fashion. Matt Bradley led the Aztecs in scoring with 26 points, while Isaiah Stevens and David Roddy led the Rams with 19 and 17 points respectively.
- January 28, 2022, at Moby Arena vs. UNLV: 16–1 (6–1 conf) Colorado State hosted 11–9 (3–4 conf) UNLV at Moby Arena on January 28, 2022. After winning five Mountain West Conference games in a row following their loss to San Diego State, the Rams were upset by UNLV 88–74. Bryce Hamilton led UNLV in scoring, recording a new career-high of 42 points. Despite the loss, Isaiah Stevens also set a new career-high with 35 points, nearly matching the 39 points scored by the rest of the Rams combined.
- January 31, 2022, at Arena-Auditorium vs. Wyoming: Three days after being upset by UNLV, 16–2 (6–2 conf) Colorado State traveled north to Laramie, Wyoming to take on 16–3 (5–1 conf) Wyoming in the first of two annual Border War rivalry games. Regulation ended with the Rams and Cowboys tied at 70, and the Cowboys outscored the Rams 14–8 in overtime to hand the Rams their first back-to-back loss of the season. David Roddy led the Rams in scoring with 23 points before fouling out in overtime. Roddy made 9 of 15 shots — including 4 of 5 three-pointers — but struggled at the free-throw line, missing 2 of 3 shots including one that would've won the game at the end of regulation. Hunter Maldonado led the scoring for the Cowboys by recording a new career-high 35 points, which marked the second consecutive game where the Rams allowed an opposing player to set a new career-high. Graham Ike recorded 16 points and 8 rebounds for the Cowboys before fouling out in overtime along with Roddy.

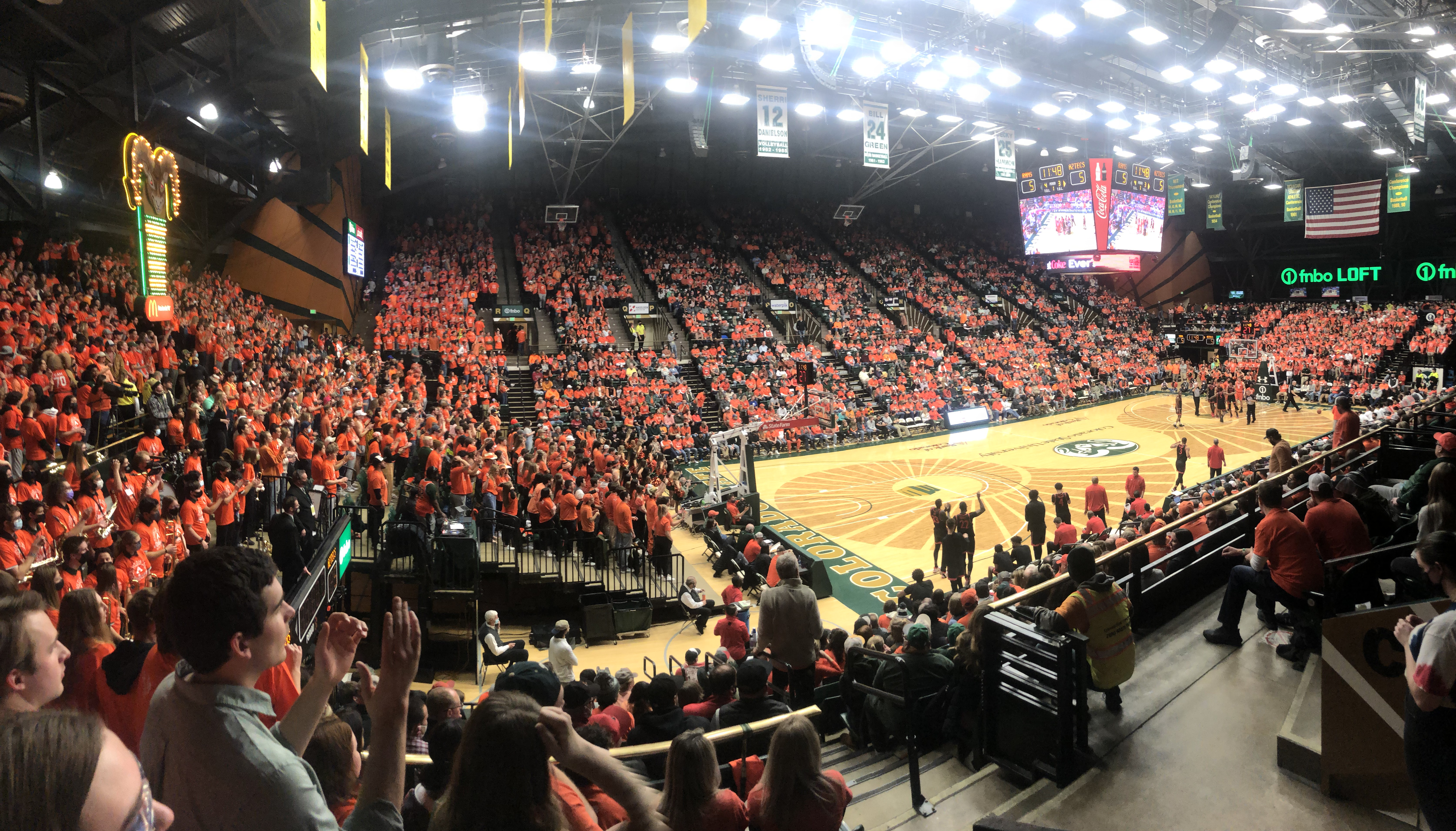
Moby Arena during an "orange out" game against San Diego State

- February 4, 2022, at Moby Arena vs. San Diego State: 16–3 (6–3 conf) Colorado State hosted 12–5 (4–2 conf) San Diego State in a rematch of the January 8 matchup that the Aztecs won by 30. Moby Arena sold out and "oranged out" for the game as Colorado State held its annual Aggie throwback game. The Rams led 23–18 after a low-scoring first half. Colorado State opened the second half strongly and led by as many as 20 points with 10 minutes left in the game, but San Diego State made a comeback in the last few minutes of the game as a result of multiple Colorado State turnovers and fouls. The Aztecs took their first lead of the entire game with 14 seconds left in the game before a David Roddy jumper and a James Moors defensive block ended the game 58–57 in favor of the Rams. Colorado State students stormed the court in celebration after the Rams won. Three players — Roddy (22), John Tonje (16), and James Moors (10) — scored all but 10 points for the Rams. Matt Bradley led the Aztecs with 27 points.
- February 11, 2022, at Moby Arena vs. Fresno State: Moby Arena sold out for the third consecutive game when 18–3 (8–3 conf) Colorado State hosted 16–7 (6–4 conf) Fresno State on February 11, 2022. Colorado State and Fresno State were third and fifth in Mountain West Conference basketball standings at the time, respectively. Fresno State led Colorado State at halftime 28–25, but the Rams bounced back to outscore the Bulldogs 40–22 in the second half to win 65–50. David Roddy led the Rams in points (21), assists (8), and rebounds (7). Isaiah Stevens (14), James Moors (11), and John Tonje (10) also scored in the double figures for Colorado State. Orlando Robinson led the Bulldogs with 24 points.
- February 13, 2022, at ExtraMile Arena vs. Boise State: Two days after beating Fresno State in Fort Collins, 19–3 (9–3 conf) Colorado State traveled to Boise, Idaho to take on 19–5 (10–1 conf) Boise State. Prior to the game, Boise State was tied with Wyoming for first place in the Mountain West at 10–1, while Colorado State was third at 9–3. Colorado State got off to a strong start, reaching a double-digit lead midway through the first half before Boise State came back to shrink it to a two-point CSU lead at halftime. Regulation ended tied at 67 after a back-and-forth second half. In overtime, Max Rice scored six of Boise State's seven points while Chandler Jones scored six of Colorado State's 10 points, and the Rams won the game 77–74. David Roddy led the Rams with 18 points, while Chandler Jacobs (16) and Isaiah Stevens (14) also scored in the double figures. Boise State was led by Max Rice and Marcus Shaver Jr., who both recorded 17 points, as well as Tyson Degenhart with 16 points.
- February 19, 2022, at Thomas & Mack Center vs. UNLV: 21–3 (11–3 conf) Colorado State traveled to Las Vegas on February 19, 2022, seeking revenge against 15–11 (7–6 conf) UNLV for their upset victory in Fort Collins a few weeks prior. However, the Rams struggled throughout the entire game, scoring just 24 points in the first half and 51 points in total on a 34.6 field goal percentage. UNLV led by 11 at halftime and won the game 72–51 to sweep the Rams in their regular season series — the only team to beat Colorado State more than once in the 2021–22 season. Isaiah Stevens led the Rams with 14 points, while Bryce Hamilton led the Rebels with 20 points.
- February 23, 2022, at Moby Arena vs. Wyoming: 21–4 (11–4 conf) Colorado State hosted 22–4 (11–2 conf) Wyoming on February 23, 2022, in front of another sold-out crowd at Moby Arena for the second annual game of the Border War rivalry. While the score remained close throughout most of the game, Colorado State held a lead for the majority of the game, leading 31–27 at halftime and winning the game 61–55. David Roddy led the Rams with 26 points, while Chandler Jacobs recorded 18 points off the bench. Drake Jeffries led scoring for the Cowboys with 22 points.
- March 5, 2022, at Moby Arena vs. Boise State: For Colorado State's senior night and final regular season game, the 23–4 (13–4 conf) Rams hosted 24–6 (15–2 conf) Boise State, the 2021–22 Mountain West Conference regular season champions. Moby Arena sold out for the fifth consecutive game and all three CSU seniors — Kendle Moore, Chandler Jacobs, and Adam Thistlewood — were in the Ram's starting lineup. Colorado State led 41–36 at halftime and went on to win the game 71–68, sweeping the season series against the Broncos. David Roddy led the Rams with 23 points while Kendle Moore scored 19 points on his senior night. Abu Kigab led the Broncos with 15 points.

=== Paradise Jam tournament ===
- Quarterfinals: November 19, 2021, at Sports and Fitness Center vs. Bradley: In the first game of the 2021 Paradise Jam Tournament, Colorado State beat Bradley 66–60. The Rams were down 27–21 at halftime but bounced back to score 45 points in the second half to win the game. The Rams were led by David Roddy, who recorded a new career-high of 30 points.
- Semifinals: November 21, 2021, at Sports and Fitness Center vs. Creighton: In the semifinals game of the 2021 Paradise Jam Tournament, Colorado State beat previously undefeated Creighton 96–81. Two days after David Roddy set a new career-high in scoring against Bradley, he sunk seven of ten three-pointers on his way to setting a new career-high of 36 points. The Rams as a whole made 20 three-pointers, a new school record.
- Final: November 22, 2021, at Sports and Fitness Center vs. Northeastern: After trailing Northeastern by 20 points early in the second half of the tournament's championship game, the Rams put together a comeback and outscored the Huskies 47–17 in the final 17 minutes to win the game — and the 2021 Paradise Jam Tournament — 71–61. David Roddy, who scored 27 points — and averaged 31 points a game — was named the MVP of the tournament.

=== Mountain West tournament ===
- Quarterfinals: March 10, 2022, at Thomas & Mack Center vs. TBD:
