= Bill Green (basketball) =

American basketball player (1940–1994)

Personal information
- Born: December 8, 1940 Gadsden, Alabama, U.S.
- Died: March 15, 1994 (aged 53)
- Listed height: 6 ft 6 in (1.98 m)
- Listed weight: 230 lb (104 kg)

Career information
- High school: Carver (Gadsden, Alabama)
- College: Colorado State (1960–1963)
- NBA draft: 1963: 1st round, 8th overall pick
- Drafted by: Boston Celtics
- Playing career: 1964–1972
- Position: Forward

Career history
- 1964–1965: Scranton Miners
- 1965–1969: Wilkes-Barre Barons
- 1969–1970: Hamden Bics
- 1970–1972: Scranton Apollos

Career highlights
- 2× EPBL/EBA champion (1969, 1971); All-EPBL First Team (1968); AAU All-American (1963); Consensus second-team. All-American (1963); No. 24 retired by Colorado State Rams
- Stats at Basketball Reference

William E. Green (December 8, 1940 – March 15, 1994) was an American basketball player. He was a college basketball standout for Colorado State University (CSU) between 1960–61 and 1962–63. A 6 ft 6 in (1.98 m), 230 lb center, Green was CSU's first-ever NCAA All-American when he was named to the consensus second team in 1963. He led the Rams in both scoring and rebounding for all three seasons and remains etched in the school's record book for both categories. He scored 1,682 points and grabbed 726 rebounds which remain third- and seventh-all time, respectively, through the 2024–25 season. The top two single game scoring records belong to Green: 48 points versus Denver and 44 against Regis. Every season that Green suited up for CSU they qualified for a postseason tournament. In his sophomore and junior years, the Rams earned berths into the National Invitation Tournament. They reached the quarterfinals and first round, respectively. During his senior year, the Rams lost in the first round of the 1963 NCAA Tournament to Oklahoma City, 70–67. For his three-year career, Green averaged 22.1 points and 9.6 rebounds per game.

== Fear of flying ==
After Green's collegiate career ended and he graduated from CSU in the spring of 1963, the Boston Celtics selected him in the first round (8th overall) of the 1963 NBA draft. It was a foregone conclusion that he would play a professional sport, as Green was also drafted by the Boston Red Sox of Major League Baseball (MLB) and the Dallas Cowboys of the National Football League (NFL) that year. Green ultimately never played any sport professionally due to an ever-increasing fear of flying. The fear had emerged gradually throughout his college career, and after a rough flight back to CSU from Utah during his senior year he realized how terrified he really was of flying.

The Celtics had tried to convince Green to work through his fear during the 1963–64 preseason. Professional help did not work, and Hall of Fame coach Red Auerbach allowed him to take a bus out to St. Louis, Missouri for a preseason game on the condition that Green flew back. When it came time to go home, he could not step on the plane. Green later said, "The fear just built to the point where I couldn't take it anymore. I made up my mind: I wouldn't do it. Auerbach told me to go work on it [the fear] and come back later." Green quit the Celtics right before the regular season began and never returned to attempt professional basketball (or any other professional sport), knowing that in order to play he would have to get over his fear of flying, which was something he could not do.

Green played in the Eastern Professional Basketball League (EPBL) / Eastern Basketball Association (EBA) for the Scranton Miners / Apollos, Wilkes-Barre Barons and Hamden Bics from 1964 to 1972. He won EPBL/EBA championships with the Barons in 1969 and the Apollos in 1971. Green was selected to the All-EPBL First Team in 1968.

== Later life ==
Realizing that any future as a professional athlete was out of the question, Green earned a master's degree from Brooklyn College. He taught in several New York City public schools afterward, and then in 1971 became the principal of Jordan L. Mott School in the South Bronx. The school, an extremely dangerous and under-performing one, greatly turned around with Green's direction. He enacted stringent rules that made students earn certain grades and reach specified numbers of "class points" to be able to even attend the school's basketball games, let alone play in them. Green also created an atmosphere of intellectual competition whereby different classes within each grade would compete against one another—literally sitting desk-to-desk—and earn points for their class based on the outcomes. He would then post the school's weekly updated class and grade rankings in the hallways, which the students would intently follow. His methods, although unconventional, worked, and even though Jordan L. Mott School was pulling its students from two of the poorest performing elementary schools in New York City, most students were in the top 11% of all city public schools in terms of their reading level by the time they left Mott (after 8th grade). He had earned myriad awards honoring his school's success.

Green died on March 15, 1994, at age 53.
