= David Roddy =

American basketball player (born 2001)

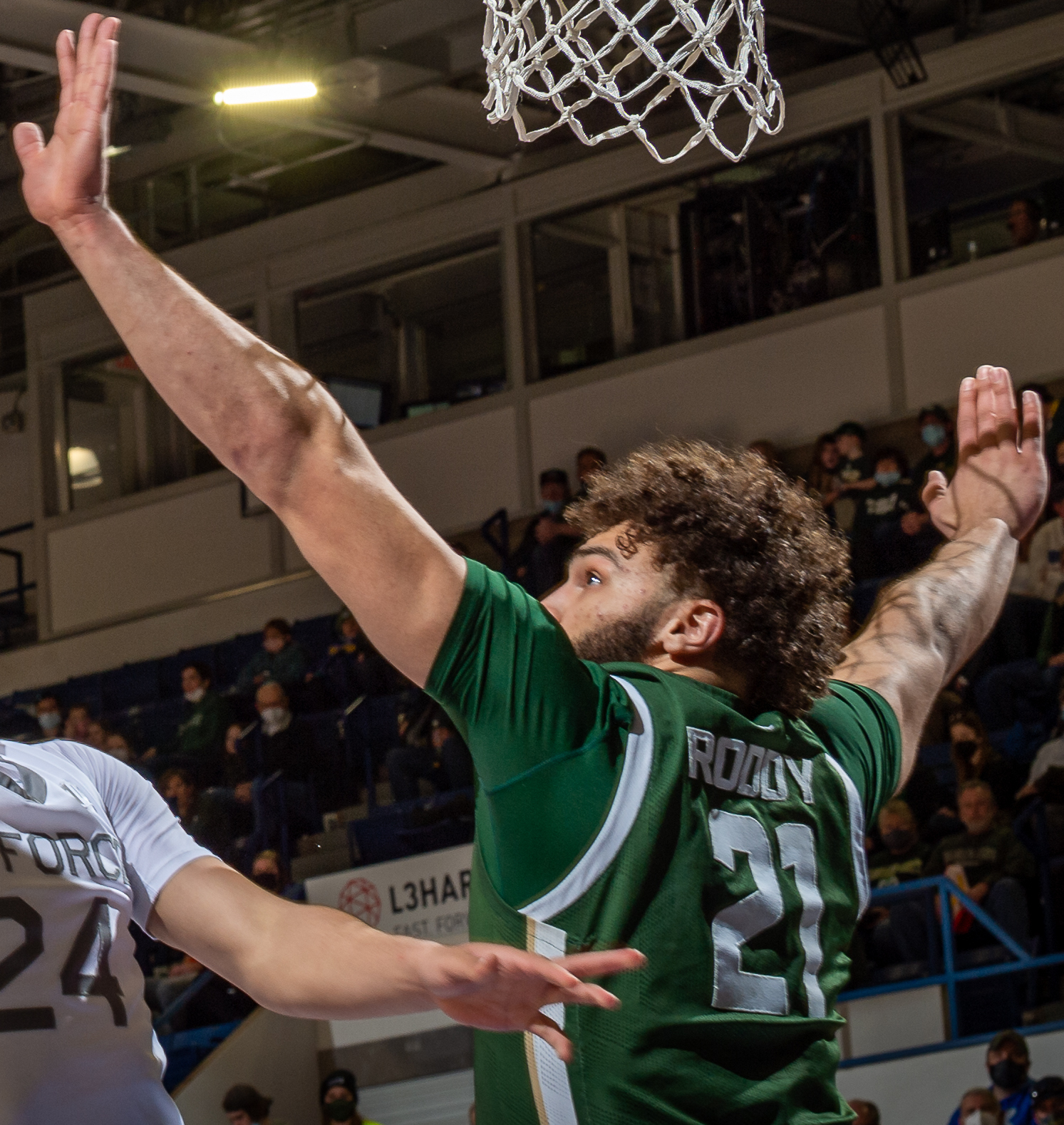
- Roddy with Colorado State in 2022

No. 21 – Hapoel Jerusalem
- Position: Power forward / small forward
- League: Israeli Basketball Premier League; EuroCup

Personal information
- Born: March 27, 2001 (age 25) Minneapolis, Minnesota, U.S.
- Listed height: 6 ft 5 in (1.96 m)
- Listed weight: 255 lb (116 kg)

Career information
- High school: Breck School (Golden Valley, Minnesota)
- College: Colorado State (2019–2022)
- NBA draft: 2022: 1st round, 23rd overall pick
- Drafted by: Philadelphia 76ers
- Playing career: 2022–present

Career history
- 2022–2024: Memphis Grizzlies
- 2022–2023: →Memphis Hustle
- 2024: Phoenix Suns
- 2024–2025: Atlanta Hawks
- 2025: Philadelphia 76ers
- 2025: →Delaware Blue Coats
- 2025: Houston Rockets
- 2025: →Rio Grande Valley Vipers
- 2025–2026: Raptors 905
- 2026: Denver Nuggets
- 2026: →Grand Rapids Gold
- 2026–present: Hapoel Jerusalem

Career highlights
- Mountain West Player of the Year (2022); 2× First-team All-Mountain West (2021, 2022); AP Honorable mention All-American (2022)
- Stats at NBA.com
- Stats at Basketball Reference

David Michael Roddy (born March 27, 2001) is an American professional basketball player for Hapoel Jerusalem of the Israeli Basketball Premier League and the EuroCup. He played college basketball for the Colorado State Rams, and later played in the NBA.

In high school, Roddy played basketball, football, and track and field, receiving Division I scholarship offers for the first two, and named named the 2019 Minnesota Male High School Athlete of the Year. He ultimately chose to play college basketball for Colorado State. With the Rams, he was named to the First-team All-Mountain West in his sophomore and junior seasons, and was named the Mountain West Player of the Year in his junior season.

He was drafted 23rd overall in the 2022 NBA draft by the Philadelphia 76ers, but was later traded to the Memphis Grizzlies. He has also played in the NBA for the Phoenix Suns, Atlanta Hawks, 76ers, Houston Rockets, and Denver Nuggets.

== High school career ==
Roddy was a three-sport athlete at Breck School in Golden Valley, Minnesota, competing in basketball, football, and track and field, and was voted team, captain in all three sports. He was named named the 2019 Minnesota Male High School Athlete of the Year for his performance in football, basketball, and track & field.

In his junior season, in basketball he averaged 25.4 points and 12.9 rebounds per game. As a senior, in basketball he averaged 29.7 points (second in the state), 16.6 rebounds, 3.8 assists, and 2.2 blocks per game. He was named named to the Star Tribune All-Metro First Team and the All-USA Today Minnesota Second Team in basketball.

Roddy was an all-state quarterback in football. He was a finalist in Minnesota for Mr. Football, and was named to the Minnesota High School Football All-State team.

He also competed in track and field in both shotput and discus, and won a Class A state title in the discus. In his junior year, he placed fourth in Minnesota in discus, and fifth in shot put. In the 2019 Minnesota state championship, he came in second place in the shot, and won the discus Minnesota state title by nearly four feet.

He committed to play college basketball for Colorado State over offers from Minnesota, Northwestern, and other NCAA Division I programs. Before committing to college basketball, Roddy also received football scholarship offers from multiple Division I programs.

== College career ==
As a freshman in 2019-20, in 32 games Roddy averaged 25.6 minutes, 11.4 points, 5.6 rebounds, 1.8 assists, and 0.8 blocks (7th) per game for Colorado State, shooting 46.5% from the floor. On January 22, 2020, Roddy recorded a freshman season-high 26 points and eight rebounds in a 86–68 win over Fresno State.

As a sophomore in 2020-21, in 28 games he averaged 31.4 minutes, 15.9 points (6th in the conference), 9.4 rebounds (2nd), and 2.6 assists per game, shooting 51.2% from the field (2nd), and was named first-team All-Mountain West (by both coaches and media), and NABC All-District (17) First Team. On January 27, 2021, Roddy posted 27 points and 15 rebounds in a 78–56 victory over Boise State.

Roddy had a career year as a junior during 2021–22 season. He went 57.1% on field goals (leading the conference) and 43.8% on three-pointers — up from 51.2% and 27.8% in 2020–21. He averaged 32.3 minutes, 19.2 points (3rd in the conference), 7.5 rebounds (6th), 2.9 assists, 1.2 steals, and 1.1 blocks (7th) a game. Roddy was named the Mountain West Player of the Year (both coaches and media), as well as first-team All-Mountain West (both coaches and media) for the second consecutive year. He was also named NABC All-District (17) First Team, All-American Honorable Mention, Mountain West All-Tournament Team, Paradise Jam Tournament MVP, Paradise Jam All-Tournament Team, USBWA Honorable Mention Team, USBWA District VIII Player of the Year, and USBWA All-District Team (VIII). Roddy led the Rams to their first NCAA tournament appearance since 2013 before declaring for the 2022 NBA draft on March 30, 2022.

== Professional career ==
=== Memphis Grizzlies (2022–2024) ===
In the 2022 NBA draft, Roddy was drafted 23rd overall by the Philadelphia 76ers on behalf of the Memphis Grizzlies as part of a trade that sent Roddy and Danny Green to the Grizzlies in exchange for De'Anthony Melton. On July 2, 2022, Roddy signed his rookie scale contract with the Grizzlies. Roddy made his NBA debut on October 19, grabbing two rebounds in a 115–112 overtime win over the New York Knicks. On March 11, 2023, Roddy scored a career-high 24 points in a 112–108 win over the Dallas Mavericks. In 2022-23 with the Hustle, in 4 games he averaged 33.0 minutes, 20.5 points, 4.0 rebounds, and 2.8 assists per game. In 2022-23 with the Grizzlies, in 70 games he averaged 18.0 minutes, 6.6 points, 2.8 rebounds, and 0.8 assists per game.

In 2023-24 with the Grizzlies, in 48 games he averaged 23.2 minutes, 8.4 points, 4.2 rebounds, and 1.6 assists per game.

=== Phoenix Suns (2024) ===
On February 8, 2024, Roddy was traded to the Phoenix Suns in a three-team trade involving the Brooklyn Nets alongside Royce O'Neale, sending Chimezie Metu and Yuta Watanabe to Memphis and Keita Bates-Diop and Jordan Goodwin to Brooklyn. Roddy made his team debut six days later on Valentine's Day, scoring 5 points and getting one rebound in 10 minutes of action in a 116–100 win over the Detroit Pistons. In 2024 with the team, in 17 games he averaged 3.7 minutes, 1.3 points, 0.6 rebounds, and 0.2 assists per game.

=== Atlanta Hawks (2024–2025) ===
On July 29, 2024, Roddy was traded to the Atlanta Hawks in exchange for E. J. Liddell. On February 7, 2025, Roddy was waived by the Hawks. In 2024-25 with the team, in 27 games he averaged 12.8 minutes, 4.5 points, 2.6 rebounds, and 1.1 assists per game, shooting 47.3% from the floor, and 81.8% from the free throw line.

=== Philadelphia 76ers (2025) ===
On February 9, 2025, Roddy signed a 10-day contract with the Philadelphia 76ers, but was assigned to the Delaware Blue Coats of the NBA G League shortly after. He played one game with the Blue Coats, in which he played 39.9 minutes, and scored 31 points while pulling down 8 rebounds. On February 20, 2025, Roddy signed a two-way contract with the 76ers. On February 28, 2025, Roddy was waived by the 76ers after signing Jalen Hood-Schifino to a two-way contract. In 2025 with Philadelphia, in three games he averaged 9.5 minutes, 6.0 points, 3.0 rebounds, and 1.0 assists per game.

=== Houston Rockets (2025) ===
On March 3, 2025, Roddy signed a two-way contract with the Houston Rockets. In 2025 with the Rio Grande Valley Vipers, in 11 games he averaged 27.7 minutes, 15.4 points, 5.1 rebounds, and 2.8 assists per game, while shooting 50.4% from the field. In 2025 with Houston, in three games he averaged 11.6 minutes, 4.3 points, 1.7 rebounds, and 0.7 assists per game.

On July 6, 2025, Roddy was traded back to the Atlanta Hawks, as part of an expanded seven-team trade between the Brooklyn Nets, Los Angeles Lakers, Phoenix Suns, Golden State Warriors, Minnesota Timberwolves, and Houston Rockets who acquired Kevin Durant. Roddy was waived the following day.

=== Raptors 905 (2025–2026) ===
On July 10, 2025, Roddy signed an Exhibit 10 contract with the Toronto Raptors. On October 16, Roddy was waived by Toronto during final roster cuts. Roddy signed with the Raptors 905 of the NBA G League on November 6, and played 22 games for them in which he averaged 31.4 minutes, 14.6 points, 6.9 rebounds, 4.3 assists, and 0.9 steals, while shooting 47.8% from the field.

=== Denver Nuggets (2026) ===
On March 4, 2026, Roddy signed a two-way contract with the Denver Nuggets, playing out the rest of the 2025–26 season split between Denver and the Grand Rapids Gold. Playing for Grand Rapids, in one game he scored 23 points and pulled down 10 rebounds, while adding 6 assists and 4 steals. Roddy made five appearances for the Nuggets, averaging 14.6 minutes, 8.0 points, and 4.0 rebounds, while shooting 15-for-30 from the field, and 7-for-7 from the line.

=== Hapoel Jerusalem (2026–present) ===
On July 24, 2026, Roddy signed a 1+1 contract with Hapoel Jerusalem of the Israeli Basketball Premier League and the EuroCup, marking the first European move of his career.

== Career statistics ==
Legend
GP	Games played	GS	Games started	MPG	Minutes per game
FG%	Field goal percentage	3P%	3-point field goal percentage	FT%	Free throw percentage
RPG	Rebounds per game	APG	Assists per game	SPG	Steals per game
BPG	Blocks per game	PPG	Points per game	**Bold**	Career high

=== NBA ===
==== Regular season ====
Year	Team	GP	GS	MPG	FG%	3P%	FT%	RPG	APG	SPG	BPG	PPG
2022–23	Memphis	**70**	4	18.0	.429	.307	.631	2.8	.8	.4	.3	6.7
2023–24	Memphis	48	**13**	**23.2**	.402	.301	.687	**4.2**	**1.6**	.5	.2	**8.4**
2023–24	Phoenix	17	0	3.7	.435	.125	**1.000**	.6	.2	.1	.0	1.3
2024–25	Atlanta	27	3	12.8	.473	**.372**	.818	2.6	1.1	.4	.3	4.5
2024–25	Philadelphia	3	0	9.7	.421	.182	.0	3.0	1.0	.7	.0	6.0
2024–25	Houston	3	0	11.7	.385	.143	.500	1.7	.7	.0	.3	4.3
2025–26	Denver	5	0	14.6	**.500**	.273	**1.000**	4.0	.8	**.8**	.2	8.0
Career		173	20	16.9	.424	.301	.693	2.9	1.0	.4	.2	6.3

==== Playoffs ====
Year	Team	GP	GS	MPG	FG%	3P%	FT%	RPG	APG	SPG	BPG	PPG
2023	Memphis	**6**	0	**12.6**	.276	.300	1.000	**2.8**	**.7**	.0	**.3**	**3.8**
2024	Phoenix	2	0	1.4	—	—	—	.0	.0	.0	.0	.0
Career		8	0	9.8	.276	.300	1.000	2.1	.5	.0	.3	2.9

=== College ===
Year	Team	GP	GS	MPG	FG%	3P%	FT%	RPG	APG	SPG	BPG	PPG
2019–20	Colorado State	**32**	19	25.6	.465	.195	.739	5.6	1.8	.6	.8	11.4
2020–21	Colorado State	28	26	31.5	.512	.278	**.789**	**9.4**	2.6	.9	.7	15.9
2021–22	Colorado State	31	**31**	**32.9**	**.571**	**.438**	.691	7.5	**2.9**	**1.2**	**1.1**	**19.2**
Career		91	76	29.9	.522	.319	.739	7.4	2.4	.9	.8	15.5
