= Arena-Auditorium =

Arena in Laramie, Wyoming, US

- "Pimple on the Prairie", "Dome of Doom", "Double A"
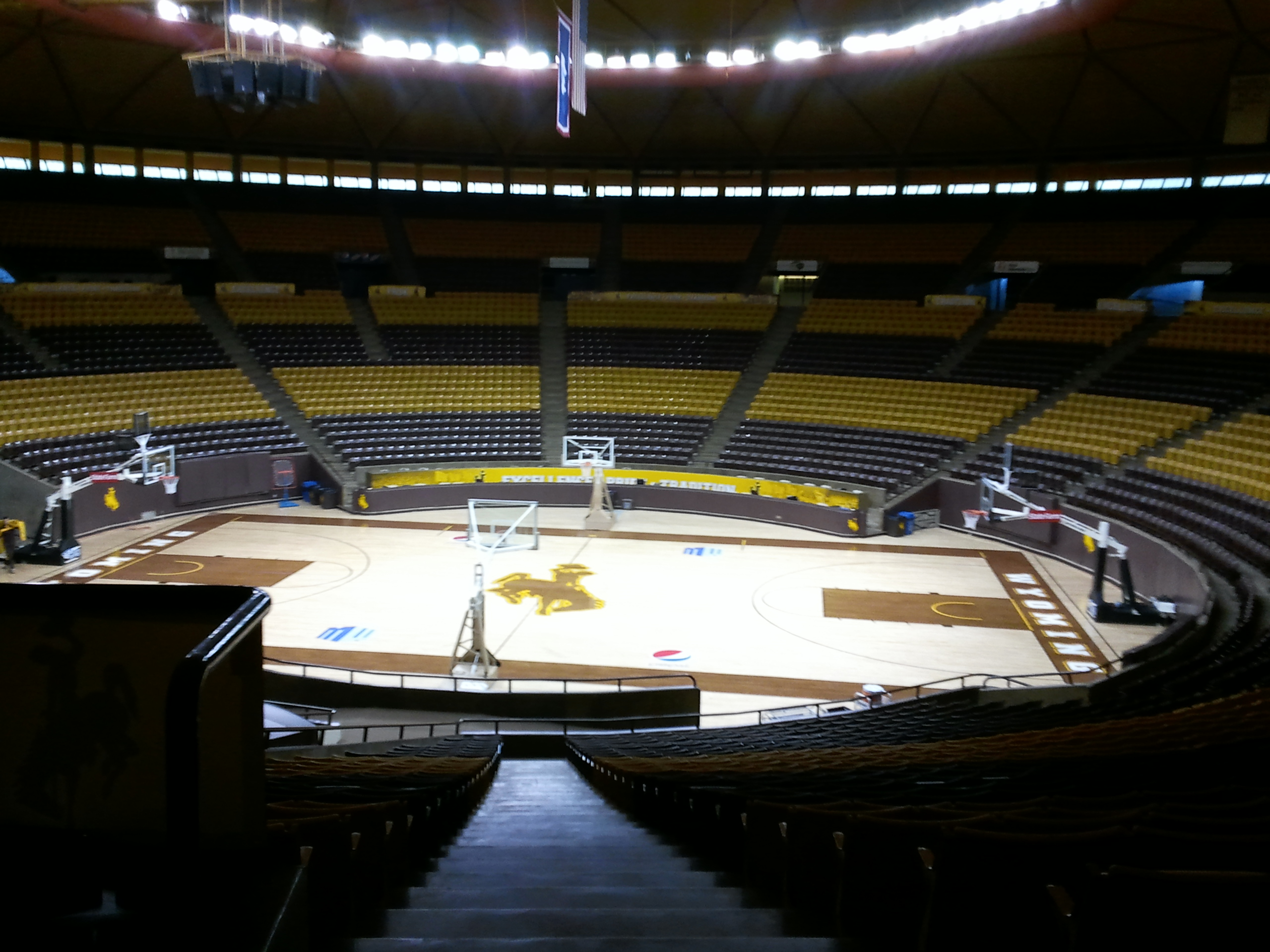
- Interior view of the Arena-Auditorium, 2011

- Location in Wyoming Location in the United States
- Location: 1000 East University Avenue; Laramie, WY 82071
- Coordinates: 41°18′48.04″N 105°34′9.91″W
- Owner: University of Wyoming
- Operator: University of Wyoming
- Capacity: 15,028 (1982-2014); 11,612 (2014-present)

Construction
- Opened: February 20, 1982
- Cost: $15 million
- Architects: Arena Associates (Corbett Associates of Jackson & Dehnert, Richardson, & Bensman of Lander)

Tenant
- Wyoming Cowboys

Arena-Auditorium is a 11,612-seat multi-purpose arena in Laramie, Wyoming. The arena opened in 1982 and has since been the home of the University of Wyoming Cowboys basketball team, as well as home to the Cowgirls basketball team since 2003. It replaced the previous home of Cowboys basketball, War Memorial Fieldhouse.

Nicknamed the "Pimple on the Prairie", "Dome of Doom", and the "Double A," the Arena-Auditorium is the highest NCAA Division I college basketball court in the nation, built at an elevation of 7,220 ft (2,201 m). The facility hosted the 1986 and 1991 Western Athletic Conference men's basketball tournaments. It also hosted the West Regional of the 2006 NCAA Wrestling Tournament. The largest crowd to watch a basketball game at the Arena-Auditorium was on March 2, 2002, when Wyoming played Utah in men's basketball. Wyoming won that game by a final score of 57–56 in front of 16,089 people.

In 2007 the Cowgirls hosted 5 Women's National Invitation Tournament (WNIT) games at the Double A, plus the March 31 WNIT championship game in which Wyoming beat the Wisconsin Badgers 72–56. For the title game against Wisconsin, the women's basketball team sold out the Double A in less than 14 hours following their semi-final victory against Kansas State. The 15,462 in attendance was largest crowd ever for a women's basketball game played at the University of Wyoming, as well as the second biggest crowd ever at the Double A and second biggest in WNIT tournament history.

Then-Senator Barack Obama spoke to a capacity crowd at the Double A on March 7, 2008. The speech was as a part of the future President's campaign to win the Wyoming Democratic Party caucus, which he did win the following day.

== See also ==
- List of NCAA Division I basketball arenas
