= 2021–22 NCAA Division I men's basketball rankings =

Rankings for the 2021-22 NCAA men's basketball season

- Season: 2021–22
- NCAA Tournament: 2022
- Preseason No. 1: Gonzaga
- NCAA Tournament Champions: Kansas
NCAA Division I men's basketball rankings


Two human polls make up the 2021–22 NCAA Division I men's basketball rankings, the AP Poll and the Coaches Poll, in addition to various publications' preseason polls.

== Legend ==
	Increase in ranking
	Decrease in ranking
	New to rankings from previous week
Italics	Number of first place votes
(#–#)	Win–loss record
т	Tied with team above or below also with this symbol

== AP Poll ==
	Preseason Oct 18	Week 2 Nov 15	Week 3 Nov 22	Week 4 Nov 29	Week 5 Dec 6	Week 6 Dec 13	Week 7 Dec 20	Week 8 Dec 27	Week 9 Jan 3	Week 10 Jan 10	Week 11 Jan 17	Week 12 Jan 24	Week 13 Jan 31	Week 14 Feb 7	Week 15 Feb 14	Week 16 Feb 21	Week 17 Feb 28	Week 18 Mar 7	Final Mar 14	
1.	Gonzaga (55)	Gonzaga (2−0) (55)	Gonzaga (4−0) (55)	Duke (7−0) (51)	Purdue (8−0) (61)	Baylor (10−0) (61)	Baylor (10−0) (60)	Baylor (11−0) (61)	Baylor (13−0) (61)	Baylor (15−0) (61)	Gonzaga (14–2) (25)	Auburn (18–1) (45)	Auburn (20–1) (49)	Auburn (22–1) (48)	Gonzaga (21–2) (56)	Gonzaga (23–2) (61)	Gonzaga (24–3) (46)	Gonzaga (24–3) (52)	Gonzaga (26–3) (54)	1.
2.	UCLA (8)	UCLA (2−0) (6)	UCLA (4−0) (5)	Purdue (6−0) (9)	Baylor (8−0)	Duke (7−1)	Duke (10−1)	Duke (11−1)	Duke (11−1)	Gonzaga (12−2)	Auburn (16–1) (36)	Gonzaga (15–2) (15)	Gonzaga (17–2) (12)	Gonzaga (19–2) (13)	Auburn (23–2) (4)	Arizona (24–2)	Arizona (25–3)	Arizona (28–3) (6)	Arizona (31–3) (7)	2.
3.	Kansas	Kansas (2−0)	Purdue (5−0) (1)	Gonzaga (6−1) (1)	Duke (7−1)	Purdue (9−1)	Purdue (10−1)	Purdue (11−1)	Purdue (12−1)	UCLA (10−1)	Arizona (14–1)	Arizona (16–1) (1)	UCLA (16–2)	Purdue (20–3)	Arizona (22–2)	Auburn (24–3)	Baylor (24–5) (4)	Baylor (26–5) (3)	Kansas (28–6)	3.
4.	Villanova	Michigan (2−0)	Kansas (3−0)	Baylor (7−0)	UCLA (7−1)	UCLA (8−1)	Gonzaga (8−2)	Gonzaga (10−2)	Gonzaga (11−2)	Auburn (14−1)	Purdue (14–2)	Baylor (17–2)	Purdue (18–3)	Arizona (19–2)	Kentucky (21–4)	Purdue (24–4)	Duke (25–4) (11)	Auburn (27–4)	Baylor (26–6)	4.
5.	Texas	Villanova (1−1)	Duke (5−0)	UCLA (6−1)	Gonzaga (7−2)	Gonzaga (8−2)	UCLA (8−1)	UCLA (8−1)	UCLA (8−1)	USC (13−0)	Baylor (15–2)	Kansas (16–2)	Kentucky (17–4)	Kentucky (19–4)	Purdue (22–4)	Kansas (22–4)	Auburn (25–4)	Kentucky (25–6)	Tennessee (26–7)	5.
6.	Michigan	Purdue (2−0)	Baylor (4−0)	Villanova (4−2)	Villanova (6−2)	Alabama (8−1)	Arizona (11−0) (1)	Kansas (9−1)	Kansas (11−1)	Arizona (12−1)	Duke (14–2)	Purdue (16–3)	Houston (18–2)	Houston (20–2)	Kansas (20–4)	Kentucky (22–5)	Kansas (23–5)	Kansas (25–6)	Villanova (26–7)	6.
7.	Purdue	Duke (3−0)	Villanova (3−2)	Texas (4−1)	Texas (6−1)	Kansas (8−1)	Kansas (9−1)	USC (12−0)	USC (12−0)	Purdue (13−2)	Kansas (14–2)	UCLA (13–2)т	Arizona (17–2)	Duke (19–3)	Baylor (21–4)	Duke (23–4)	Kentucky (23–6)	Duke (26–5)	Kentucky (26–7)	7.
8.	Baylor	Texas (1−1)	Texas (3−1)	Kansas (5−1)	Kansas (6−1)	Arizona (9−0)	USC (12−0)	Iowa State (12−0)	Arizona (11−1)	Duke (12−2)	Wisconsin (14–2)	Houston (17–2)т	Baylor (18–3)	Kansas (19–3)	Providence (21–2)	Villanova (21–6)	Purdue (24–5)	Villanova (23–7)	Auburn (27–5)	8.
9.	Duke	Baylor (1−0)	Memphis (4−0)	Kentucky (5−1)	Alabama (7−1)	Villanova (7−3)	Iowa State (11−0)	Arizona (11−1)	Auburn (12−1)	Kansas (12−2)	UCLA (11–2)	Duke (15–3)	Duke (17–3)	Texas Tech (18–5)	Duke (21–4)	Texas Tech (21–6)	Providence (24–3)	Purdue (25–6) т	Duke (27–7)	9.
10.	Kentucky	Illinois (2−0)	Alabama (4–0) т	Arkansas (6−0)	Kentucky (6−1)	USC (10−0)	Alabama (9−2)	Michigan State (10−2)	Michigan State (12−2)	Michigan State (13−2)	Houston (15–2)	Michigan State (15–3)	Kansas (17–3)	Baylor (19–4)	Villanova (19–6)	Baylor (21–5)	Wisconsin (23–5)	Tennessee (23–7) т	Purdue (27–7)	10.
11.	Illinois	Memphis (2−0)	Kentucky (3–1) т	Arizona (6−0)	Arizona (7−0)	Iowa State (10−0)	Michigan State (9−2)	Auburn (11−1)	Iowa State (12−1)	Houston (14−2)	Villanova (13–4)	Wisconsin (15–3)	Wisconsin (17–3)	Providence (20–2)	Texas Tech (19–6)	Providence (22–3)	Villanova (21–7)	Providence (24–4)	UCLA (25–7)	11.
12.	Memphis	Oregon (2−0)	Houston (3−0)	BYU (6−0)	Arkansas (8−0)	Michigan State (9−2)	Auburn (10−1)	Houston (11−2)	Houston (12−2)	LSU (14−1)	Kentucky (14–3)	Kentucky (15–4)	Villanova (16–5)	UCLA (16–4)	Illinois (18–6)	UCLA (19–5)	Texas Tech (22–7)	Wisconsin (24–6)	Texas Tech (25–9)	12.
13.	Oregon	Kentucky (1−1)	Arkansas (3–0)	Tennessee (4−1)	Tennessee (6−1)	Auburn (8−1)	Houston (10−2)	Ohio State (8−2)	Ohio State (9−2)	Wisconsin (13−2)	LSU (15–2)	Texas Tech (15–4)	Michigan State (16–4)	Illinois (17–5)	UCLA (17–5)	Wisconsin (21–5)	Tennessee (21–7)	UCLA (23–6)	Providence (25–5)	13.
14.	Alabama	Alabama (2−0)	Illinois (2−1)	Florida (6−0)	Houston (7−1)	Houston (8−2)	Ohio State (8−2)	Tennessee (9−2)	Texas (11−2)	Villanova (11−4)	Michigan State (14–3)	Villanova (14–5)	Texas Tech (16–5)	Wisconsin (18–4)	Houston (20–4)	Houston (22–4)	Arkansas (23–6) т	Texas Tech (23–8)	Wisconsin (24–7)	14.
15.	Houston	Houston (2−0)	Tennessee (3−1)	Houston (5−1)	UConn (8−1)	Ohio State (8−2)	Seton Hall (9−2)	Seton Hall (9−1)	Alabama (10−3)	Iowa State (13−2)	Iowa State (14–3)	USC (16–2)	Providence (18–2)	Villanova (17–6)	Wisconsin (19–5)	Illinois (19–7)	Houston (24–4) т	Arkansas (24–7)	Houston (29–5)	15.
16.	Arkansas	Arkansas (2−0)	St. Bonaventure (5−0)	Alabama (6−1)	USC (8−0)	Seton Hall (9−1)	Texas (8−2)	LSU (12−0)	Providence (13−1)	Ohio State (10−3)	USC (14–2)	Ohio State (12–4)	Ohio State (13–5)	Ohio State (14–5)	Tennessee (18–6)	USC (23–4)	USC (25–4)	Illinois (22–8)	Iowa (26–9)	16.
17.	Ohio State	Tennessee (2−0)	Arizona (5−0)	UConn (6−1)	Iowa State (8−0)	Texas (6−2)	LSU (11−0)	Texas (9−2)	Kentucky (11−2)	Xavier (12−2)	Illinois (13–3)	Providence (16–2)	UConn (15–4)	Michigan State (17–5)	USC (21–4)	Tennessee (19–7)	UCLA (21–6)	Saint Mary's (24–6)	Arkansas (25–8)	17.
18.	Tennessee	North Carolina (2−0)	BYU (4−0)	Memphis (5−1)	Auburn (7−1)	Tennessee (7−2)	Xavier (11−1)	Kentucky (9−2)	Tennessee (9−3)	Kentucky (12−3)	Texas Tech (13–4)	Tennessee (13–5)	Illinois (15–5)	Marquette (16–7)	Ohio State (15–6)	Arkansas (21–6)	UConn (21–7)	Houston (26–5)	Saint Mary's (25–7)	18.
19.	North Carolina	Ohio State (2−0)	Auburn (3−0)	Iowa State (6−0)	Michigan State (7−2)	LSU (9−0)	Tennessee (8−2)	Alabama (9−3)	Villanova (9−4)	Texas Tech (11−3)	Ohio State (11–4)	LSU (15–4)	USC (18–3)	Tennessee (16–6)	Michigan State (18–6)	Murray State (26–2)	Saint Mary's (24–6)	Murray State (30–2)	Illinois (22–9)	19.
20.	Florida State	Maryland (3−0)	Michigan (3−2)	USC (6−0)	Florida (7−1)	UConn (9−2)	Kentucky (8−2)	Colorado State (10−0)	Colorado State (10−0)	Seton Hall (11−3)	Xavier (13–3)	UConn (13–4)	Iowa State (16–5)	Texas (17–6)	Texas (18–7)	Texas (19–8)	Illinois (20–8)	UConn (22–8)	Murray State (30–2)	20.
21.	Maryland	Auburn (2−0)	Seton Hall (3−0)	Auburn (5−1)	Ohio State (6−2)	Kentucky (7−2)	Colorado State (10−0)	Providence (11−1)	LSU (12−1)	Texas (12−3)	Providence (14–2)	Xavier (14–4)	Xavier (15–5)	USC (19–4)	Murray State (24–2)	UConn (19–7)	Texas (21–8)	USC (25–6)	UConn (23–9)	21.
22.	Auburn	St. Bonaventure (2−0)	UConn (4−0)	Michigan State (5−2)	Wisconsin (7−1)	Xavier (9−1)	Providence (11−1)	Villanova (8−4)	Xavier (11−2)	Tennessee (10−4)	Loyola Chicago (13–2)	Marquette (14–6)	Tennessee (14–6)	Saint Mary's (19–4)	Wyoming (21–3)	Ohio State (16–7)	Murray State (28–2)	Texas (21–10)	USC (26–7)	22.
23.	St. Bonaventure	UConn (2−0)	Florida (3−0)	Wisconsin (5−1)	Seton Hall (7−1)	Colorado State (10−0)	Villanova (7−4)	Xavier (11−2)	Wisconsin (10−2)	Providence (14−2)	Texas (13–4)	Iowa State (14–5)	Texas (16–5)	Murray State (22–2)	Arkansas (19–6)	Saint Mary’s (22–6)	Ohio State (18–8)	Colorado State (24–4)	Boise State (27–7)	23.
24.	UConn	Florida (2−0)	USC (3−0)	Michigan (4−2)	BYU (7−1)	Arkansas (9−1)	Wisconsin (9−2)	Wisconsin (9−2)	Seton Hall (9−3)	Alabama (11−4)	Tennessee (11–5)	Illinois (13–5)	Marquette (15–7)	UConn (15–6)	UConn (17–7)	Alabama (17–10)	Iowa (20–8)	Iowa (22–9)	Colorado State (25–5)	24.
25.	Virginia	USC (2−0)	Xavier (4−0)	Seton Hall (5−1)	LSU (8−0)	Texas Tech (7−1)	Texas Tech (8−2)	Texas Tech (9−2)	Texas Tech (10−2)	Illinois (11−3)	UConn (11–4)	Davidson (16–2)	LSU (16–5)	Xavier (16–6)	Alabama (16–9)	Iowa (18–8)	Alabama (19–10)	North Carolina (23–8)	Texas (21–11)	25.
	Preseason Oct 18	Week 2 Nov 15	Week 3 Nov 22	Week 4 Nov 29	Week 5 Dec 6	Week 6 Dec 13	Week 7 Dec 20	Week 8 Dec 27	Week 9 Jan 3	Week 10 Jan 10	Week 11 Jan 17	Week 12 Jan 24	Week 13 Jan 31	Week 14 Feb 7	Week 15 Feb 14	Week 16 Feb 21	Week 17 Feb 28	Week 18 Mar 7	Final Mar 14	
		Dropped: Florida State (1−1); Virginia (1−1)	Dropped: Oregon (2−1); North Carolina (3−2); Ohio State (3−1); Maryland (4−1)	Dropped: Illinois (4−2); St. Bonaventure (5−1); Xavier (5−1)	Dropped: Memphis (5−3); Michigan (5−3)	Dropped: Florida (7−3); BYU (8−2); Wisconsin (8−2)	Dropped: UConn (9−3); Arkansas (9−2)	None	None	Dropped: Colorado State (11−1)	Dropped: Alabama (11–6); Seton Hall (11–5)	Dropped: Loyola Chicago (14–3); Texas (14–5)	Dropped: Davidson (17–3)	Dropped: Iowa State (16−7); LSU (16−7)	Dropped: Marquette (16–9); Saint Mary's (20–6); Xavier (17–7)	Dropped: Michigan State (18–8); Wyoming (22–4)	None	Dropped: Ohio State (19–11); Alabama (19–12)	Dropped: North Carolina (24–9)	

== USA Today Coaches Poll ==
	Preseason Oct 27	Week 2 Nov 22	Week 3 Nov 29	Week 4 Dec 6	Week 5 Dec 13	Week 6 Dec 20	Week 7 Dec 27	Week 8 Jan 3	Week 9 Jan 10	Week 10 Jan 17	Week 11 Jan 24	Week 12 Jan 31	Week 13 Feb 7	Week 14 Feb 14	Week 15 Feb 21	Week 16 Feb 28	Week 17 Mar 7	Week 18 Mar 14	Final Apr 5	
1.	Gonzaga (29)	Gonzaga (4–0) (30)	Duke (7–0) (19)	Purdue (8–0) (29)	Baylor (9–0) (30)	Baylor (10–0) (32)	Baylor (11–0) (32)	Baylor (13–0) (32)	Baylor (15–0) (32)	Gonzaga (14–2) (23)	Gonzaga (15–2) (18)	Gonzaga (17–2) (16)т	Gonzaga (19–2) (18)	Gonzaga (21–2) (30)	Gonzaga (23–2) (32)	Gonzaga (24–3) (20)	Gonzaga (24–3) (27)	Gonzaga (26–3) (31)	Kansas (34–6) (32)	1.
2.	UCLA (2)	UCLA (4–0) (2)	Purdue (6–0) (10)	Baylor (8–0) (3)	Duke (7–1) (1)	Duke (10–1)	Duke (11–1)	Duke (11–1)	Gonzaga (12–2)	Auburn (15–1) (8)	Auburn (18–1) (13)	Auburn (20–1) (16)т	Auburn (22–1) (14)	Auburn (23–2) (2)	Arizona (24–2)	Duke (25–4) (9)	Arizona (28–3) (2)	Arizona (31–3) (1)	North Carolina (29–10)	2.
3.	Kansas	Kansas (3–0)	Gonzaga (6–1)	Duke (7–1)	UCLA (8–1)	Purdue (10–1)	Purdue (11–1)	Purdue (12–1)	UCLA (10–1)	Arizona (14–1) (1)	Arizona (16–1) (1)	Purdue (18–3)	Purdue (20–3)	Kentucky (21–4)	Kentucky (22–5)	Arizona (25–3)	Baylor (26–5) (2)	Kansas (28–6)	Duke (32–7)	3.
4.	Villanova	Purdue (5–0)	Baylor (7–0) (2)	UCLA (7–1)	Purdue (9–1) т	Arizona (11–0)т	Gonzaga (10–2)	Gonzaga (11–2)	Auburn (14–1)	Purdue (14–2)	Baylor (17–2)	UCLA (16–2)	Kentucky (19–4)	Arizona (22–2)	Auburn (24–3)	Baylor (24–5) (1)	Auburn (27–4) (1)	Baylor (26–6)	Villanova (30–8)	4.
5.	Texas	Baylor (4–0)	UCLA (6–1)	Gonzaga (7–2)	Gonzaga (8–2) т	Gonzaga (9–2)т	UCLA (8–1)	UCLA (8–1)	Purdue (13–2)	Duke (14–2)	Kansas (16–2)	Arizona (17–2)	Arizona (19–2)	Duke (21–4)	Kansas (22–4)	Auburn (25–4) (1)	Kentucky (25–6)	Villanova (26–7)	Gonzaga (28–4)	5.
6.	Michigan	Duke (5–0)	Villanova (4–2)	Villanova (6–2)	Arizona (9–0)	UCLA (8–1)	Kansas (9–1)	Kansas (11–1)	Arizona (12–1)	Baylor (15–2)	Purdue (16–3)	Duke (17–3)	Duke (19–3)	Kansas (20–4)	Duke (23–4)	Kentucky (23–6) (1)	Kansas (25–6)	Kentucky (26–7)	Arizona (33–4)	6.
7.	Purdue	Villanova (3–2)	Kansas (5–1)	Kansas (6–1)	Kansas (8–1)	Kansas (9–1)	Arizona (11–1)	Arizona (11–1)	USC (13–0)	Kansas (14–2)	Duke (15–3)	Kentucky (17–4)	Houston (20–2)	Purdue (22–4)	Purdue (24–4)	Kansas (23–5)	Duke (26–5)	Auburn (27–5)	Houston (32–6)	7.
8.	Baylor	Texas (3–1)	Texas (4–1)	Arizona (7–0)	Alabama (8–1) (1)	Iowa State (11–0)	Iowa State (12–0)	USC (12–0)	Duke (12–2)	Wisconsin (14–2)	UCLA (13–2)	Baylor (18–3)	Kansas (19–3)	Baylor (21–4)	Villanova (21–6)	Providence (24–3)	Villanova (23–7)	Tennessee (26–7)	Arkansas (28–9)	8.
9.	Duke	Alabama (4–0)	Arkansas (6–0)	Alabama (7–1)	USC (10–0)	USC (12–0)	USC (12–0)	Auburn (12–1)	Michigan State (13–2)	UCLA (11–2)	Houston (17–2)	Houston (18–2)	Texas Tech (18–5)	Providence (21–2)	Texas Tech (21–6)	Purdue (24–5)	Purdue (25–6)	Purdue (27–7)	Baylor (27–7)	9.
10.	Illinois	Memphis (4–0)	Kentucky (5–1)	Arkansas (8–0)	Villanova (7–3)	Michigan State (9–2)	Michigan State (10–2)	Michigan State (12–2)	Kansas (12–2)	Houston (15–2)	Michigan State (15–3)	Kansas (17–3)	Baylor (19–4)	Villanova (19–6)	Providence (22–3)	Wisconsin (23–5)	Providence (24–4)	Duke (28–6)	Purdue (29–8)	10.
11.	Kentucky	Houston (3–0)	Arizona (6–0)	Texas (6–1)	Iowa State (10–0)	Alabama (9–2)	Auburn (11–1)	Iowa State (12–1)	Houston (14–2)	Villanova (13–4)	Wisconsin (15–3)	Wisconsin (17–3)	Providence (20–2)	Texas Tech (19–6)	Baylor (22–6)	Villanova (21–7)	Tennessee (23–7)	Texas Tech (25–9)	UCLA (27–8)	11.
12.	Oregon	Arkansas (3–0)	Florida (6–0)	Kentucky (6–1)	Michigan State (9–2)	Auburn (10–1)	Ohio State (8–2)	Ohio State (9–2)	LSU (14–1)	Kentucky (14–3)	Villanova (14–5)	Villanova (16–5)	UCLA (16–4)	Illinois (18–6)	Wisconsin (21–5)	Texas Tech (22–7)	Wisconsin (24–6)	UCLA (25–7)	Texas Tech (27–10)	12.
13.	Alabama	Michigan (3–2) т	BYU (6–0)	Houston (7–1)	Houston (8–2)	Ohio State (8–2)	Seton Hall (9–2)	Kentucky (11–2)	Wisconsin (13–2)	Michigan State (14–3)	Kentucky (15–4)	Michigan State (16–4)	Illinois (17–5)	Tennessee (18–6)	UCLA (19–5)	Tennessee (21–7)	UCLA (23–6)	Providence (25–5)	Providence (27–6)	13.
14.	Houston	Kentucky (3–1) т	Houston (5–1)	Tennessee (6–1)	Auburn (8–1)	Houston (10–2)	Houston (11–2)	Houston (12–2)	Villanova (11–4)	Iowa State (14–3)	Texas Tech (15–4)	Texas Tech (16–5)	Wisconsin (18–4)	UCLA (17–5)	Illinois (19–7)	Houston (24–4)	Texas Tech (23–8)	Wisconsin (24–7)	Auburn (28–6)	14.
15.	Arkansas	Illinois (2–1)	Tennessee (4–1)	USC (8–0)	Ohio State (8–2)	Seton Hall (9–1)	Tennessee (9–2)	Villanova (9–4)	Ohio State (10–3)	USC (14–2)	USC (16–2)	Providence (18–2)	Villanova (17–6)	Houston (20–4)	Houston (22–4)	Arkansas (23–6)	Illinois (22–8)	Houston (29–5)	Tennessee (27–8)	15.
16.	Memphis	St. Bonaventure (5–0)	Alabama (6–1)	Florida (6–1)	Seton Hall (9–1)	LSU (11–0)	LSU (12–0)	Texas (11–2)	Iowa State (13–2)	LSU (15–2)	Ohio State (12–4)	Ohio State (13–5)	Ohio State (14–5)	Wisconsin (19–5)	USC (23–4)	USC (25–4)	Arkansas (24–7)	Saint Mary's (25–7)	Miami (FL) (26–11) т	16.
17.	Tennessee	Tennessee (3–1)	UConn (6–1)	Wisconsin (7–1)	Texas (6–2)	Texas (8–2)	Kentucky (9–2)	Providence (13–1)	Kentucky (12–3)	Illinois (13–3)	Providence (16–2)	UConn (15–4)	Michigan State (17–5)	USC (21–4)	Tennessee (19–7)	Illinois (20–8)	Saint Mary's (24–6)	Illinois (22–9)	Kentucky (26–8) т	17.
18.	Ohio State	BYU (4–0)	USC (6–0)	UConn (8–1)	Tennessee (7–2)	Kentucky (8–2)	Texas (9–2)	Tennessee (9–3)	Seton Hall (11–3)	Ohio State (11–4)	LSU (15–4)	Illinois (15–5)	Tennessee (16–6)	Ohio State (15–6)	Arkansas (21–6)	UCLA (21–6)	Houston (26–5)	Arkansas (25–8)	Wisconsin (25–8)	18.
19.	Florida State	Arizona (5–0)	Memphis (5–1)	Iowa State (8–0)	Arkansas (9–1)	Tennessee (8–2)	Alabama (9–3)	Colorado State (10–0)	Texas Tech (11–3)	Texas Tech (13–4)	UConn (13–4)	USC (18–3)	Marquette (16–7)	Michigan State (18–6)	Ohio State (16–7)	UConn (21–7)	Murray State (30–2)	Iowa (26–9)	Illinois (23–10)	19.
20.	North Carolina	Seton Hall (3–0)	Auburn (5–1)	Michigan State (7–2)	LSU (9–0)	Xavier (11–1)	Colorado State (10–0)	Alabama (10–3)	Providence (14–2)	Xavier (13–3)	Tennessee (13–5)	Tennessee (14–6)	Texas (17–6)	Texas (18–7)	UConn (19–7)	Saint Mary's (24–6)	UConn (22–8)	Murray State (30–2)	Saint Mary's (26–8)	20.
21.	Maryland	UConn (4–0)	Wisconsin (5–1)	Auburn (7–1)	Kentucky (7–2)	Colorado State (10–0)	Providence (12–1)	LSU (12–1)	Xavier (12–2)	Providence (14–2)	Illinois (13–5)	Texas (16–5)	USC (19–4)	Murray State (24–2)	Murray State (26–2)	Texas (21–8)	USC (25–6)	UConn (23–9)	Iowa (26–10)	21.
22.	Auburn	Auburn (3–0)	Michigan State (5–2)	Ohio State (6–2)	UConn (9–2)	Villanova (7–4)	Villanova (8–4)	Seton Hall (9–3)	Texas (12–3)	Texas (13–4)	Colorado State (15–1)	Iowa State (16–5)	Saint Mary's (19–4)	Wyoming (21–3)	Texas (19–8)	Murray State (28–2)	Texas (21–10)	USC (26–7)	Murray State (31–3)	22.
23.	UConn	Oregon (2–1)	Iowa State (6–0)	BYU (7–1)	Colorado State (10−0)	Providence (11−1)	Wisconsin (9–2)	Wisconsin (10–2)	Tennessee (10–4)	Colorado State (13–1)	Xavier (14–4)	Xavier (15–5)	UConn (15–6)	Marquette (16–9)	Saint Mary’s (22–6)	Ohio State (18–8)	Iowa (22–9)	Boise State (27–7)	Iowa State (22–13)	23.
24.	St. Bonaventure	Florida (3–0)	Michigan (4–2)	LSU (8–0)	Texas Tech (7−1)	Wisconsin (9−2)	Xavier (11–2)	Xavier (11–2)	Illinois (11–3)	Loyola Chicago (13–2)	Iowa State (14–5)	Marquette (15–7)	Murray State (22–2)	UConn (17–7)	Michigan State (18–8)	Alabama (19–10)	Colorado State (24–4)	Virginia Tech (23–12)	Saint Peters (22–12)	24.
25.	Virginia	USC (3–0)	St. Bonaventure (5–1)	Seton Hall (7–1)	Xavier (9−1)	Texas Tech (8−2)	Texas Tech (9–2)	Texas Tech (10–2)	Alabama (11–4)	Tennessee (11–5)	Texas (14–5)	LSU (16–5)	Wake Forest (19–5)	Arkansas (19–6)	Alabama (17–10)	Iowa (20–8)т Michigan State (19–9)т	Ohio State (19–10)	Texas (21–11)	Michigan (19–15)	25.
	Preseason Oct 27	Week 2 Nov 22	Week 3 Nov 29	Week 4 Dec 6	Week 5 Dec 13	Week 6 Dec 20	Week 7 Dec 27	Week 8 Jan 3	Week 9 Jan 10	Week 10 Jan 17	Week 11 Jan 24	Week 12 Jan 31	Week 13 Feb 7	Week 14 Feb 14	Week 15 Feb 21	Week 16 Feb 28	Week 17 Mar 7	Week 18 Mar 14	Final Apr 5	
		Dropped: Ohio State (3−1); Florida State (3−2); North Carolina (3−2); Maryland (4−1); Virginia (2−2)	Dropped: Illinois (4–2); Seton Hall (5–1); Oregon (3–3)	Dropped: Memphis (5–3); Michigan (5–3); St. Bonaventure (7–1)	Dropped: Florida (7−3); Wisconsin (8−2); BYU (8−2)	Dropped: Arkansas (9−2); UConn (9−3)	Dropped: None	Dropped: None	Dropped: Colorado State (11–1)	Dropped: Alabama (11–6); Seton Hall (11–5)	Dropped: Loyola Chicago (14–3)	Dropped: Colorado State (16–2)	Dropped: Iowa State (16–7); Xavier (16–6); LSU (16–7)	Dropped: Saint Mary's (20–6); Wake Forest (20–6)	Dropped: Wyoming (22–4); Marquette (17–10)	None	Dropped: Alabama (19–12); Michigan State (20–11)	Dropped: Colorado State (25–5); Ohio State (19–11)	Dropped: UConn (23–10); USC (26–8); Boise State (27–8); Virginia Tech (23–13); Texas (22–12)	

== See also ==
2021–22 NCAA Division I women's basketball rankings
