= War Memorial Fieldhouse =

Multi-purpose arena in Wyoming, US

- Interactive map of War Memorial Fieldhouse
- Coordinates: 41°18′42.34″N 105°34′12.42″W
- Owner: University of Wyoming
- Operator: University of Wyoming
- Capacity: 5,000

Construction
- Opened: 1951

Tenants
- Wyoming Cowboys (Indoor Track and Field & Wrestling)

War Memorial Fieldhouse is a 5,000-seat multi-purpose arena in Laramie, Wyoming. It opened in 1951 along with War Memorial Stadium. It currently hosts the school's wrestling and indoor track and field programs.

It was home to the University of Wyoming Cowboys basketball team from 1951 until 1982 when it was replaced by the Arena-Auditorium.

Its highest attendance was 10,580 spectators in 1953 in a game against Brigham Young University.
